= Barnbruch =

Wetland in Lower Saxony, Germany

Coordinates: 52°27′23″N 10°39′09″E

Location of the wetland area

The Barnbruch is a wetland of international importance in the old glacial valley of the river Aller that provides a habitat for endangered species of birds, amphibians and insects. It lies between the city of Wolfsburg and town of Gifhorn and consists of an enclosed woodland area of around 1,500 hectares (3,700 acres) with surrounding meadows and pastures. This low-lying depression lies partly within the territory of the city of Wolfsburg and partly within Gifhorn district. Together with the Drömling around 15 km to the east, the Barnbruch is the most valuable ecological lowland region along the upper course of the Aller.

== Location ==
The Barnbruch is about 4 x 7 kilometres across and is bordered:

- To the west by the Elbe Lateral Canal and the artificial lake of the Tankumsee (Isenbüttel)
- To the north by the Aller and the villages of Osloß and Weyhausen
- To the east by the industrial facilities of the Wolfsburg Volkswagen factory
- To the south by the K 114 district road (Wolfsburg-Gifhorn northern link) and the village of Calberlah

== Drainage ==
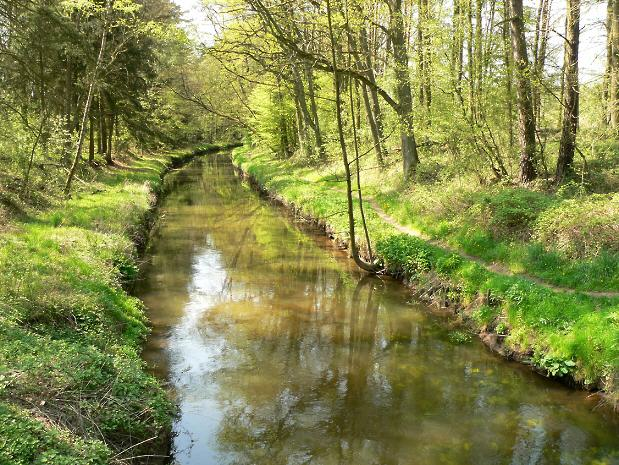
The Aller Canal has drained the Barnbruch since 1863.

Originally the Barnbruch was a carr (Bruchwald) or fen woodland. In 1830 it was the cause of complaint by the inhabitants of the neighbouring villages to their king. They said that, for years, they had not been able to harvest any hay and that their farms had been ruined by floods. Following a state treaty in 1860 between Prussia, the Kingdom of Hanover and Duchy of Brunswick over the regulation of the Aller and the Ohre, work began on draining the area. The main contribution to this effort was the Aller Canal, built 1860-63, between Wolfsburg and Gifhorn. Draining the land of water turned the swamps into a wetland with a rich variety of trees, in which both fen and riverside woods with birch, oak, ash and alder trees could flourish. Today large parts of the Barnbruch are nature reserves, in which several areas have been left to evolve without any human intervention.

== Wood ==
Up to 1770 the swampy Bruchwald was not forested and pine trees only grew on a few higher points (sand dunes dating back to the Ice Age). The high levels of ground water and periodic flooding created alder groves which were largely inaccessible to people. In 1833 softwood trees, especially the alder accounted for 82% of the total area, whilst pines covered only 1%. In 1875, as a result of the drainage, this had fundamentally changed. Now alders only covered 42% of the land, whilst pine and birch now made up 51%.

== Sources ==
- Der Barnbruch in: Naturschutzgebiete im Raum Gifhorn-Wolfsburg, Jürgen Schröder, 1986 Gifhorn
