= Aller (Germany) =

River in Germany

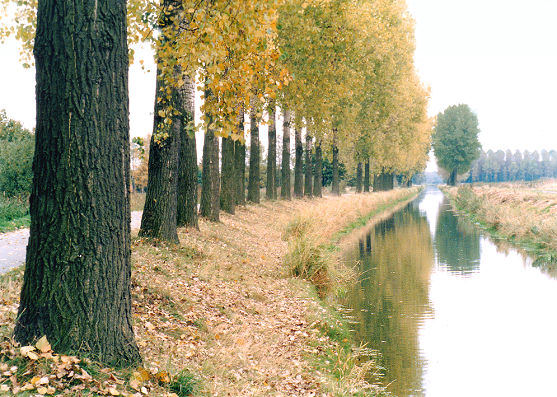
- The canalised and poplar-lined Aller in the Drömling near Wolfsburg-Vorsfelde

Location
- Country: Germany
- States: Saxony-Anhalt and Lower Saxony
- Reference no.: DE: 48

Physical characteristics
- Source
  - location: in Eggenstedt near Seehausen in the Magdeburg Börde
  - coordinates: 52°06′09″N 11°14′01″E
  - elevation: 130 m above sea level (NN)
- Mouth
  - location: Weser near Verden
  - coordinates: 52°56′45″N 9°11′08″E
  - elevation: 10 m above sea level (NN)
- Length: 214.8 km (133.5 mi)
- Basin size: 15,721 km^{2} (6,070 sq mi)
- Discharge
  - average: 118 m^{3}/s (4,200 cu ft/s)

Basin features
- Progression: Weser→ North Sea
- Landmarks: Cities: Wolfsburg; Large towns: Gifhorn, Celle, Verden; Small towns: Oebisfelde-Weferlingen, Rethem; Villages: Wefensleben, Ingersleben, Müden, Wienhausen, Oldau, Winsen, Hodenhagen, Hülsen, Westen
- Tributaries
  - left: Oker, Fuhse, Wietze, Leine, Alpe, Wölpe
  - right: Kleine Aller, Ise, Lachte, Örtze, Meiße, Böhme, Lehrde, Gohbach
- Navigable: 117 km (73 mi); from Celle Class II, from Verden Class III

The Aller (pronounced [ˈalɐ]) is a 215-kilometre-long (134 mi) river in the states of Saxony-Anhalt and Lower Saxony in Germany. It is a right-hand, and hence eastern, tributary of the Weser and is also its largest tributary. Its last 117 kilometres (73 mi) form the Lower Aller federal waterway (Bundeswasserstraße). The Aller was extensively straightened, widened and, in places, dyked during the 1960s to provide flood control of the river. In a 20-kilometre-long (12 mi) section near Gifhorn, the river meanders in its natural river bed.

== History ==
=== Meaning of the name ===
The river's name, which was recorded in 781 as Alera, in 803 as Elera, in 1096 as Alara, has two possible derivations:

1. A shortened form of *Eleraha, where *Eler in Old German *olisa or Old Slavic olsa (Polish: olsza) would mean Erle ("alder") and aha (pronounced in German: Acha) is an old word frequently used in river names to mean "water" (cf. the Latin aqua). The name of the tree passed into Low German as Eller, which is very close to the word Aller. Aller would therefore mean something like Erlenwasser i.e. "alder water", which was probably due to the river banks being largely covered in alder trees that prefer wet locations.
2. In Hans Krahe's system of Old European hydronomy, the old name for the Aller, Alara, is an example of a group of river names with the root al-, which is very common over much of Europe and according to Krahe all go back to the Indo-European root *el-/*ol-, which means "flowing". Similarly related would be rivers such as the Alster, Iller, Elz and Ilmenau. Krahe's hypothesis is, however, hotly disputed in language circles. Theo Vennemann used a modified version of Krahe's model in his Vasconic substratum theory.

== Course ==
=== Upper Aller ===
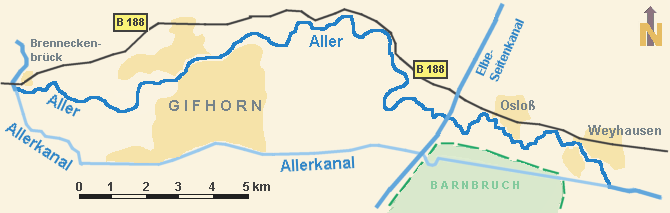
Section of the Upper Aller near Gifhorn with the Aller Canal, the only remaining part of the river with tight meanders

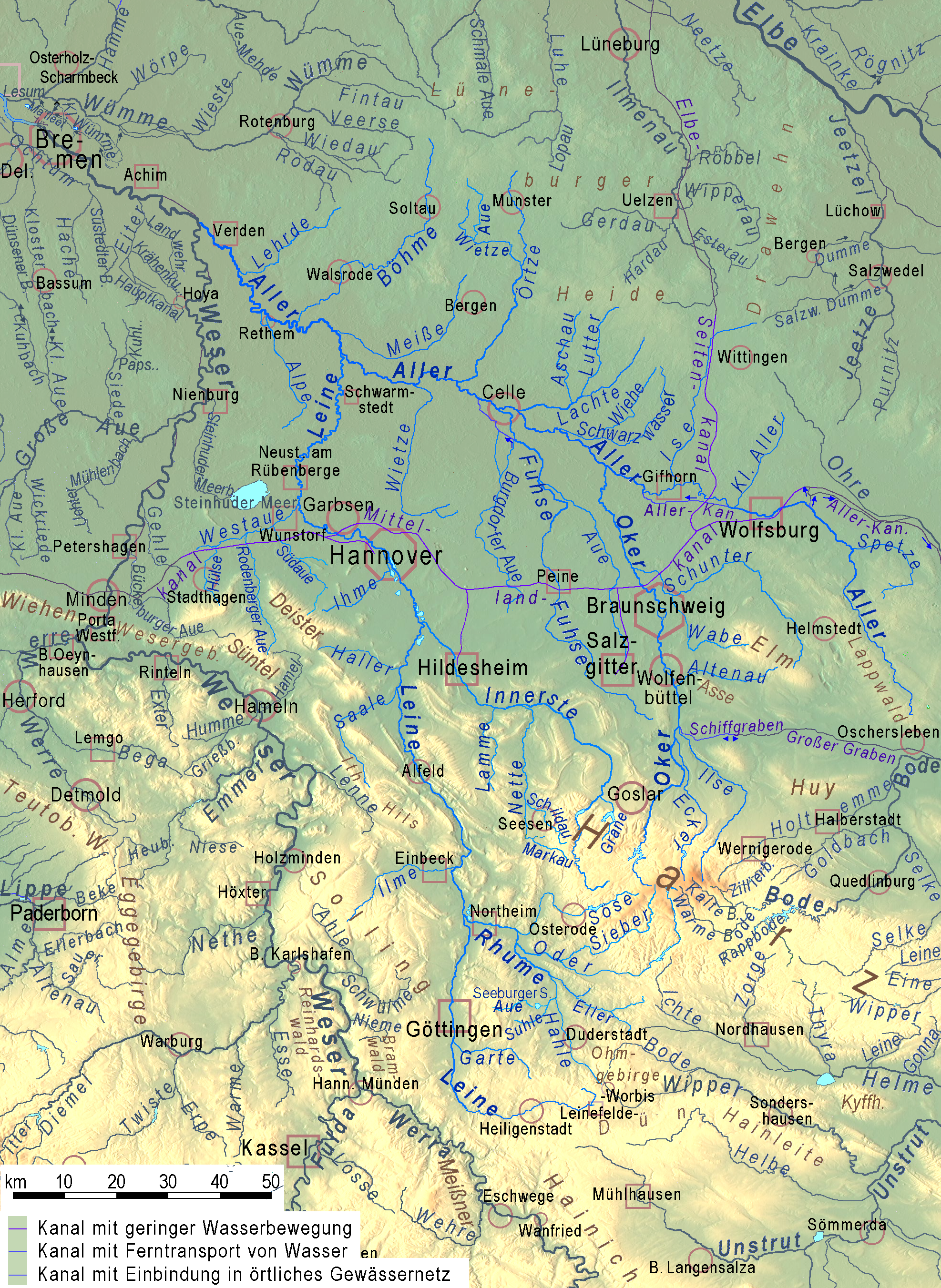
Rivers of Aller basin in blue, others in grey

The Aller rises in the state of Saxony-Anhalt in the west of the region known as the Magdeburg Börde near Seehausen and north of Oschersleben (Bode). It has several source streams that run down the northeastern side of the Hohes Holz within the municipal boundaries of Wormsdorf (part of Gehringsdorf), Ovelgünne (part of Siegersleben) and Eggenstedt. The Eggenstedt tributary is the most southerly of the source streams. The nearest large centres of population in the source region are Helmstedt, about 20 kilometres (12 mi) northwest, and Magdeburg around 25 kilometres (16 mi) east.

Initially, the Aller flows rather like a canalised brook in a northwestern direction through low hills and intensively farmed arable fields. As it does, it passes the Flechtingen Hills to the east and another range of hills to the west that stretches from the Lappwald over the Hohes Holz as far as Oschersleben (Bode). The river passes the villages of Eilsleben and Weferlingen. After about 60 river kilometres (37 mi), it reaches Oebisfelde and the southern edge of the Drömling. After crossing the state border between Saxony-Anhalt and Lower Saxony, the Aller bends sharply southwest near Grafhorst. Here, the terrain is already only about 55 metres (180 ft) above sea level. Between here and its mouth, 150 kilometres (93 mi) away, its elevation drops by only about 40 metres (130 ft), so that the speed of the current is considerably reduced in Lower Saxony. Near Grafhorst, the Aller meets the Breslau-Magdeburg-Bremen glacial valley and then, for the most part, follows it. From here on, the river mainly runs through grassland.

Near Wolfsburg-Wendschott, the Aller passes under the Mittelland Canal in a culvert where there is a barrier that is impassable to fish. The Aller swings northwest again from Wolfsburg. In the area of the town it crosses the Allerpark and flows past the Allersee before flowing past the Barnbruch.

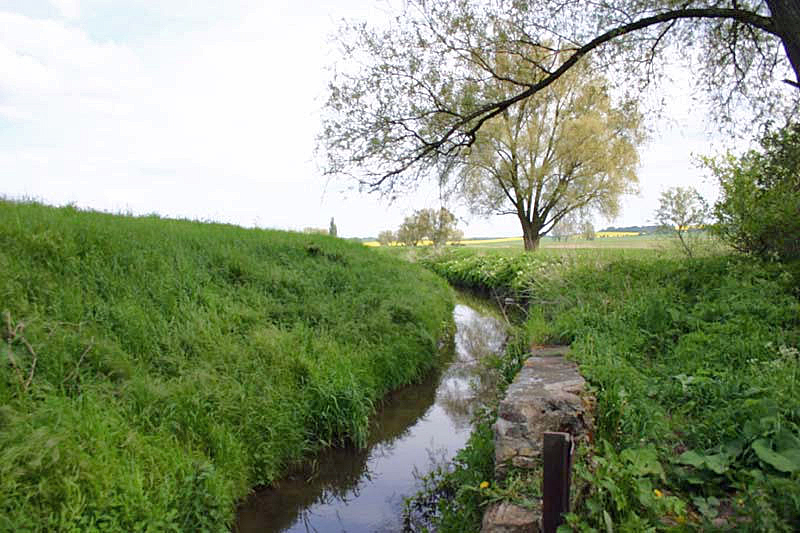
The Aller near Wefensleben, about 10 kilometres (6 mi) below its source

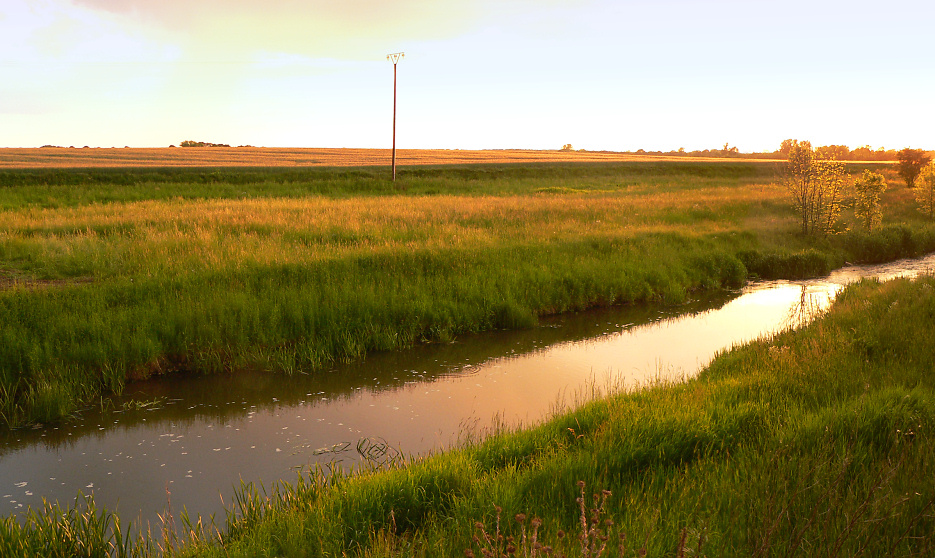
The Aller near Oebisfelde

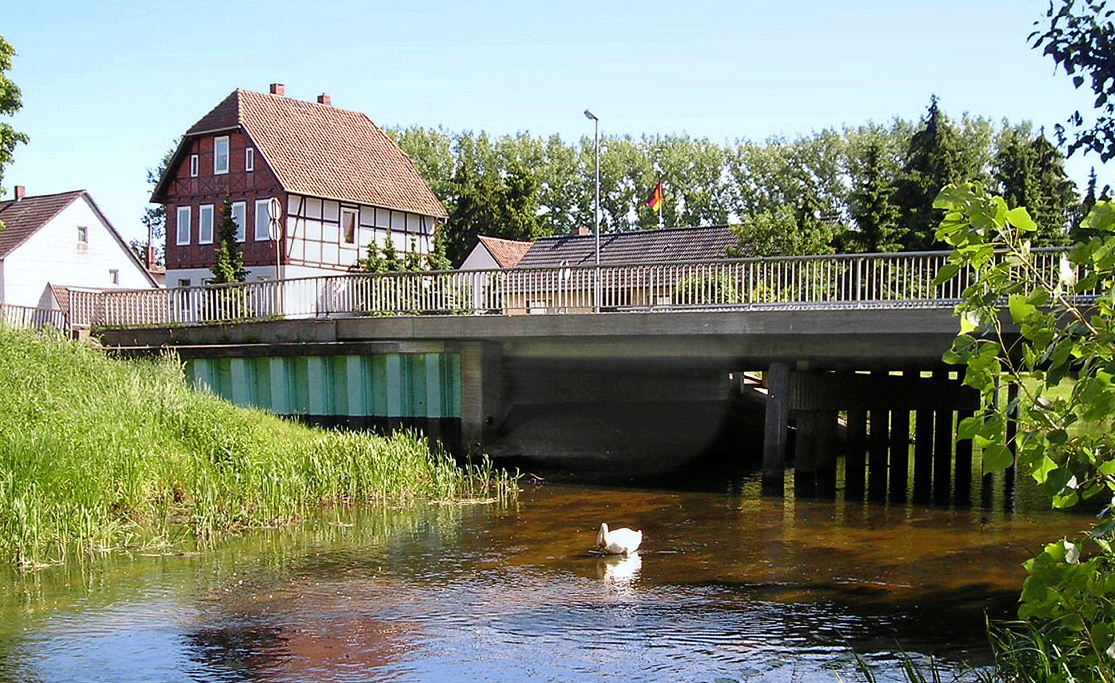
Bridge on the Upper Aller in Wolfsburg-Vorsfelde

South of Weyhausen, the Aller Canal branches off the Aller. The canal was built between 1860 and 1863 and is about 18 kilometres (11 mi) long. It was supposed to drain the long-standing floods that were greatly feared at that time. The canal runs parallel to, and generally a few miles south of, the Aller, rejoining it near Brenneckenbrück (west of Gifhorn). The canal runs south past Gifhorn, whilst the Aller flows through the town. This 20-kilometre-long (12 mi) section, which parallels the Aller Canal, is the only section of the Aller that meanders in its natural river channel. Elsewhere, the Aller has been straightened and widened along its entire length from source to mouth. East of Gifhorn near Osloß it crosses under the Elbe Lateral Canal, which is carried over it on an aqueduct. After that it runs via Gifhorn to Müden, where it merges with the Oker.

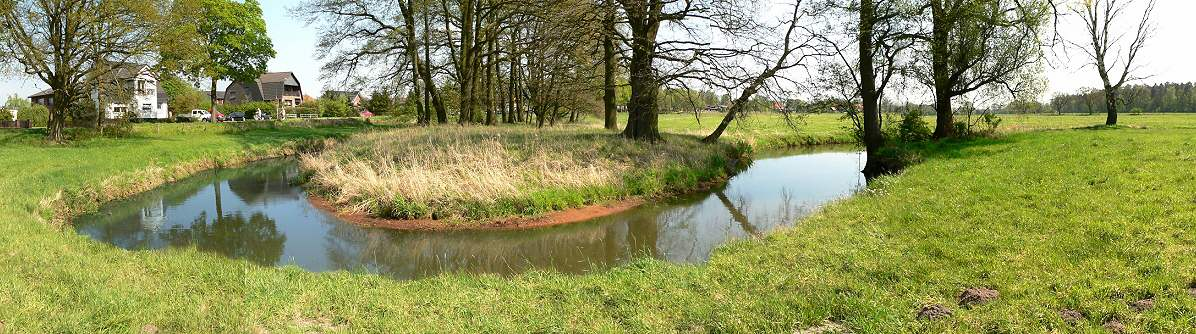
Bend in the river on the Upper Aller in Dannenbüttel

=== Middle Aller ===
The 30-kilometre-long (19 mi) section of the Aller from the mouth of the Oker to Celle is referred to as the Middle Aller (Mittelaller). After passing Wienhausen, it is navigable as far as Celle. Here, the river has so much water that there are barrages and the water power is extracted from the river using weirs.

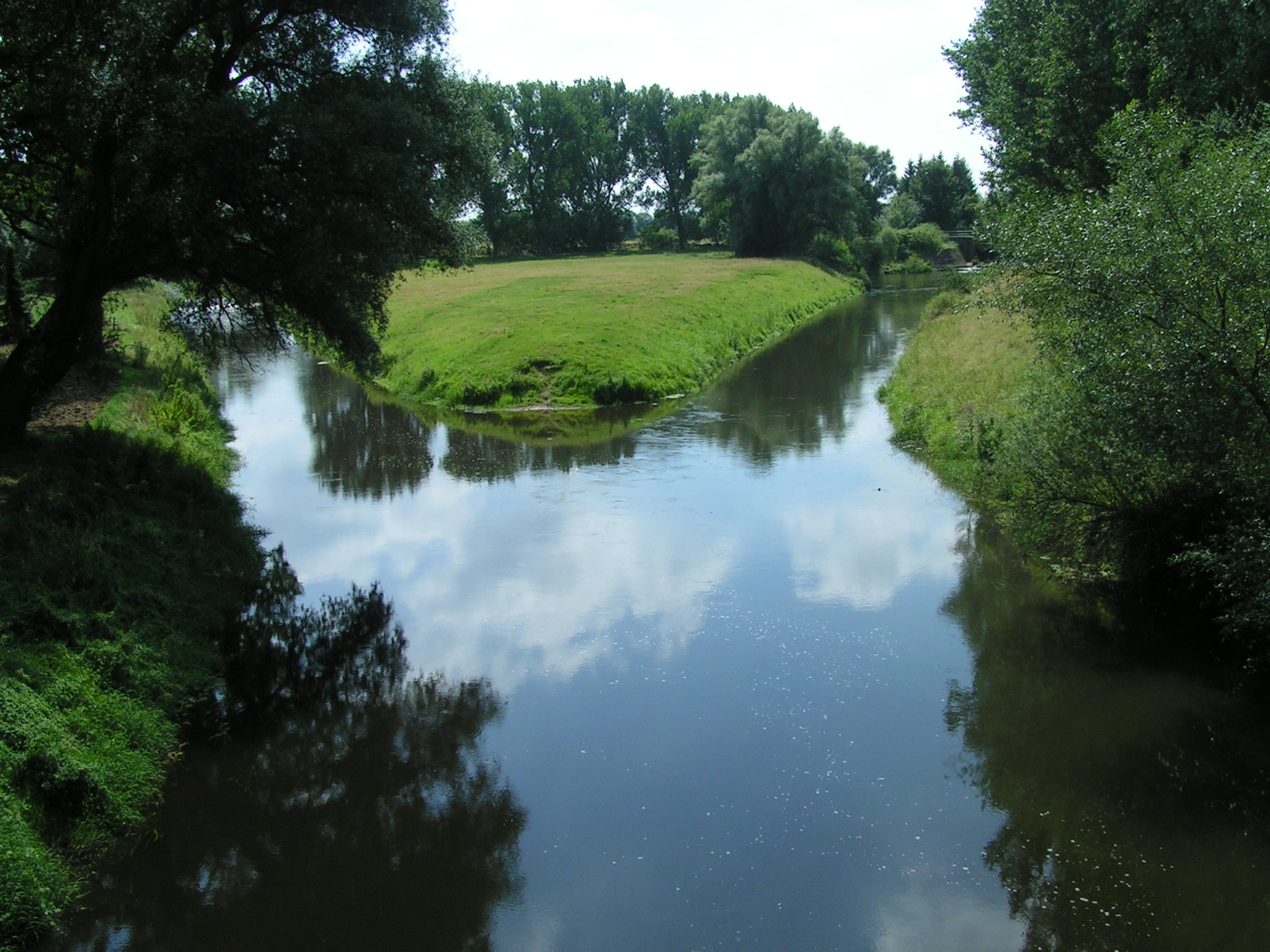
Confluence with the Oker (right) near Müden

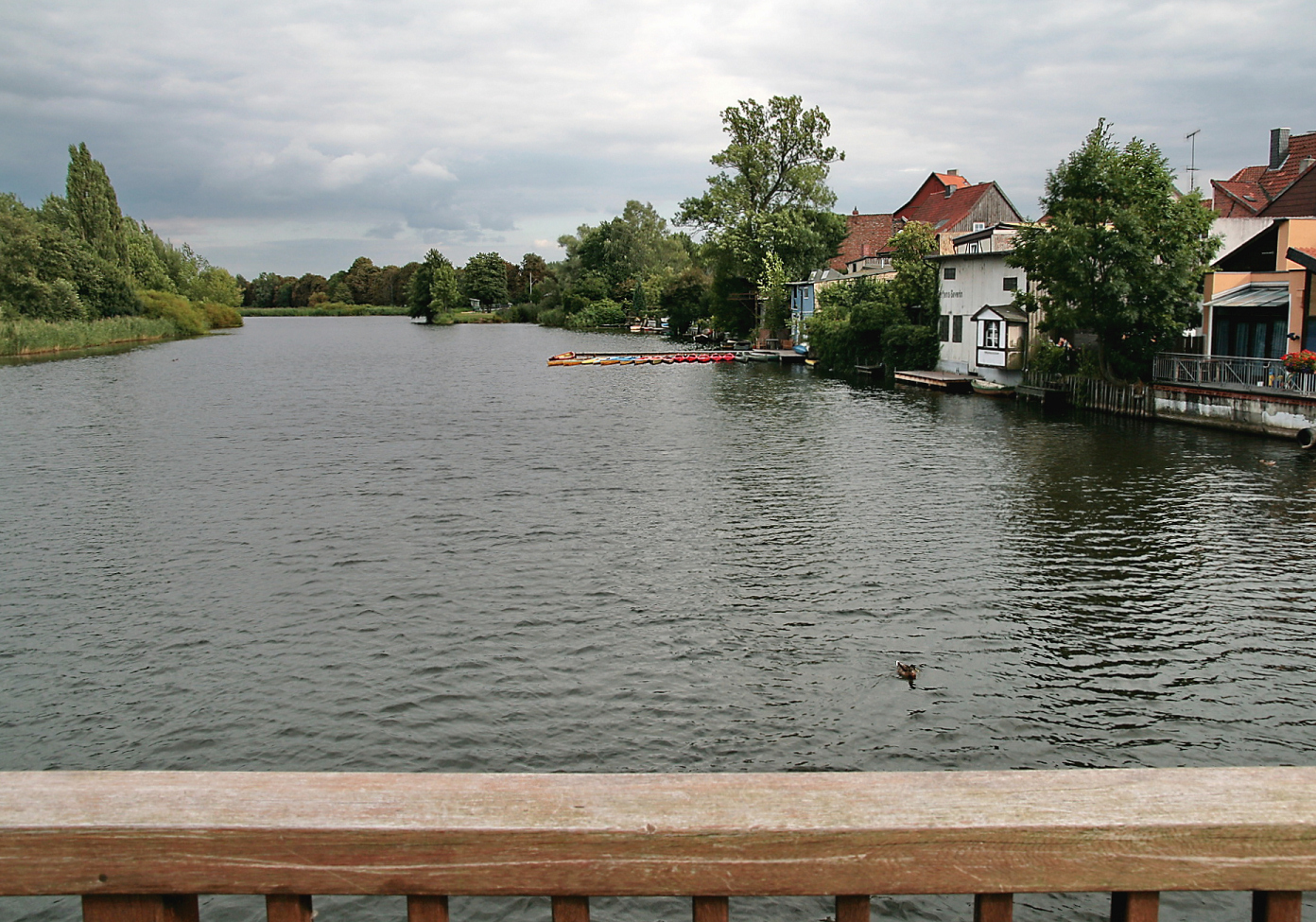
The river in Celle

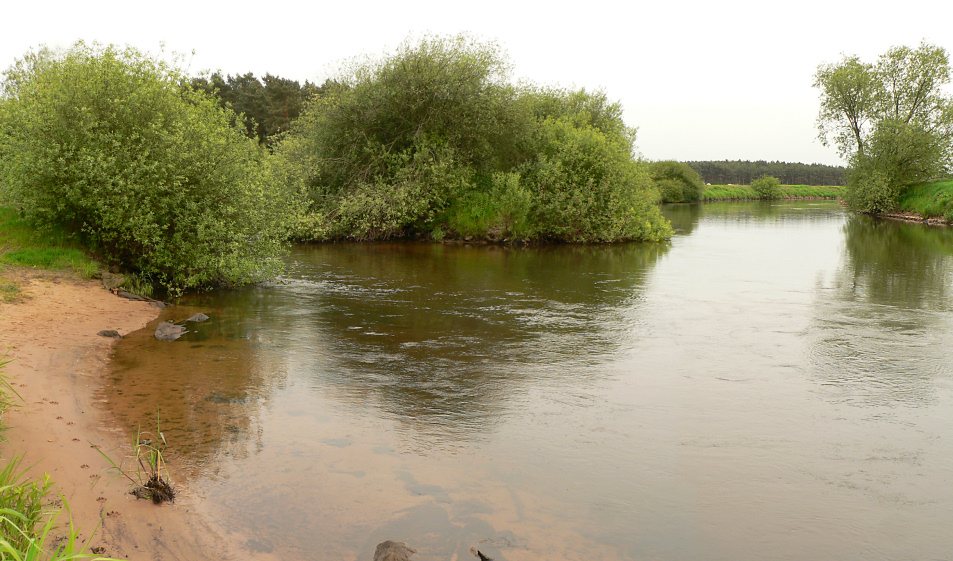
Mouth of the Örtze (left) near Winsen (Aller)

=== Lower Aller ===
The section of the river known as the Lower Aller (Unteraller) begins at Celle and runs for 120 kilometres (75 mi) to the Weser. The Lower Aller is a designated federal waterway (Bundeswasserstraße). The river is navigable from here to Winsen. Near Eickeloh a reaction ferry crosses the Aller and it is here that the Leine flows into the Aller. Upstream and downstream of Rethem, there are two groups of impressive meanders. Below them it passes Verden. About 4 kilometres (2.5 mi) northwest of the town, near Eißel, a village in the borough of Verden, the Aller finally discharges into the Weser. There are two Alte Allers, i. e. old branches of the Aller. One is on the left bank opposite Verden. The other is on the right bank and is the former lowest part of the course of the river.

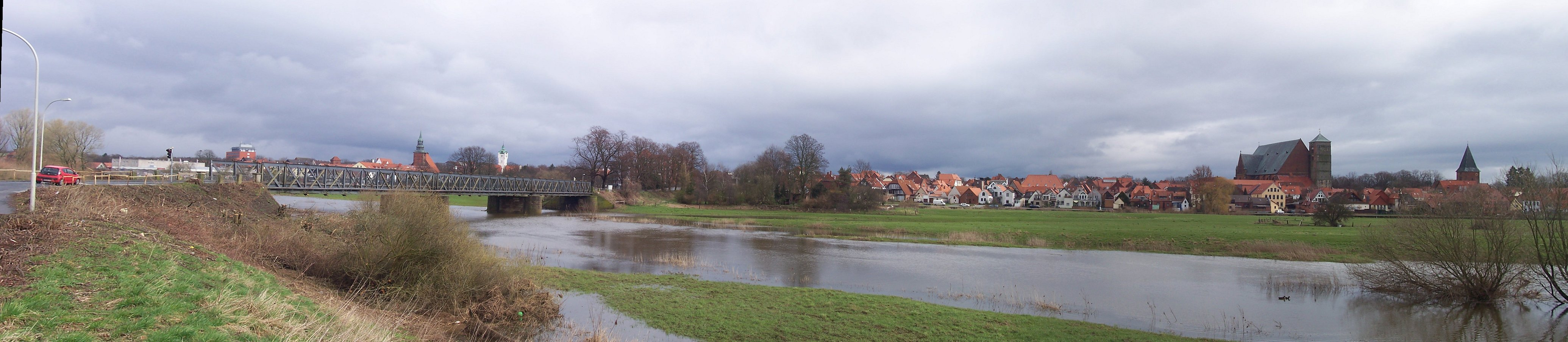
Floods on the Old Aller near Verden

== Aller glacial valley ==
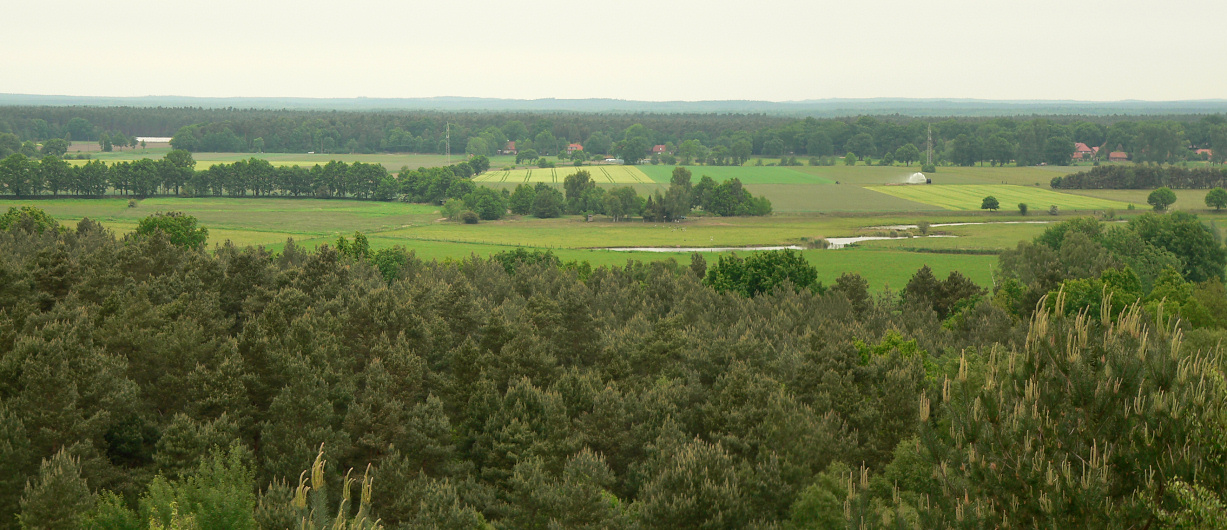
The Aller Valley near Wietze. In the background, the low hills of the Lüneburg Heath

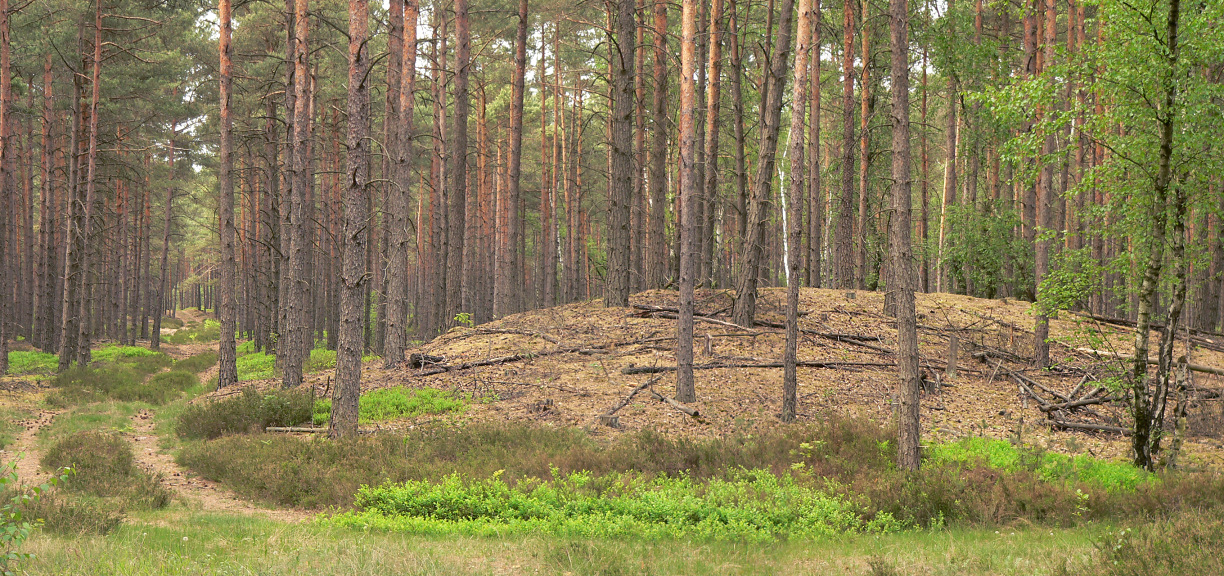
Inland dunes in the pine forest north of the Aller near Winsen an der Aller

After the Aller has passed through the hills of Saxony-Anhalt it enters the Wolfsburg area into the ice age drainage channel of the Aller glacial valley, part of the Breslau-Magdeburg-Bremen glacial valley. The valley is on average 20 kilometres (12 mi) wide and was formed during the penultimate ice age, the Saale glaciation about 200,000 years ago, and drained meltwaters from the ice sheet into the North Sea. The present course of the Aller in the miles-wide glacial valley does not reflect the courses of numerous streams of earlier centuries and millennia. For a long time there was a system of interwoven water courses, which changed their location and size depending on the materials and quantities of water being carried. Today there is a large number of dry oxbow lakes, river beds and branches in the water meadows. Climatic conditions and erosion also changed the landscape around the streams of the glacial valley. For example the wind formed inland sand dunes parallel to the river, especially on the northern side of the valley, around which the river sometimes snaked in meanders.

Near Wolfsburg the level of the river bed scarcely dropped at all and during times of low water it became almost an area of standing water. The Wolfsburg Volkswagen Plant uses the river and also feeds waste water, after cleaning, into its own sewage works.

Today, the landscape of the Aller valley between Celle and Verden is mainly utilised as grassland. The Aller depression there comprises valley floors lying close to the watertable, so that fertile wet areas may be found here with rich habitats for flora and fauna. The landscape is characterised by oxbows, potholes, copses and rows of bushes. The valley floors are widened by the depressions of the tributaries flowing into the Aller, so that fens and bogs can form. Around the lower reaches crops are cultivated on the clay soils. Around the upper course of the river, many pine forests are managed on the sandy soils.

== Tributaries ==
=== Rivers ===
The most important tributaries to join the Aller from its left-hand, southern, side facing the Harz mountains, are the Oker near Müden (Aller), the Fuhse in Celle, and the Leine near Schwarmstedt. If the Leine is counted as a source stream for the Aller, it has a total length of 346 kilometres (215 mi).

From the right, the Aller is joined by smaller rivers that predominantly drain the Lüneburg Heath. Those worth mentioning include the Kleine Aller fairly near Weyhausen, the Ise in Gifhorn, the Lachte east of Celle (near Lachtehausen), the Örtze near Winsen (Aller), the Meiße near Hodenhagen and the Böhme near Rethem.

=== Streams of the Upper Aller ===
The Upper Aller has numerous tributary streams between its source and Müden:

- Riole
- Schölecke
- Spetze
- Rote Riede
- Lapau
- Katharinenbach
- Drömlingsgräben
- Wipperaller
- Steekgraben and Hehlinger Bach
- Hasselbach
- Kronriede
- Beverbach
- Springriede
- Triangel Moor Canal
- Barnbruchgraben
- Gosebach
- Fulau
- Knesebach
- Emmerbach
- Kiekenbruchrönne
- Momerbach
- Kielhorster Graben
- Bruno
- Fischergraben
- Flotte
- Sauerbach
- Beberbach
- Platendorfer Moorgraben

=== Streams of the Aller Canal ===
The Aller Canal runs parallel to the Upper Aller between Wolfsburg and Gifhorn. The canal was built in the mid-19th century to reduce flooding. It has the following tributary streams:

- Mühlenriede
- Klein Brunsroder Riede
- Hehlenriede
- Rischmühlenriede
- Rötgesbütteler Riede
- Viehmoorgraben
- Vollbütteler Riede
- Wittesmoorgraben
- Allertalgraben
- Flettmarscher Abzuggraben

=== Streams of the Lower Aller ===
From the left, the following small rivers and brooks feed the Aller: the Alpe and the Wölpe near Rethem, the Lehrde near Kirchlinteln-Hohenaverbergen, the Gohbach near Verden-Eitze and, just before its mouth, the Halse near Verden-Dauelsen.

== Castles and monasteries ==
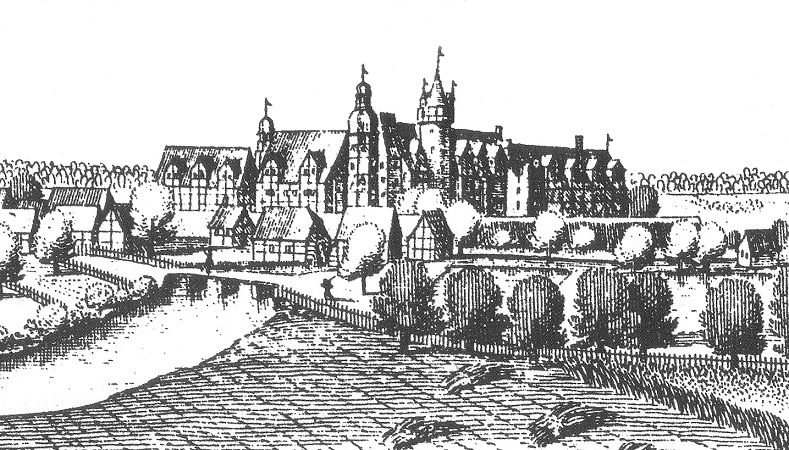
Merian copper engraving from the Renaissance castle of Hodenhagen-Hudemühlen on the Aller, 1654

- Bartensleben Castle, built as a water castle
- Oebisfelde Castle, built as a lowland castle (Niederungsburg) probably in the 10th century on a sand bank in the Aller in a swamp area of the Drömling
- Wolfsburg Castle, built as a tower house in the 14th century on the Aller and expanded into a water castle with fortifications
- Gifhorn Castle, completed in 1581 with fortifications
- Wienhausen Abbey, former Cistercian monastery from the 13th century
- Celle Castle, built in the 10th century as a fortified tower by a ford over the Aller
- Uhlenburg near Essel, built as a manor house in the 14th century
- Blankenburg Castle near Essel
- Ahlden House, built in 1549 as a water castle on the Aller; where the river bed became part of the Leine from 1618 when the Aller changed its course
- Bunkenburg, built as a circular rampart on the Aller in Ahlden (Aller) in the 13th century
- Hudemühlen Castle in the Hodenhagen sector of Hudemühlen, built in the 14th century as a castle, converted in the 16th century into a Renaissance schloss and demolished in the 19th century
- Bierde Castle near Bierde
- Hodenhagen Castle near Hodenhagen
- Blankenhagen Castle near Grethem
- Rethem Castle in Rethem (Aller), built in the 13th century and expanded into a bastioned site in the 17th century
- Verden Cathedral, built in the 12th century

== Culture and tourism ==
The Aller is one of the few – at least to all appearances – undisturbed larger rivers in Germany. From Celle as far as the Verden area it forms, together with the Leine, the attractive landscape of the Aller-Leine Valley. The Aller flows gently through relatively natural surroundings alongside meadows and woods, small villages and country towns. As a result, it is of great importance for those seeking relaxation in Lower Saxony with almost 4 million people in the conurbation of the Hanover-Brunswick-Göttingen-Wolfsburg Metropolitan Region. The Aller Cycle Way, which is around 250 kilometres (160 mi) long and generally follows the course of the river at some distance, is just one of the leisure attractions in the area. There are attempts to make tourism along the river more compatible with nature through the 'soft tourism' (Sanfte Tourismus) initiative, especially in the Aller-Leine Valley. Leisure options include canoeing or travelling by houseboat. Water skiing is allowed on short sections of the lower river.

== Hydrology ==
The river is the biggest tributary of the Weser. The catchment area of the Aller covers 15,744 square kilometres (6,079 mi^{2}), about one third that of the Weser itself. The water flow gauge at Rethem below the Aller's confluence with the Leine registers an average volumetric flow of 114 cubic metres (4,000 ft^{3}) per second.

The Aller receives via the Oker about half the run off from the Harz mountains (the other half drains into the Elbe via the Saale and other tributaries). Consequently, the Aller was and is frequently flooded by its tributaries. Since the commissioning of the dams in the Harz, it is now possible to limit the impact, especially of seasonal floods, e.g. by delaying and slowing down the release of meltwaters on the Oker and Ecker, the Innerste and the Grane in spring. As a result, the discharge of the Aller into the Weser can be largely controlled and, although the level varies, it can be kept within boundaries.

Very little of the Aller is shaded by woods (apart from the section along the Aller Canal). Direct sunlight on much of the river encourages the growth of aquatic plants and, in the absence of shady trees along its banks, the water becomes quite warm during the summer months.

=== Water velocity ===
The water velocity of the Aller is very slow in places. In its upper reaches, at the height of the Drömling, the water compares to a sluggish canal and, in some sections, it is almost like a stretch of still water. Its sluggishness is due to the very gradual slope of the channel, which in Lower Saxony averages a mere 10–20 centimetres per kilometre (0.53–1.06 ft/mi). Even in the upper course of the river, the flow across the whole of the stream bed is uniformly slow, due to the river having been widened and straightened. Here, the bed is covered by a mixture of sand and mud.

=== Sewage ===
Sewage from about half a million people is piped into the upper reaches of the Aller between its source and Müden/Aller, both directly and via its tributaries. The sewage is treated by 40 large sewage plants. Sewage from the town of Wolfsburg, the only city along the river, is not discharged into the river, but dispersed by sewage farms. The chemical composition of the Aller shows that the sewage discharged into it has generally been treated sufficiently well.

=== Heavy metal pollution ===
The pollution of the Aller by heavy metals has resulted from centuries of mining in the Harz mountains. Harz rivers, such as the Aller tributary of the Oker, picked up heavy metals from the mines and their spoil heaps. These were mainly cadmium, zinc and lead compounds that were concentrated into the suspended solids in the river. In this way, these chemicals were transported by the Oker into the Aller and Weser where they were deposited in the slacker-moving sections as sediments.

In 1999, investigations were carried out into the heavy metal content of the suspended material in the Aller near Verden. They showed that the Aller was polluting the Weser disproportionally with lead, cadmium, zinc and mercury.

=== Water quality ===
The Lower Saxon water quality report of 2004 assessed the chemical water pollution level of the Aller overall as moderately polluted (quality level II). Some individual indicators were rated as quality level I (unpolluted to very lightly polluted), some however showed heavy levels of pollution (quality levels III-IV). Heavy pollution is predominantly caused by nitrates. Pollution by ammonium in places is ascribed to the unsatisfactory operation of certain sewage works. Raised phosphate values were put down to intensive arable farming near the source of the river. Its salt content today is above the critical level for aquatic plants. Since 1990, the salt content has reduced considerably, which may be connected with lower discharges from the former East German area following the Wende in 1989. Biological water quality, based on the research into its saprobian systems, is generally rated as unpolluted to very lightly polluted. The only area that is critically contaminated is the region of Wolfsburg, where deposits of digested sludge in the river are responsible.

=== Flooding and historical flood protection ===
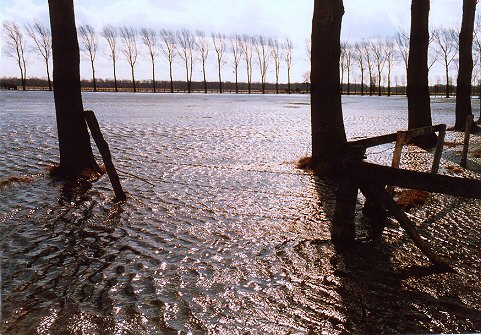
Spring flood in 1987 in the Drömling: the Aller at the level of the poplar avenue

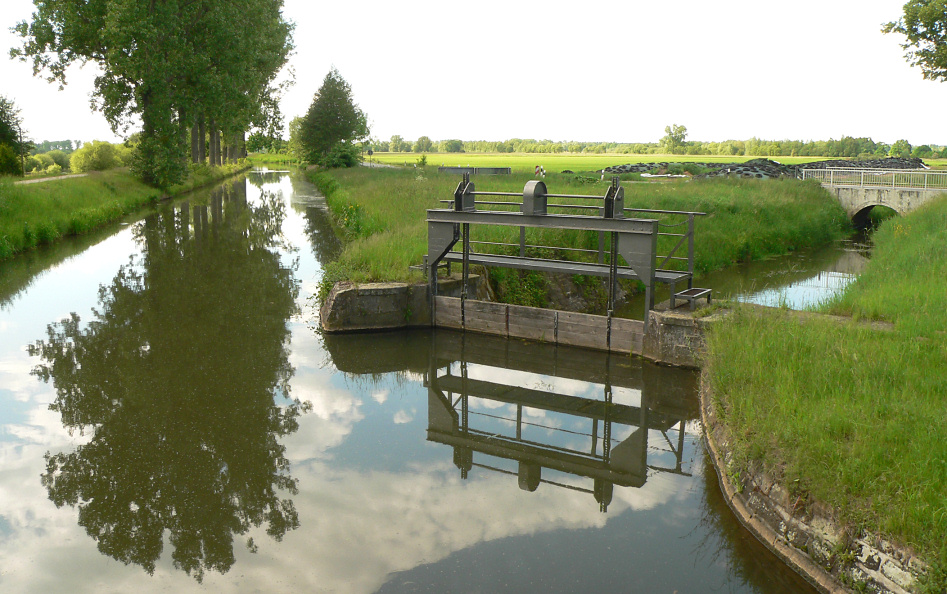
Start of the Aller spillway (right) near Grafhorst leading to the Ohre

In former times, there were frequently spring floods in the Aller depression that stayed for a long time. This was mainly due to the very gentle slope of the river from its entry into the ice age glacial drainage channel of the Breslau-Magdeburg-Bremen glacial valley. The river had to accept large quantities of water from the rivers Leine and Oker following snowmelt in the Leine Uplands and the Harz. In the upper courses the Aller filled the flat, swampy basin of the Drömling from which the water drained only slowly. In addition the Ohre river flowed diffusely through the Drömling. Because the watershed between Weser and Elbe lay in the middle of the Drömling, the river could even change its course so that the waters of the Aller flowed into the Elbe. The Prussian king, Frederick the Great, had the Prussian-owned eastern part of the Drömling drained between 1780 and 1796 and cleared for settlers (Kolonisten). His neighbours in western Drömling, in the shape of the Duchy of Brunswick and Hanover did not join the drainage project and only began to drain and control the Aller from 1860 onwards. They built the 20-kilometre-long (12 mi) Aller Canal from a place near Grafhorst to the area of Calvörde, through which the waters of the Aller could flow into the Ohre. Another canal built to prevent floods was the – equally named – Aller Canal, finished in 1863, which protected the Aller depression near Gifhorn. The construction of the Mittelland Canal in the 1930s enabled surplus water from the Aller to be drained off. That is achieved near Grafhorst by the Aller relief channel, a 3-kilometre-long (1.9 mi) canal. In spite of these measures there were floods in the Aller valley even in the 20th century that led to heavy losses for agriculture in the region.

=== Current flood protection ===
In the years 1954–1962, there was increased flooding along the Aller, which caused considerable damage to its water meadows. The flooded areas in the Aller valley varied between 300 and 5,000 metres (980 and 16,400 ft) wide, mainly due to the uneven flow of the river. In 1961, the Landtag of Lower Saxony decided to regulate the Aller by widening it. The aim was to protect settlements as well as the agricultural economy of the villages and towns along the course of the river which were generally poorly protected from flooding. Most of the measures to regulate the Aller were established in the 1960s. They were followed by the construction of a 15-hectare (37-acre) retention basin near Gifhorn in the 1970s. By contrast, plans for a retention basin on the bend in the Aller near Grafhorst were scrutinised between 1993 and 1996 on environmental grounds. The planned 12.5-square-kilometre (4.8 mi^{2}) "Fahle Heide" basin west of Gifhorn was never built due to lack of funding. As part of the widening of the Aller the banks were reshaped along large stretches. The state purchased strips of land up to 12 metres (39 ft) wide from those living along its banks. The banks were made flatter and lined with stones. Willows, alder and reed beds were planted. The Upper Aller was widened to 15 metres (49 ft), the Middle Aller to 30 metres (98 ft) and the Lower Aller from its confluence with the Leine to 50 metres (160 ft). Flood embankments were built along the Lower Aller near Rethem (Aller), Westen and Häuslingen.

==== Flood protection in Celle region ====
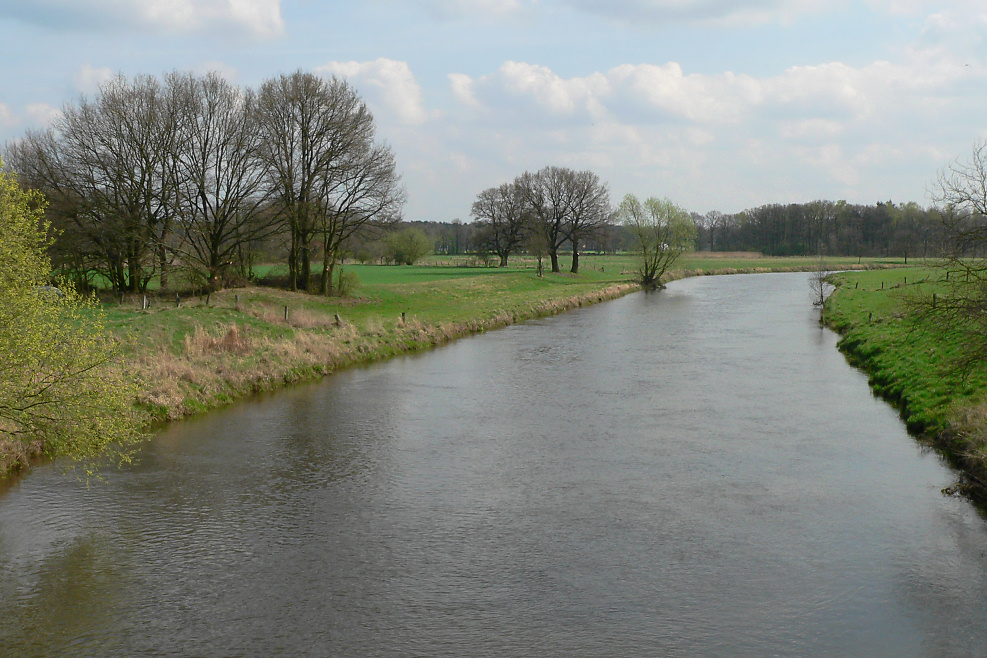
The canal-like widened Middle Aller near Altencelle

As early as the 1980s the town of Celle had drawn up a "Plan for Flood Protection of the Celle Region". This described a combination of widely varying measures, such as excavation of the river shore, flood basins and dykes. On 6 June 2005 the town received authority to start the first stage of the flood protection project. In 2006 work was begun. This first part of the work entailed excavation of the river shore between Boye and the confluence with the river Fuhse, which were intended to increase the cross-section of the Aller channel during high water periods. The flood basins have an area of about 15 hectares (37 acres) and are 1.5 metres (4.9 ft) deep, requiring about 240,000 cubic metres (8,500,000 ft^{3}) of earth to be washed away. The cost of the project came to around €2 million. Only two years later, it was determined that these first interventions of the river system had resulted in sand being permanently deposited in the Aller producing shoals. In May 2009, the shipping channel was dredged for the first time in the vicinity of the new flood basins so that ships could once again pass through. Now, it is planned to redesign the basins and, in some cases to fill them in, in order to reduce the future dumping of sand.

=== Fish Passage and Passability ===
In straightening the Aller in the 1960s the slope increased as the shortest route was taken. Ledges (Sohlabstürze) were built on the river bed to reduce erosion; these have since been converted to rock ramps (Sohlgleiten) in order to enable water organisms to pass more easily. There is no longer a barrier to fish at the weir near Grafhorst—designed to raise the water level during summer droughts—since it has been given a fish ladder. The migration of fish is however prevented by weirs near Gifhorn and Müden (Aller) and the locks of the Mittelland Canal near Wolfsburg-Wendschott. The Elbe Lateral Canal near Osloß flows freely under the Aller, however.

== Shipping ==
=== History ===
Shipping has plied the Aller for hundreds of years. It contributed to the economic growth of Brunswick, because the control of river transport fell into the hands of Duke Henry the Lion. Metals from the Harz were transported from Brunswick to the North Sea initially down the Oker and then down the Aller and Weser. In the 14th century, Celle was the most important grain loading point in the region that is today Lower Saxony. Around 1500, the ships on the Aller already had a capacity of about 60 tonnes (130 thousand pounds). The section of the Lower Aller between Celle and Verden had a particular high economic significance for shipping. Nevertheless, maintenance, repairs and modifications were very expensive. Between 1908 and 1918 the Aller was widened to provide permanent navigability between Celle and Verden. Four barrages were built, with locks for ships. At the beginning of the 20th century, potash salt, that had been extracted near Celle, was transported in large quantities on the Aller. Today there are no commercial ships left.

=== Today ===
Today, the Aller is a federal waterway from its mouth on the Weser to Celle. This section has a length of 117 kilometres (73 mi) and is known as the Lower Aller. The Verden Water and Shipping Office (Wasser- und Schifffahrtsamt Verden) is responsible for upgrades and new projects. With this authority, responsibility is further subdivided. The Oldau branch is responsible for the Aller from Celle to Hülsen 94.1 kilometres (58.5 mi) further downstream. In contrast, the Verden branch covers the river from Hülsen to its confluence with the Weser near Verden-Eissel 117.1 kilometres (72.8 mi) downstream from Celle.

Since the mid-1960s, only pleasure cruisers and sports boats have been used on the river above Verden towards its source.

=== Permitted ship sizes ===
- Mouth–Verden: waterway class III (length × width: 67 m × 9.50 m or 219.8 ft × 31.2 ft)
- Verden–Celle: waterway class II (length × width: 58 m × 9.50 m or 190.3 ft × 31.2 ft)
- Above Celle: not navigable

=== Locks ===
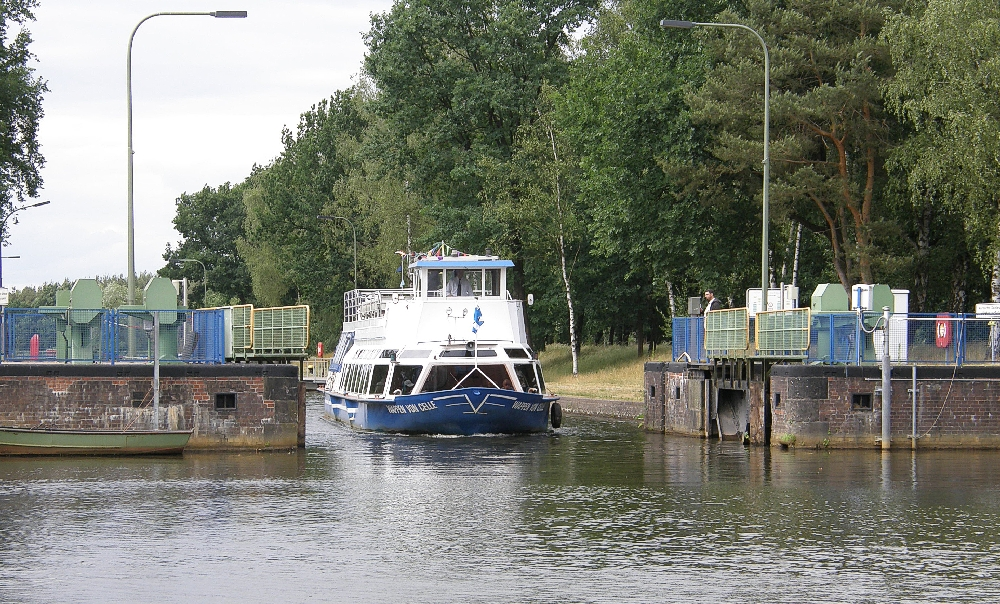
Oldau lock

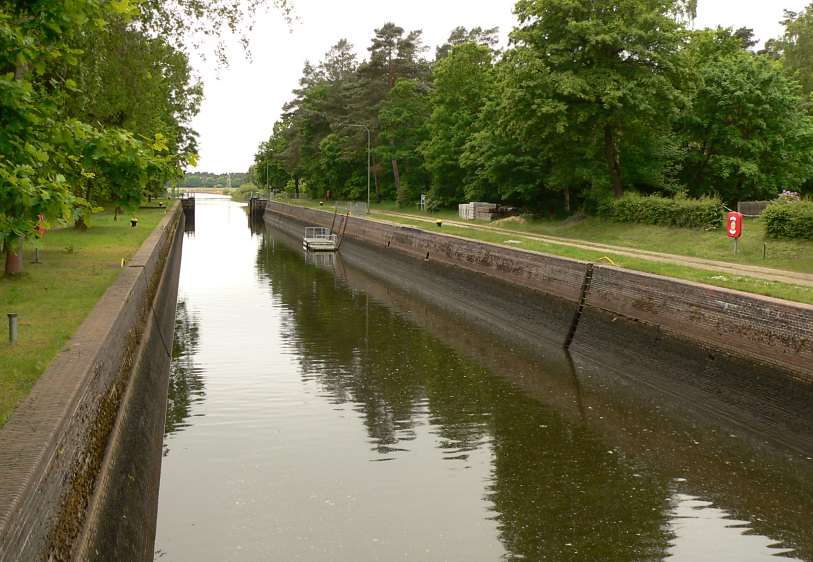
Bannetze lock basin

In 1907, the Prussian state decided to canalise the Aller from above its confluence with the Leine near Schwarmstedt downstream to Celle. In the years 1908 to 1918, the river was regulated by four barrages with locks and thus made navigable for larger inland ships. In particular, the Aller locks in Bannetze and Oldau enabled the transportation of crude oil from the oilfields of Wietze to Celle. Likewise, grain was shipped to Celle for milling.

Place	Location	Usable length	Usable width	Fall	Built
Oldau	14.7 km (9.1 mi)	159 m (522 ft)	10 m (33 ft)	3.21 m (10.5 ft)	1908–10
Bannetze	26.7 km (16.6 mi)	159 m (522 ft)	10 m (33 ft)	2.40 m (7 ft 10 in)	1909–12
Marklendorf	38.3 km (23.8 mi)	159 m (522 ft)	10 m (33 ft)	3.22 m (10.6 ft)	1914
Hademstorf	49.8 km (30.9 mi)	159 m (522 ft)	10 m (33 ft)	1.23 m (4 ft 0 in)	1914–18

=== Timber rafting ===
Timber rafting was probably being used on the Aller by the 14th century. The logs thus transported were used for construction as well as fuel. An early centre of timber rafting and the wood trade was the princely Residenz town of Celle. At first the nobility had the wood transported as fuel to heat Celle Castle and other royal buildings. The timber was felled in the royal forests. The transportation of logs by raft was roughly 10 times more efficient than moving it by horse and cart.

A major rafting operation took place on the Aller in 1680 when a large quantity of construction wood was floated down to the Weser and its mouth. The wood came from the southern Lüneburg Heath and was used to build around 100 houses in the Swedish fort of Carlsburg on the site of present-day Bremerhaven.

From the 17th century, wood was also rafted down the Aller tributaries, such as the Ise and Örtze to Celle. In Celle, the logs collected at a needle dam in the Aller Land and were stored in a wood yard. Rafts also ran past Celle and down the Weser to Bremen. After the death of George William, Duke of Brunswick-Lüneburg in 1705, timber rafting on the Upper Aller to Celle fell into decline. When the royal household moved to Hanover, Celle lost the baroque lustre of a Residenz town. Raft dealers took over the business. On the Lower Aller, timber rafting flourished again at the end of the 19th century during the Gründerzeit. There was a large demand for wood in Bremen, Bremerhaven and the Weser Marshes, where wood was used for the construction of houses and shipbuilding. In the years around 1895, about 8,000 solid cubic metres (280,000 cu ft) of wood were rafted down to the Weser. After the First World War, timber rafting on the Aller dwindled to nothing.

== Water power ==
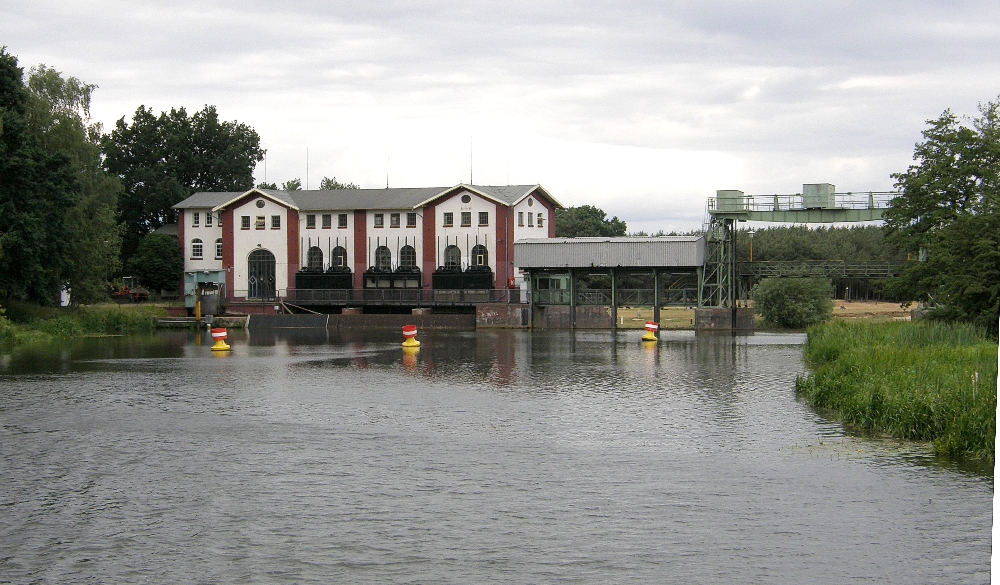
Oldau waterworks

In upgrading the Aller between Celle and the mouth of the Leine near Schwarmstedt between 1908 and 1918, hydropower stations were built at two of the four new barrages: Oldau and Marklendorf. They enabled the electrification of the Südheide. The Oldau station, with three Francis turbines, was taken over in 1929 by PreussenElektra. In 1972, the power stations were closed as they were unprofitable. Whilst the structure in Marklendorf was demolished, the power station in Oldau was declared a technological monument and escaped destruction. After being modernised in 1983, it rejoined the grid. It has largely been preserved in its original state. Here, the water power of the Aller, with the aid of Francis turbines with a nominal power of 650 kW, is used to generate 3 million kWh per year of electric current.

== See also ==
- List of rivers of Saxony-Anhalt
- List of rivers of Lower Saxony

== Sources ==
- Delfs, Jürgen (1995). Die Flößerei auf Ise, Aller und Örtze [The Rafting on Ise, Aller and Örtze] (in German). Landkreis Gifhorn: Gifhorn. ISBN 3-929632-24-1. OCLC 237345239.
- Kersting, Wilhelm Christian (1979). Die ausgleichenden Maßnahmen des Umweltschutzes bei der Hochwasserregulierung der Aller [The Compensatory Measures of Environmental Protection in the Flood Control of the Aller] (in German). Celle: Fritz Steiniger und Henry Makowski, Schweiger und Pick Verlag. OCLC 8495528.
