= Kleine Aller =

River in Germany

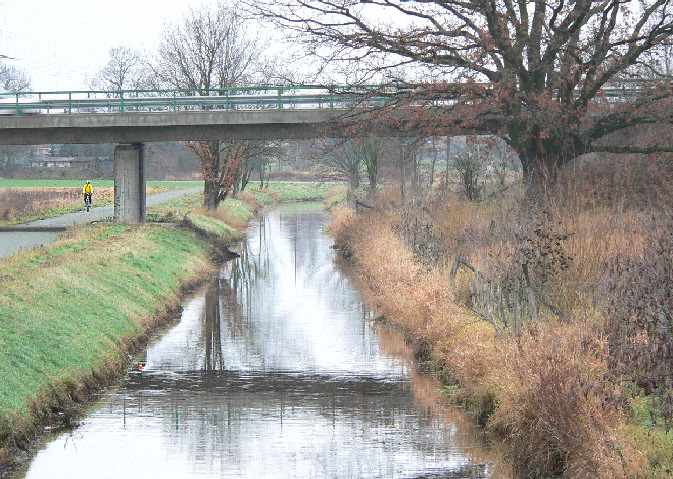
- The Kleine Aller where it passes under the B188 near Wolfsburg-Warmenau

Location
- Country: Germany
- State: Lower Saxony

Physical characteristics
- Mouth
  - location: Aller
  - coordinates: 52.4508°N 10.7303°E
- Length: 22.9 km (14.2 mi)
- Basin size: 144 km^{2} (56 sq mi)

Basin features
- Progression: Aller→ Weser→ North Sea

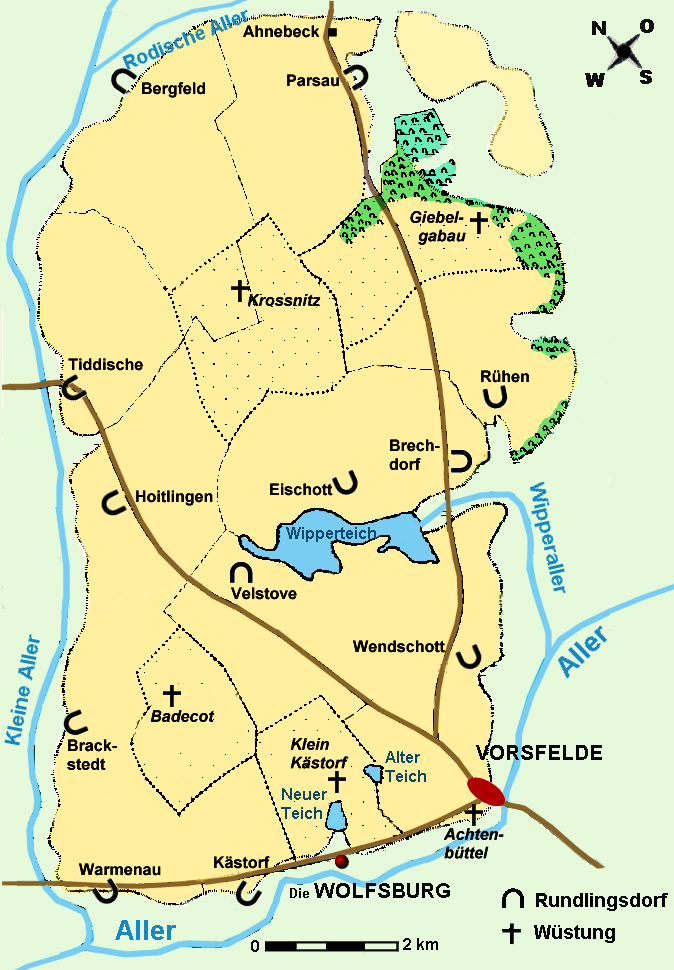
Route of the Kleine Aller west of the Vorsfelder Werder. 18th century map

The Kleine Aller is a tributary of the Aller in the German state of Lower Saxony. It is about 23 kilometres (14 mi) long and up to 5 metres (16 ft) wide, and flows from north to south through the district of Gifhorn and the city of Wolfsburg.

== Course ==
The Kleine Aller rises in the Brome village of Wiswedel at 78 m above sea level. It drains the Kiebitzmoor west of Tülau, through a system of ditches that has been continually expanded over the years, and also drains the Vogelmoor north of Barwedel. In this region it is joined by the tributary of the Rhodische Aller. Finally the Kleine Aller flows southwards, past Bergfeld, Barwedel, Tiddische, Hoitlingen and Jembke. From Jembke it forms the border between the district of Gifhorn and the city of Wolfsburg. The river also passes Wolfsburg-Brackstedt and Wolfsburg-Warmenau to enter the Aller Canal south of Weyhausen at a height of 55.5 m above sea level and at a point a few hundred metres after it branches away from the River Aller itself.

The sections near Tülau, Bergefeld and Tiddische have been renaturalised and, in places, a new river channel has been dug out. The near-natural areas thus created have been planted with alder. This provides important areas of shade because much of the river is directly illuminated by the sun, something which leads to rapid weed growth and choking of the river bed.

== Formation and history ==
The river channel was formed, like the surrounding landscape, in the penultimate ice age, the Saale glaciation. The ice sheets shaped the terrain over 100,000 years ago with their ground moraines. The streams acted as drainage channels for the higher lying areas of geest in the Aller glacial valley.

In the Middle Ages the valley of the Kleine Aller created a natural, north-south oriented border between two regions. These were the Boldecker Land in the west and the historic landscape of the Vorsfelder Werder in the east.

The Kleine Aller has been able to carve out a valley during the course of its existence which, in its middle reaches, is about 10 m deep and about 1,000 m wide in which a eutrophic peat fen has become established. In earlier times the valley was only used as grassland due to frequent flooding; today the river meadows are mainly used for arable farming. The old meandering Kleine Aller was straightened and canalised in 1865 along almosts its entire length. The river bed was also raised. The changes to the river and the lack of flooding has enabled the land in the valley depression of the Kleine Aller to be used as farmland.

== Water quality ==
Near Warmenau there has been a water quality station since 1967, where water quality has been regularly tested since 1976. The 2004 Lower Saxon water quality report assesses the chemical water pollution of the Kleine Aller as variable. The values for organic pollution, nitrate, ammonium and phosphate contamination vary from lightly polluted to very heavily polluted. Ammonium levels in particular suffer from wide variations and sometimes high values. This is due to the fact that the waterway receives the discharge from five sewage works and that the nitrogen content in these installations has not been reduced sufficiently.

== See also ==
- List of rivers of Lower Saxony
