= Wippermühle =

Coordinates: 52°28′25″N 10°52′21″E

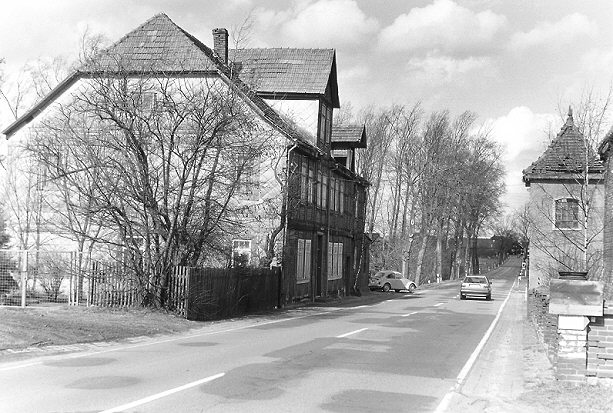
The Wippermühle mill in 1986. Left: the old mill building

The Wippermühle was a watermill in the historic landscape of Vorsfelder Werder in the North German state of Lower Saxony. It was first mentioned in the records in 1366 and was finally closed in 1936. It was driven by the Wipperaller stream which drained the old pond known as the Wipperteich. Today, the old mill lies within the city of Wolfsburg immediately on its boundary with the municipality of Rühen (Gifhorn district).

== Location ==
In previous centuries, the mill lay off the beaten track. The old military road from Vorsfelde to Brome ran past several hundred metres to the west. Since the road was moved in the 19th century, it has run through the middle of the mill yard, which has one building on either side of the road. On 19th century maps, there are several buildings in the shape of a small hamlet. Today the state road from Wolfsburg-Wendschott to Brechtorf carries a large amount of through traffic that runs past the old watermill.

== Name ==
The name Wippermühle comes from the name of the stream that drives it, the Wipperaller. This name in turn is derived from the river it flows into, the Aller, prefixed by the word Wipper. Wipper comes from the Old Slavic word vepri which means Eber or wild boar. The Slavic tribe known as the Wends, who lived here on the Vorsfelder Werder until the Middle Ages, named many villages and streams in their own language.

== Mill ==
The mill has been in existence since the Middle Ages as a watermill, powered by the Wipperaller stream. This stream rises on the ridge of the Vorsfelder Werder near Hoitlingen. It still drains the gently sloping, expanse of the Wipperteich bowl today and flows down into the Drömling. After about 11 km the Wipperaller discharges into the Aller near Wolfsburg-Vorsfelde. Because the Wipperaller is only a small stream, it is likely that the Wipperteich had already been dammed by the Middle Ages. The exit to the pond enables the mill to be operated all year round even in times of low precipitation. In 1841, however, the pond did run dry.

== History ==
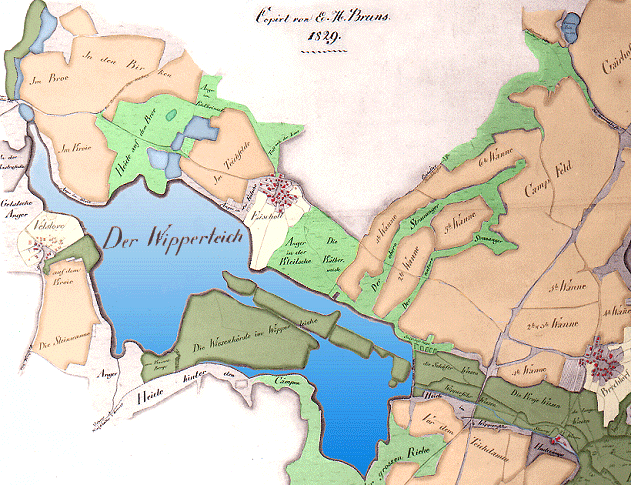
The Wipperteich (1829) drove the Wippermühle (red dot, lower right)

The first recorded mention of the Wippermühle is in 1366 in a list of levies drawn up by the town of Brunswick, which says: De mole up deme wipperbeke ghift VI.sol (The mill on the Wipperbach gives 6 schillings). The villages of the Vorsfelder Werder were required to pay levies to the town of Brunswick, which the Duke William of Brunswick-Lüneburg retained as a pledge.

During the Thirty Years War, that saw the areas like the Vorsfelder Werder ravaged by plundering, devastation and famine, the watermill collapsed. In 1654, it was named once more in an enfeoffment. The mill owner, Heinrich Wippermüller borrowed 30 talers for six years after the end of the war from Vorsfelder citizen Hans Hoppe to rebuild the mill and paid the tax with grazing rights on his meadows. In 1658, it was recorded in the documents that the miller had paid 25 groschen house interest for his mill, the property tax of its day. From 1674, the miller was regularly reminded to keep the Wipperaller free of vegetation and, in 1709, issued with a warning about it. In 1850, the mill burned down and was rebuilt 50 metres further south at its present location. In 1936, the mill was closed. Electrically driven mills were more profitable. After the end of the Second World War in 1945, former forced labourers killed the last miller near his mill as they plundered it.

== See also ==
- Wipper
