= Wolfsburg Castle =

Castle in Lower Saxony, Germany

- Schloss Wolfsburg, Burg Wolfsburg
- Wolfsburg
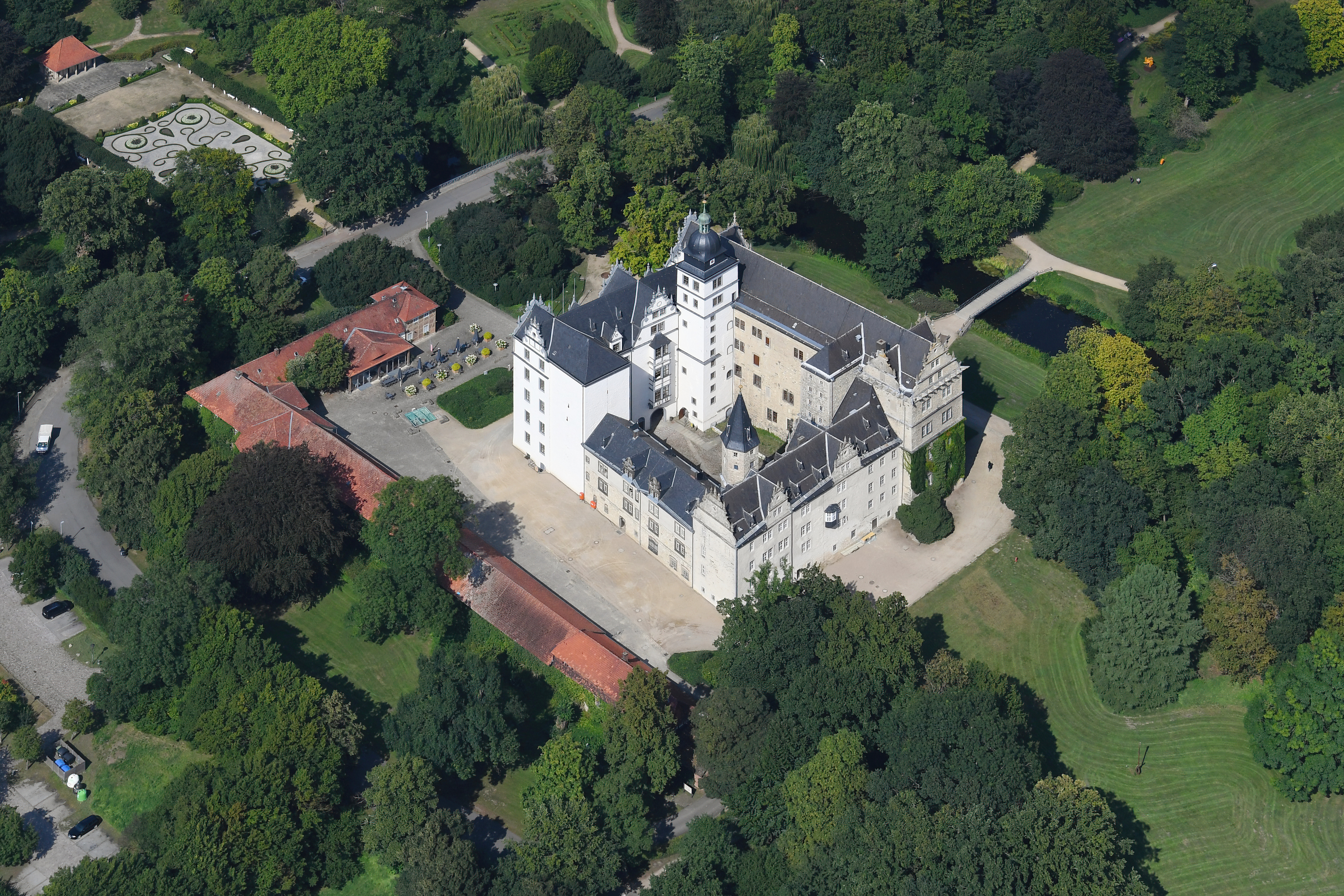
- Aerial view of the Wolfsburg

Site information
- Type: lowland castle
- Code: DE-NI
- Condition: converted to a Renaissance palace

Location
- Location within Lower Saxony Location within Germany
- Coordinates: 52°26′21″N 10°47′58″E

Site history
- Built: first mentioned 1302

Garrison information
- Occupants: nobility

The Wolfsburg is a medieval lowland and water castle in North Germany that was first mentioned in the records in 1302, but has since been turned into a Renaissance schloss or palace. It is located in eastern Lower Saxony in the town of Wolfsburg named after it and in whose possession it has been since 1961. The Wolfsburg developed from a tower house on the River Aller into a water castle with the character of a fortification. In the 17th century it was turned into a representative, but nevertheless defensible palace that was the northernmost example of the Weser Renaissance style. Its founder and builder was the noble family of von Bartensleben. After their line died out in 1742 the Wolfsburg was inherited by the counts of Schulenburg.

== Name ==
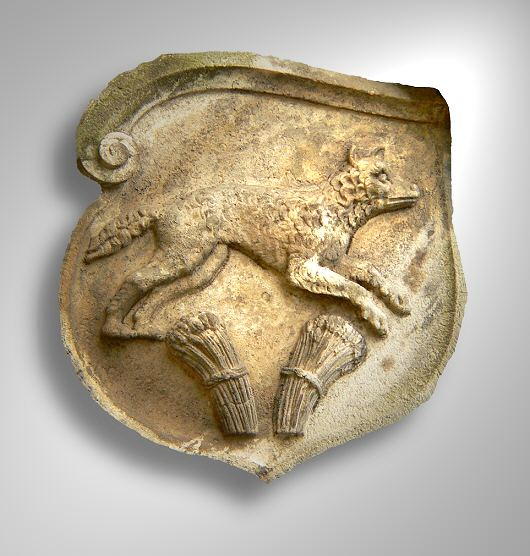
Wolf coat of arms over the entrance

The name Wolfsburg (literally "Wolf Castle") does not indicate that the region of the Vorsfelder Werder in which the castle is located had a large number of wolves, even though there were certainly wolves in the nearby wet meadows of the Drömling. The wolf that gave its name to the castle is a heraldic beast on the coat of arms of the von Bartensleben family who built the edifice. Their coat of arms comprises a leaping wolf above two sheaves of corn. The family brought the name "wolf" with them, because they can be traced back to 1188 when they were still living at Bartensleben Castle in the village of Bartensleben about 40 kilometres to the south. In the 20th century, the city built here in 1938 was named after Wolfsburg Castle. Initially it was called the Stadt des KdF-Wagens ("Town of the Strength through Joy Car") because of the industrial plant established to build the Volkswagen. After the end of the Second World War, the city council decided to rename the city Wolfsburg on 25 May 1945.

== Design ==
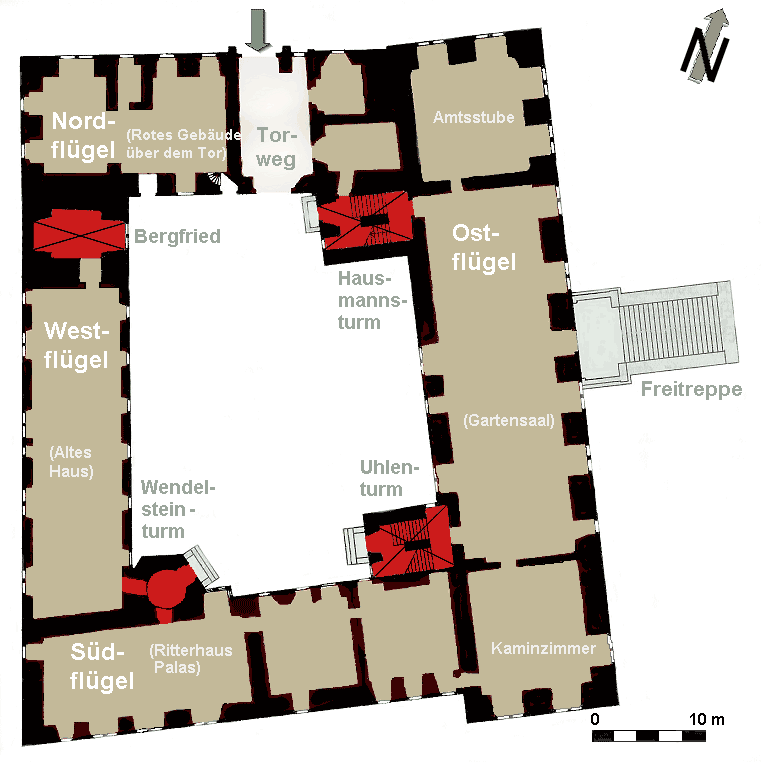
Present ground plan of the Wolfsburg (towers in red)

=== Main structure ===
Since the 17th century the castle has been a four-sided, solid building surrounding an inner courtyard. The main body of the castle thus has four wings, which are named after the points of the compass. The upper outline of the castle with its finely decorated cross-gables, lucarnes and pointed roofs of the wall towers form a contrast with the fortification-like walls.

=== Entrance ===
Outsize stone figures on horseback decorate the palace entrance with its round arch. Above the portal there are stone shields with the coat of arms of the Bartenslebens, chimera (Neidköpfe) and equestrian figures. The portal architecture, like the terrace with its great perron on the park side, is a 19th-century addition.

=== Bergfried ===
The bergfried is integrated as an element of the west wing into the main structure and is recognisable as such by its lack of decoration and windows. The tower has an area of 9 × 9 metres, a height of around 23 metres and wall thickness of up to 3 metres. It is the oldest part of the whole site and its origins may go back to the 13th century.

=== Towers ===
In the internal corners of the courtyard there are three other towers with staircases that enable the individual floors to be accessed. These are the Watchman's Tower (Hausmannsturm) which at around 30 metres is the highest, the Owl Tower (Uhlenturm) and the hexagonal Wendelstein tower with its circular staircase. They were built in the 16th century as the castle was converted into a palace.

=== Wings ===
The north and south wings from the 16th century were mainly used for residential purposes. The roughly 25 metre high east wing was completed at the beginning of the 17th century. With its splendid decorative shapes in the Weser Renaissance style, it was very much an ostentatious reception building. On the ground floor there is a 30 metre long and 9 metre wide hall, the present Garden Hall (Gartensaal). Adjacent to it is a smaller hall the Chamber Room (Kaminzimmer) and the Gerichtlaube (district office). From the inner courtyard the wing shows traces of an arcade that once ran in front of it. At roof height it is surrounded by corbels that presumably once carried a wooden wall walk. This wing of the building clearly shows how, by the end of the 16th century, the power of the von Bartenslebens was visibly demonstrated through their architecture.

== History ==
=== Foundation ===
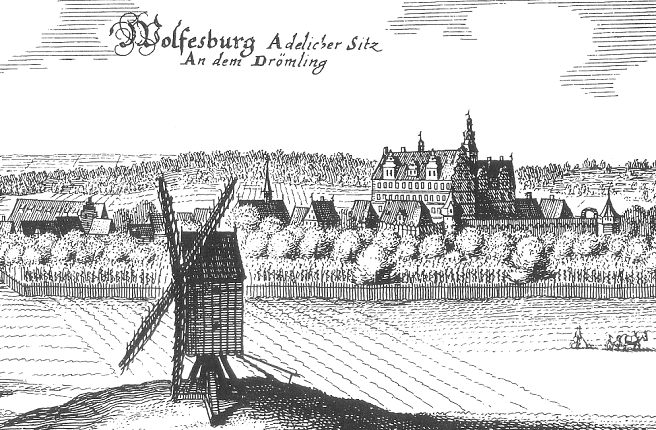
1654 Merian copperplate of the Wolfsburg

The reason for the construction of the Wolfsburg was the enfeoffment of land in the area of the present-day city of Wolfsburg to the noble family of von Bartensleben in the 13th century. These knights also watched over the trade routes where they crossed the River Aller and that entailed the construction of a fortification to protect their lordship. The first definite record of the castle was in 1302 where it is referred to as the Wluesborch. The document is made out by the four brothers: Borchard, Günzel, Günter and Werner von Bartensleben. They were a ministerialis family (unfree knights), who came from the village of Bartensleben near Helmstedt. Their family members appeared at that time in the region, including in 1288 at the castle in Vorsfelde. In addition there is another record dating to 1135, but it is not clear whether this refers to the Wolfsburg or a predecessor castle. Emperor Lothar III then awarded the newly founded Benedictine abbey of Kaiserdom Königslutter with diversified estates, including a Wulvosburg, that was named in connection with the village of Käsdorf.

=== Middle Ages and Early Modern Period ===
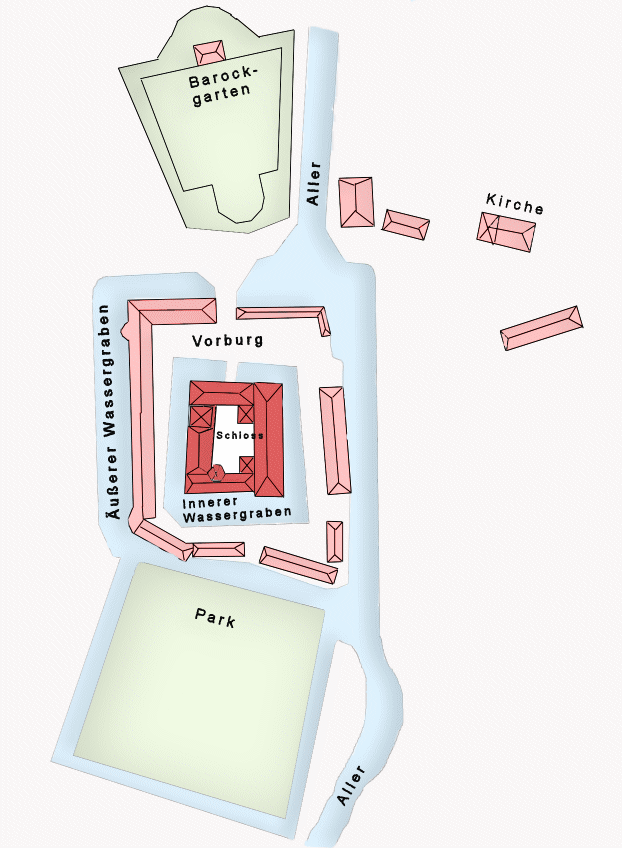
Palace and grounds around 1800

During the Middle Ages the castle was not an enclosed site, but consisted of the bergfried and an attached building, the Old House (Altes Haus) in the present west wing. The site was a strong fortification of considerable strategic importance. Later it was even equipped with cannon, for according to a 1437 document the number of guns was to be increased by 10 pieces in the event of war. According to this record, there were only attacks on the castle during the feud of the von Bartenslebens against Duke Otto of Lüneburg in 1464, whereby it was intended to be largely demolished (mehrentheils demoliret worden seyn).

The Wolfsburg emerged from the Thirty Years' War as one of the few aristocratic castles that remained undestroyed. It was almost continuously garrisoned by troops of the warring parties, the last being the Swedes. The lords of Brunswick and Magdeburg forced their withdrawal came in 1650 by having the castellans have the fortifications slighted. Six years later the von Bartenslebens had the fortifications rebuilt because they wanted to retain the military character of the castle.

== Construction history ==
=== Medieval castle ===
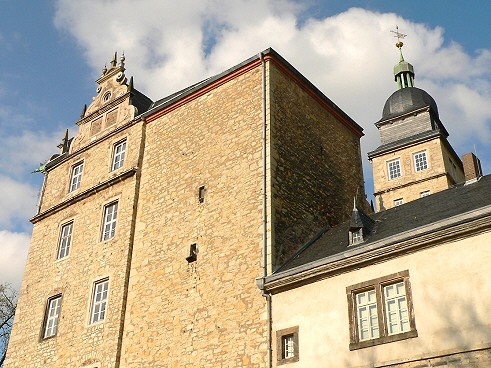
West side. Left: north wing, centre:bergfried, right: west wing Altes Haus, behind: Hausmannsturm

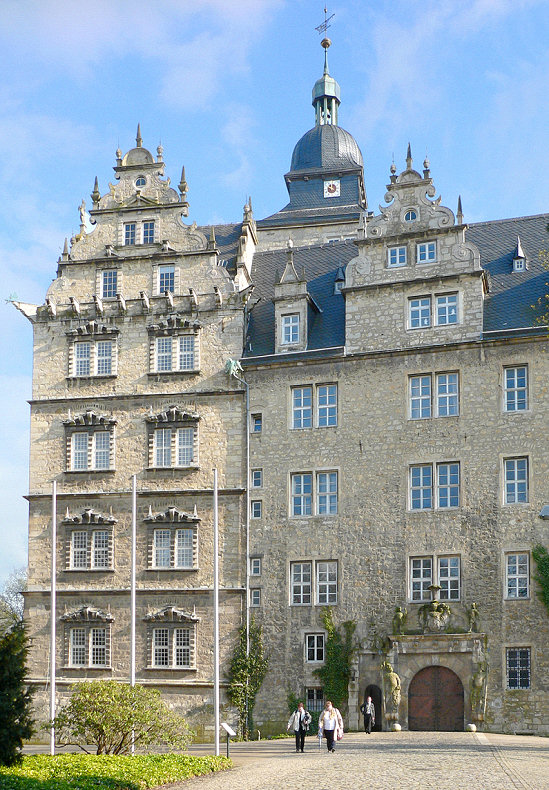
North wing entrance. Left: typical Weser Renaissance decorations on the east wing

In the early stages around 1300 the Wolfsburg only had a stone tower house (Wohnturm) on the Aller, whose precursor may have been a wooden watchtower in the style of a lowland motte. The present, roughly 23 metre high tower, later designated as the bergfried, is the oldest surviving part of the present site. It was accessible halfway up by a wooden staircase or ladder that could be hauled up in the face of enemy attack. To begin with, it may have been the tower house of the von Bartenslebens themselves. Over time it did not do justice to as an aristocratic residence and domestic building, and as a consequence other buildings and fortifications were constructed. Within the later castle, the bergfried acted as a dungeon and prison.

Due to its situation in the Aller valley, the castle was probably surrounded by water from the outset. Certainly until the 19th century it was protected by two moats that were fed from the nearby Aller and the Hasselbach stream. The inner moat encircled the castle itself which, together with its drawbridges, made it a water castle. The outer moat surrounded the larger outer ward (Vorburg), a refuge place for the lord's subjects in time of war. In addition this area was protected by a curtain wall with defensive bastions or Rondellen, against which the later domestic buildings and stables, the present coach houses (Remisen) were built. Investigations in recent times revealed that the castle was not, as previously suspected, built on piles in boggy terrain. For the most part it stands on a sandy subsoil and only rests in places on oak piles.

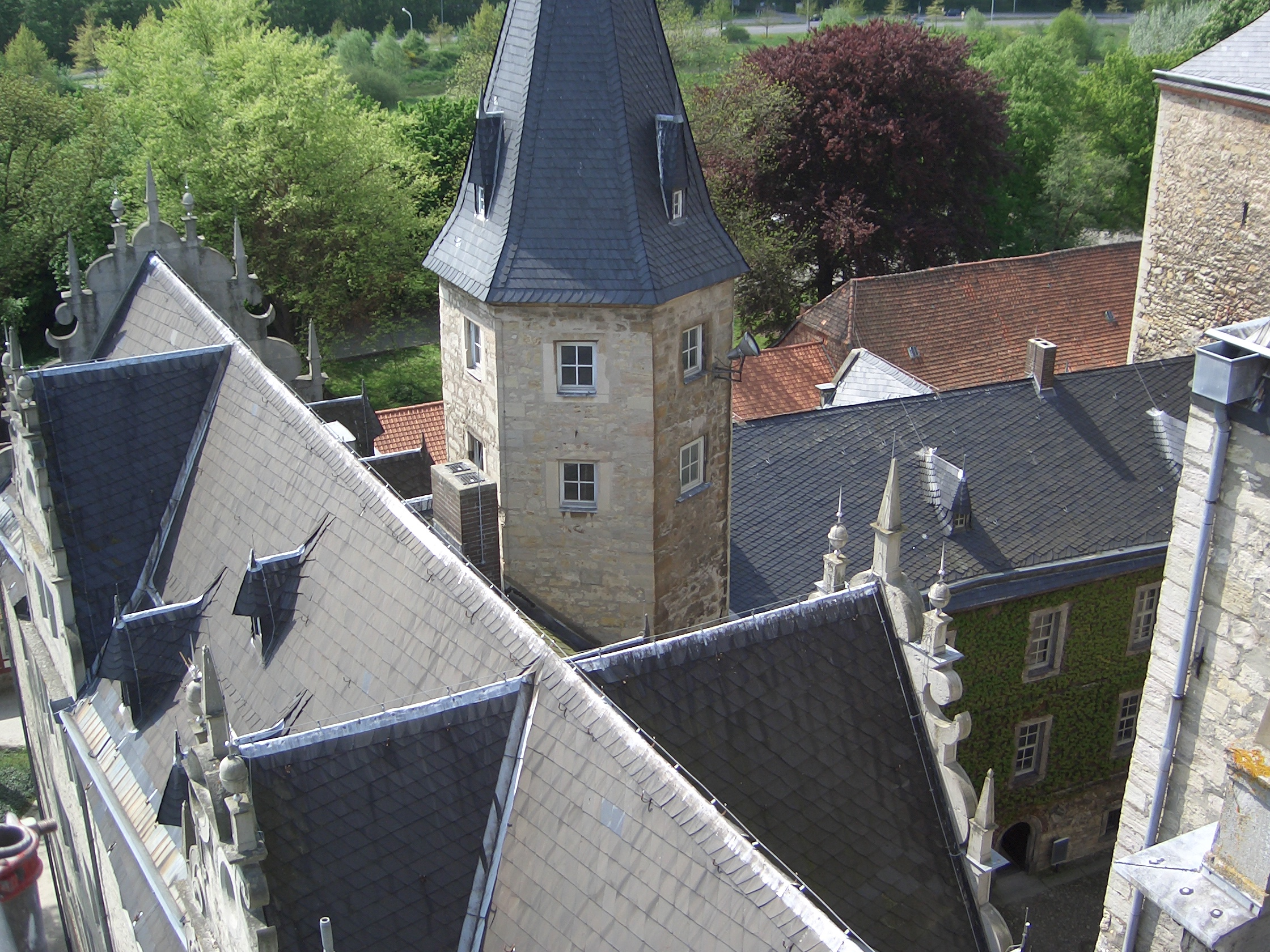
View of the southwest corner with its staircase tower, the Wendelsteinturm

=== Weser Renaissance palace ===
In the middle of the 15th century, a medieval castle no longer reflected the status of the von Bartenslebens. They turned the less comfortable building into a showy palace in the Weser Renaissance style with gardens and parks. Nevertheless, it retained the character of a fortified water castle until 1840, when the protective moats were filled in as the Aller river was artificially confined and controlled.

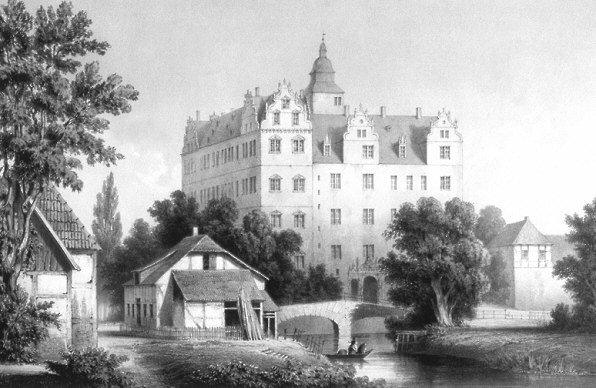
The water castle around 1840 (view of the north wing)

In 1574, thanks to his great fortune, Hans von Bartensleben, the Wealthy (der Reiche), was able to begin the conversion of the castle. For this work he employed masons, stonemasons and carpenters, whom he paid. The socage rendered him by the peasants of the villages of the Vorsfelder Werder provided free manual labour as well as horses and carts. When the Bartenslebens unduly imposed on them, the farmers complained (for example in 1600) to their overlord, Duke Henry Julius of Brunswick-Wolfenbüttel. From then on, socage was restricted to "only" ten hours in summer and eight hours in winter, twice a week, although travel time from the villages, which were up to 15 kilometres away, was not counted.

Hans the Wealthy had the Red House (Rotes Haus), a section of the building that had fallen into disrepair, demolished and erected in its place the present north wing with the entranceway to the schloss. When he died in 1583, his relative Günzel, his brother Günther and their uncle Jakob continued the work and built the ostentatious east wing. Then followed the south wing as the Palas with its Great Hall. Not until 1620 was the palace completed in its present shape as a four-winged building with enclosed courtyard and outside dimensions of 50 × 60 metres.

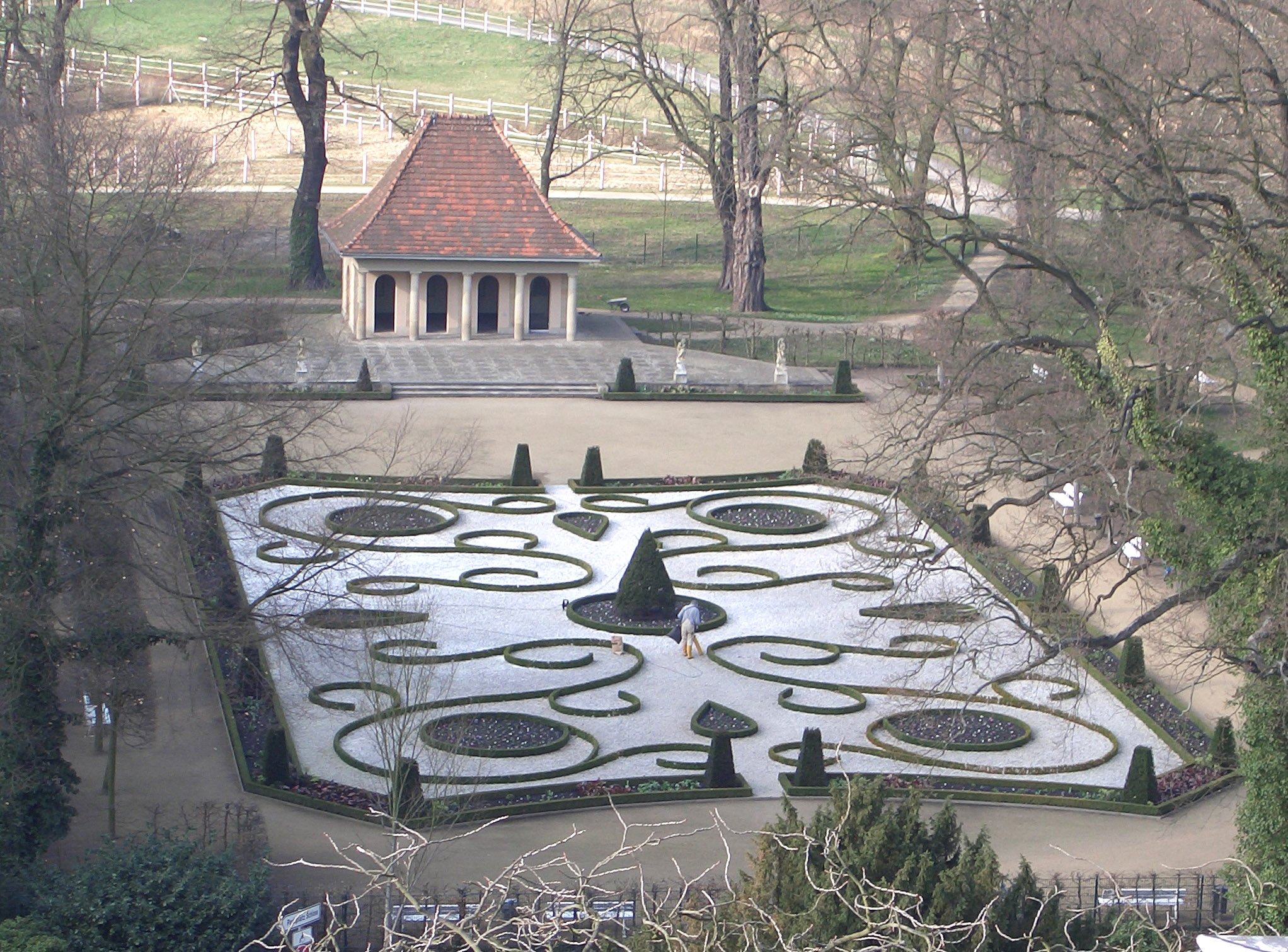
Baroque garden (Broderie parterre) and tea house

In converting it into a Renaissance palace, architecture and ornamentation were influenced by the Weser Renaissance style, of which the Wolfsburg is a typical example, as well as the most northeasterly one. The builders, stonemasons and sculptors who took part had also been involved in building palaces in the Weser region, for example, the Hamelin builder, Johann Edeler (also: Johann von der Mehle).

== Literature ==
- Johannes Zahlten: Schloss Wolfsburg – Ein Baudenkmal der Weserrenaissance. Braunschweig 1991, ISBN 3-925151-52-4
- Schloss Wolfsburg – Geschichte und Kultur. Stadt Wolfsburg, Wolfsburg 2002, ISBN 3-930292-62-9
- Historisch-Landeskundliche Exkursionskarte von Lower Saxony, Blatt Wolfsburg. S. 145, Veröffentlichungen des Instituts für historische Landesforschung der Universität Göttingen, Hildesheim 1977, ISBN 3-7848-3626-7
- Hans Adolf Schultz: Burgen und Schlösser des Braunschweiger Landes. Braunschweig 1980, ISBN 3-87884-012-8
