= Viehmoorgraben =

River in Germany

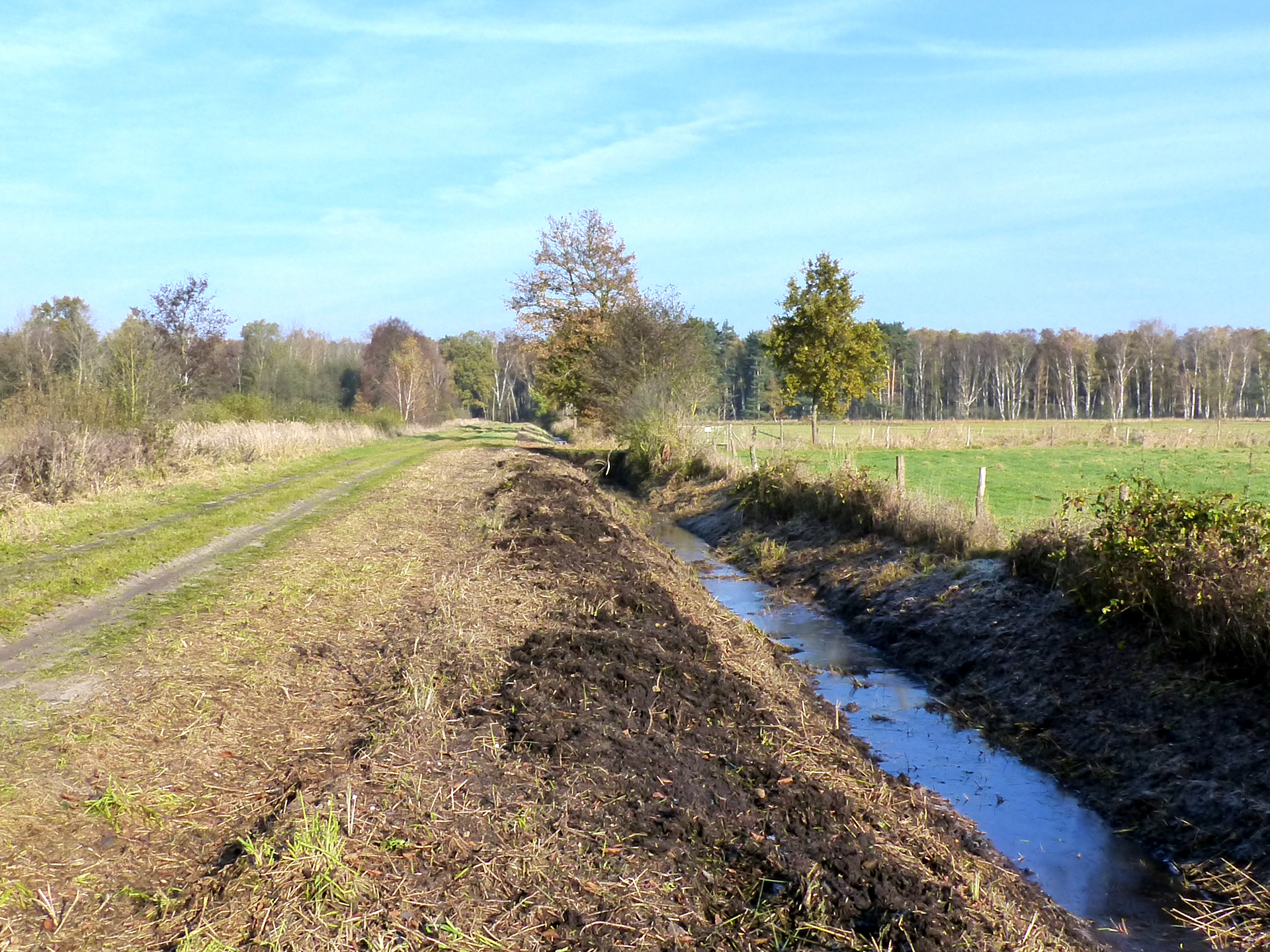

Location
- Country: Germany
- State: Lower Saxony

Physical characteristics
- Mouth
  - location: Aller Canal
  - coordinates: 52.4650°N 10.4793°E

Basin features
- Progression: Aller Canal→ Aller→ Weser→ North Sea

The Viehmoorgraben is a small river of Lower Saxony, Germany. The 7.3 km river flows into the Aller Canal west of Gifhorn.

== See also ==
- List of rivers of Lower Saxony
