= Mühlenriede =

River in Germany

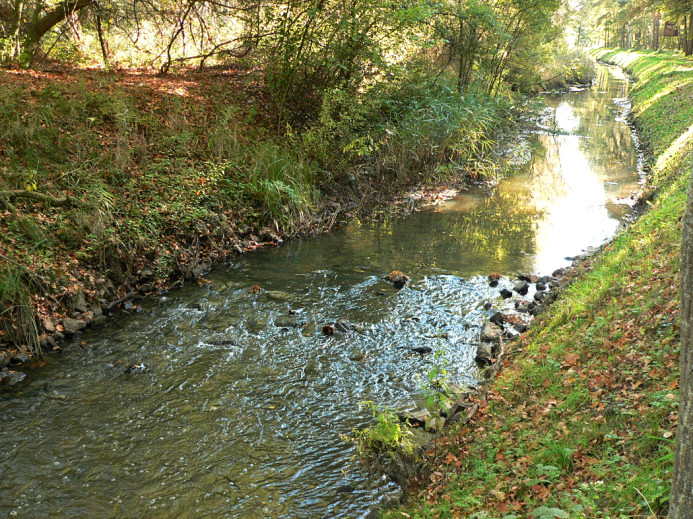

Location
- Country: Germany
- State: Lower Saxony

Physical characteristics
- Mouth
  - location: Aller Canal
  - coordinates: 52.4619°N 10.6081°E
- Length: 17.5 km (10.9 mi)

Basin features
- Progression: Aller Canal→ Aller→ Weser→ North Sea

The Mühlenriede is a river of Lower Saxony, Germany. It flows into the Aller Canal southeast of Gifhorn.

== See also ==
- List of rivers of Lower Saxony
