= Gohbach =

River in Germany

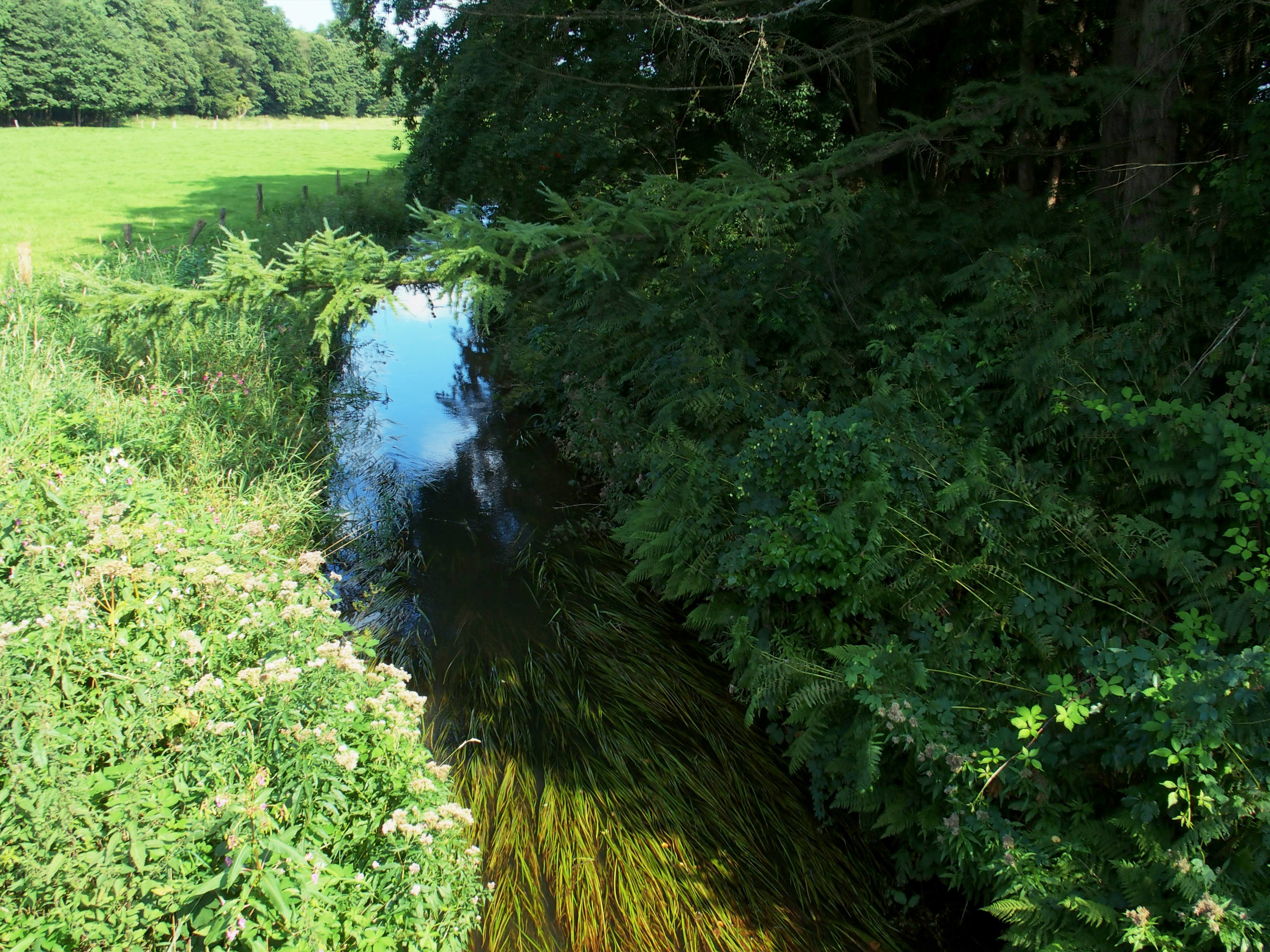
- View from the Specken Bridge (Kirchlinteln) of the Gohbach in summer

Location
- Country: Germany
- State: Lower Saxony

Physical characteristics
- Source
  - location: northwest of Dreeßel (part of Visselhövede)
  - coordinates: 52°58′56″N 9°27′18″E
  - elevation: 54 m above sea level (NN)
- Mouth
  - location: In Eitze, a borough of Verden an der Aller
  - coordinates: 52°54′16″N 9°16′30″E
  - elevation: 11 m above sea level (NN)
- Length: 24.34 km
- Basin size: 107 km²
- Discharge
  - location: at the mouth
  - average: 0.710 m^{3}/s (25.1 cu ft/s)

Basin features
- Progression: Aller→ Weser→ North Sea
- Landmarks: Villages: Brunsbrock (part of Kirchlinteln), Weitzmühlen (part of Kirchlinteln), Eitze (part of Verden an der Aller)
- Tributaries
  - right: Schmobach, Gibbach, Lindhooper Graben

The Gohbach is a 20-kilometre (12 mi) long, right-hand tributary of the Aller in Lower Saxony, Germany.

== Course ==
The Gohbach rises in the district of Rotenburg in the borough of Visselhövede near the village of Dreeßel. From there it runs southwest through the area of Kirchlinteln in Verden district and within the territory of the town of Verden an der Aller, where it discharges into the Aller at Eitze.

== See also ==
- List of rivers of Lower Saxony
