= Aller Canal =

Canal in Lower Saxony, Germany

Coordinates: 52.4778°N 10.4653°E

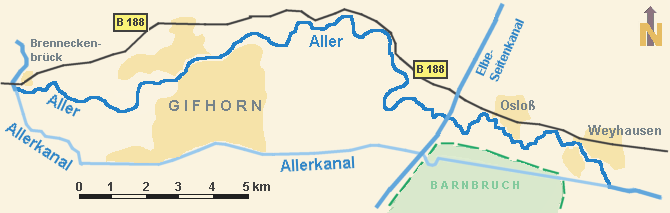
Course of the Aller Canal

The Aller Canal (German: Allerkanal) is a canal built in the mid-19th century in the German state of Lower Saxony. The canal is 18 kilometres (11 mi) long and runs between Wolfsburg and Gifhorn. It was built to protect agricultural land from flooding by the river Aller. The nearly straight canal carries water from the Aller more quickly than the river itself can in its meandering course through this section of the old glacial valley.

== Route ==
The Aller Canal was completed in 1863 after a three-year construction period. It begins near Weyhausen just beyond the city of Wolfsburg, where it is joined by the tributary of the Kleine Aller. Here the Aller divides itself between its natural river channel and the canal. The canal runs in an almost straight line through the wetland of the Barnbruch as far as Gifhorn where it passes the town to the south. West of Gifhorn the canal uses the upgraded and widened stream bed of the Hehlenriede and, 5 km west of Gifhorn, near Brenneckenbrück on the B 188, it rejoins the Aller. About a kilometre before that the water of the canal drops by about a metre over a weir. The river flows parallel to and north of the canal by several kilometres and, in this flat area of the Aller's old glacial valley, forms tightly-spaced meanders which reduce the water velocity in the river.

== Construction ==
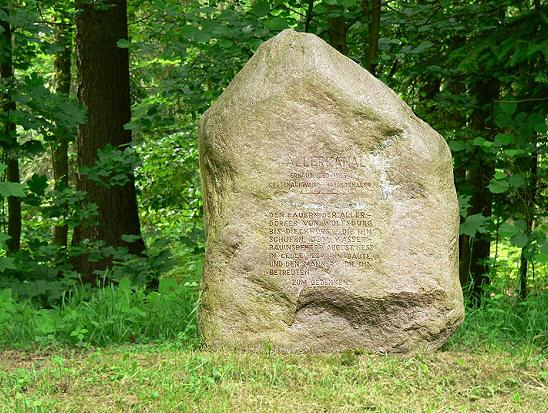
Monument to the construction of the canal

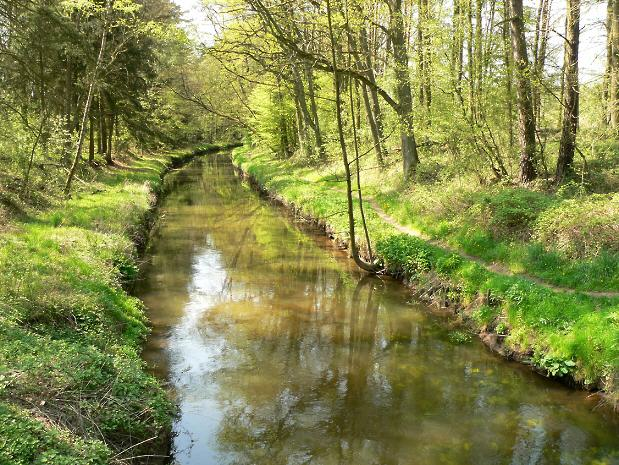
The Aller Canal in the Barnbruch wetland

The construction of the Aller Canal between 1860 and 1863 stemmed from a state treaty between Prussia, the Kingdom of Hanover and Duchy of Brunswick for the regulation of the Aller. Its purpose was to control the spring floods in the Aller valley and to assist in draining the former swampland of the Barnbruch. The canal is only about 5 m wide and 1 m deep. To appreciate the feat achieved by its builders it should be borne in mind that, at the time, there was almost no technical equipment and workers had to excavate the channel by hand using shovels.

A monument to the construction was erected by the canal between Brenneckenbrück and Gifhorn-Winkel. It carries the following inscription:

Allerkanal, erbaut 1860-63, Kostenaufwand 45.000 Thaler, den Bauern der Allerdörfer von Wolfsburg bis Diekhorst, die ihn schufen, dem Wasserbauinspektor August Hess in Celle, der ihn baute und den Männern, die ihn betreuten zum Gedenken

...which means: "To commemorate the Aller Canal, built 1860-63 at a cost of 45,000 thalers, and the farmers of the Aller villages from Wolfsburg to Diekhorst who created it, hydraulic engineer, August Hess, in Celle, who designed it, and the men he oversaw."

== Water quality ==
The Lower Saxon water quality report of 2004 assessed the chemical water contamination of the Aller Canal along with the river Aller itself as moderately polluted (water quality class II). Because the fascines that secured the banks have largely rotted away, the canal has become a near-natural waterway. The canal runs through the deciduous woods of the Barnbruch, which provides shade. This prevents the growth of weeds in the river bed, unlike the river Aller which is unshaded in most places.

== Tributaries ==
- Aller
- Hehlenriede
- Mühlenriede
- Rötgesbütteler Riede
- Vollbütteler Riede
