= Wipper =

Wipper can refer to:

- Wipper (Saale), a river in Saxony-Anhalt, Germany, originating in the Harz
- Wipper (Unstrut), a river in Thuringia, Germany
- Wipper, the name of the river Wupper in its upper course
- the German name for the river Wieprza in Poland
- Wippra Dam also known as the Wipper Dam
