= Barwedel =

- Municipality
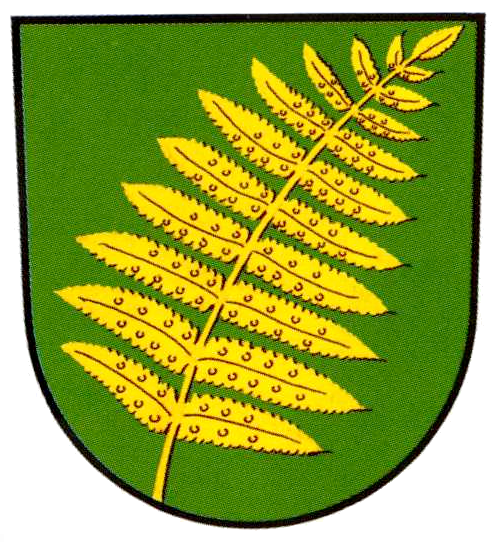
- Coat of arms

- Location of Barwedel within Gifhorn district
- Interactive map of Barwedel
- Location within Germany Location within Lower Saxony
- Coordinates: 52°31′N 10°47′E
- Country: Germany
- State: Lower Saxony
- District: Gifhorn
- Municipal assoc.: Boldecker Land

Area
  - Total: 19.8 km^{2} (7.6 sq mi)
- Elevation: 58 m (190 ft)

Population (2025-12-31)
  - Total: 985
  - Density: 49.7/km^{2} (129/sq mi)
- Time zone: UTC+01:00 (CET)
  - Summer (DST): UTC+02:00 (CEST)
- Postal codes: 38476
- Dialling codes: 05366
- Vehicle registration: GF

Barwedel is a municipality in the district of Gifhorn, in Lower Saxony, Germany.

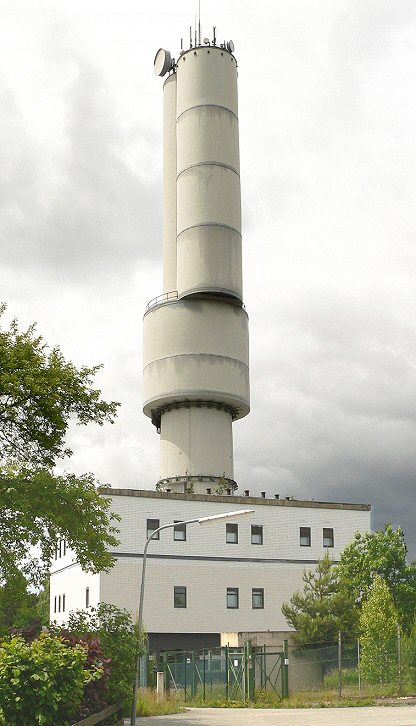
Tower
