= Grafhorst =

- Small city
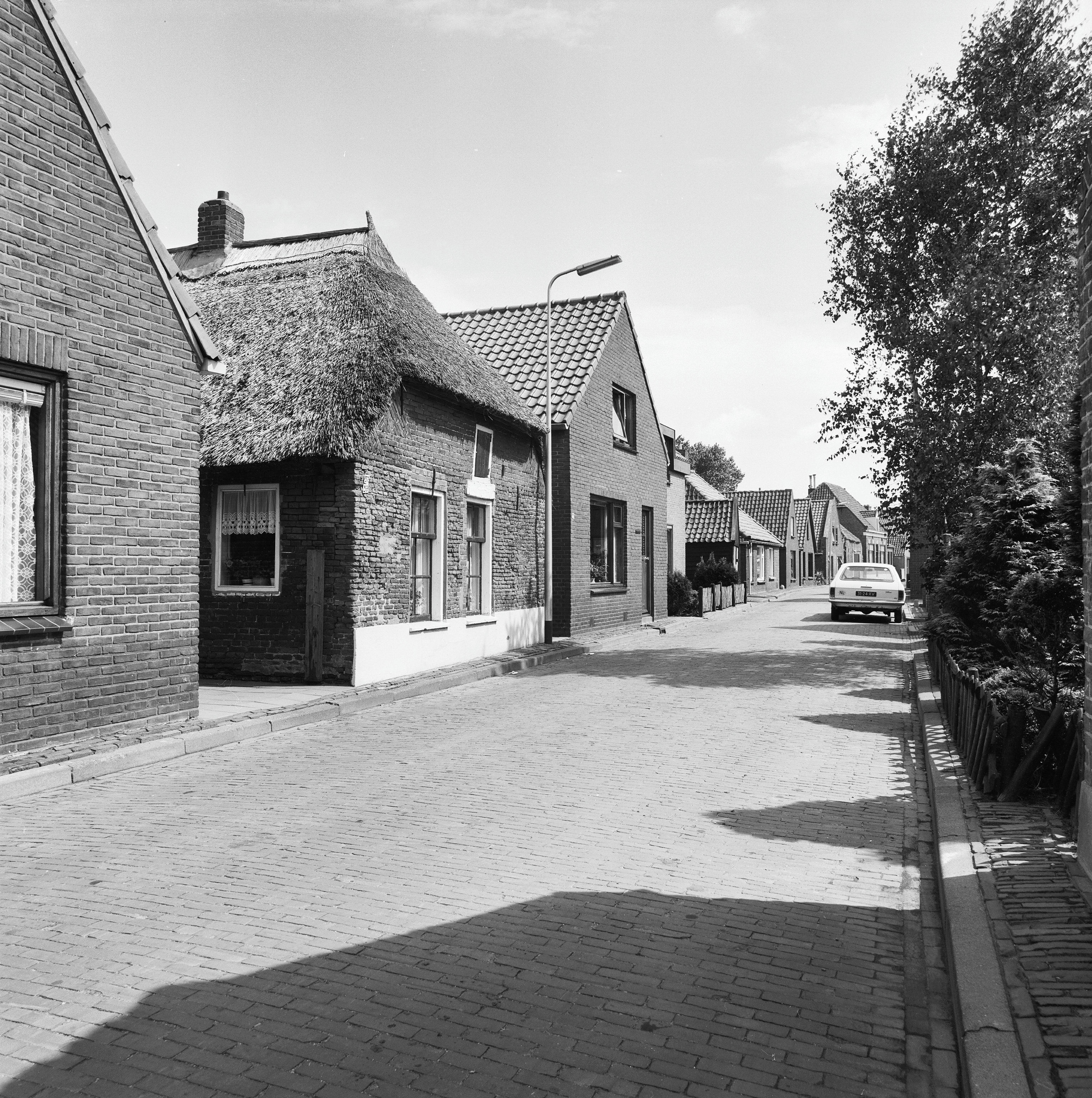
- Street view (1979)

- Coat of arms

- Location in the Netherlands Grafhorst (Netherlands)
- Coordinates: 52°34′57″N 5°56′2″E
- Country: Netherlands
- Province: Overijssel
- Municipality: Kampen

Area
  - Total: 1.57 km^{2} (0.61 sq mi)
- Elevation: 1 m (3.3 ft)

Population (2021)
  - Total: 1,030
  - Density: 656/km^{2} (1,700/sq mi)
- Time zone: UTC+1 (CET)
  - Summer (DST): UTC+2 (CEST)
- Postal code: 8277
- Dialing code: 0546

Grafhorst is a small city about 3 km north of Kampen, in the Dutch province of Overijssel. It received city rights in 1333 from Jan van Diest, the Prince-Bishop of Utrecht.

It was first mentioned in 1277 as Grafhorst, and means "burial height". Even though it was given city rights, it was never fortified and remained small. In 1775 and 1825, it was flooded. The economy used to be based in fishing with some agriculture culture. In 1849, it was home to 411 people. On 5 May 1849, nearly the entire city burnt down except for some farms and a couple of remote houses. In 1962, a church was built.

Grafhorst was a separate municipality until 1937, when it became a part of IJsselmuiden; it is now a part of Kampen.

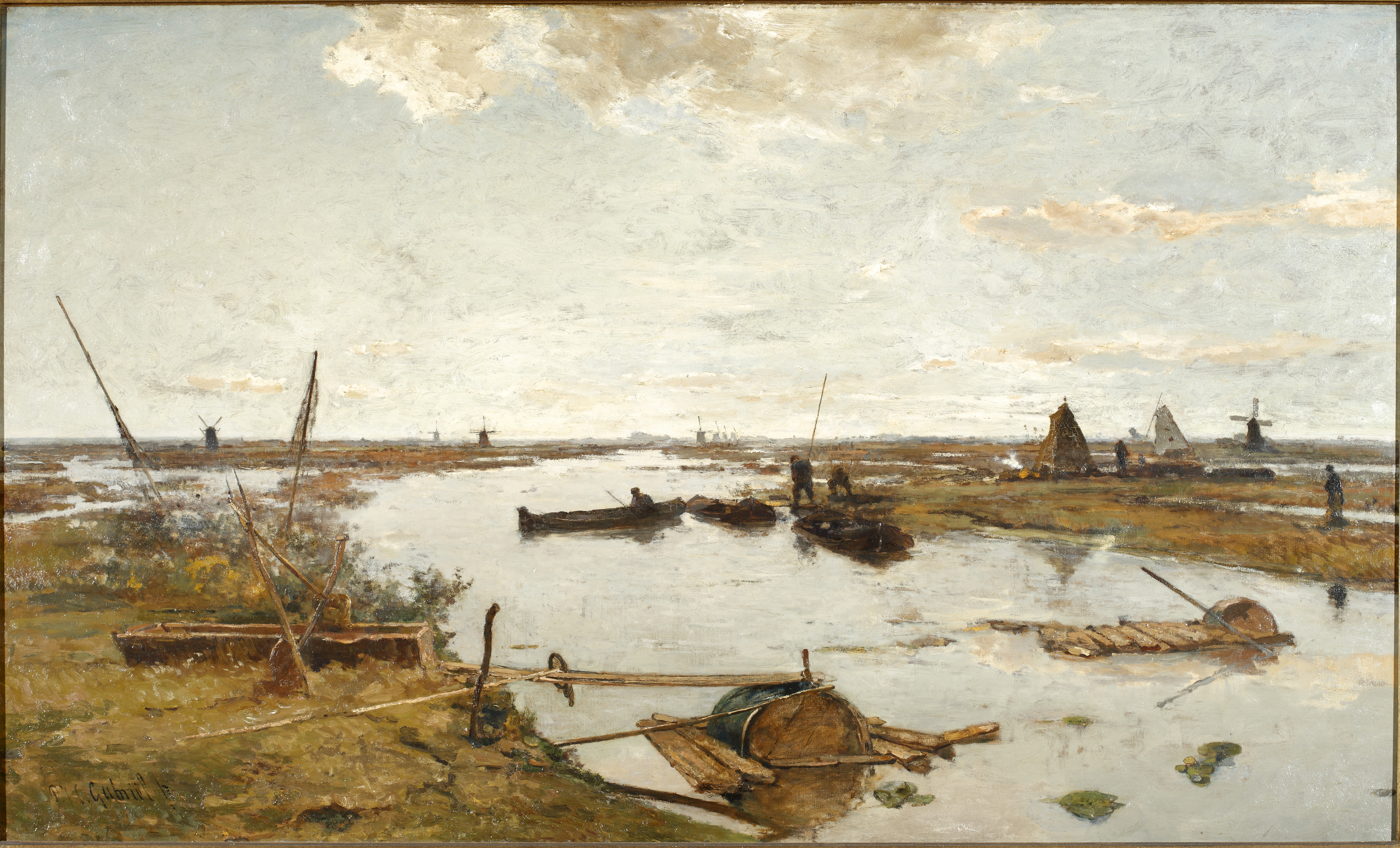
Peat excation at Kamperveenderij near Grafhorst
