= Osloß =

- Municipality
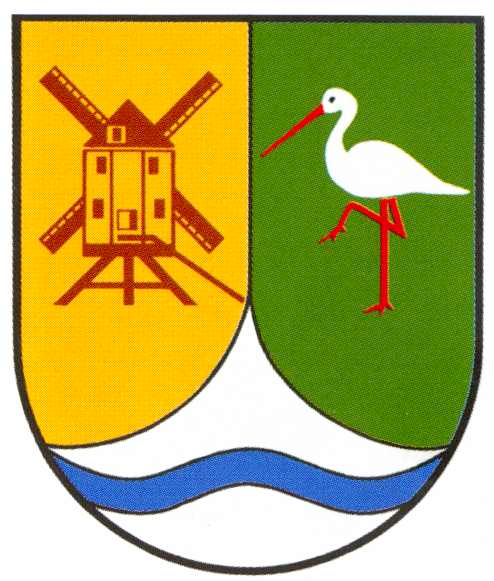
- Coat of arms

- Location of Osloß within Gifhorn district
- Interactive map of Osloß
- Location within Germany Location within Lower Saxony
- Coordinates: 52°28′N 10°41′E
- Country: Germany
- State: Lower Saxony
- District: Gifhorn
- Municipal assoc.: Boldecker Land

Government
  - Mayor: Rudi Matz (SPD)

Area
  - Total: 7.64 km^{2} (2.95 sq mi)
- Elevation: 52 m (171 ft)

Population (2025-12-31)
  - Total: 2,195
  - Density: 287/km^{2} (744/sq mi)
- Time zone: UTC+01:00 (CET)
  - Summer (DST): UTC+02:00 (CEST)
- Postal codes: 38557
- Dialling codes: 05362
- Vehicle registration: GF

Osloß is a municipality in the district of Gifhorn, in Lower Saxony, Germany.

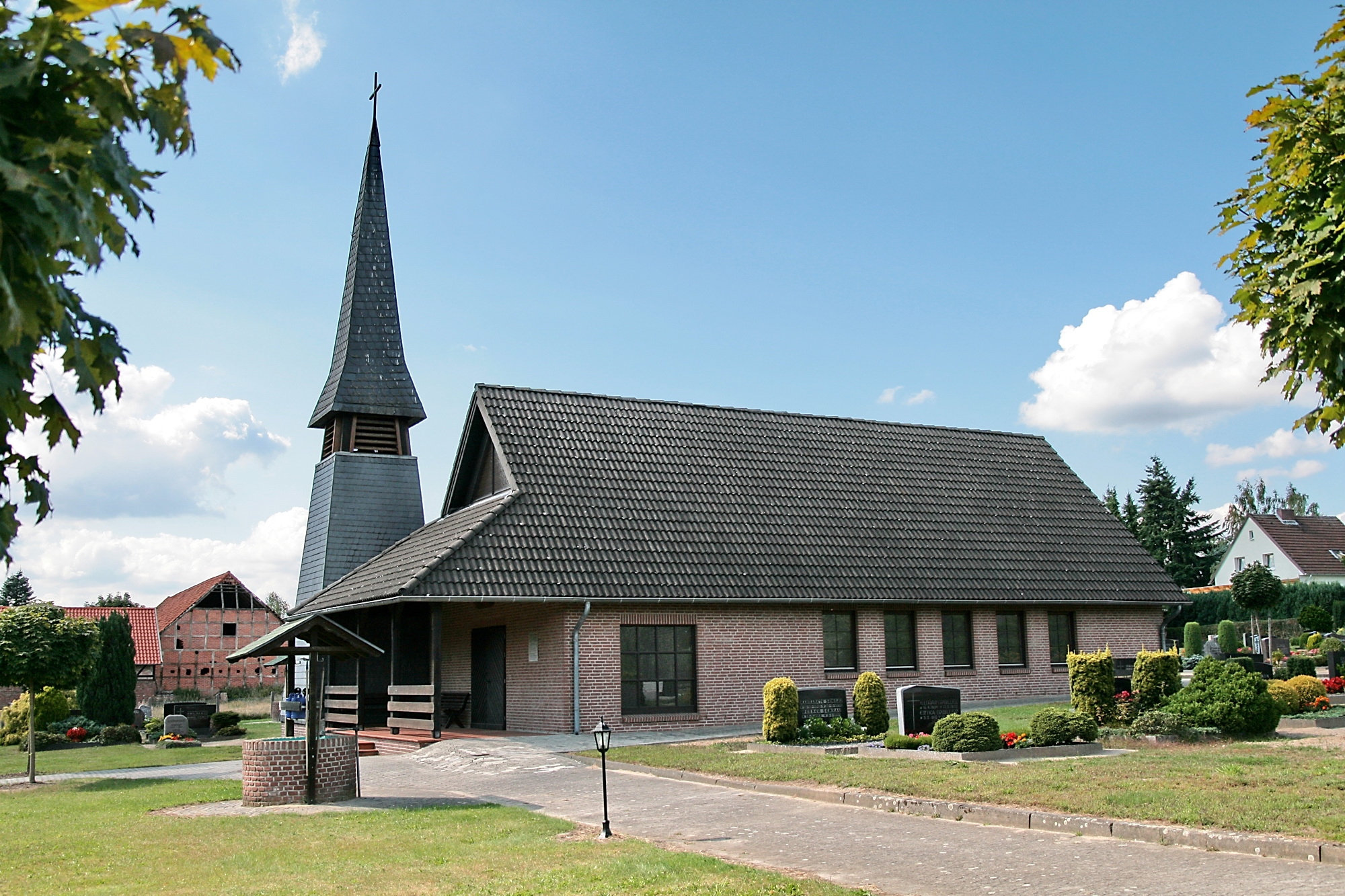
Cemetery chapel
