= Drömling =

Nature reserve in Saxony-Anhalt/Lower Saxony, Germany

Coordinates: 52°28′57″N 11°7′52″E

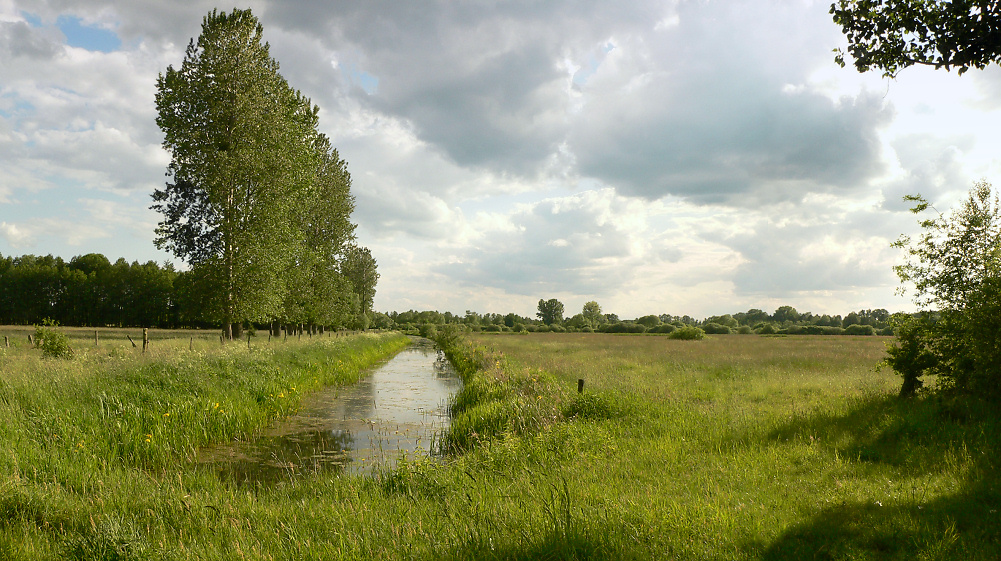
The landscape of Drömling

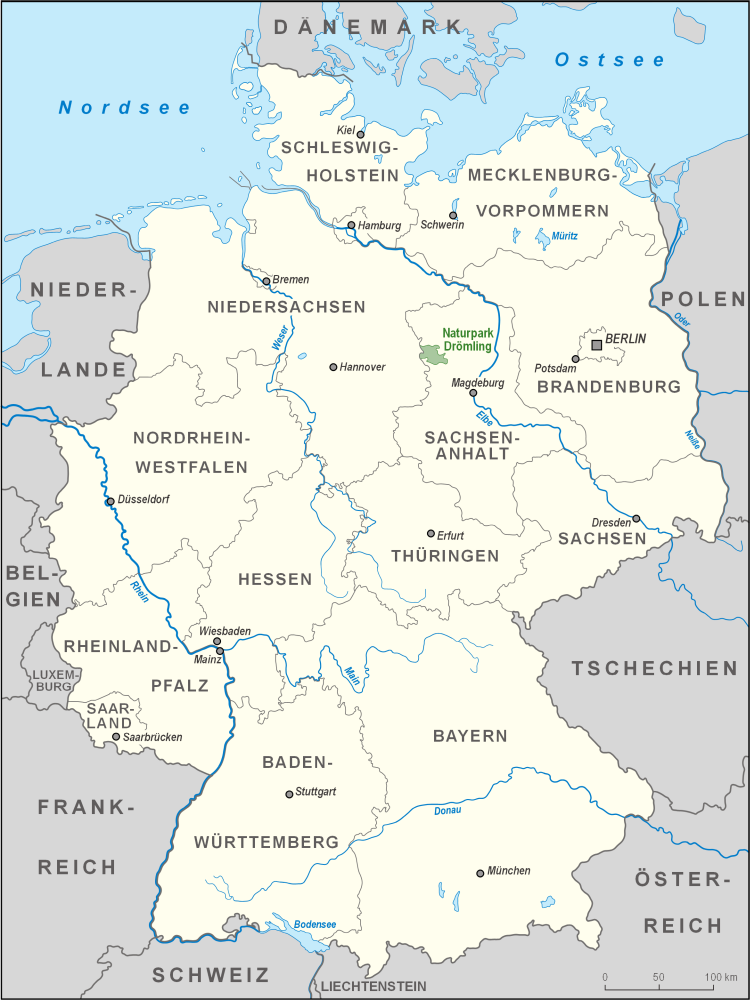
The location of the nature park in Germany

Drömling is a sparsely populated depression on the border of Lower Saxony and Saxony-Anhalt in Germany with an area of about 340 square kilometres (130 sq mi). The larger part belonging to Saxony-Anhalt in the east has been a nature park since 1990. The former swampland was transformed by drainage from a natural into a cultural landscape in the 18th century under the direction of Frederick the Great of Prussia. Today the depression, with its waterways, the Mittelland Canal and the rivers Aller and Ohre is a refuge for rare or endangered animal and plant species. Most of the area is now made up of nature reserves and protected areas. Nearby towns include Oebisfelde and Wolfsburg.

== Location ==
Drömling lies in a flat hollow measuring about 15 to 20 kilometres across and surrounding by a 60-metre contour. It is a wider section of the Breslau-Magdeburg-Bremen glacial valley. In broad terms, it stretches from Wolfsburg-Vorsfelde in the west to Calvörde in the east and from Klötze in the north to Oebisfelde in the south. To the west the geest ridges of the Vorsfelder Werder border on Drömling.

Drömling extends over the following districts: Salzwedel, Börde, Gifhorn, Wolfsburg and Helmstedt.

== See also ==
- List of nature parks in Germany

== Sources ==
- Heinz Frenkler: Der Drömling in Naturschutzgebiete im Raum Gifhorn-Wolfsburg, Großkopf-Verlag, Wolfsburg 1986, ISBN 3-929464-00-4
- Helmut Maigatter: Land der tausend Gräben – Aus der Geschichte des Drömlings. 2. Auflage 1997, gedruckt in Helmstedt, ohne ISBN
- Naturschutz im Land Sachsen-Anhalt, Sonderheft: Der Naturpark Drömling. Landesamt für Umweltschutz Sachsen-Anhalt, Abteilung Naturschutz, Halle 1993, ISSN 0940-6638
- Ernst Andreas Friedrich: Naturdenkmale Niedersachsens. Hanover 1980. ISBN 3-7842-0227-6
