= Weyhausen =

- Municipality
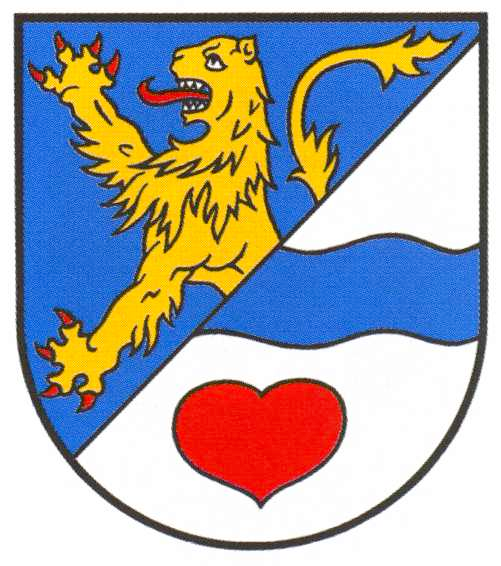
- Coat of arms

- Location of Weyhausen within Gifhorn district
- Interactive map of Weyhausen
- Location within Germany Location within Lower Saxony
- Coordinates: 52°28′N 10°43′E
- Country: Germany
- State: Lower Saxony
- District: Gifhorn
- Municipal assoc.: Boldecker Land

Government
  - Mayor: Hans-Georg Ranta

Area
  - Total: 7.98 km^{2} (3.08 sq mi)
- Elevation: 56 m (184 ft)

Population (2025-12-31)
  - Total: 2,798
  - Density: 351/km^{2} (908/sq mi)
- Time zone: UTC+01:00 (CET)
  - Summer (DST): UTC+02:00 (CEST)
- Postal codes: 38554
- Dialling codes: 05362
- Vehicle registration: GF
- Website: www.boldecker-land.de

Weyhausen is a municipality in the district of Gifhorn, in Lower Saxony, Germany.

== History ==
The earliest surviving record dates from 1344, naming the settlement as Weydehusen. In 1350 it was rebuilt following destruction by fire. The earliest known basis of the village was as a Wendish (Sorbian) cluster of log huts.

A directory in 1850 indicates that at that time Weyhausen contained 16 farmsteads.

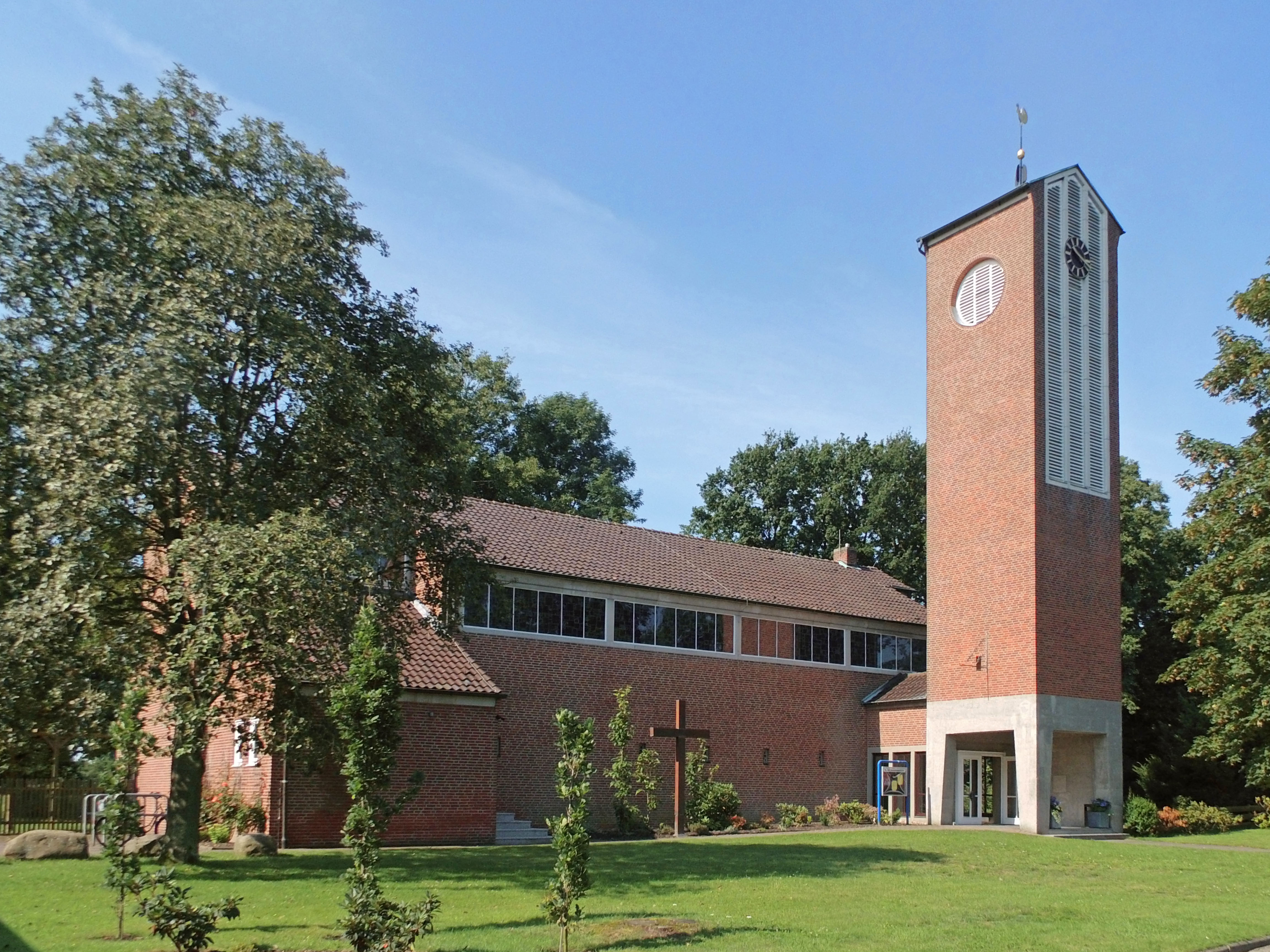
Lutheran church
