= Soltau-Lüneburg Training Area =

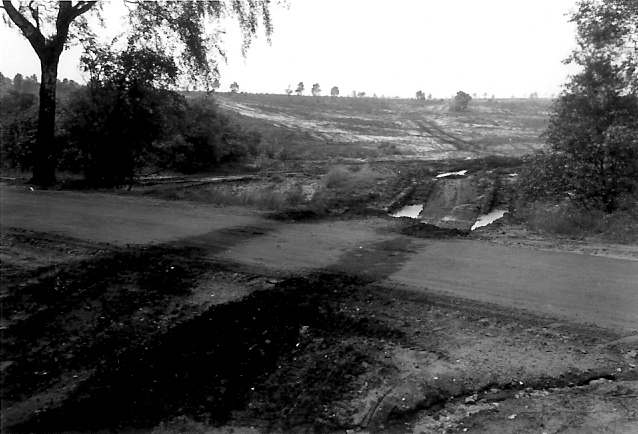
Tank tracks crossing a path near Wilsede in 1960

The Soltau-Lüneburg Training Area (SLTA) was a British and Canadian military training area in North Germany from 1963 to 1994. It was governed by the Soltau-Lüneburg Agreement (German: Soltau-Lüneburg-Abkommen, SLA) between the Federal Republic of Germany, the United Kingdom and Canada. The area was located in the Lüneburg Heath in the state of Lower Saxony and was used particularly by tanks and other armoured vehicles.

== History ==
In spite of the establishment of the Bergen Training Area in 1935 and the two training areas in Munster (1893 and 1916), the protected areas of the Lüneburg Heath Nature Reserve were initially out-of-bounds for military purposes. During the Second World War, however, German military installations were built here, including a Luftwaffe observation post on the Wilseder Berg, a satellite hospital for the city of Hamburg in Wintermoor and a military airfield near Reinsehlen.

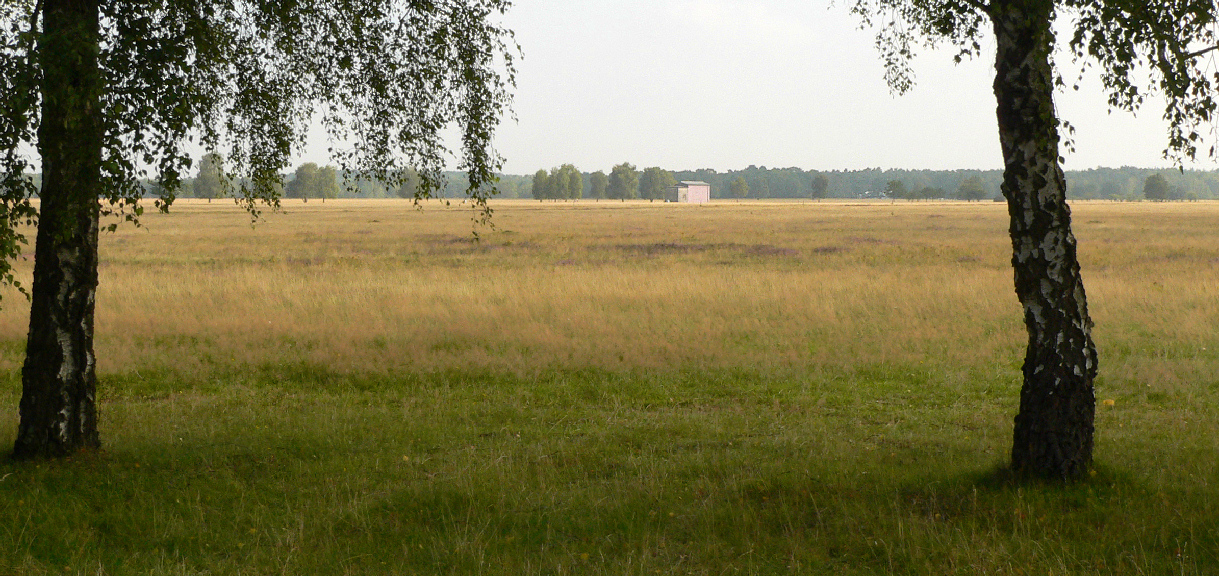
Reinsehlen Camp was used as a base for British armoured exercises in the Lüneburg Heath from 1950 to 1994. Today it is an important area of sandy calcareous grassland

After the Second World War, Canadian forces and units of the British Army of the Rhine conducted military exercises on the Lüneburg Heath from 1945 as part of their occupation rights. There was initially no defined training area. The site of the former German military airfield became Reinsehlen Camp and was used continuously by British armoured units from 1950. In the early years, the occupying forces continually extended their exercise area until they reached as far as the Wilseder Berg, but they pulled back again in the late 1940s. From 1948 they no longer exercised all year round, but restricted training to eight months of the year. The president of the Nature Reserve Society (Verein Naturschutzpark) or VNP, Alfred Toepfer, fought for the preservation of the reserves, but the British commander-in-chief only offered farmland and grassland areas that were desperately needed to feed the population.

In the wake of the integration of West Germany into the West, the country joined NATO in 1955, whereupon the occupation statute ceased to operate. The Paris Peace Treaties contained a new regulation for the presence of foreign troops in West Germany, which henceforth became known as "Sending States' Forces", stationed in Germany to help defend the country against possible invasion by the Soviet-controlled Warsaw Pact. In 1956 the Canadians largely stopped exercising in this area. That year the British withdrew from an area of 600 hectares near Haverbeck, after major protests by the locals.

== Agreement ==
On 3 August 1959 the Federal Republic of Germany, Canada and the United Kingdom signed a special agreement in Bonn permitting exercises in the area of Soltau-Lüneburg in order to be able to train to defend Germany in the event of attack during the Cold War. The agreement was included in Article 19 of the NATO Status of Forces Agreement (SOFA). Due to its protracted ratification, the law was not published in the statute book until 1961 and it went into force on 1 July 1963 as the Soltau-Lüneburg Agreement (Soltau-Lüneburg-Abkommen). In 1965 a Standing Committee for the Soltau-Lüneburg Agreement (Ständiger Ausschuss für das Soltau-Lüneburg-Abkommen) was formed. It handled complaints, strove to balance the interests of different parties and coordinated civilian and military issues.

The agreement permitted stationed troops to conduct exercises all-year-round within the specified area. Villages and farmsteads were not to be used as military objectives and armoured vehicles could not move on Sundays or public holidays.

== Location ==
The Soltau-Lüneburg Agreement designated an area, 40 km long and 10 km wide, between the towns of Soltau and Lüneburg, with an area of about 34,500 hectares, in which some 26,000 people lived. The federal government rented about 12% of the area, of which the stationed forces were given about 4,600 hectares as red areas (Rote Flächen) for their continuous and unrestricted use. 3,700 hectares of red area belonged to the present-day county of Heidekreis, the remaining 900 ha to the county of Lüneburg. Before the agreement the military had been using 48,000 hectares for training purposes. The red areas were set aside purely for the stationed troops, the Bundeswehr were not permitted to exercise on them.

== Impact ==
Around 1,800 landowners were required, under the agreement, to make their property available for military purposes. With over 1,600 hectares, the Nature Reserve Society was one of the landowners affected and they refused to accept the Soltau-Lüneburg Agreement from the outset, although their opposition came to nothing. Another 1,600 hectares belonged to private landowners. In 1970, several landowners were allowed to return their estates to agricultural use. In the mid-1970s, the VNP unsuccessfully sued, citing the unconstitutionality of the agreement before the county court in Lüneburg.

As a result of armoured vehicle training, the heathland of the red areas increasingly resembled a desert. The areas were not, however, placed out-of-bounds like a normal military training area and the public could enter them. In a few cases there were accidents as a result of visitors tampering with training munitions. No live firing was permitted in the area, however.

During the 1970s, an average of 1,500 armoured vehicles and 30,000 soldiers exercised in the training area each year under the terms of the agreement. As a result, traffic on the local roads was heavy due to troop movements and there was an increased risk of accidents. The local population had to put up with noise, dust and vibration. In addition, the harvests were sometimes affected and roads damaged by the movement of heavy military loads. However, significant compensation for the damage caused was regularly paid by both the British and German governments in accordance with the SOFA.

== Protests ==
In Schneverdingen a citizen's initiative was begun in 1986 to reduce the military impact in the Lüneburg Heath. They gathered 13,000 signatures demanding the end of the Soltau-Lüneburg Agreement. Its members organised many protests. In 1988 they collected around 100 oil drums from the red areas and protested to the Lower Saxon parliament in Hanover. In 1990 they obstructed the railway ramp at Reinsehlen Camp to prevent the off-loading of tanks. In 1991, the blockade of an underpass near the camp was set up to prevent tanks entering the heath. In another citizen's initiative was started in Amelinghausen in 1988 to reduce military exercises. In 1992, both movements, together with other environmental organisations, demanded that the minister president of Lower Saxony, Gerhard Schröder, put an end to the exercises and the agreement.

== End of the Agreement ==
In 1989, at the end of the Cold War, the Soltau-Lüneburg Agreement was renegotiated by defence ministers, Gerhard Stoltenberg, and Tom King, in order to reduce the impact of exercises on the local population. In 1990, a break in training of several weeks was agreed during the time when the heath was in bloom during the peak tourist period of August and September. In addition no tanks were permitted to use the red areas on Sundays and public holidays. Villages were given a 400 metre wide buffer zone from armoured exercises and tanks were not permitted to drive through them at night.

After German reunification, the two defence ministers, Stoltenberg and King, reached an agreement on 17 October 1991 for the cessation of training in the heath. On 31 July 1994 the Soltau-Lüneburg Agreement ran out and the last red areas were returned to the VNP. They have subsequently restored the areas with the assistance of the Federation.

== Literature ==
- Reports by the NNA: Einer trage des Anderen Last - 12.782 Tage Soltau-Lüneburg-Abkommen, 4th year/1993, special issue
