= Lindwedel =

- Municipality
- Coat of arms

- Location of Lindwedel within Heidekreis district
- Interactive map of Lindwedel
- Location within Germany Location within Lower Saxony
- Coordinates: 52°37′N 9°41′E
- Country: Germany
- State: Lower Saxony
- District: Heidekreis
- Municipal assoc.: Schwarmstedt
- Subdivisions: 2 Ortschaften

Government
  - Mayor: Arthur Minke (CDU)

Area
  - Total: 16.56 km^{2} (6.39 sq mi)
- Elevation: 34 m (112 ft)

Population (2025-12-31)
  - Total: 2,729
  - Density: 164.8/km^{2} (426.8/sq mi)
- Time zone: UTC+01:00 (CET)
  - Summer (DST): UTC+02:00 (CEST)
- Postal codes: 29690
- Dialling codes: 05073 u. 05130
- Vehicle registration: HK, FAL, SFA
- Website: www.lindwedel.org

Lindwedel is a municipality in the administrative division of Schwarmstedt, in the Heidekreis region of Lower Saxony, Germany.

There is evidence of settlement in the area for several millennia. The first mention of Lindwedel is in the year 1304.

The municipality comprises the villages of Lindwedel and Hope.

Neighboring municipalities are Vesbeck, Oegenbostel, Plumhof, Berkhof, Sprockhof, Buchholz (Aller), Grindau and Esperke.
