= Lüneburg Heath Nature Reserve =

Nature reserve in Germany

Coordinates: 53°10′06.94″N 9°56′22.97″E

- Naturschutzgebiet Lüneburger Heide
- IUCN category IV (habitat/species management area)
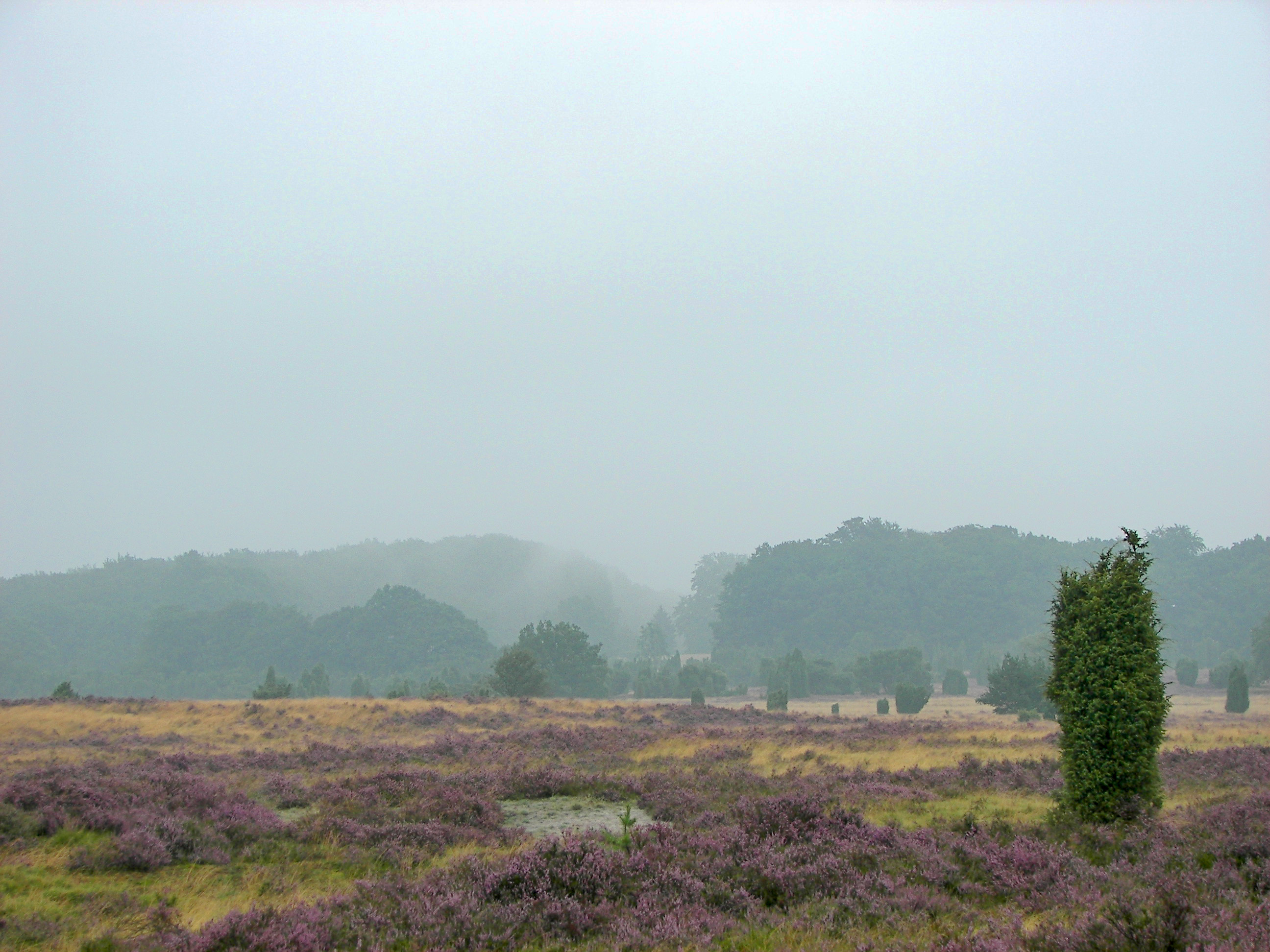
- Heathland in the reserve near Niederhaverbeck
- Location: Lower Saxony
- Area: 23.1475 ha (57.199 acres)
- Designation: NSG LÜ 002
- Established: 1921/2
- Administrator: NLWKN

The Lüneburg Heath Nature Reserve (German: Naturschutzgebiet Lüneburger Heide) is one of the oldest and largest nature reserves (Naturschutzgebiete or NSGs) in Germany, and the oldest and largest in Lower Saxony. It was first established on 29 December 1921 when an area of four square miles was declared a nature park by the Prussian government.

== Description of the area ==
The boundaries of the Lüneburg Heath Nature Reserve are identical with those of the Lüneburg Heath Nature Park. It lies in the northern part of the region known as the Lüneburg Heath. It is bordered to the north by Hanstedt, to the east by Egestorf, to the south by Bispingen and to the west by Schneverdingen. At the centre of the reserve is the Wilseder Berg, at 169.2 metres (555 ft) above NN the highest point on the north German plain, formed from a ridge of end moraine by the glaciers of the ice age.

Around 1900, the vast tracts of heathland were planted with forest or ploughed up for agriculture. In 1921, 21,000 hectares of the remaining heath was declared a nature reserve (the rules came into force in January 1922). In 1993 this protected area was expanded to 23,440 hectares. By the beginning of 2007 the area of the nature reserve had become identical with that of the Lüneburg Heath Nature Park. However, the latter was then further expanded on 14 February 2007 to more than 1077 square kilometres. The districts of Heidekreis and Harburg are responsible for the area in their role as subordinate nature conservation authorities.

== Flora and fauna ==
The nature reserve comprises 60% woods, 26% heath, 8,5% cultivated land, 3% pasture, 2% marsh and 1,5% settlements, lakes, etc. There are about 5,100 hectares of dry sandy heath, the largest remaining, contiguous, inland heath of its type (a Zwergstrauchheide) in central Europe. The reserve also has extensive coniferous forests, predominantly of pine trees. These date back to the reforestation of the heathland in the 19th century. There are also small stands of older deciduous trees: oaks and beech. The high proportion of woods makes the Lüneburg Heath Nature Reserve one of the largest areas of protected woodland in Germany. In addition there are streams and small valleys, marshes, meadows, pastures, fields and open sands.

The region is extremely important for the protection of biotopes and plant and animal species. It is the only freely accessible part of Lower Saxony in which the Black Grouse may be found. The results of the grouse censuses have been able to show an encouraging improvement in recent years.

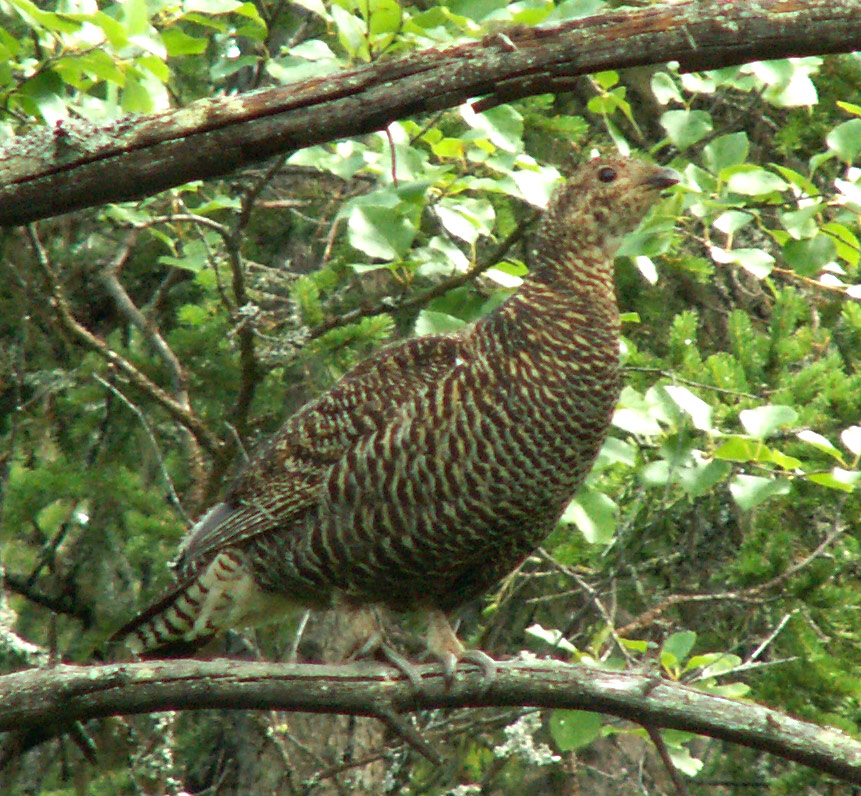
Black Grouse (Lyrurus tetrix o. Tetrao tetrix)

=== Population of Black Grouse ===
Year	Cocks	Hens	Total	Year	Cocks	Hens	Total
1978	21	12	33	1993	15	16	31
1979				1994	12	16	28
1980	14	7	21	1995	13	12	25
1981	12	4	16	1996	11	17	28
1982	11	9	20	1997	9	18	27
1983	14	10	24	1998	8	15	23
1984	15	6	21	1999	11	14	25
1985	6	7	13	2000	14	15	29
1986	14	10	24	2001	17	18	35
1987	23	19	42	2002	20	19	39
1988	27	22	49	2003	16	19	35
1989	28	19	47	2004	28	24	52
1990	27	19	46	2005	33	26	59
1991	24	17	41	2006	40	25	65
1992	16	15	31	2007	45	33	78

== Places of interest in the nature reserve ==
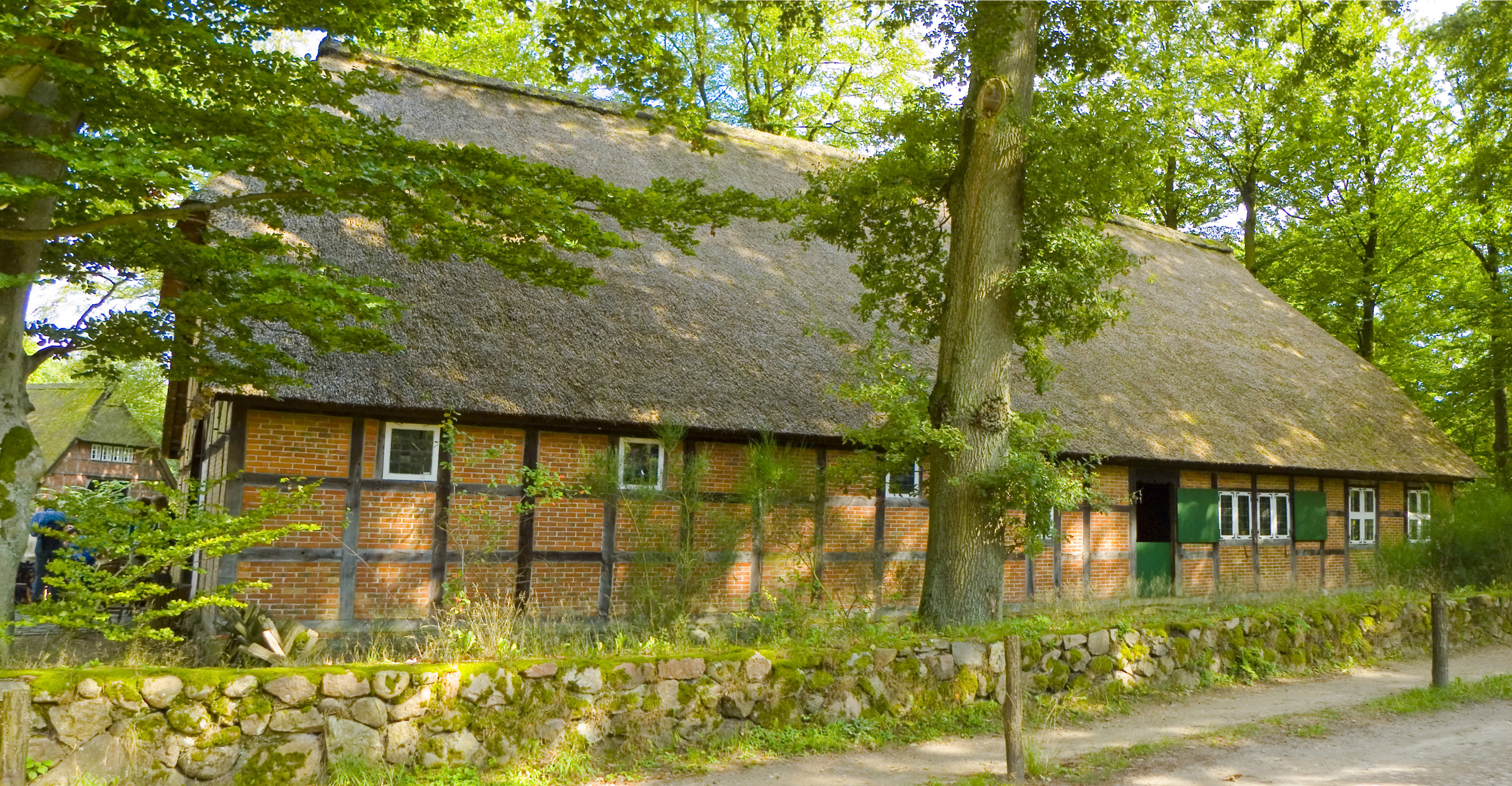
The Heath Museum Dat ole Huus in Wilsede

Wilsede has one of the oldest open air museums in Germany: the Heath Museum (Heidemuseum) opened in 1907 in a historic building that had been transferred there and known as Dat ole Huus ("the ole house"). Inside the house you can see how the heath folk, the Heidjer, lived and worked around 1900. Other places of interest include the Emhof in Wilsede, the Totengrund part of the heath, the old heathland churches in Egestorf and Undeloh, the nature information centres in Döhle, Niederhaverbeck and Undeloh and the Pietzmoor marsh near Schneverdingen. Also to be found within the nature reserve are Bronze Age tumuli, historic paths and boundary markers, walls of stones deposited by glaciers, old sheep pens and barns with outside steps known as Treppenspeicher.

Local moorland sheep - the Heidschnucken - are grazed on the heath in order to maintain it. This method is supplemented by mechanical measures such as mowing, or the cutting of turves, a method known as Plaggen, and the controlled use of burning during the winter months. These measures ensure the necessary rejuvenation of the heather. The incursion of pine trees has to be held at bay by regular cutting back (Entkusselung). With the exception of the two roads crossing the area, there is a general ban on motorised vehicles in order to protect the terrain as well as animal and plant life.

== Pioneers ==
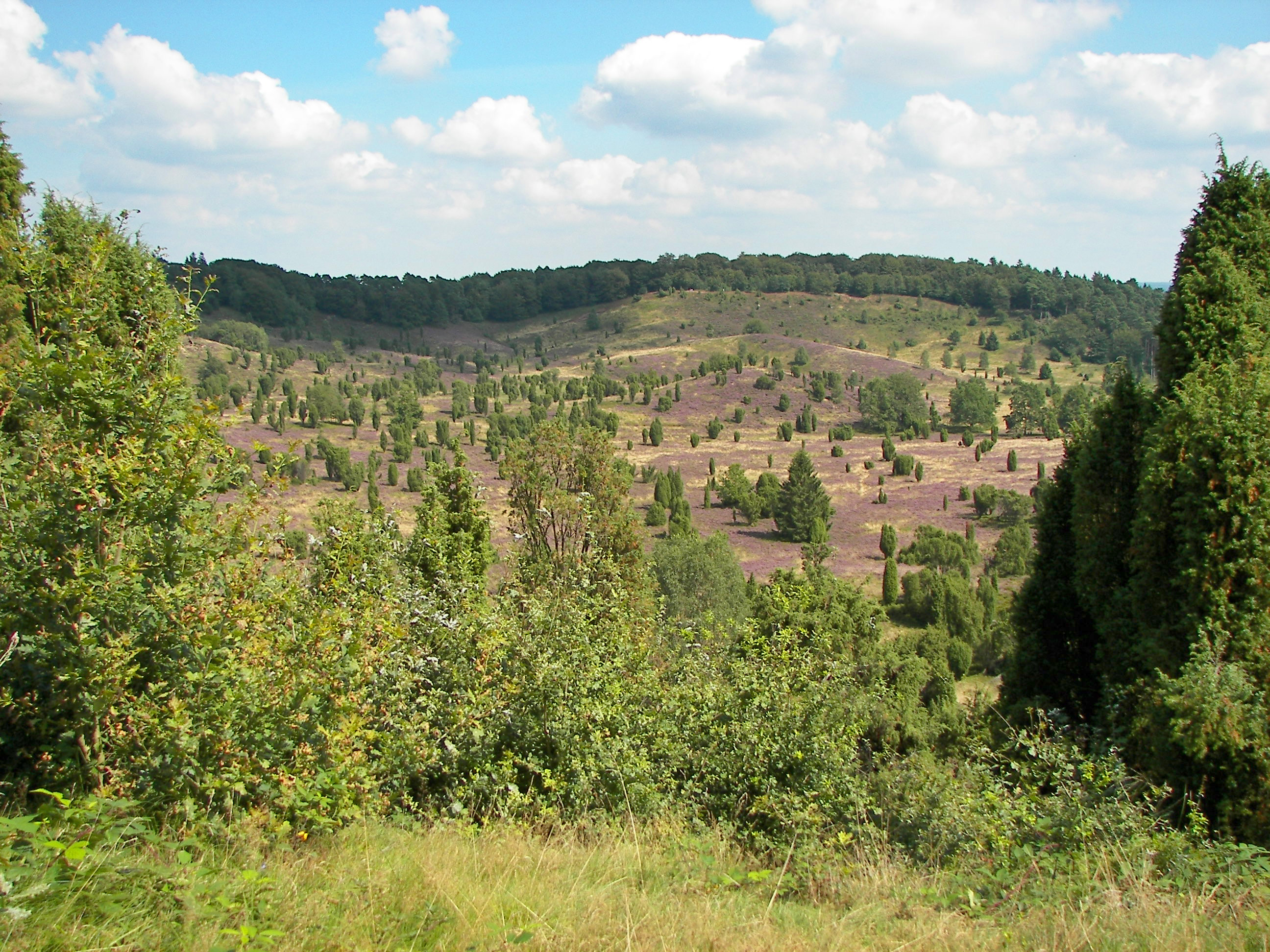
The Totengrund area of the heath near Wilsede

In 1905, an Egestorf pastor, Wilhelm Bode (20 October 1860 - 10 June 1927), bought an area of heathland, the so-called Totengrund. This was aided by a donation of 6,000 gold marks from Andreas Thomsen, a professor from Münster. In 1909 Bode founded the Nature Park Association (Verein Naturschutzpark or VNP) in Munich. This set itself the aim of protecting large areas of land and was based on the American National Park concept. It wanted to preserve the heathland at the centre of the present-day Lüneburg Heath Nature Park from development, afforestation or upheaval through agriculture. In 1910 it purchased the Wilseder Berg. Today the association owns more than 8,200 hectares (20,000 acres) of the Lüneburg Heath, and another 1,100 hectares (2,700 acres) have been rented long-term.

In January 1954 the Hamburg tradesman, Alfred Toepfer (1894–1993) became president of the association. He had been a member since 1927. Thanks to Toepfer's good connections in politics, the economy and foreign conservation organisations important steps could be taken. In order to honour its founding father, Alfred Toepfer, the former North German Conservation Academy (Norddeutsche Naturschutzakademie) was renamed the Alfred Toepfer Academy of Conservation in 1995.

== Military training ==
One particular issue was the military training area in the southwestern half of the nature reserve which was under constant and heavy use. From November 1950, British and Canadian troops used Reinsehlen Camp near Schneverdingen as a base camp for armoured exercises in the Red Areas of the Soltau-Lüneburg Training Area, so-called from their red shading on the training area maps. The Soltau-Lüneburg Agreement was signed in 1959 between the Federal Republic of Germany, the United Kingdom and Canada and fixed the boundaries of the armoured training area. West of the Behringen-Wintermoor road, the effects of heavy use by allied tracked vehicles could be seen. Proposals by the Nature Reserve Association to move the armoured exercises to the neighbouring 10,000 hectare large Munster North Training Area were rejected. Canadian forces stopped using the training area fairly early on, but British Forces continued to exercise there until 1994.
