= Reinsehlen Camp =

Open area in Lower Saxony, Germany

Coordinates: 53.150°N 9.823°E

Reinsehlen Camp (German: Camp Reinsehlen) is a largely treeless area of around 100 hectares (250 acres) close to the village of Reinsehlen near the town of Schneverdingen in Lower Saxony, Germany. It is known for its calcareous grassland and most of the area is now a nature reserve. In the past, the area served as a military airfield, a Displaced Persons camp and a military training area. From 1950 to 1994 the Canadian and British armed forces used the area as base camp for extensive tank exercises in the Lüneburg Heath — thus the name "Camp".

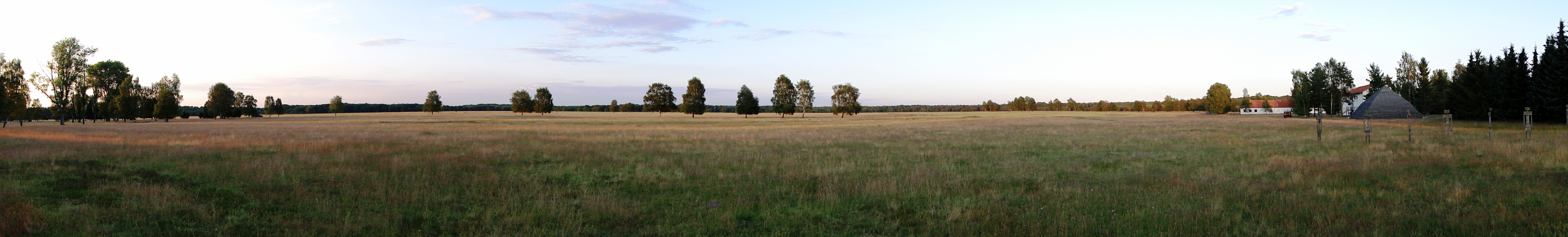
Panorama view of Reinsehlen Camp with the Bent Pyramid and Slat Humans, the former garrison headquarters and the nature academy on the right

== Ecology ==
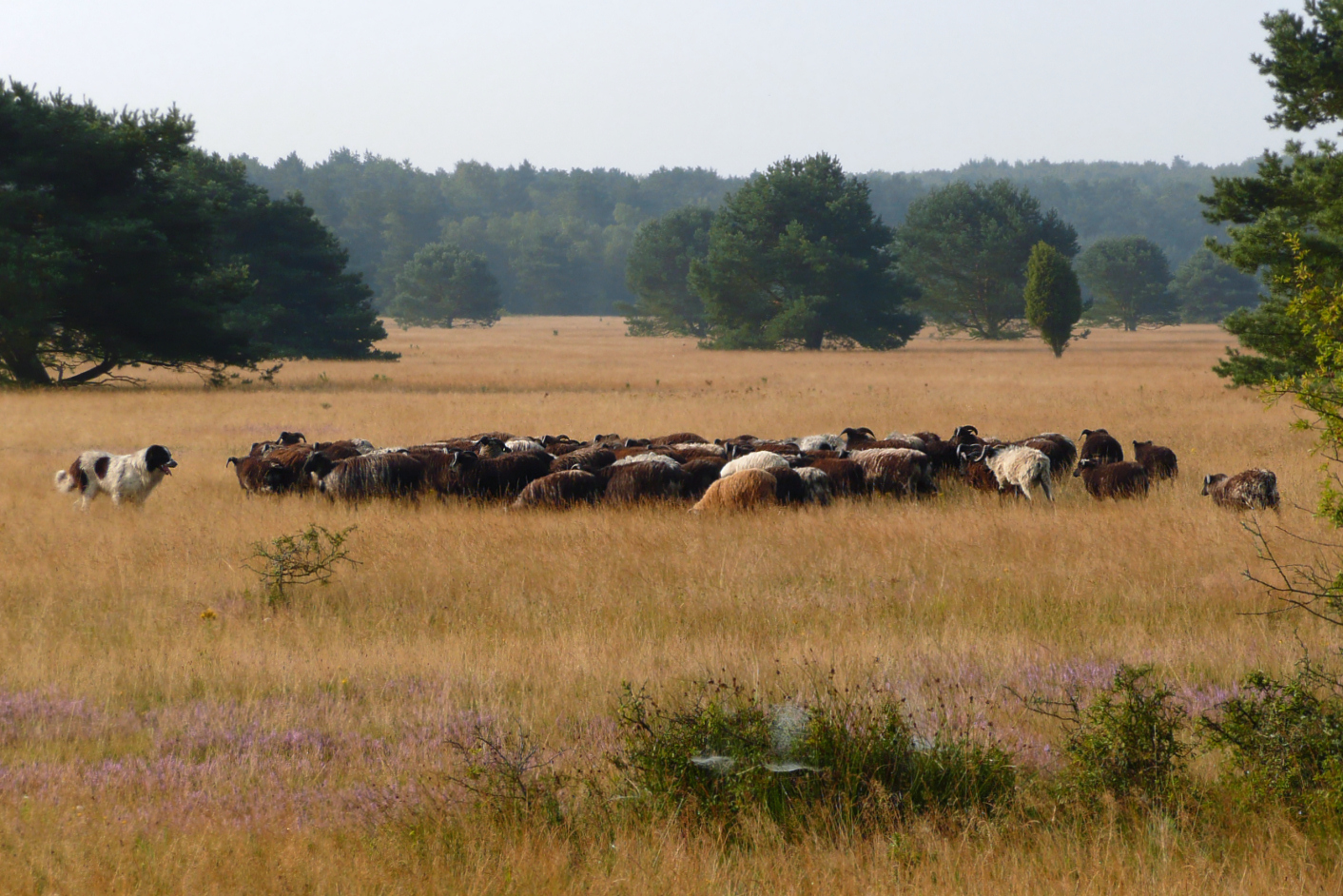
Heidschnucken on the open grassland.

The area's dry and nutrient-poor sandy soil provides a habitat for numerous endangered plants such as the sea thrift, childing pink and wild thyme. The dominant species is sheep fescue. Other rare plants include filago and the hairgrass Corynephorus canescens. The grassland provides nesting for various birds, among them the woodlark, the skylark and the titlark. Leaving the paths is prohibited during the nesting season from April to July, dogs must be kept on a short leash. A herd of Heidschnucken sheep keeps the grass short.

In 1995, the Lower Saxony Landesamt für Ökologie classified the area as worthy of priority protection. It is the largest calcareous grassland in all of Lower Saxony or even northern Germany. The open grassland area is deemed one of the 'natural wonders' of the Lüneburg Heath Nature Reserve.

Aside from those areas put to new uses — see section Today below — various parts of the former DP camp are now private property with some tracts of land used for farming. Woodlands have increased in size since the military departed in the mid-1990s.

== History ==
=== Military airfield (1938-45) ===
==== Establishment ====
After the Nazis came to power in 1933 they soon initiated a policy of re-armament and this involved creating new military facilities. The Lüneburg Heath was of interest to the military due to its low population density and relatively unproductive soil. The Wehrmacht thus established numerous outposts in the region or expanded existing ones. Among those were large-scale training areas. Other installations later became POW camps in the war. One eventually turned into Bergen-Belsen concentration camp. In 1938, the Deutsche Luftwaffe claimed a sizeable area near Reinsehlen to establish a military airfield.

The designated airfield measured roughly 250 hectares. Farmers were expropriated without compensation, but those who owned herds of Heidschnucken were allowed to leave them to graze on the grasslands of the airfield. The area originally was slightly hilly and sandy, partially covered by heath as well as oak and birch trees. There was a basin containing the source of the Fintau stream in the middle of the area. Construction started by leveling and deep ploughing the land. As the sandy soil with a layer of hardpan was too infertile for the desired grass-covered airfield, plenty of peat and dung was used as fertilizer.

The airfield was connected to roads, among them the Reichsstrasse 3 (today B3). A concrete ring road surrounded the area. Wooden huts were erected on the airfield, housing air traffic control, crew quarters, a mess hall and a military hospital. For camouflage, the buildings were covered by peaked roofs under mats of reeds. There was even a fake church steeple. Hostile air reconnaissance was supposed to see a simple Heidedorf (heath village). Ammunition bunkers, hangars, repair shops and subterranean fuel tanks were constructed. The largest building was the KdF-Hall of around 840 square metres, which served as cinema and multipurpose hall. Construction materials and supplies for the airfield arrived via a loading station connected to the nearby Heidebahn. An extension linked the airfield's ammunition bunkers to the Heidebahn.

==== Operations ====
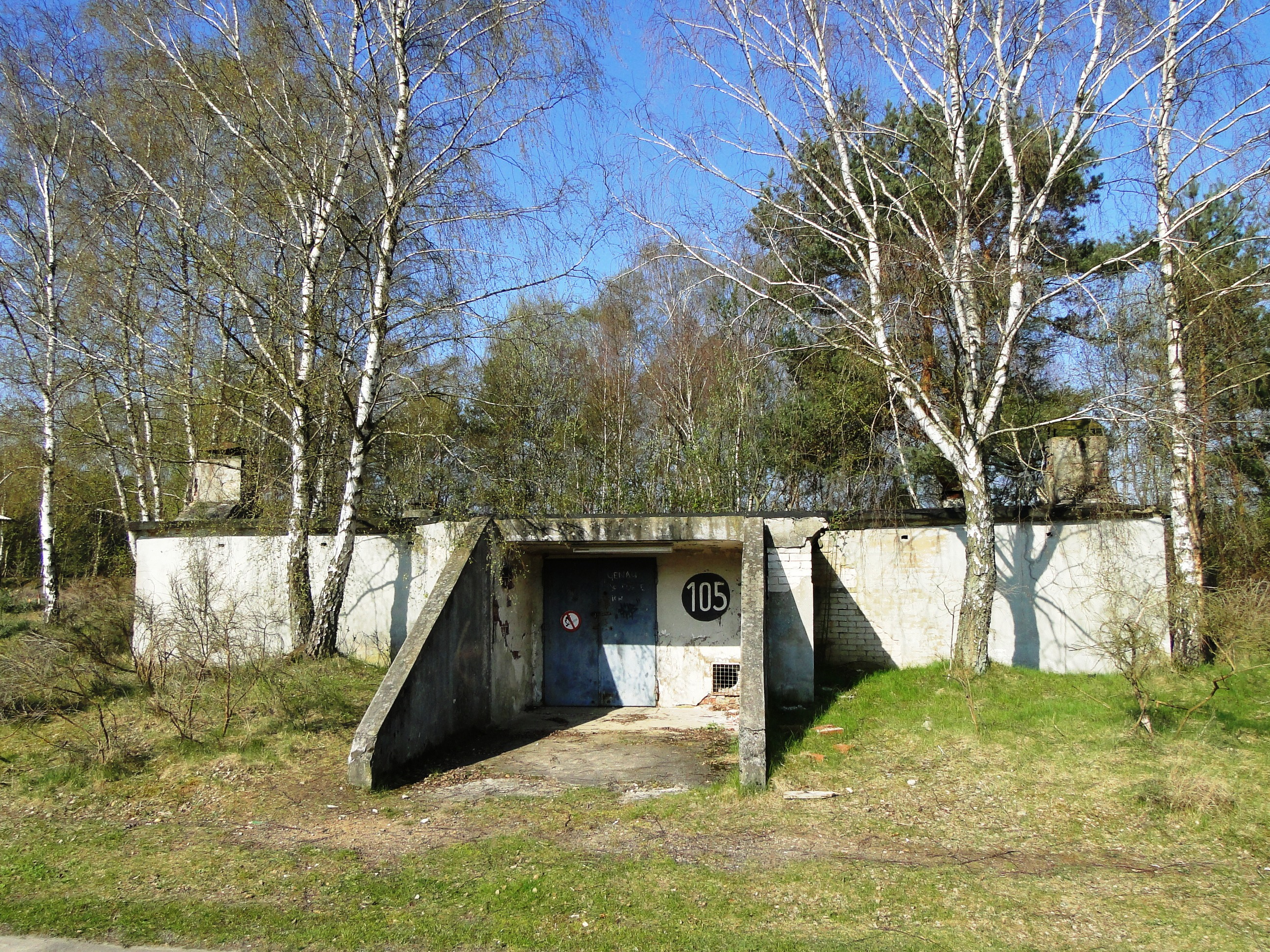
Second to last remaining ammunition bunker in 2012, since demolished.

The airfield was used for both training and operations. Its codename for radio communication was Posemuckel. The first plane landed on 13 September 1939, shortly after World War II had started with the German invasion of Poland. During the war, the Luftwaffe set up several anti-aircraft gun and searchlight emplacements around the perimeter.

Various units of the Luftwaffe used the Reinsehlen airfield for training and to test new equipment. Plane types flying from Reinsehlen included bombers like the Heinkel He 111, transport planes like the Ju 52 which pulled gliders of type Gotha and fighters like the Focke-Wulf Fw 190. After the air war moved to Germany, Messerschmitt Bf 110 were stationed at the airfield. Training involved inter alia bombing runs in which bombs made of concrete were dropped onto heath surfaces east of the railway line. Among those housed on the airfield were forced labourers from Eastern Europe as well as Soviet and Polish POWs. Their labour was used to expand the facilities including road construction in and around the military area. Eventually the military area stretched all the way to the Höpen (a hill) in the southwest, extended beyond the Reichsstrasse 3 in the east and was supposed to be bounded by a new ring road going north from Schneverdingen towards Wintermoor in the west and the Wintermoorer Strasse in the north.

==== End of the war ====
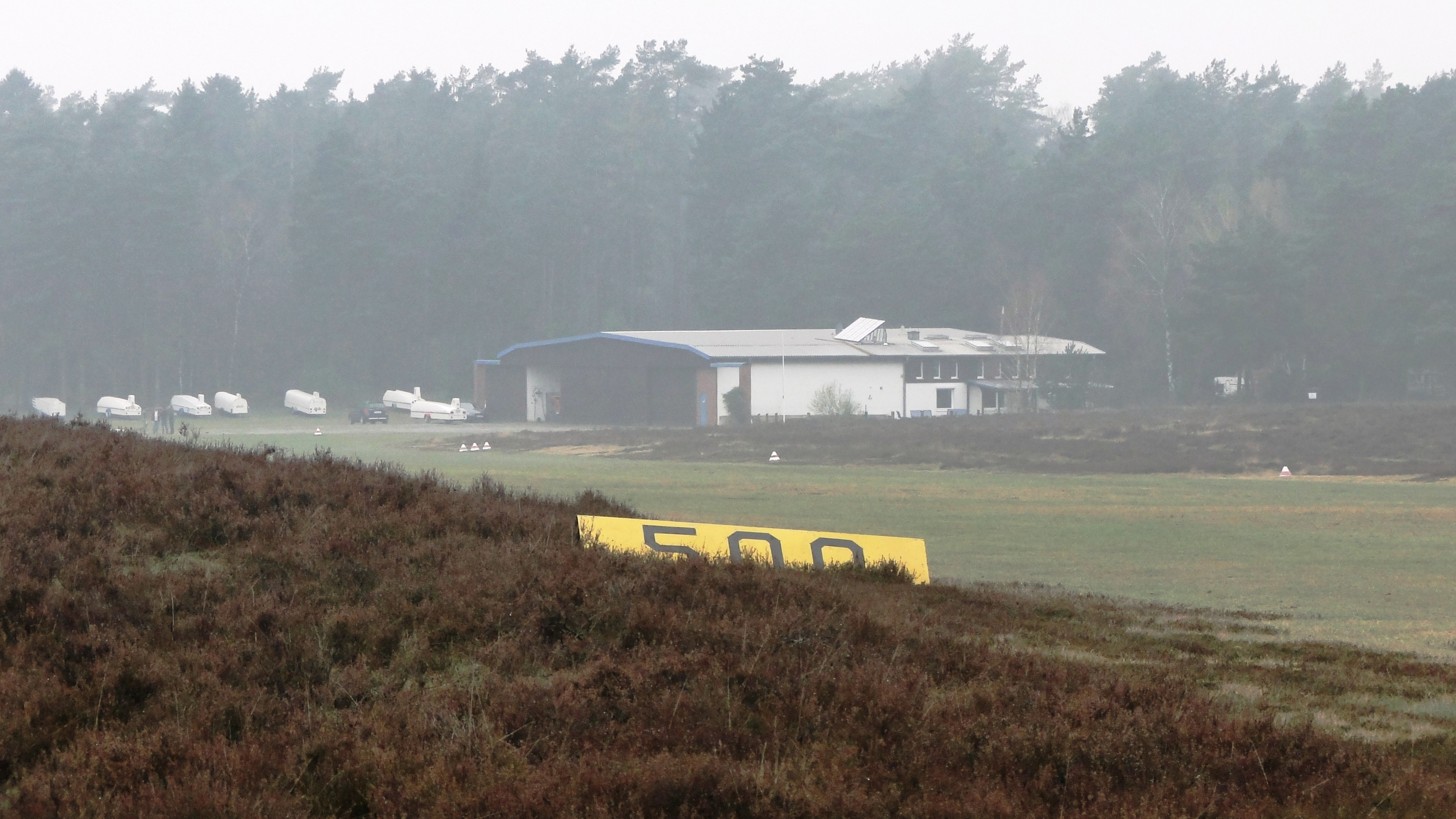
Hangar originally built by the German air force, used today by glider pilots at Airfield Höpen

In 1945, during the final phase of the war, newly developed subsonic jet planes like the first jet-powered bomber Arado 234 were stationed at the airfield and the runway was extended by several hundred metres. At that time, many Ju 88 bombers were 'parked' at Reinsehlen, probably due to a lack of fuel and pilots. Isolated strafing attacks aside, the airfield was never attacked or bombed on a large scale, although it was known to British air recon. On 7 April 1945, a US bomber fleet numbering over 1,000 planes entered German airspace to destroy the remaining military targets before the advance of American ground troops. The airfield at Reinsehlen was on the target list, but due to cloud cover the bombers were unable to find it. As a last-ditch attempt to stop the advancing Allies, an anti-tank ditch was begun and farmers from the area were ordered to plow deep furrows into the airfield's manoeuvring area to make it unusable. However, once British troops arrived, there was no resistance due to a lack of weapons and personnel. The Germans handed over the airfield to the British without a fight on 17 April 1945. A few hours before, German soldiers had burned the remaining planes. Damage to the airfield was quickly repaired by the British. It became known as Advanced Landing Ground B-154 Reinsehlen and before the war ended on 8 May (VE Day), Royal Canadian Air Force planes operated from Reinsehlen, including Spitfires of 127 (RCAF) Wing, No 403 (Wolf) Sqn that came to Reinsehlen on 28 April.

=== Post-war military use (1945-50) ===
Immediately after the end of hostilities in the area, members of the Royal Canadian Air Force occupied the airfield Reinsehlen. In late April 1945, they expelled the families living in five neighbouring farms. Meanwhile, Wehrmacht ammunitions were destroyed, often endangering civilians nearby. In addition, some concrete roads, a runway and other facilities in the northwest were blown up. In the course of 1945 glider pilots started to use the remaining airfield. Reportedly, they were British officers stationed in the Lüneburg area. The Canadians remained in the barracks through the winter of 1945/46. Relations between the occupying forces and the DPs were quite bad, as glider draglines smashed repeatedly into crops and some fields tilled by the DPs were confiscated in 1947 for use by the Allied forces' gliding club. The club also claimed the former ammunitions bunkers as storage space, evicting some of the refugees.

Training exercises by ground forces in the Lüneburg Heath during the early post-war period involved an area of around 48,000 hectares, of which 3,000 were in a designated nature reserve. Until 1949 British and Canadian forces engaged in training exercises right up to the foot of Wilseder Berg, which is today the centre of the Lüneburg Heath Nature Reserve.

=== Displaced Persons camp (1946-50) ===
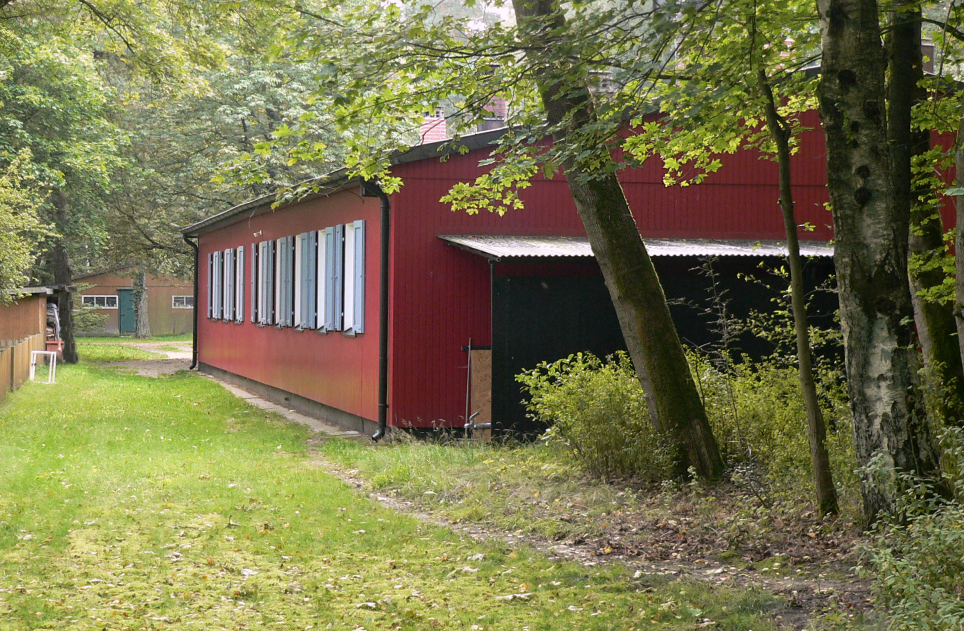
Former DP camp huts, now private property.

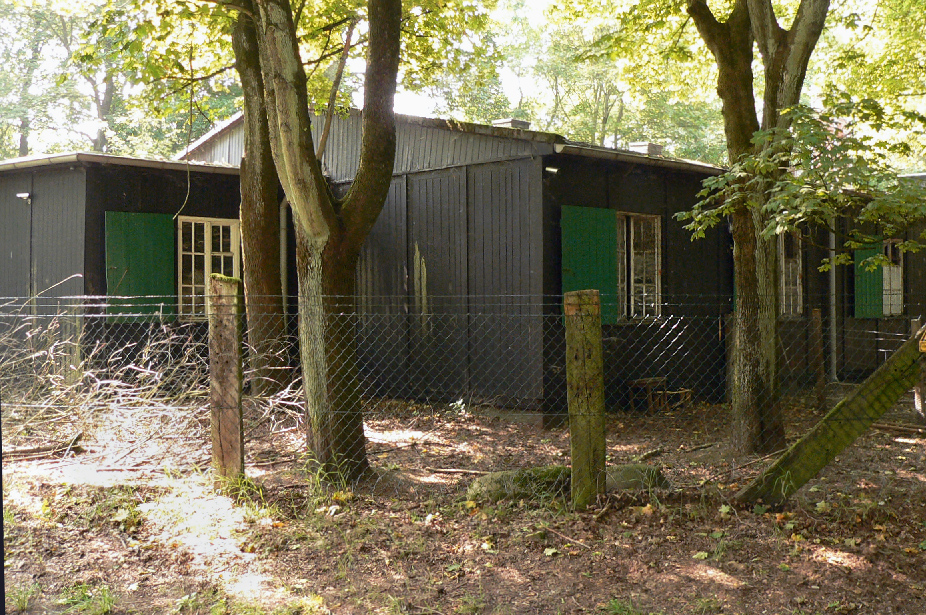
Former hospital, now private property.

==== Establishment ====
In February 1946, the British military government in Allied-occupied Germany told the local authorities of the county of Soltau to expect substantial numbers of refugees. Since Allied bombing raids on major cities had caused an acute shortage of housing even for the existing population, the additional influx of people put a massive strain on housing resources in the occupation zones. To accommodate some of these refugees, the military authorities provided the former airfield buildings at Reinsehlen. There was a total of around 60 buildings, including a large number of so-called Protektoratsbaracken, which measured 42 metres long by 12.5 metres wide. Importantly for a potential refugee camp site, Reinsehlen sported a water works and primitive sewage systems leading to a sump some two kilometres from the centre of the camp. However, the buildings had been totally stripped of all furnishings (including windows, doors and wiring) by Canadian and British troops and by German civilians. Local authorities provided a basic supply of ovens, beds and other furniture.

==== Operations ====
There was not much time for preparations. The first 200 refugees arrived on 10 March 1946. To help feed them, sections of the airfield were transformed into farmland and vegetable gardens. By May, the camp housed 420 people. Then a train arrived with over 1,500 refugees, most of them old people or women and children from Silesia. They came from a camp in Poland, where the food supply had been very inadequate. This influx caused massive overcrowding in the camp. There were not enough jobs in the area, so most of the camp's inmates became dependent on welfare handouts. Paratyphoid fever became a problem.

Over its period of operations from 1946 to 1950 the DP camp housed an average of around 1,500 people, making it one of the largest of its kind in Northern Germany. There was a continuous inflow of around 20 to 50 people per month — soldiers returning from captivity and Germans resettled from Denmark and Schleswig-Holstein. Around 60% of the refugees hailed from Silesia, the others came mainly from Eastern Prussia, the Baltic states, Volhynia, Galicia or the Sudetenland. Initially, there were only around 100 able-bodied men, who mostly worked in agriculture or the timber industry. By 1947, businesses founded in the camp employed more than 300 people. The camp administration and hospital (see below) employed more than 70. A school and kindergarten for 350 children were set up. Church services were held in the former KdF-Hall. The Landkreis Soltau administered the camp, but the inmates elected a camp council and a Lagerleiter (administrator).

==== Hospital ====
When the DP camp became operational, a 150-bed hospital was established in the former officers' quarters of Reinsehlen airfield. Due to malnutrition and the prevalence of infectious diseases among many of the arriving DPs, medical care was a priority. In 1946, average daily occupancy was around 95 patients. As a result of the camp's overcrowding, typhoid fever, TBC and jaundice remained problems in the camp. Through 1950, care in the hospital was mainly run by around 15 Sisters of Saint Elizabeth, most of them expelled from Silesia. After the camp was closed in November 1950, the hospital continued to operate under its own administration. Eventually it became an outlet of the Kreiskrankenhaus Soltau. When the latter moved to new premises in 1968, the Reinsehlen facility was finally closed.

==== Dissolution ====
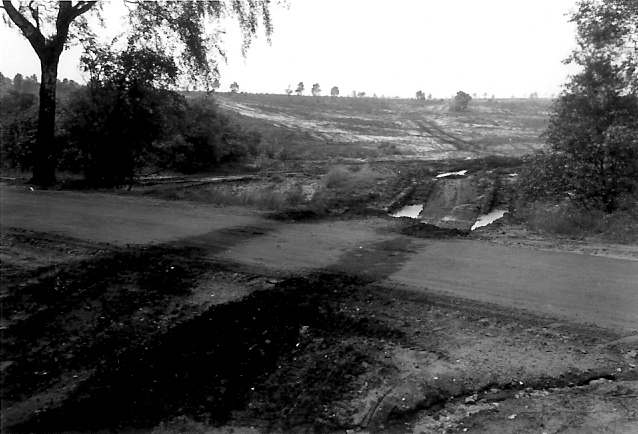
Tank tracks crossing a path near Wilsede, circa 1960.

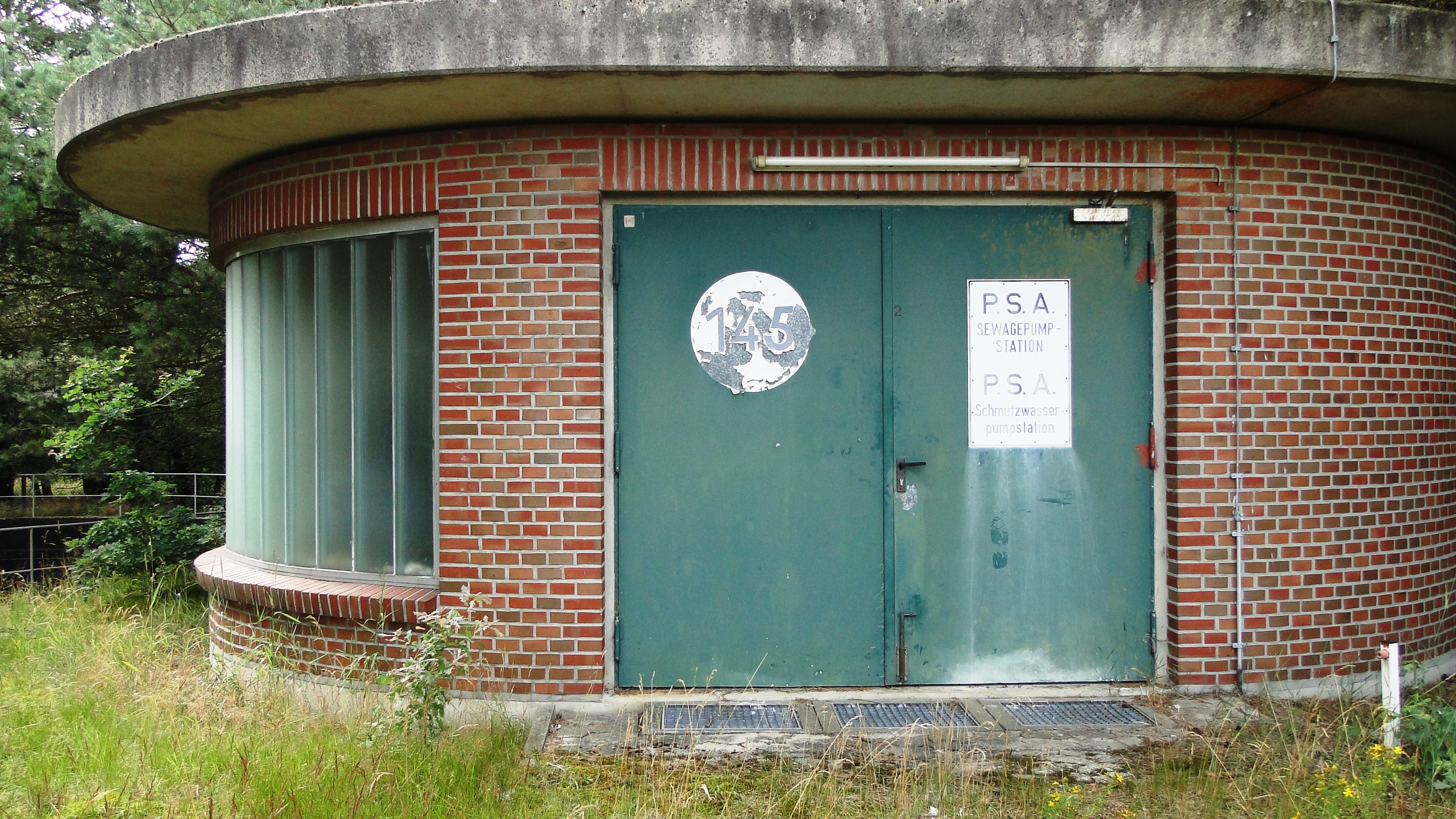
Sewagepump Station, built by the British Armed Forces, now disused.

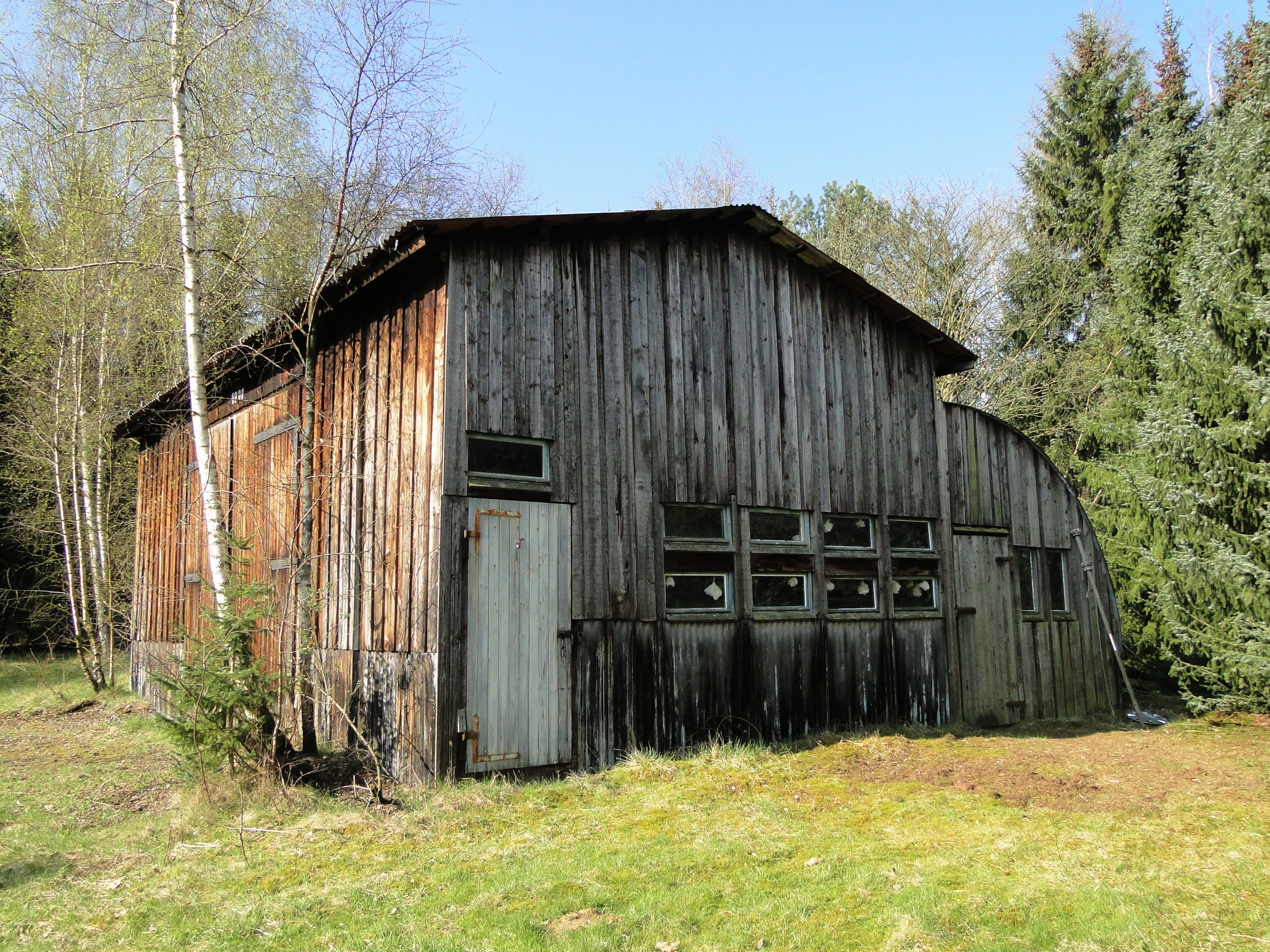
Storage shed, originally built by the British Armed Forces.

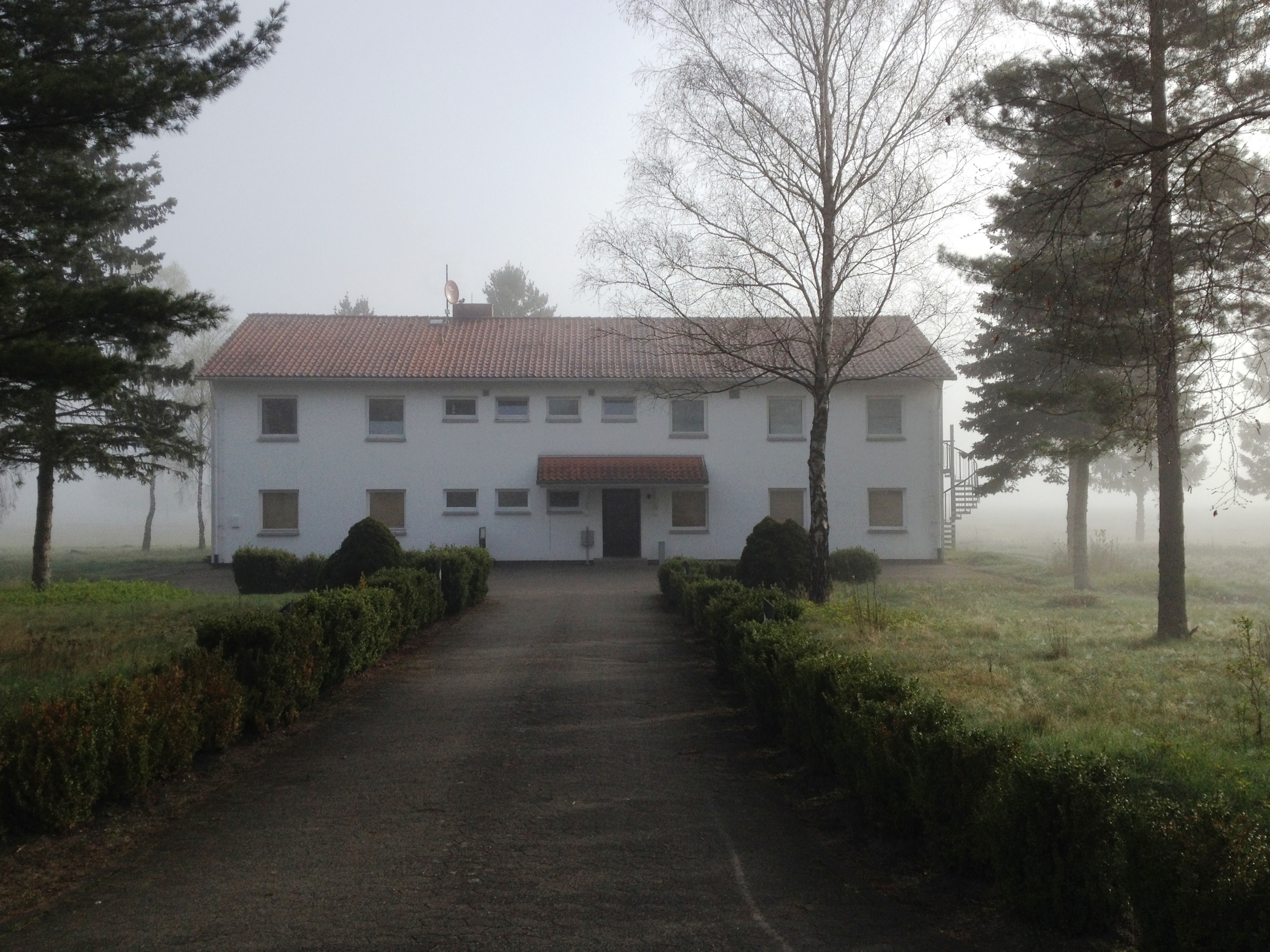
The former British garrison HQ, today used as a hostel.

The British forces had seized the former airfield from the Wehrmacht in 1945. They then had ceded most of it to the German authorities for use as the DP camp, barring those areas used by the gliding club. However, by 1949 there was increasing interest in establishing a training camp for ground forces in the area. In August, the former Kdf-Hall, used for church services, as a school and cinema by the refugees had to be vacated within three days — it was wanted as a cinema for the training troops. In late September, the British issued an eviction order to the German authorities, stating that the whole DP camp should be vacated within eight weeks. Offered alternative accommodations in Munster were deemed even worse than the facilities at Reinsehlen and rejected. After an intervention by Heinrich Albertz, the Lower Saxony Minister for Refugee Affairs, the closure of the camp was postponed until the end of 1950. This would allow time for the construction of new and appropriate housing, using funds supplied by the Landesregierung (regional government) of Lower Saxony.

Most of the refugees eventually resettled in Hambühren, where ammunition bunkers in a former Wehrmacht depot were transformed into housing units with some active help by the camp inmates themselves. Around 200 people moved to Emmelndorf, today part of Seevetal, where a new housing development was built for them. Some 200 DPs moved to Schneverdingen.

=== Military training area (1950-94) ===
Once the DP camp was closed in 1950, British and Canadian armed forces used the area under the name Reinsehlen Camp as starting point and base camp for tank military exercises on the Soltau-Lüneburg Training Area. Although the Canadians soon left, the British forces stayed for over 40 years. Units from various duty stations of the British Army of the Rhine and even from the UK came to engage in training exercises in this area. Armoured vehicles were transported here mainly by train, to the camp's own loading ramps or via railway stations in the vicinity. Movement to and from the training areas was by the Bundesstraße 3 which was connected to the camp by a road. Soldiers lived in tents and later in Nissen huts, dozens of which occupied the open grassland area. By the early 1950s, the Canadians mostly stopped using the training area. From 1952 on, however, the British were using the camp on a permanent basis.

The camp was part of "SLTA", in British military parlance, or the Soltau-Lüneburg-Training-Area. This was named after an accord between the governments of Germany, Canada and the United Kingdom, which was drawn up in 1959, ratified by the Bundestag in 1961 and which came into force on 1 July 1963, called the Soltau-Lüneburg Agreement (German: Soltau-Lüneburg-Abkommen) or SLA. The agreement reduced the training area from 48,100 hectares to 34,500 hectares. Yet these 345 square kilometres were the only military training area in the western world inhabited by civilians. Around 6,500 people lived in the actual training area, with another 15,000 in next-door Schneverdingen. Since the Bundeswehr also used the Lüneburg Heath for exercises, and semi-annual war games were held by German, Dutch and American forces from other nearby bases, the local population was subject to substantial hardships. At times, there were dust clouds over the Osterheide rising up to 300 feet and the noise pollution from tank engines went on at all hours. Crops were destroyed, woodlands damaged, paths made unusable, ammunitions, oil and other refuse were left behind by training troops. Rules that banned mock combat in the immediate surroundings of farms and villages were often ignored. In addition, many serious and even deadly accidents occurred involving tanks and other military vehicles, often left in the road at night with no lights on. Locals formed action groups but failed to make any headway, as support from the federal German government was vital in all dealings with the Allied forces but was not forthcoming. Environmentalists also protested the fact that even after core areas had been excluded from the training grounds, around 1,600 hectares of nature reserve were still "doomed by the agreement to be devastated".

In July 1967, Queen Elizabeth II visited Reinsehlen Camp on occasion of the 50th anniversary of the Royal Tank Regiment, stationed in Soltau at the time. The Queen is the regiment's Colonel-in-Chief. A military parade was staged on the former airfield, involving 270 armoured vehicles and 800 troops.

In 1980, the sewage sumps in the camp were abandoned when it was connected to the Schneverdingen sewer system. Two years later, in 1982, Reinsehlen Camp also started to receive its water supply from the town. There was some controversy when — following terrorist attacks in Northern Ireland — the British suddenly closed a civilian road that passed through the northern end of the camp. Massive protests by locals caused a speedy reversal of that decision, however. In the 1980s, British forces constructed a large facility for cleaning tanks after exercises and a concrete road that connected it to the loading station at a total cost of 1.5 million DM.

Reinsehlen Camp was part of a total of 4,600 hectares of red areas (named after the colour used on the maps in the SLA), in which military training was allowed all year. Only after the fall of the Berlin Wall, in 1990, the British started to refrain from training during the region's peak tourist season, the period when the heather blooms. On 17 October 1991, German Minister of Defence Gerhard Stoltenberg and British Secretary of Defence Tom King signed an understanding for a phased end to training in the Soltau-Lüneburg area by 1994. The SLA finally lapsed on 1 July 1994 and the British forces left Reinsehlen.

The 256th Mobile Civilian Plant Group, stationed at Reinsehlen, consisted of around 100 German civilian employees. They were responsible for cleaning up damage caused by the exercises and helped to repair some of the environmental degradation in the camp area after the British withdrawal. The unit was disbanded in 1997.

== Today ==
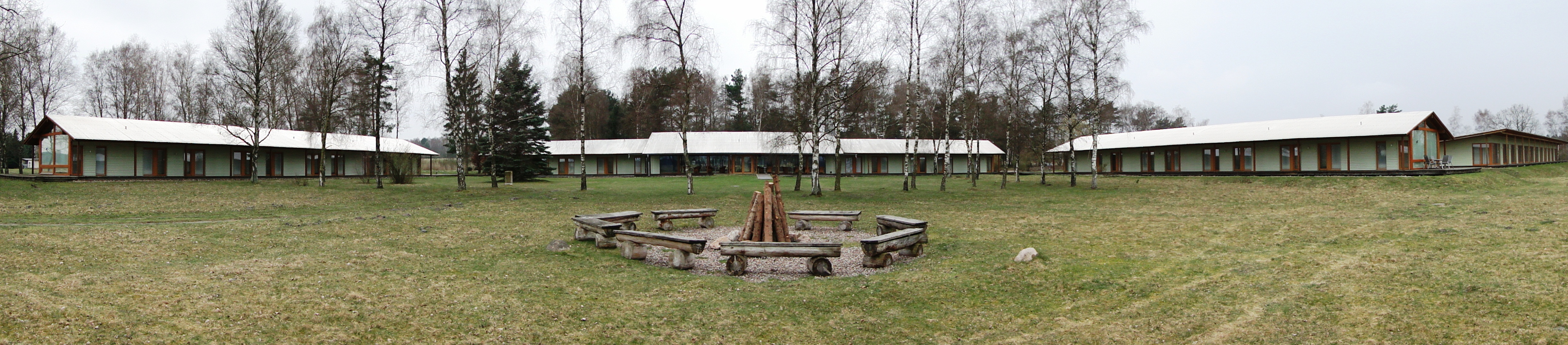
The hotel at Reinsehlen Camp.

After the British troops left, renaturalization work started in the area as well as in the nearby Osterheide (not to be confused with Osterheide further south), where the actual tank exercises had been conducted. Over the decades these training activities had inflicted substantial damage to the environment. The camp was searched for areas of contamination and in two places elevated readings of chemical pollution were discovered. In total, the British government spent around 10.2 million DM through 2001 to restore the "red areas".

In 1997, the town of Schneverdingen purchased most of the camp area from the Federal government of Germany, to whom it had reverted when the British left. After that most of the military structures were torn down. The last of the around 100 Nissen huts is today located in the open-air museum at Kiekeberg.

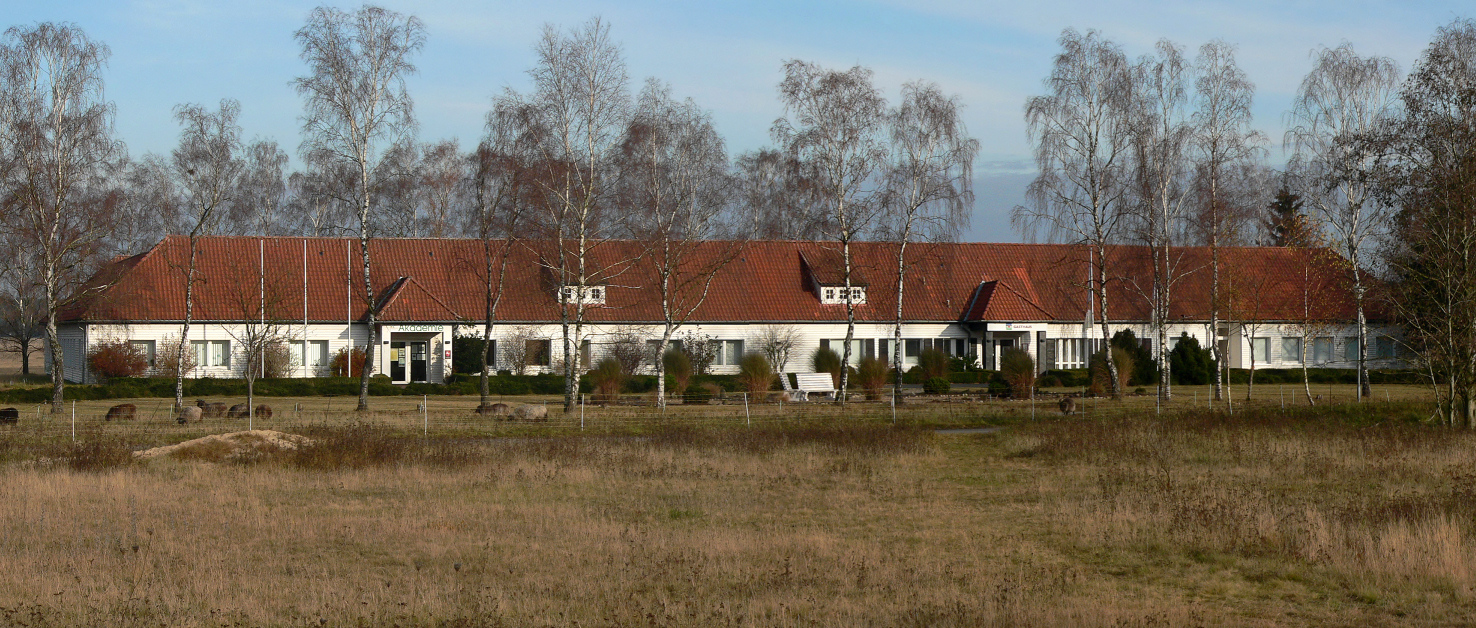
Former officers' mess, today conference venue of the Alfred Toepfer Akademie für Naturschutz and hotel restaurant.

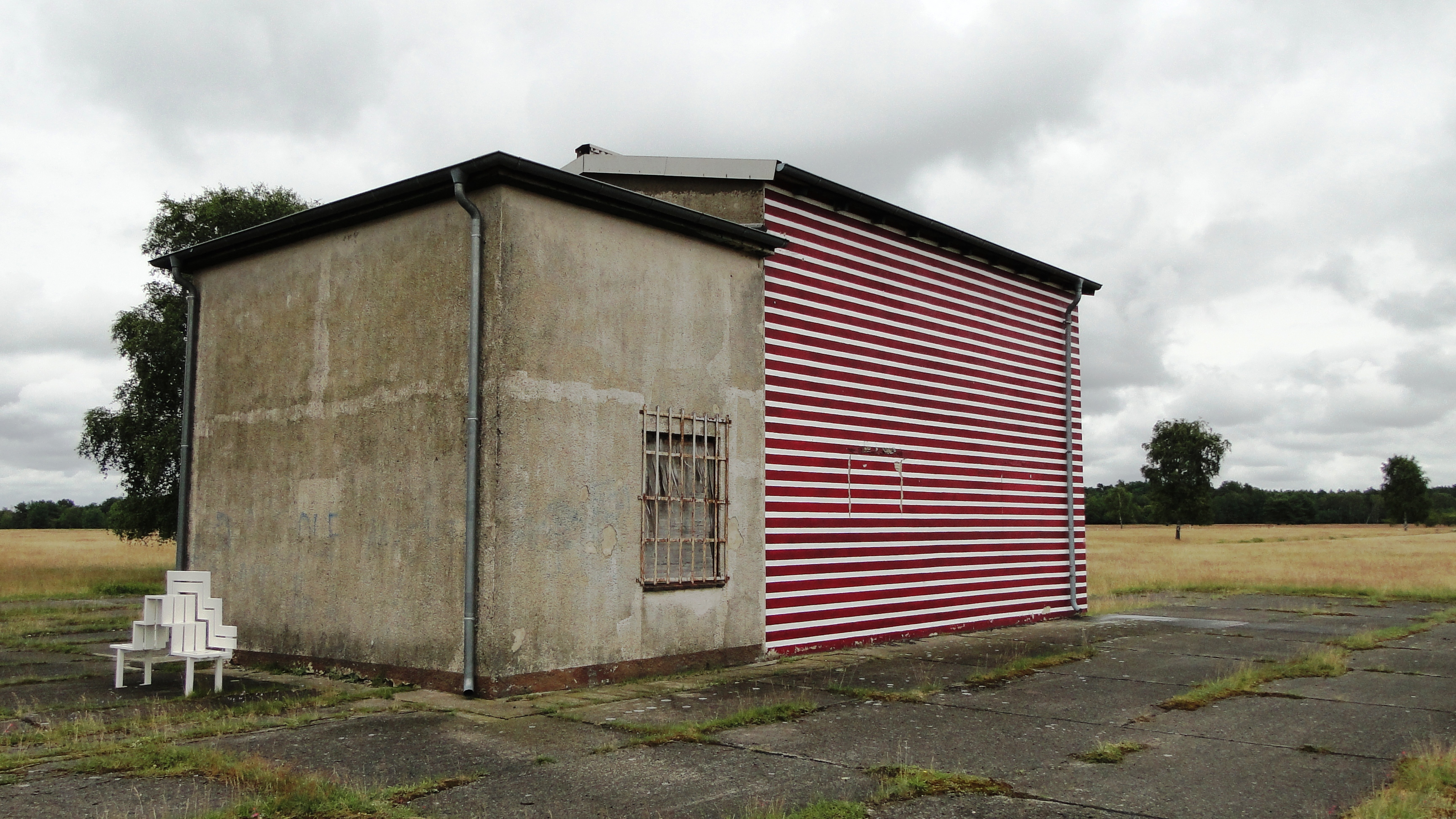
Transformer station built by the British Armed Forces, featuring the painting Zwischenräume and with one of the benches of Parcours next to it

The Alfred Toepfer Akademie für Naturschutz (Alfred Toepfer Academy for Nature Conservation or NNA), now uses the camp's former officers's mess as offices and for seminars. A new hotel was constructed, mostly from wood, with its low structures aiming to blend into the landscape whilst referencing the architecture of military camps. Two of the former tank repair shops are used as conference venues and they also host occasional cultural events (like movie screenings). The former garrison headquarters of the British is now the Gästehaus, an adjunct to the hotel offering cheap hostel-type accommodation.

To the west of the L171 road, a former military hangar is still in use by glider pilots of the gliding club LSV Schneverdingen. This regional airport is known today as Höpen Airfield.

In late October 1998, the Dalai Lama came to Reinsehlen Camp for a week to give an instruction in the basic tenets of Buddhism to a daily audience of more than 10,000 people. A tent city measuring 25,000 square metres was erected for this event.

More recently, a high rope course opened in the facility previously used to clean the tanks.

The camp area also features numerous works of installation art. The sculptor and painter Jörg-Werner Schmidt moved into the camp's former stables and turned them into a studio. In 2005, his first work was Zwischenräume, a painting on the back wall of the transformer station located in the middle of the open field. In 2007, he designed the Bent Pyramid. Other works by Schmidt at Reinsehlen Camp include Slat Humans and the Lavender Laybyrinth. Schmidt died in 2010, and the artist's studio has now been converted into additional conference space for the hotel. Spread over the open grasslands are works by Jeppe Hein, called Parcours, made up of various types of benches.

== See also ==
- Bent Pyramid
- Stalag XI-B
- Stalag XI-C
- Bergen-Hohne Training Area
- Munster Training Area
- Occupation Statute
