= Rethem (Samtgemeinde) =

Samtgemeinde in Lower Saxony

Rethem (Aller)
- Samtgemeinde
- Location of Rethem (Aller) within Heidekreis district
- Interactive map of Rethem (Aller)
- Location within Germany Location within Lower Saxony
- Coordinates: 52°47′N 9°23′E
- Country: Germany
- State: Lower Saxony
- District: Heidekreis
- Seat: Rethem
- Subdivisions: 4 municipalities

Area
  - Total: 109.29 km^{2} (42.20 sq mi)

Population (2025-12-31)
  - Total: 4,558
  - Density: 41.71/km^{2} (108.0/sq mi)
- Time zone: UTC+01:00 (CET)
  - Summer (DST): UTC+02:00 (CEST)
- Website: www.rethem.de

Rethem (Aller) is a Samtgemeinde ("collective municipality") in the district of Heidekreis, in Lower Saxony, Germany. Its seat is in the town Rethem.

The Samtgemeinde Rethem (Aller) consists of the following municipalities:

1. Böhme
2. Frankenfeld
3. Häuslingen
4. Rethem
