= Häuslingen =

- Municipality
- Coat of arms

- Location of Häuslingen within Heidekreis district
- Interactive map of Häuslingen
- Location within Germany Location within Lower Saxony
- Coordinates: 52°48′N 09°23′E
- Country: Germany
- State: Lower Saxony
- District: Heidekreis
- Municipal assoc.: Rethem (Aller)
- Subdivisions: 2 Ortsteile

Government
  - Mayor: Kathrin Wrobel

Area
  - Total: 13.69 km^{2} (5.29 sq mi)
- Elevation: 16 m (52 ft)

Population (2025-12-31)
  - Total: 783
  - Density: 57.2/km^{2} (148/sq mi)
- Time zone: UTC+01:00 (CET)
  - Summer (DST): UTC+02:00 (CEST)
- Postal codes: 27336
- Dialling codes: 05165
- Vehicle registration: HK, SFA
- Website: www.haeuslingen.de

Häuslingen (German pronunciation: [ˈhɔʏslɪŋən]) is a municipality in the district of Heidekreis, in Lower Saxony, Germany.
