= Buchholz (Aller) =

- Municipality
- Coat of arms

- Location of Buchholz (Aller) within Heidekreis district
- Interactive map of Buchholz (Aller)
- Location within Germany Location within Lower Saxony
- Coordinates: 52°40′N 9°41′E
- Country: Germany
- State: Lower Saxony
- District: Heidekreis
- Municipal assoc.: Schwarmstedt
- Subdivisions: 2 Ortschaften

Government
  - Mayor: Thomas Kliemann (SPD)

Area
  - Total: 27.1 km^{2} (10.5 sq mi)
- Elevation: 29 m (95 ft)

Population (2025-12-31)
  - Total: 2,152
  - Density: 79.4/km^{2} (206/sq mi)
- Time zone: UTC+01:00 (CET)
  - Summer (DST): UTC+02:00 (CEST)
- Postal codes: 29690
- Dialling codes: 0 50 71
- Vehicle registration: HK
- Website: www.buchholz-aller.de

Buchholz (Aller) (German pronunciation: [ˈbuːxhɔlts]) is a municipality in the Heidekreis district, in Lower Saxony, Germany.
