= Gilten, Germany =

Gilten
- Municipality
- Coat of arms

- Location of Gilten within Heidekreis district
- Interactive map of Gilten
- Location within Germany Location within Lower Saxony
- Coordinates: 52°42′N 9°35′E
- Country: Germany
- State: Lower Saxony
- District: Heidekreis
- Municipal assoc.: Schwarmstedt
- Subdivisions: 4 Ortschaften

Government
  - Mayor: Erich Lohse

Area
  - Total: 33.54 km^{2} (12.95 sq mi)
- Elevation: 24 m (79 ft)

Population (2025-12-31)
  - Total: 1,250
  - Density: 37.3/km^{2} (96.5/sq mi)
- Time zone: UTC+01:00 (CET)
  - Summer (DST): UTC+02:00 (CEST)
- Postal codes: 29690
- Dialling codes: 05071, 05074 OT Suderbruch)
- Vehicle registration: HK, FAL, SFA

Gilten (German pronunciation: [ˈɡɪltn̩]) is a municipality in the district of Heidekreis, in Lower Saxony, Germany.
