= Pietzmoor =

Coordinates: 53°05′42″N 9°49′32″E

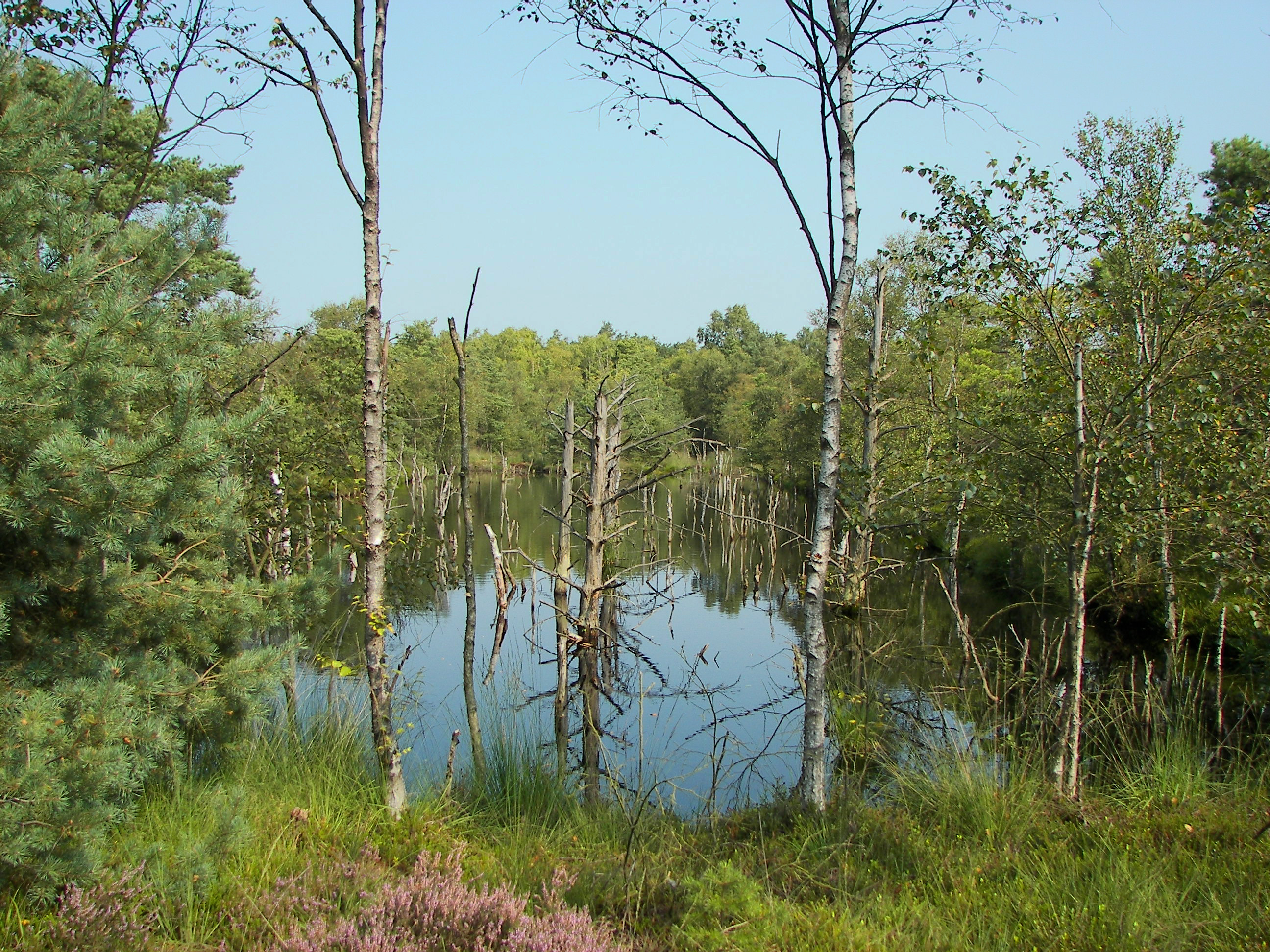
Pietzmoor

The Pietzmoor (literally "Pietz Bog") is a bog southeast of the town of Schneverdingen, Lower Saxony, Germany.

== Geography ==
The Pietzmoor is the largest contiguous area of bog on the Lüneburg Heath. The bog lies southeast of the town of Schneverdingen and is bordered to the south by the village of Heber.

The Pietzmoor has an average peat depth of 4 m, its maximum thickness is 7.5 m. The bog is the source of the rivers Böhme and Veerse.

== History ==
The bog is named after the little village of Pietz.

For centuries the bog provided the inhabitants of the surrounding villages with peat for fuel.

Today the Pietzmoor is a tourist destination in the Lüneburg Heath Nature Reserve with an area of 2.5 km^{2}. Two board walks, 4.8 km and 6.6 km long, run right through the marshy terrain.
