= Schwarmstedt (Samtgemeinde) =

Municipality in Lower Saxony, Germany

- Samtgemeinde
- Location of Schwarmstedt within Heidekreis district
- Interactive map of Schwarmstedt
- Location within Germany Location within Lower Saxony
- Coordinates: 52°40′N 9°37′E
- Country: Germany
- State: Lower Saxony
- District: Heidekreis
- Seat: Schwarmstedt
- Subdivisions: 5 municipalities

Area
  - Total: 141.63 km^{2} (54.68 sq mi)

Population (2025-12-31)
  - Total: 13,130
  - Density: 92.71/km^{2} (240.1/sq mi)
- Time zone: UTC+01:00 (CET)
  - Summer (DST): UTC+02:00 (CEST)
- Website: www.schwarmstedt.de

Schwarmstedt is a Samtgemeinde ("collective municipality") in the district of Heidekreis, in Lower Saxony, Germany. Its seat is in the village Schwarmstedt.

The Samtgemeinde Schwarmstedt consists of the following municipalities:

1. Buchholz
2. Essel
3. Gilten
4. Lindwedel
5. Schwarmstedt
