= Lüneburg Regional Association =

Location

The Lüneburg Regional Association (German: Lüneburgische Landschaftsverband) is a registered association in the German state of Lower Saxony and is one of a number of regional associations in the state.

== History ==
The association was founded in 1990 under the name of "Regional Cultural Support in the former Principality of Lüneburg" (Regionale Kulturförderung im ehemaligen Fürstentum Lüneburg) but was renamed in 1997. Its sphere of activity covers the region of the historic Principality of Lüneburg and thus predominantly the Lüneburg Heath, but also the Wendland and Amt Neuhaus. Members of the Lüneburg Regional Association are the Landkreis (counties) of Harburg, Lüneburg, Uelzen, Soltau-Fallingbostel, Celle, Gifhorn and Lüchow-Dannenberg, die towns of Lüneburg, Celle and Wolfsburg as well as the historic estates of the former Principality of Lüneburg.

== Role ==
The primary role of the Lüneburg Regional Association, like the other regions and regional associations in Lower Saxony, is to carry out cultural-political functions. It has the legal status of a registered charity (eingetragener Verein) and looks after central, communal tasks on behalf of its local authorities and local tasks on behalf of the state of Lower Saxony, in the areas of culture, science, and education. Its work is financed on the one hand by grants from the state of Lower Saxony, and on the other hand by contributions from its member authorities and grants from the regional fire office, of which the estates of the former Principality of Lüneburg, a member of the regional association, form a part.
