= Frankenfeld, Lower Saxony =

- Municipality
- Location of Frankenfeld, Lower Saxony within Heidekreis district
- Interactive map of Frankenfeld, Lower Saxony
- Location within Germany Location within Lower Saxony
- Coordinates: 52°46′6″N 9°25′44″E
- Country: Germany
- State: Lower Saxony
- District: Heidekreis
- Municipal assoc.: Rethem (Aller)
- Subdivisions: 3 Ortsteile

Government
  - Mayor: Renate Rodewald

Area
  - Total: 24.52 km^{2} (9.47 sq mi)
- Elevation: 18 m (59 ft)

Population (2025-12-31)
  - Total: 506
  - Density: 20.6/km^{2} (53.4/sq mi)
- Time zone: UTC+01:00 (CET)
  - Summer (DST): UTC+02:00 (CEST)
- Postal codes: 27336
- Dialling codes: 0 51 65
- Vehicle registration: HK, SFA

Frankenfeld (German pronunciation: [ˈfʁaŋkn̩fɛlt]) is a municipality in the Heidekreis district, in Lower Saxony, Germany.
