= Heidekreis =

District in Lower Saxony, Germany

Coordinates: 52°55′N 9°45′E

- District
- Flag Coat of arms
- Country: Germany
- State: Lower Saxony
- Capital: Bad Fallingbostel

Government
  - District admin.: Jens Grote (Ind.)

Area
  - Total: 1,873.5 km^{2} (723.4 sq mi)

Population (31 December 2025)
  - Total: 141,473
  - Density: 75.513/km^{2} (195.58/sq mi)
- Time zone: UTC+01:00 (CET)
  - Summer (DST): UTC+02:00 (CEST)
- Vehicle registration: HK (until 31.7.2011: SFA)
- Website: www.heidekreis.de

Heidekreis ("Heath district") is a district (Landkreis) in Lower Saxony, Germany. It is bounded by (from the north and clockwise) the districts of Harburg, Lüneburg, Uelzen, Celle, Hanover, Nienburg, Verden and Rotenburg.

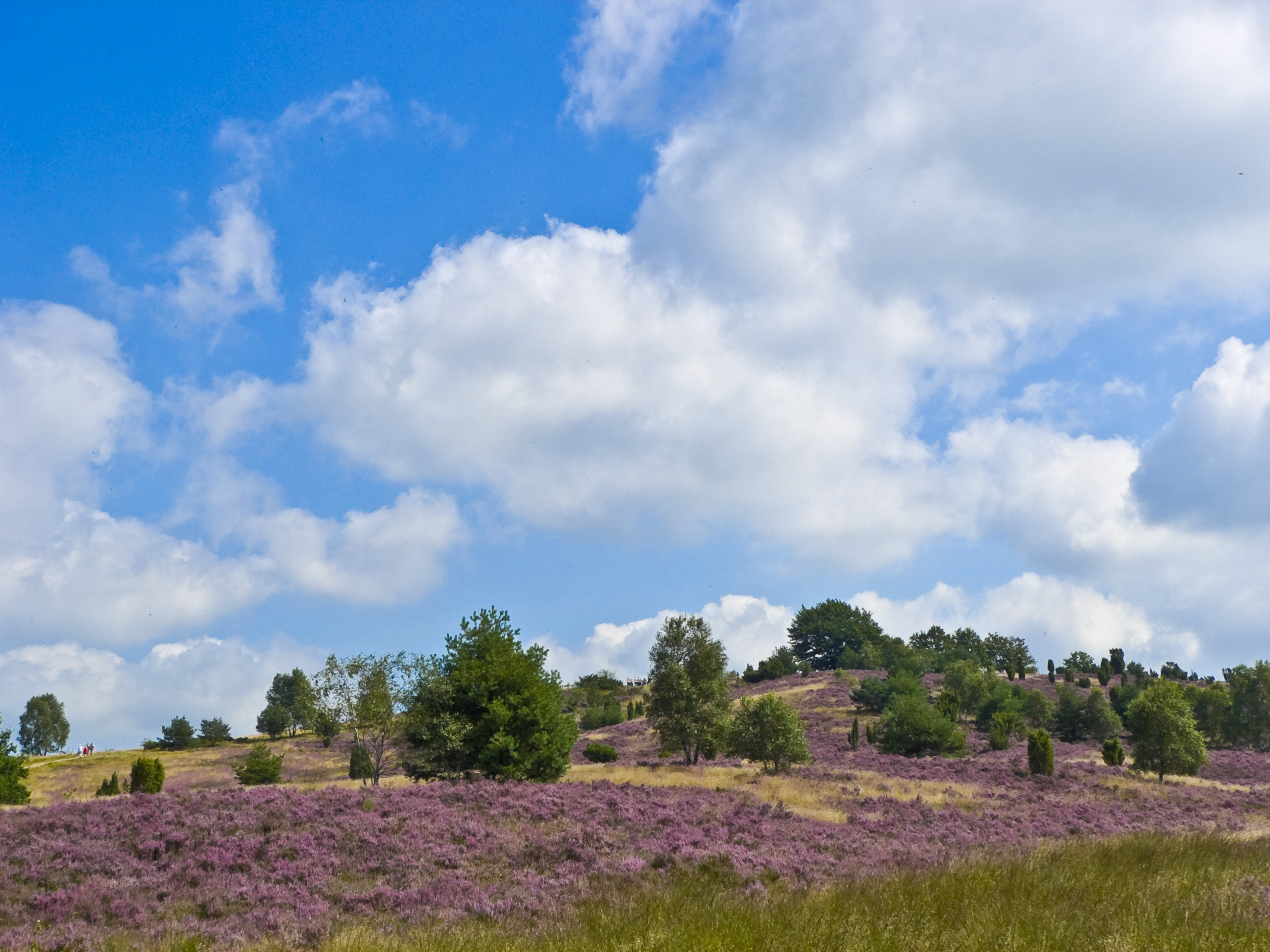
Wilseder Berg in the Lüneburg Heath

== History ==
Historically the region belonged to the Duchy of Brunswick-Lüneburg and its successor states. The district was established in 1977 by merging the former districts of Soltau and Fallingbostel as Soltau-Fallingbostel (German pronunciation: [ˈzɔltaʊ falɪŋˈbɔstəl]). On 1 August 2011 it was renamed to Heidekreis.

== Geography ==
The district includes the western half of the Lüneburg Heath (Lüneburger Heide). Since this landscape is so characteristic for the district, it calls itself "the Heath District". The capital is Bad Fallingbostel, although it has only 11,800 inhabitants and is only the fifth-largest town in the district.

== Coat of arms ==
The coat of arms displays:

- in the upper half the heraldic lion of the Duchy of Brunswick-Lüneburg
- in the lower half a megalithic grave

== Towns and municipalities ==
Clickable map of towns and municipalities in the district

Towns	Samtgemeinden
1. Bad Fallingbostel; 2. Munster; 3. Schneverdingen; 4. Soltau; 5. Walsrode; Free municipalities: 1. Bispingen; 2. Neuenkirchen; 3. Wietzendorf; Unincorporated area: 1. Osterheide	1. Ahlden; 1. Ahlden; 2. Eickeloh; 3. Grethem; 4. Hademstorf; 5. Hodenhagen^{1}; 2. Rethem (Aller); 1. Böhme; 2. Frankenfeld; 3. Häuslingen; 4. Rethem^{1, 2}	3. Schwarmstedt; 1. Buchholz; 2. Essel; 3. Gilten; 4. Lindwedel; 5. Schwarmstedt^{1}
	^{1}seat of the Samtgemeinde; ^{2}town

== Culture and places of interest ==
Cultural matters are looked after by those charged with communal cultural support within the towns and municipalities, the parishes, the banks, the Lüneburg Regional Association and private cultural initiatives.

=== Museums and collections ===
- Dat ole Hus (heath and open-air museum in Wilsede)
- German Tank Museum in Munster (German military history of the 20th century)
- Düshorn Village Museum (life and work around 100 years ago)
- Hof der Heidmark in Bad Fallingbostel (memorial to the Heidmark)
- Klingendes Museum (mechanical musical instruments) in Schwarmstedt
- Museum of the Archaeological Working Group in Bad Fallingbostel
- Soltau Museum (local history and archaeological exhibition) in Soltau
- Soltau Toy Museum (toys from four centuries)
- Peetshof (Zeugen Wietzendorfs um 1900) in Wietzendorf
- Prussian History (Pavillon im Landschaftspark Iserhatsche) in Bispingen
- Pult- und Federkielmuseum (Schulmuseum in Insel) in Schneverdingen
- Rischmannshof Heath Museum (heath and open-air museum) in Walsrode
- Schäferhof Neuenkirchen (Moorland sheep rearing to preserve the heath and moorlands between Neuenkirchen and Soltau) in Neuenkirchen
- Heimathaus auf dem Schroershof (historic farmstead with many buildings) in Neuenkirchen
- Art Society and Springhornhof Foundation in Neuenkirchen
- Bothmer School Museum (schools in the times of the Emperor) in Schwarmstedt
- Ehrhorn Woodland Museum (woods – heathland – people) in Schneverdingen

=== Cinemas ===
- Munster: Deutsches Haus
- Walsrode: Capitol-Theater

=== Lüneburg Regional Association ===
The district is a member of the Lüneburg Regional Association (Lüneburgischer Landschaftsverband), which looks after regional, cultural-political tasks.

=== Nature reserves ===
There are 29 nature reserves in the Heidekreis. The largest one (Lüneburg Heath Nature Reserve) has an area of 13,222 ha in the territory of the Heidekreis, the smallest (Söhlbruch) has an area of 8 ha.

=== Jewish cemeteries ===
There are four Jewish cemeteries in Soltau-Fallingbostel : in Ahlden, Rethem, Soltau und Walsrode. There are protected cultural monuments – stone witnesses to former Jewish communities and a thriving Jewish parish live into the 1930s. The cemeteries are mainly on the edge of parishes.

== See also ==
- Hannover–Braunschweig–Göttingen–Wolfsburg Metropolitan Region
