= Höpen Airfield =

Höpen Airfield Segelflugplatz Höpen
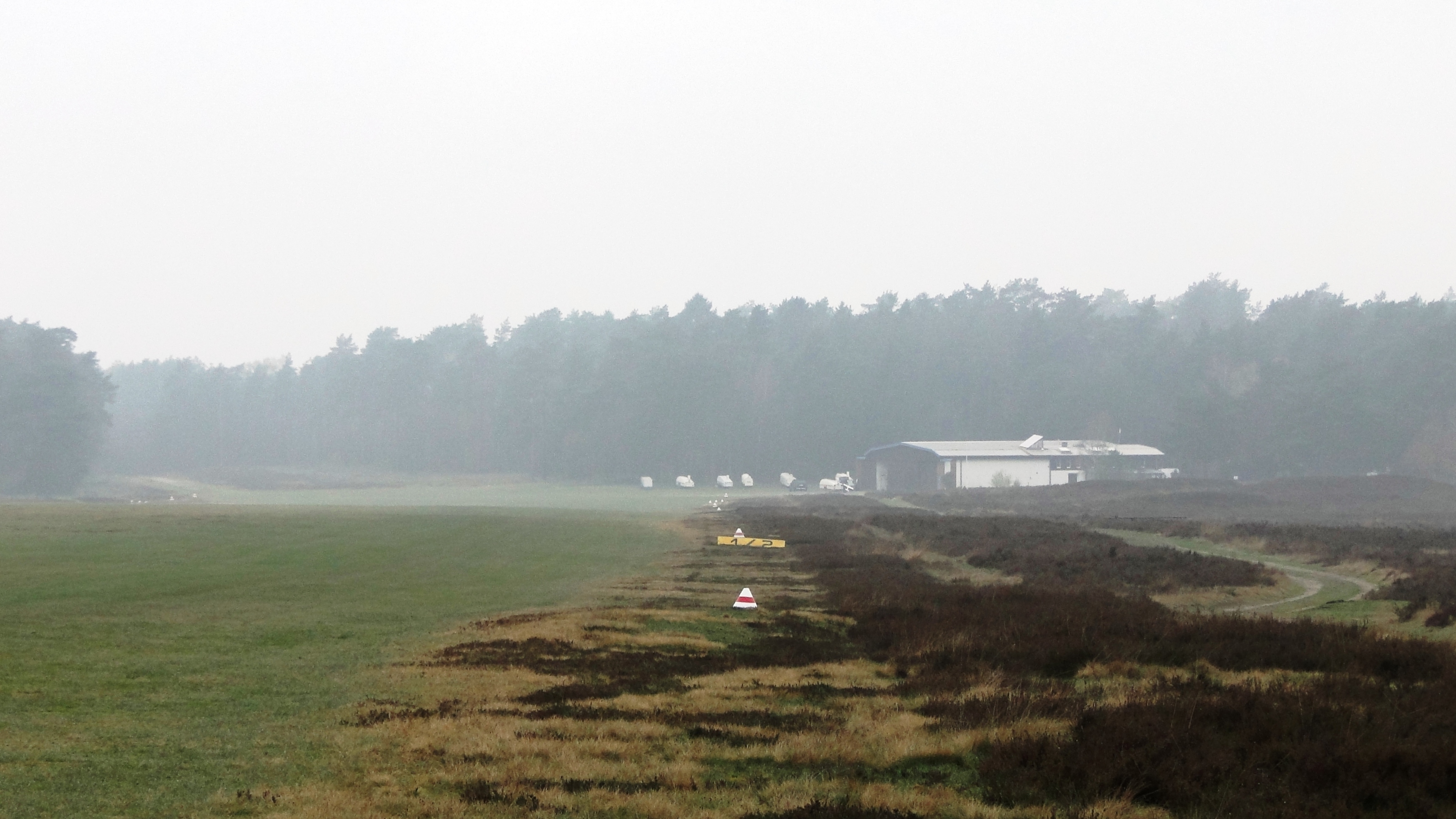
- Runway, gliders and hangar on a foggy day
- IATA: none; ICAO: none

Summary
- Airport type: Glider
- Owner: LSV Schneverdingen
- Location: Schneverdingen, Germany
- Elevation AMSL: 73 m (240 ft)
- Coordinates: 53°08′50″N 009°47′41″E
- Website: www.lsv-schneverdingen.de

Map
- Location of Höpen Airfield

Runways
Direction	Length		Surface
Direction	m	ft	Surface
10/28	909	3,000	Grass

Höpen Airfield is a glider airfield near the town of Schneverdingen in Lower Saxony, Germany. It supports glider flying with no commercial aviation at the field.

== History ==
Towards the end of World War II, the landing field was used by the British Royal Air Force as Advanced Landing Ground B-154 Reinsehlen.
