= Schwarmstedt =

- Municipality
- Coat of arms

- Location of Schwarmstedt within Heidekreis district
- Interactive map of Schwarmstedt
- Location within Germany Location within Lower Saxony
- Coordinates: 52°40′N 9°37′E
- Country: Germany
- State: Lower Saxony
- District: Heidekreis

Government
  - Mayor: Claudia Schiesgeries

Area
  - Total: 30.23 km^{2} (11.67 sq mi)
- Elevation: 26 m (85 ft)

Population (2025-12-31)
  - Total: 5,777
  - Density: 191.1/km^{2} (495.0/sq mi)
- Time zone: UTC+01:00 (CET)
  - Summer (DST): UTC+02:00 (CEST)
- Postal codes: 29690
- Dialling codes: 05071
- Vehicle registration: HK
- Website: schwarmstedt.de

Schwarmstedt (German pronunciation: [ˈʃvaʁmʃtɛt]) is a municipality in the Heidekreis in Lower Saxony, Germany. It is situated near the confluence of the rivers Aller and Leine, approx. 20 km south of Bad Fallingbostel, and 30 km east of Nienburg. Further districts of the municipality are

- Bothmer
- Grindau

Schwarmstedt is the seat of the Samtgemeinde ("collective municipality") Schwarmstedt.

== Transportation ==
The Bundesstraße 214 leads through Schwarmstedt, connecting the cities of Nienburg/Weser and Celle. Schwarmstedt is nearby the A 7 and has a train station for the line section Soltau - Hannover (Heidebahn).

== History ==
The area around the church of Schwarmstedt (ecclesia swarmstede) have been donated by the Edelherr Mirabilis to the Bishopric of Minden around 1150AD. The old church of Schwarmstedt was replaced around 1500AD by a new church (St. Laurentius Church), which stands to this day. It is presumed that the land changed ownership at the end of the 14th century and was then owned by the duchy of Braunschweig-Lüneburg.

== Politics ==
=== Municipal council ===
data as of 22/01/2012

- SPD - 12 seats
- CDU - 5 seats

=== Town twinnings ===
Schwarmstedt is twinned to Kröpelin (Mecklenburg-Western Pomerania) and Miekinia in the polish Lower Silesian Voivodeship.

== Famous persons ==
The macroeconomist Wilhelm Röpke was born in Schwarmstedt on 10 October 1899. He worked as a scientist and political advisor in post-war Germany and had a relevant influence on its development at that time. The local school was named after him in his honor.
