= Schneverdingen =

- Town
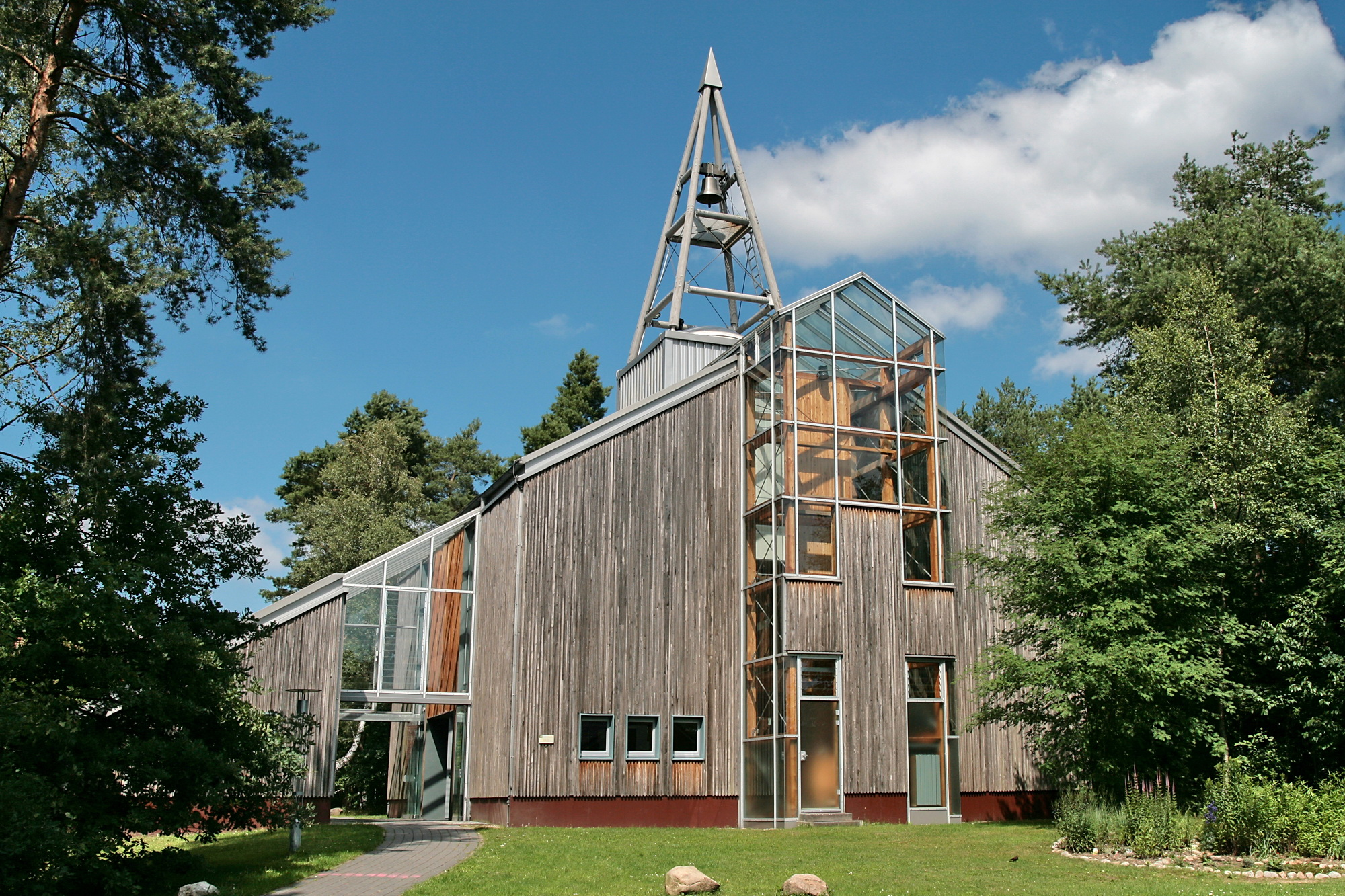
- One World Church

- Coat of arms

- Location of Schneverdingen within Heidekreis district
- Interactive map of Schneverdingen
- Location within Germany Location within Lower Saxony
- Coordinates: 53°07′00″N 09°48′00″E
- Country: Germany
- State: Lower Saxony
- District: Heidekreis
- Subdivisions: 10 districts

Government
  - Mayor (2019–24): Meike Moog-Steffens (Ind.)

Area
  - Total: 234.92 km^{2} (90.70 sq mi)
- Elevation: 97 m (318 ft)

Population (2025-12-31)
  - Total: 18,964
  - Density: 80.725/km^{2} (209.08/sq mi)
- Time zone: UTC+01:00 (CET)
  - Summer (DST): UTC+02:00 (CEST)
- Postal codes: 29640
- Dialling codes: 05193, -98, -99, 04265
- Vehicle registration: HK, SFA
- Website: www.schneverdingen.de

Schneverdingen (German pronunciation: [ˈʃneːvɐdɪŋən]; Low German: Snevern) is a town in the northern part of the district of Heidekreis, in Lower Saxony, Germany. It is located in the area known as Lüneburg Heath.

== Geography ==
=== Location ===
Schneverdingen is situated approximately 15 km (9 mi) north of Soltau, and 65 km (40 mi) southwest of Hamburg.

== History ==
The oldest document in which Schneverdingen was mentioned was written in 1231. The place was mentioned under the name "Snewordinge". Schneverdingen belonged to the Prince-Bishopric of Verden, established in 1180. In 1648 the Prince-Bishopric was transformed into the Principality of Verden, which was first ruled in personal union by the Swedish Crown - interrupted by a Danish occupation (1712–1715) - and from 1715 on by the Hanoverian Crown. The Kingdom of Hanover incorporated the Principality in a real union and the Princely territory, including Schneverdingen, became part of the new Stade Region, established in 1823. At the beginning of the 20th century it had 1.747 inhabitants. In 1976 Schneverdingen obtained municipal status as a "town".

== Government ==
=== Town twinning ===
Schneverdingen is twinned with:

- Barlinek, Poland
- Eksjö, Sweden

== Places of interest ==
- Several well-preserved examples of traditional architecture with rooves made of straw can be seen in Main Street and in Schulstrasse Street.
- Saint Ansgar Church is a modern Roman Catholic Church dating from 1963. It has the shape of a large shed for sheep. A memorial of Ansgar, the "Apostle of the North", was erected in front of it. The church is close to the Town Hall which was built in 1965.
- Saint Peter and Paul Church, a protestant church with a bell tower dating from 1865, has been the landmark of Schneverdingen since 1746.
- One World Church is a modern protestant church dating from 1999.
- Höpen Airfield
- Reinsehlen Camp
- Heidegarten is a park founded in 1990 with more than 200 different species of heather.
- Pietzmoor

== Traffic connections ==
Schneverdingen has a railway station on Heath Railway line with direct connections to Hanover and Hamburg.

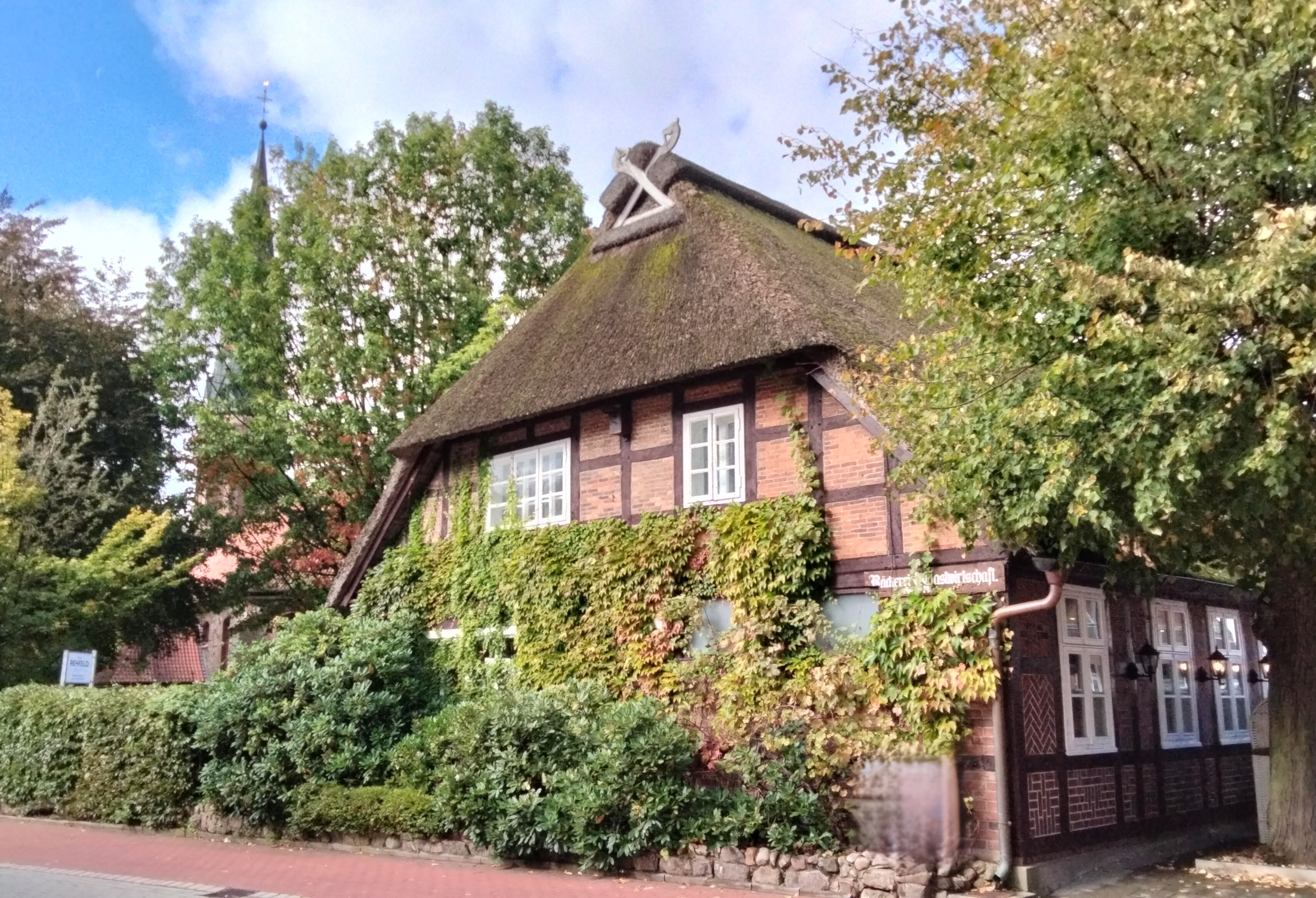
Traditional architecture in Main Street

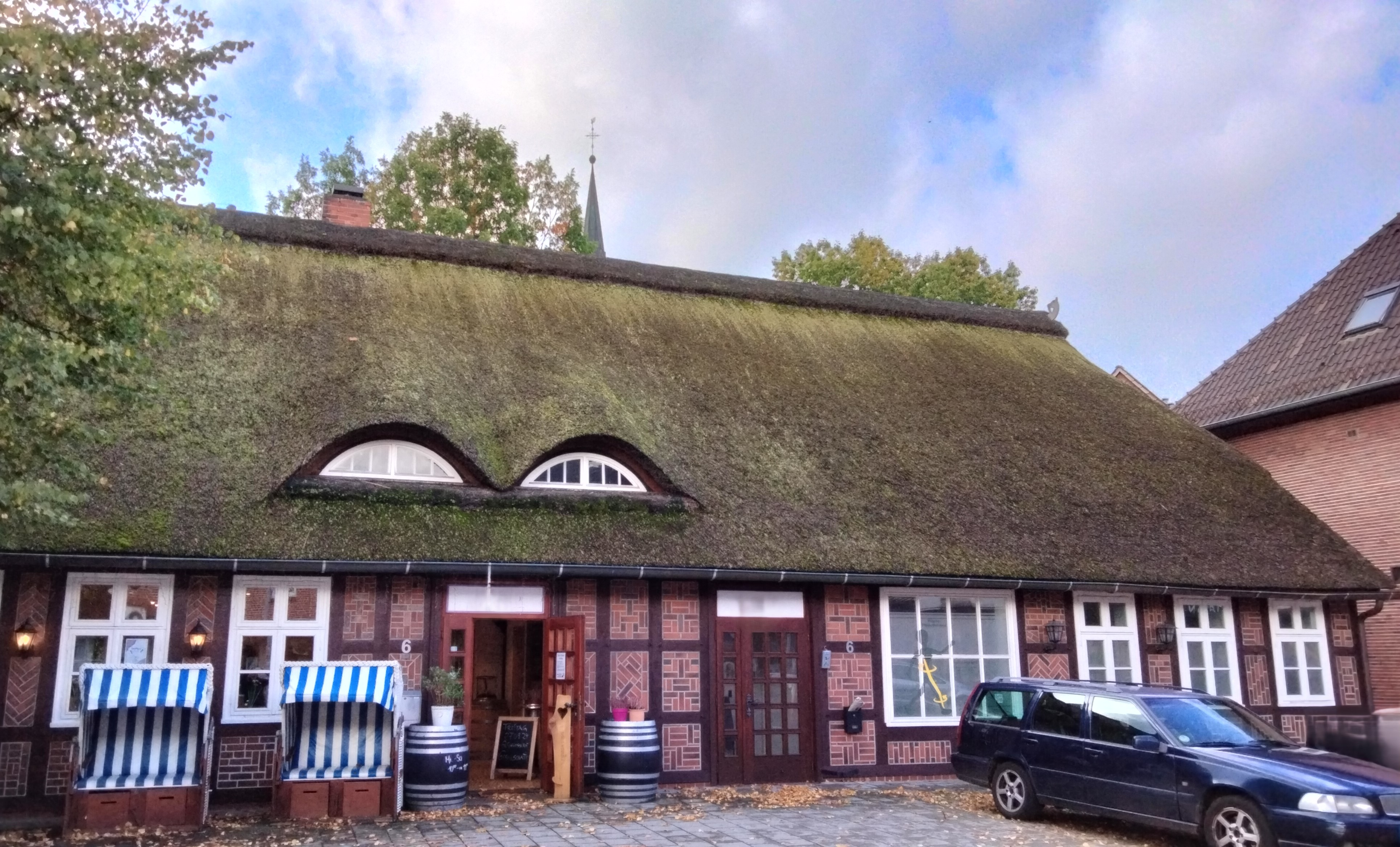
Traditional architecture in Main Street

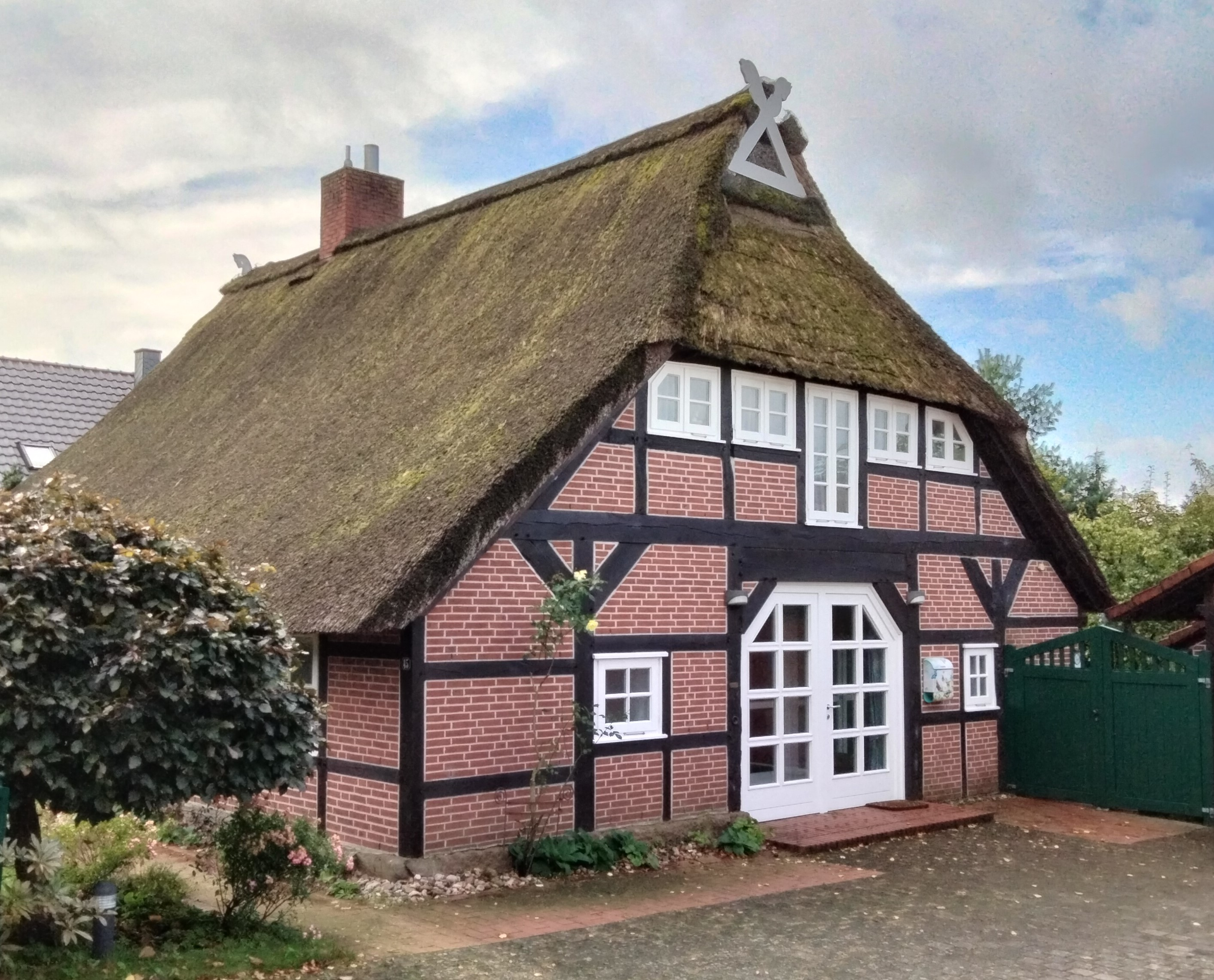
Traditional architecture in Schulstrasse Street

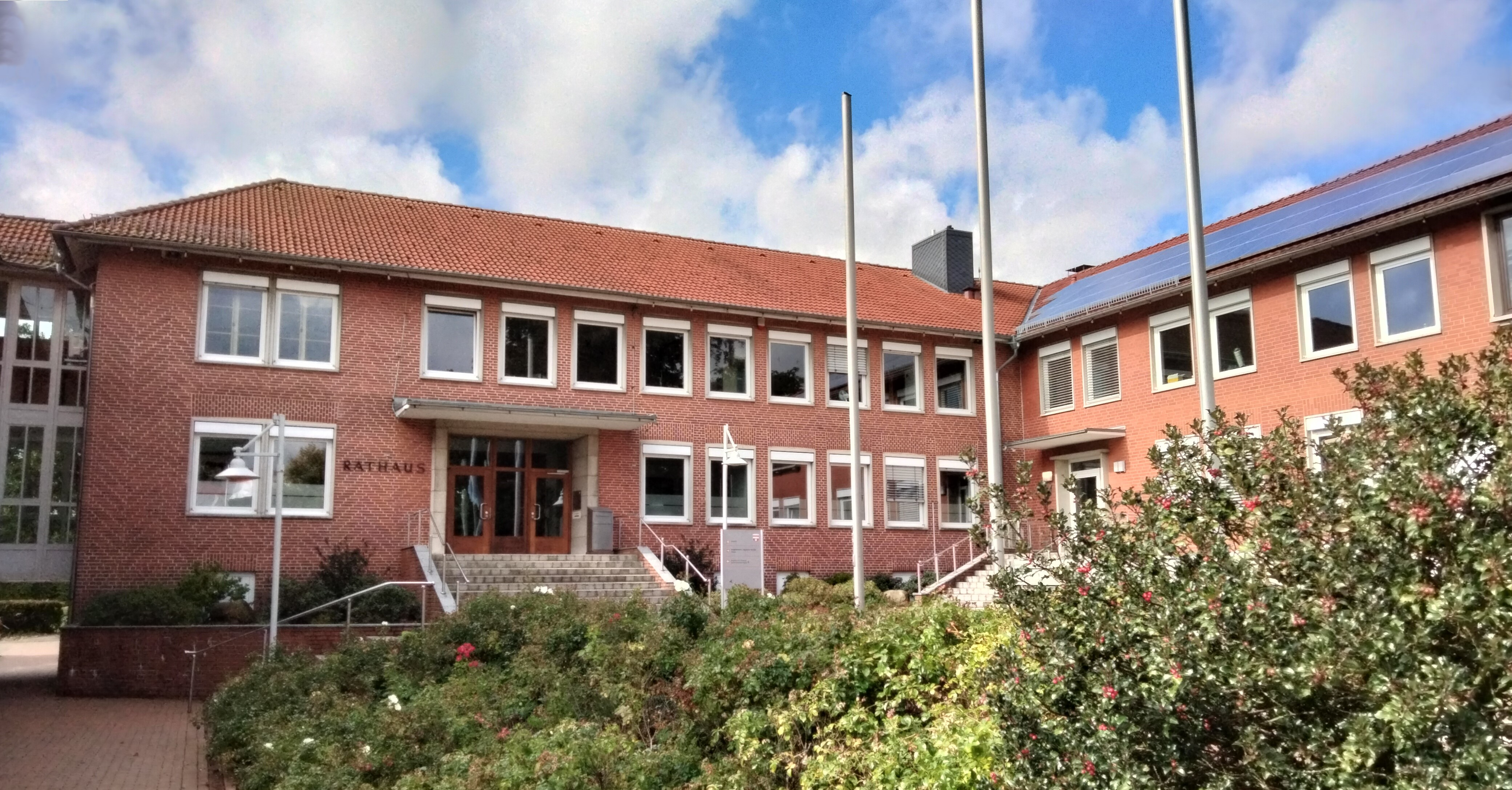
Town Hall

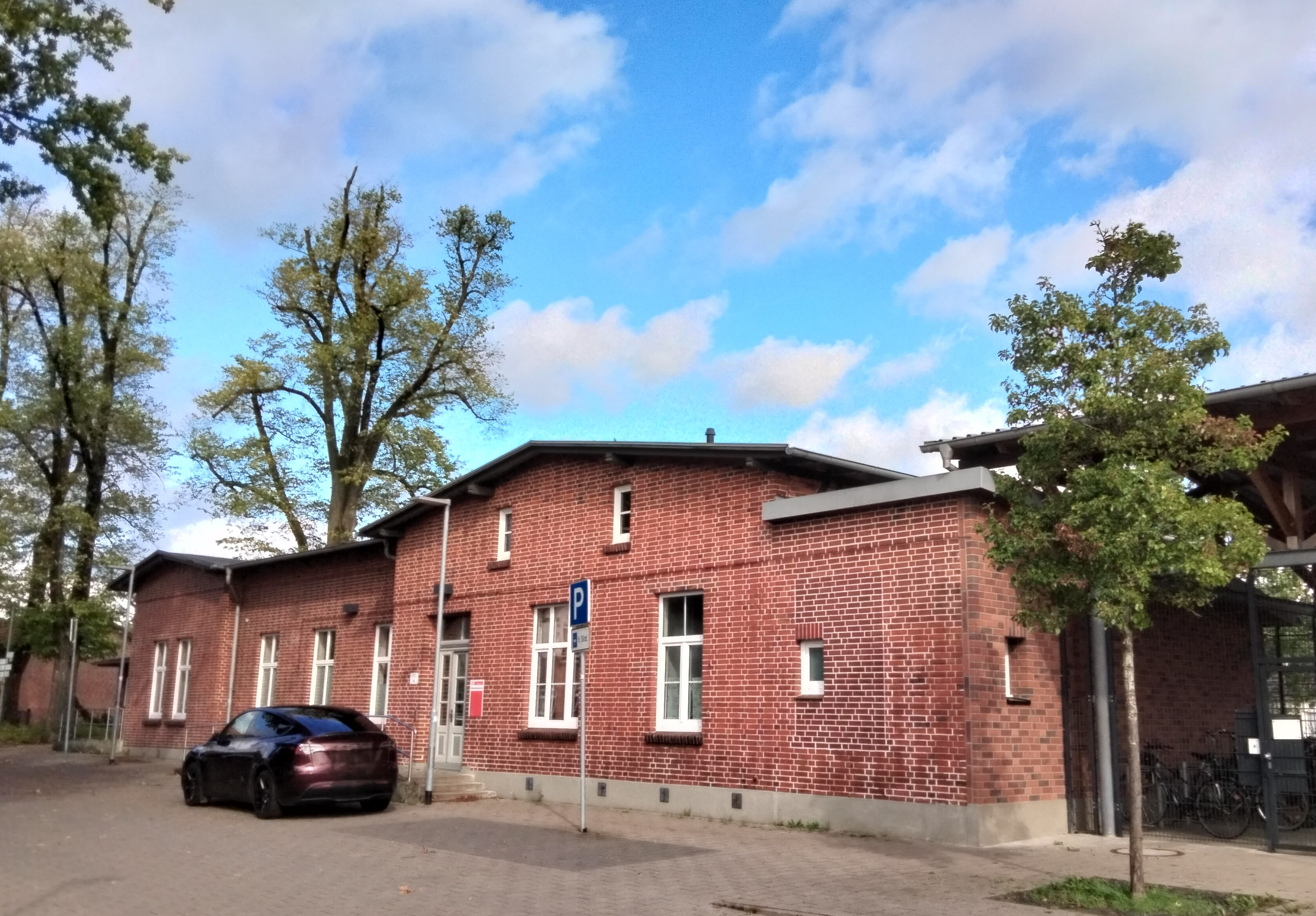
Railway Station

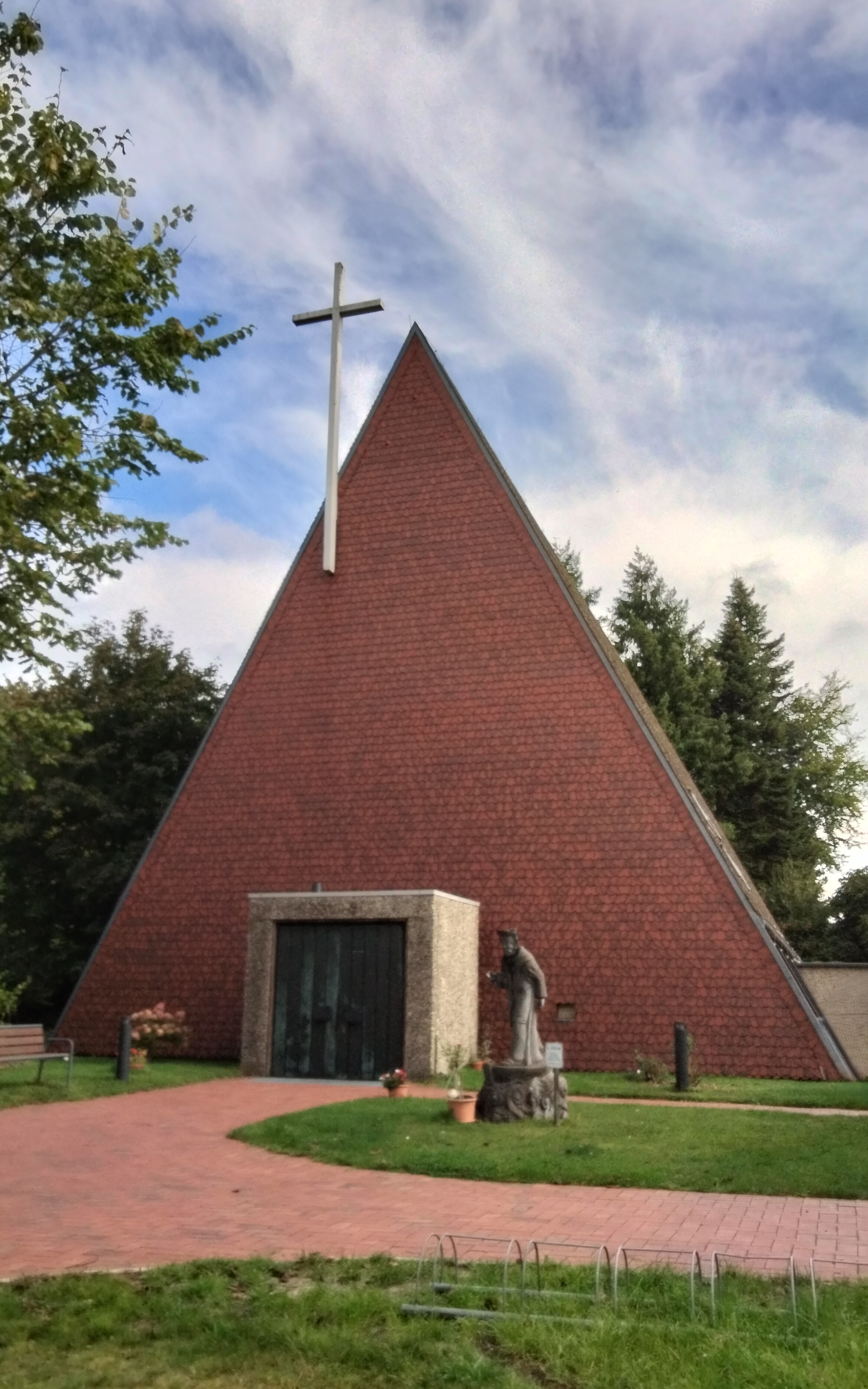
Saint Ansgar Church

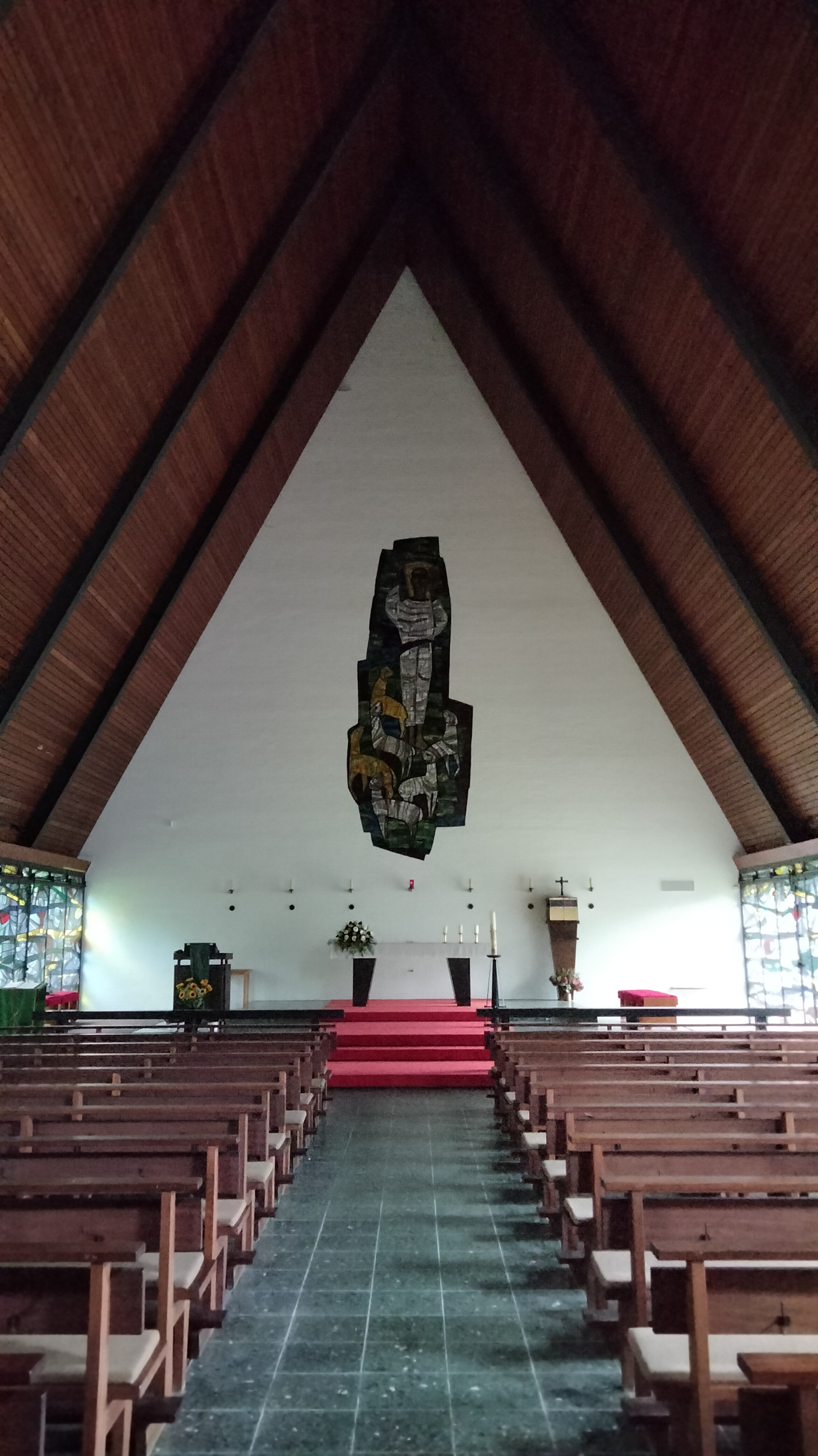
Saint Ansgar Church

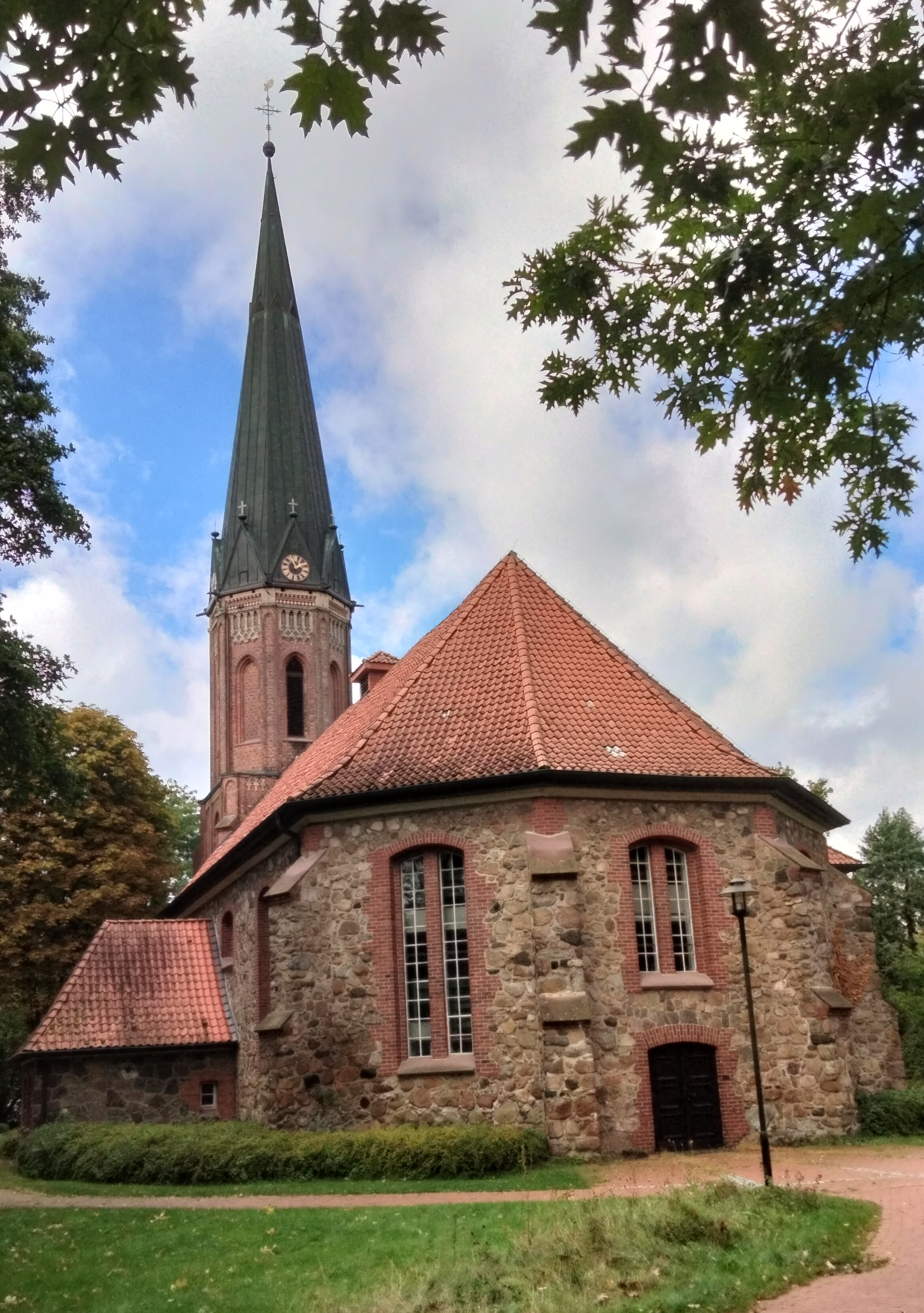
Protestant Church

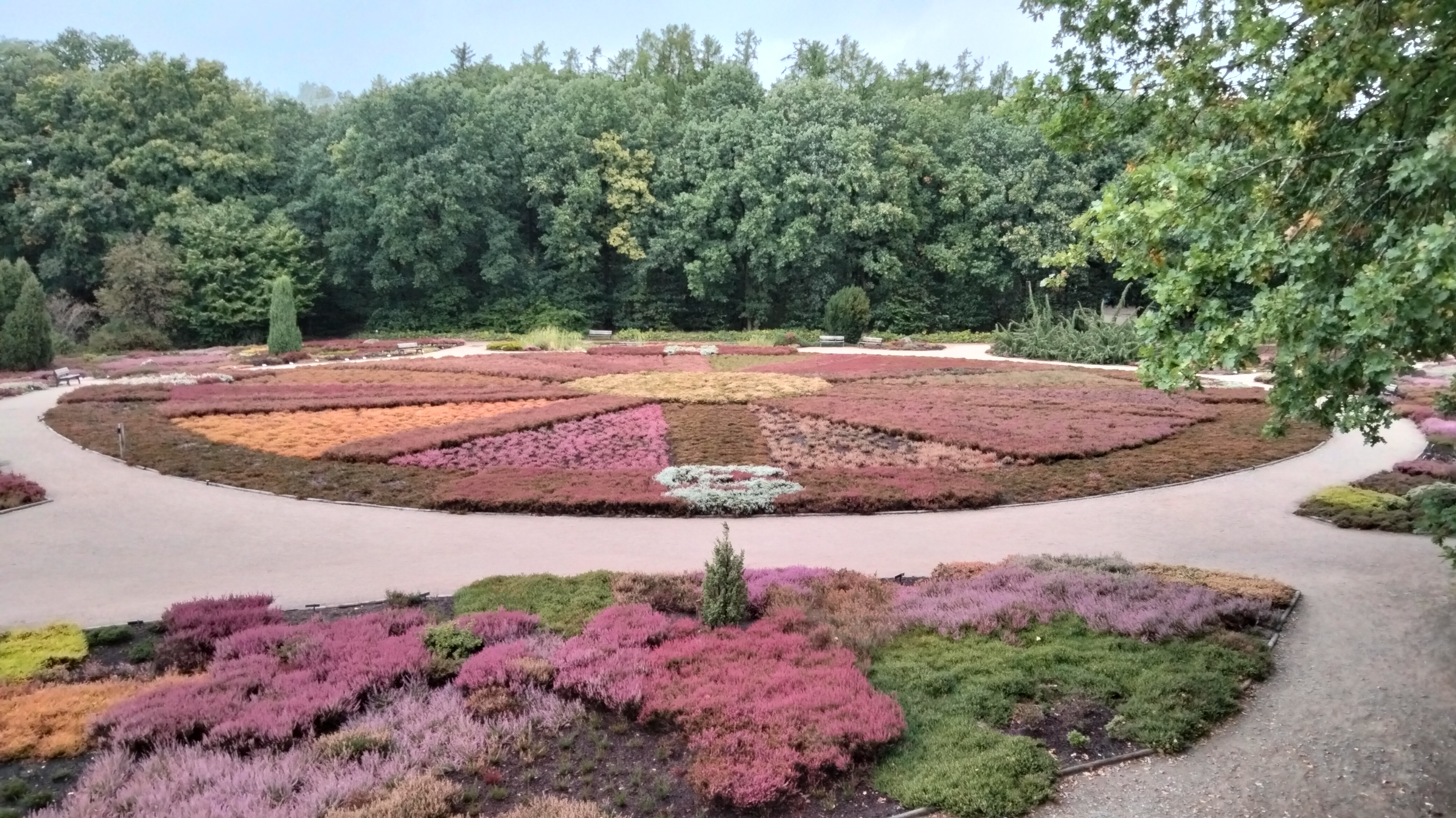
Heidegarten Park

== People ==
- Karsten Möring (born 1949), politician
