= List of castles and palaces in Lower Saxony =

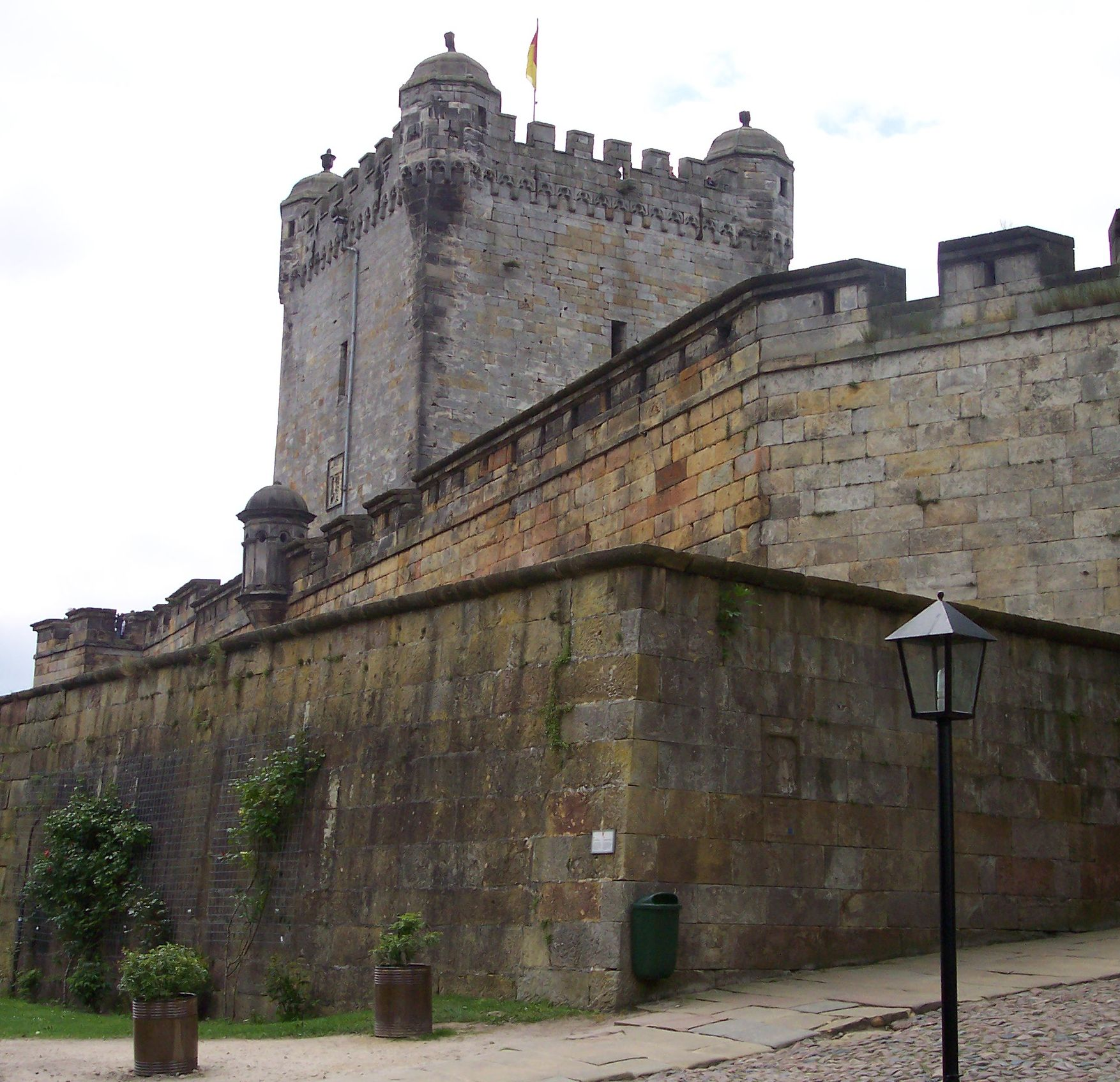
Bentheim Castle

Numerous castles and palaces are found in the German state of Lower Saxony. These buildings, some of which have a history of over 1000 years, were the setting of historical events, domains of famous personalities and are still imposing buildings to this day.

This list encompasses those structures built as fortified sites, usually described in German as a Burg (castle or manor house) or Festung (fort/fortress), as well as those built primarily as aristocratic residences - stately homes and palaces - usually referred to in German as a Schloß or Palais/Palast.

== Castles and palaces ==
- Agathenburg House, Agathenburg
- Ahlden House, Ahlden
- Alte Burg, Osterode am Harz
- Adelebsen Castle, Adelebsen
- Ampleben Castle, Kneitlingen
- Jagdschloss Baum, Bückeburg
- Bederkesa Castle, Bad Bederkesa
- Beningaburg, Dornum
- Bredebeck House, Lohheide
- Bentheim Castle, Bad Bentheim
- Bevern Castle, Bevern
- Blankenburg Castle, Essel
- Blankenhagen Castle, Grethem
- Bodenwerder Castle, Bodenwerder (Baron von Münchhausen)
- Bramburg, Hann. Münden
- Brunswick Palace, Brunswick
- Bückeburg Castle, Bückeburg
- Bunkenburg, Ahlden
- Calenberg Castle, near Schulenburg
- Campen Castle, Flechtorf
- Celle Castle, Celle
- Coppenbrügge Castle, Coppenbrügge
- Dankern Castle, Haren (Ems)
- Dinklage Castle, Dinklage
- Dannsee Castle, Beckdorf
- Dankwarderode Castle, Brunswick
- Diepholz Castle, Diepholz
- Erichsburg, Dassel
- Essenrode Manor, Essenrode
- Evenburg, Leer
- Everstein Castle, Polle
- Fallersleben Castle, Wolfsburg-Fallersleben
- Frauenstein Castle, Bad Lauterberg
- Freudenthal Ruins, Uslar
- Gifhorn Castle, Gifhorn
- Burg Gleichen, Appenrode
- Gleichen, Göttingen
- Gödens Castle, Neustadtgödens, Sande
- Greene Castle, Greene
- Grubenhagen Castle, near Einbeck
- Hagenburg Castle, Hagenburg
- Haneburg, Leer
- Hardenberg Castle, Nörten-Hardenberg
- Harderwykenburg, Leer
- Harzburg, Bad Harzburg
- Heldenburg, Einbeck
- Ruins of Heisterburg, Bad Nenndorf
- Heisterschlösschen, Beckedorf
- Herrenhausen Castle, Hanover
- Herzberg Castle, Herzberg am Harz
- Hodenhagen Castle, Hodenhagen
- Holter Burg, Bissendorf
- Homburg, Stadtoldendorf
- Hornburg Castle, Hornburg
- Hoya Castle, Hoya
- Hünenburg, Bad Pyrmont
- Hünenburg, Rinteln
- Hünnefeld Castle, Bad Essen
- Hülsede Water Castle, Hülsede
- Iburg Castle and Benedictine Abbey, Bad Iburg
- Ippenburg Castle, Bad Essen
- Jever Castle, Jever
- Kukesburg, Springe
- Landestrost Castle, Neustadt am Rübenberge
- Leine Castle, Hanover
- Lauenstein Castle, on the Ith above Lauenstein, Hameln-Pyrmont
- Burg Lichtenberg, Salzgitter
- Castle ruins of Lichtenstein, Osterode am Harz
- Lutter Castle, Lutter am Barenberge
- Lütetsburg Castle, Lütetsburg
- Manningaburg, Pewsum
- Marienburg Castle, Hildesheim
- Marienburg Castle, Pattensen
- Fort Mariensiel, Wilhelmshaven
- Neuhaus Castle, Wolfsburg-Neuhaus
- Schloss Norderburg, Dornum
- Schloss Oldenburg, Oldenburg
- Oelber Castle, Oelber am weißen Wege
- Osnabrück Castle
- Osterburg, Groothusen, East Frisia
- Petersburg, Osnabrück
- Plesse Castle, Bovenden/Göttingen
- Rastede Castle, Rastede
- Ringelheim Castle and Park, Salzgitter
- Ritzebüttel Castle, Cuxhaven
- Salder Castle, Salzgitter
- Schaumburg, Rinteln
- Scharzfels Castle, Herzberg am Harz
- Schloss Bredebeck, see Bredebeck House
- Schloss Richmond, Brunswick
- Sichelnstein Castle, Sichelnstein
- Siebethsburg, Wilhelmshaven
- Söder Castle, Holle
- Stadthagen Castle, Stadthagen
- Steuerwald Castle, Hildesheim
- Uhlenburg, Essel
- Warberg Castle, Warberg
- Castle ruins of Warburg, Warberg
- Winsen Castle, Winsen (Luhe)
- Stiftsburg Wittlage, Wittlage
- Welf Castle, Hanover
- Wendhausen Castle, Wendhausen
- Wilhelmstein Fortress, Steinhude
- Winzenburg Castle, Winzenburg
- Wohldenberg Castle, Sillium
- Wolfenbüttel Castle, Wolfenbüttel
- Wolfsburg Castle, Wolfsburg

== See also ==
- List of castles
- List of castles in Germany
