= Blankenhagen Castle =

Lowland castle in Germany

- Burg Blankenhagen
- Near Grethem, Lower Saxony, Germany
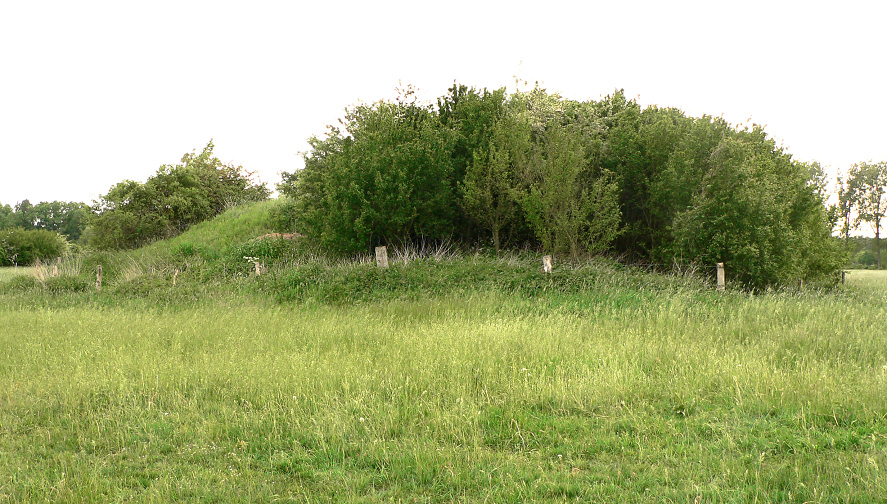
- Main motte of the former castle

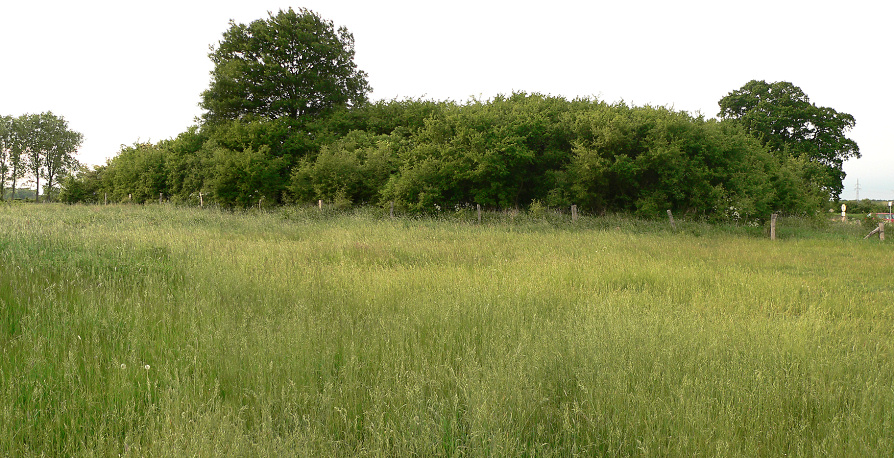
- The triangular secondary motte

Site information
- Type: Lowland castle (Niederungsburg); motte-and-bailey
- Open to the public: Yes

Location
- Coordinates: 52°43′49″N 9°35′05″E

Site history
- Built: c. 1200
- Built by: Lords of Blankenhagen

Blankenhagen Castle (German: Burg Blankenhagen) was a lowland castle (Niederungsburg), whose ruins are located by the River Aller near Grethem in Lower Saxony, Germany. The motte-and-bailey castle is believed to have been built around 1200. It is supposed that there used to be fortified buildings on the two low mounds or mottes, and that a bailey was constructed on an outer island-like area.

== Location ==
The castle stood in the meadow landscape of the Aller valley about half a kilometre northeast of Grethem. It lies today between the Old Leine (200 m west) and Aller (400 m east) rivers. It is accessible via a track that leads to the ferry crossing over the Aller to Eickeloh.

== Description ==
Of the two preserved castle mounds, which are devoid of any stone ruins, the higher one has a diameter today of about 25 m. It is roughly 4.5 m high and covered by bushes. The mound is surrounded by a hollow which may have been the old, inner ditch. About 40 m further northeast is another artificially built mound. It is triangular in shape and is about 30 m long. It has a height of 3 m and is also covered in bushes.

Both mounds were surrounded by a circular rampart, which has only partly survived. It has a present-day height of around 1.3 m and a width of 13 m. In front is a hollow that was probably the outer ditch. In the immediate vicinity of the castle it has been established that there was an island-like elevation, on which a bailey could have been located.

The castle site appears in the Royal Hanoverian Map Series (Kurhannoversche Landesaufnahme) of 1779. It is still present in Prussian mapping (Preußische Neuaufnahme) around 1900 shown as a semi-circular rampart.

== Archaeological Research ==
The site was added to the list of cultural monuments in 2002 and in 2004 a more detailed inspection was carried out. This included a magnetic survey, aerial photography and the production of a digital relief model. In 2005 security measures were taken on the main motte, which had suffered from damage as a result of cattle grazing.

== History ==
The castle is not mentioned in the records. It is thought to have been founded by the lords of Blankena (Blankenhagen), who were closely related to those of Hodenberg. The lords of Blankenhagen were mentioned in the 13th century in connexion with Hodenhagen Castle. Their line seems to have soon died out however.

== Similar fortifications in the local area ==
Within the neighbourhood, in the valley of the Aller, there is a number of other medieval castles, some of similar design. These fortifications include those in Bierde, Ahlden (Bunkenburg), Essel (Uhlenburg) (Blankenburg Castle), Hodenhagen (Hodenhagen Castle) and Rethem.

Blankenhagen belongs to the group of former castles, that were researched between 2003-2005 by the Burgenlandschaft Aller-Leine-Tal (B.A.L.T.) project. The project was supported by the European aid programme LEADER+, because it had located castle sites in the Aller-Leine Valley area.

== Literature ==
- Burgen im Fluss, Herausgeber: Landkreis Soltau-Fallingbostel, Bad Fallingbostel, 2005, ISBN 3-00-017281-5
