= Uhlenburg =

Castle in Lower Saxony, Germany

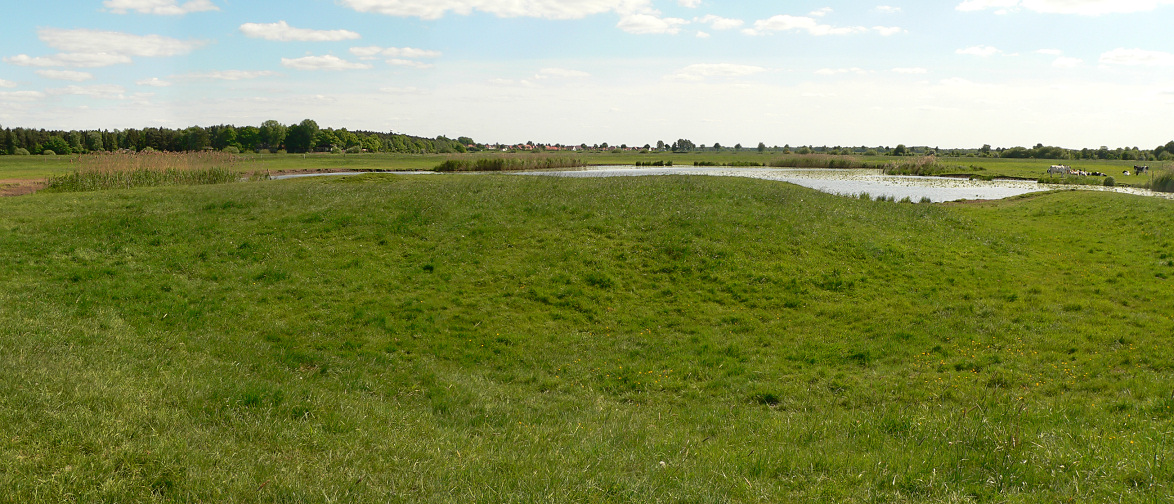
Hill of the main part of the castle. Right: the rampart

Uhlenburg is the site (Burgstall) of a lowland castle that was built in the 14th century close to the River Aller near Essel in the German state of Lower Saxony. This Late Middle Ages aristocratic seat only existed for a few decades towards the end of the 14th century and was destroyed by force in 1393/94.

== Location ==
The castle site lies roughly a kilometre east of Essel and about 1 km north of Buchholz (Aller) in the flood plain of the Aller valley at a height of 25 m above N.N. The site is located in a loop of the river, about 250 m from the Aller itself. The former castle terrain, like the rest of the wide valley is extensively used as pasture.

== Description ==
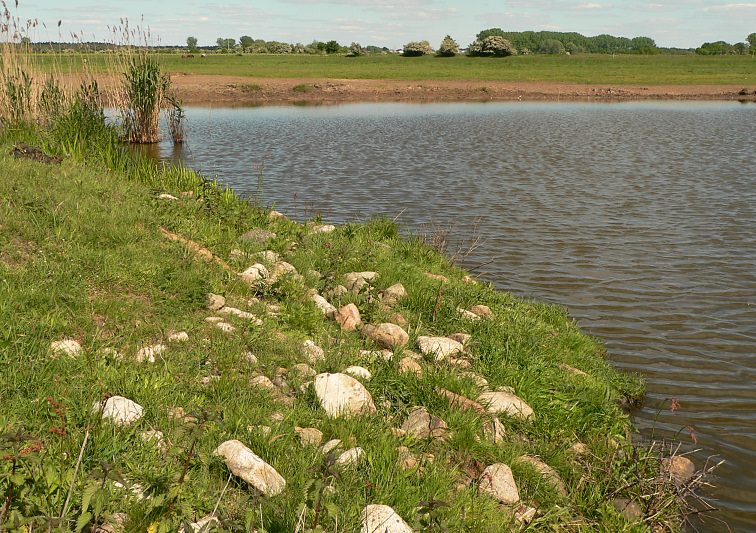
Southern slope of the keep by the present-day pond. 2004 stone reinforcement to prevent erosion

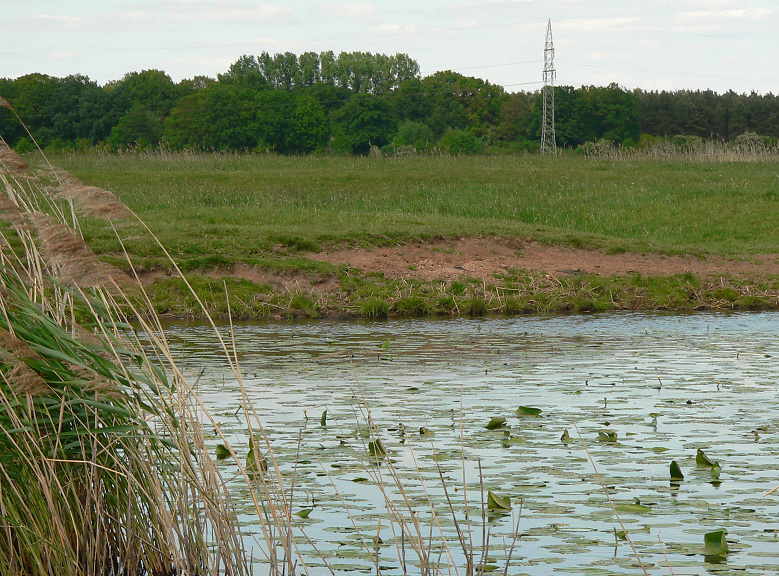
Erosion on a section of the rampart

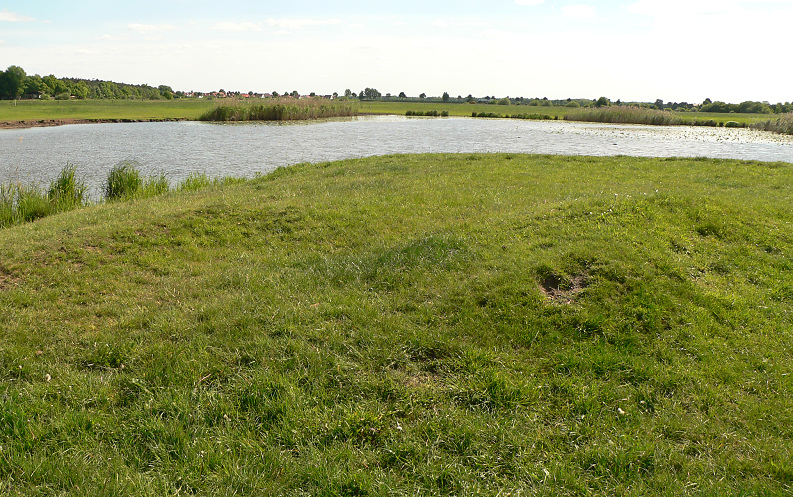
Uneven ground on the motte

Uhlenburg consisted of a small inner ward and a large outer ward that adjoined its northern side. The almost square inner bailey was built on a motte with sides some 30 metres long. Today it only has a height of about 1.5 metres and a pond borders it to the south. In 2004 the banks of the pond were reinforced with stones to prevent erosion. West of the motte a rampart guards the ditch. The entire complex was surrounded by a castle ditch and it is possible that the two wards were on islands surrounded by a large area of water. On the eastern side of the motte is a flat depression on an area of 11 x 20 m. An embankment runs from here across the ditch, so it can be assumed that this was the entrance. In the pond a row of stakes was found that belonged to the old castle and could have been part of a palisade.

The terrain of the outer bailey is slightly raised above the surrounding lowland. It is roughly 100 m long and up to 40 m wide. The whole castle site is surrounding by a narrow stretch of water, which in the west and north could have been a loop in the old course of the Aller.

== Archaeological excavations ==
It is probable that the first, apparently rather amateurish, excavations on the castle site took place in 1906. This unearthed a number of iron objects, including a chain. In 1926 excavations were carried out by a teacher and his pupil. According to the records the debris of a building was found in the area of the keep but no plan could be established. The find included pieces of brick, clay, boulders, pieces of pottery and bones. Particularly interesting was the presence of charcoal everywhere, which led to the conclusion that the castle was destroyed by a fire.

In 2001 the castle site attracted strong interest from archaeologists due to the well-preserved state of its ruins. Since then a comprehensive investigation has been carried out. This included physical inspections of the site, a magnetic survey, ground resistance measurements and aerial photography. The results showed that the earth mound of the motte conceals a layer of rubble. Wooden stakes found in the wet soil underground were submitted for dendrochronological dating and found to date from around 1370–1380. Other finds during the ground inspections were shards of pottery and pieces of roof tile. One exceptional find was the discovery of a seal stamp made of a lead-tin alloy which portrayed the coat of arms of the lords of Hademstorf as the former lords of the castle.

In spite of intensive surveying, a more recent excavation has not been carried out and is not planned. The historic monument can be reserved for future research as the conditions in the wet valley of the Aller are ideal for its preservation.

== History ==
The owners of the castle were the lords of Hademstorf, whose family line was first mentioned in 1237. In 1372 the brothers Bruno, Johann and Heinrich were recorded as lords of Hademsdorf. Uhlenburg was mentioned in a deed dated 1394. In this, the lords of Hademsdorf complained to the Lüneburg district administrator (Landrat), that the Dukes of Brunswick-Lüneburg Henry I and Bernard I had destroyed Uhlenburg, an act which contravened the Lüneburg Treaty (Lüneburger Sate). Presumably the dukes were attacking the local nobility in order to extend their territory and gain control over the toll sites on the Aller. According to the deed the keep and two ladies chambers were destroyed; other buildings had been saved. In 1410, after his imprisonment, Heinrich von Hademsdorf swore an oath of truce (Urfehde) with Henry I. It is not known if the imprisonment was connected with the destruction of Uhlenburg.

== Similar fortifications in the local area ==
Within the neighbourhood, in the valley of the Aller, there is a number of other medieval castles, some of similar design. These fortifications include those in Bierde, Ahlden (Bunkenburg), Essel (Blankenburg Castle), Hodenhagen (Hodenhagen Castle), Rethem and Grethem (Blankenhagen Castle).

Uhlenburg belongs to the group of former castles, that were researched between 2003 and 2005 by the Burgenlandschaft Aller-Leine-Tal (B.A.L.T.) project. The project was supported by the European aid programme LEADER+, because it had located castle sites in the Aller-Leine Valley area.

== Literature ==
- Burgen im Fluss, Herausgeber: Landkreis Soltau-Fallingbostel, Bad Fallingbostel, 2005, ISBN 3-00-017281-5
