= Hodenhagen Castle =

Former castle in Germany

Coordinates: 52°45′17″N 9°37′07″E

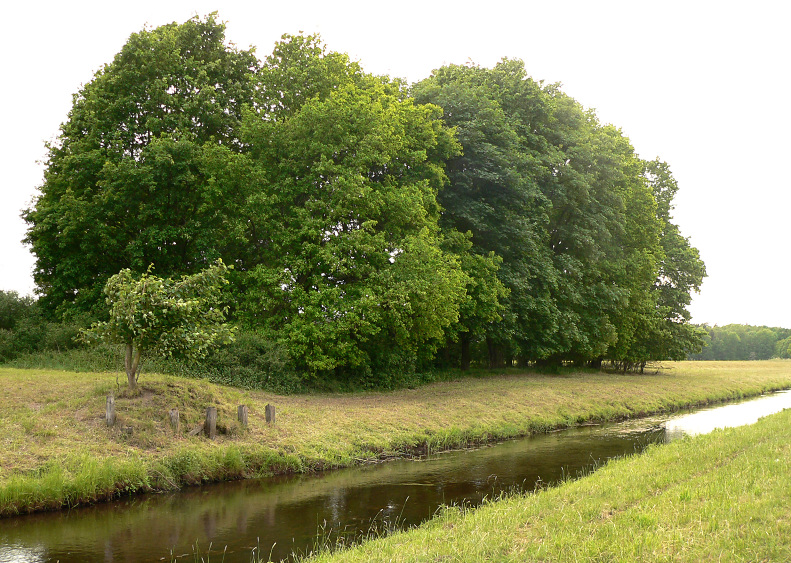
Site of the former castle grounds in a copse by the River Meiße

Hodenhagen Castle (German: Burg Hodenhagen) is the site (Burgstall) of a former lowland castle (Niederungsburg) built in the 13th century in the vicinity of Hodenhagen in the German state of Lower Saxony. This medieval manor house only lasted just under 100 years and was destroyed in 1289.

== Location ==
The castle was situated in an uninhabited region by the important river crossing of the old post road over the River Meiße. Today the site of the castle is just a few metres from the entrance to the Serengeti Park, half in a small copse and half in farmland.

== Description ==
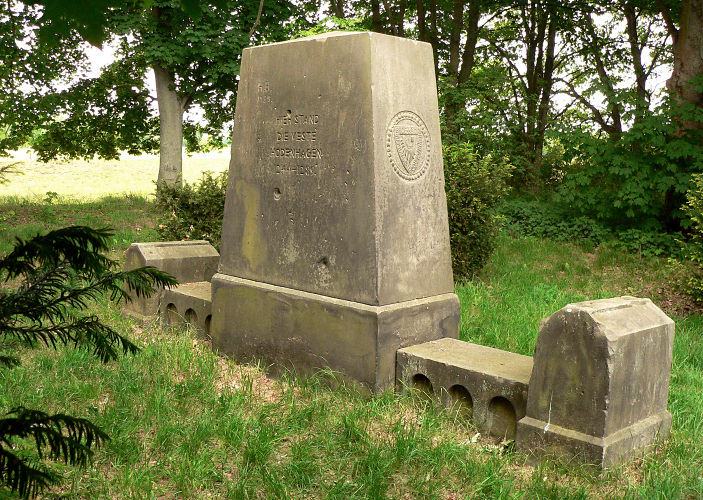
1856 monument to the old castle

We have an idea of the former appearance of the castle site from a sketch drawn by Wilhelm von Hodenberg in the middle of the 19th century. At that time the last remnants of the castle - the earth ramparts, moats and stone ruins - were levelled or removed. According to the sketch the castle had an oval rampart, 109 x 95 m in diameter, which bordered immediately on the Meiße. The rampart was originally surrounded by a moat that was filled by water from the river. At the time the sketch was drawn, a farm track already cut through the ramparts to the interior. Within the ramparts was the foundation of a round bergfried with a 10 m diameter and an outside wall, 2.5 m thick. The bases of other walls were identified at other locations inside the ramparts.

Near the castle site Wilhelm von Hodenberg believed he had located a farmyard with a smithy, because he had found pieces of iron and slag. In addition the records show there was a castle mill on the Meiße as well as a historical castle chapel, the sites of which have not been identified.

In 1856 the von Hodenberg family commemorated the castle by erecting a monument which is located on the old castle site in the small copse.

== History ==
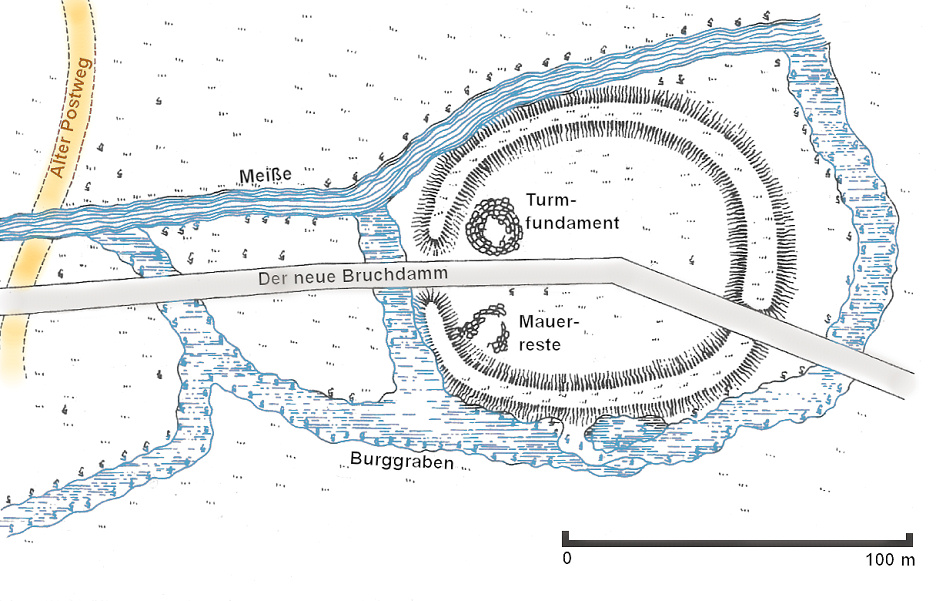
Diagram of the location showing the ruins of the castle in the mid 19th century

The castle belonged to the von Hodenbergs, who were an important aristocratic family in the region. After they had been forced by the counts of Hoya to move their seat from Altenbücken in about 1200, they built Hodenhagen Castle on the Meiße about 30 kilometres (19 mi) further west. It is thought to have been built around 1200, but the castle is first mentioned in 1244.

Based at Hodenhagen Castle, the land of the aristocratic von Hodenberg family lay geographically and relationally between that of the counts of Hoya and the House of Welf who were pushing westwards. The Welf Duke, Otto the Strict, had Hodenhagen Castle destroyed in 1289 by slighting. In a deed dated 27 August 1289 he had had it assigned to him from Heinrich von Hodenberg. In this manner the Hodenberg family became subjected to the Duke and lost their regional authority; instead they became vassals of the Welfs. It is thought that the destruction of the castle also served to contain the widespread activities of the robber barons, that permeated the lower strata of the nobility at that time.

After the destruction of Hodenhagen Castle the family line moved its seat further west to the present-day Hodenhagen hamlet of Hudemühlen. There they built a manor house with defensive features, that formed the basis for the village of Hodenhagen established in 1400. Not until 1448 was the court of the von Hodenbergs described in the records as a castle (Schloss). The building was converted in the 16th century into the splendid, renaissance castle of Hudemühlen, that was demolished in the 19th century.

== Similar fortifications in the local area ==
Within the neighbourhood, in the valley of the Aller, there is a number of other medieval castles, some of similar design. These fortifications include those in Bierde, Ahlden (Bunkenburg), Essel (Uhlenburg) (Blankenburg Castle), Rethem and Grethem (Blankenhagen Castle).

Hodenhagen Castle belongs to the group of former castles, that were researched between 2003-2005 by the Burgenlandschaft Aller-Leine-Tal (B.A.L.T.) project. The project was supported by the European aid programme LEADER+, because it had located castle sites in the Aller-Leine Valley area. However Hodenhagen Castle was only studied by aerial photography; no excavations have been carried out to date.

== Literature ==
- Burgen im Fluss, Herausgeber: Landkreis Soltau-Fallingbostel, Bad Fallingbostel, 2005, ISBN 3-00-017281-5
