= Bunkenburg =

Coordinates: 52°45′41″N 9°33′31″E

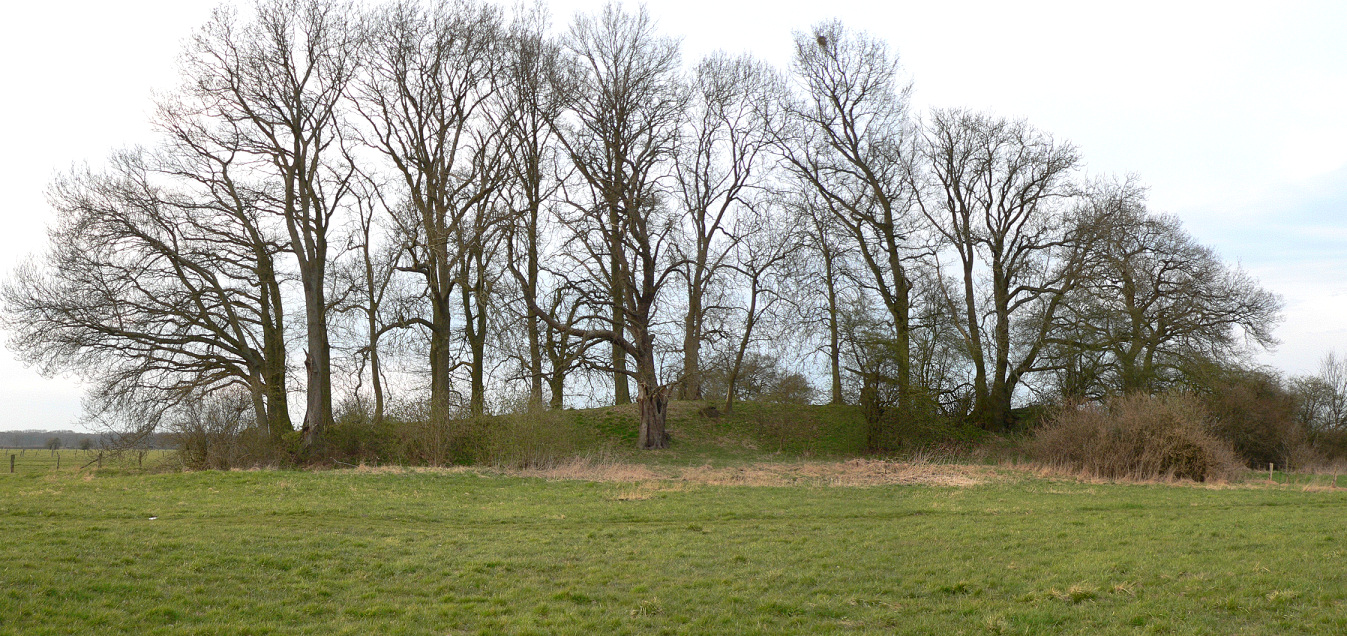
Section of the circular rampart, the only still visible remnant of the castle of Bunkenburg

Bunkenburg was a castle built during the 13th and 14th centuries in the shape of a circular fort located on the banks of the Aller opposite Ahlden in north Germany. Only a section of the rampart, roughly 60 metres long and 3 metres high, exists today. The name of the castle is probably derived from the material, bog iron, used for its construction and known in common parlance as Bunke.

== Location ==
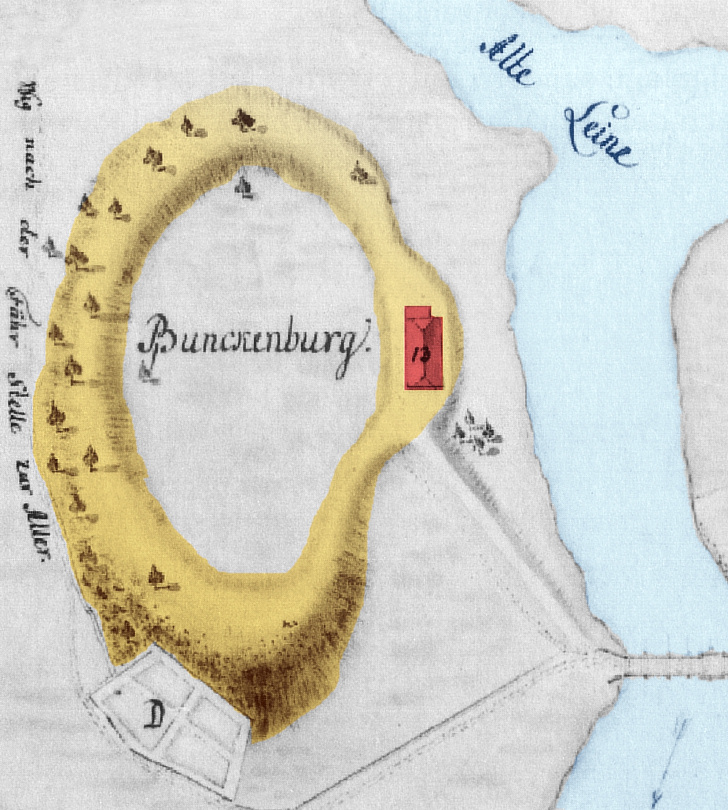
1747 plan of the circular fort on the old branch of the river Leine. In red is the prince's brewery built around 1700 on the rampart

The castle lay on the northern river bank of the Aller on a flat elevation by an important medieval crossing. The river has changed its course over the centuries becoming the River Leine and today forms the branch known as the Old Leine (Altarm Alte Leine). Opposite the site of the old castle on the other side of the river is Ahlden House (Schloss Ahlden) and the village of Ahlden. The fortification was built in the glacial valley of the Aller. Since the 1980s it has been bisected by a state road.

== Description ==
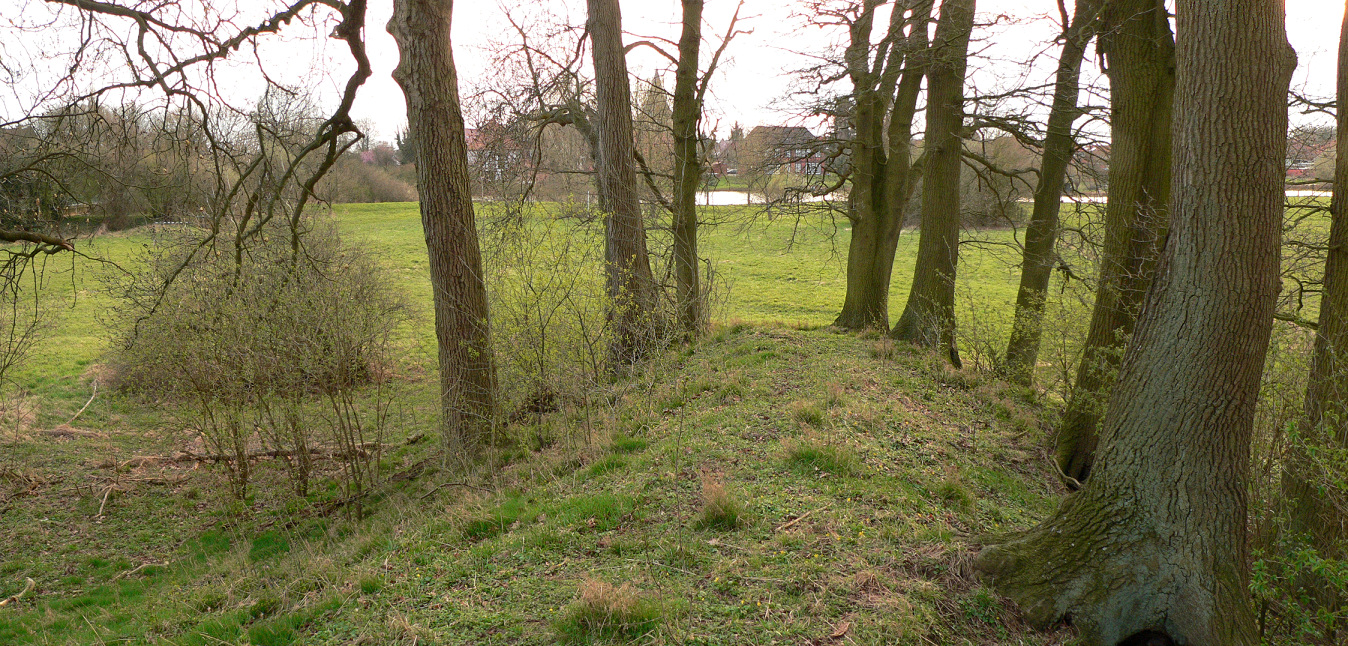
View from the rampart towards Ahlden and the Leine river branch

The castle site consists of an oval rampart, about 150 metres across. Today just a section of it remains, about 60 metres long, 20 metres wide and 3 metres high. It is covered with tall trees and lies north of the road. The rampart is likely to have originally been a wood and earth construction about 4 metres in height. There are no longer any ruins within the rampart; they were probably carted away in the 17th century to be used for the construction of Ahlden Castle. From the plan it appears not to have been a typical lowland castle, but more like the residence of a number of burgmannen with several manorial seats within the ramparts.

In 1700, long after the demise of Bunkenburg, a brewery was built on the southern section of the rampart by the prince's household. Not privatised until the 19th century it served as a drinks business until the middle of the 20th century. Today it is a private residence.

== Excavations ==
As a result of plans to build a road through the middle of the castle site, archaeological excavations took place in 1976 and 1982. These uncovered moats and a post hole. The pottery that was discovered was dated to the 13th and 14th century. Inside the rampart shards of pottery from the 9th to the 11th century were also found along with evidence of a storage building. This could have been related to Old Ahlden (Alt Ahlden) recorded in 1295, which fell into ruin and whose remains may later have been used to build the castle ramparts.

== History ==
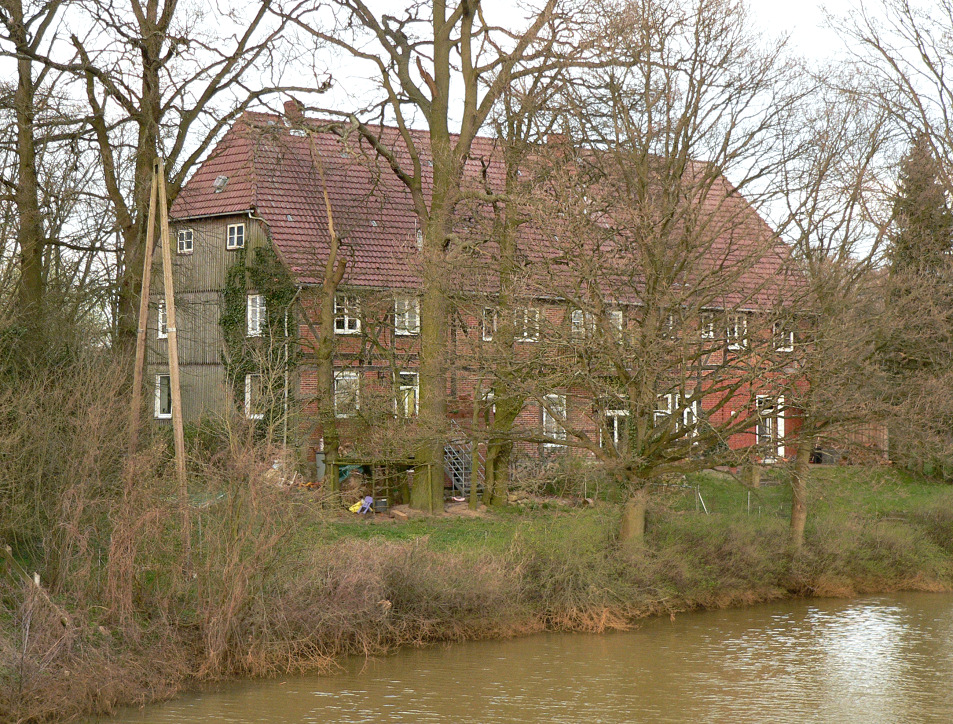
Old brewery on the castle rampart, today a residential home

The emergence of the castle needs to be seen in connexion with the westward expansion of the rule of the Principality of Lüneburg in the 14th century. At that time Ahlden was the part of the estate of the Bishopric of Minden. Bunkenburg was built on the state border and secured the water route of the Aller. In 1431 Ahlden was captured by the Dukes of Lüneburg.

The castle receives only scant mention in the surviving records. In 1310 low-ranking Burgmannen from the area were mentioned in connexion with it, including those from Ahlden. The knight, Johann von Escherde, is named as the Burgvogt. The last mention of the castle is in 1340. During the 14th century it apparently lost its significance and the Burgmannen moved to Rethem castle, where their family names are to be found again in the records.

== Similar fortifications in the local area ==
Within the neighbourhood, in the valley of the Aller, there is a number of other medieval castles, some of similar design. These fortifications include those in Bierde, Essel (Uhlenburg) (Blankenburg Castle), Hodenhagen (Burg Hodenhagen), Rethem and Grethem (Blankenhagen Castle).

== Literature ==
- Rainer Hendricks: Geschichte des Fleckens Ahlden an der Aller, Hrsg.:Flecken Walsrode, 2006
- Burgen im Fluss, Herausgeber: Landkreis Soltau-Fallingbostel, Bad Fallingbostel, 2005, ISBN 3-00-017281-5
