= Blankenburg Castle (Essel) =

Castle

Coordinates: 52.754854°N 9.618638°E

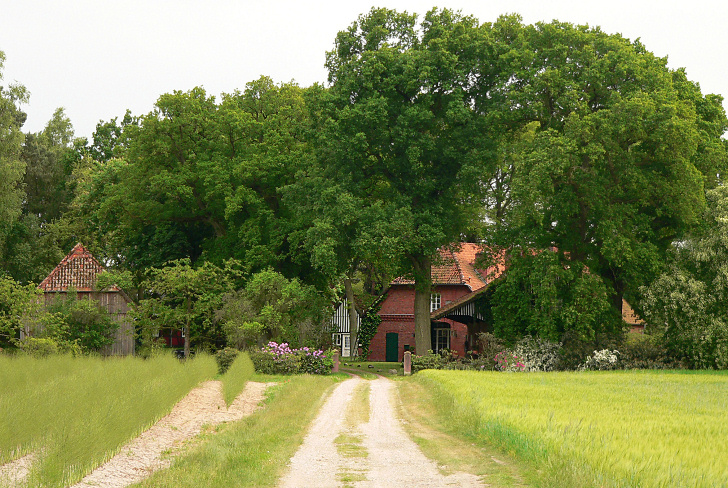
Farmstead on the site of the castle

Blankenburg Castle (German: Burg Blankenburg) was a small castle in the village of Engehausen in the municipality of Essel in the German state of Lower Saxony. It dates roughly to the 13th century. All that remains are parts of the surrounding rampart. Today a rural farmstead, formerly a manor house, stands on the site of the old castle.

The castle was built on the north bank of the river Aller above the flood plain. Today it lies on a silted-up branch of the old river. The ruins of a rampart can still be seen on the southeastern side of the former castle site; the opposite side of the embankment had been levelled around 1900. The extent of the castle has been estimated at 50 x 50 m. Today an old farmhouse stands in the middle of the site. At the beginning of the 20th century the foundations and parts of a vault were reported to have been found.

The castle was attributed to the Lords of Blankena or Blankenhagen, who were mentioned in the middle of the 13th century in the records in connexion with the Hodenhagen Castle. Their line must have soon died out however.

== Similar fortified sites in the vicinity ==
In the local area there is a number of other medieval castles in the valley of the Aller. These include fortifications in Bierde, Ahlden (Bunkenburg), Essel (Uhlenburg), Rethem, Hodenhagen (Hodenhagen Castle) and Grethem (Blankenhagen Castle).

== Sources ==
- Heine, Dr Hans Wilhelm and others, Burgen im Fluss, Landkreis Soltau-Fallingbostel, Bad Fallingbostel, 2005, ISBN 3-00-017281-5
