= Ahlden (disambiguation) =

Ahlden is a municipality in Lower Saxony, Germany. Ahlden or Ahldén may also refer to

- Ahlden (Samtgemeinde) in Lower Saxony, Germany
- Ahlden House in Lower Saxony, Germany
- Erik Ahldén (1923–2013), Swedish runner
