= Sophia Dorothea of Celle =

- Electoral Princess of Hanover; Duchess of Ahlden
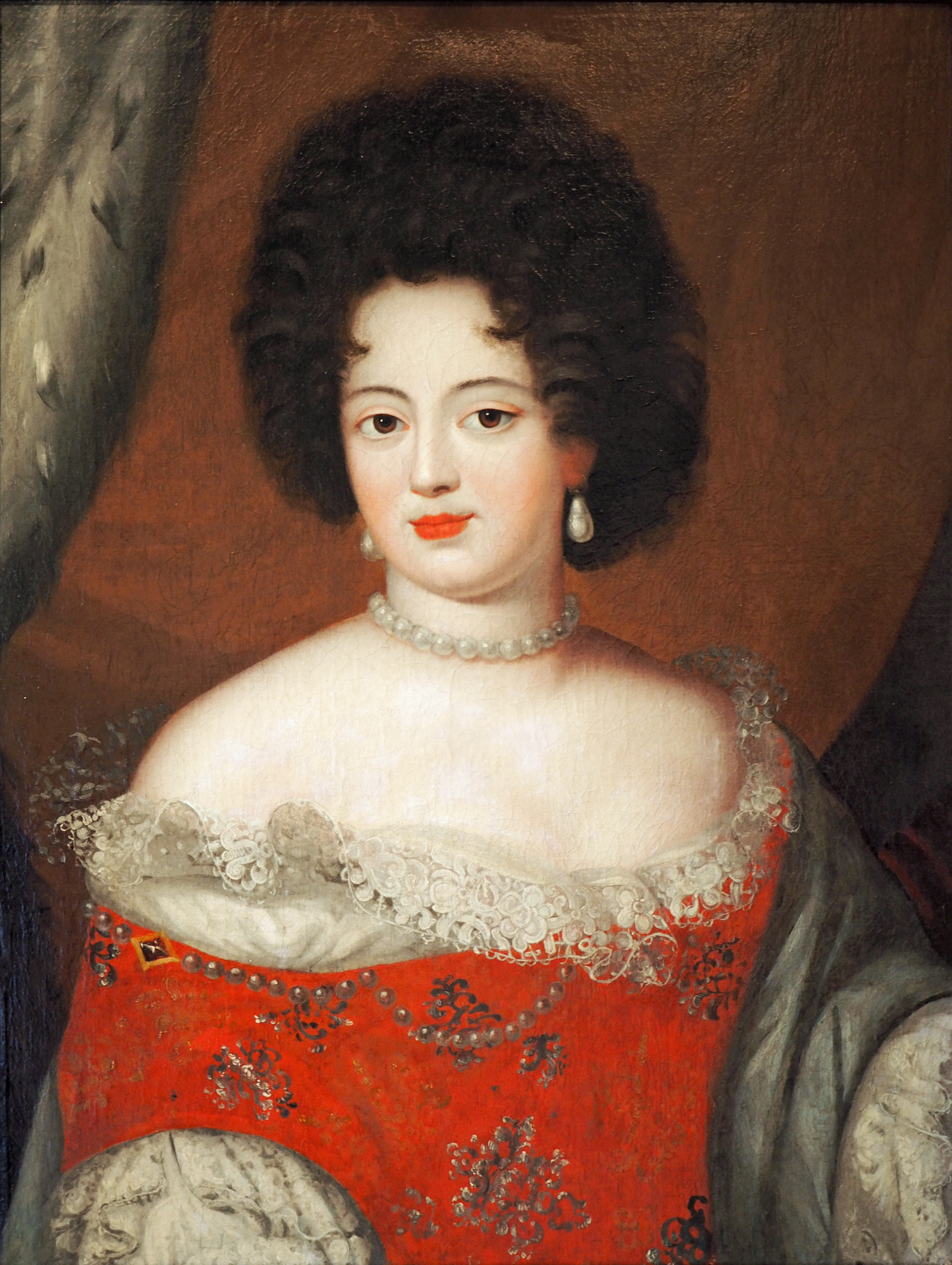
- Portrait from the 1690s. Currently displayed at the Residence Museum (Residenzmuseum) in Celle Castle.
- Born: 15 September 1666; Celle Castle, Celle, Principality of Lüneburg
- Died: 13 November 1726 (aged 60); Ahlden, Germany
- Burial: May 1727; Stadtkirche, Celle
- Spouse: George Louis, Electoral Prince of Hanover (later George I) (m. 1682; div. 1694)
- Issue: George II, King of Great Britain; Sophia Dorothea, Queen in Prussia
- House: Hanover
- Father: George William, Duke of Brunswick-Lüneburg
- Mother: Éléonore Desmier d'Olbreuse

Sophia Dorothea of Brunswick-Lüneburg-Celle (15 September 1666 – 13 November 1726) was the repudiated wife of future King George I of Great Britain. The union with George, her first cousin, was a marriage of state, arranged by her father George William, her father-in-law the Elector of Hanover, and her mother-in-law, Electress Sophia of Hanover, first cousin of King Charles II of England.

Sophia Dorothea is best remembered for her alleged affair with Count Philip Christoph von Königsmarck that led to her being imprisoned in the Castle of Ahlden for the last thirty years of her life.

== Life ==
=== Early years ===
Born in Celle on 15 September 1666, Sophia Dorothea was the only surviving daughter of George William, Duke of Brunswick-Lüneburg, by his morganatic wife Eléonore Desmier d'Olbreuse (1639–1722), Lady of Harburg, a French Huguenot noblewoman. Sophia Dorothea appears to have grown up in a carefree and loving environment.

Her father transferred large assets to her over time in order to improve her chances of being a candidate for marriage. Her status was enhanced, and her chances were further improved, when, by imperial order dated 22 July 1674, and in recognition of the military assistance given by her father to Emperor Leopold I, she and her mother received the title of Countess of Harburg and Wilhelmsburg" (Gräfin von Harburg und Wilhelmsburg) with allodial rights over those demesnes.

Sophia Dorothea's suitors included Augustus Frederick, Hereditary Prince of Brunswick-Wolfenbüttel; Frederick Charles, Duke of Württemberg-Winnental; Maximilian II Emanuel, Elector of Bavaria; and King Charles XI of Sweden. At first, her parents agreed to the marriage between Sophia Dorothea and the Hereditary Prince of Brunswick-Wolfenbüttel, who was the eldest son of their distant relative Anthony Ulrich, Duke of Brunswick-Wolfenbüttel, who had supported the love affair between George William and Éléonore from its beginning. The betrothal was signed on 20 December 1675, but the prospective groom was mortally wounded at the siege of Philippsburg on 9 August 1676.

=== Elevation of birth status and marriage ===
After the death of his daughter's fiancé, George William sought to negotiate an agreement on the inheritance of the Duchy of Lüneburg. He initially approached his younger brother Ernest Augustus, Elector of Brunswick-Lüneburg, to arrange a marriage between Sophia Dorothea and Ernest Augustus's eldest son George Louis, the future King George I of Great Britain. However, both his brother and his sister-in-law, Sophia of the Palatinate, had misgivings about the proposed match because of the circumstances of Sophia Dorothea's birth.

After the rejection of his daughter, George William decided to improve the status of Sophia Dorothea and her mother. By contract signed on 22 August 1675, and in open violation of his previous promise never to marry, George William declared that Éléonore was his lawful wife, and a second wedding ceremony was held at Celle on 2 April 1676. Ernest Augustus and Sophia stayed away from this second wedding. Twenty-two days later, on 24 April, Eléonore began to be addressed at court as Duchess of Brunswick and Sophia Dorothea became legitimate.

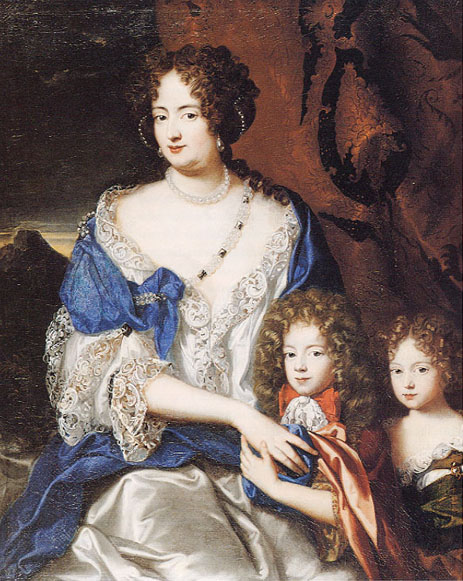
Sophia Dorothea with her two children, by Jacques Vaillant, ca. 1690–1691. Currently displayed at the Bomann-Museum in Celle.

This development alarmed George William's relatives because it appeared to threaten the planned union of the Lüneburg territories. By an agreement signed on 13 July 1680, the Lüneburg ruling family recognised Éléonore as Duchess of Brunswick and Sophia Dorothea as Princess of Brunswick-Lüneburg-Celle, with all appertaining rights of birth. George Louis's parents also agreed to the proposed union of their son with Sophia Dorothea. In the teeth of opposition from both Sophia Dorothea herself and from her mother, George William went ahead with arrangements for the wedding.

The wedding took place on 21 November 1682. The marriage was a complete failure. George Louis and his mother, Sophia of the Palatinate, felt only contempt for Sophia Dorothea, believing that her birth and manners were inferior. Explaining her reluctant support for the marriage, Duchess Sophia wrote to her niece Elizabeth Charlotte, Duchess of Orléans:

"One hundred thousand thalers a year is a goodly sum to pocket, without speaking of a pretty wife, who will find a match in my son George Louis, the most pigheaded, stubborn boy who ever lived, who has round his brains such a thick crust that I defy any man or woman ever to discover what is in them. He does not care much for the match itself, but one hundred thousand thalers a year have tempted him as they would have tempted anybody else".

George Louis treated his bride with coldness and frequently scolded her for her lack of etiquette. The two had loud and bitter arguments. Nevertheless, they managed to conceive two children: George Augustus (the future King George II of Great Britain, born on 30 October 1683) and Sophia Dorothea (the future Queen Consort in Prussia and Electress Consort of Brandenburg, born on 16 March 1687).

Having done his duty, George Louis acquired a mistress, Melusine von der Schulenburg, and started to neglect his wife. His parents asked him to be more circumspect with his mistress, fearful that disruption of the marriage would threaten the payment of the 100,000 thalers he was to receive as part of Sophia Dorothea's dowry and inheritance from her father.

=== Affair with Königsmarck ===
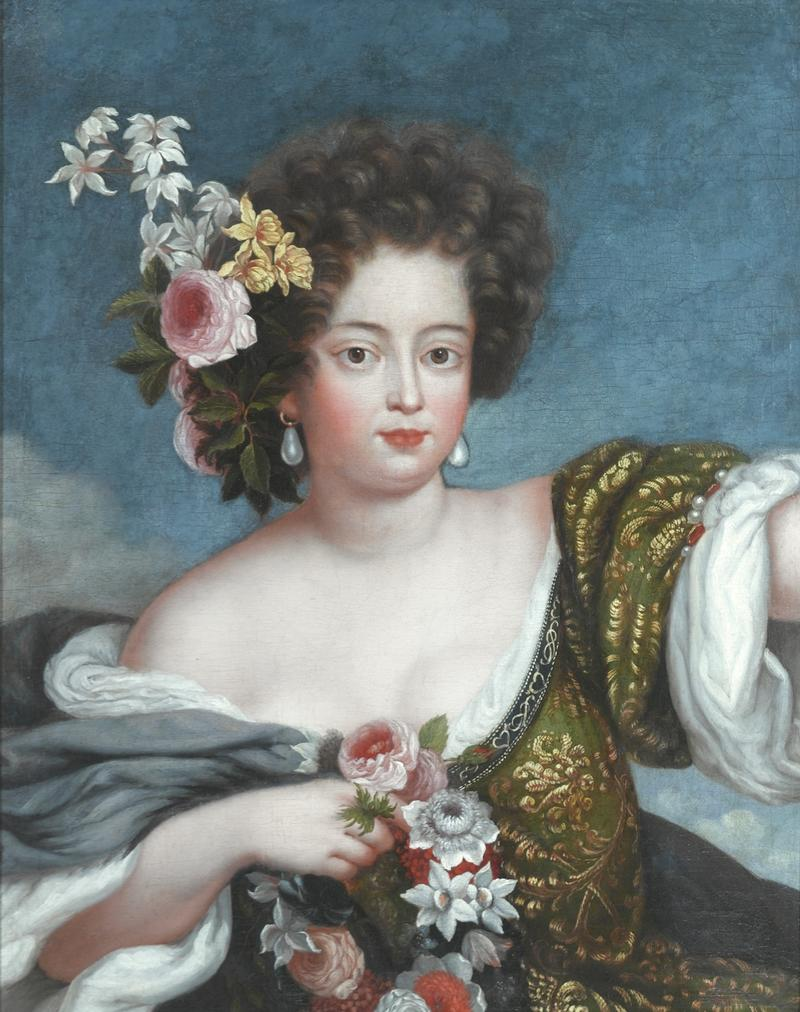
Sophia Dorothea, by Henri Gascar, 1686. Currently displayed at the Celle Castle museum.

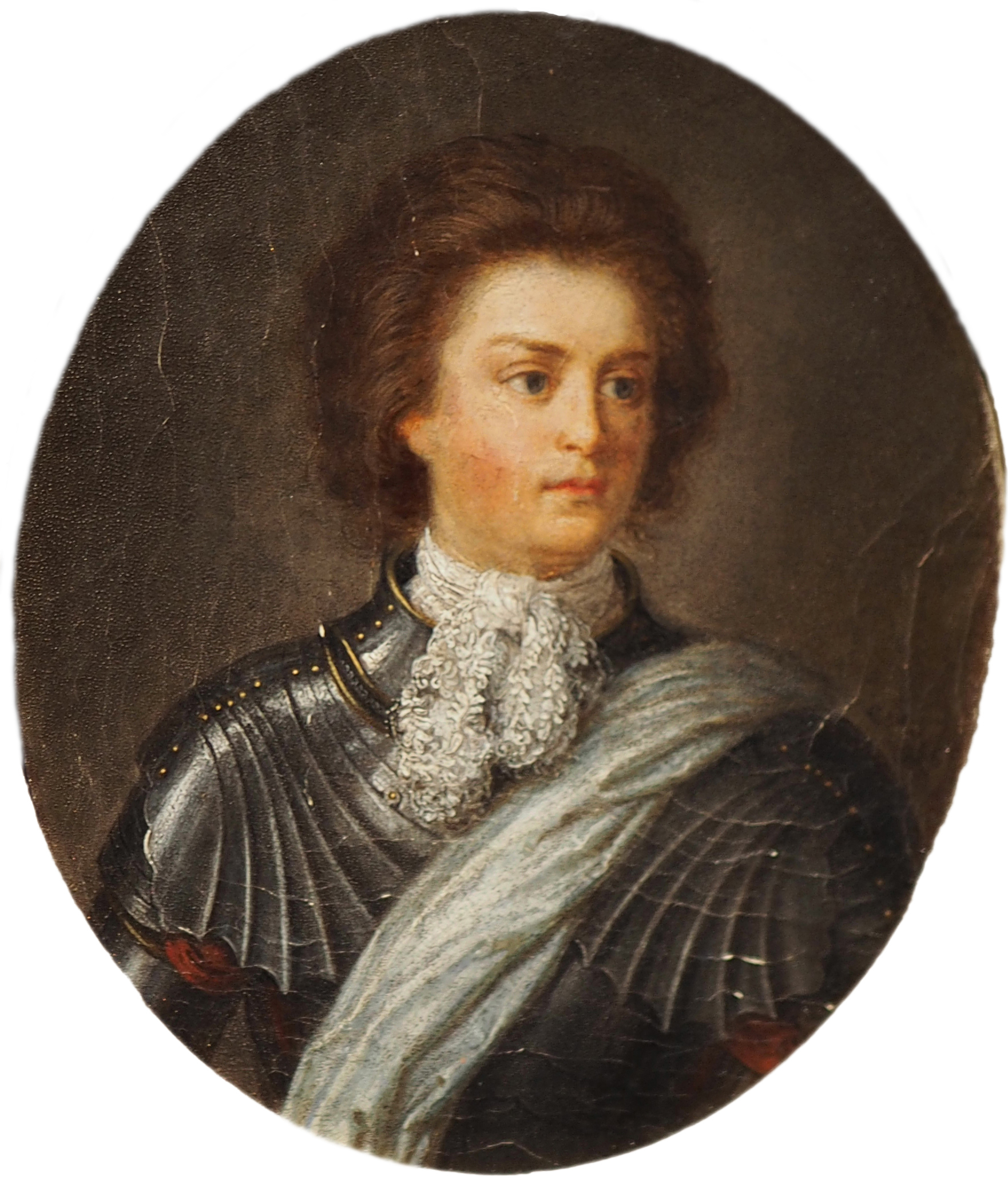
Philip Christoph von Königsmarck, anonymous portrait, ca. 1690s. Currently displayed at the Celle Castle museum.

Around 1690, Sophia Dorothea was reunited with the Swedish Count Philip Christoph von Königsmarck, whom she had known in her childhood when he was a page at the court of Celle. At first, their meetings were brief and sporadic, but this probably changed in 1691. Initially, their closeness went unnoticed, but eventually the preference that Sophia Dorothea showed for Königsmarck aroused suspicion. By 1694 rumors filled the Hanoverian court that they were having a love affair. Contemporary sources show that Sophia Dorothea and Königsmarck were presumed to have had a sexual relationship since March 1692, though she consistently denied it throughout the rest of her life.

After a violent argument with her husband, Sophia Dorothea visited her parents in Celle in the spring of 1694 in the hope of persuading them to support her official separation from her husband. George William and Eléonore opposed it, however. Sophia Dorothea's father was waging war against Denmark and Sweden, and was dependent on the help of his brother. He sent his daughter back to Hanover.

In the summer of 1694 Sophia Dorothea, together with Königsmarck and her lady in waiting Eleonore von dem Knesebeck, planned an escape, hoping to find refuge either in Wolfenbüttel, under the protection of Duke Anthony Ulrich, or in the Electorate of Saxony, where Königsmarck was a major general in the cavalry.

==== Disappearance of Königsmarck ====
Countess Clara Elisabeth von Platen, a former mistress of Elector Ernest Augustus, had tried in January 1694 to persuade Königsmarck to marry her daughter Sophia Charlotte, but he had refused. Offended, she revealed to the Electoral Prince George Louis the love affair between his wife and Königsmarck, as well as their plan to escape.

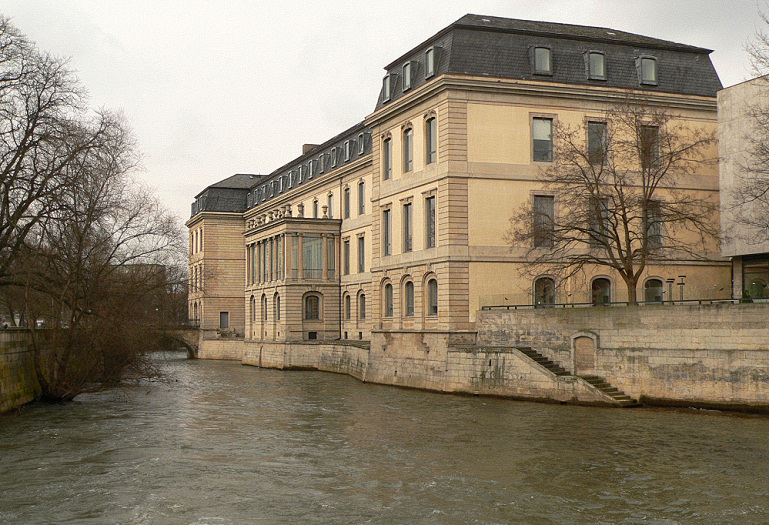
Facade of the Leineschloss next to the Leine river, into which Königsmarck's corpse was probably thrown.

On the night of 11 July 1694, after a meeting with Sophia Dorothea in the Leineschloss, Königsmarck disappeared without a trace. It appears that he was killed on the orders, tacit or direct, of George Louis or his father the Elector, and that his body, weighted with stones, was thrown into the river Leine. Four of Ernest Augustus's courtiers are said to have committed the murder, and one of them, Don Nicolò Montalbano, received 150,000 thalers, about one hundred times the annual salary of the highest-paid official. No trace of Königsmarck was ever found.

King Louis XIV of France questioned his sister-in-law Elizabeth Charlotte, a maternal first cousin of George Louis, about the murder, but she pretended ignorance. Louis then sent agents to Hanover, but they could shed no more light on the mystery than King Augustus II of Poland and Saxony, who spent weeks searching for his missing general.

Ernest Augustus and his brother George William, Sophia Dorothea's father, made a formal complaint to Emperor Leopold I against Augustus II's "unfriendly acts" and threatened to withdraw their troops from the Grand Alliance in the war against France. Both the Emperor and the Elector Frederick III of Brandenburg exerted pressure on Augustus II, but the Polish envoy continued his investigation and even told Count von Platen that Königsmarck had either been captured or killed on the orders of his wife the Countess, out of jealousy.

In 2016, construction workers installing an elevator in the Leineschloss found human bones in a pit. These were initially assumed to be Königsmarck's remains, but examination suggested that it is unlikely.

==== Love letters between Sophia Dorothea and Königsmarck ====
When his affair with Sophia Dorothea was about to become public, Königsmarck handed their love letters to his brother-in-law, the Swedish Count Carl Gustav von Löwenhaupt. The latter's heirs later offered to sell the correspondence to the House of Hanover, but they demanded such a high price that the court rejected the offer and questioned the authenticity of the letters. The correspondence was published in the middle of the 19th century. The majority of the letters are now in the possession of Lund University in Sweden, although a few ended up in the possession of Sophia Dorothea's grandson, King Frederick the Great of Prussia, after his sister, the Swedish Queen consort Louisa Ulrika, allegedly stole them and sent them to him. Today the authenticity of the letters has been established beyond any doubt.

The lovers rarely dated their letters, but they numbered most of them. The Hanoverian historian Georg Schnath calculated on the basis of the existing correspondence that there were originally 340 letters written by Königsmarck and 320 written by Sophia Dorothea. The missing letters seem to have been confiscated and destroyed by the Hanoverian authorities after the affair became public. The State Archives in Hanover provide scant information about the critical years. Even the correspondence between the Electress Sophia and her niece Elizabeth Charlotte, which might have shed some light on events, was censored afterwards.

=== Divorce and imprisonment ===
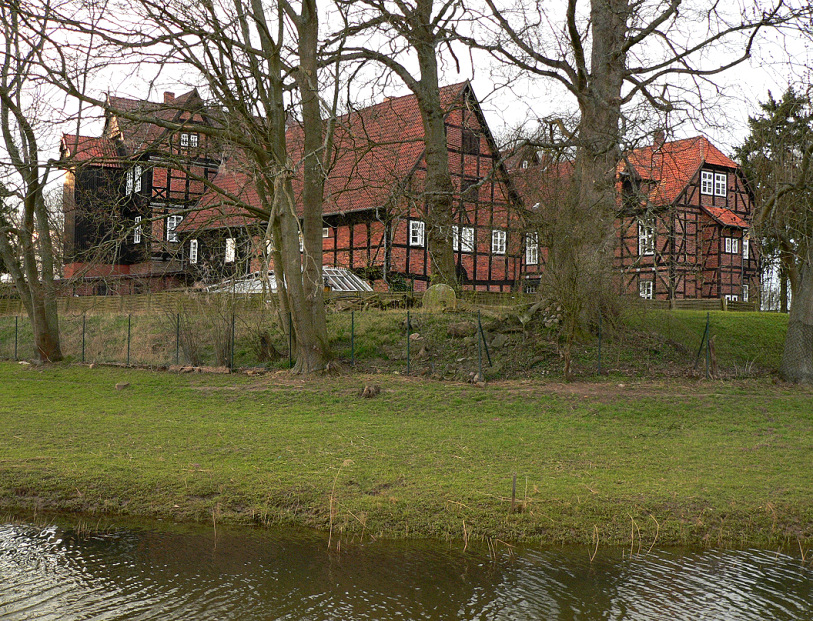
Rear of the three-winged Ahlden House with moat where Sophia was imprisoned for the last 30 years of her life

George Louis demanded a legal separation from his wife, citing her as sole culprit on grounds of desertion. During the divorce proceedings, he had Sophia Dorothea placed under arrest in Lauenau Castle. On 28 December 1694, the dissolution of the marriage was pronounced, and Sophia Dorothea was named as the guilty party for "maliciously leaving her husband". She was forbidden to remarry or to see her children again; her name was removed from official documents, she was stripped of her title of Electoral Princess, and churches in Hanover were no longer to mention her name in prayers. After the divorce, George Louis sent her to Ahlden House, a stately home on the Lüneburg Heath, which served as a prison appropriate to her status.

At the behest of her former husband and with the consent of her father, Sophia Dorothea was imprisoned for life. George Louis confiscated the assets she had brought into the marriage and allocated her an annual maintenance. She initially received 8,000 thalers for herself and her court, which was later raised to 28,000 thalers, a sum which George Louis and her father George William paid in equal parts. She was detained in the north wing of the castle, a two-story half-timbered building, and guarded 24 hours a day by 40 men at arms, five to ten of whom were on duty at any one time. Her mail and visits were strictly controlled, though her mother had unlimited visiting rights. As far as anyone knows, she never attempted to escape.

Initially, Sophia Dorothea was allowed to walk unaccompanied only inside the mansion's courtyard. Later, she was permitted to enter the gardens under guard. After the first two years, she was permitted to make supervised journeys of up to two kilometres outside the walls. Her stay in Ahlden was interrupted several times because of war or when renovation of the residence was under way. During these times, she was transferred to Celle Castle or to Essel. Her entourage comprised two ladies in waiting, several chambermaids, and other household and kitchen staff, all selected for their loyalty to Hanover.

After her imprisonment, Sophia Dorothea was known as Duchess of Ahlden. At first, she was extremely apathetic and resigned to her fate, but in later years she tried to obtain her release. After her former father-in-law died in 1698, she sent a letter of condolence to her former husband, assuring him that "she prayed for him every day and begged him on her knees to forgive her mistakes. She will be eternally grateful to him if he allows her to see her two children." She also wrote a letter of condolence to the Electress Sophia, her former mother-in-law, claiming that she wanted nothing more than "to kiss Your Highness's hands before I die". Neither George Louis nor Sophia responded.

When Sophia Dorothea's father was on his deathbed in 1705, he wanted to see his daughter one last time to reconcile with her, but his chief minister, Count Bernstorff, objected, claiming that a meeting could lead to diplomatic problems with Hanover. George William died without seeing his daughter.

Sophia Dorothea is remembered for a significant act of charity during her imprisonment: after a devastating fire of Ahlden in 1715, she contributed considerable sums of money towards the rebuilding of the town.

=== Death and burial ===
The death of her mother in 1722 left Sophia Dorothea alone. When Sophia Dorothea's daughter, the Queen in Prussia, travelled to Hanover in 1725 to see her father, by then King George I of Great Britain, Sophia Dorothea, dressed even more carefully than usual, and waited every day at the window of her residence, hoping in vain to see her daughter.

Sophia Dorothea grew overweight, and was frequently plagued by febrile colds and indigestion. In early 1726, she suffered a stroke; in August of that year she went to bed with a severe colic, and refused all food and treatment. She died shortly before midnight on 13 November 1726, aged 60. An autopsy revealed liver failure and gall bladder occlusion due to 60 gallstones. Her former husband placed an announcement in The London Gazette to the effect that the Duchess of Ahlden had died, but he forbade mourning in either London or Hanover. He was furious when he heard that the members of his daughter's court in Berlin were wearing black.

The guards at Ahlden placed Sophia Dorothea's corpse in a lead coffin and deposited it in a cellar. In January 1727 an order came from London that she be buried without any ceremony in the cemetery of Ahlden, which was impossible after weeks of heavy rain. The coffin was brought back to the cellar and covered in sand. Not until May 1727 was Sophia Dorothea buried, secretly and at night, beside her parents in the Stadtkirche in Celle. George I died four weeks later while he was visiting Hanover.

=== Inheritance ===
Sophia Dorothea's parents seem to have believed to the last that their daughter would one day be released. In January 1705, shortly before her father's death, he and his wife drew up a joint will, under which their daughter was to receive the estates of Ahlden, Rethem and Walsrode, extensive estates in France, and Celle, her father's fortune and her mother's jewelry. Her father appointed Count Heinrich Sigismund von Bar as administrator of Sophia Dorothea's fortune. She named him as one of the main beneficiaries of her will, but he died six years before she did.

== Related history ==
- Eleonore von dem Knesebeck (1655–1717), Sophia Dorothea's lady-in-waiting and close confidant, was imprisoned in 1695 in Scharzfels Castle in the borough of Herzberg am Harz. After two years of solitary confinement, she managed to escape on 5 November 1697 and was able to flee to Wolfenbüttel under the protection of Duke Anthony Ulrich. She left a unique document in the room of the tower where she was confined: all the walls and doors were written down to the last corner with charcoal and chalk. The texts (sacred poems in the style of contemporary church hymns), were accusations against her enemies at court and memoir-like prose pieces; all these were recorded for the Hanover archive files. Until her death, she denied the adulterous relationship between Sophia Dorothea and von Königsmarck.
- A French adventurer, Marquis Armand de Lassay (1652–1738), claimed in his memoirs that he had received no fewer than thirteen love letters from Sophia Dorothea, but he never showed any documents to anyone.
- Sophia Dorothea's great-granddaughter Caroline Matilda of Great Britain, Queen consort of Denmark and Norway (1751–1775) shared her fate. After the Struensee affair in 1772, she was divorced from her husband, separated from her children and sent to Celle Castle, where she died three years later. In the crypt of the Stadtkirche St. Marien, both women are united in death.
- In 1804, Friedrich von Schiller planned a tragedy about Sophia Dorothea, to be called The Princess of Celle, but he never completed it.

== Film ==
Sophia Dorothea's affair is the basis of the British film Saraband for Dead Lovers (1948), in which she is played by Joan Greenwood and Königsmarck is played by Stewart Granger.
