= Bodo von Hodenberg =

Bodo von Hodenberg (3 April 1604 – 20 September 1650) was a German regional administrator and poet.

== Life ==
Born in Hudemühlen, Hodenberg was the son of Marquard von Hodenberg and Margarethe Münnich. At age 24, he was legitimised on 1 August 1628 by the emperor as a member of the Hodenberg noble family. He attended schools including the school of Kloster Möllenbeck and the Partikularschule in Hanover. He then studied at the Gießen University from 1617 to 1620. He returned to his parents, but studied further from 1622 at the Helmstedt University, and from 1626 at the Marburg University.

His father appointed Hodenberg in 1630 to Befehlshaber of the imperial regiment Holk. In 1631, Hodenberg was appointed Regierungsrat in the Principality of Grubenhagen. He died in Osterode am Harz.

Hodenberg wrote the text of a sacred morning song, "Vor deinen Thron tret ich hiermit", which is known for a setting by Johann Sebastian Bach.
