= Aller-Leine Valley =

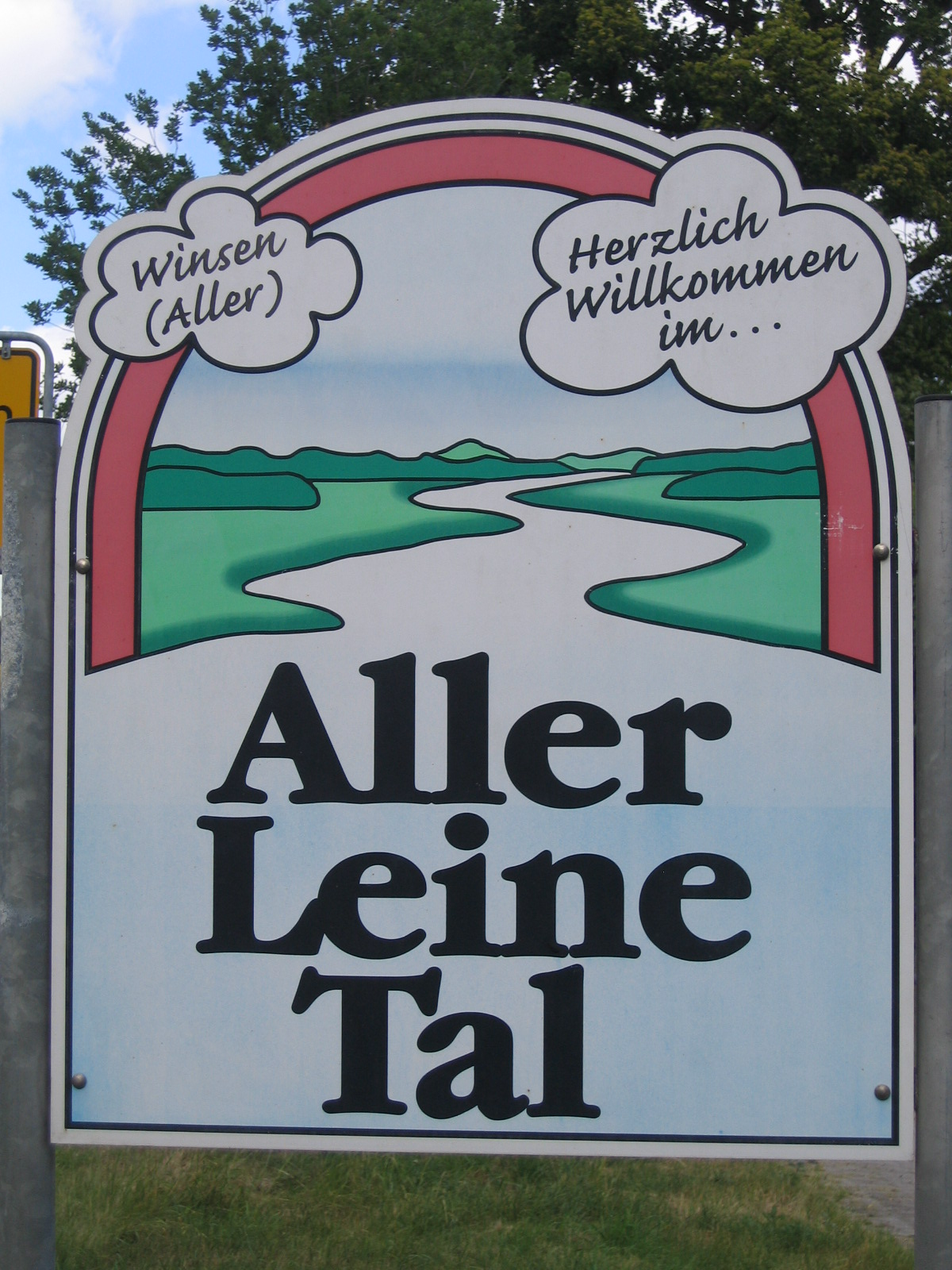
Sign for the Aller Leine Valley at Wolthausen

The Aller-Leine Valley (German: Aller-Leine-Tal) is the name of a region north of Hanover in Germany, that has been created for the purpose of regional marketing and inter-community cooperation. The Aller-Leine Valley initially only included the three collective municipalities of Ahlden, Rethem an der Aller and Schwarmstedt in the district of Soltau-Fallingbostel, that are situated on the southwestern edge of the Lüneburg Heath where the River Leine discharges into the Aller. Since 2001 the neighbouring municipalities of Hambühren, Wietze and Winsen an der Aller (in Celle district) as well as Dörverden and Kirchlinteln (Verden district) have become part of the Aller-Leine Valley region. The unifying theme and characteristic feature of the region is the river landscape of the Aller and Leine rivers.

== Attractions ==
There are 5 major tourist attractions in the region:

- The Serengeti Park at Hodenhagen.
- The Walsrode Bird Park near Walsrode.
- The Lüneburg Heath Wildlife Park in Nindorf.
- The Heide Park near Soltau.
- The Verden Magic Park at Verden an der Aller.

== Leisure activities ==
The Aller-Leine Valley has numerous trails and is popular with walkers and cyclists. Some of its waterways are navigable by canoes and rowing boats or the so-called Shuttle-Bike-Kit. There are also facilities for hot-air ballooning and tandem parachuting. Places of interest include mills, castles, old churches, abbeys and timber-framed houses. Several villages offer horse-and-carriage rides through the local heathland, moors and woods.
