= Hodenberg =

Old Lower Saxon noble family

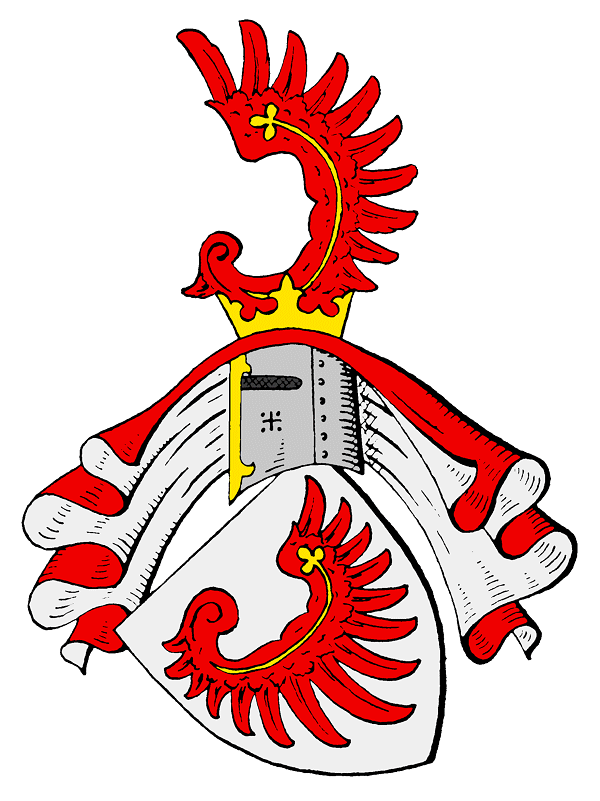
von Hodenberg coat of arms

The Hodenberg family is an old German noble family originated from Lower Saxony. The originally hochfrei family line belonged to the fourth military feudal level or Heerschild.

== History ==
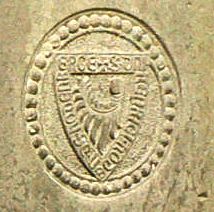
Coat of arms on a monument at the site of Hodenhagen Castle

Since early times the von Hodenberg lords were protectors (Schirmvögte) of the monastery at Bücken founded by Archbishop Rembert of Bremen. Their name was probably derived from this hereditary office, because in Low German the word Hode means Hut or Schirm (i.e. protection or shield). At one time Hodenberg Castle on the Weser, the oldest ancestral seat of the family, was situated in the vicinity of this monastery.

The oldest known progenitor was Hermann Hode, who was mentioned in 1149 in a deed by the Archbishop of Bremen, Hartwig I of Stade. Somewhat later another Hermann Hode appeared who, from 1168, was frequently named amongst the followers of Henry the Lion. The construction of Hoya Castle, not far from Hodenberg, built by the ambitious counts of Hoya, caused the Hodenberg lords to build Hodenhagen Castle near Hodenhagen east of the Weser in the first half of the 13th century. A descendant was named after it in 1244 dei gratia nobilis de Hodenhagen ("by the grace of God, nobleman of Hodenhagen"). In 1291 this son, Heinrich, Edelherr von Hodenhagen (Henry, Baron of Hodenhagen), sold Hodenberg Castle with all its estate west of the Weser and all its inhabitants to the counts of Hoya, who shortly afterwards also captured the estate of the Vogtei of Bücken. In 1313 Heinrich's sons, Hermann and Heinrich, also sold their own land east of the Weser, so that the counts of Hoya took possession of the entire Hodenberg estate.

Both brothers continued to call themselves Edelherren (barons), but married wives of lower noble status, so that their descendants lost their status as peers. From the 16th century two main family lines arose whose last common ancestor was Marquard III von Hodenberg (died 1538). In 1622 Emperor Ferdinand II gave the Marquard von Hodenberg and his family leave to be called the Edler (lord) von Hodenberg, a title which the line made no use of however. In 1859 George V of Hanover recognised the family as a barony.

== Coat of arms ==
The coat of arms displays a red wing on a silver shield, whose wing feathers curve downwards, and which is decorated with a golden stalked trefoil. The helmet is surmounted by a wing whose wing feathers curve round to the left. The mantling is red and silver.

== Bearers of the name ==
- Bodo von Hodenberg (1604–1650), German poet
- Wilhelm Freiherr von Hodenberg (1786–1861), German civil servant and politician
- Bodo von Hodenberg (1826–1907), German politician
- Hodo Freiherr von Hodenberg (1887–1962), German lawyer and politician
- Wilken Freiherr von Hodenberg (born 1954), director of Deutsche Beteiligungs AG
- Anna-Lena von Hodenberg (born 1982), German journalist and social entrepreneur

== Literature ==
- Otto Hupp: Münchener Kalender 1908. Verlagsanstalt München / Regensburg 1908.
- Dieter Brosius (1972). "Hodenberg, Freiherren von". Neue Deutsche Biographie (in German). Vol. 9. Berlin: Duncker & Humblot. pp. 298–298.
