= Lüneburg Heath Wildlife Park =

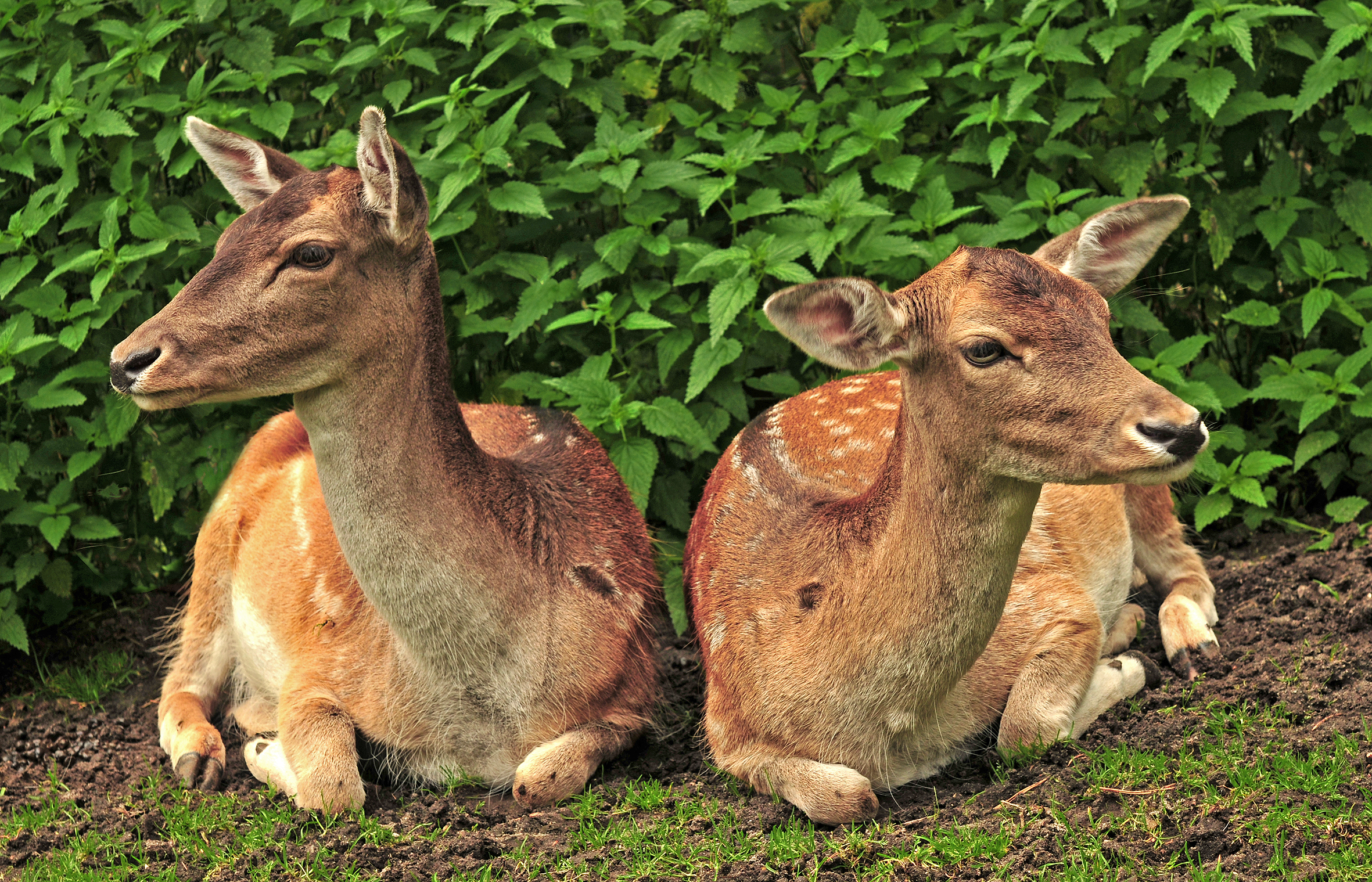
- Interactive map of Lüneburg Heath Wildlife Park
- 53.236699°N 10.044293°E
- Date opened: 1970
- Location: Nindorf, Hanstedt, Germany
- Land area: 61 hectares (150 acres)
- No. of animals: 1,000
- No. of species: 120
- Website: www.wild-park.de

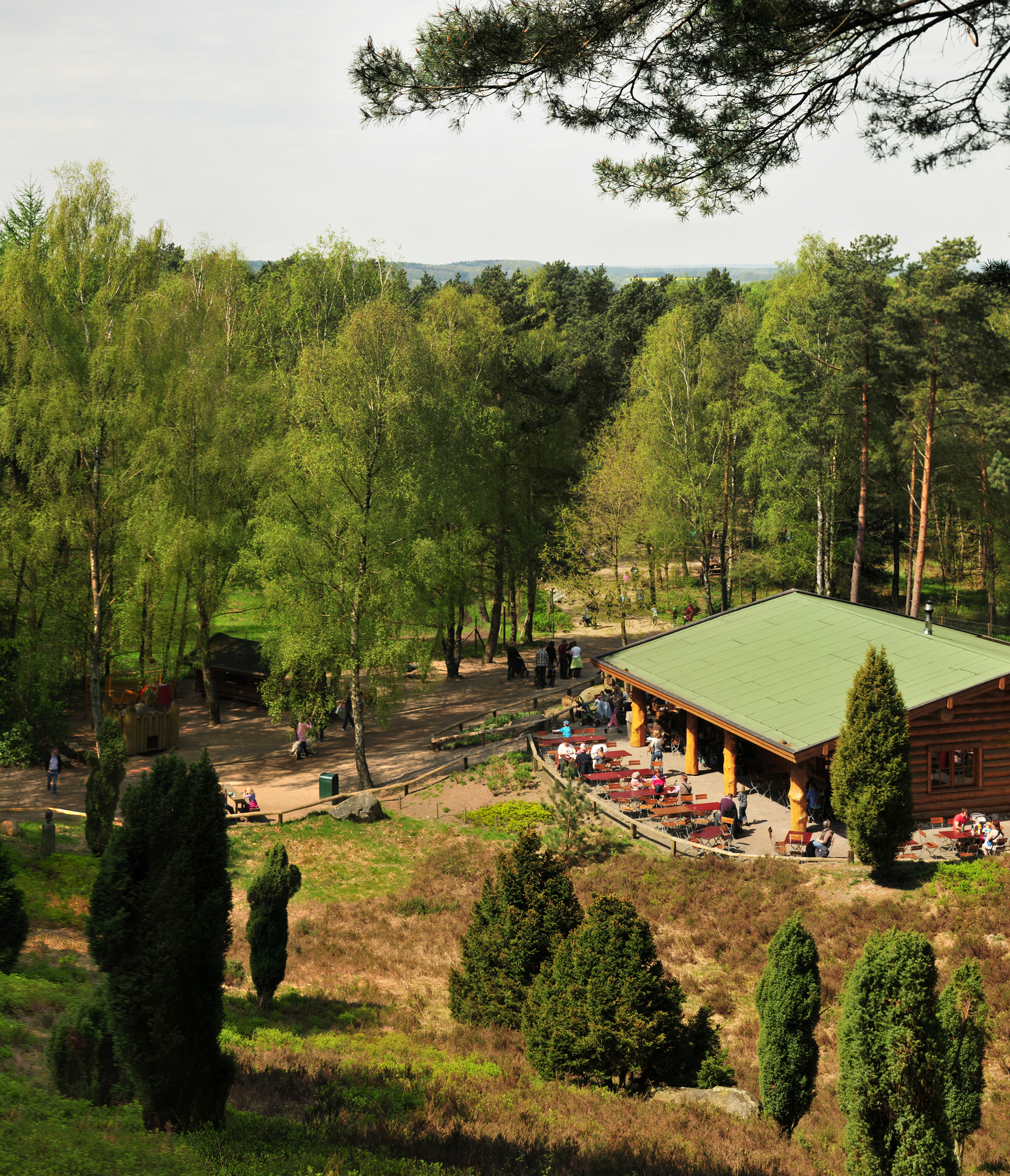
The "Moose Lodge Restaurant"

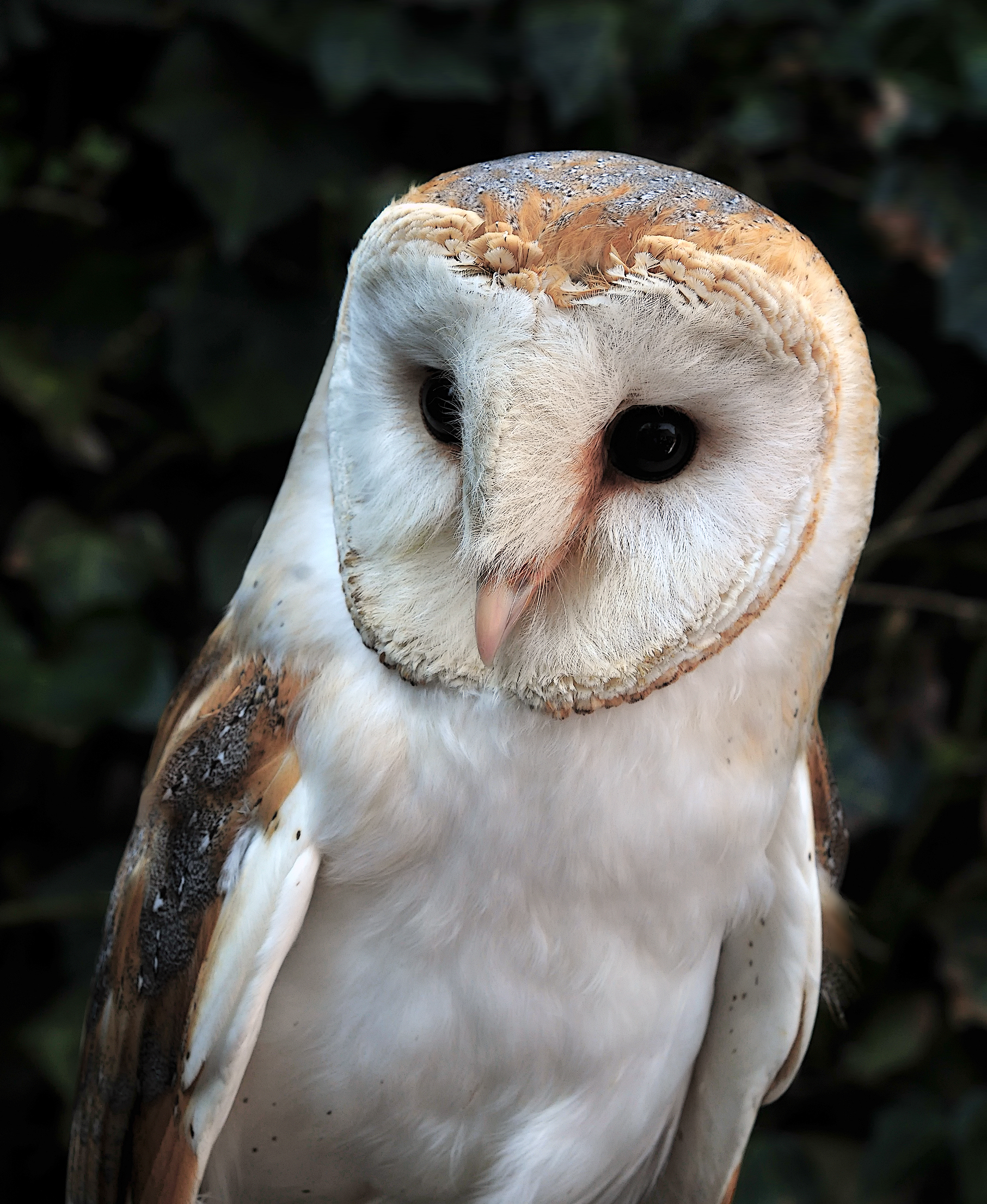
Barn owl in the Lüneburg Heath Wildlife Park

The Lüneburg Heath Wildlife Park (German: Wildpark Lüneburger Heide) is a wildlife park near Nindorf in the municipality of Hanstedt in the north German state of Lower Saxony. The park is home to around 1,000 animals of over 120 species in an area of 61 hectares (150 acres). The park is open all year.

== Attractions ==
The park specializes in animal species from the northern hemisphere, such as the grey wolf, Arctic wolf, brown bear, Kodiak bear, lynx, badgers, weasels, elk, red deer, reindeer, moose, sika deer, ibex, chamois and wild boar.

Siberian tigers

Two Siberian tigers, Alex and Ronja, live in a 3,400-square-metre (37,000 sq ft) naturalistic exhibit that opened in June 2010. The exhibit includes a rocky outcrop for the tigers to climb on, and ponds to swim in. Visitors can view the tigers through a 26-metre (85 ft) security fence that includes sections of bulletproof glass for better viewing.

Petting zoo

The petting zoo includes goats and deer, and children of all ages can pet and feed the animals.

== Conservation ==
The park participates in international wildlife conservation programmes for otters, red-crowned cranes, white-tailed eagles, snow leopards, muskoxen, mink and European bison.

== Education ==
From April to October, the park has educational presentations including "The animal my friend", which highlights the ability of birds of prey and other animals to learn, "Hunters of the air", in which falconers show the speed and agility of eagles, falcons, and vultures in the air, and "Faszination Wolf", a lecture about the forefathers of our domesticated dogs at the wolf enclosure, and otter feedings.

The Lüneburg Heath Wildlife Park hosted the zoo documentary series, Weiches Fell und scharfe Krallen ("Soft fur, sharp claws"), produced by the German TV company NDR. On 10 April 2007 it started its own series: Wolf, Bär & Co ("Wolf, Bear and Co.").

Guided tours are offered to school classes free of charge.
