= Eickeloh =

- Municipality
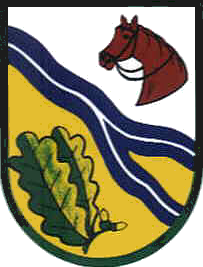
- Coat of arms

- Location of Eickeloh within Heidekreis district
- Interactive map of Eickeloh
- Location within Germany Location within Lower Saxony
- Coordinates: 52°44′N 09°36′E
- Country: Germany
- State: Lower Saxony
- District: Heidekreis
- Municipal assoc.: Ahlden

Government
  - Mayor: Julia Rühmkorf

Area
  - Total: 13.31 km^{2} (5.14 sq mi)
- Elevation: 24 m (79 ft)

Population (2025-12-31)
  - Total: 779
  - Density: 58.5/km^{2} (152/sq mi)
- Time zone: UTC+01:00 (CET)
  - Summer (DST): UTC+02:00 (CEST)
- Postal codes: 29693
- Dialling codes: 05164
- Vehicle registration: HK, SFA

Eickeloh (German pronunciation: [ˈaɪkəloː]) is a municipality in the Heidekreis district, in Lower Saxony, Germany.
