= Ahlden (Samtgemeinde) =

- Samtgemeinde
- Location of Ahlden within Heidekreis district
- Interactive map of Ahlden
- Location within Germany Location within Lower Saxony
- Coordinates: 52°45′49″N 09°35′21″E
- Country: Germany
- State: Lower Saxony
- District: Heidekreis
- Founded: 1974
- Subdivisions: 5 municipalities

Government
  - Mayor (2021–26): Carsten Niemann

Area
  - Total: 84.79 km^{2} (32.74 sq mi)
- Elevation: 25 m (82 ft)

Population (2025-12-31)
  - Total: 6,993
  - Density: 82.47/km^{2} (213.6/sq mi)
- Time zone: UTC+01:00 (CET)
  - Summer (DST): UTC+02:00 (CEST)
- Postal codes: 29693
- Dialling codes: 05164
- Vehicle registration: HK
- Website: www.ahlden.info

Ahlden is a Samtgemeinde ("collective municipality") in the Heidekreis district, in Lower Saxony, Germany. Its seat is in the village Hodenhagen.

The Samtgemeinde Ahlden consists of the following municipalities:

- Ahlden (Aller)
- Eickeloh
- Grethem
- Hademstorf
- Hodenhagen
