= Hademstorf =

- Municipality
- Coat of arms

- Location of Hademstorf within Heidekreis district
- Interactive map of Hademstorf
- Location within Germany Location within Lower Saxony
- Coordinates: 52°43′N 09°38′E
- Country: Germany
- State: Lower Saxony
- District: Heidekreis
- Municipal assoc.: Ahlden

Government
  - Mayor: Ulrike Wiechmann-Wrede

Area
  - Total: 9.23 km^{2} (3.56 sq mi)
- Elevation: 28 m (92 ft)

Population (2025-12-31)
  - Total: 849
  - Density: 92.0/km^{2} (238/sq mi)
- Time zone: UTC+01:00 (CET)
  - Summer (DST): UTC+02:00 (CEST)
- Postal codes: 29693
- Dialling codes: 05071
- Vehicle registration: HK, SFA

Hademstorf is a municipality in the district of Heidekreis, in Lower Saxony, Germany.
