= Serengeti Park =

Zoo in Hodenhagen, Germany

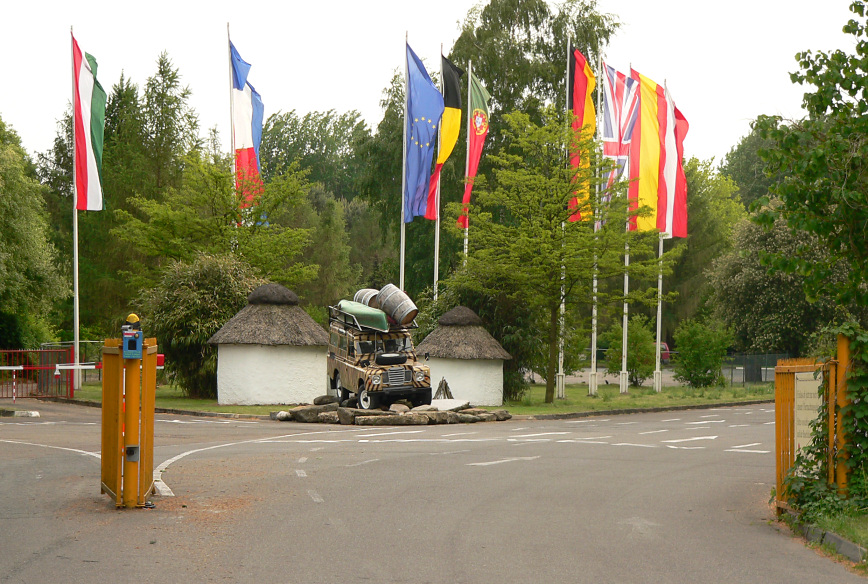
- Entrance
- Interactive map of Serengeti Park
- Location: Hodenhagen, Germany
- Coordinates: 52°44′44″N 9°37′0″E
- Opened: 1974
- Owner: Serengeti-Park Hodenhagen GmbH; Am Safaripark 1; 29693 Hodenhagen
- Area: 200 ha (490 acres)
- Website: www.Serengeti-Park.de

The Serengeti-Park in Hodenhagen, Lower Saxony, is a zoo and leisure park in North Germany.

== History ==
In 1972, the Duke of Bedford had the idea of building the largest safari park in Europe with partners from America. In 1974, this plan was realized and, since then, the Sepe family has run the park. When it opened the investors had spent about 20 million deutschmarks. In 1983, the park was extensively renovated. Nowadays the park consists of three different areas: Serengeti-Safari, Jungle-Safari and Adventure-Safari. In 1996, Serengeti Park was the first to release white rhinos, bred in Europe, back into the wild.

In 2003, Serengeti Park admitted its first white tiger. In 2004, Serengeti Park received permanent recognition as a zoological garden in accordance with current EU guideline 99/22/EG and §45 of the north German nature reserve law and on the basis of a LANA inspection. 23 March 2006 saw the first African elephant calf to be born in north Germany for 30 years.

On 27 August 2019, a 30-year-old rhinoceros called Kusini attacked a zookeeper's car and flipped it over at least three times in an incident captured on video. The zookeeper suffered minor injuries. Kusini arrived at the zoo 18 months prior to the incident as part of a breeding program and was reportedly struggling to adjust.

== Zones ==
Serengeti Park is divided into three zones: Serengeti-Safari, Jungle-Safari and Adventure-Safari.

=== Serengeti-Safari ===
The Serengeti-Safari covers an area of 110 hectares (270 acres), has around 1,500 animals living in the open and can be visited by car. Alternatively visitors can use a Serengeti Bus. The zone is divided into 17 sections.

- Section 1 known as outdoor enclosure East Africa contains: eland, giraffe, blue wildebeest, waterbuck, sable antelope, gemsbok, patas monkey, ruffed lemur
- Section 2, Central Africa: greater kudu and lesser kudu, sitatunga, impala, Nile lechwe and East African bongo may be seen.
- Section 3, Europe: fallow deer, red deer, Highland cattle and miniature ponies.
- Section 4, West Africa: dama gazelle, nyala, oryx, waterbuck.
- Section 5, North America: wapiti, bison, donkey
- Section 6, Russia: sika deer, blackbuck, domestic yak and Amur leopards may be seen.
- Section 7, South America: spider monkey, rhea, guanaco, zebu, South American tapir, capybara
- Section 8, Asia: Père David's deer, lar gibbon, nilgai, blackbuck, chital, Bactrian camel
- Section 9: Bengal tiger and striped hyena
- Section 10: lion
- Section 11: white tiger
- Section 12: white lion
- Section 13, North Africa: sacred baboon, kulan, ostrich, dromedary, Barbary sheep, scimitar-horned oryx
- Section 14, Kenia: cheetah, flamingo
- Section 15, Southern Africa: Burchell's zebra, ostrich, Watusi cattle, white rhinoceros, addax
- Section 16, Ivory Valley includes an enclosure with African elephants and red river hog
- Section 17, Masai Mara: vervet monkey, giraffe, ostrich, crowned crane, black wildebeest, roan antelope, helmeted guineafowl, white stork, gemsbok

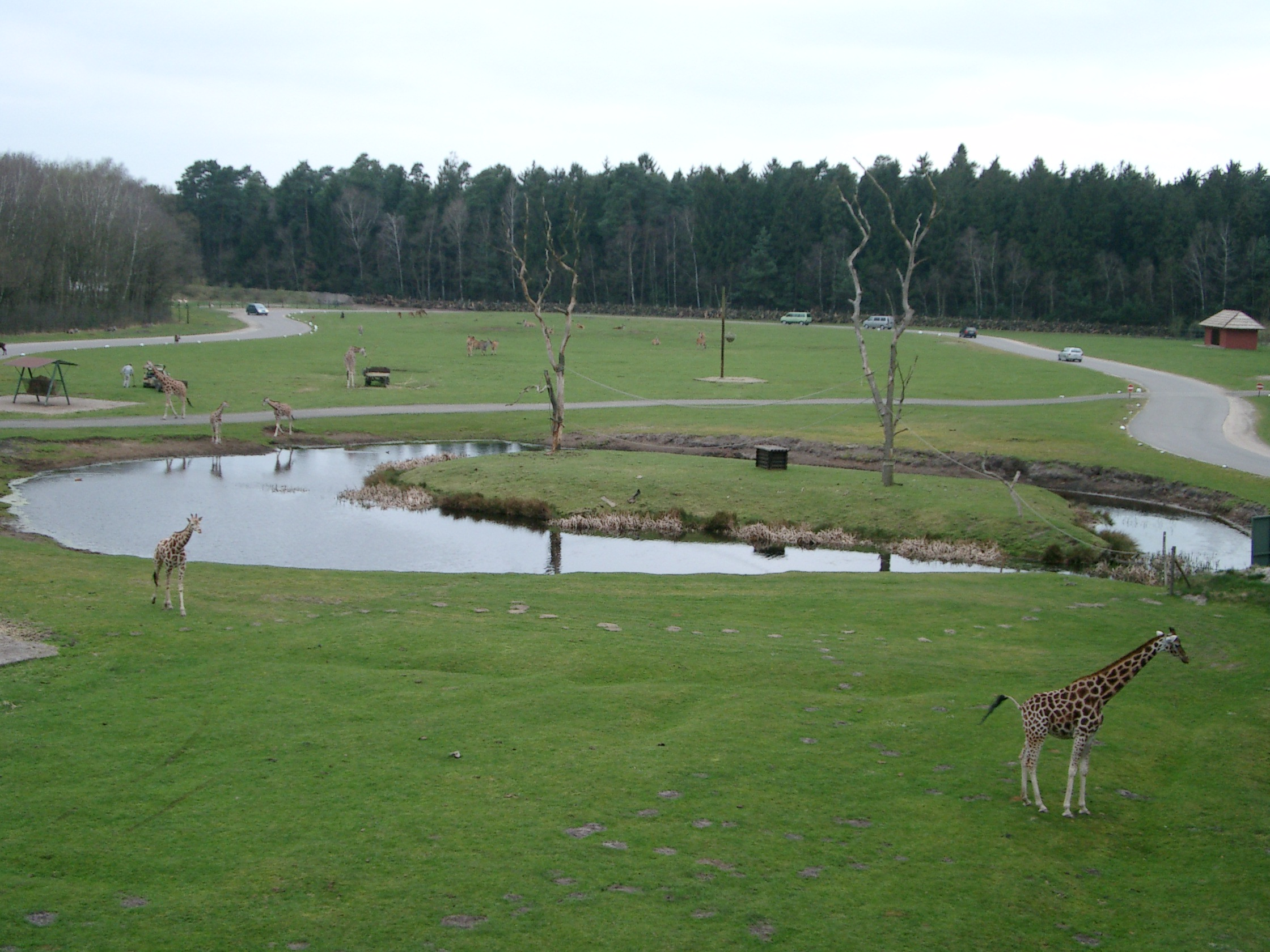
The outdoor enclosure East Africa of the Serengeti-Safari

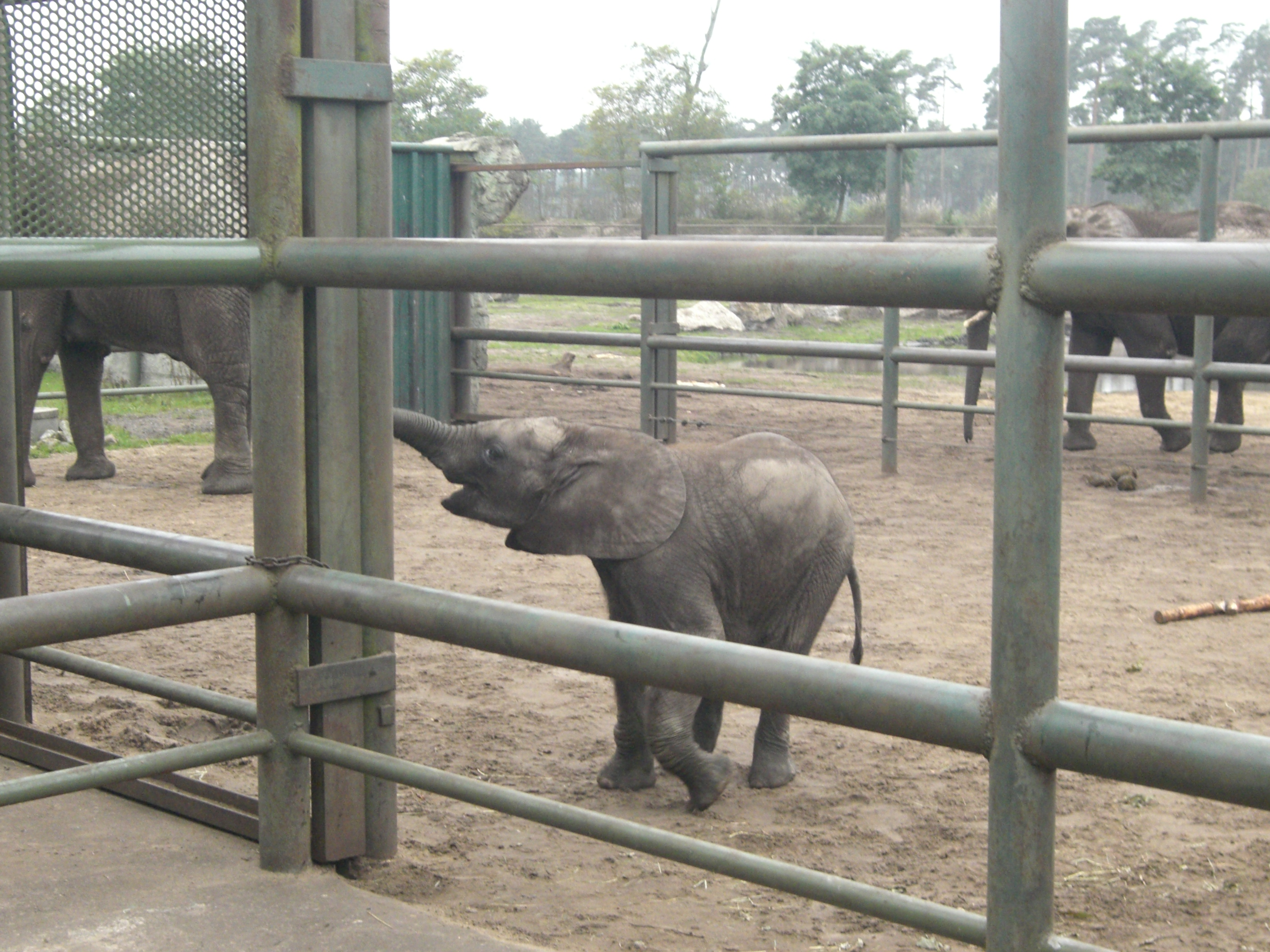
Elephant calf Bou Bou

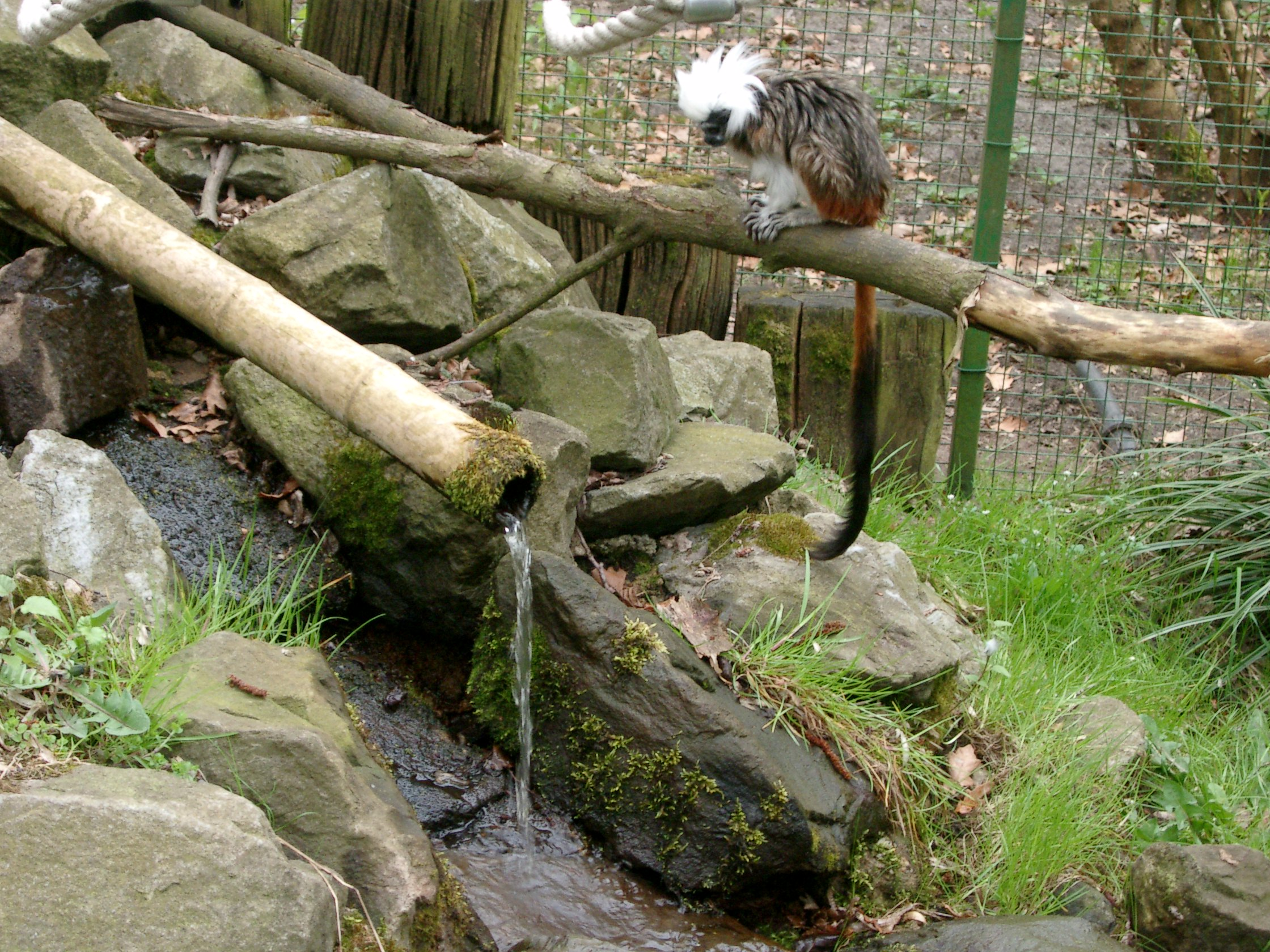
Cottontop tamarin in Serengeti Park

Since early 2003, four white tigers have been added to Animal World in a new enclosure. The tigers were formerly part of Circus Barum and were given to Serengeti Park by Gerd Siemoneit-Barum on being retired. In December 2006, the first successful breeding of a tiger was achieved with the birth of tiger cub Paul.

=== Jungle-Safari ===
Twenty different species of monkey live in the Jungle-Safari (for example: Barbary macaques, squirrel monkeys, mantled guereza, white-headed lemurs, tufted capuchins, ring-tailed lemurs, white-headed capuchins, green monkeys, patas monkeys, grey langurs, lar gibbons, cottontop tamarins, common marmosets, chimpanzees), some in walk-through enclosures. The Jungle Safari Tour also begins in there. This open-top bus tour takes part in the Serengeti-Safari in Safari style and also negotiates an off-road section with special effects.

=== Adventure-Safari ===
In Adventure-Safari there are over 40 different fairground rides suitable for children and adults, such as the Roller Coaster or Ferris Wheel. The Serengeti restaurant, Manyara, is also located there.

== Shows ==
There are three different shows taking place regularly in Serengeti-Park:

- Kumeka - The Awakening of the Jungle
- Okavango - The Water Show
- Jambo Bongo - Get involved
- Additionally you can watch the staff feeding the monkeys in the Amboseli Reserve

== Accommodation ==
Since 2007, it has been possible to stay at Serengeti Park. Eighty holiday homes with a total of over 200 beds are available. In addition, there is a conference room with around 200 seats.
