= Ahlden House =

Coordinates: 52.759°N 9.558°E

- Schloss Ahlden
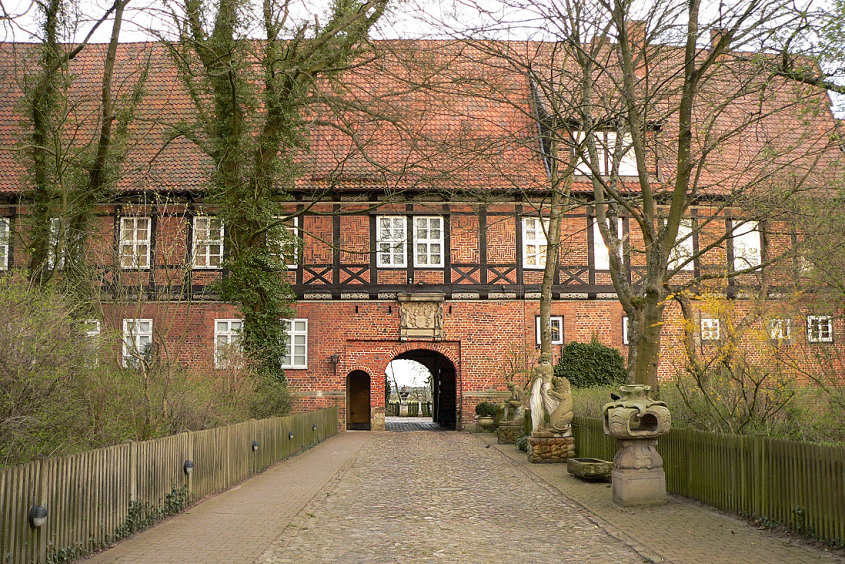
- Main building of 1613 and entrance to the house

General information
- Type: Stately home
- Location: Ahlden, Germany
- Opened: 1549

Technical details
- Material: Timber-framed
- Floor count: 2

Ahlden House (German: Schloss Ahlden) is a stately home at Ahlden on the Lüneburg Heath in Lower Saxony, Germany. It was built in 1549, originally as a water castle on the river Aller, which has since changed its course. Nowadays the three-winged mansion is a private residence and is used as an arts auction house.

It is principally known as the place of imprisonment of Sophia Dorothea of Celle, otherwise Sophie Dorothea of Brunswick-Lüneburg, wife of George I of Great Britain and the mother of George II of Great Britain.

== Location ==
Opposite the mansion, in a depression on the other bank of the river, was the old castle of Bunkenburg which lies today in ruins. It is believed to have been built in the 13th century. It was established opposite the village of Ahlden on the banks of the Aller. In 1618, during a flood, the Aller shifted its channel towards the east and, as the result of an embankment downstream, the waters of the Leine then flowed past Ahlden in the bed of the former Aller. Since 1648 the course of the "Old Leine" has become a partly dried oxbow lake. The present house was built in the 16th century on the river bank by Ahlden opposite the Bunkenburg. Today it is located on the old branch of the Aller, which was the one that channeled the waters of the Leine in 1618 and has since been called the "Old Leine".

== Construction ==
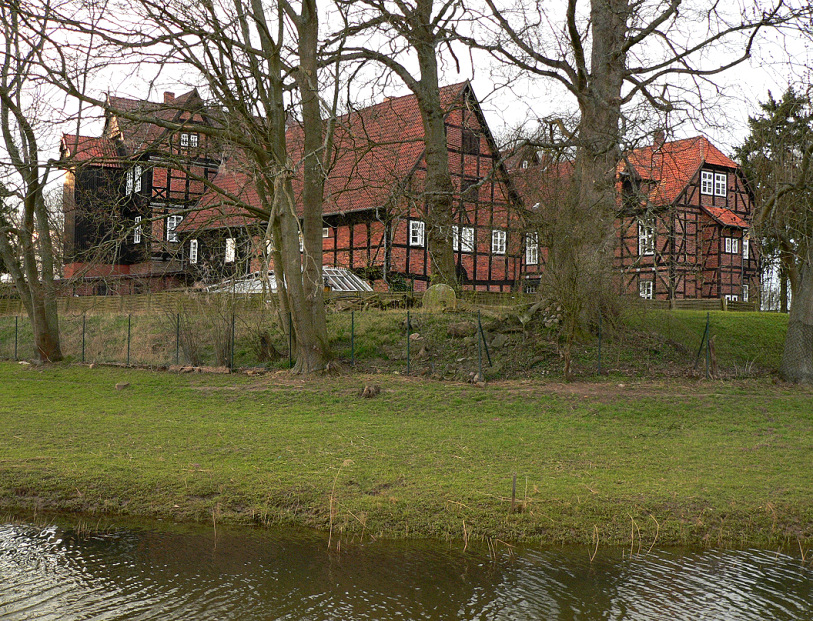
Rear of the three-winged building with moat

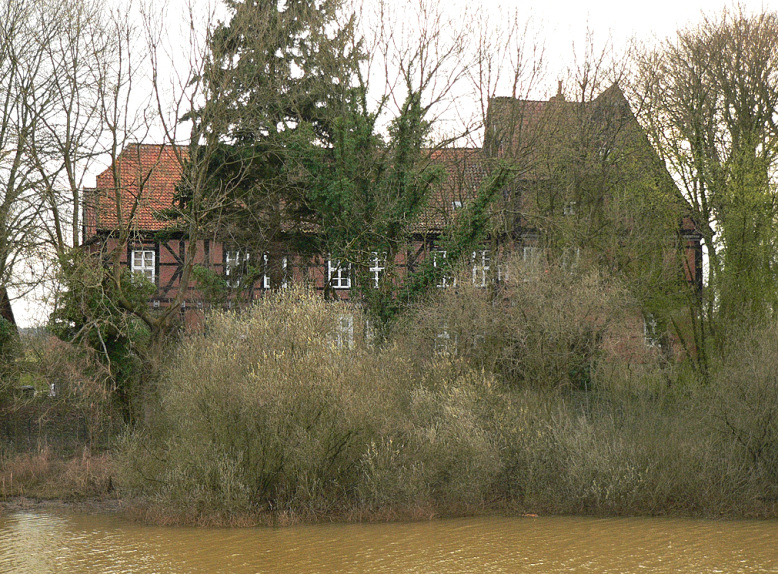
Side view of the house from the old branch of the river Leine

Much of the house is of timber-framed construction; only the ground floor of the west wing being built of brick. The building today consists of three, two-storey wings in the shape of a horseshoe, which were built in 1549. In earlier centuries the site was, for a time, almost entirely enclosed and had an interior courtyard. The individual wings of the building were not only used for residential rooms, but as for stables and coach houses (Remisen).

The west wing is the main building of the mansion, which Duke Christian the Elder of Brunswick-Lüneburg had built by his seneschal (Drost), Johann Behr, in 1613. On the entranceway leading to the inner courtyard the wall recesses for the drawbridge can still be seen. During the construction of the wing in 1613 there was a serious accident when a roof joist dislodged and seriously injured 14 workers.

The south wing, a timber-framed structure with brick infill, is the oldest part of the building. It was completed in 1579 under Duke William the Younger of Brunswick-Lüneburg, as an inscription on one of the beams records. The inner courtyard side of the wing has a lavishly decorated Renaissance facade.

The north wing is a timber-framed structure that was redesigned in 1705 by the architect, Johann Caspar Borchmann, because the building was falling into disrepair. Outside the house there was a gatehouse and entranceway. It guarded access to the house and was demolished probably around 1800. The building is clearly recognisable on the Merian engraving of 1654 as a detached building.

Originally the castle was surrounded by a double moat and a rampart. The rampart was levelled in 1690 in order to create a French pleasure garden. The moats were filled in during the 19th century.

== History ==
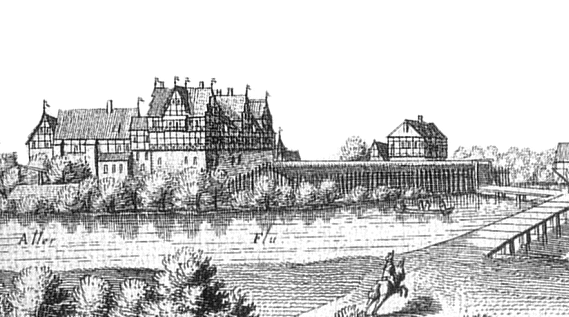
Ahlden Castle in the Merian engraving dating to about 1654

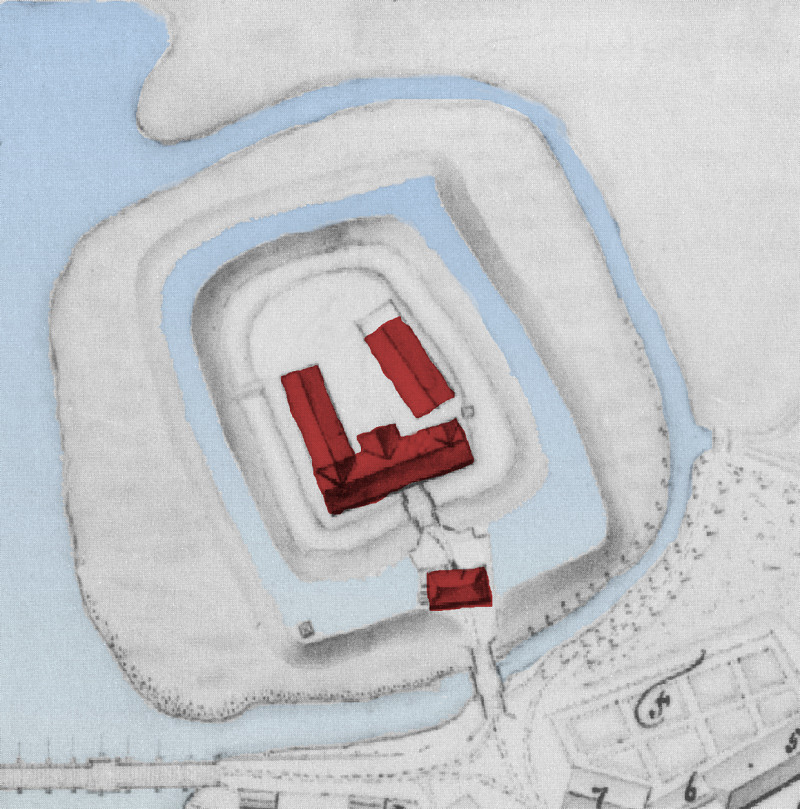
Plan of the house in 1747

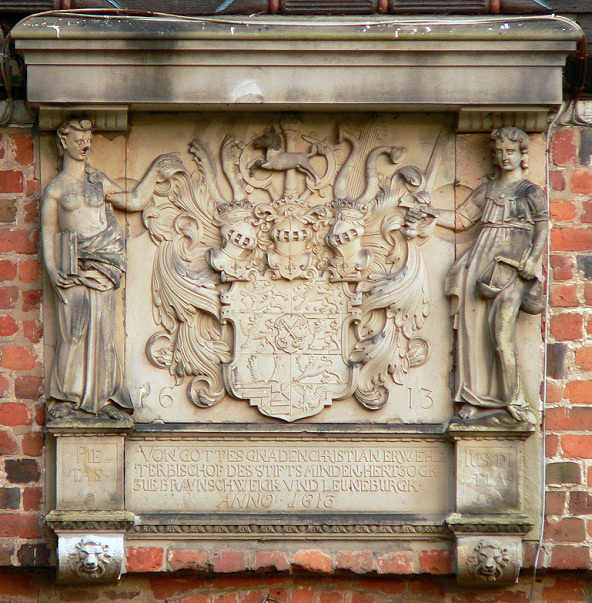
The Welf coat-of-arms over the entrance together with the date of construction: 1613

The castle's predecessor, Bunkenburg, appeared on the opposite bank of the Aller, a detail also mentioned by Merian. The occupants of this castle were the House of Ahlden, first mentioned in the 13th century, who were knights (Ritter) and Burgmanns. The fortification was first mentioned in the records in 1433, and had previously belonged to the Diocese of Minden. In 1431 there was a change of seat from Ahlden and its castle. The lords of Ahlden lost everything in the conflict with the diocese and the House of Welf. They had broken their bond not to pursue any more feuds or carry out any more raids. As a result, Ahlden ended up in the possession of the Duke of Lüneburg. Between 1443 and 1575 the seat of Ahlden was mortgaged to the von Mandelsloh family. Not until the 16th century was the present house built, whilst Bunkenburg fell into ruin.

The princely office (Amt) of Ahlden was established in 1431. It took over the management and exercised jurisdiction over the area. The house also belonged to the Amt. The office was headed by an Amtmann, who collected taxes from the citizens and farmed the land on the state-owned farm, the estate of the house. From 1784 the house underwent major alterations to adapt it to administrative purposes and it also housed the prison. After about 450 years in existence, the Amt of Ahlden was disbanded in 1884 and its function was transferred to the district of Fallingbostel. The building then housed the district court (Amtsgericht) until 1972. Justice had been dispensed in Ahlden since 1310.

In the Thirty Years' War the house was occupied by the imperial troops under Tilly after a day's siege. They defended it against an unsuccessful attack by 800 besieging Danish troops. From 1726 Ahlden House was the residence of the state seneschals.

The considerable renovation work required was completed in 1975 at a cost of 90,000 DM from state funds. An antiques auctions house bought the house for its representational headquarters, on the condition that the courtyard would be kept open for the public during the day. Limited viewing of the interior is only possible when previewing items for auctions.

=== Prison ===
When she was divorced from her husband in 1694 after her affair with Lieutenant Königsmarck, Sophie Dorothea of Brunswick-Lüneburg was brought to Ahlden House, where she was imprisoned until her death in 1726.

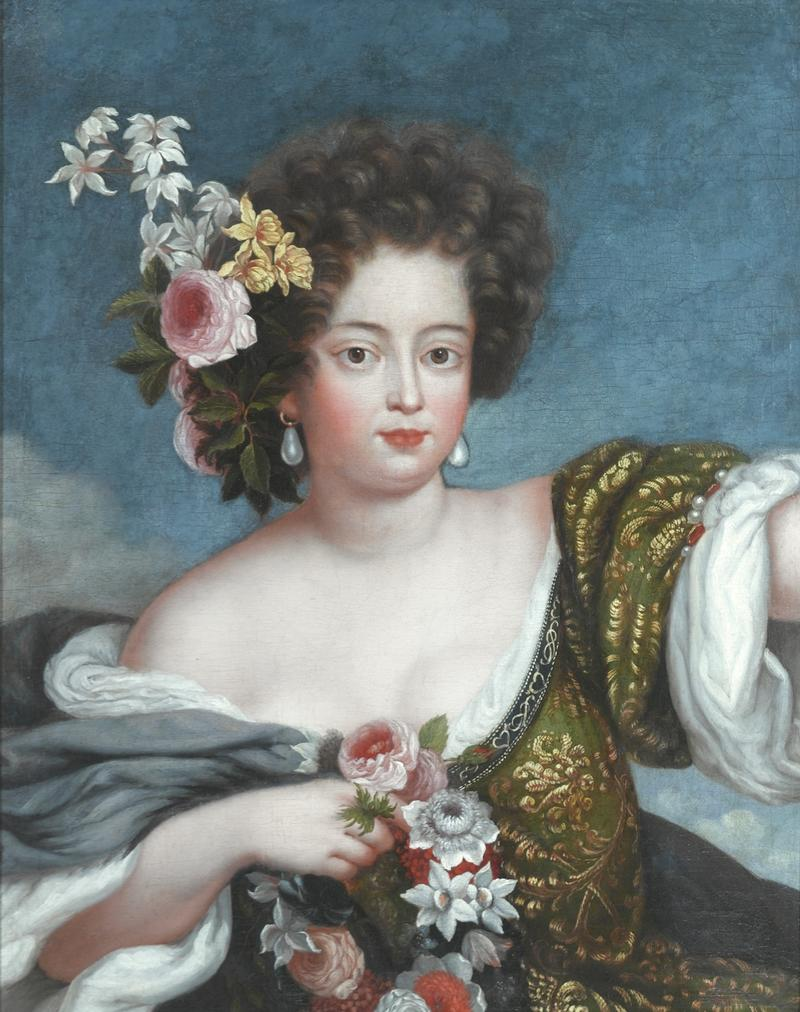
Sophie-Dorothea of Brunswick-Lüneburg-Celle

== See also ==
- Ahlden

== Sources and external links ==
- Ahlden (in German)
