= Bierde =

Coordinates: 52.78338°N 9.50448°E

Bierde
State:	Lower Saxony
District:	Heidekreis
Collective municipality:	Rethem/Aller
Area: (excluding outer areas)	ca. 14 km^{2}
Population;	ca. 350
Post code:	29693
Dial code:	05164
Car number plate code:	SFA
Mayor:	Heinz-Wilhelm Korte

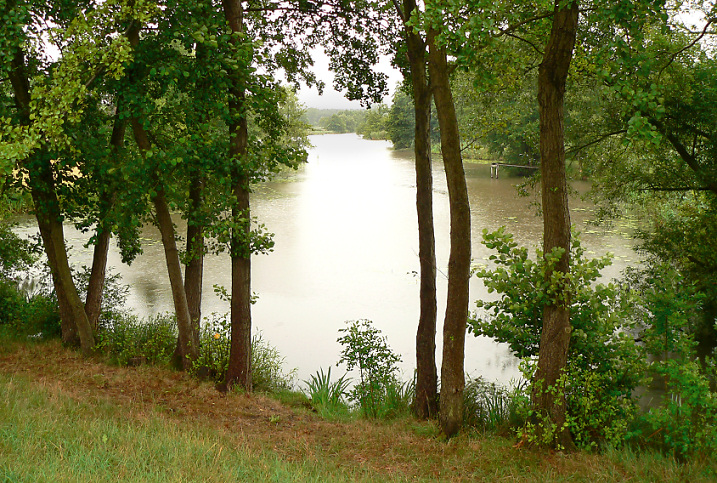
The lake of Bierder See

Bierde is a village in the municipality of Böhme, Lower Saxony, that is part of Heidekreis district in the German state of Lower Saxony.

== Bierder Burg ==
Near the lake, known as the Bierder See, is a wood in which the ruins of an old castle are located. There are the remnants of five ditches that acted as a defence against enemies. The castle itself was intended to control the river Aller, which passes it at a distance of about 100 metres.

== Legends ==
There are many legends about Bierde. The Karlsberg (the highest point in Bierde) is especially shrouded in legend. One of them tells of two giants that fought and hurled stones at each other. These stones then formed the Karlsberg.

Another story tells of when the emperor Charlemagne (German: Karl der Große), stayed there, which is why the hill is named after him.

== Dorfhaus ==
In the centre of the village is the Dorfhaus ("village house"), the old village school.
