= Essel, Lower Saxony =

- Municipality
- Coat of arms

- Location of Essel, Lower Saxony within Heidekreis district
- Interactive map of Essel, Lower Saxony
- Location within Germany Location within Lower Saxony
- Coordinates: 52°41′22″N 9°38′37″E
- Country: Germany
- State: Lower Saxony
- District: Heidekreis
- Municipal assoc.: Schwarmstedt
- Subdivisions: 4 Ortschaften

Government
  - Mayor: Bernd Block (CDU)

Area
  - Total: 34.15 km^{2} (13.19 sq mi)
- Elevation: 27 m (89 ft)

Population (2025-12-31)
  - Total: 1,222
  - Density: 35.78/km^{2} (92.68/sq mi)
- Time zone: UTC+01:00 (CET)
  - Summer (DST): UTC+02:00 (CEST)
- Postal codes: 29690
- Dialling codes: 0 50 71
- Vehicle registration: HK, SFA
- Website: www.essel.de

Essel (German pronunciation: [ˈɛsl̩]) is a municipality in the Heidekreis district, in Lower Saxony, Germany. Most of the village is located on the southern bank of the river Aller. The A 7 motorway runs through the village.

== Subdivisions ==
The municipality of Essel comprises 4 subdivisions:

- Essel
- Engehausen
- Stillenhöfen
- Ostenholz Moor

== History ==
Essel was first mentioned in 1251 as Esele. The surveillance of the Aller crossing at Essel and control of Aller shipping was undertaken by the three lords of Hademstorf. In the 14th century their seat was at Uhlenburg. This castle was situated in the Aller valley between Essel and Buchholz (Aller) and was destroyed in 1394 by the Dukes of Brunswick-Lüneburg.

Another castle was built in the 13th century at Engehausen—Blankenburg Castle—on the site of which a manor house was subsequently built.
