= Grethem =

- Municipality
- Coat of arms

- Location of Grethem within Heidekreis district
- Interactive map of Grethem
- Location within Germany Location within Lower Saxony
- Coordinates: 52°43′N 09°35′E
- Country: Germany
- State: Lower Saxony
- District: Heidekreis
- Municipal assoc.: Ahlden

Government
  - Mayor: Udo Schönberg

Area
  - Total: 16.45 km^{2} (6.35 sq mi)
- Elevation: 24 m (79 ft)

Population (2025-12-31)
  - Total: 659
  - Density: 40.1/km^{2} (104/sq mi)
- Time zone: UTC+01:00 (CET)
  - Summer (DST): UTC+02:00 (CEST)
- Postal codes: 29690
- Dialling codes: 05164
- Vehicle registration: FAL, SFA
- Website: www.grethem.de

Grethem (German pronunciation: [ˈɡʁeːtəm]) is a municipality in the district of Heidekreis, in Lower Saxony, Germany.
