= Rethem =

- Town
- Coat of arms

- Location of Rethem within Heidekreis district
- Interactive map of Rethem
- Location within Germany Location within Lower Saxony
- Coordinates: 52°47′5″N 9°22′41″E
- Country: Germany
- State: Lower Saxony
- District: Heidekreis
- Municipal assoc.: Rethem (Aller)
- Subdivisions: 4 Ortschaften

Government
  - Mayor: Karl-Dieter Oestmann (CDU)

Area
  - Total: 34.08 km^{2} (13.16 sq mi)
- Elevation: 16 m (52 ft)

Population (2025-12-31)
  - Total: 2,327
  - Density: 68.28/km^{2} (176.8/sq mi)
- Time zone: UTC+01:00 (CET)
  - Summer (DST): UTC+02:00 (CEST)
- Postal codes: 27336
- Dialling codes: 05165
- Vehicle registration: HK, SFA
- Website: www.rethem.de

Rethem (German: [ˈʁeːtəm]) is a town in the Heidekreis in Lower Saxony, Germany. It is situated on the river Aller, approx. 25 km southwest of Bad Fallingbostel, and 18 km southeast of Verden. The town was the scene of heavy fighting over the period 10–11 April 1945 between units of the British 53rd Welsh Division and parts of the German 2. Marine-Infanterie-Division with heavy losses on both sides. Most of the German soldiers were not older than 23 years.

Rethem is the seat of the Samtgemeinde ("collective municipality") Rethem (Aller).
