= Hodenhagen =

- Municipality
- Coat of arms

- Location of Hodenhagen within Heidekreis district
- Interactive map of Hodenhagen
- Location within Germany Location within Lower Saxony
- Coordinates: 52°46′N 9°35′E
- Country: Germany
- State: Lower Saxony
- District: Heidekreis
- Municipal assoc.: Ahlden

Government
  - Mayor: Karl-Gerhard Tamke (SPD)

Area
  - Total: 20.1 km^{2} (7.8 sq mi)
- Elevation: 24 m (79 ft)

Population (2025-12-31)
  - Total: 3,076
  - Density: 153/km^{2} (396/sq mi)
- Time zone: UTC+01:00 (CET)
  - Summer (DST): UTC+02:00 (CEST)
- Postal codes: 29693
- Dialling codes: 05164
- Vehicle registration: HK
- Website: www.hodenhagen.de

Hodenhagen (German pronunciation: [hoːdn̩ˈhaːɡn̩]) is a municipality in the district of Heidekreis, in Lower Saxony, Germany. The town was once the site of Hudemühlen Castle, which is now destroyed. The castle was famous as the home of the kobold Hinzelmann. The site of another medieval castle, Hodenhagen Castle on the River Meiße, is also located nearby. Serengeti Park, an amusement park with a safari theme, is located within the municipality.
