= Ahlden =

- Municipality
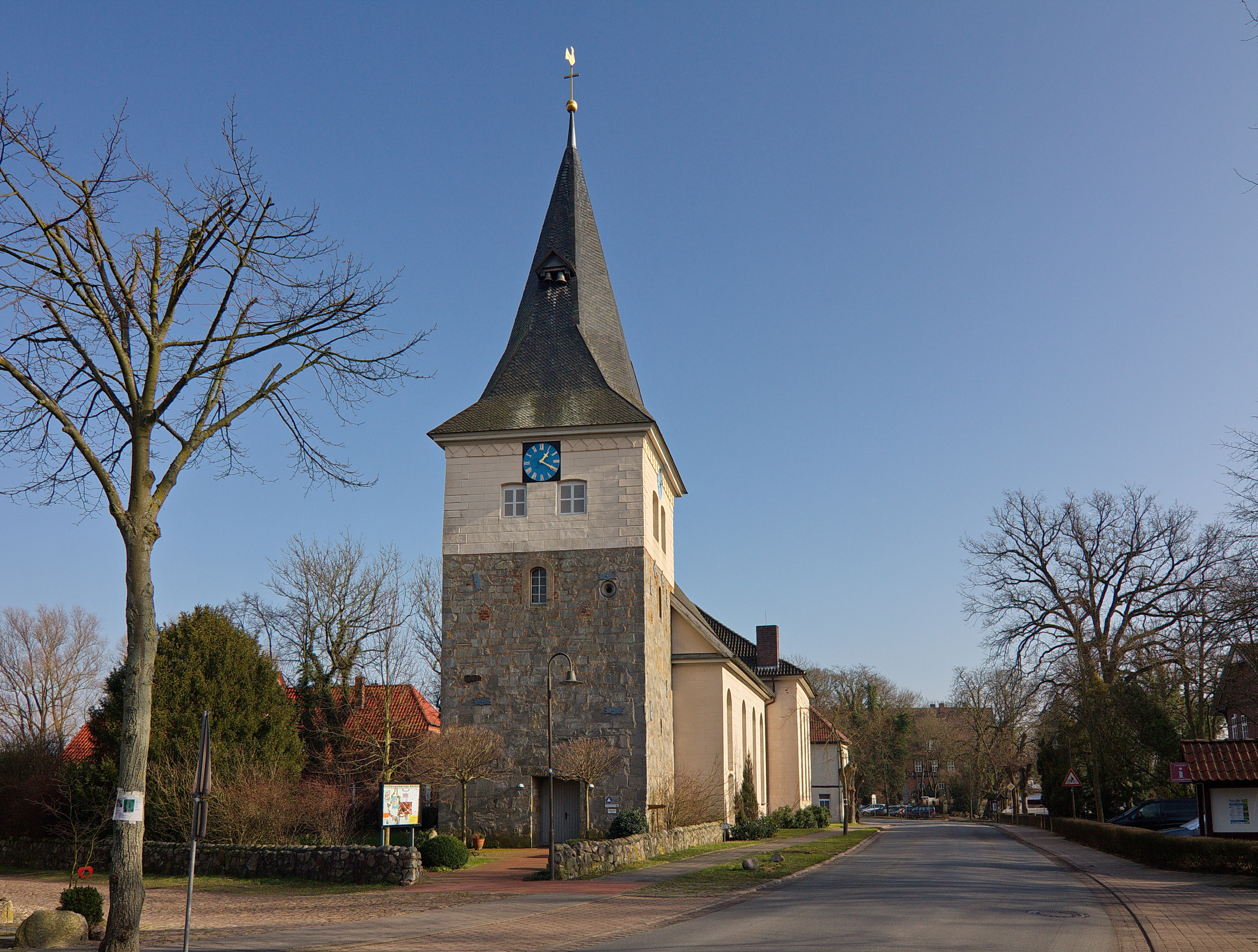
- Church of Ahlden

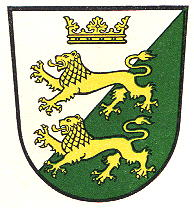
- Coat of arms

- Location of Ahlden within Heidekreis district
- Interactive map of Ahlden
- Location within Germany Location within Lower Saxony
- Coordinates: 52°45′41″N 09°33′15″E
- Country: Germany
- State: Lower Saxony
- District: Heidekreis
- Municipal assoc.: Ahlden
- Subdivisions: 2 Ortschaften

Government
  - Mayor: Reinhard Stelter

Area
  - Total: 25.94 km^{2} (10.02 sq mi)
- Elevation: 21 m (69 ft)

Population (2025-12-31)
  - Total: 1,630
  - Density: 62.8/km^{2} (163/sq mi)
- Time zone: UTC+01:00 (CET)
  - Summer (DST): UTC+02:00 (CEST)
- Postal codes: 29693
- Dialling codes: 05164
- Vehicle registration: HK, SFA
- Website: www.ahlden.de

Ahlden (German pronunciation: [ˈaːldn̩]) is a municipality in the Heidekreis district in Lower Saxony, Germany. It is situated on the river Aller, approx. 15 km southwest of Bad Fallingbostel, and 30 km southeast of Verden.

Ahlden is located in the Samtgemeinde ("collective municipality") of Ahlden.

== Famous people ==
Napoleonic wars officer Christian Friedrich Wilhelm von Ompteda, a Colonel in the British army's Kings German Legion who died in action at the Battle of Waterloo was from Ahlden.

== See also ==
- Ahlden House
