= Baumax =

Former Austrian DIY store chain

bauMax AG
- Type: Private
- Industry: Retail
- Founded: 1976 in Klosterneuburg, Austria
- Founder: Karlheinz Essl Sr.
- Defunct: February 8, 2016; 10 years ago
- Fate: Dissolved
- Headquarters: Klosterneuburg, Austria
- Key people: Michael Hürter, CEO
- Products: Home improvement products
- Revenue: ▼€1,130 million (2013)
- Net income: ▼ (€189 million) (2013)
- Number of employees: 6,200 (2015)

The Baumax AG (own spelling: bauMax) was an Austrian chain of home improvement stores. It was founded in 1976 by Karlheinz Essl Sr. in the city of Klosterneuburg and operated more than 150 stores in Austria and several countries of Central and Eastern Europe. In 2010, the company employed over 9,000 people and generated an annual revenue of 1.13 billion euros. The business came into financial trouble during the Great Recession. It was finally broken up by creditors in 2015/16.

== History ==
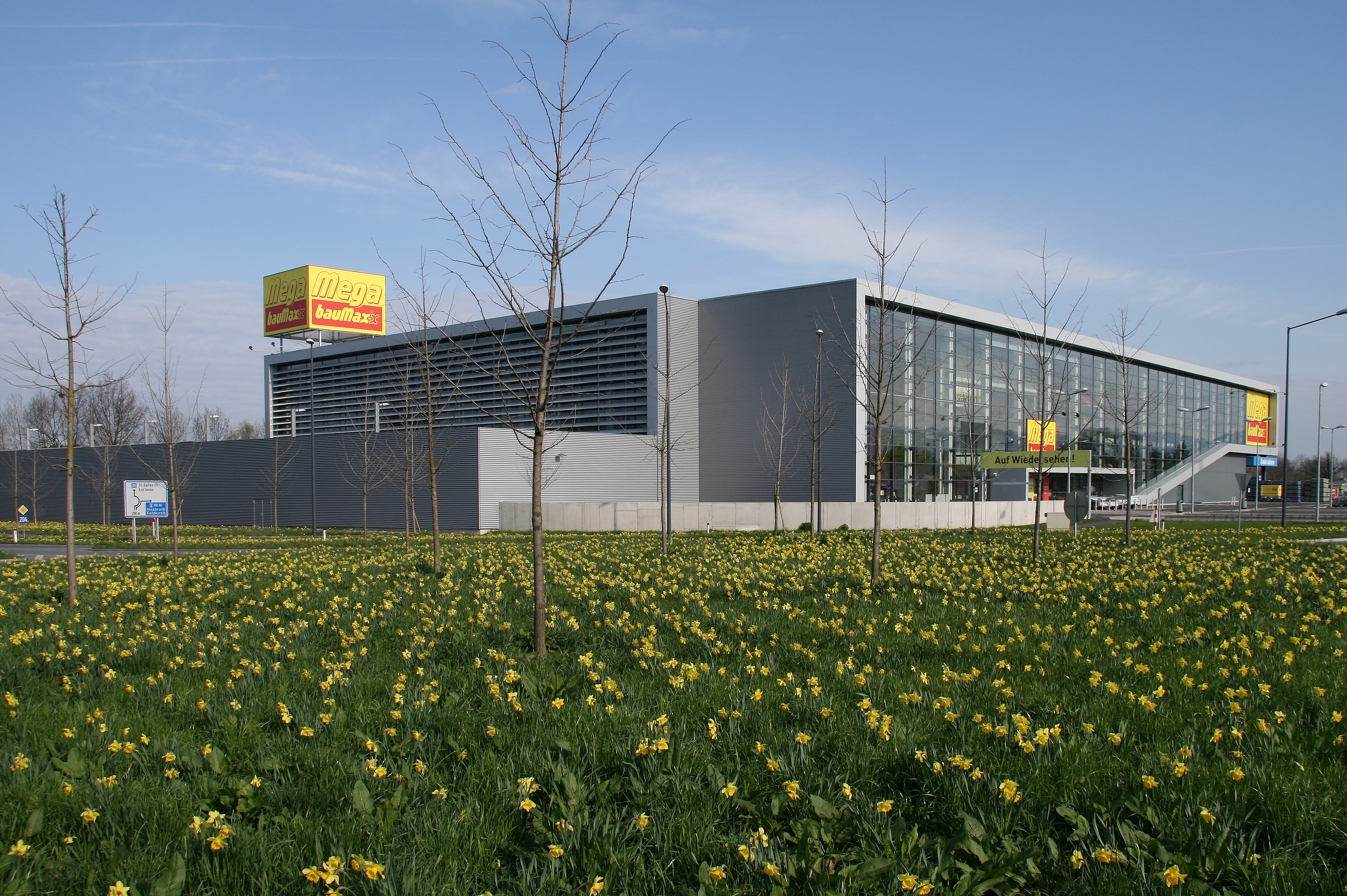
bauMax store in Dornbirn, Austria

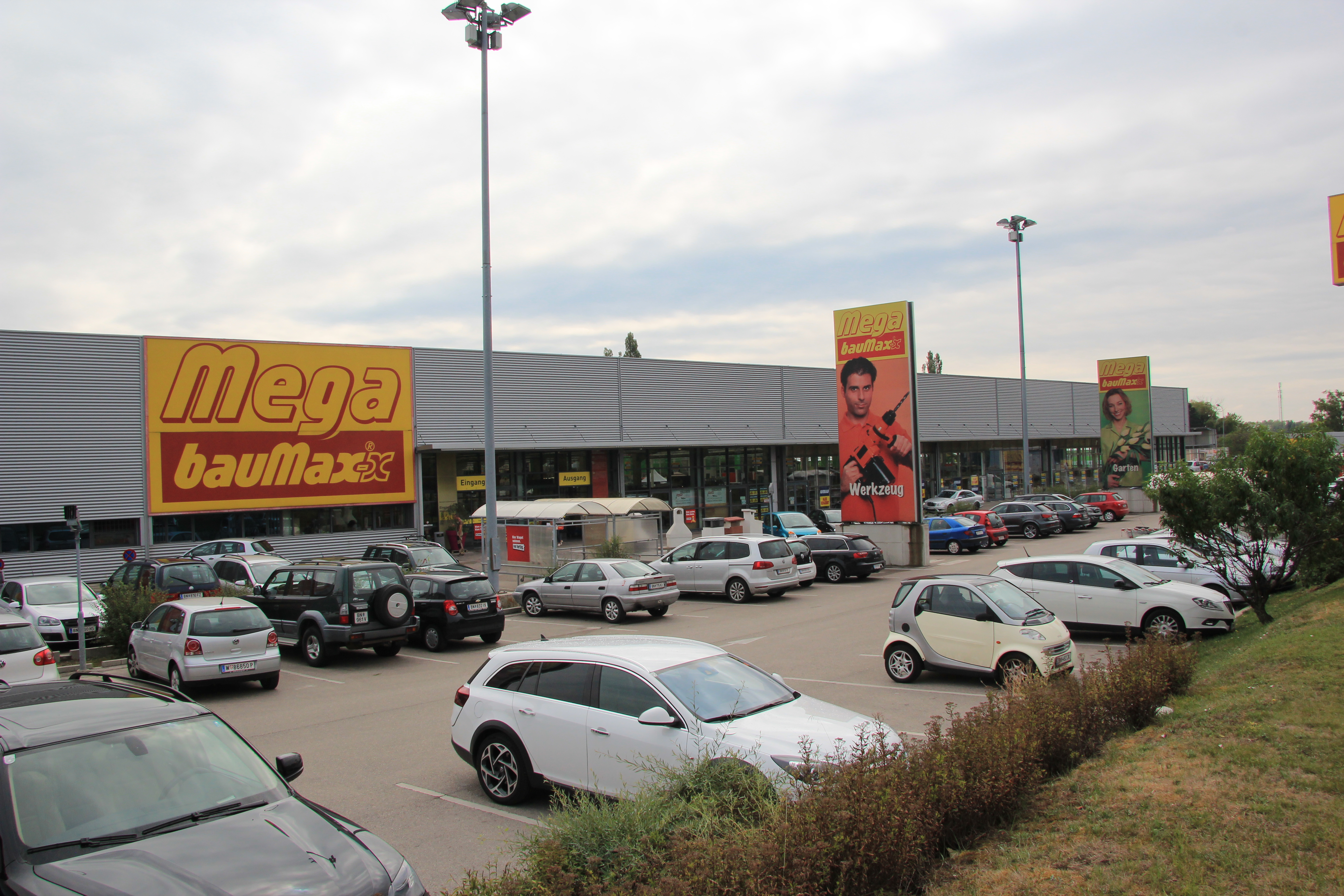
bauMax store in Baden, Austria

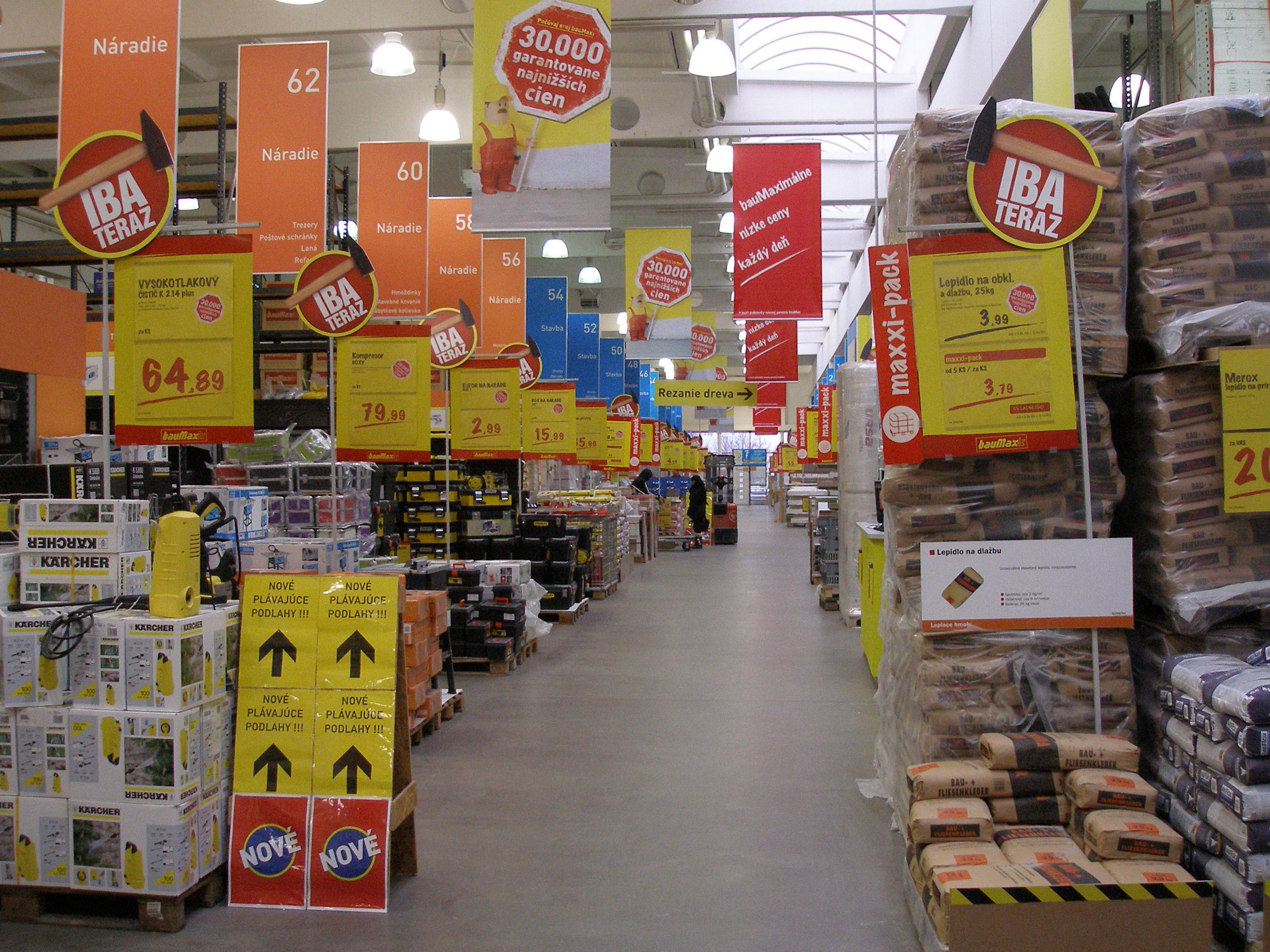
Interior of a store in Prešov, Slovakia

In 1958 Karlheinz Essl Sr., son of a food wholesaler from Carinthia, went to the City of New York to study the principle of self-service stores of American supermarkets. Back home he decided to transform the building materials business of his father-in-law into self-service operation by 1976. The concept proved successful, and by the mid-1980s, the company was the clear market leader in Austria.

Immediately after the fall of the Iron Curtain, Mr. Essl faced the crumbling facades of the former Eastern Bloc countries and realized that he had found a huge new market for his building supplies. Already in 1992 the first stores were opened in the former Czechoslovakia. Within the next 20 years, more than 50 additional stores were erected in Slovenia, Hungary, Romania, Bulgaria, Croatia and Turkey. By 2010, Baumax operated 160 stores in nine countries and employed over 9,000 people.

In 1999, Karlheinz' son Martin Essl became CEO, but the former still interfered heavily with daily business and met most of the operational decisions. This constitution became particularly problematic as Karlheinz Essl proved unable to cope with the task of running a business of such size properly. Moreover, he was almost immune to any suggestions and did not have any belief in his management staff at all.

As competitors had increasingly caught up by the early 2000s, Baumax' profit margins eroded. The company faced a lack of financial resources for their expansion plans which was increasingly compensated by large bank loans. When the world economy was hit by the Great Recession and sales declined in many markets, the company ran into financial turmoil. In 2011, the Baumax Group lost 57.2 million euros, in the following year another 126 million euros. At that time, creditors forced the board to elaborate plans for turning the company around, whose contents reached the general public by 2014.

According to these papers, the Baumax Group had more than one billion euros of debt, one out of three stores generated a net loss, often without any chance of significant improvement. Particularly, many of the foreign subsidiaries would have had to make losses for years until they would reach their break-even point. Without proper measures the company would have had to face bankruptcy by early 2014.

The reasons for the crisis were not primarily due to the unfavorable macroeconomic developments, but were based on errors of management. The papers stated an "unclear target group orientation with an uncoordinated price and assortment policy" that had developed due to "deficiencies inside the management organization." The company priced too aggressively and had too few brands within their range of products. Stores were not located wisely and their sales areas were too different in size to enforce a groupwide uniform store concept. Moreover, the organization had not kept up with the increasing size of the business; even 20 years after expansion into foreign countries had begun, there was no centralized management in many areas.

Despite all those difficulties management continued its strategy of expansion and opened yet further stores. However, after another huge loss in the fiscal year of 2013, the Essl family had to withdraw from office and Baumax fell to the creditor banks, who finally decided to break up the company. The subsidiaries in Romania and Bulgaria were sold, the stores in Turkey, Hungary and Croatia were closed. By the end of August 2015 it was announced that the German DIY chain Obi would take over 70 Baumax stores (of which 49 are located in Austria, 14 in Slovakia, two in Slovenia and five in the Czech Republic) for nearly €200 million.

In 2015 Polish DIY chain Merkury Market took over 18 of 24 Baumax stores in the Czech Republic and continuously operates all acquired stores under the Baumax brand. 78

== Subsidiaries ==
Country	First store	No. of stores	Fate
Austria	1976	65	49 stores sold to Supernova and rebranded to OBI, 6 to Hagebau and 1 to Hornbach.
Czech Republic	1992	24	18 stores sold to Merkury Market and 5 to Supernova and rebranded to OBI.
Hungary	1992	15	Sold all stores to furniture chain XXXLutz.
Slovakia	1994	14	All stores sold to Supernova and rebranded to OBI.
Slovenia	1995		All stores sold to Supernova and rebranded to OBI.
Croatia	2000	7	Insolvent and closed stores in 2014. In 2016 stores were sold to Tokić.
Romania	2006	15	Sold all stores to Groupe Adeo and rebranded to Leroy Merlin.
Bulgaria	2008	8	Sold all stores to investor Haedus JSC and rebranded to HomeMax.
Turkey	2010	7	Closed stores in 2014.
