= Maximilian C. Jehuda Ewert =

German musician

Maximilian C. Jehuda Ewert (born 1974, Soltau, Germany) is a composer and violinist. He studied both in Augsburg with John van Buren, and later on at the Hochschule für Musik Würzburg with Heinz Winbeck.

His music was performed in countries like Argentina, Canada, France, Israel, Austria, Norway, Switzerland and the United States. His compositions have been awarded in 1999 by the International Brahms-Competition of the ZEIT-Foundation and in 2006 by the Oslo Grieg Society. From 2001 until 2002 he was in residence of the Cité internationale des arts in Paris, by a scholarship of the Bavarian government. At the meantime he was an active violinist, playing in several orchestras, among them the Russian chamber-philharmonics Saint Petersburg and –as a concertmaster- at the Opéra-Comique in Paris. Since 2001 Ewert stayed often in Argentina, where he worked together with Oscar Nicolas Fresedo and others, performances of his tangos established him in Buenos Aires. 2006 - 2008 he attended the courses for composition of José Manuel López López, since 2008 he also studies with Walter Zimmermann. In 2007, he was invited by Moritz Eggert to write for the young Lyons concert of the A•DEvantgarde festival in Munich. He was teaching at the Berlin University of the Arts; in the same year he achieved an order by the International Days of Music in Kassel, where the Arditti quartet performed his work. In 2008, the Center for Art and Media Karlsruhe (ZKM) also performed works by Ewert. Currently he lives in Montrouge, Paris, as a freelance composer.
