= Soltau =

- Town
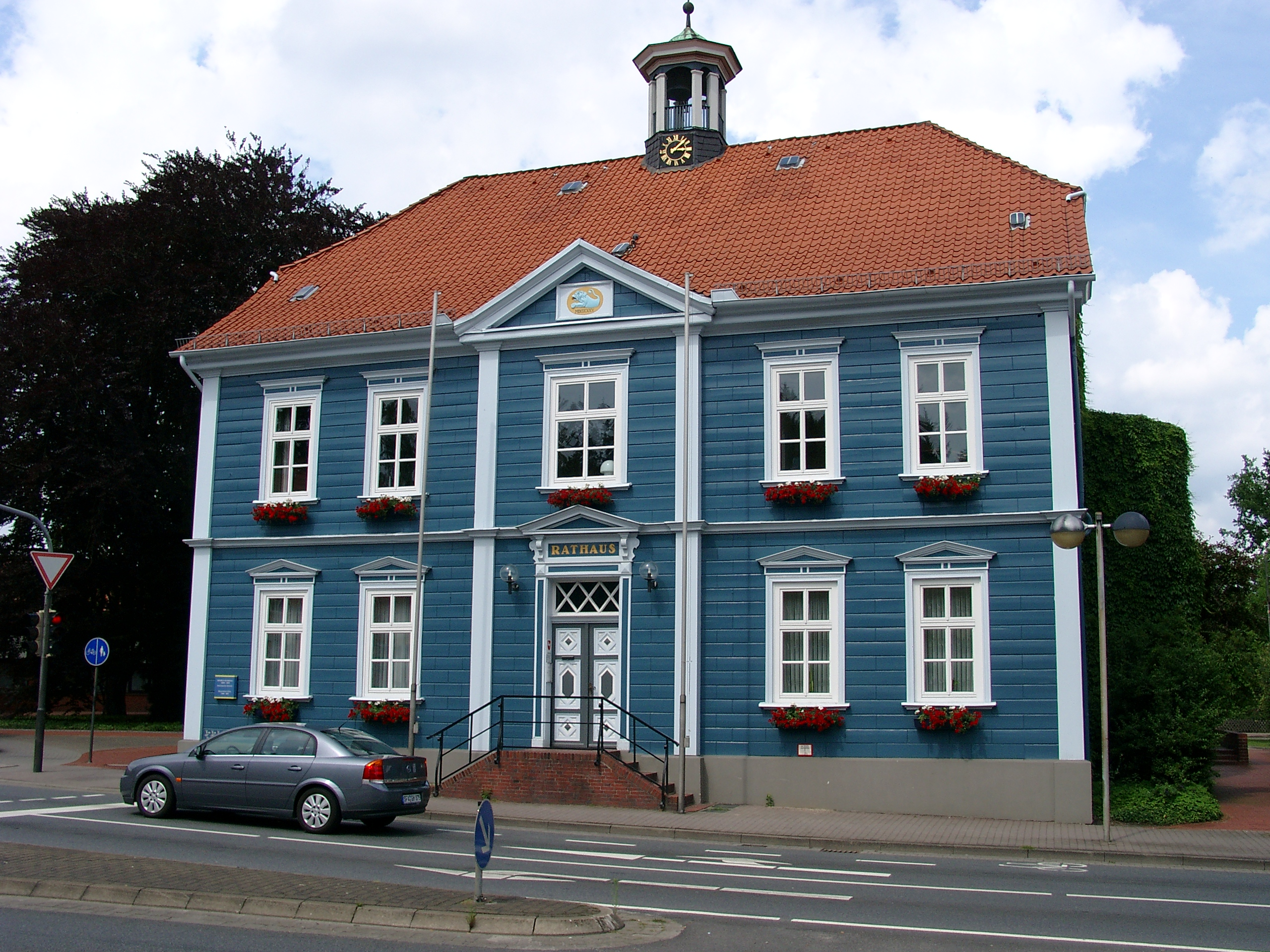
- Old town hall

- Flag Coat of arms

- Location of Soltau within Heidekreis district
- Interactive map of Soltau
- Location within Germany Location within Lower Saxony
- Coordinates: 52°59′N 9°50′E
- Country: Germany
- State: Lower Saxony
- District: Heidekreis

Government
  - Mayor (2021–26): Karsten Brockmann (Ind.)

Area
  - Total: 203.77 km^{2} (78.68 sq mi)
- Elevation: 57 m (187 ft)

Population (2025-12-31)
  - Total: 22,522
  - Density: 110.53/km^{2} (286.26/sq mi)
- Time zone: UTC+01:00 (CET)
  - Summer (DST): UTC+02:00 (CEST)
- Postal codes: 29614
- Dialling codes: 05191
- Vehicle registration: HK
- Website: www.soltau.de

Soltau (German pronunciation: [ˈzɔltaʊ]) is a mid-sized town in the Lüneburg Heath in the district of Heidekreis, in Lower Saxony, Germany. It has around 22,000 inhabitants. The city is centrally located in the Lüneburg Heath and is known nationwide especially for its tourist attractions like the Heide-Park and the Soltau-Therme.

== Etymology ==
The name Soltau comes from Solt (salt) and au (meadow).

== Geography ==
=== Location ===
Soltau lies between Bremen, Hamburg and Hanover in the Lüneburg Heath on the rivers Soltau and Böhme.

=== Subdivisions ===
The municipality of Soltau has 16 Stadtteile (population in brackets as at 1 July 2003):

1. Ahlften (513)
2. Brock (158)
3. Deimern (198)
4. Dittmern (783)
5. Harber (1,291)
6. Hötzingen (332)
7. Leitzingen (62)
8. Marbostel (112)
9. Meinern (320)
10. Mittelstendorf (160)
11. Moide (39)
12. Oeningen (149)
13. Tetendorf (202)
14. Wiedingen (142)
15. Woltem (307)
16. Wolterdingen (1,012)

=== Climate ===
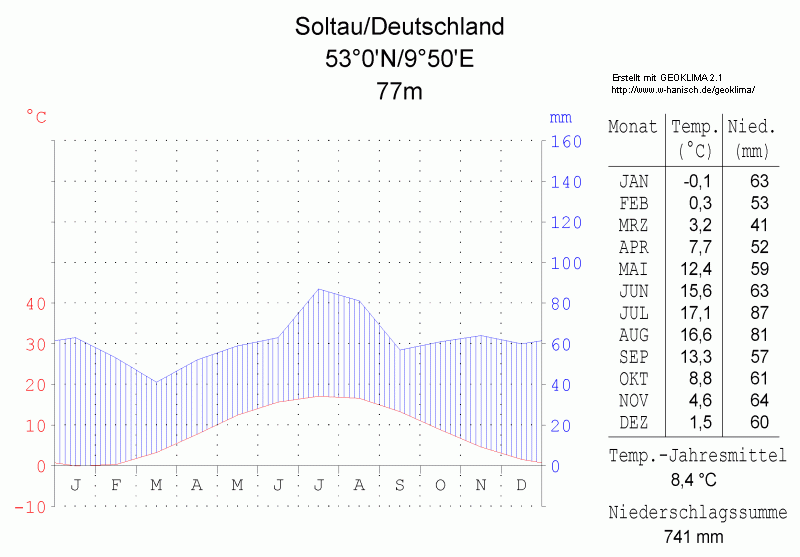
Climatic diagram for Soltau

Climate data for Soltau (1991–2020 normals)
Month	Jan	Feb	Mar	Apr	May	Jun	Jul	Aug	Sep	Oct	Nov	Dec	Year
Mean daily maximum °C (°F)	3.9 (39.0)	4.9 (40.8)	8.8 (47.8)	14.4 (57.9)	18.6 (65.5)	21.3 (70.3)	23.7 (74.7)	23.4 (74.1)	19.0 (66.2)	13.5 (56.3)	7.7 (45.9)	4.5 (40.1)	13.6 (56.5)
Daily mean °C (°F)	1.5 (34.7)	1.9 (35.4)	4.6 (40.3)	9.0 (48.2)	13.1 (55.6)	16.0 (60.8)	18.1 (64.6)	17.6 (63.7)	13.8 (56.8)	9.4 (48.9)	5.2 (41.4)	2.4 (36.3)	9.4 (48.9)
Mean daily minimum °C (°F)	−0.8 (30.6)	−1.0 (30.2)	0.7 (33.3)	3.6 (38.5)	7.3 (45.1)	10.4 (50.7)	12.7 (54.9)	12.4 (54.3)	9.1 (48.4)	5.6 (42.1)	2.4 (36.3)	0.0 (32.0)	5.2 (41.4)
Average precipitation mm (inches)	75.7 (2.98)	59.8 (2.35)	58.8 (2.31)	43.0 (1.69)	57.4 (2.26)	65.5 (2.58)	82.8 (3.26)	71.1 (2.80)	62.6 (2.46)	64.9 (2.56)	62.9 (2.48)	77.0 (3.03)	786.3 (30.96)
Average precipitation days (≥ 1.0 mm)	18.8	16.7	15.5	13.2	13.1	14.5	15.4	15.7	13.9	16.4	18.0	19.3	191.3
Average relative humidity (%)	87.8	84.3	79.0	71.3	70.0	72.4	72.9	75.0	80.9	85.5	89.2	89.5	79.8
Mean monthly sunshine hours	41.9	66.5	116.0	174.8	210.4	200.4	213.1	196.8	150.0	106.7	47.0	33.0	1,539
Source: World Meteorological Organization

== History ==
=== Middle Ages ===
The region of the Lüneburg Heath had already been settled by the start of the New Stone Age about 4,000 years ago. The Soltau area was initially occupied by a few individual farms. The parish of Soltau was probably founded around 830 and the first wooden church Sante Johannis Baptista (St. John the Baptist) was built.

The first written record of Soltau was in the year 936 as Curtis Salta ("farm on the salt meadow"). King Otto the Great granted the estate to Quedlinburg Abbey. Within a span of almost 600 years the village of Soltouwe emerged from Curtis Salta. It was located in the area between St. John's Church and the Waldmühle mill.

In 1304 the Vogtei of Soltau was sold to the cathedral chapter of Verden. Between 1383 and 1388 the village was established by order of the duke as protection against robber barons at the confluence of the rivers Böhme and Soltau near Hagen and Burg, which today is in the town centre. Subsequently, it was decided to demolish the castle there as part of the peace treaty at the end of the Lüneburg War of Succession; at the same time Soltau was given town rights on 15 July 1388 by way of compensation. In 1400 the letters patent for the guild was issued, which entitled the town to trade. In 1440 another letters patent was specifically conferred on blacksmiths, tailors, cobblers, linen and cloth-makers.

The consequences of the war of succession in Soltau can clearly be traced and prevented the rapid growth of the new town; conditions were miserable and many farms were ruined. Moreover, Soltau was a long way from the centres of power, so did not receive much direct support and there were no local lords who felt an association with it.

In 1479 Soltau became part of the Duchy of Brunswick-Lüneburg and an Amtsvogtei was established. In 1511 the town was totally destroyed by fire.

The last known cavalry battle took place in June 1519 on the 'Wiehe Holt' near Soltau and is known as the Battle of Soltau, which represented the high point of the Hildesheim Abbey Feud. According to long tradition it was only thanks to a ruse by the Soltau townsman, Harm Tyding, who pretended to the advancing Brunswick troops that he knew the whereabouts of a large Lüneburg army and led them on a detour, that the town was not destroyed again.

The Reformation saw little conflict in Soltau as a result of the firm stand taken by the Lüneburg duke, Ernest I and his commitment to introducing the Protestant-Lutheran faith in 1527.

=== Modern era ===
In 1533 the town hall was established in an old chapel in Marktstraße but it was destroyed in a fire. In 1567 another great fire destroyed large parts of the town. In 1588 the first school building was erected, although the first records of school teaching go back to as early as 1563. The plague raged in 1626 and the population dwindled dramatically. Before 1620 there were several years of legal disputes about the acquisition of building land outside the town wall.

In the Thirty Years' War Soltau was once again entirely destroyed. All that remained was a great ruin in the landscape and only one building from that time remains. It was a long time before the town recovered from the war's consequences. The traces of the war and the area's occupation by Swedish troops, which began in 1632, is still documented today by the Ellinger Grenzstein ("Ellingen Boundary Stone").

Market rights and therefore the right to host two fairs a year and a horse market were conferred in 1668. The Old Town Pharmacy (Alte Stadtapotheke) was opened in 1796, the first chemist in Soltau.

Soltau first became a garrison town in 1712, a year when the first cloth factory was built. Napoleonic troops occupied the town in 1803 and turned it into a French border town for the Kingdom of Westphalia in 1810. Soltau belonged to the Canton of Harburg in the Department of Bouches-de-l'Elbe. In 1813 the Lützow infantry and cossacks ended ten years of occupation. In 1826 the Old Town Hall (Altes Rathaus) was built on Poststraße.

In 1873 the first railway through Soltau was opened, the line which linked Bremen and Berlin. It was followed in 1901 by the Heath Railway between Hamburg and Hanover and, in 1912, the lines of the East Hanoverian Railways to Celle and Lüneburg. In 1885 Soltau became a district town (Kreisstadt). In 1896 the gas works was built and, two years later, the gymnasium and shooting hall.

On Christmas Eve 1906 a fire destroyed St. John's Church which had been mentioned in the records since 1464. It was then rebuilt and is still standing today. In 1911 the Lutheran Church was consecrated, the second Protestant church to be founded, and in 1915 the Catholic Church of St. Mary's followed. A royal officers' riding school was founded in 1913.

Soltau Camp (Lager Soltau), the largest German prisoner-of-war camp of the First World War was built in 1914. In the same year the mining of potassium salts (Kalisalz) began at the Heinrichssegen Shaft; it had to be halted only four years later as a result of the war, after having reached a depth of just six metres. From 1934 several Wehrmacht units were quartered at Wolterdingen Camp (Lager Wolterdingen) and after the end of the Second World War it was used to house refugees and forced labourers until about 1960. In April 1945, the town was partly destroyed by air raids, in which there were many more civilian victims than military ones.

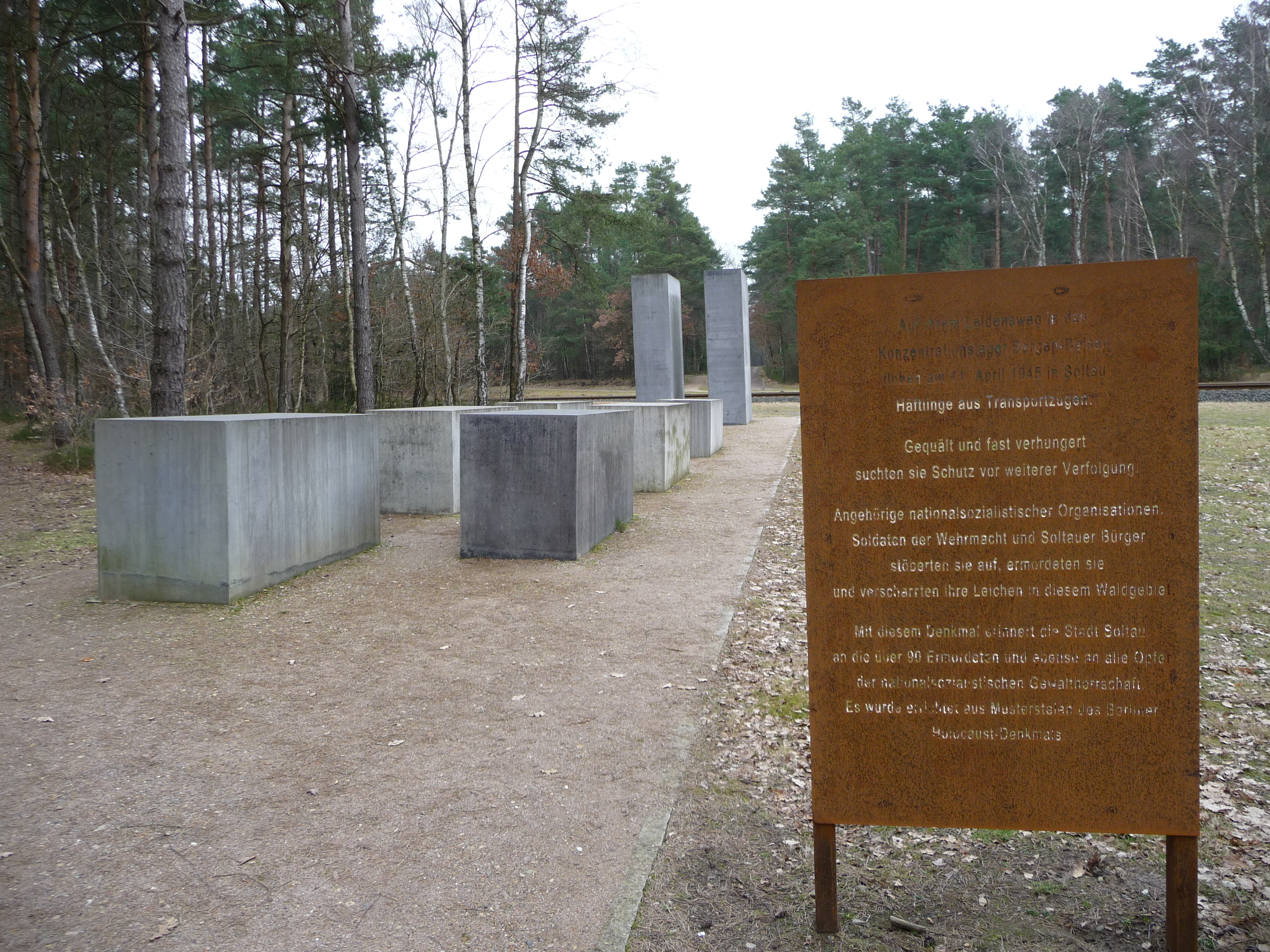
Holocaust Memorial

That same month, prisoners from concentration camps were able to escape from a railway train that had been stopped in Soltau as the result of an Allied air attack. The prisoners were hunted down by members of the Wehrmacht, SS and Hitler Youth, with the help of several townsfolk, and 92 of them were shot dead. A few townspeople, by contrast, risked their own lives by providing the escapees with food and clothing. The post-war trials of those who took part ended in acquittals due to the lack of evidence. Consequently, all that could be recorded were several confirmed killings, but not murders.

=== Post WW-II ===
In 1949 Soltau became a British garrison during the Cold War and home of Headquarters 7th Armoured Brigade. They were based at the former SS Riding School on the outskirts of town (Reitschule). The base was the home of 207 Signal Squadron and 11 Ordnance Company. It was the most northerly posting for any British serviceman in BAOR (British Army of the Rhine), excluding minor outposts like Dannenberg, Hamburg and Kiel, in what was known as West Germany. Armoured vehicles were regularly seen on the streets on their way to the military training area at Lüneburg and the HQ was responsible for the nearby Soltau-Lüneburg Training Area and its associated hutted camp at Reinsehlen. The signal squadron had three troops, two of which were armoured, using variants of the FV432 for telecommunication purposes. The soldiers were given the freedom of the town on 18 September 1982, and again after returning from the first Gulf War in 1991. They marched through the town to mark the occasion.

The site of the British barracks was the first in Germany to be turned over to private hands in 1993, one year after the withdrawal of British troops. Today the old barracks is a business centre, used for doctors' practices and social institutions. It is also home to the Alte Reithalle ("Old Riding Hall") Event Centre which has become an important indoor event location after its finished restoration in 2003.

In 1972 Soltau became a state-recognised spa and in 1987 was designated as a "state-recognised town with brine cure facilities". In the administrative reforms of 1974 16 surrounding villages were incorporated into the new municipality. In 1977 the districts of Soltau and Fallingbostel merged into the district of Soltau-Fallingbostel; Soltau lost its status as the district administrative seat.

The Heide Park was opened in 1978; today it is the largest amusement park in North Germany. Other tourist attractions include the Soltau Thermal Baths, which opened in 1990 and the North German Toy Museum which followed in 1994. In 1988 the Showpalast ("Show Palace") was founded at the Soltau secondary modern school (Hauptschule); it remains Germany's only schoolchildren's cabaret.

In 1998 a retail park opened in the Alm industrial estate. From 1996 there were discussions in Soltau about the construction of a 10,000 m^{2} (110,000 sq ft) outlet store. The town failed several times in the courts, the last time in 2006 at the Federal Administrative Court of Germany. Protests were led by the surrounding towns of Verden, Rotenburg and Lüneburg]. In 2006 proceedings were begun to obtain permission to deviate from a planning objective which would enable the construction of an outlet centre in spite of the latest rejection. With a change to the state regional development programme in 2008 the establishment of a factory outlet centre in the tourist region of the Lüneburg Heath was finally granted. For the purposes of the town of Soltau, the town of Bad Fallingbostel and the municipality of Bispingen regional proceedings were begun. In February 2009 this process was concluded by the supreme state planning department (State Ministry of Economics) producing a positive outcome for Soltau and a negative one for its two competitors. Construction was due to start in 2010 despite Bispingen launching an appeal. It was due to open in spring 2012.

On 20 October 2004 an earthquake shook the region. It had a strength 4.5 on the Richter Scale and its epicentre was in Neuenkirchen. There had been a previous earthquake of strength 4 with an epicentre in Soltau on 2 June 1977.

Since the beginning of 2005 there have been discussions about a memorial of eight representative steles from the Berlin Holocaust Memorial for "all victims of the Nazi dictatorship". However an internet survey by the newspaper, the Böhme-Zeitung showed that a majority of those who responded were against the memorial. This caused a furore nationally and gave those in favour of a memorial reason to accuse the opponents of having Nazi sentiments. Nevertheless, plans to erect the monument in central locations such as immediately in front of the station could not be carried out. This monument appeared from autumn 2006 to March 2007 in the vicinity of the remote site of the killings in the forest of Sibirien (today a hospital stands on the exact spot). The massive opposition from long-time residents of Soltau is frequently put down by them to the lack of commemoration of the many civilian and military victims from their own ranks, because they are not obviously included in the memorial.

In March 2007 a concept for the transformation of the town centre was proposed. The Schaper Market, which had been built in the 1970s and lain empty since 2004, a footbridge (locally called the Fenner-Kringel) and a multi-storey car park were demolished in 2008 and the theatre moved to Hagen, so that a new building could be built with a total sales floor of about 4,000 m^{2} (43,000 sq ft). The new shopping centre was opened in March 2009.

== Demographics ==
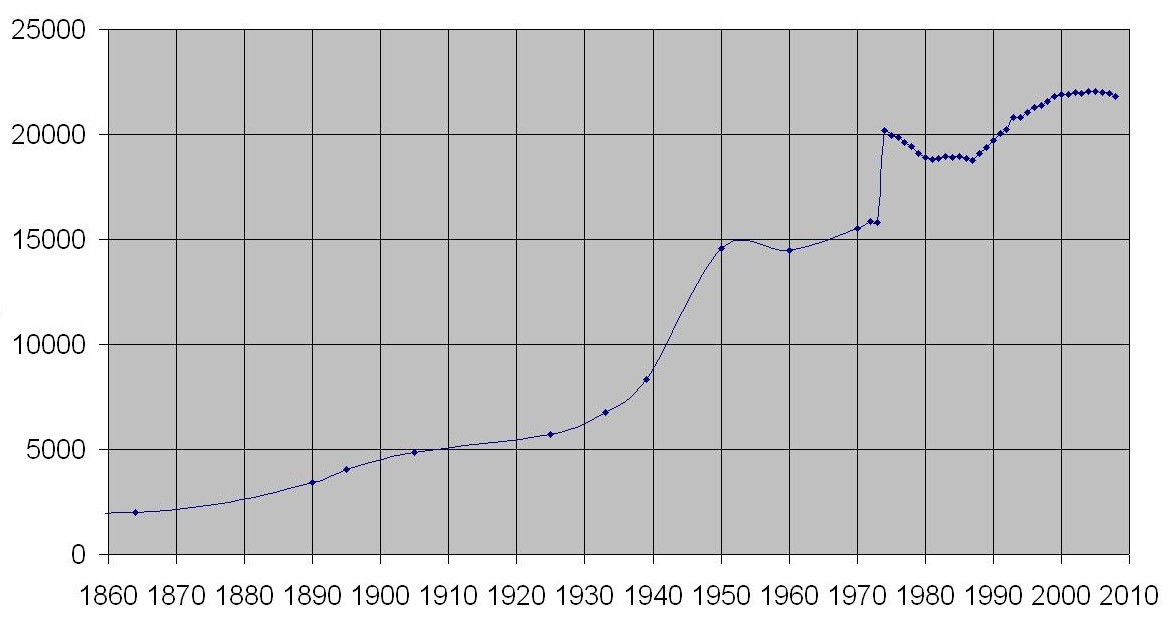
Population growth from 1860 to 2008

The oldest list of townsfolk in the town book of 1452 enumerates 42 households in Soltau, this represents a good 200 inhabitants based on the conditions of the time. Around 1600 there were about 100 households in Soltau, this corresponds to some 500 inhabitants who lived in about 70 houses. The black death raged in 1626 and caused the population to plummet dramatically. After that, the number of inhabitants rose slowly at first; accelerating from 1940. In 1821 Soltau had 1.024 inhabitants. The large increase in 1974 is due to the regional reform and the incorporation of 16 surrounding villages. Following a short drop in the numbers the population grew again in the 1990s and reached its maximum in 2005 at 22,044. According to internal censuses the town has even greater numbers, e.g. in 2001 23,508, but this is mainly due to the inclusion of those with second homes. Since then the numbers have dropped slowly. This trend should stop in the next few years according to a study by the Bertelsmann Foundation. For 2025 the study forecasts a population of 21,614.

Year	Population
1452	c. 220
1600	c. 500
1626	c. 60
3 December 1864 ¹	2,000
1 December 1890 ¹	3,419
2 December 1895 ¹	4,025
1 December 1905 ¹	4,861
16 June 1925 ¹	5,723
16 June 1933 ¹	6,746
17 May 1939 ¹	8,318
13 September 1950 ¹	14,560
1 October 1960	14,483

Year	Population
30 June 1970	15,519
31 December 1972	15,873
31 December 1974	20,189
31 December 1980	18,921
31 December 1985	18,940
31 December 1990	19,714
31 December 1991	20,031
31 December 1995	21,040
31 December 2000	21,906
31 December 2005	22,044
31 December 2007	21,950
31 December 2008	21,831

¹ Population censuses

== Culture and places of interest ==
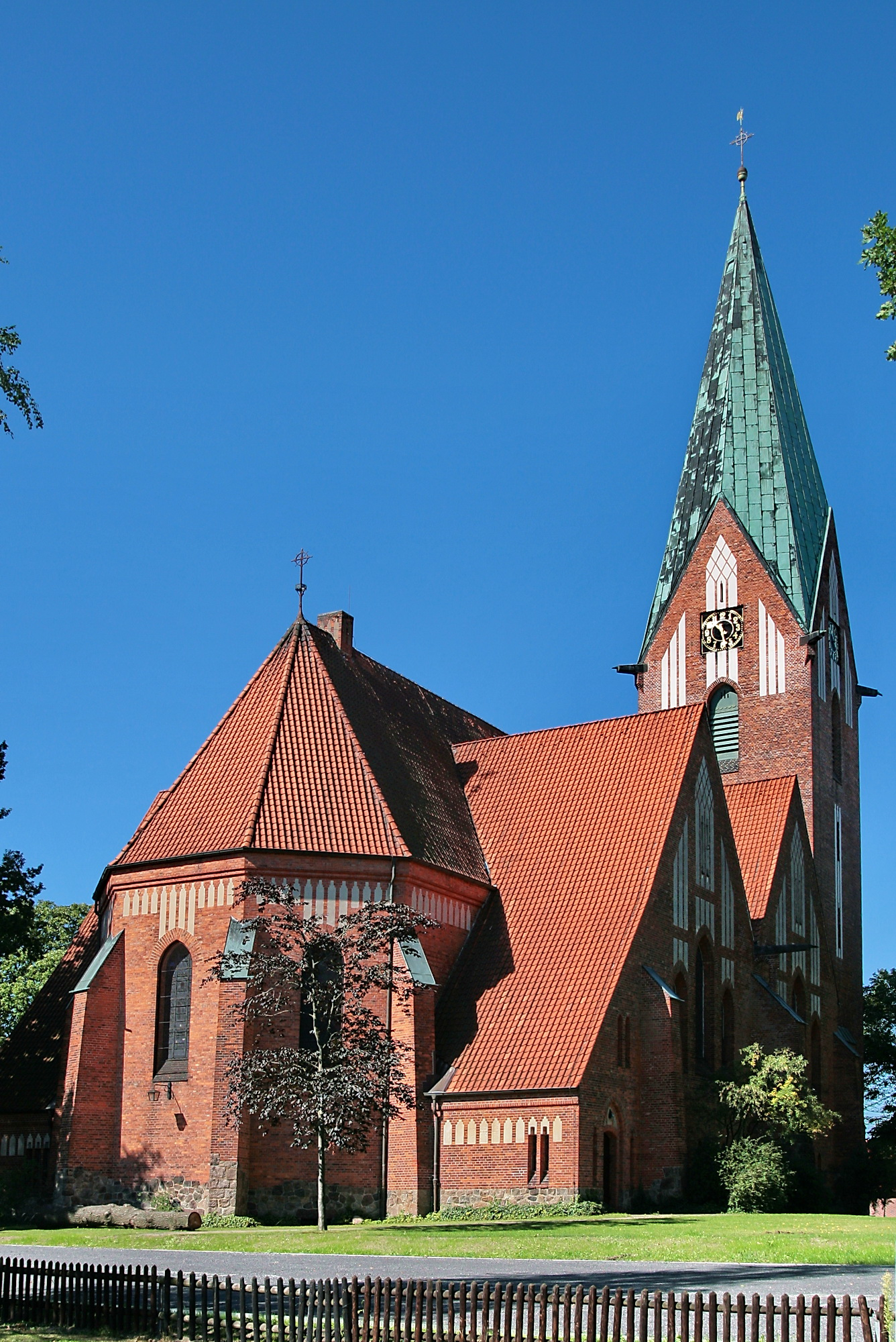
The Lutheran Church

=== Churches ===
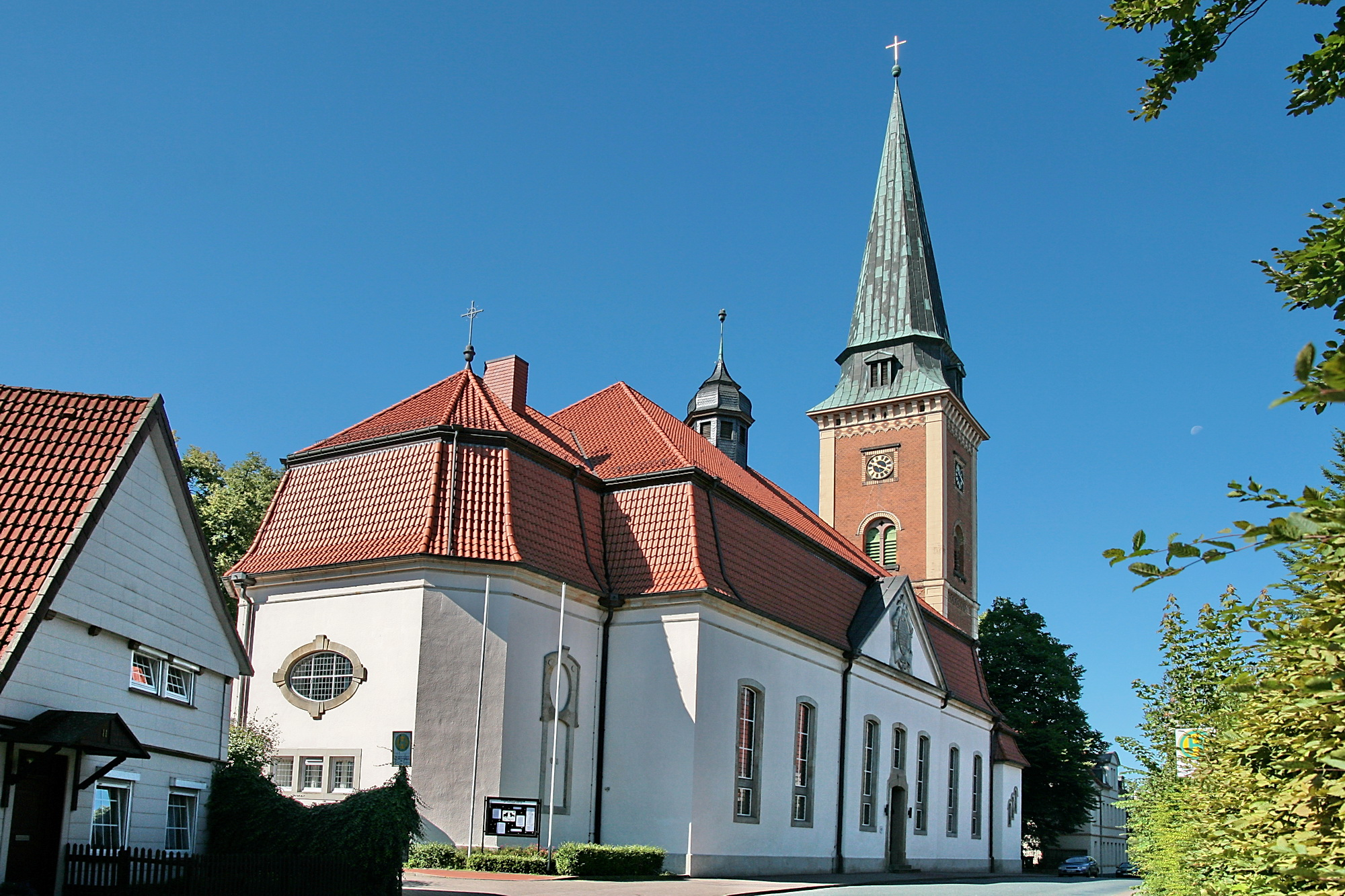
St. John's Church

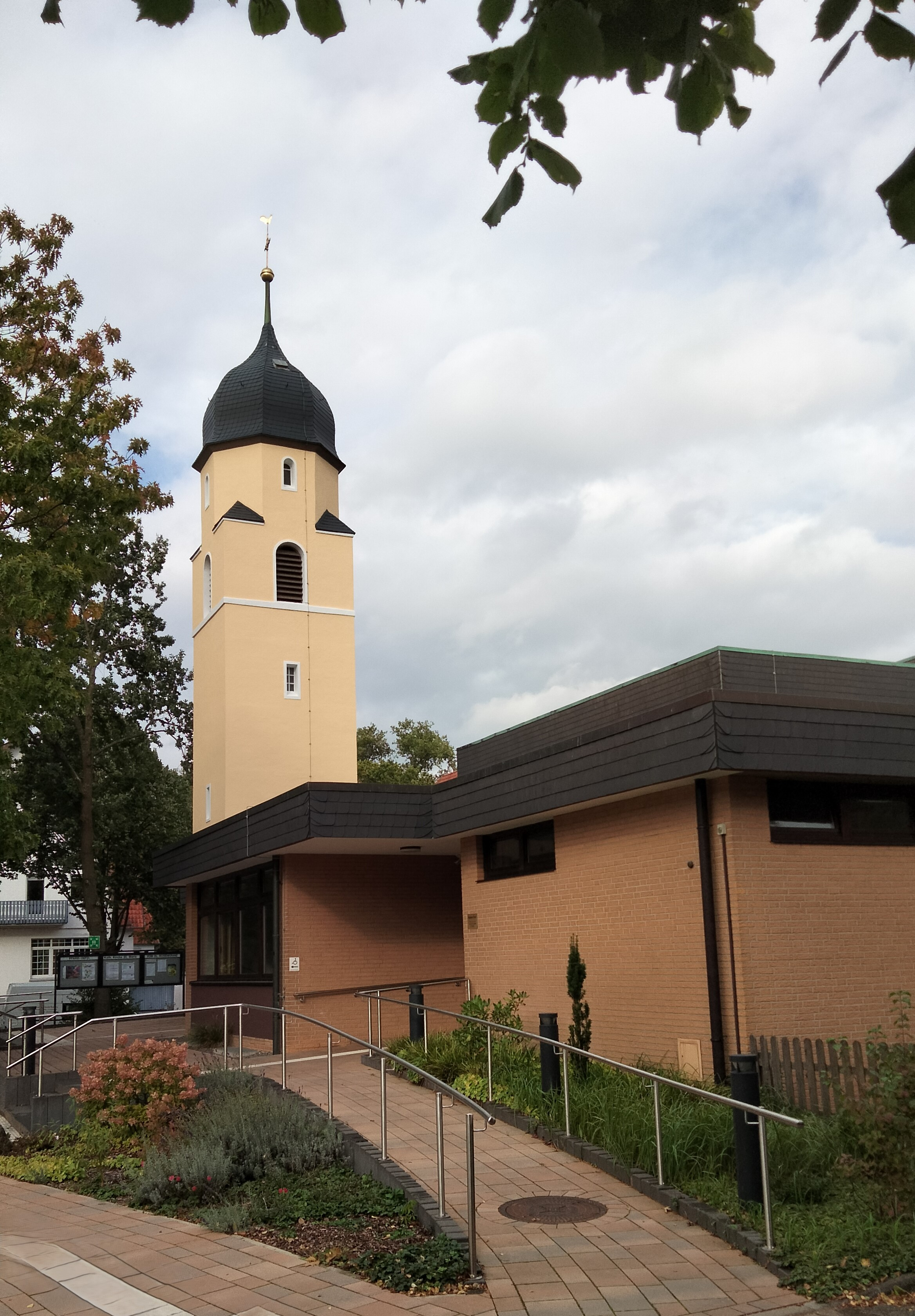
St. Mary's Church

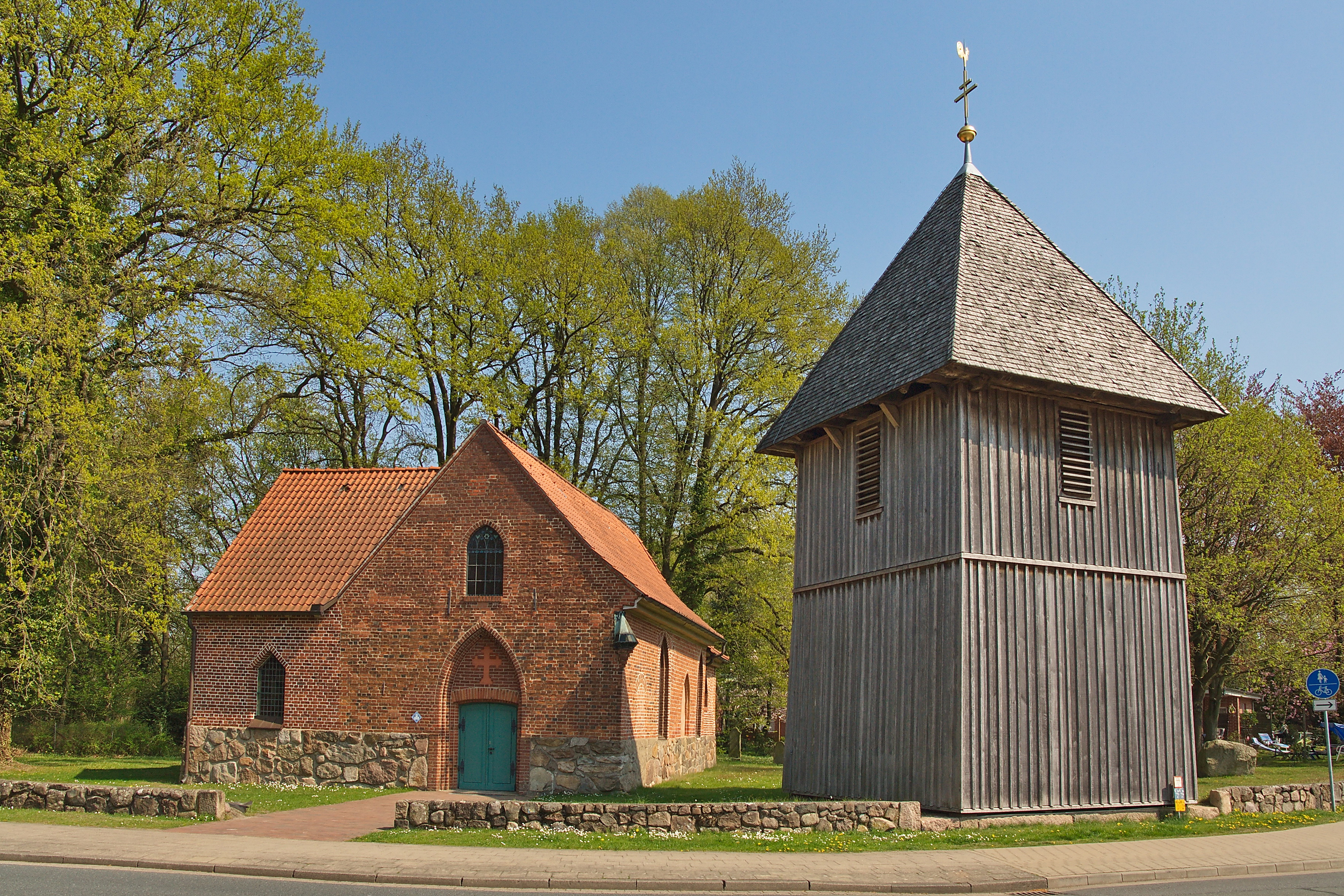
Village church of Wolterdingen

Soltau churches include St. John's, which was first mentioned in 1464 and rebuilt after a fire in 1908. The Lutheran Church was the second Protestant church to be built in Soltau (in 1911) after St. John's had burnt down in 1906 and only a small replacement was built. Other religious buildings are the Catholic St. Mary's Church with a tower built in 1915 and a nave dating from 1975. The Holy Spirit Church in Wolterdingen is an old heath church which was built in a brick gothic style and mentioned in 1396, and when it was renovated from 1998 to 2001 medieval wall paintings were discovered. The Heidenhof Chapel was built in 1349, and the Zion Church of the Independent Evangelical-Lutheran Church dates from 1888.

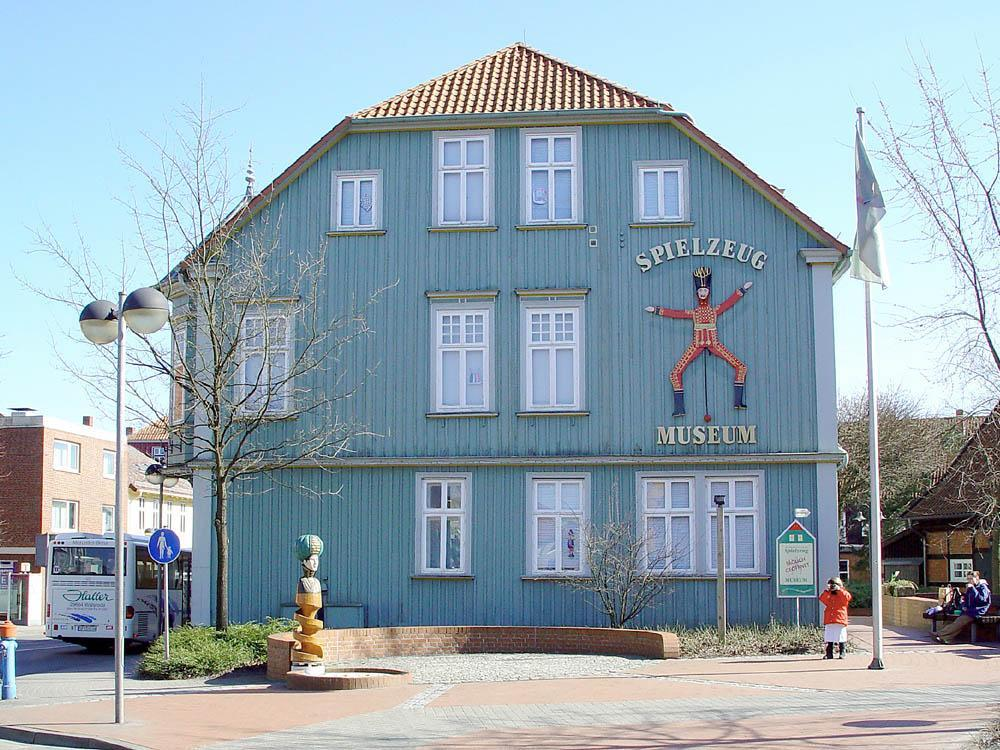
The North German Toy Museum in Soltau

=== Museums and leisure facilities ===
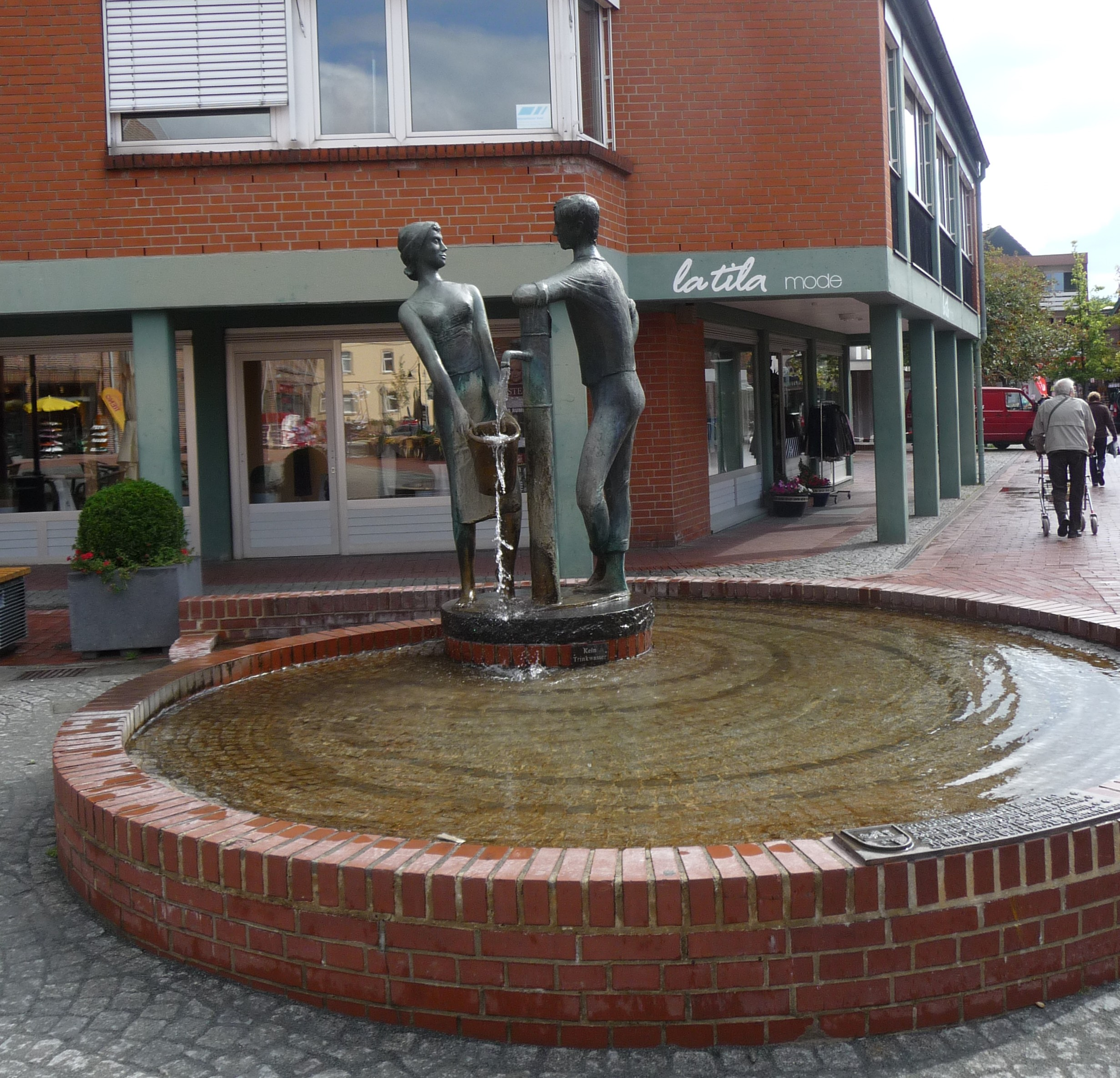
The Marriage Well in Soltau's town centre

Opposite the Old Town Hall in the centre of the town is the building housing the North German Toy Museum with 600 m^{2} (6,500 sq ft) of exhibition floor. The Soltau Museum in a half-timbered house dating from 1830 which was renovated in 1988 and 2002 demonstrates the history of the town. It also traces the (pre-)history of Soltau up to 200,000 years ago. The Salt Museum was founded in one of the oldest houses in Soltau.

In the surrounding region, the Heide Park amusement park is very well known. Other facilities are the Soltau Thermal Springs (Soltau-Therme) and the Hof Loh golf course. Breidings Garten is a municipal park with an artificial ruin in the town centre which was created in 1850.

Other sights are the Hagen with its drawbridge and the so-called Marriage Well (Heiratsbrunnen), which was built in 1978 by Karlheinz Goedtke, the Waldmühle Library and the Ratsmühle.

=== Parks, nature reserves and cemeteries ===
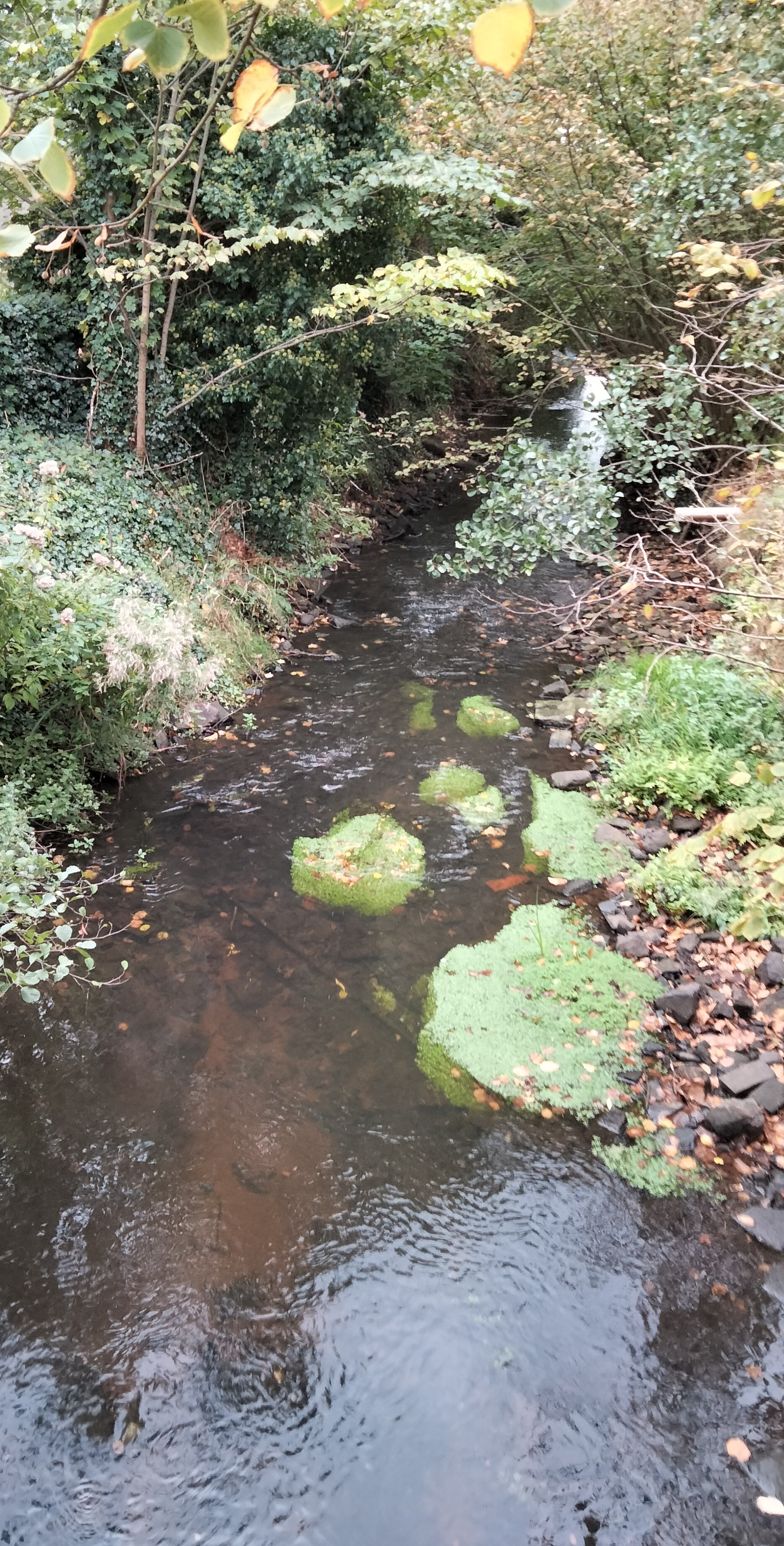
River Soltau in the centre of Soltau town at Marktstrasse

Near the centre of town is the Breidingsgarten, a landscaped park that is under heritage protection. It was laid out around 1850 along English lines and covers an area of 11 hectares (27 acres). Within the garden, next to a villa built in the Italian style is a ruined building, an old farmstead and fish and ornamental ponds. It is currently in private hands but may still be visited.

Other open spaces in the town include the Böhme Park and the Röders' Park am Halifax. Nearby recreation areas are the Wacholder Park, an area of heath with a sheep shed, the Ahlftener Flatt, a lake from the last ice age, which is popular for ice skating in winter, and the Kuhbach Forest. Around Soltau there are various woods belonging to the Soltau Abbey Forest (Klosterforst) covering a total of 14,500 hectares (36,000 acres) which is managed by the Soltau Abbey Forestry Department.

In Soltau's vicinity are several nature reserves: the Böhmetal bei Huckenrieth, Ehbläcksmoor and the Schwarzes Moor near Dannhorn.

Soltau has two cemeteries, the town cemetery and the forest cemetery. There are also the ruins of a Jewish cemetery in which people were interred from 1721 to 1926.

=== Culture ===
The Soltau Cultural Society and the Culture Initiative organise readings and concerts in the town on the Böhme river. Since 2008 the cultural week Zwischenspiel - Das Zelt has taken place annually, with readings, concerts, cabaret and theatre performances in a circus tent. There are also events by the Soltauer Gespräche ("Soltau Talks") and the Soltau Artists House that has admitted writers, painters or musicians since 1995. The Waldmühle Library takes part in the Summer Reading Club Project which is part of the Cultural Secretariat of NRW (Kultursekretariats NRW).

== Sports ==
The oldest sports club in Soltau is MTV Soltau, which was founded in 1864. Today it offers 16 different activities, of which football is the largest with four men's, a women's, four girls' and 15 boys' teams of all ages.

The second oldest club is SV Soltau, founded in 1912. Here, too, the main activity is football, but there are also many other activities. In 2002 a third football club, SG Inter Soltau, was started, but it disbanded after a few years.

The oldest tennis club is TC Blau-Weiß Soltau. Founded in 1952, it opened the first tennis courts in Soltau. There is also a second tennis club, TVC Soltau. In 1993 a table tennis club was started, TTC 93 Soltau.

Pool has been played in Soltau since 1987 at the Pool Billiard Sport Club Triangel. The club plays in the highest Lower Saxon league and takes part in several German tournaments.

There is also a Schützenverein (shooting club), the Schützengilde Soltau Stadt und Land, which held its first Schützenfests in the 15th century and, since 1741, has had a Schützenfest almost every year.

Soltau has another 20 or so smaller clubs offering around 30 different types of sport.

Sports facilities include an indoor and open-air swimming pool, six sports fields, eight sports halls, a riding hall, a golf course, three tennis courts, four nine-pin bowling alleys, a ten-pin bowling alley, squash courts, an inline skating facility, a polo field, a group of ponds for anglers and 2,000 square metres (22,000 sq ft) of indoor sports hall, the Heidewitzka.

The finals of the German water polo championships took place between 1960 and 1971 in Soltau. In addition since 2004 the Heide Park has been the annual venue for the canoe white water sprint as part of the Germany Cup. The Heide Park has also hosted, in April 2003, the World Wide Championship of LAN Gaming finals and in September 2006 the German qualifiers for the World Cyber Games 2006 in electronic sports and between 1997 and 2003 the annual pole-sitting world cup.

== Economy ==
=== Industry ===
Many industrial and trading companies have settled in Soltau. There is a wide range of firms in the metalworking and mechanical engineering sphere including: Röders-Tec (high-speed cutting milling machines, blow moulding, pewter), G.A.Röders (die casting, injection moulding, toolmaking), Röhrs AG (plant manufacturing, industrial building, power plant services), Saxlund International (hauling engines, pumps), Nortec (mechanical engineering) and Colt International (technical building protection).

In the food industry are firms like Harry-Brot (bread, cakes and pastries) and H&S Tee Pack Service (teabag packers) and in textiles: Gebr. Röders AG (felt) and Breiding (bedsprings) (founded 1836). In addition the firm of MVG Mathé-Schmierstofftechnik makes lubricants and the Greenpeace Energy Windpark generates electricity.

=== Trade ===
Soltau is the headquarters of hagebau (purchasing cooperative for building materials, wood and tile dealers) and JAWOLL (special deals market) and a distribution centre for the firm of Deichmann (shoes).

The building industry cooperative, ZEUS, has its main headquarters in the town as do the cattle and meat merchants of Raiffeisen Viehvermarktung Zentralheide and the SLC Container Terminal with 250,000 containers for Hamburg Harbour. From 1923 to the mid-1990s the headquarters of the Edeka Group was in Soltau; it has now moved to Minden.

=== Banks ===
Soltau is the base for the Kreissparkasse Soltau bank and, until 2008, for the Volksbank Lüneburger Heide. When the latter merged with the Volksbank Lüneburg, the head office moved to Lüneburg. There are also branches of Deutsche Bank and Postbank.

== Education ==
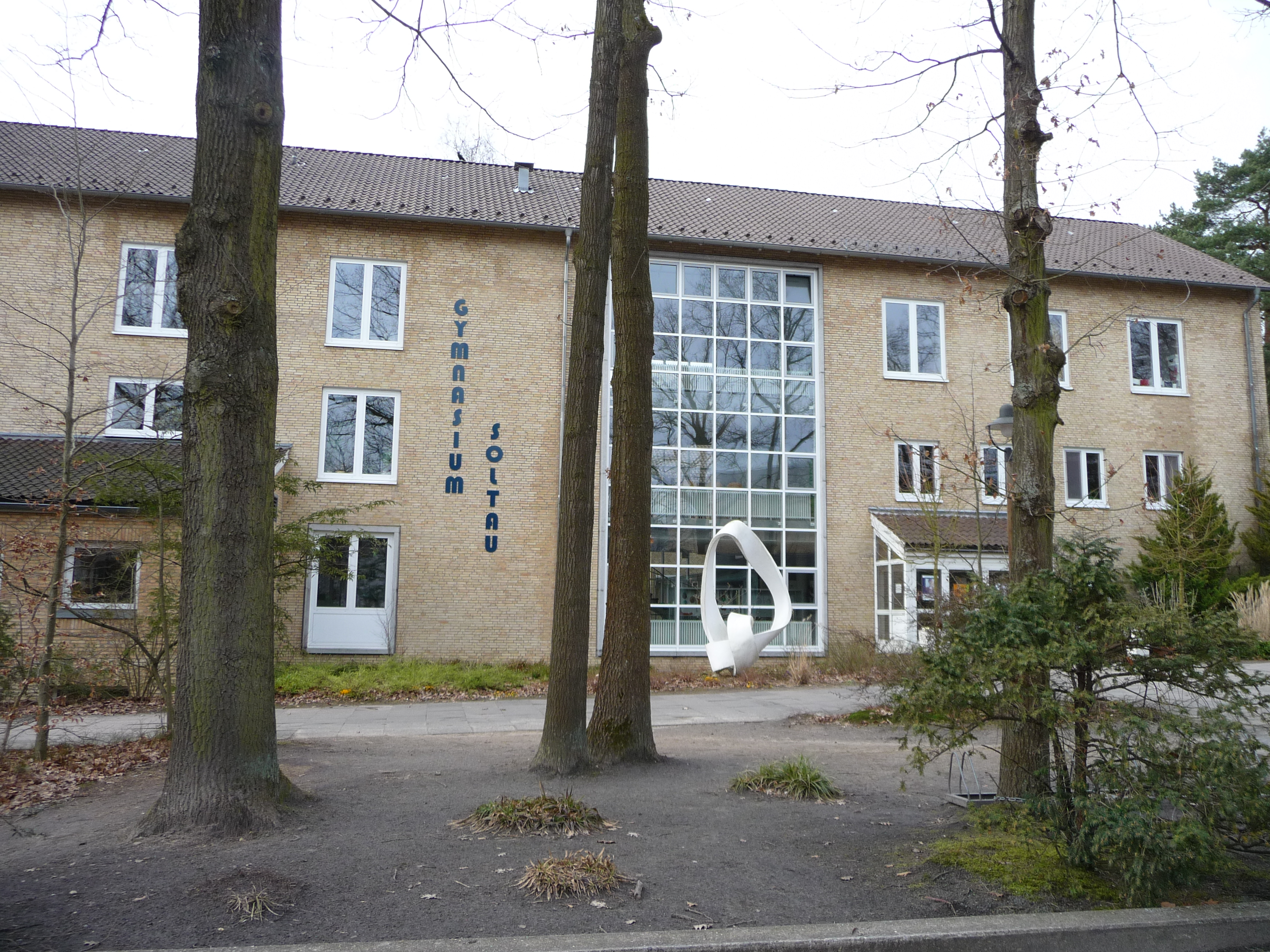
Soltau Grammar School

The first recorded school teaching took place in 1563 in the verger's living room. In 1588 the first school building was built by the church in Marktstraße, the first state school followed in 1844. The building in Mühlenstraße still houses the Freudenthal Primary School today. In 1894 townsfolk founded a higher private school. In 1923 a middle school was established.

Today Soltau has three primary schools (Grundschulen), a grammar school (Gymnasium) with just under 1,400 children, a middle school (Realschule), a secondary modern school (Hauptschule) and a special needs school (Förderschule). In addition the charity Lebenshilfe Soltau supports a special needs centre, a kindergarten for children with speech difficulties, a remedial kindergarten and a creche for early learners.

The Soltau Vocational School (Berufsbildende Schule or BBS) is a combined school with four different streams of education under one roof. There is a grammar stream specialising in economics, a technical high stream (Fachoberschule) for technology and economics, and numerous vocational courses in economics, information technology, technology, home economics, careworking, cosmetics, gastronomy, agricultural science, construction, woodwork, metalwork or hairdressing. About 2,400 schoolchildren attend.

The adult education centre (Volkshochschule) Heidekreis is based in Soltau and Walsrode and currently offers about 930 courses.

The Waldmühle Library is the largest in the district. The Heidekreis music school is also based in Soltau.

== Media ==
The Böhme-Zeitung daily newspaper has been going since 1864 with a print run of 12,116 copies (2nd quarter 2008). In addition there is the weekly free newspaper, the Mittwoch aktuell, with a circulation of 29,000 and the twice-weekly Heide-Kurier with 44,000 copies.

== Infrastructure ==
=== Transport ===
==== Rail ====
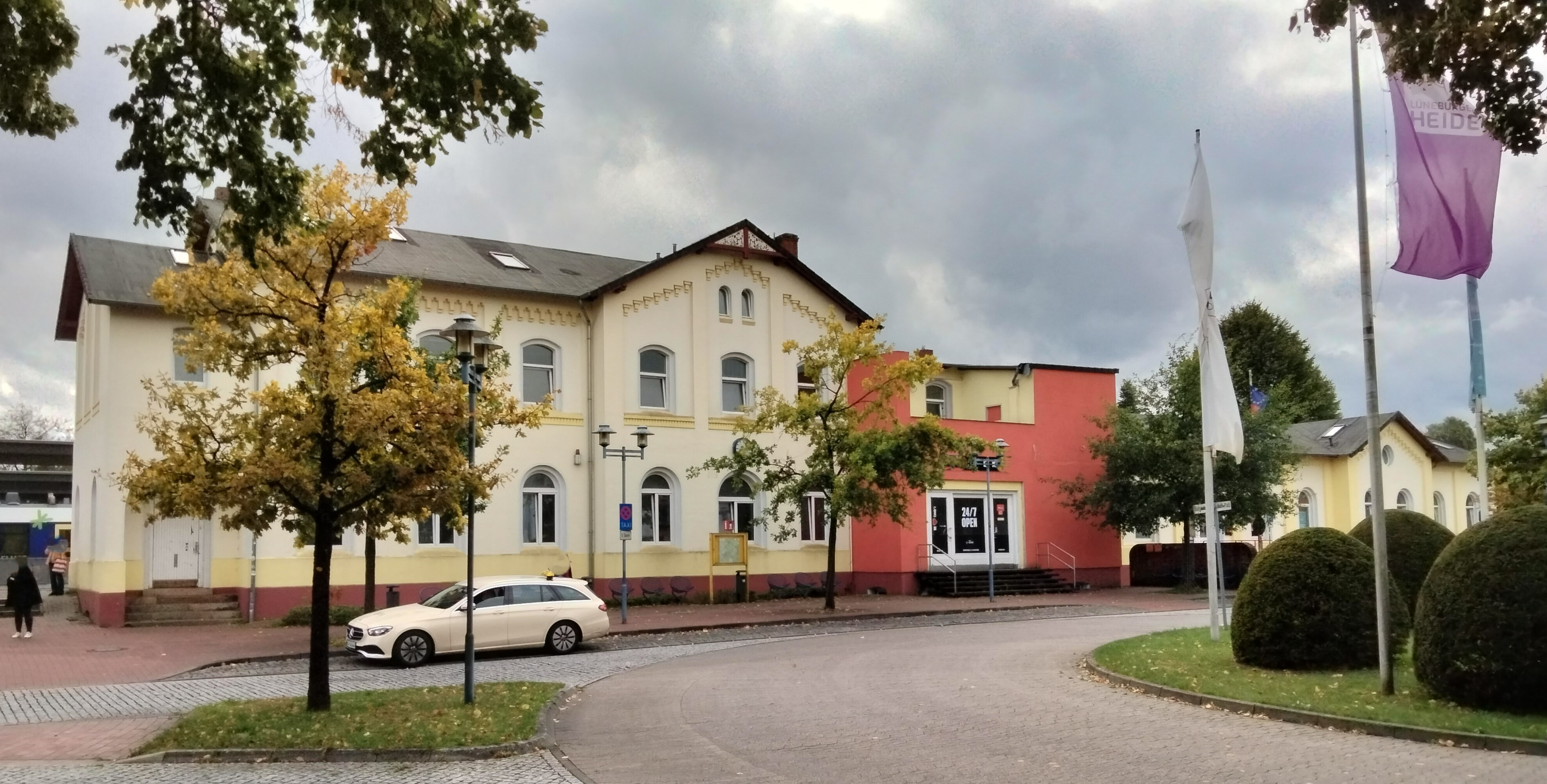
Soltau (Han) station

Soltau's station, which is still called Soltau (Hannover) (abbreviated to Soltau (Han)) by the Deutsche Bahn belongs to the Hanover Railway Division and lies on the Uelzen–Langwedel railway (KBS 116), part of the America Line, from Bremen to Uelzen and on the Heath Railway (Heidebahn) (KBS 123) from Buchholz (Nordheide) to Bennemühlen(-Hanover). There are two other stops - Soltau Nord and Wolterdingen - on the Heath Railway.

Soltau also has a goods station (Soltau Süd) in the OHE network with goods traffic links to Celle, Uelzen and Lüneburg. These routes also used to have regular passenger services. The Lüneburg Transport Society (Arbeitsgemeinschaft Verkehrsfreunde Lüneburg) occasionally runs passenger trains on these lines to Celle and Lüneburg under the name Heath Express (Heide-Express).

In summer there is also the Ameisenbär ("Anteater"), a historic Wismar railbus from 1937 that runs from Soltau via Bispingen to Döhle and back.

The old Soltau–Neuenkirchen railway has now been dismantled. Between 1998 and 2001 there was a roadrailer shuttle from Soltau-Harber to Verona in Italy which used to run several times a week for the firm of 'alli-Frischdienst' that used to be based in Soltau. The halt of Harber is now just used as a passing loop.

==== Roads ====
Since 1959 Soltau has had the motorway exits of Soltau-Süd and Soltau-Ost on the A 7 or E 45 autobahn. Other major roads include the Bundesstraßen B 3, B 71 and B 209 and the Landesstraße, L 163.

As well as the regular regional bus services run by the 'Verkehrsgemeinschaft Heidekreis', which links Soltau with the surrounding towns and villages, there is a free "experience bus" (Erlebnisbus) between July and October through the Lüneburg Heath, which links the numerous tourist sights in the region. The two routes of the Erlebnisbus have several stops in Soltau and at the Heide Park. In addition the coach line from Berlin to Cuxhaven via Magdeburg and Bremen operated by the 'Berlin Linien Bus-Gesellschaft' stops at the town every day. In the summer there are also direct bus links to the Heide Park from Hamburg, Hanover, Lüneburg and Celle.

==== Cycling ====
The long distance cycle paths RFW 4 (Leine-Heath Cycle Path) and RFW 15 (Heath Cycle Path or Heide-Radweg) on the Lower Saxon long distance cycle network intersect in Soltau. In 2003 a cycle path concept was developed and implemented. For example, cycle boxes were erected at the station and the cycle network was expanded. In Soltau there are four Bett & Bike ("bed and bike") places that are recommended by the ADFC as especially "cycle-friendly".

== Governance ==
=== Town council ===
The town council of Soltau comprises 34 councilors. As of the 2016 elections the councilors belong to the following parties or groups:

- CDU: 12 seats
- SPD: 9 seats
- Bürgerunion (Townsfolk's Union): 4 seats
- The Greens: 3 seats
- AfD: 3 seats
- dps (independents): 2 seats
- FDP: 1 seats

=== Mayor ===
Soltau has a directly elected mayor (Bürgermeister). The office is currently held by Olaf Klang (independent), elected in 2021.

=== Elections ===
For elections to the Landtag of Lower Saxony, Soltau is part of the constituency of Soltau together with the towns of Munster and Schneverdingen and the villages of Bispingen and Neuenkirchen.

For Bundestag elections Soltau belongs to various Bundestag constituencies:

Bundestag election	Constituency number	Name
1949, 1953, 1957, 1961	36	Harburg - Soltau
1965, 1969, 1972, 1976	30	Soltau - Harburg
1980, 1983	30	Soltau-Fallingbostel - Rotenburg
1987, 1990, 1994, 1998	30	Soltau-Fallingbostel - Rotenburg II
2002, 2005	36	Soltau-Fallingbostel - Winsen L.
2009	36	Rotenburg I - Soltau-Fallingbostel

=== Town twinning ===
Soltau is twinned with:

- (United States) Coldwater, Michigan, USA (since 1971)
- Laon, France (since 1972)
- Osterburg, Germany (since 1991)
- Myślibórz, Poland (since 1997)
- Grünberg in Schlesien/Zielona Góra, Poland, (since 1997)

=== Coat of arms ===
The coat of arms of Soltau shows the lion of the Welf dynasty behind a red city gate. The lion was part of the original town seal from around 1400 as the town belonged to the Dukes of Lüneburg, of the House of Welf. Later the lion was depicted lying on the town gate, since the 19th century it has been depicted behind the gate.

== Notable people ==
- Christian Benbennek (born 1972), German football coach
- Klaas Dijkhoff (born 1981), Dutch legal scholar
- Philipp Eggersglüß (born 1995), German football player
- Maximilian C. Jehuda Ewert (born 1974), German composer and violinist
- Marcel Gebers (born 1986), German football player
- Gustav Isernhagen (born 1937), German politician (CDU)
- Lars Klingbeil (born 1978), German politician (SPD)
- Klaus Lage (born 1950), German singer
- Marleen Lohse (born 1984), German actor
- Dieter Möhrmann (born 1948), politician (SPD)
- Thomas Ostermeier (born 1968), German theatre director
- Friedemann Schulz von Thun (born 1944), German psychologist
- Marcus Wedau (born 1975), German football player
- August Wöhler (1819–1904), German railway engineer
- Herbert Kappler, German war criminal
