= Deimern =

Coordinates: 53°1′52.82616″N 9°54′2.33″E

Deimern is a village in the borough of Soltau in the Heidekreis district in the German state of Lower Saxony. The village has a population of 198 (as at: 2003). The hamlets of Timmerloh, Harmelingen and Grasengrund belong to the parish of Deimern.

Deimern lies on the Lüneburg Heath northeast of Soltau. The district roads (Kreisstraßen) K 2 and K 3 cross near Deimern. The parish chairman is Jürgen Wallmann (as of 2019). The Ehbläcksmoor nature reserve is located in the parish.
