= Dieter Möhrmann =

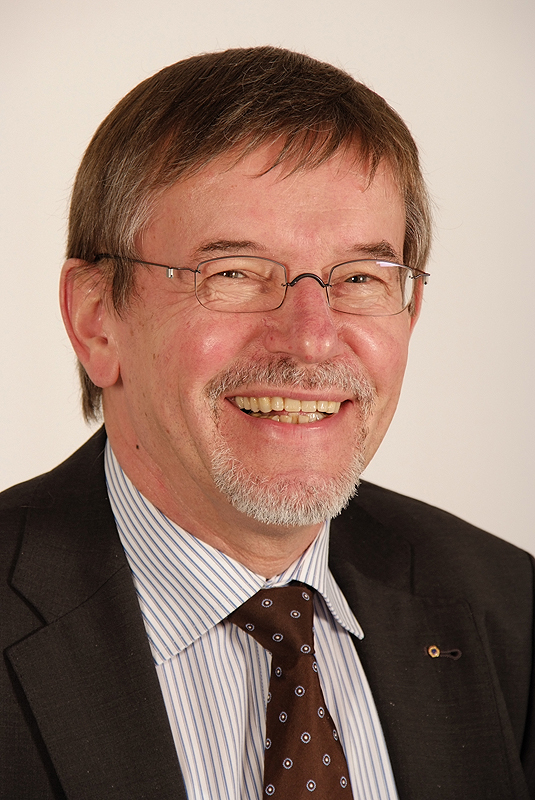
Dieter Möhrmann in November 2009

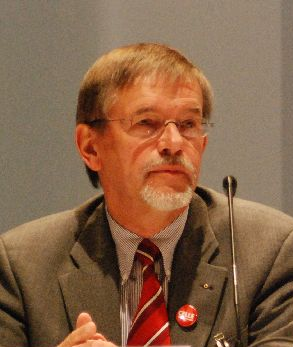
Möhrmann at the Lower Saxony SPD conference during the 2009 federal elections

Dieter Möhrmann (born 1948) is a German politician in the Social Democratic Party of Germany (SPD) and deputy speaker in the Lower Saxony State Parliament.

Möhrmann was born on 6 March 1948 in Soltau, Lower Saxony. After attending a middle school, Möhrmann underwent training as an industrial sales representative (Industriekaufmann) and then worked as a commercial clerk (kaufmännischer Angestellter). He then undertook further study, earning diplomas in business management and commerce. After that he was employed as a teacher in a school of commerce in Harburg.

In 1971 Dieter Möhrmann joined the SPD. Since 1972 he has been a member of the town council of Schneverdingen. From 1974 to 1991 he was chairman of the council's SPD group and, from 1991 to 1996, he was the Mayor of Schneverdingen. Since 1981 Möhrmann has been a member of the district council for Soltau-Fallingbostel; where he is chairman of the SPD group.

Möhrmann is a long-standing member of the Lower Saxon Parliament or Landtag (from 1982 to 1986 and since 1989). From 1999 to 2008 he was the chief whip for the SPD parliamentary group in the state parliament; since March 2008 he has been vice-president (deputy speaker) of the parliament. Dieter Möhrmann lives in Schneverdingen, is Evangelical-Lutheran, and is married with two children.

== Sources ==
- Barbara Simon: Abgeordnete in Niedersachsen 1946–1994. Biographisches Handbuch. 1996, p. 259.
