= Brock (Soltau) =

Coordinates: 52°56′34.161″N 9°50′29.48″E

Brock is a village in the borough of Soltau in the Heidekreis district in the German state of Lower Saxony. The village has 158 inhabitants (as at: 2003). The hamlets of Bassel, Hebenbrock, Penzhorn and Imbrock are part of the parish.

Brock lies on the Lüneburg Heath south of Soltau on the river Böhme. The B 3 federal road and the A 7 motorway run through the parish of Brock. The motorway junction of Soltau-Süd also lies within the parish.

The council chair is Wulf Heinrich Lühr.

The first two episodes of the TV series Die Kinder vom Alstertal were shot at a farm in Brock.
