= Gustav Isernhagen =

German politician (1937–2025)

Member of the Landtag of Lower Saxony
- In office 21 June 1982 – 20 June 1994

Personal details
- Born: 20 January 1937 Soltau, Gau Eastern Hanover, Germany
- Died: 8 October 2025 (aged 88)
- Political party: CDU

Gustav Isernhagen (20 January 1937 – 8 October 2025) was a German politician. A member of the Christian Democratic Union, he served in the Landtag of Lower Saxony from 1982 to 1994.

Isernhagen died on 8 October 2025, at the age of 88.
