= Soltau Toy Museum =

Museum in Germany

Coordinates: 52°59′14″N 09°50′20″E

The Soltau Toy Museum (German: Spielzeugmuseum Soltau), formerly the North German Toy Museum (German: Norddeutsche Spielzeugmuseum) in Soltau originated from a private collection. It was founded in 1984 by Hannelore Ernst.

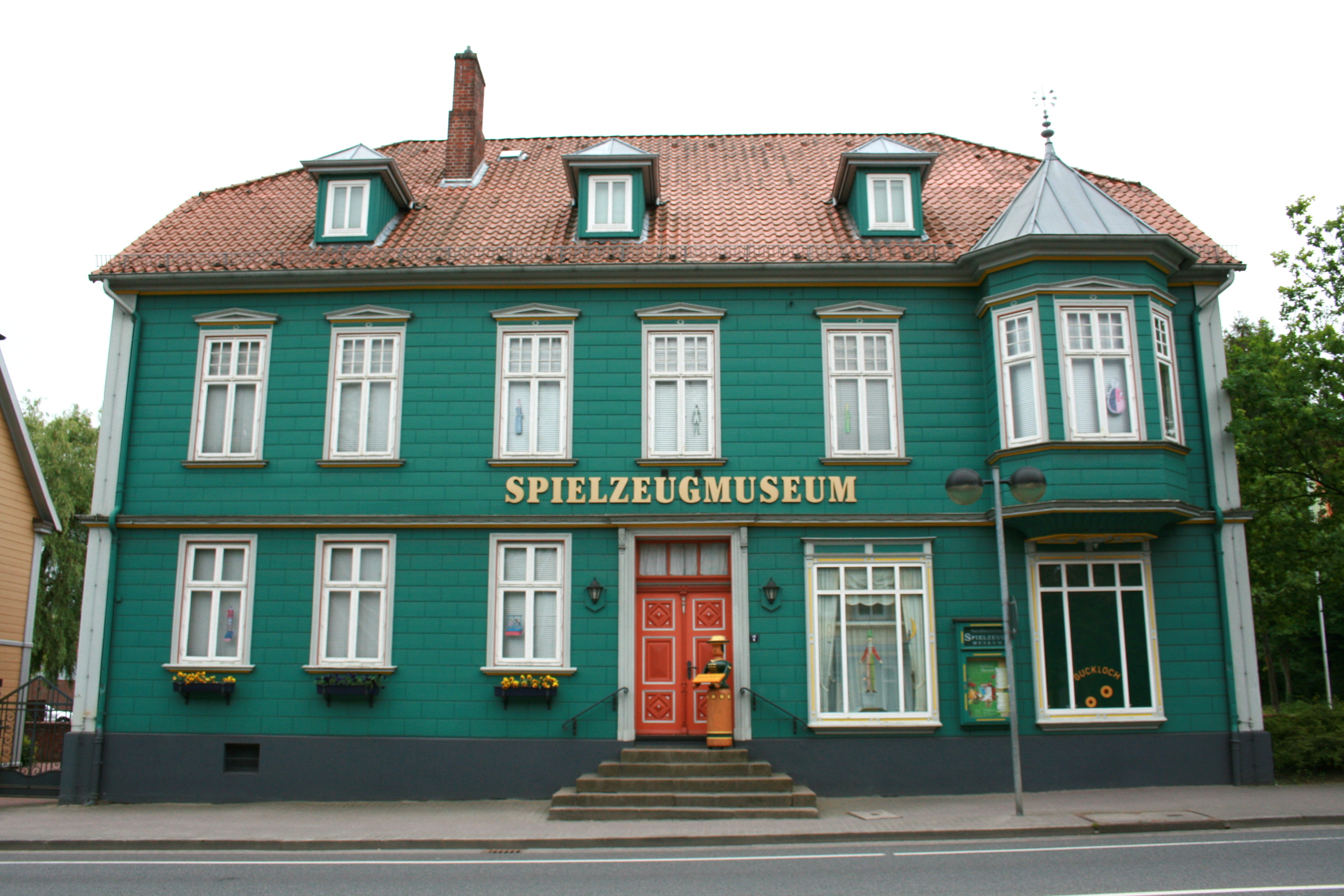
The Toy Museum in Soltau

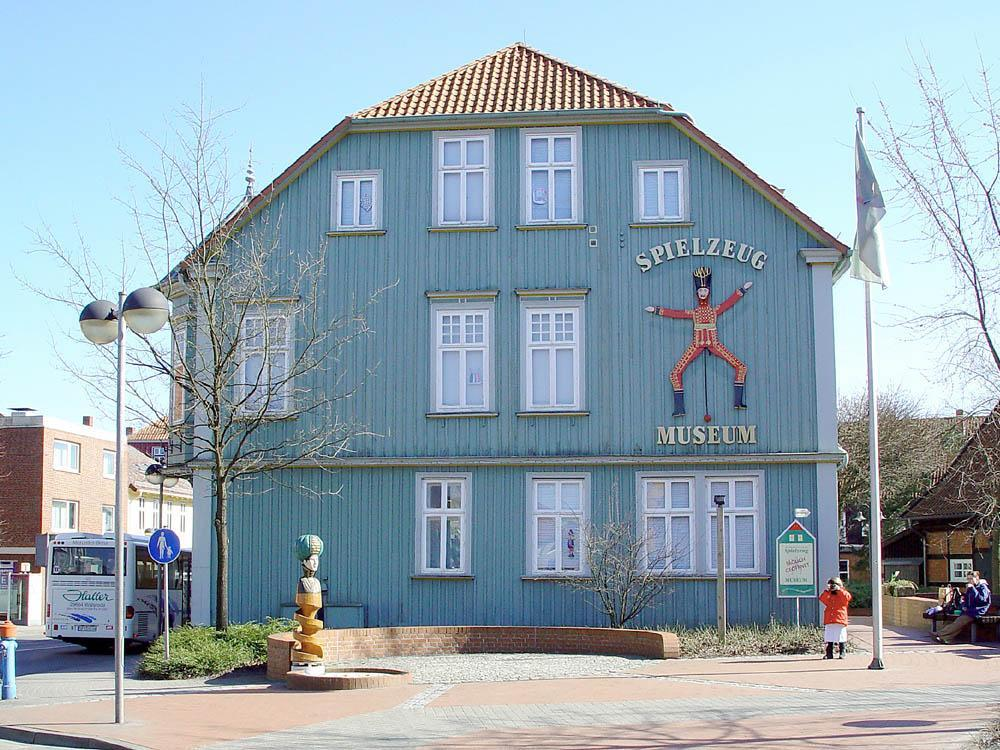
Side view

The museum is located in a listed building which consists of a shop and house in the centre of Soltau. Exhibits from four centuries recall something of the history of toys and culture. In addition to dolls made of the widest variety of materials there are doll's houses, rooms, kitchens and shops as well as model railways, and lead and wooden toys, Laterna Magica devices and a host of teddy bears and stuffed toys. There are also opportunities to play with some of the toys. The museum has a total area of 600 square metres and receives 40,000 visitors a year.

The pièce de resistance of the exhibition is Dingley Hall, a three-metre-wide (9.8-foot) and two-metre-high (6.6-foot) doll's house that was bought in 2003 for €190,000 at Christie's in London. This exhibit is, however, only part of a valuable collection that represents decades of work.

In order to ensure the continued existence of this important collection, a charitable foundation, the "Stiftung Spiel: Historisches Spielzeug - innovative Spielräume" was formed and has run the museum since 1 August 2005. The Ernst family has transferred its toy collection to the foundation.
