= Dittmern =

Coordinates: 53°0′53.2″N 9°54′39.5″E

Dittmern is a village in the borough of Soltau in the Heidekreis district in the German state of Lower Saxony. The village has 783 inhabitants (as at: 2003). The hamlets of Friedrichseck, Hambostel, Grüne Aue, Heidenhof and Höpenhof belong to the parish of Dittmern. The Low Saxon name for Dittmern is Dibbern.

Dittmern lies on the Lüneburg Heath northeast of Soltau on the Große Aue river. The district roads (Kreisstraßen) K 2 and K 9 and the A 7 motorway run through the parish. A motorway junction, Heideregion, in the vicinity of Dittmern, is currently being planned.

The parish chairman is Andreas Wagner-Wischhoff (as at 2008).

== Places of interest ==
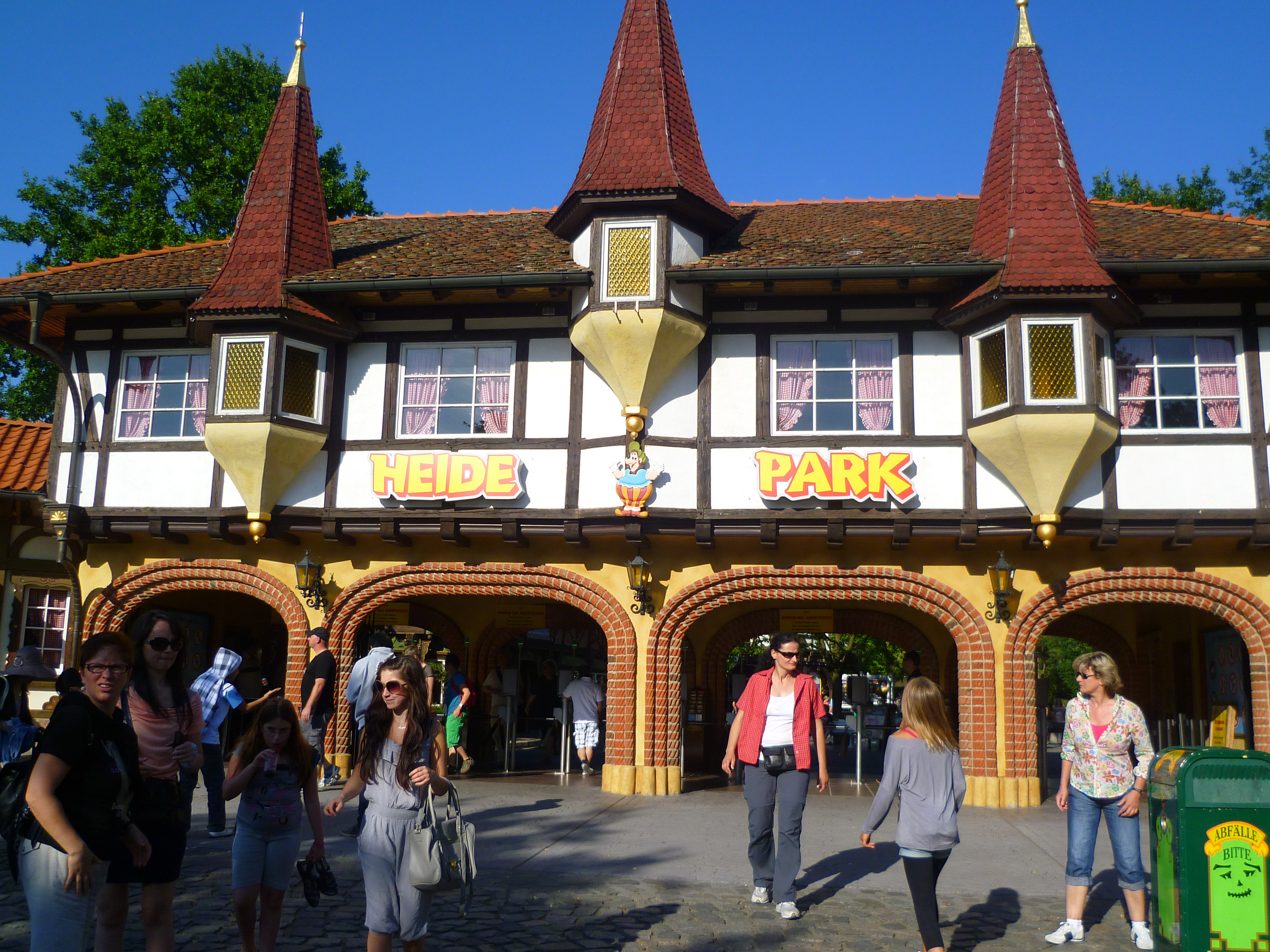
Entrance to the Heide Park

- The Soltau Heide Park, a very popular amusement park.
- The Heidenhof Chapel dating to 1349 in the Heidenhof, on the terrain of the Heide Park.
- Soltau Camp (Lager Soltau) the largest German POW camp of the First World War was on the site of the present-day Friedrichseck
