= Hagebau =

German retailers cooperative

- Native name: Hagebau Handelsgesellschaft für Baustoffe mbH & Co. KG
- Type: GmbH & Co. KG
- Industry: Building materials, DIY retail
- Founded: 1964; 62 years ago
- Headquarters: Soltau, Lower Saxony, Germany
- Area served: Europe
- Revenue: €6.17 billion (2024) (2024)
- Website: www.hagebau.com

Hagebau is a German retailers' cooperative of independent wholesale and retail companies in the building materials, timber, tile and garden sectors. It is based in Soltau, Lower Saxony, and was founded in 1964. In the 2024 financial year the group reported sales of about €6.17 billion.

== History ==
Hagebau was founded in 1964 by 34 building-materials merchants as a purchasing cooperative seated in Soltau. The first hagebaumarkt DIY store opened in 1979, taking the cooperative into retail.

From 2007 to 2019 Hagebau cooperated with the Otto Group in the baumarkt direkt e-commerce joint venture. The partners ended the venture in 2019 and pursued separate online strategies.

In April 2017 the supervisory board approved the integration of the ZEUS DIY systems business into Hagebau with effect from 1 January 2018, consolidating retail activities under hagebau Einzelhandel.

== Operations ==
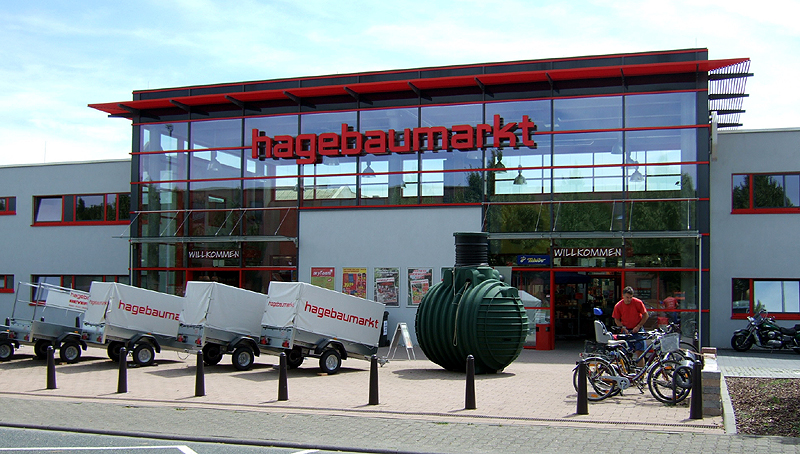
Hagebaumarkt near Mainz (2007)

The cooperative covers both wholesale and retail. Retail is run as a franchise system for the hagebaumarkt and hagebau kompakt formats, supported by group services in logistics, IT and e-commerce. Trade reporting put the number of shareholding merchants at about 356 in 2023.

Group sales were €7.67 billion in 2022 and €6.56 billion in 2023. The cooperative attributed the lower 2024 figure largely to a restructuring that ended intra-group resale, with its underlying goods business roughly stable at about €5.99 billion.

In 2019 Hagebau introduced hageworX, an in-store DIY workshop concept, first piloted in Hanover.
