= Vollbütteler Riede =

River in Germany

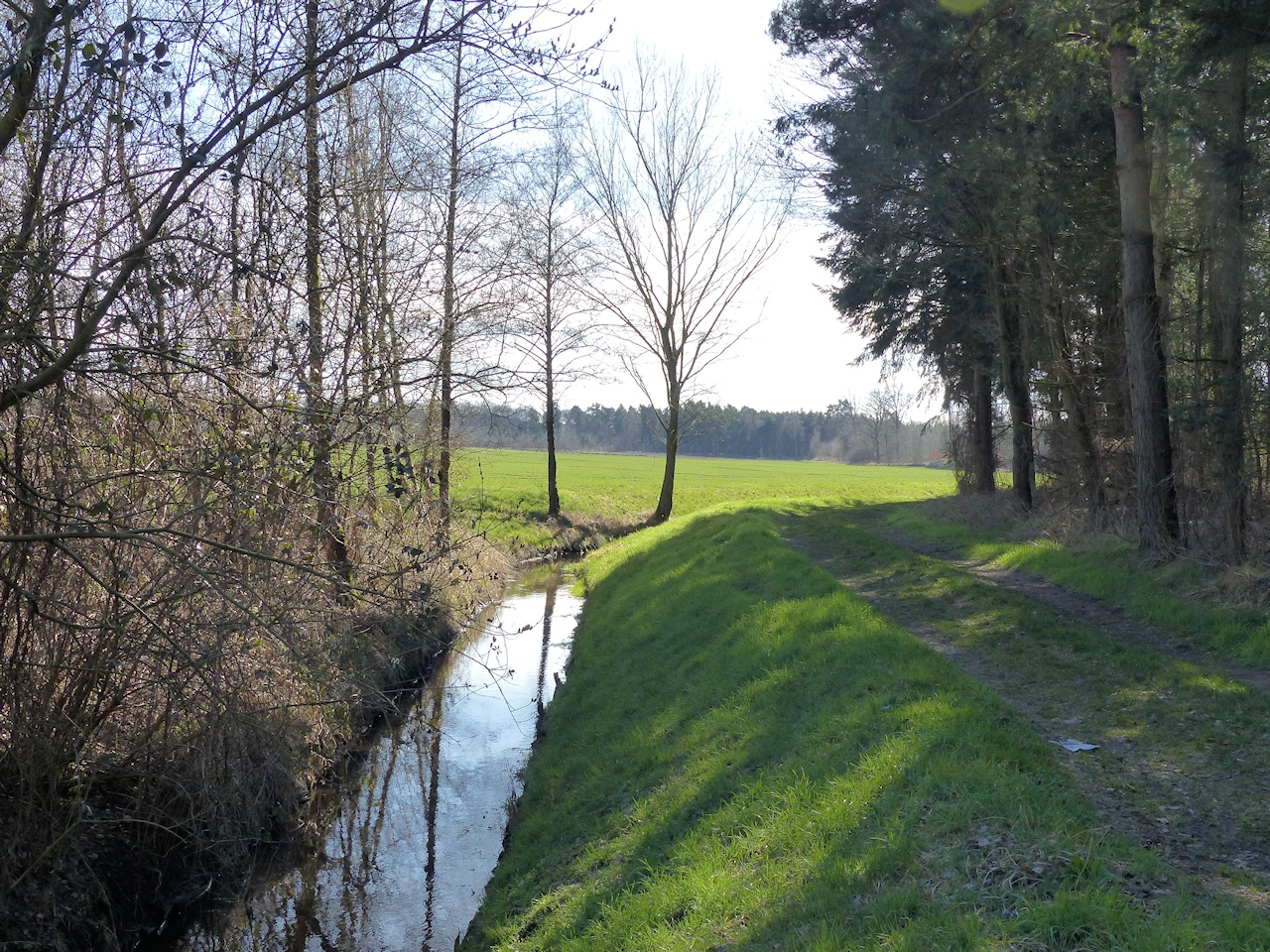

Location
- Country: Germany
- State: Lower Saxony

Physical characteristics
- Mouth
  - location: Alte Hehlenriede
  - coordinates: 52°27′19″N 10°30′37″E
- Length: 8.7 km (5.4 mi)

Basin features
- Progression: Alte Hehlenriede→ Aller Canal→ Aller→ Weser→ North Sea

The Vollbütteler Riede is a river of Lower Saxony, Germany. It flows into the Alte Hehlenriede near Gifhorn.

== See also ==
- List of rivers of Lower Saxony
