= Rötgesbütteler Riede =

River in Germany

Location
- Country: Germany
- States: Lower Saxony

Physical characteristics
- Mouth
  - location: Alte Hehlenriede
  - coordinates: 52.4575°N 10.5026°E

Basin features
- Progression: Alte Hehlenriede→ Aller Canal→ Aller→ Weser→ North Sea

The Rötgesbütteler Riede, also called Ausbütteler Riede, is a river of Lower Saxony, Germany. It flows into the Alte Hehlenriede near Gifhorn.

== See also ==
- List of rivers of Lower Saxony
