= Alte Hehlenriede =

River in Germany

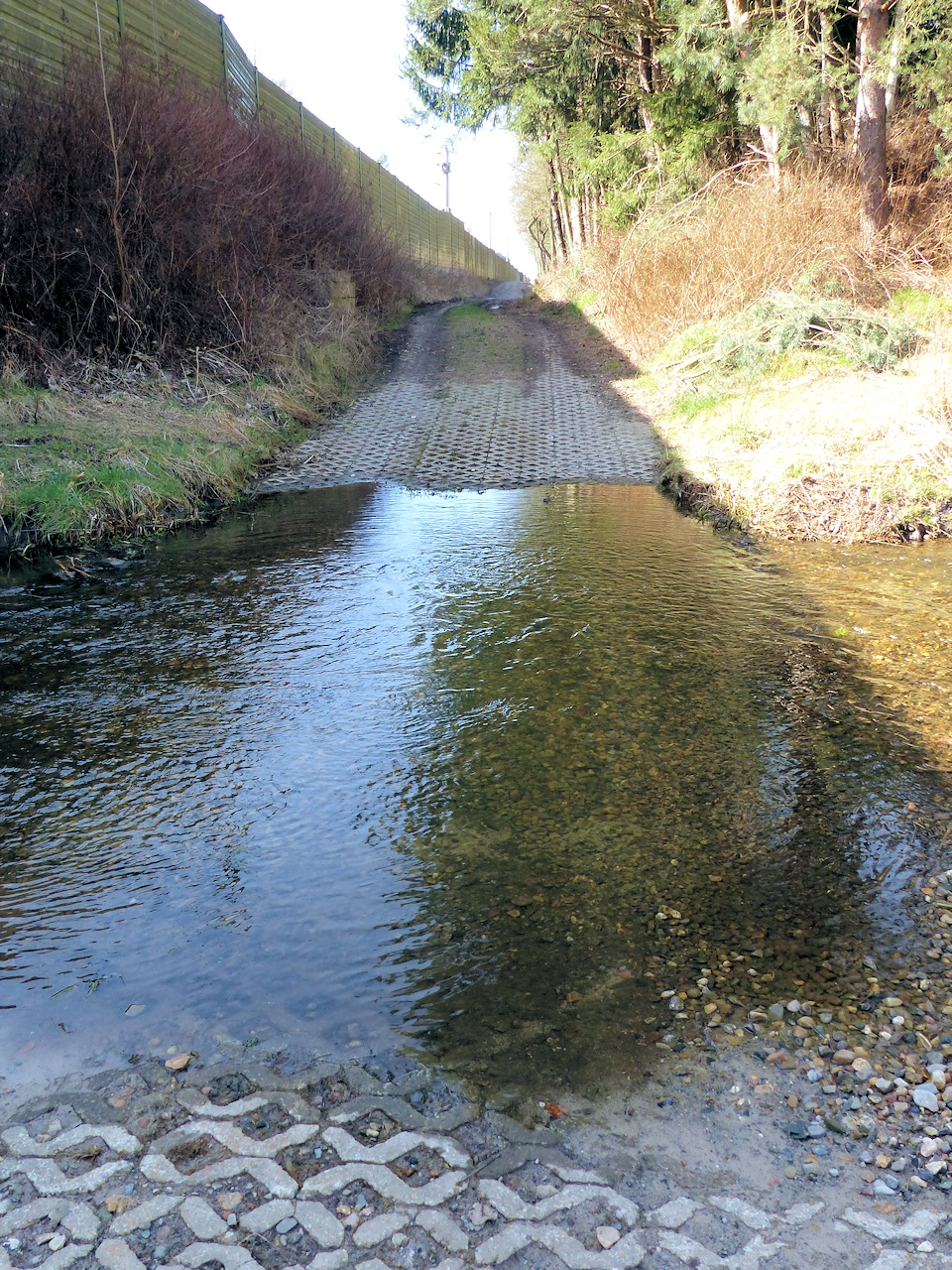
- Alte Hehlenriede ford shortly before the Aller Canal

- Location of mouth in Lower Saxony

Location
- Country: Germany
- State: Lower Saxony

Physical characteristics
- Source
  - location: South of Gifhorn
  - coordinates: 52.4503°N 10.5291°E
- Mouth
  - location: At Winkel (a district of Gifhorn) into the Aller Canal
  - coordinates: 52.4574°N 10.5027°E

Basin features
- Progression: Aller Canal→ Aller→ Weser→ North Sea

The Alte Hehlenriede is a river of Lower Saxony, Germany.

The source of the Alte Hehlenriede is the confluence of the Abdeckereigraben and the Ausbütteler Riede south of Gifhorn. It is a tributary of the Aller Canal at Winkel (a district of Gifhorn).

== See also ==
- List of rivers of Lower Saxony
