= Rethen =

Rethen is a former municipality in the district of Gifhorn, Lower Saxony. The village was probably founded during the Saxon Wars of Charlemagne. In the Middle Ages, Rethen was a border town between the Roman Catholic Diocese of Hildesheim and Diocese of Halberstadt. In 1974 Rethen and Eickhorst were incorporated into the municipality of Vordorf, which belongs to the Samtgemeinde Papenteich. Today the village has about 1200 inhabitants.

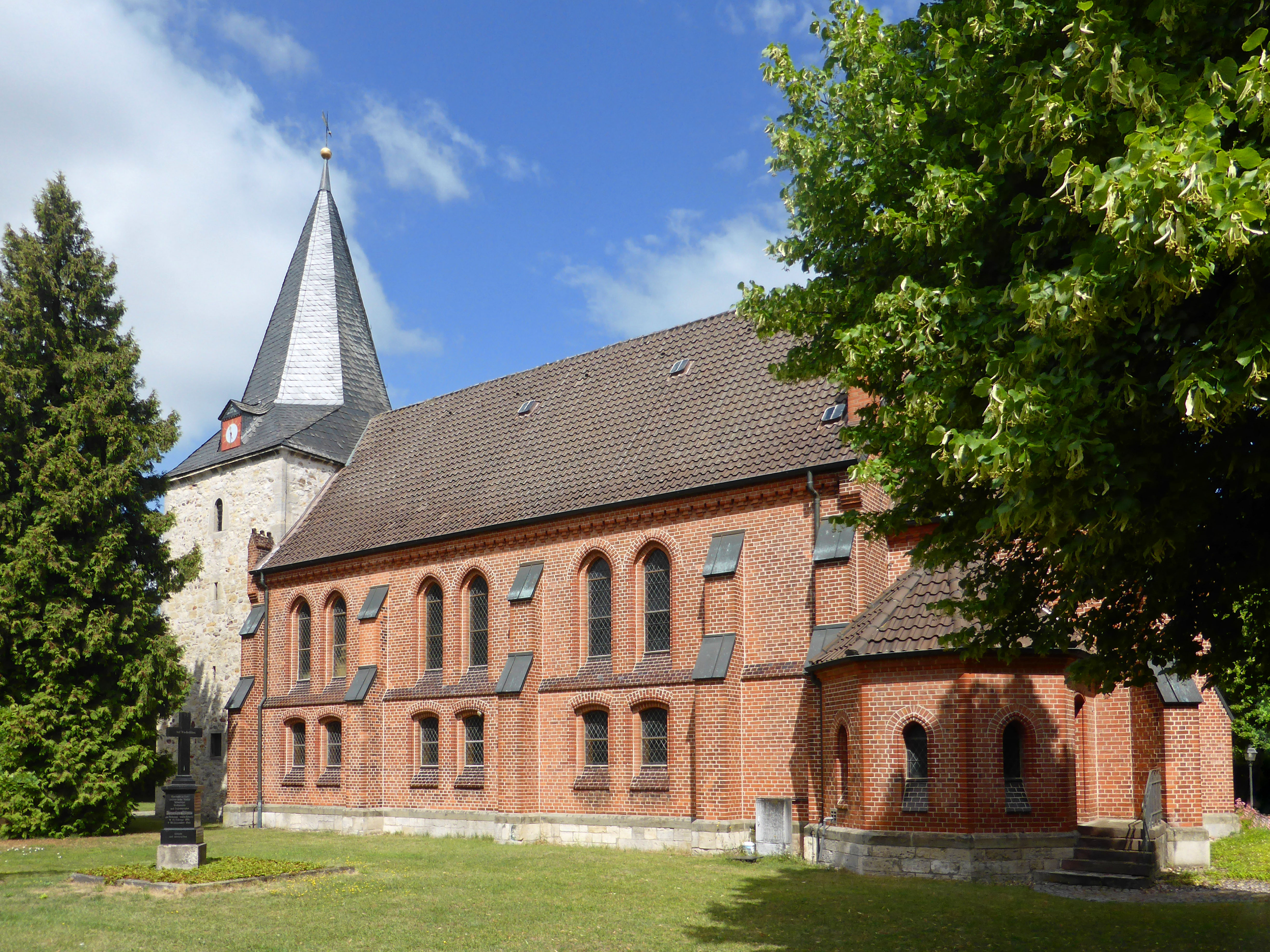
Rethen Church

== Geography ==
=== Geographical position ===
Rethen is located in middle Germany, in relatively short distance north of the city of Braunschweig and not far from the major cities of Salzgitter and Wolfsburg. The village lies south of the Lüneburg Heath and three kilometers northwest of Vordorf, the seat of the municipality. Rethen is located directly on the Lower Saxony L 321. Nearest major traffic routes are the B 4 (4 km to the east), the B 214 (6 km to the west) and the A2 (6 km to the south). Nearest middle centers are Gifhorn, Peine and Wolfenbüttel.

=== Geology ===
The village is centrally located on the sandy-loamy plateau of the Papenteich approximately 75–82 m above sea level. The landscape around Rethen is predominantly characterized by arable farming and individual wooded areas. The various soils of the district are of medium to good quality. Flat soils over calcareous marl are better rated, in the village also called "unser Klei". Sands and loams are glacial-post-glacial depositions. Isolated boulders near the surface, small boulders and flints are boulder deposits of the Elster- and Saale glaciation.

A special feature are the near-surface limestone marl layers of the so-called "Rethen-Meiner Upper Cretaceous basin" in the Rethen area as well as in Meine and Vordorf, formed in a shallow sea about 80 million years ago. The limestone marl contains fossils from this Cretaceous period, such as sponges, sea urchins, and mussels. Until the beginning of the 20th century, a commercially used lime pit south-east of Rethen was a rich finding place. Today the pit is no longer opened up, however, even today isolated finds are made in the course of soil excavations such as construction pits.

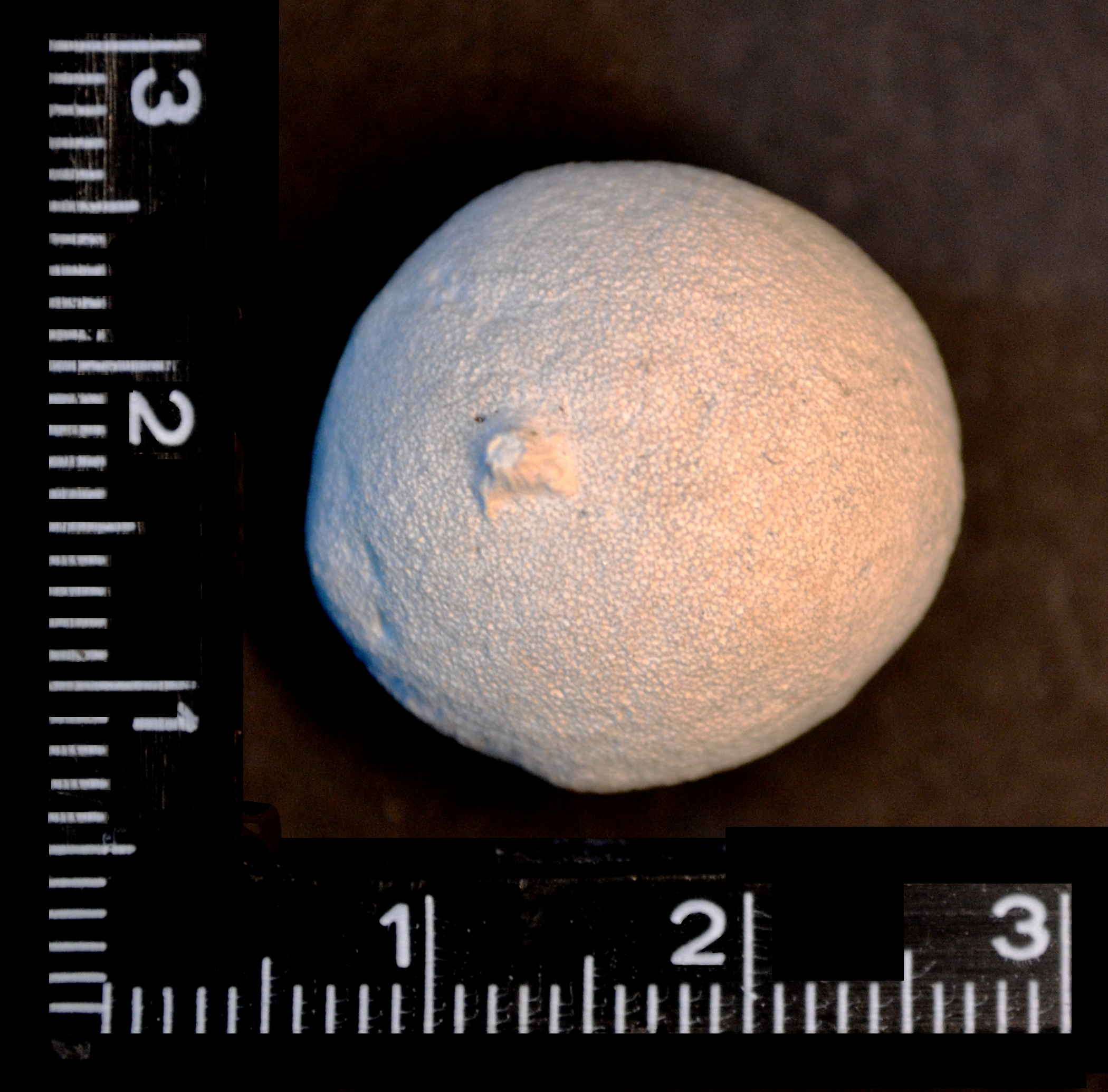
Fossile Porosphaera Globularis, found in Rethen

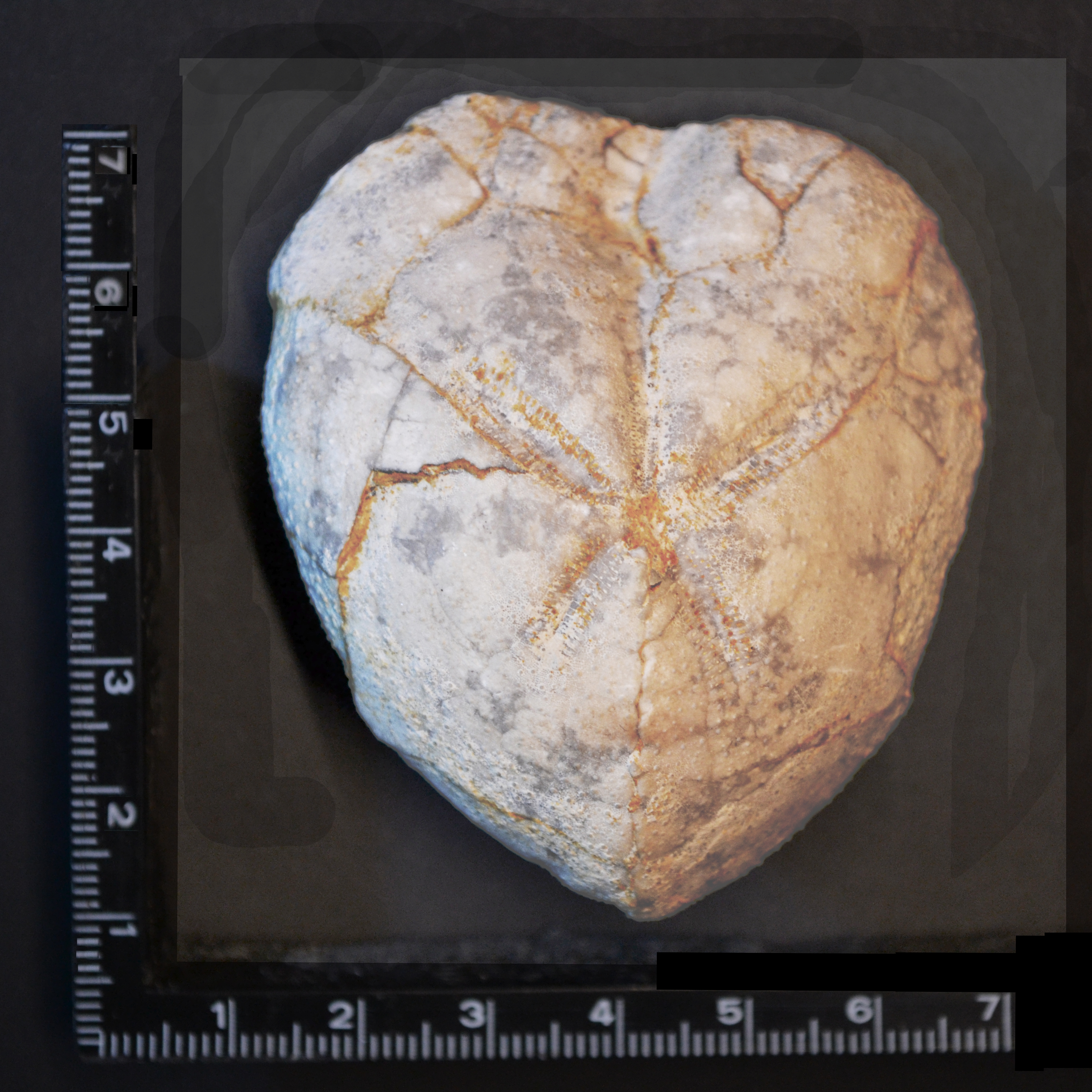
Fossile of a Sea urchin (Echinoida), found in Rethen

=== Waters ===
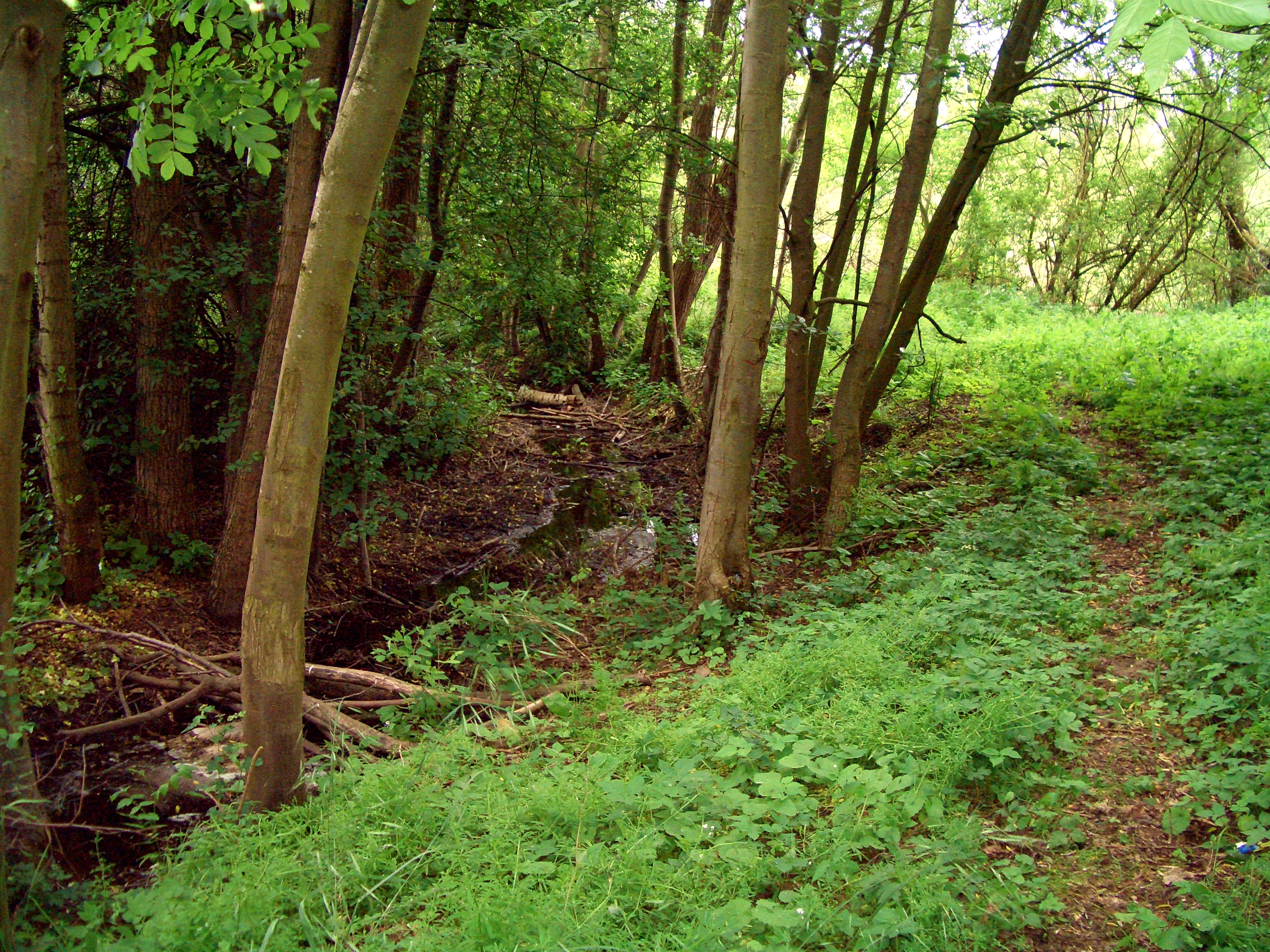
Die Vollbütteler Riede nördlich von Rethen

Rethen used to be known for its very productive water springs, which were used equally by Rethen residents and the inhabitants of neighboring villages. For decades, a spring near the village pond has been available to the public and is still regularly used by farmers today. In the Rethen district there are also two creeks with historical significance:

- Vollbütteler Riede (also: Mühlenriede, Mönchsgraben)

The Mühlenriede was a boundary marker between the Roman Catholic Diocese of Hildesheim and the Roman Catholic Diocese of Halberstadt around the year 1000. At that time, the stream bore the name Druchterbiki, which later gave rise to the name Druffel-Bach. According to old border maps, the creek rises north of Rethen and flows past the villages of Algesbüttel, Klein Vollbüttel, Druffelbeck and Ribbesbüttel into the creek Hehlenriede and finally into the Allerkanal.

- Rötgesbütteler Riede (also: Dingbanksriede)

The name of this small creek derives from the old dingbanks near Rötgesbüttel, before they were moved to the Schierenbalken in the 16th century. The historic dingbanks are located about 3.5 kilometers northeast of Rethen on Rötgesbüttel territory.

=== Natural Reserve Maaßel ===
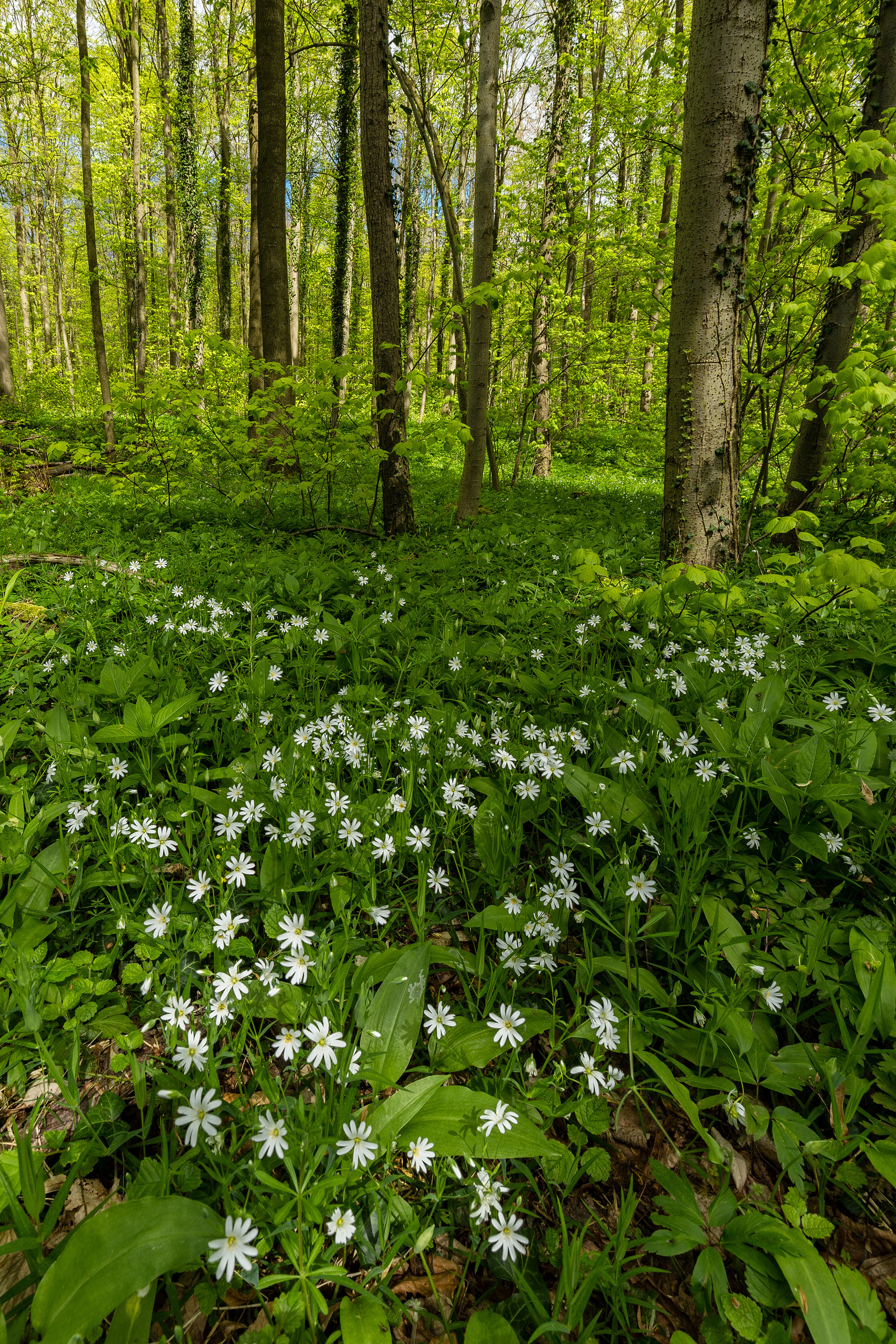
Naturschutzgebiet Maaßel

In the north of Rethen, the soils become increasingly wet and the predominantly agricultural area is increasingly interspersed with tree cover. This tree cover then turns into an Oak-hornbeam forest. The forest area extends between Rethen, Rötgesbüttel and Vollbüttel. The area belongs to the new Naturschutzgebiet (nature reserve) Maaßel since 2019.

== People ==
=== Demographic development ===
It is not possible to find any exact population figures for the time before the year 1821. The only reliable dates are sporadic documents, mentioning the number of different farms and buildings in Rethen. In 1489 a document listed 3 Hufner (full farmers), 4 smallholdings and 13 Kötner (small Prussian house owners). This didn't change much until the next notification in 1773 with 6 Hufner, 14 Kötner and 4 Brinksitzer (lowest level farmers). An enlargement of the village started after the end of the 18th century. As a result of these sparse notes, scientists believe that between 200 and 250 people were living in the village during the middle ages.

The next enlargement was triggered by refugees of World War II. Many of them removed later further to the west. This was mainly because of the nonexistent possibilities of housing space within the village. The latest enlargement started during suburbanization in the 1990s, activated by new preparations of land for building and the vicinity to several larger cities and highways. Model calculations shows a further growth of population figures during the next decades based on the facts named above.

Rethen Demographic development since 1821
Development	Year	Population	Year	Population	Year	Population	
	1821	328	1933	478	2000	1222	
	1848	365	1939	503	2005	1223	
	1890	386	1950	848	2006	1214	
	1900	420	1961	687	2013	1137	
	1905	470	1970	725	2015	1125	
	1912	514	1980	843	2021	1138	
	1925	499	1990	879			Quellen:

== History ==
=== Prehistory ===
The first signs of settlement within the boundaries of Rethen go back more than 5000 years. In 1995 megalithic tomb remains were found near the village. The settlement, belonging to the tomb, is assumed within 3 km.

=== Abandoned villages ===
There are several Abandoned villages in the immediate vicinity, including Dudanroth (1000 AD), Bromhorst (1007 AD) or Arnsbüttel. Most of these are located outside the present-day municipal boundaries. All settlements fell desolate between the 13th and 16th centuries. Explicitly documented are:

- Algesbüttel was mentioned first time in the year 1022. The place had around 7 farms and one church. The last documentary mentioning was in 1480 as a fiefdom of Lüneburg.
- Ossenrode (Asenroth) was mentioned first time in the year 1112. The place had around 4 farms and was situated in the north-east of Rethen. Archaeological records belongs to the 12th and 14th century.
- Zinsrode (Sinesrode) was situated between Rethen and Vordorf. The place is located but not ascertained. At the surface area several arranged stones can be seen. The last documentary mentioning was in the end of the 15th century.
- Wendenbüttel (Wendenbutle) was mentioned first time in the year 1007 and was situated in the south of Rethen. Archaeological records belongs to the 10th and 14th century.

=== Foundation ===
==== Documentary mentions ====
The first documentary mention of Rethen comes from 2 April 1301. At that time, the village was purely agricultural, with mainly cattle breeding and only a little arable farming. The content of the deed is the sale of five hooves and four meadows in "Rethene". The knight Balduin von Wenden and his squires Ludolf and Georg sold this property to the Monastery St. Crucis (Braunschweig).

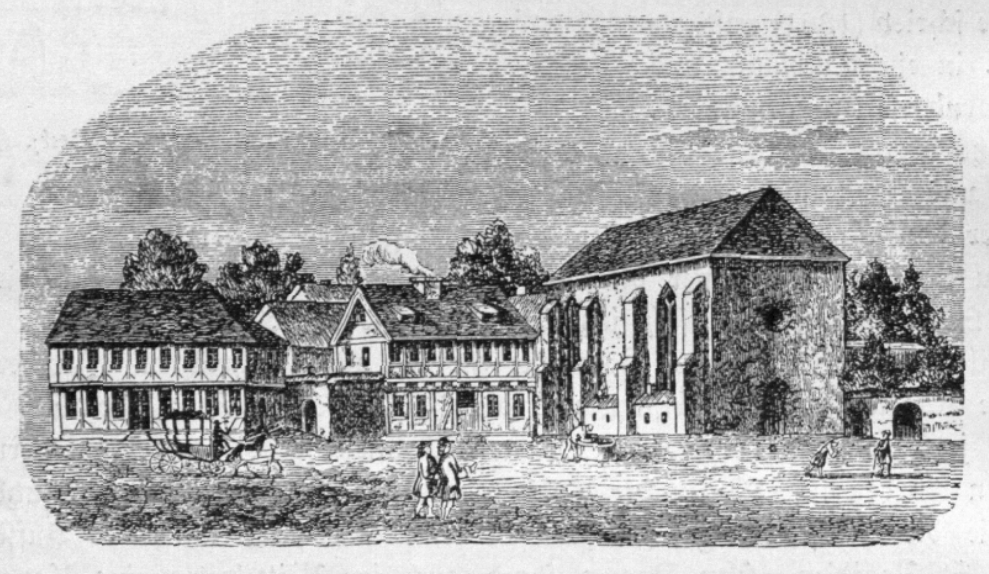
The Knights Templer Building in Braunschweig, Depiction from the 18th century

Some years later, a legal dispute between Duke Otto of Brunswick and Lord of Süpplingenburg and the St. Crucis Monastery over five hooves is documented. It is not known whether these are the same hooves as those of the knight Balduin. In any case, Otto and probably also the Knights Templars in Brunswick laid claim to these hooves. After the dissolution of the Knights Templar in 1312, Otto was informed in 1314 that he and the Knights Templar had no right to the property in Rethen.

==== Church ====
The church can also be dated back to the early days of the village. The first mentions are found in the years 1323 and 1341; they concern the parish household and the election of churchwardens. The church tower that still exists today may have existed at that time (estimates put it in the 13th century). The Gothic-style tympanum above the portal is more likely to date to the 15th century, based on similar depictions in neighbouring parishes.

==== Indirect mentions ====
Rethen is thus in any case older than the documented mentions indicate. An older age was already indicated in 1641. Georg von Rethen, mayor of Braunschweig, wrote about his family history that his ancestor Heinrich Bethmann had already been granted estates in Rethen and the church patronage by Bishop Hartbert of Hildesheim in 1199. However, no documentary evidence of this is known.

==== Toponymy ====
In the latest scientific published papers (1994), Rethen is considered as a frankish founding, related to the founding of Meine. It is believed, that the Franks founded several settlements while they subdued the Saxons in the 8th century. In that century, an important road crossed the, in that time existing, Northforest in east–west direction, supposable in the vicinity of Rethen and Meine. A number of examples were already explored, where several Frankish settlements where assigned to one central village. However, this relation continued just short time. Already in the 11th century, the border between the Bishopric of Halberstadt and the Bishopric of Hildesheim divided both villages. Several tryouts of the different Bishops of Hildesheim to take over the Rethen area failed. The border existed for around 500 years, up to the Protestant Reformation.

=== Nobility ===
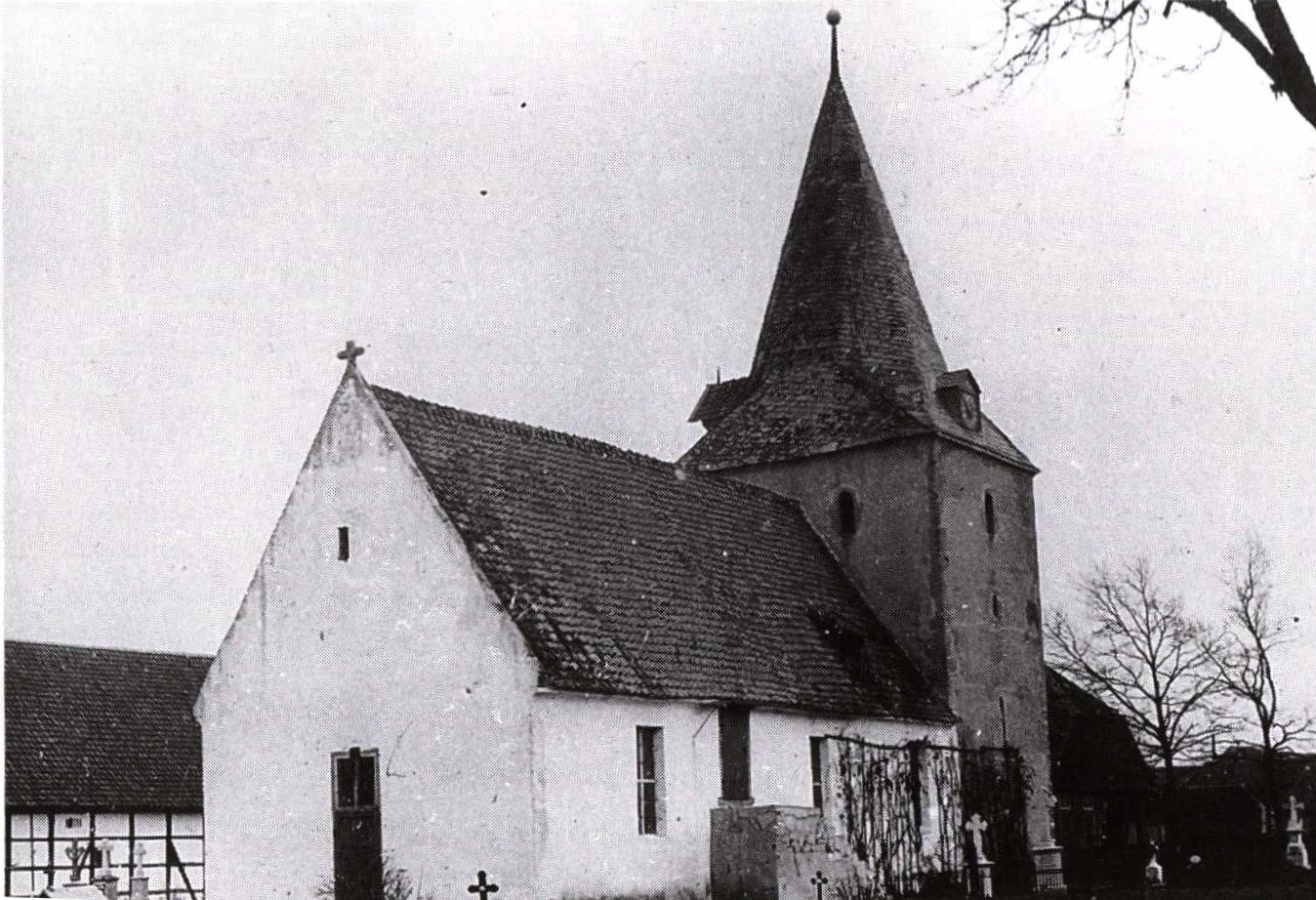
The old church of Rethen before its demolition in 1901

According to the family chronics, written in 1641, already around 1211 "Heinrich Bethman from Chur in the land of Rhetia" received the feudality about court, jus patronatus about church and the right of hunting. The documentary mentioning of these rights was firstly found in a document from the year 1383/85. Based on his long-standing experience in the war service Bethmann suppositiously built his house in some kind of a water castle on a small island in the village pond. During the following decades the village was attacked several times by different local robber barons. In the years 1308, 1380, 1381 and 1388 they destroyed Rethen nearly completely. At one of these raids (presumably on 13 July 1381) the water castle was also destroyed.

Consequently, the masters of Rethen left the village after about 150 years of presence and relocated in Braunschweig. Also the left Rethen, they kept the patronage right about Rethen. The family became extinct presumably in the 18th century. After the connection of the parishes of Adenbüttel and Rethen in the first half of the 16th century, the master von Rethen and the Freiherr von Marenholz (patronage right in Adenbüttel) concerted the patronage right in the combined church municipality. Nevertheless, in the course of the time the right went over more and more to the family of Marenholz. This exercised it up to the death of the last patron (baron of Marenholz-Nolte) in 1969.

=== Early modern period till modernity ===
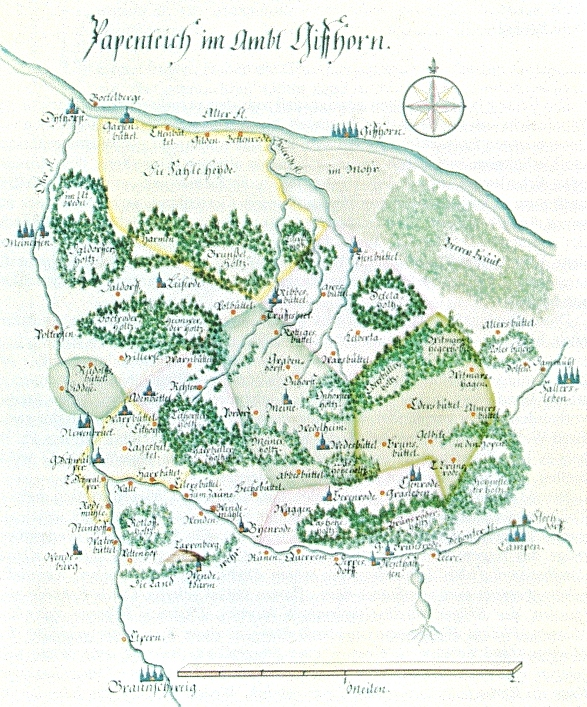
Map from 1600, showing the villages in the region Papenteich

In the year 1625, during the Danish intervention in the Thirty Years' War, troops of Emperors Ferdinand II troops made their winter camp near Rethen. Houses and Church were looted and the citizens had to work at sconces construction near Wolfenbüttel. Also in the 1640s lootings are reported more than once, mostly by Swedish soldiers.

The village was spared by the Seven Years' War as well as during the French Revolutionary Wars and was charged only by taxes and war loans. Only worth mentioning is the murdering of a shepherd by French Dragoons in 1758. During the Austro-Prussian War in 1866 as well as during the Franco-Prussian War in 1870/71 people from Rethen were drawn and returned home without worse injuries.

Living in the village was mainly affected by the changes in agriculture during the 19th century. These concerned several reorganisations of the local surface as well as the intensification of husbandry linked with strong deforestation. In the second half of the 19th century an intensive cultivation of sugar beets starts, strongly favoured by the construction of the sugar beet factory in Meine.

=== World War I ===
In common with many Europeans, the people of Rethen expressed a great enthusiasm for World War I at the start of the conflict in 1914. In all, 78 citizens were drawn into the German Empire's army; 14 of them died during the war. In the winter of 1914/15, refugees from Russian-occupied territories were quartered in Rethen. French prisoners of war were brought to Rethen to help in road construction and agricultural work. By the end of war, especially during the "Steckrübenwinter" (Rutabaga winter) in 1916/17, ordinary life became difficult for the people of Rethen as it did for their fellow countrymen throughout Germany. In spite of food rationing, high unemployment, and a generally poor economy, no revolution took place. In the last days of the war, a workers' and soldiers' council arose, but after a short time it collapsed and was followed by a parish council.

=== World War II ===
During World War II no big war enthusiasm took place in Rethen. The agricultural work had to be done by women and old people. They were partly supported by foreign workers and Prisoners of war, mainly from France, Poland and Russia. The treatment of the different ethics was quit unequal. While the Russians remained in prisoner-of-war camps, the Polish and French were accommodated with the villagers. However, even this accommodation was mostly rather inadequate cause the villagers feared denunciation and announcement by other inhabitants loyal to government in case of a friendly treatment of the prisoners.

The heaviest bomb attack Rethen experienced on 23 August 1944 at 11:30 o'clock. Four gravity bombs came down close by the village. Besides, a larger amount of incendiary bombs were thrown down directly above the village and caused several conflagrations. The community building, two stables, three wheat stocks and four residential buildings were burned down completely. Fires in other buildings could be extinguished by the inhabitants themselves. Fire brigades from the whole Papenteich and Braunschweig appeared. In spite of the massive attack, no people were injured.

On 10 April 1945, American soldiers, coming from Peine, occupied Rethen peacefully. The military order to the Volkssturm to defend the village was refused, and the weapons were sunk in the village pond. Most American soldiers stayed just a few days, and only a small part remained for one quarter.

== Culture and sightseeing ==
=== Language ===
Linguistically Rethen belongs to the German language area around Hannover. However, a part of the population still use German combined with phrases from the old Brunswick and the Papenteich Low Saxon. In former times the everyday speech of Rethen was an Eastphalian Papenteich dialect, whereas the speech in school and church was Standard German.

With the changes of the 20th century, the Low Saxon dialect disappeared more and more. After World War II it was displaced completely by standard German.

=== Religion ===
Denomination	People	Percentage
Protestantism/Lutheranism	740	61%
Roman Catholicism	114	9%
Atheism and others	rest	30%

Since the Protestant Reformation the people in Rethen were part of the Lutheranism church and highly affected by the ecclesiastical life.

The first changes were noted in the early 19th century. Until then 350 people visited the worship in average. This number reduced during the next decades (1938: 100 people) to the present-day level of 70 (1990s). Likewise the percentage of Protestant interest in the whole population decreased from 91% to 61%.

=== Voluntary associations ===
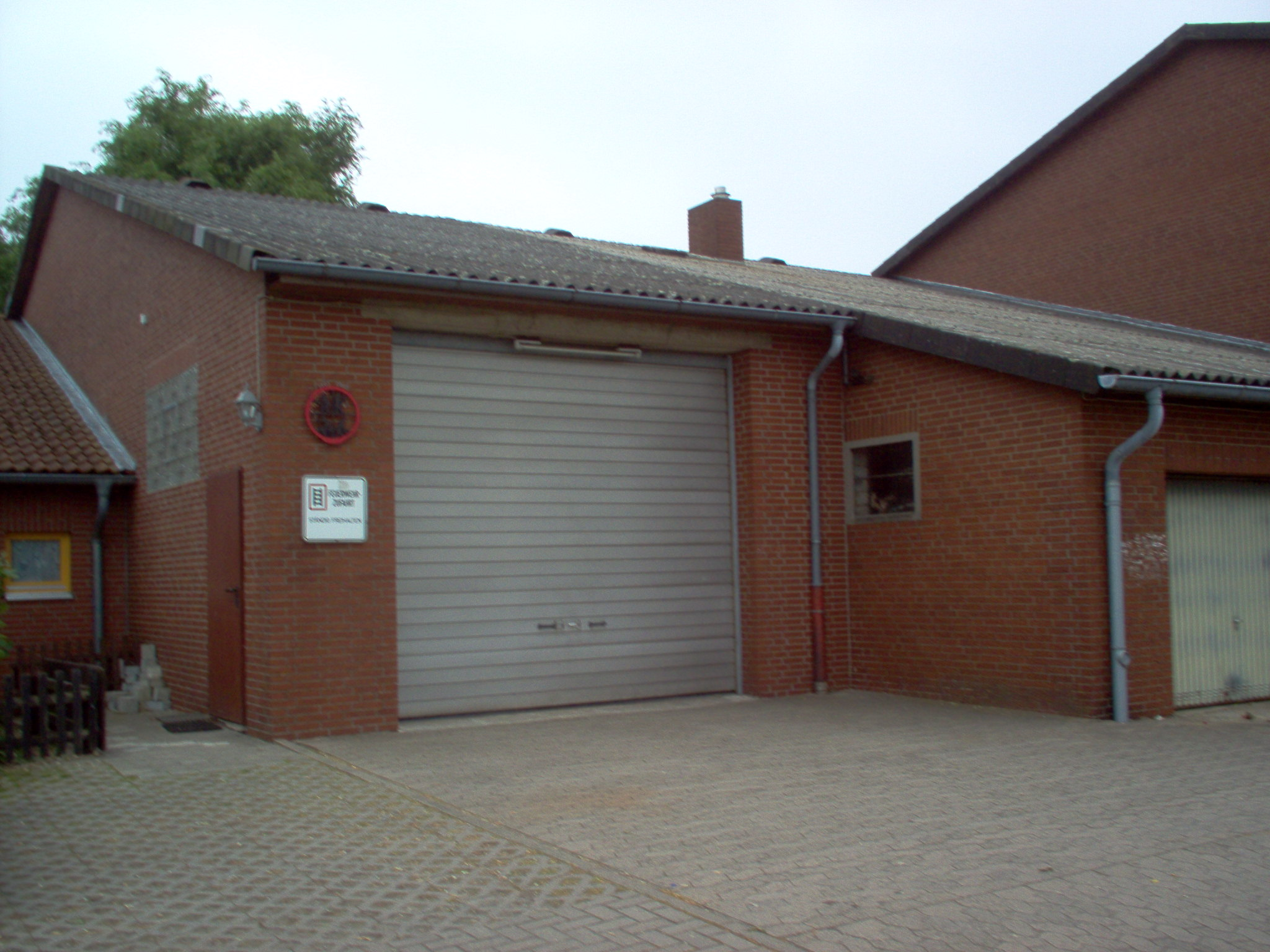
Fire Brigade Rethen

The following voluntary associations and institutions are situated in Rethen:

- Skittle Clubs: founded 1928 ("Morgenstern" – Morning star) and 1954 ("Gemütlichkeit") the members of both Skittle Clubs: meeting regularly every week.
- TSV Rethen: founded 1947 the club had about 637 member in the year 2000. The club offers volleyball, tennis, gymnastics, dance and tai chi. The football department had been outsourced in 2006.
- FSV Adenbüttel Rethen: founded on the 29 April 2006 as a merger of the football departments of TSV Rethen and MTV Adenbüttel.
- Schützenverein: founded 1962 the Schützenverein had about 637 members in the year 2000. The club owns an air gun – shooting range and organises the yearly Schützenfest
- Youth Club Rethen: founded 1973 is the youth club Rethen the oldest self-governing youth club in Northern Germany. In 1998 the club had more than 90 members.
- Choir "Polyhymnia": founded 1895

=== Sightseeing ===
==== Megalithic tomb ====
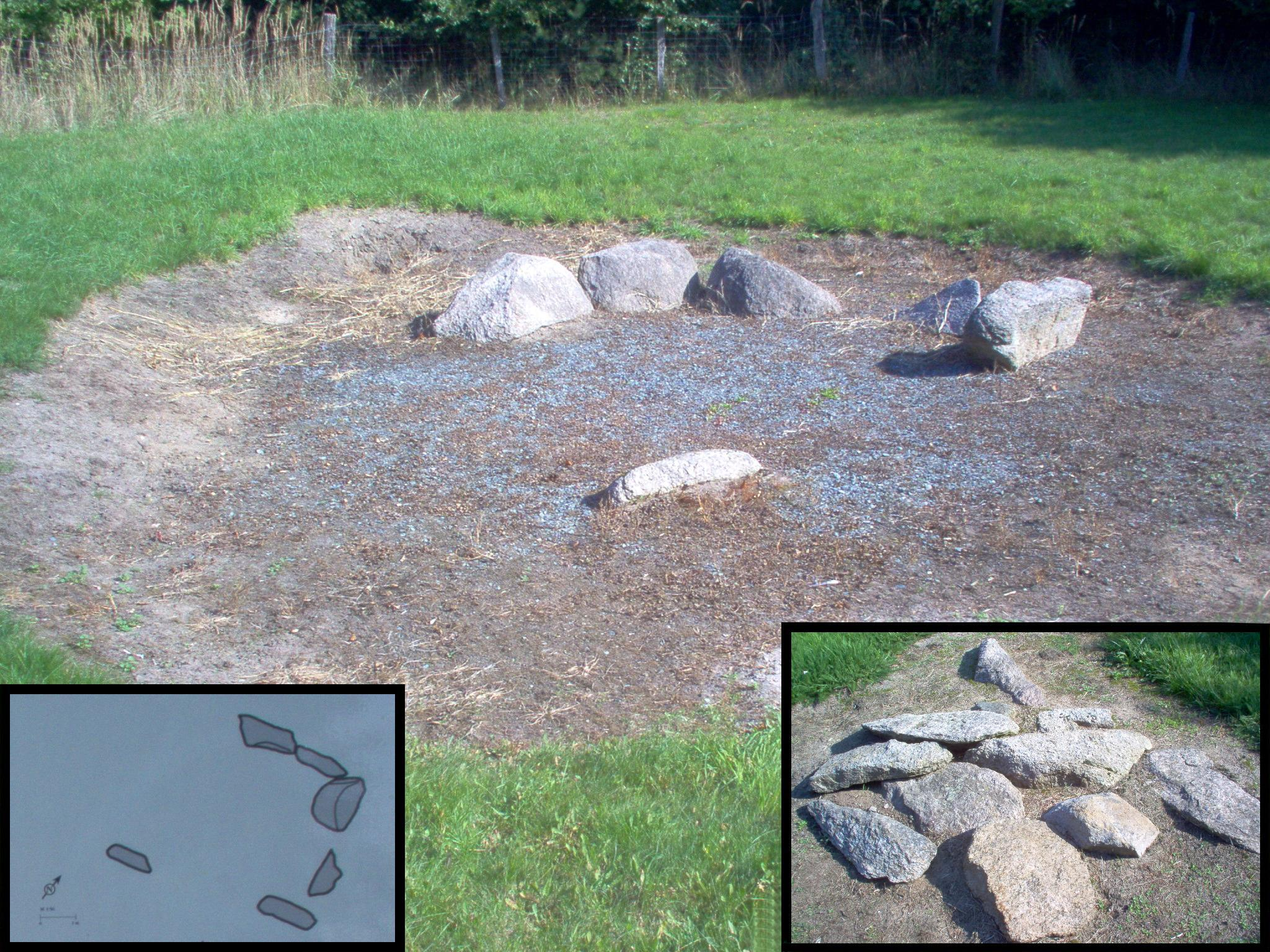
The megalithic grave of Rethen

In 1995, during farming activities, a Megalithic tomb (Dolmen) was found within the Rethen district (near the Maaßel forest). Six (rather small) stones form an arrangement, straightened in east–west direction. Based on investigations of the local archaeological department, the tomb is dated on 3,000 B.C. It is assumed, that the arrangement was a collective grave, build as a kind of cottage. The Neolithic settlement belonging to the grave is supposed in a vicinity of about 3 km.

The grave is probably a disturbed arrangement, which was covered earlier with wood or stones. Some bigger stones as well as the cover were probably removed in former times and used, e.g., for the building of a house. The arrangement was made accessible and handed over to the public in 1996. The Rethen Dolmen was the first known megalithic tomb in the district of Gifhorn.

== Economy and infrastructure ==
=== Infrastructure ===
- Road network: The nowadays road network was constructed in the second half of the 19th century. The streets names was established in 1976. Previously the houses were just numbered.
- Freah water/sewage: Although Rethen ever has more than enough clear groundwater, the village was attached to the public water supply network in 1963. In 1977 Rethen was connected to the sewage system as well.
- Energie: The electric power supply was installed in 1916.
- natural gas The grid gas supply was installed in 1996

=== Public facilities ===
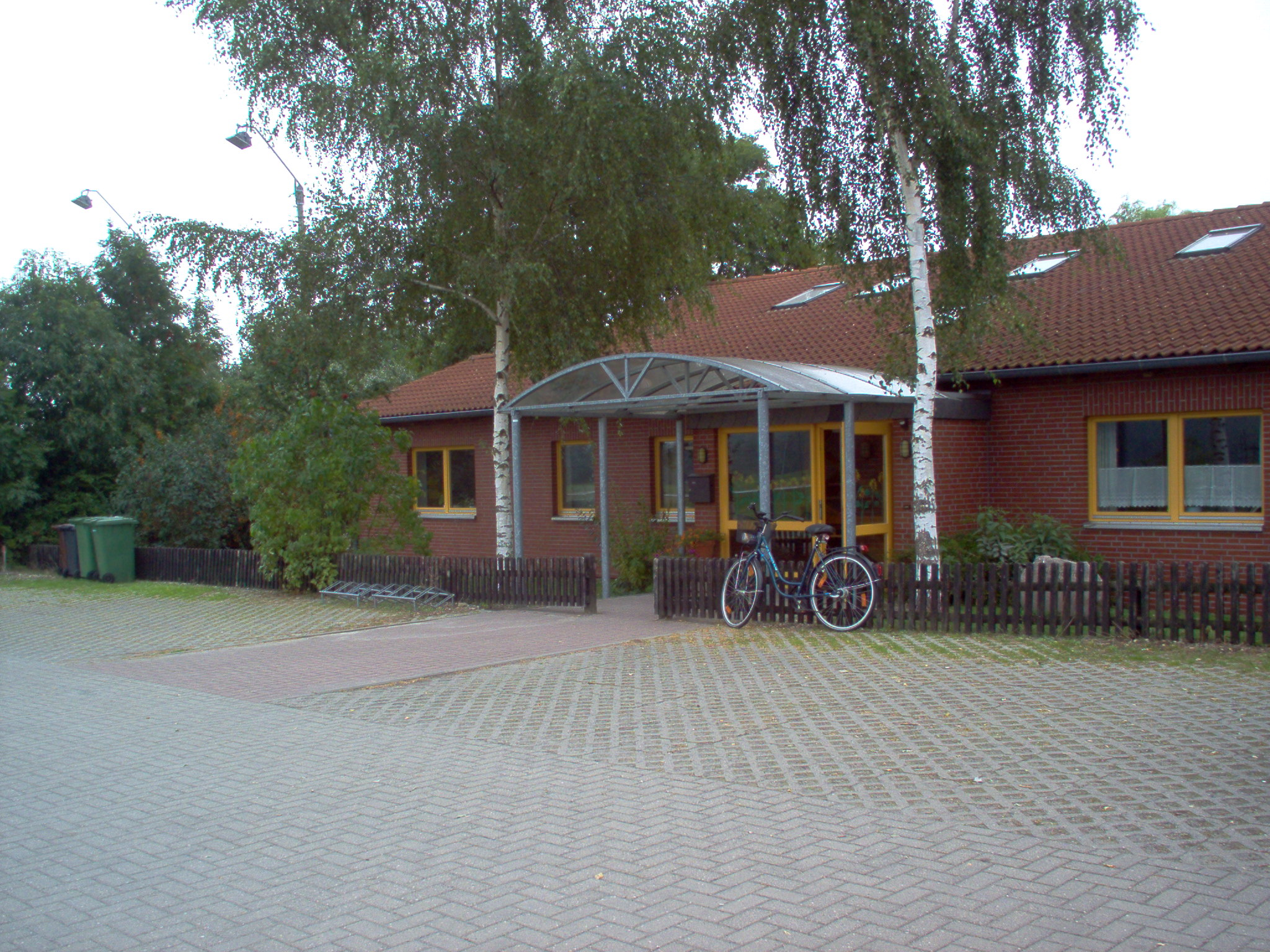
Kindergarten Rethen

Kindergarten: In the year 1992 a kindergarten was established opposite to the sports field. During the preceding centuries children from Rethen visited the kindergartens in the surrounding villages and cities. The operator of the kindergarten is the "Kindergarten Vordorf e. V." The kindergarten offers places for up to 50 children in two age-mixed groups.

== Politics ==
In its early times Rethen belonged to area of the Welf dynasty, but changed a lot between the House of Brunswick and the House of Lüneburg. With the construction of the Gifhorn District in 1549, Rethen belongs to the Gografschaft Rötgesbüttel. Up to 1972 Gifhorn belonged to the region of Lüneburg (formally principality Lüneburg). After the district reform of 1972, Gifhorn was affiliated to the region of Braunschweig. In the short era of the Kingdom of Westphalia it belongs to the Canton Rötgesbüttel and with that to the Département Oker.

In 1970 Rethen and 14 other municipalities formed the Samtgemeinde Papenteich with the administrative centre in Meine. In this time Rethen was still an independent municipality. The union with Vordorf and Eickhorst followed under the new name "Gemeinde Vordorf" (Municipality Vordorf) with the election of the first municipality council on June 28, 1974.
