= Adenbüttel =

- Municipality
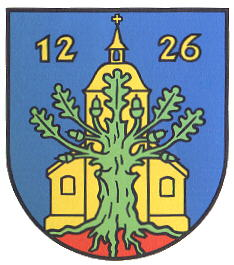
- Coat of arms

- Location of Adenbüttel within Gifhorn district
- Interactive map of Adenbüttel
- Location within Germany Location within Lower Saxony
- Coordinates: 52°22′51″N 10°27′09″E
- Country: Germany
- State: Lower Saxony
- District: Gifhorn
- Municipal assoc.: Papenteich
- Subdivisions: 2 Ortsteile

Government
  - Mayor: Michael Heinrichs (SPD)

Area
  - Total: 13.71 km^{2} (5.29 sq mi)
- Elevation: 74 m (243 ft)

Population (2025-12-31)
  - Total: 1,787
  - Density: 130.3/km^{2} (337.6/sq mi)
- Time zone: UTC+01:00 (CET)
  - Summer (DST): UTC+02:00 (CEST)
- Postal codes: 38528
- Dialling codes: 05304
- Vehicle registration: GF
- Website: www.adenbuettel.de

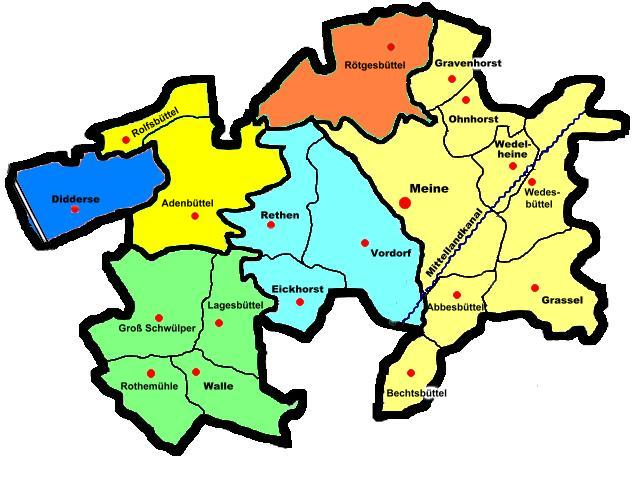
Map of the Papenteich

Adenbüttel is a municipality in the Gifhorn district in Lower Saxony, Germany. It is a member municipality of the Samtgemeinde Papenteich. The Municipality Adenbüttel includes the villages of Adenbüttel and Rolfsbüttel

== Geography ==
=== Neighbourhood ===
* distance from downtown

	City of Gifhorn (16 km)
Municipality Didderse (3 km)		Municipality Rötgesbüttel (8 km)
		Municipality Meine (4 km)	City of Wolfsburg (24 km)
Municipality Schwülper (3 km)		Rethen (2 km)
	City of Braunschweig (16 km)

=== Geographical position ===
Adenbüttel is situated north of Braunschweig, between the Harz and the Lüneburg Heath. However, administrative it belongs to the district of Gifhorn. Adenbüttel is around 4 km to the west to the German highway 4 (near Meine) and around 7 km to the north of the interchange Brunswick North (A2 /A391). Other bigger towns nearby are: Wolfsburg, Salzgitter, Wolfenbüttel, Gifhorn, Peine and Celle.

== History ==
The first documentary mentioning of Adenbüttel was in the year 1226. In 1619 a church was erected, whose baseplate can yet be seen nowadays. In the first half of 20th century a potash mine existed near the village.

== Politics ==
The last election for the community government took place on the 10 September 2006 with an election turnout of 73.39%. Since that day the district council consists as follows:

- CDU 5 Seats
- SPD 4 Seats
- Independent Party 2 Seats
