= Didderse =

- Municipality
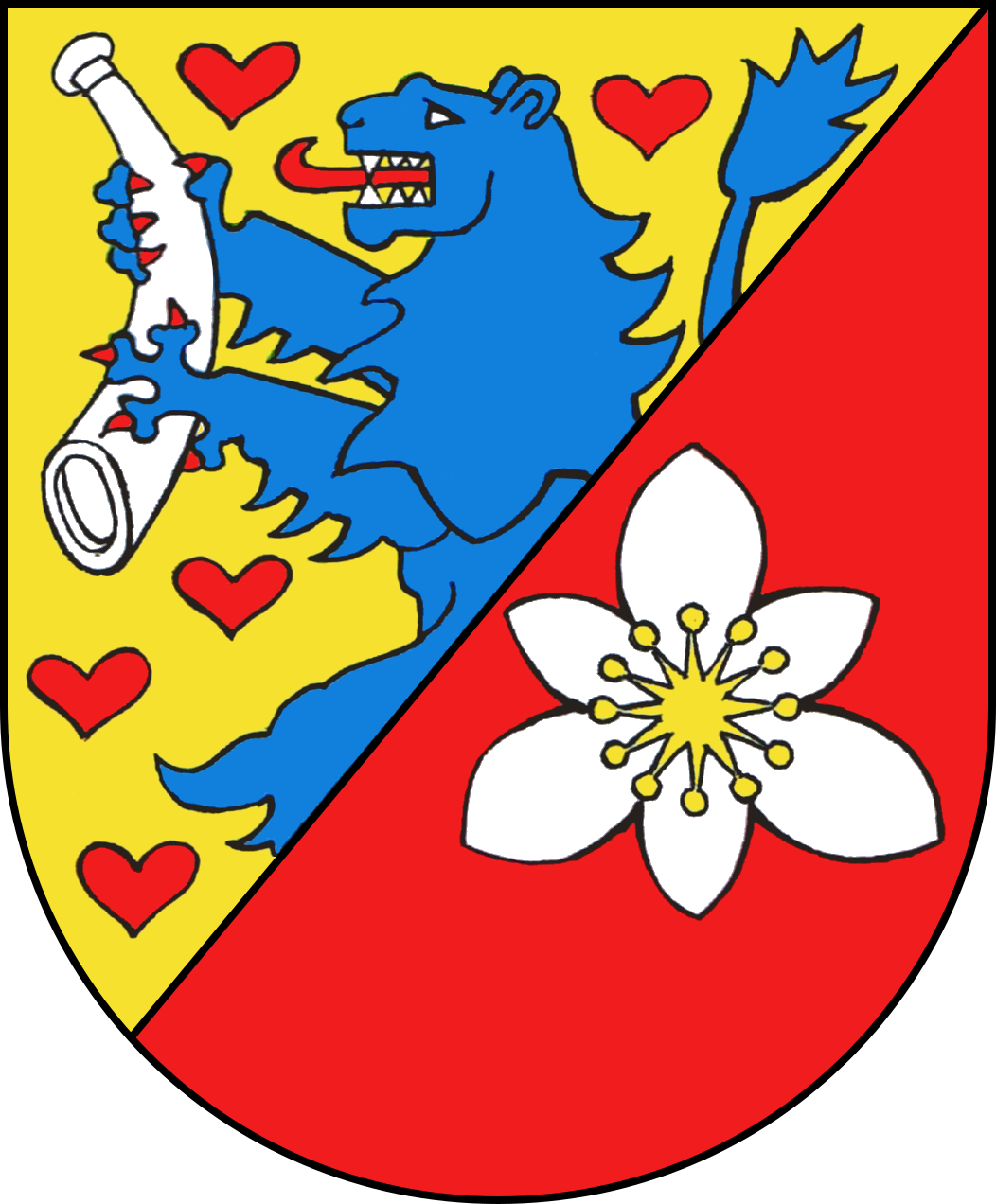
- Coat of arms

- Location of Didderse within Gifhorn district
- Interactive map of Didderse
- Location within Germany Location within Lower Saxony
- Coordinates: 52°22′51″N 10°24′9″E
- Country: Germany
- State: Lower Saxony
- District: Gifhorn
- Municipal assoc.: Papenteich

Government
  - Mayor: Randolf Moos (SPD)

Area
  - Total: 7.41 km^{2} (2.86 sq mi)
- Elevation: 60 m (200 ft)

Population (2025-12-31)
  - Total: 1,287
  - Density: 174/km^{2} (450/sq mi)
- Time zone: UTC+01:00 (CET)
  - Summer (DST): UTC+02:00 (CEST)
- Postal codes: 38530
- Dialling codes: 05373
- Vehicle registration: GF
- Website: www.papenteich.de

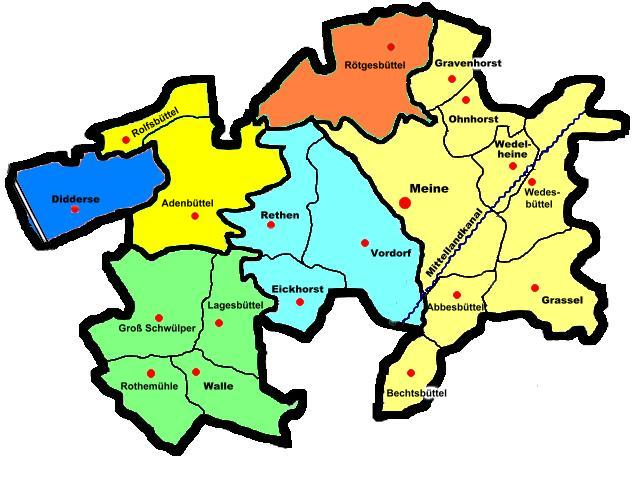
Map of the Papenteich

Didderse is a municipality in the district of Gifhorn, in Lower Saxony, Germany. It is a member municipality of the Samtgemeinde Papenteich.

== Geography ==
=== Neighbourhood ===
* distance from downtown

	City of Celle (37 km)	City of Gifhorn (22 km)
Wipshausen, District Peine (3 km)	Municipality Hillerse (5 km)	Village Rolfsbüttel (4 km)
		Municipality Adenbüttel (3 km)	City of Wolfsburg (24 km)
Ersehof, District Peine (1 km)	Neubrück, District Peine (0 km)
City of Peine (12 km)		City of Braunschweig (16 km)

=== Geographical position ===
Diddersel is situated north of Braunschweig, between the Harz and the Lüneburg Heath, directly on the Oker banks. However, administrative it belongs to the district of Gifhorn. Didderse is around 500m to the east to the German highway 214 and around 6 km to the north of Bundesautobahn 2. Other bigger towns nearby are: Wolfsburg, Salzgitter, Wolfenbüttel, Gifhorn, Peine and Celle.

== History ==
The first documentary mentioning of Didderse was in the year 780. In former times the village was known as Tiddenhusen. After the community reform from 1974 Didderse belonged to the district of Peine. This connection insisted just for a few years. In 1981 Didderse was reintegrated into the district of Gifhorn.

== Culture ==
=== Religion ===
Didderse is by the majority Protestantism. It forms a Parish together with the villages Hillerse, Rolfsbüttel and Neubrück.

== Politics ==
The last election for the community government took place on 10 September 2006 with an election turnout of 62.16%. Since that day the district council consists as follows:

- CDU 4 mandates (-1)
- SPD 7 mandates (-)
