= Rötgesbüttel =

- Municipality
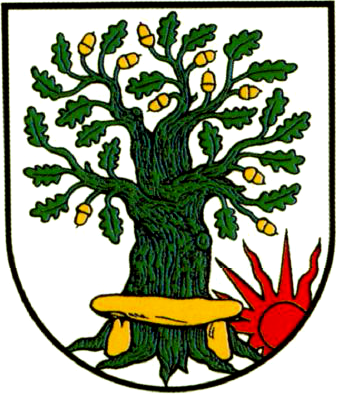
- Coat of arms

- Location of Rötgesbüttel within Gifhorn district
- Interactive map of Rötgesbüttel
- Location within Germany Location within Lower Saxony
- Coordinates: 52°25′N 10°32′E
- Country: Germany
- State: Lower Saxony
- District: Gifhorn
- Municipal assoc.: Papenteich

Government
  - Mayor: André Lohmann (CDU)

Area
  - Total: 10.83 km^{2} (4.18 sq mi)
- Elevation: 67 m (220 ft)

Population (2025-12-31)
  - Total: 2,520
  - Density: 233/km^{2} (603/sq mi)
- Time zone: UTC+01:00 (CET)
  - Summer (DST): UTC+02:00 (CEST)
- Postal codes: 38531
- Dialling codes: 05304
- Vehicle registration: GF

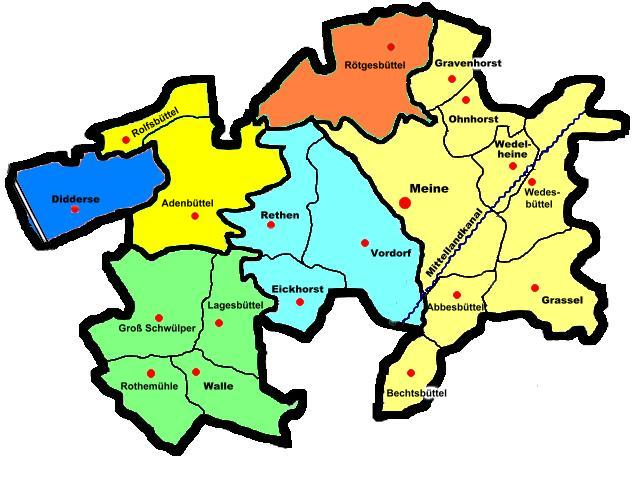
Map of the Papenteich

Rötgesbüttel is a municipality in the district of Gifhorn, in Lower Saxony, Germany. It is a member municipality of the Samtgemeinde Papenteich

== Geography ==
=== Neighbourhood ===
* distance from downtown

	City of Gifhorn (8 km)
Municipality Ribbesbüttel (3 km)		Municipality Isenbüttel (6 km)
Village Vollbüttel (3 km)		Village Ohnhorst (3 km)	City of Wolfsburg (18 km)
Municipality Adenbüttel (10 km)	Municipality Meine (5 km)
City of Peine (33 km)		City of Braunschweig (22 km)

=== Geographical position ===
Rötgesbüttel is situated north of Braunschweig, between the Harz and the Lüneburg Heath. It is situated at the German federal road B4 and around 13 km to the north of the interchange Brunswick North (A2 /A391). Administrative it belongs to the district of Gifhorn. Other bigger towns nearby are: Wolfsburg, Salzgitter, Wolfenbüttel, Gifhorn, Peine and Celle.

== History ==
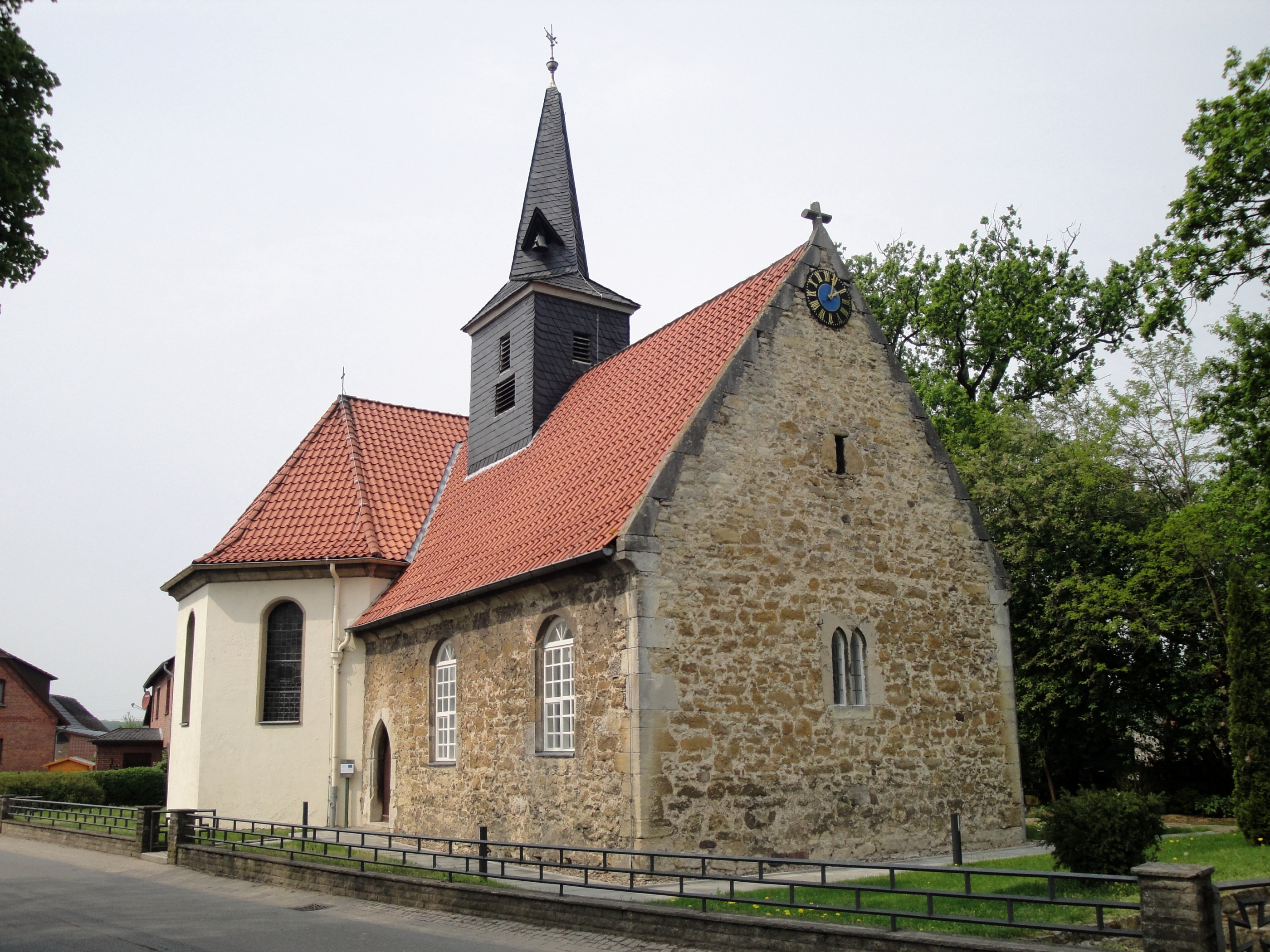
Lutheran church in Rötgesbüttel

The first documentary mentioning of Rötgesbüttel was in the year 1226. In former times the village was known as Rotlekesbutle . As most of the so-called “-büttel” villages it is expected that Rötgesbüttel may erected earliest in 10th century. In the Middle Ages the crossing traffic of a trade road from Braunschweig to Hamburg influenced the villages development.

== Politics ==
=== Municipal Council ===
The council of the Municipality Rötgesbüttel consists of 12 councilmen and woman:

- Christian Democratic Union 6 mandates
- Social Democratic Party 5 mandates
- Others 2 mandate

(Status: community election 10. September 2006 with a voter participation of 59,80%)
