= Papenteich =

- Samtgemeinde
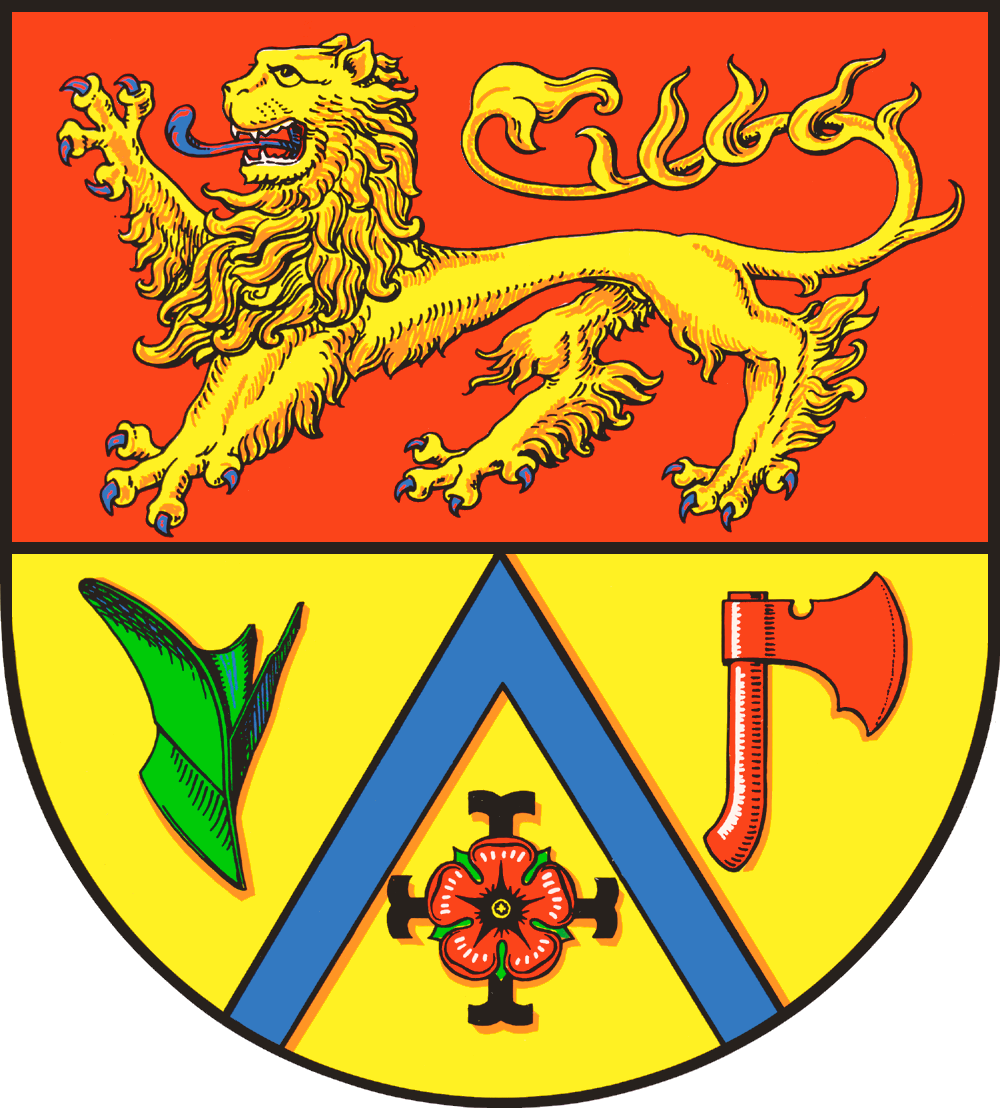
- Coat of arms

- Location of Papenteich within Gifhorn district
- Interactive map of Papenteich
- Location within Germany Location within Lower Saxony
- Coordinates: 52°23′00″N 10°32′00″E
- Country: Germany
- State: Lower Saxony
- District: Gifhorn
- Subdivisions: 6 municipalities

Government
  - Mayor (2021–26): Ines Kielhorn (Ind.)

Area
  - Total: 110.84 km^{2} (42.80 sq mi)
- Elevation: 79 m (259 ft)

Population (2025-12-31)
  - Total: 24,208
  - Density: 218.40/km^{2} (565.67/sq mi)
- Time zone: UTC+01:00 (CET)
  - Summer (DST): UTC+02:00 (CEST)
- Vehicle registration: GF
- Website: www.papenteich.de

Papenteich is a Samtgemeinde in the district of Gifhorn in Lower Saxony, Germany, situated approximately 10 km south of Gifhorn, and 15 km north of Braunschweig. Papenteich was founded on October 2, 1970 and includes 6 local municipalities with 19 villages. At present its population is 23,458.

== Geography ==
=== Structure ===
Papenteich was founded with eighteen member municipalities. With the reform of 1974, five municipalities with eighteen villages were constructed. The last reform was in 1981 with the integration of the village of Didderse as the sixth municipality. The administration of Papenteich is situated in the central village of Meine.

=== Neighbourhood ===
Meinersen	Gifhorn	Isenbüttel
Peine		Wolfsburg
	Braunschweig	Helmstedt

=== Structure of Papenteich ===
Structure of the Samtgemeinde
Municipality	Inhabitants (31. Dez 2003)	Surface: in km^{2}	Population density in inhabitants/km^{2}	Villages
Adenbüttel	1 724	13,71	126	Adenbüttel, Rolfsbüttel
Didderse	1 404	7,41	189	Didderse
Meine	8 070	38,73	207	Abbesbüttel, Bechtsbüttel, Grassel, Gravenhorst, Meine, Meinholz, Martinsbüttel, Ohnhorst, Wedelheine, Wedesbüttel
Rötgesbüttel	2 280	10,83	211	Rötgesbüttel
Schwülper	6 627	20,89	317	Hülperode, Klein Schwülper, Lagesbüttel, Rothemühle, Groß Schwülper, Walle
Vordorf	3 326	19,26	173	Eickhorst, Rethen, Vordorf

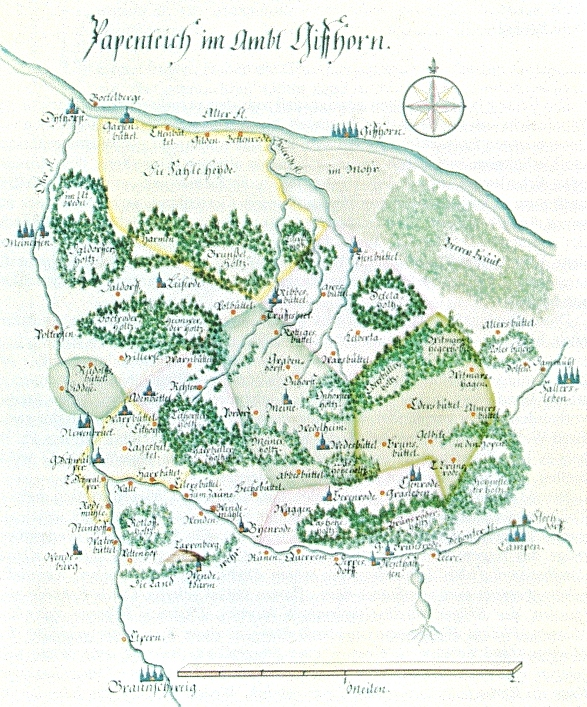
Map of the area Papenteich around the year 1600

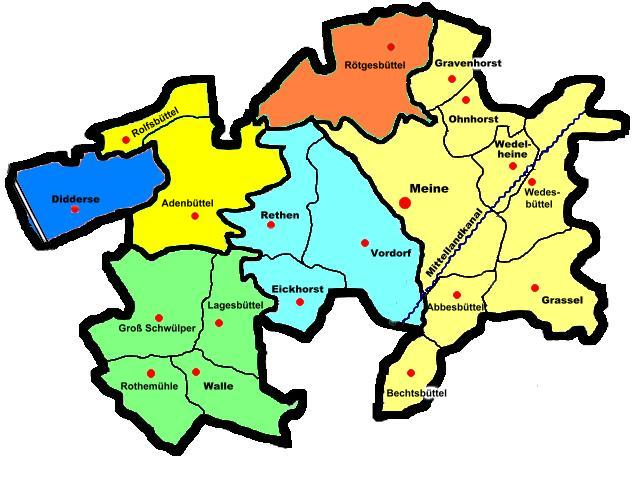
Structure of the Samtgemeinde Papenteich
