= Meine =

- Municipality
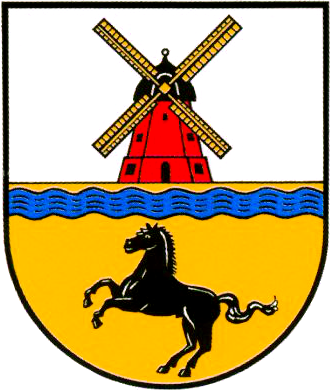
- Coat of arms

- Location of Meine within Gifhorn district
- Interactive map of Meine
- Location within Germany Location within Lower Saxony
- Coordinates: 52°23′N 10°32′E
- Country: Germany
- State: Lower Saxony
- District: Gifhorn
- Municipal assoc.: Papenteich
- Subdivisions: 8 Ortsteile

Government
  - Mayor: Ines Kielhorn (Wählergemeinschaft Meine earlier SPD)

Area
  - Total: 38.73 km^{2} (14.95 sq mi)
- Elevation: 79 m (259 ft)

Population (2025-12-31)
  - Total: 8,241
  - Density: 212.8/km^{2} (551.1/sq mi)
- Time zone: UTC+01:00 (CET)
  - Summer (DST): UTC+02:00 (CEST)
- Postal codes: 38525 - 38527
- Dialling codes: 05304
- Vehicle registration: GF
- Website: www.gemeinde-meine.de

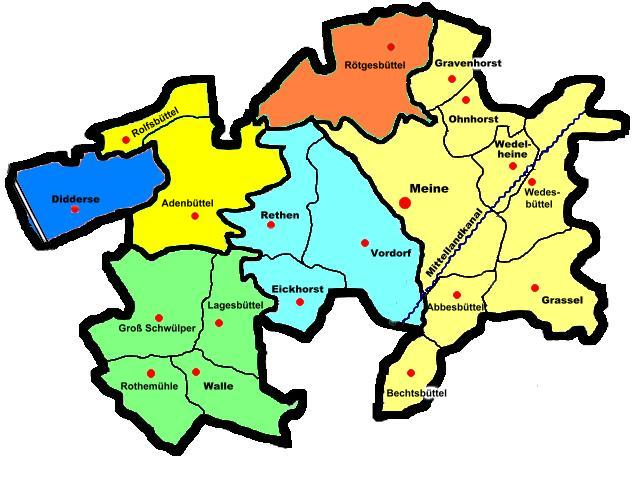
Map of the Papenteich

Meine is a municipality in the district of Gifhorn, in Lower Saxony, Germany. It is a village and member municipality of the Samtgemeinde Papenteich. The Municipality Meine includes the villages of Abbesbüttel, Bechtsbüttel, Grassel, Gravenhorst, Meine, Meinholz, Martinsbüttel, Ohnhorst, Wedelheine, Wedesbüttel.

== Geography ==
=== Neighbourhood ===
* distance from downtown

	City of Gifhorn (13 km)
	Municipality Rötgesbüttel (6 km)	Village Ohnhorst (3 km)
Village Rethen (4 km)		Village Wedelheine (3 km)	City of Wolfsburg (18 km)
Municipality Vordorf (1 km)	Village Abbesbüttel (3 km)	Village Grassel (6 km)
City of Peine (30 km)	City of Braunschweig (17 km)

=== Geographical position ===
Meine is situated north of Braunschweig, between the Harz and the Lüneburg Heath. The Mittellandkanal is crossing the community area. Administratively it belongs to the district of Gifhorn. Meine is situated at the German highway 4 and around 7 km to the north of the interchange Brunswick North (A2 /A391). Other bigger towns nearby are: Wolfsburg, Salzgitter, Wolfenbüttel, Gifhorn, Peine and Celle.

== History ==
The first documentary mentioning of Meine was in the year 1007. In former times the village was known as Meynum. It is expected that Meine is much older and it may have been erected during the Saxon Wars by troops of Charles the Great. From 11th century on, Meine was a frontier town between the Bishopric of Hildesheim and the Bishopric of Halberstadt. The latest significant upturn started with the construction of a Sugar beet factory in 1883. On 18 August 2011 a new grammar school called Philipp Melanchthon Gymnasium was opened in Meine. The headmaster is Stephan Oelker.

== Culture ==
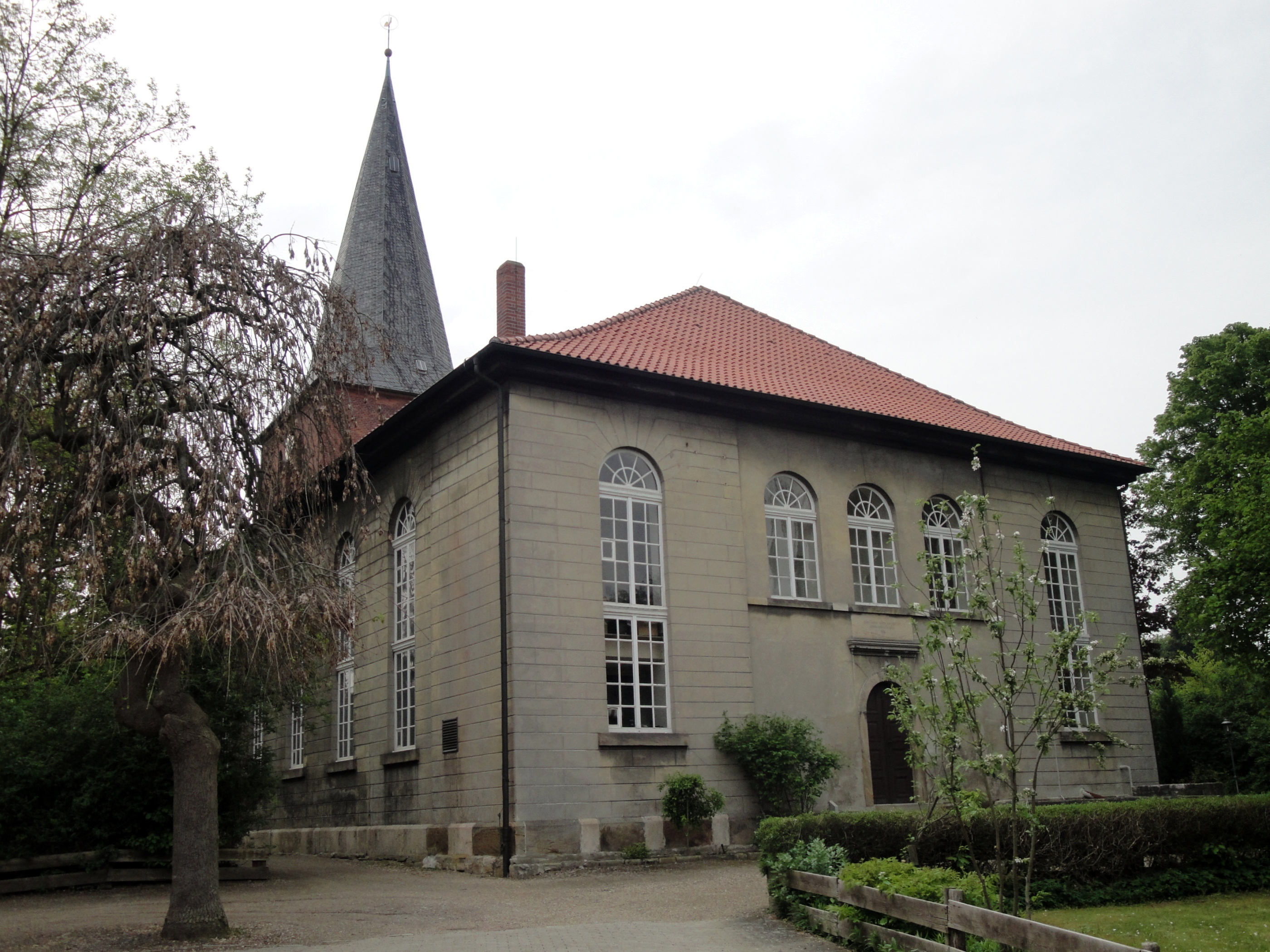
Lutheran St. Stephani church in Meine

=== Religion ===
Meine is by the majority Protestant. It forms an evangelic Parish together with the villages Meine, Abbesbüttel, Wedelheine, Wedesbüttel, Grassel, Gravenhorst, Ohnhorst, Meinholz, Martinsbüttel as well as the village of Vordorf. The catholic church is the Saint Andrew church, built in 1971.

== Politics ==
=== Municipal Council ===
The council of the Municipality Meine consists of 23 councilmen and women:

- Christian Democratic Union 9 mandates
- Social Democratic Party 11 mandates
- Alliance '90/The Greens 3 mandates
- Free Democratic Party 0 mandates
- Others 1 mandate
- Vacant since 2013 1 mandate

(Status: community election 11. September 2011 with a voter participation of 57,98%)
