= Sprakensehl =

- Municipality
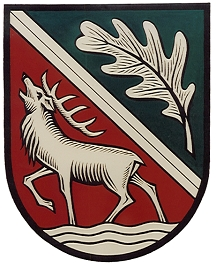
- Coat of arms

- Location of Sprakensehl within Gifhorn district
- Interactive map of Sprakensehl
- Location within Germany Location within Lower Saxony
- Coordinates: 52°46′N 10°30′E
- Country: Germany
- State: Lower Saxony
- District: Gifhorn
- Municipal assoc.: Hankensbüttel
- Subdivisions: 7

Government
  - Mayor: Irmgard Pfeffer (GRÜNE)

Area
  - Total: 83.82 km^{2} (32.36 sq mi)
- Elevation: 115 m (377 ft)

Population (2025-12-31)
  - Total: 1,094
  - Density: 13.05/km^{2} (33.80/sq mi)
- Time zone: UTC+01:00 (CET)
  - Summer (DST): UTC+02:00 (CEST)
- Postal codes: 29365
- Dialling codes: 05837
- Vehicle registration: GF

Sprakensehl is a municipality in the district of Gifhorn, in Lower Saxony, Germany. Sprakensehl includes the villages of Behren, Blickwedel, Bokel, Hagen, Masel, Sprakensehl and Zittel.

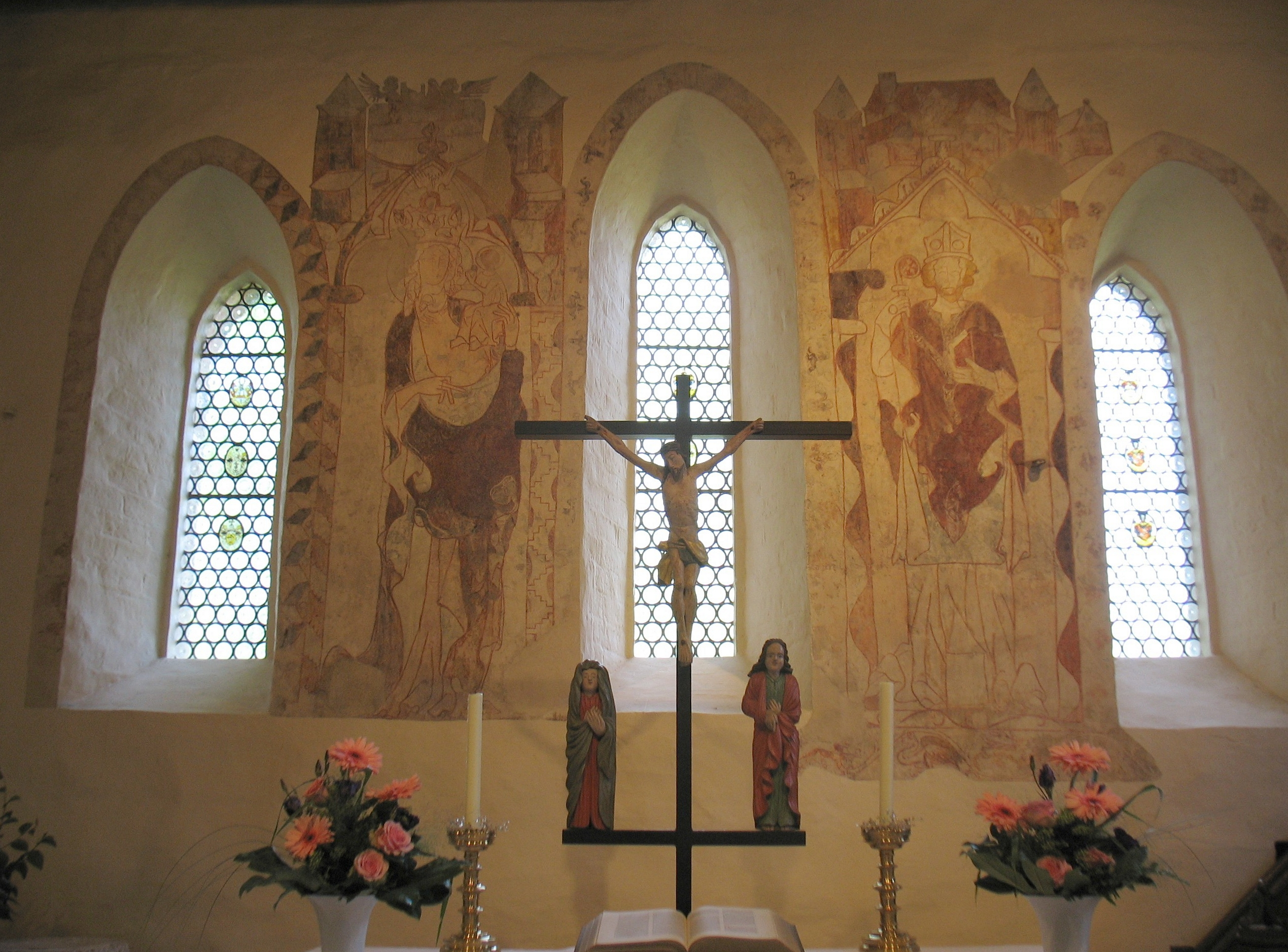
Inside the lutheran church of Sprakensehl
