= Heinrich Decimator =

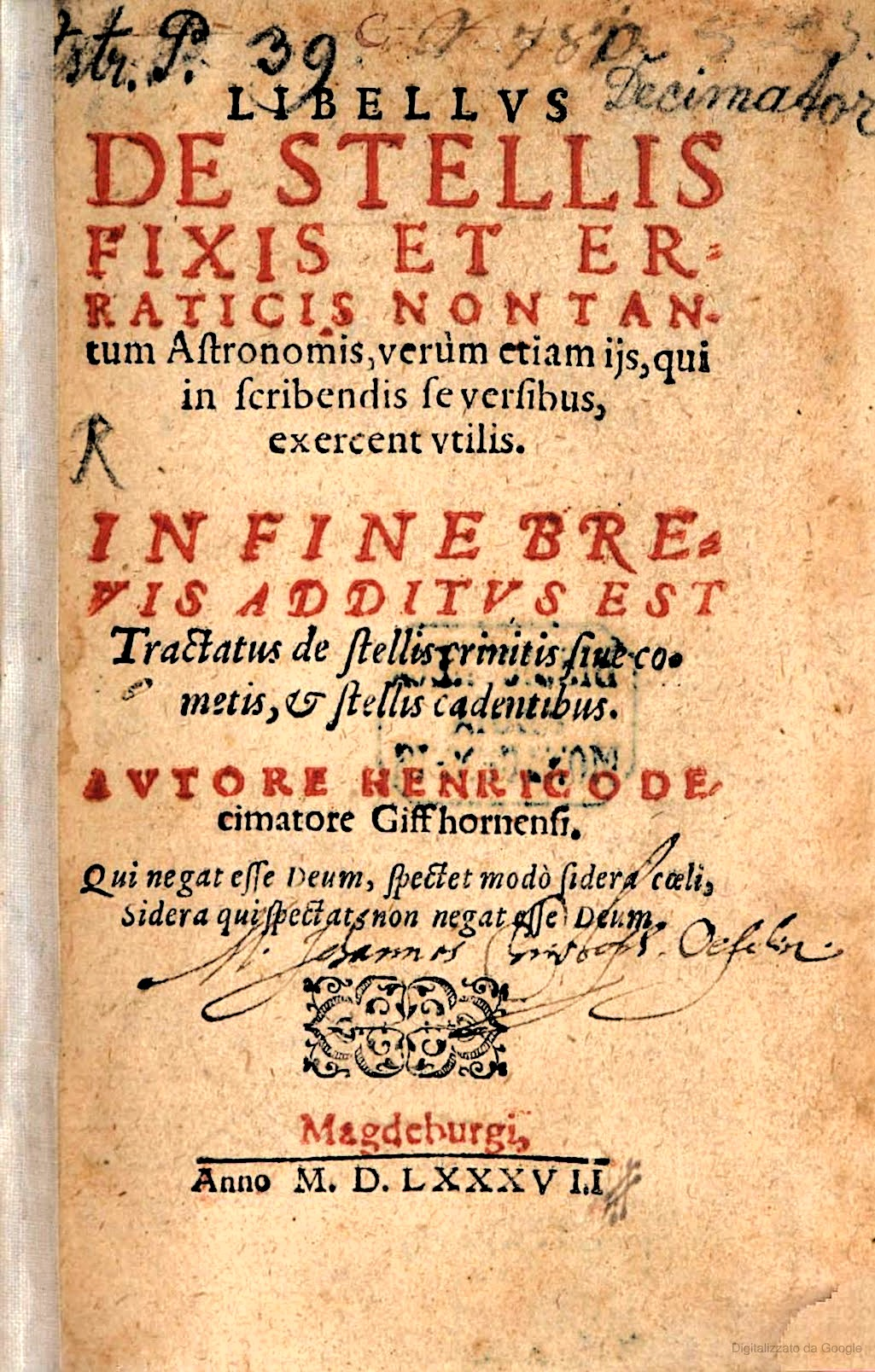
Libellus de stellis fixis et erraticis, 1587

Heinrich Decimator (c. 1544, Gifhorn - 1615) was a German Protestant theologian, astronomer and linguist of Mühlhausen in Thuringen.

He was the son of the pastor Georg Decimator of Dodendorf. He studied theology until 1570 at University of Wittenberg. Then, he became a teacher in Mühlhausen. In 1579, he was ordained the pastor of Schnarsleben. During his tenure as pastor, he published various works, the Sylva vocabulorum, which was an example of plurilingual lexicography, the Thesaurus linguarum in universa vera Europa, a universal dictionary, and Libellus de stellis fixis et erraticis, an astro-poetical work.

== Works ==
- Decimator, Heinrich (1587). Libellus de stellis fixis et erraticis non tantum Astronomis. Magdeburg: Paul Donat.
- Decimator, Heinrich (1606). Megiser, Hieronymus (ed.). Sylva vocabulorum et phrasium octo linguarum. Leipzig: Henning Grosse. — Part 1: German headwords with equivalents in Latin, Greek, Hebrew, Chaldean, and French. Part 2: Dictionary of proper Latin names, human and geographic, with equivalents in Greek and German. Part 3: Thematic dictionary with Latin headwords and equivalents in Greek, Hebrew, Chaldean, French, Italian, German, Dutch, and Spanish.
- Decimator, Heinrich (1613). Thesaurus linguarum. Magdeburg: Johann Francke. — A monolingual Latin dictionary, augmented with equivalents in Greek, Hebrew, French, Italian, and German, to which is appended a compendious dictionary of Latin and Greek equivalents for German words and phrases indexed to the Latin dictionary. In all, some 1600 pages.
