= Wartosław =

- Village
- Location within Poland
- Coordinates: 52°42′56″N 16°17′28″E
- Country: Poland
- Voivodeship: Greater Poland
- County: Szamotuły
- Gmina: Wronki
- Population: 309

Wartosław ([varˈtɔswaf]; German: Neubrück) is a village in the administrative district of Gmina Wronki, within Szamotuły County, Greater Poland Voivodeship, in west-central Poland.
