= Vordorf =

- Municipality
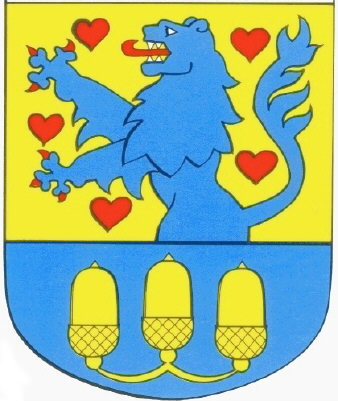
- Coat of arms

- Location of Vordorf within Gifhorn district
- Interactive map of Vordorf
- Location within Germany Location within Lower Saxony
- Coordinates: 52°22′N 10°31′E
- Country: Germany
- State: Lower Saxony
- District: Gifhorn
- Municipal assoc.: Papenteich
- Subdivisions: 3 Ortsteile

Government
  - Mayor: Heinrich Hintze (CDU)

Area
  - Total: 19.26 km^{2} (7.44 sq mi)
- Elevation: 83 m (272 ft)

Population (2025-12-31)
  - Total: 3,123
  - Density: 162.1/km^{2} (420.0/sq mi)
- Time zone: UTC+01:00 (CET)
  - Summer (DST): UTC+02:00 (CEST)
- Postal codes: 38533
- Dialling codes: 05304
- Vehicle registration: GF
- Website: www.vordorf.de

Vordorf is a municipality in the district of Gifhorn, in Lower Saxony, Germany. It is a member municipality of the Samtgemeinde Papenteich. The Municipality Vordorf includes the villages of Eickhorst, Rethen and Vordorf.

== Municipal Council ==
The council of the Municipality Vordorf consists of 15 councilmen and woman:

- CDU 8 mandates (-1)
- SPD 6 mandates (-)
- FDP 1 mandate (+1)

(Status: community election 10 September 2006 with a voter participation of 59,23%)

== Language ==
In former times the everyday speech of Vordorf was an Eastphalian Papenteich Low Saxon dialect, whereas the speech in school and church was Standard German. Nowadays Standard German has displaced the dialect mostly.

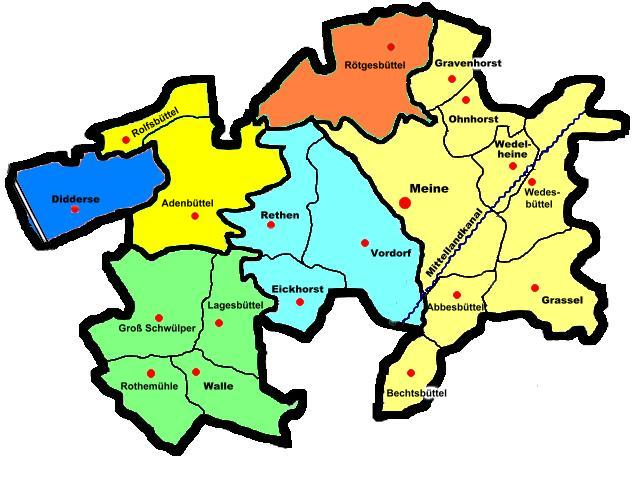
Map of the Papenteich
