= Gifhorn (district) =

District in Lower Saxony, Germany

Coordinates: 52°29′N 10°33′E

- District
- Flag Coat of arms
- Country: Germany
- State: Lower Saxony
- Capital: Gifhorn

Government
  - District admin.: Phillip Raulfs (SPD)

Area
  - Total: 1,563 km^{2} (603 sq mi)

Population (31 December 2023)
  - Total: 175,876
  - Density: 112.5/km^{2} (291.4/sq mi)
- Time zone: UTC+01:00 (CET)
  - Summer (DST): UTC+02:00 (CEST)
- Vehicle registration: GF
- Website: www.gifhorn.de

Gifhorn (German pronunciation: [ˈɡɪfhɔʁn]) is a district in Lower Saxony, Germany.

== Geography ==
The district is located at the border of Saxony-Anhalt and extends from the southern edge of the Lüneburg Heath (Lüneburger Heide) in the north to the suburbs of Braunschweig and Wolfsburg in the south. The Aller River enters the district in the southeast, runs through the town of Gifhorn, is joined by the Ise and Oker river and leaves the district in the west. The southern terminus of the Elbe Lateral Canal at the Mittellandkanal is at Edesbüttel in the district.

It is bounded by (from the south and clockwise) the district of Helmstedt, the cities of Wolfsburg and Braunschweig, the districts of Peine, Hanover, Celle and Uelzen, and by the state of Saxony-Anhalt (districts of Altmarkkreis Salzwedel and Börde).

The lowest point of the administrative district Gifhorn lies at the Aller near Müden (46 m (151 ft) above sea level). The highest point lies in the north of the district near Sprakensehl (124 m (407 ft) above sea level).

== History ==
The district was established in 1885 by the Prussian government. In 1932, the former district of Isenhagen became the northern part of the Gifhorn district. The city of Wolfsburg originally was a part of the district, but became a district-free city in 1951. In 1974 the district again lost parts of its territory, when the city of Fallersleben was incorporated into Wolfsburg.

== Coat of arms ==
The lion as well as the hearts are heraldic symbols of Lüneburg - Gifhorn was a part of the duchy of Brunswick-Lüneburg for many centuries and, briefly the Duchy of Gifhorn. The horn symbolises the syllable "horn" in the word Gifhorn.

== Towns and municipalities ==
Clickable map of towns and municipalities in the district

(numbers of inhabitants from 30 June 2005)

Communities

1. Gifhorn, town, autonomous community (42,658)
2. Sassenburg (10,946) [seat: Westerbeck]
3. Wittingen, town (12,268)

* Seat of Samtgemeinde government

Samtgemeinden with their local communities

1. Boldecker Land
  (9,802)
  1. Barwedel (1,077)
  2. Bokensdorf (950)
  3. Jembke (1,901)
  4. Osloß (1,981)
  5. Tappenbeck (1,245)
  6. Weyhausen* (2,648)
2. Brome
  (15,335)
  1. Bergfeld (952)
  2. Brome* (3,397)
  3. Ehra-Lessien (1,629)
  4. Parsau (1,946)
  5. Rühen (4,672)
  6. Tiddische (1,268)
  7. Tülau (1,471)
3. Hankensbüttel
  (9,739)
  1. Dedelstorf (1,521)
  2. Hankensbüttel* (4,525)
  3. Obernholz (940)
  4. Sprakensehl (1,309)
  5. Steinhorst (1,444)
4. Isenbüttel
  (15,502)
  1. Calberlah (5,236)
  2. Isenbüttel* (6,183)
  3. Ribbesbüttel (2,133)
  4. Wasbüttel (1,950)
5. Meinersen
  (20,944)
  1. Hillerse (2,615)
  2. Leiferde (4,335)
  3. Meinersen* (8,415)
  4. Müden (Aller) (5,579)
6. Papenteich
  (23,458)
  1. Adenbüttel (1,724)
  2. Didderse (1,404)
  3. Meine* (8,070)
  4. Rötgesbüttel (2,280)
  5. Schwülper (6,627)
  6. Vordorf (3,353)
7. Wesendorf
  (14,576)
  1. Groß Oesingen (2,029)
  2. Schönewörde (983)
  3. Ummern (1,593)
  4. Wagenhoff (1,150)
  5. Wahrenholz (3,839)
  6. Wesendorf* (4,982)

Area without community (uninhabited)

- Giebel (10.36 km^{2} (4.00 sq mi))

== See also ==
- Metropolitan region Hannover-Braunschweig-Göttingen-Wolfsburg
