= Schwülper =

- Municipality
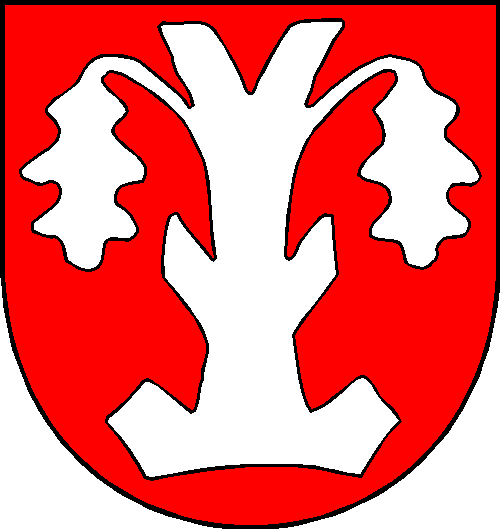
- Coat of arms

- Location of Schwülper within Gifhorn district
- Interactive map of Schwülper
- Location within Germany Location within Lower Saxony
- Coordinates: 52°20′N 10°27′E
- Country: Germany
- State: Lower Saxony
- District: Gifhorn
- Municipal assoc.: Papenteich
- Subdivisions: 6

Government
  - Mayor: Uwe-Peter Lestin (SPD)

Area
  - Total: 20.89 km^{2} (8.07 sq mi)
- Elevation: 64 m (210 ft)

Population (2025-12-31)
  - Total: 7,250
  - Density: 347/km^{2} (899/sq mi)
- Time zone: UTC+01:00 (CET)
  - Summer (DST): UTC+02:00 (CEST)
- Postal codes: 38179
- Dialling codes: 05303
- Vehicle registration: GF
- Website: www.papenteich.de

Schwülper is a municipality in the district of Gifhorn, in Lower Saxony, Germany. It is a member municipality of the Samtgemeinde Papenteich. The Municipality Schwülper includes the villages of Groß Schwülper, Hülperode, Klein Schwülper, Lagesbüttel, Rothemühle, and Walle

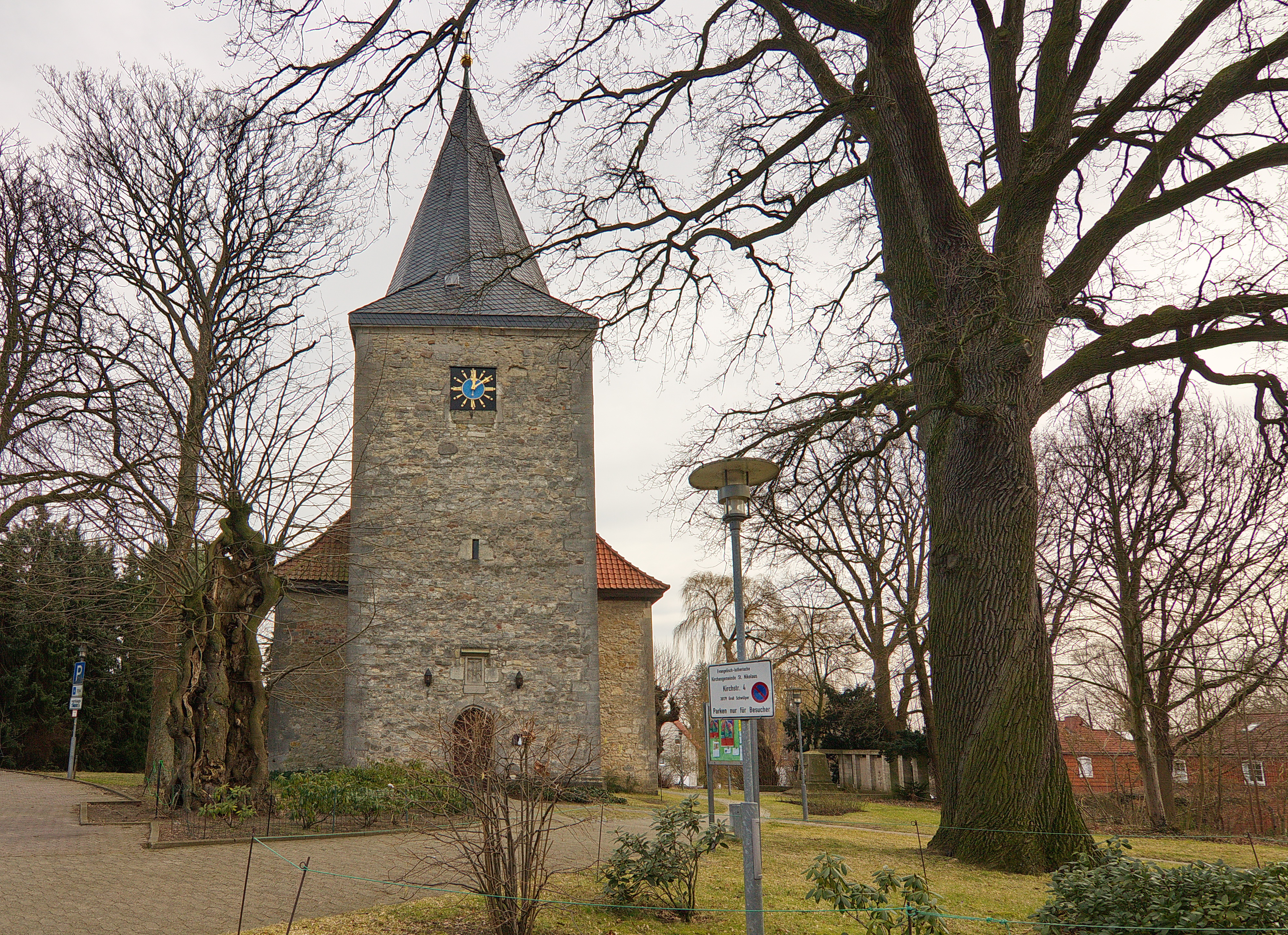
The Lutheran church in Groß Schwülper

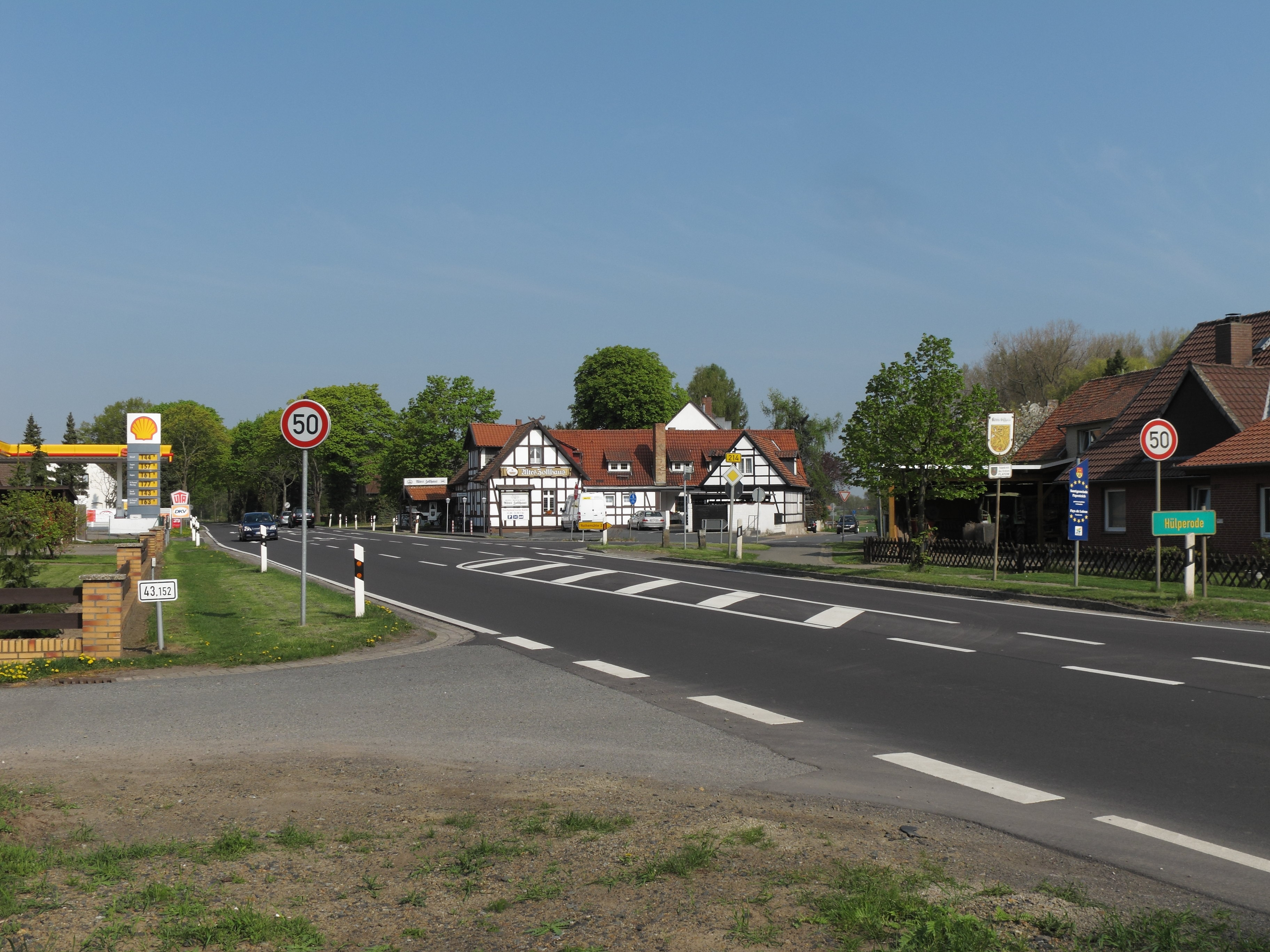
Main street in Hülperode

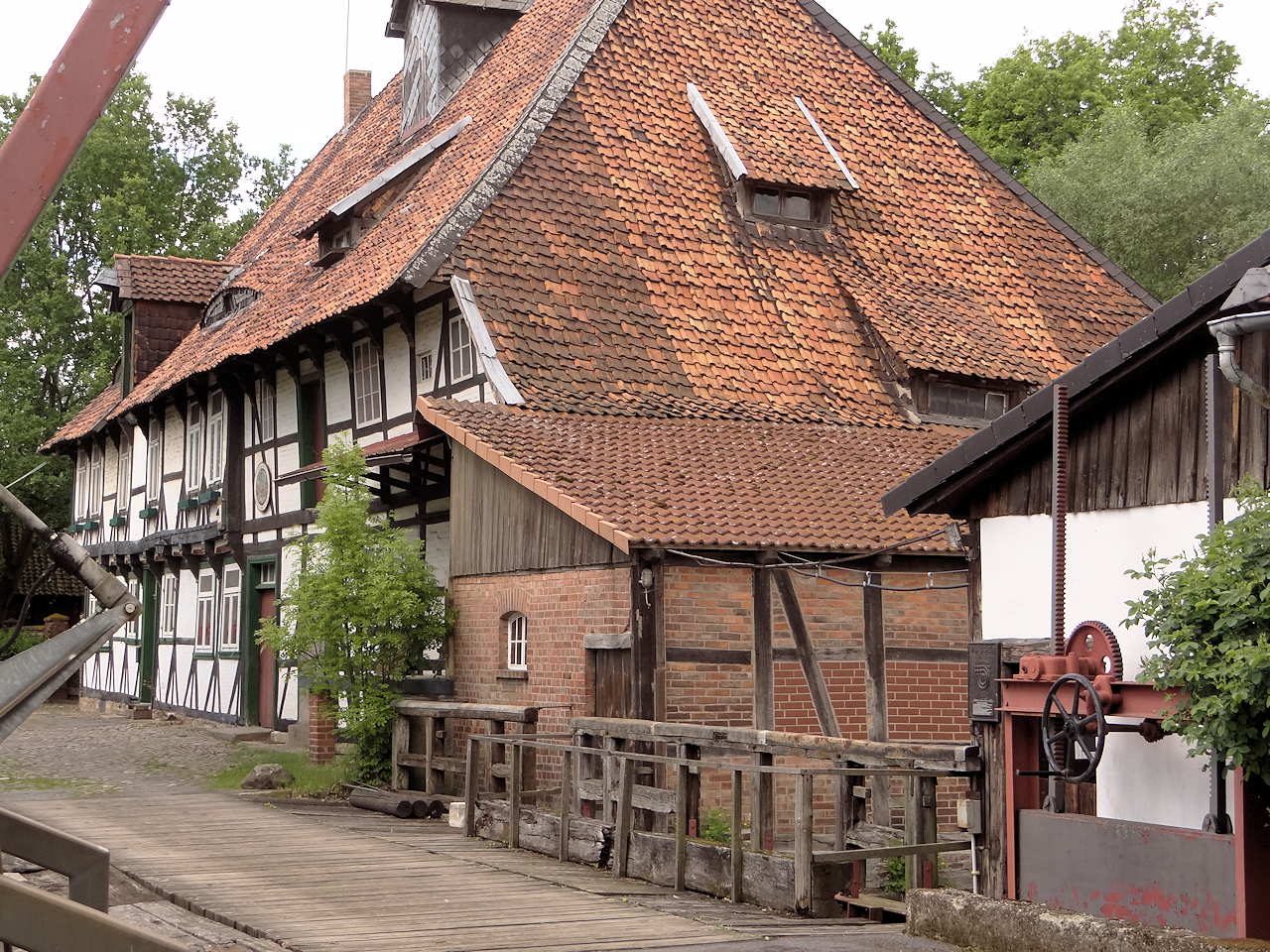
Old watermill in Rothemühle

== Municipal Council ==
The council of the Municipality Schwülper consists of 20 councilmen and woman:

- Christian Democratic Union 8 mandates
- Social Democratic Party 12 mandates

(Status: community election 10. September 2006 with a voter participation of 57,52%)

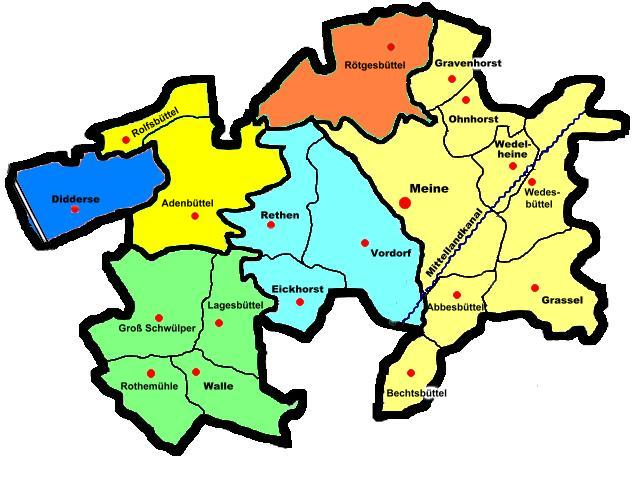
Map of the Papenteich
