= Ribbesbüttel =

- Municipality
- Location of Ribbesbüttel within Gifhorn district
- Interactive map of Ribbesbüttel
- Location within Germany Location within Lower Saxony
- Coordinates: 52°26′N 10°31′E
- Country: Germany
- State: Lower Saxony
- District: Gifhorn
- Municipal assoc.: Isenbüttel
- Subdivisions: 3

Government
  - Mayor: Hans-Werner Buske (CDU)

Area
  - Total: 24.51 km^{2} (9.46 sq mi)
- Elevation: 58 m (190 ft)

Population (2025-12-31)
  - Total: 2,104
  - Density: 85.84/km^{2} (222.3/sq mi)
- Time zone: UTC+01:00 (CET)
  - Summer (DST): UTC+02:00 (CEST)
- Postal codes: 38551
- Dialling codes: 05374
- Vehicle registration: GF
- Website: www.ribbesbuettel.de

Ribbesbüttel is a municipality in the district of Gifhorn, in Lower Saxony, Germany. The Municipality Ribbesbüttel includes the villages of Ausbüttel, Druffelbeck, Ribbesbüttel, Vollbüttel and Warmbüttel.

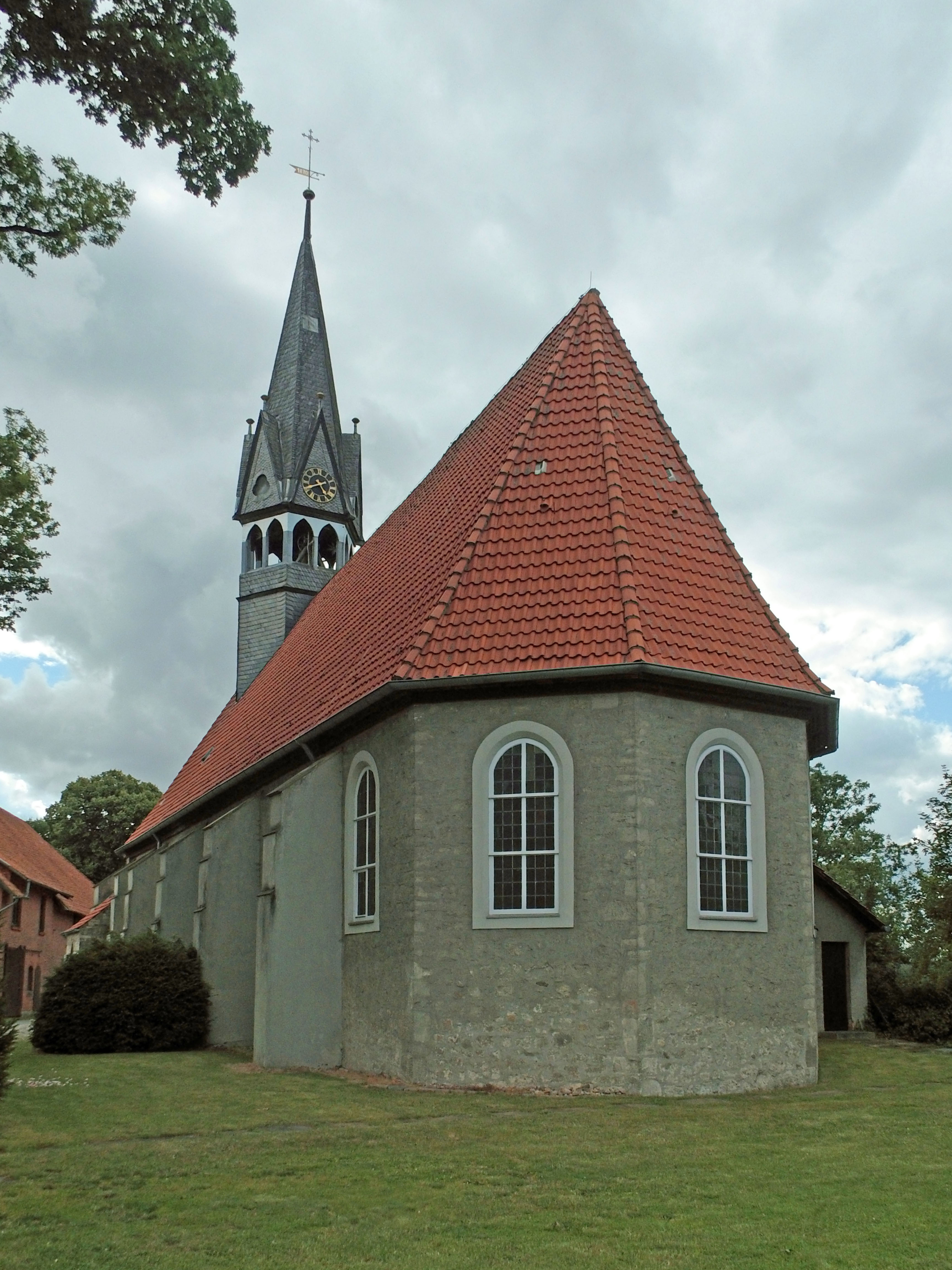
The lutheran church
