= Gifhorn =

- Town
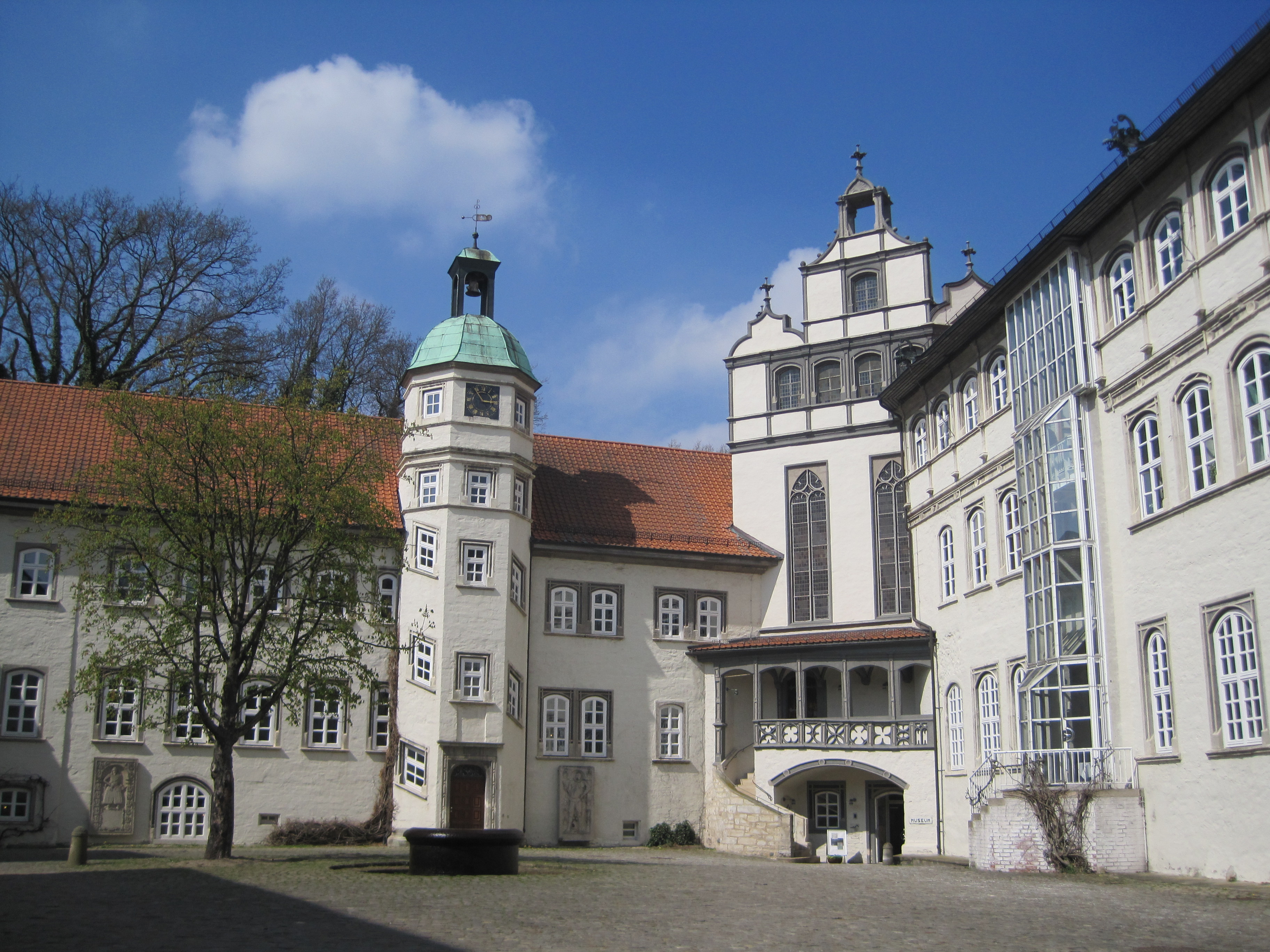
- Gifhorn Castle

- Coat of arms

- Location of Gifhorn within Gifhorn district
- Interactive map of Gifhorn
- Location within Germany Location within Lower Saxony
- Coordinates: 52°29′19″N 10°32′47″E
- Country: Germany
- State: Lower Saxony
- District: Gifhorn
- Subdivisions: 6 districts

Government
  - Mayor (2019–24): Matthias Nerlich (CDU)

Area
  - Total: 105.39 km^{2} (40.69 sq mi)
- Elevation: 50–68 m (164–223 ft)

Population (2025-12-31)
  - Total: 42,816
  - Density: 406.26/km^{2} (1,052.2/sq mi)
- Time zone: UTC+01:00 (CET)
  - Summer (DST): UTC+02:00 (CEST)
- Postal codes: 38501–38510, 38516, 38518
- Dialling codes: 05371
- Vehicle registration: GF
- Website: www.stadt-gifhorn.de

Gifhorn (German pronunciation: [ˈɡɪfhɔʁn]) is a town and capital of the district of Gifhorn in the east of Lower Saxony, Germany. It has a population of about 42,000 and is mainly influenced by the small distance to the more industrial and commercially important cities nearby, Brunswick and Wolfsburg. Further, Gifhorn is part of the Hanover-Brunswick-Göttingen-Wolfsburg Metropolitan Region. The Municipality Gifhorn includes the villages of Gamsen, Gifhorn, Kästorf, Neubokel, Wilsche and Winkel.

== Sights ==
Gifhorn is home to the International Wind- and Watermill Museum, which contains a comprehensive collection and working replicas of the world's most common windmills. The castle in the town centre was built in a Weser Renaissance style from 1526 to 1533. Kavalierhaus (Cavalier House) is a renaissance building dating from 1546. Saint Nicolai Church is a baroque aisleless church which was built from 1734 to 1744. Around the Market Place various well-preserved half-timbered houses built in the 16th and 17th centuries can be visited, e.g. the Old Town Hall with impressive wood sculptures dating from 1562. Some houses have interesting bay windows. House no. 2 in Steinweg street, called Höfersches Haus and dating from 1570, is considered to be one of the oldest houses in town.

== Geography ==
Gifhorn lies at the confluence of the Rivers Ise and Aller. Gifhorn is situated about 20 km (12 mi) north of the city of Brunswick and about 15 km (9 mi) west of Wolfsburg. In the city, the Bundesstraße 4 and 188 meet. At the northern end of the city, the Lüneburg Heath starts.

== History ==
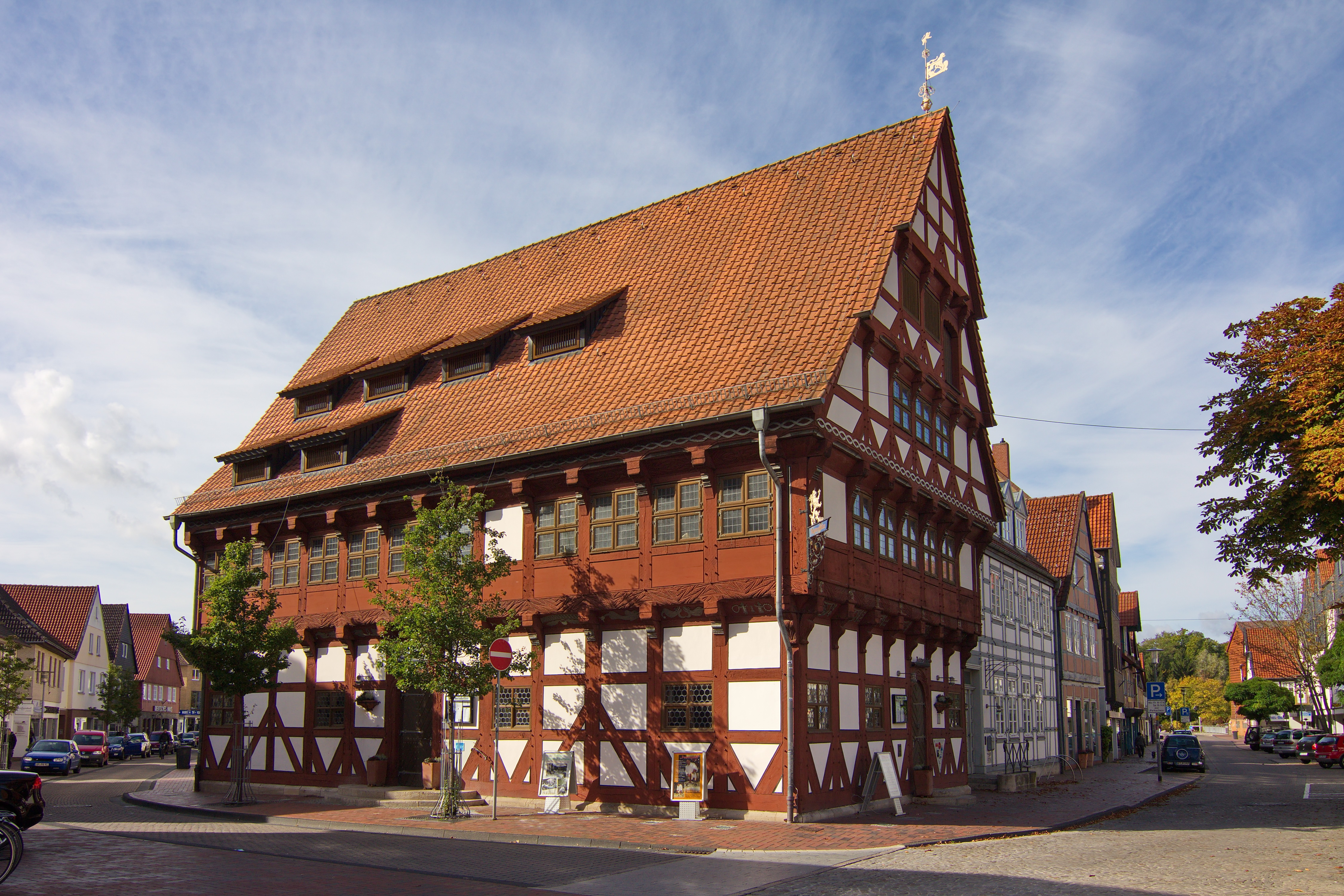
Old Town Hall

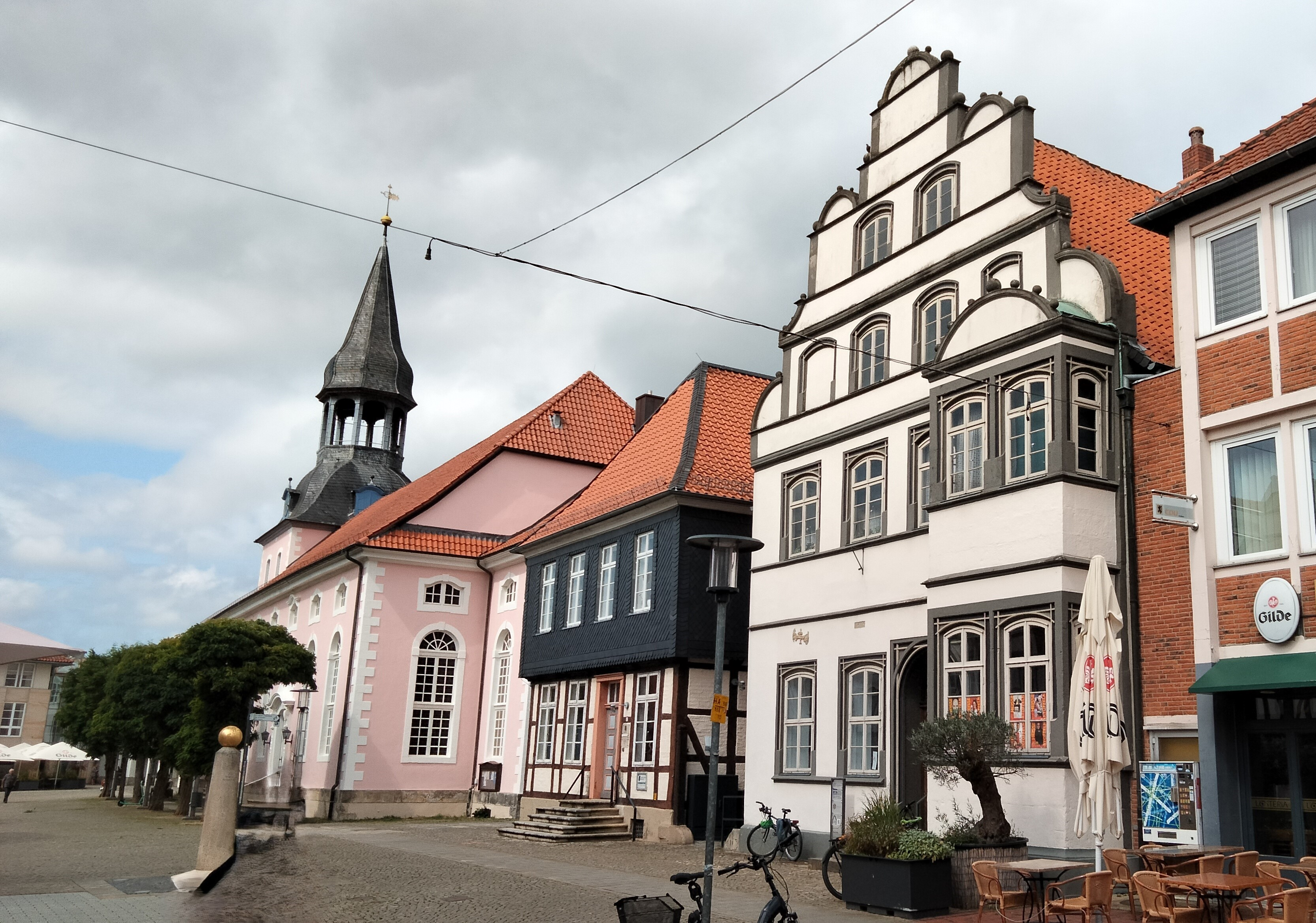
St. Nicolai Church and Kavalierhaus (1546)

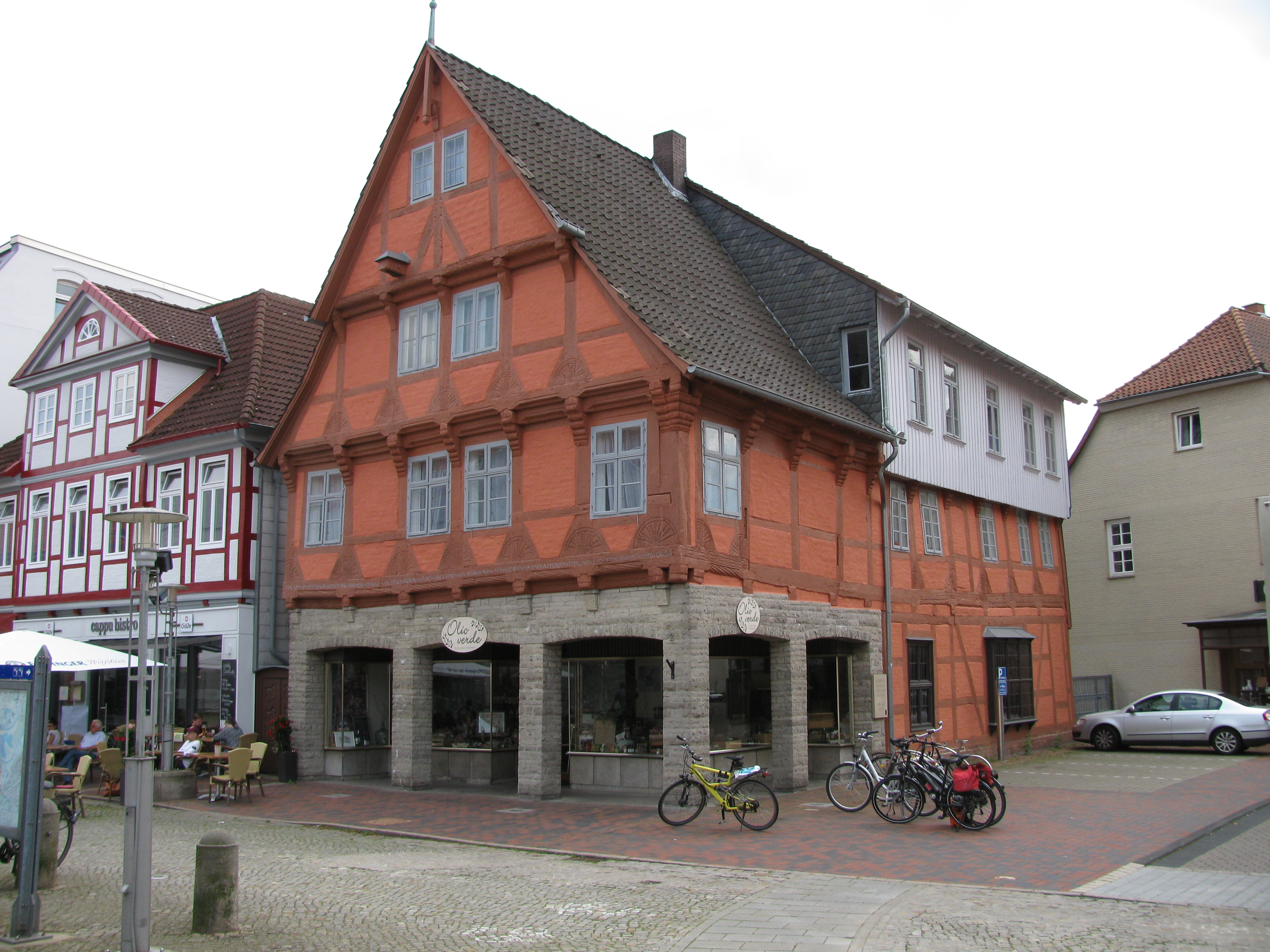
Höfersches Haus dating from 1570

The oldest verifiable source attests the existence of the city in the year 1057. It was located at the crossing of two then important merchant routes: the salt street (German: Salzstraße) being a main trading route for salt between Lüneburg and Brunswick, and the grain street (German: Kornstraße) transporting grain between Celle and Magdeburg. Market rights were certified by John, Duke of Brunswick-Lüneburg in 1275. Gifhorn was destroyed in the Hildesheim Diocesan Feud (1519-1523) and rebuilt afterwards. During the Thirty Years' War it suffered again severe destruction. The southern part of Gifhorn, a densely populated area, was devastated by a fire in 1669, and the northern part in 1725. Afterwards Gifhorn was rebuilt keeping an appropriate distance between the buildings. Gifhorn obtained town privileges in 1852 when it had about 2,500 inhabitants. During World War II the town remained undamaged.

== Education ==
Schools in Gifhorn include the Humboldt Gymnasium, the Otto-Hahn-Gymnasium, Fritz-Reuter-Realschule, Dietrich-Bonhoeffer-Realschule, Albert-Schweitzer-Hauptschule and the Berufsbildenden Schulen I and II. Alfred-Teves-Schule, which was called Volksschule Süd between 1954 and 1958, was open between 1954 and 2010.

== Transport ==
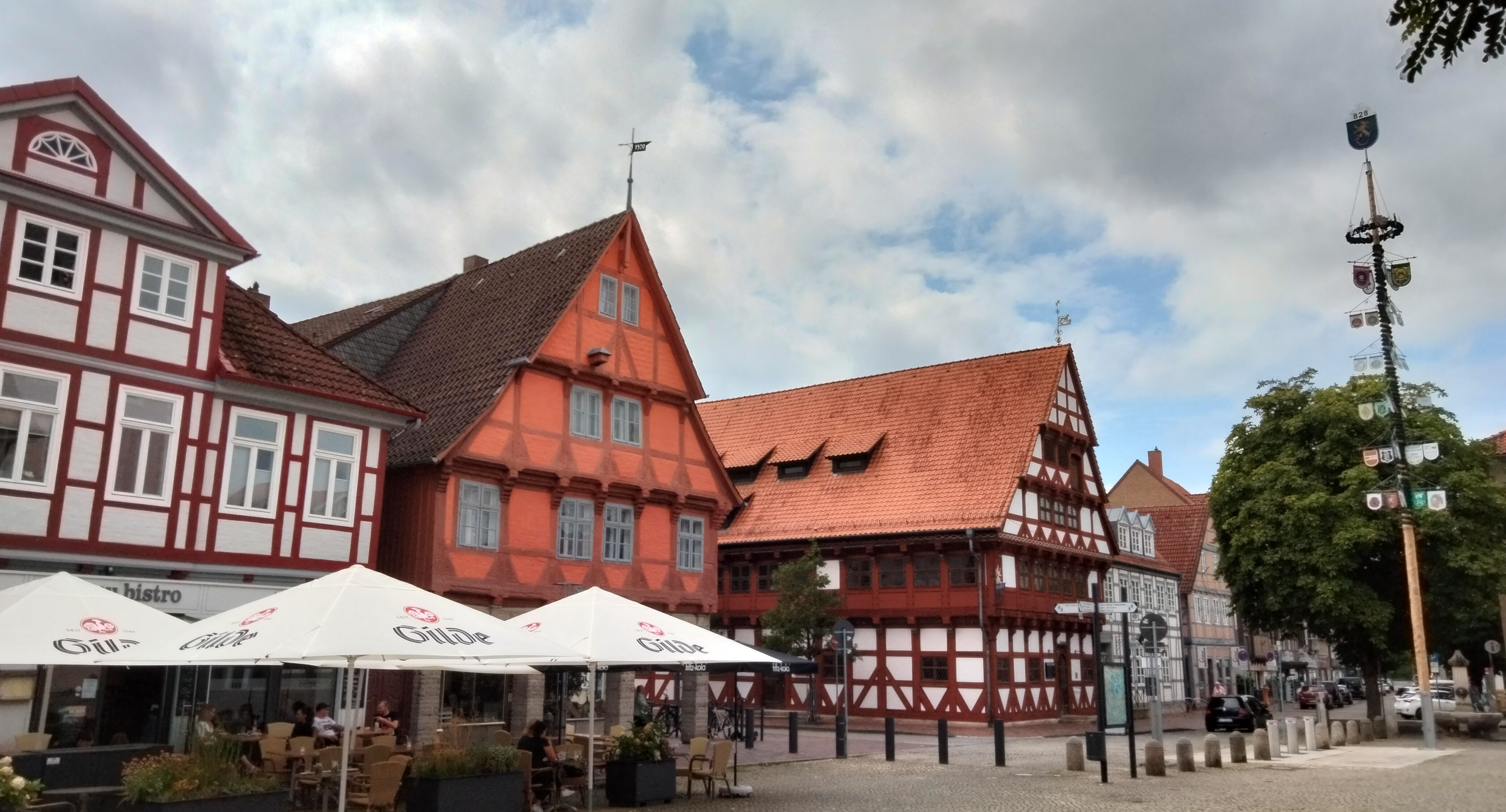
Market Place

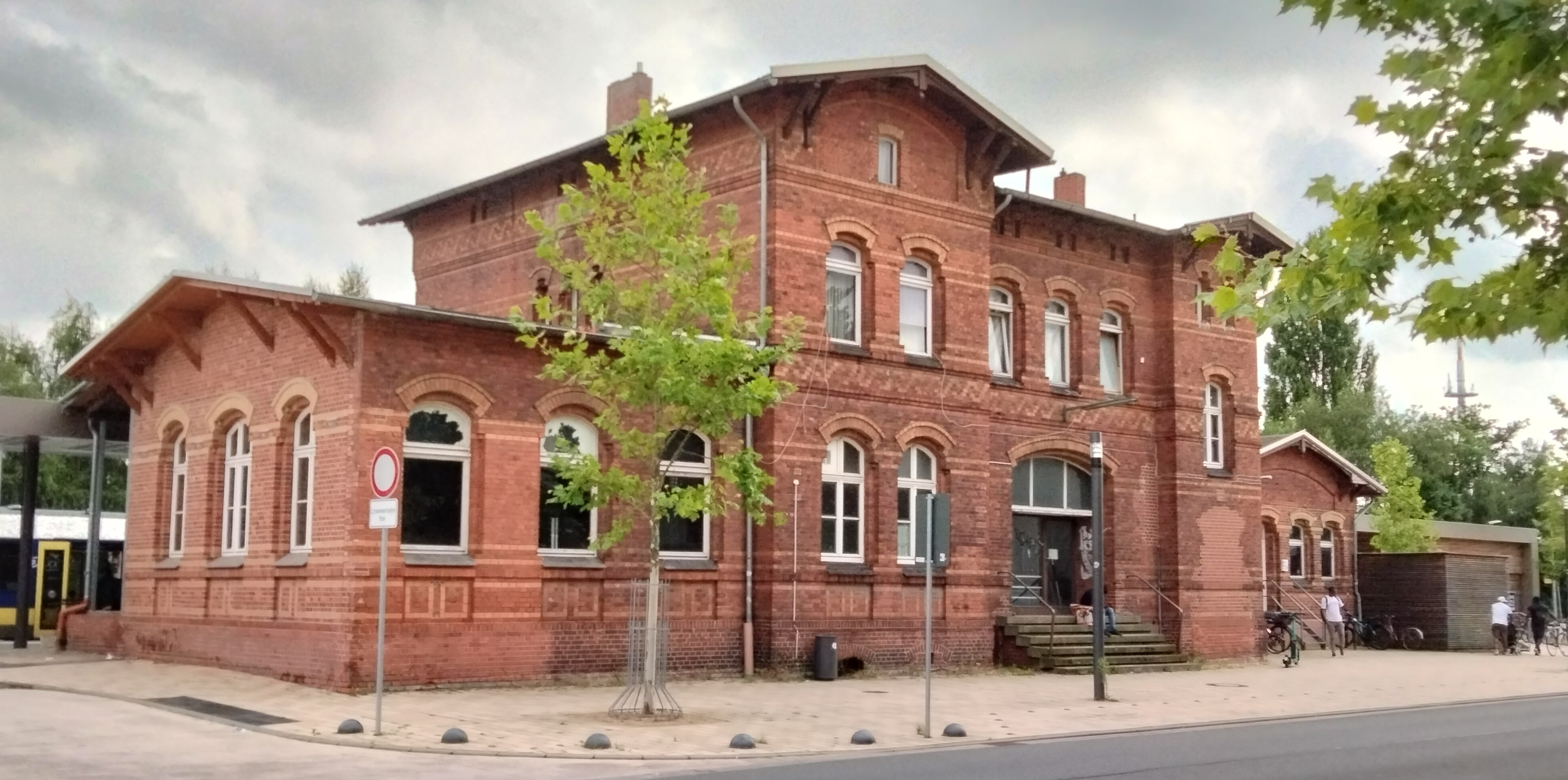
Gifhorn Stadt Station

The Gifhorn railway station where trains from and to Hanover and Wolfsburg stop is in the southern part of the town. A smaller railway station, "Gifhorn Stadt" station with direct connections to Uelzen and Brunswick, is in the centre on the Brunswick–Uelzen railway line.

In the city, the Bundesstraße 4 and 188 meet.

== The Bells Palace ==
Glocken-Palast, or The Bells Palace, is a monument and large building in Gifhorn. It was completed after 16 years of construction, combining various Russian timber building styles. Its cornerstone was laid by former General Secretary of the Communist Party of the Soviet Union Mikhail Gorbachev in 1996.

It was built as a centre to promote cultural exchange across Europe, following the fall of the Iron Curtain.

The Bells Palace will host events and exhibitions celebrating peace, freedom and cultural diversity.

== Twin towns – sister cities ==
Gifhorn is twinned with:

- Dumfries, United Kingdom
- Gardelegen, Germany
- Hallsberg, Sweden
- Korsun-Shevchenkivskyi, Ukraine
- Xanthi, Greece

== Notable people ==
- Heinrich Decimator (c. 1544 – c. 1615), clergyman, author of a universal dictionary (1st edition 1580: German, Latin and Greek, later Hebrew and French added)
- Thorsten Heins (born 1957), manager
- Anna Montanaro (born 1973), musical actress and actress
- Kay-Sölve Richter (born 1974), journalist and newsreader (ZDF)
- Katharina Marie Schubert (born 1977), theater and film actress
- Fabian Klos (born 1987), footballer
- Senta-Sofia Delliponti (born 1990), actress and singer
- Bjarne Thoelke (born 1992), footballer
- Luis Michael Dörrbecker (born 1993), Mexican racing driver
