= Museums of the inner German border =

Museum in Germany

Numerous museums of the inner German border are located along the course of the former border between East and West Germany, documenting its story and in some places preserving original elements of the border fortifications.

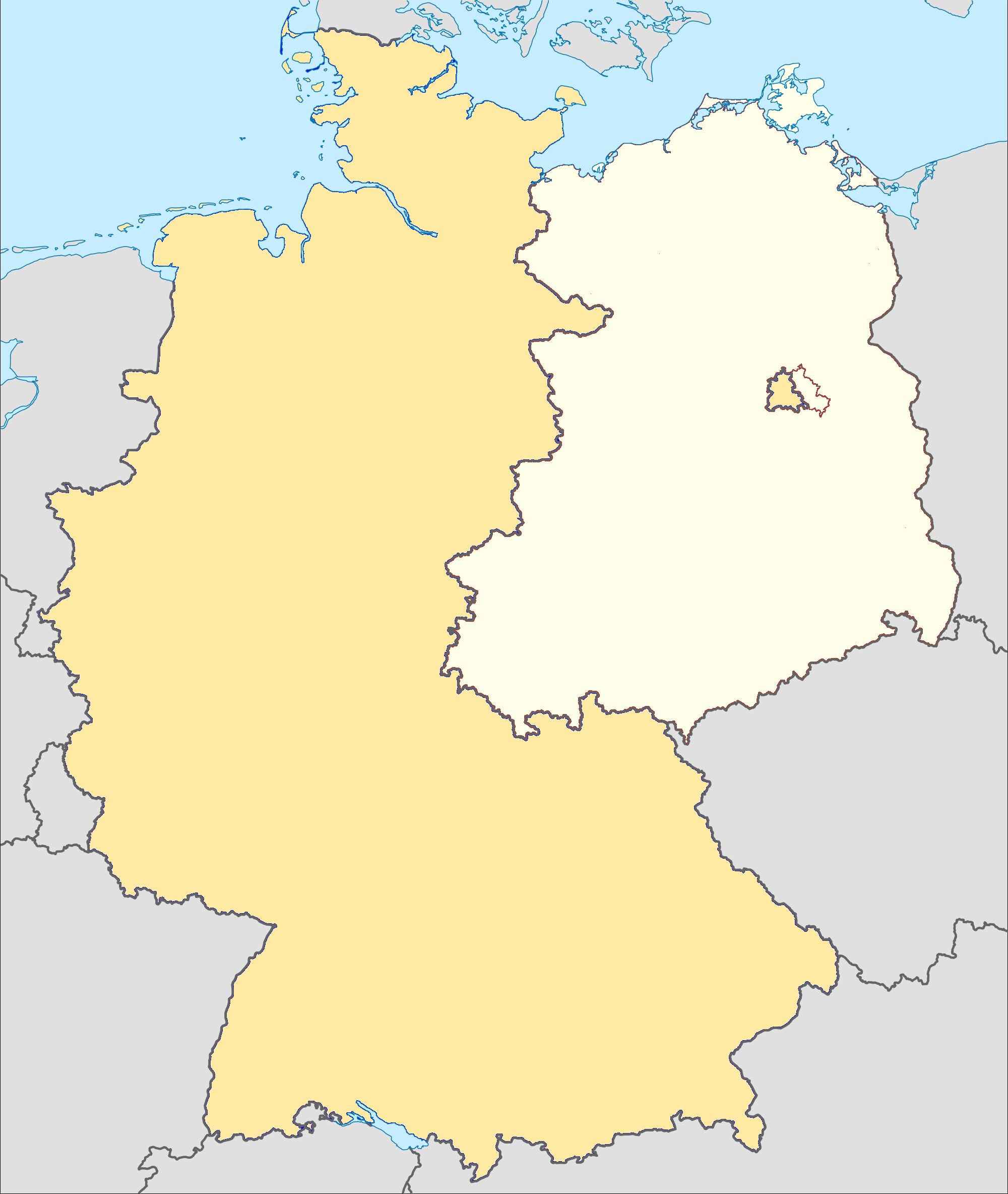
Locations of the museums overlaid on a Cold War Era German map

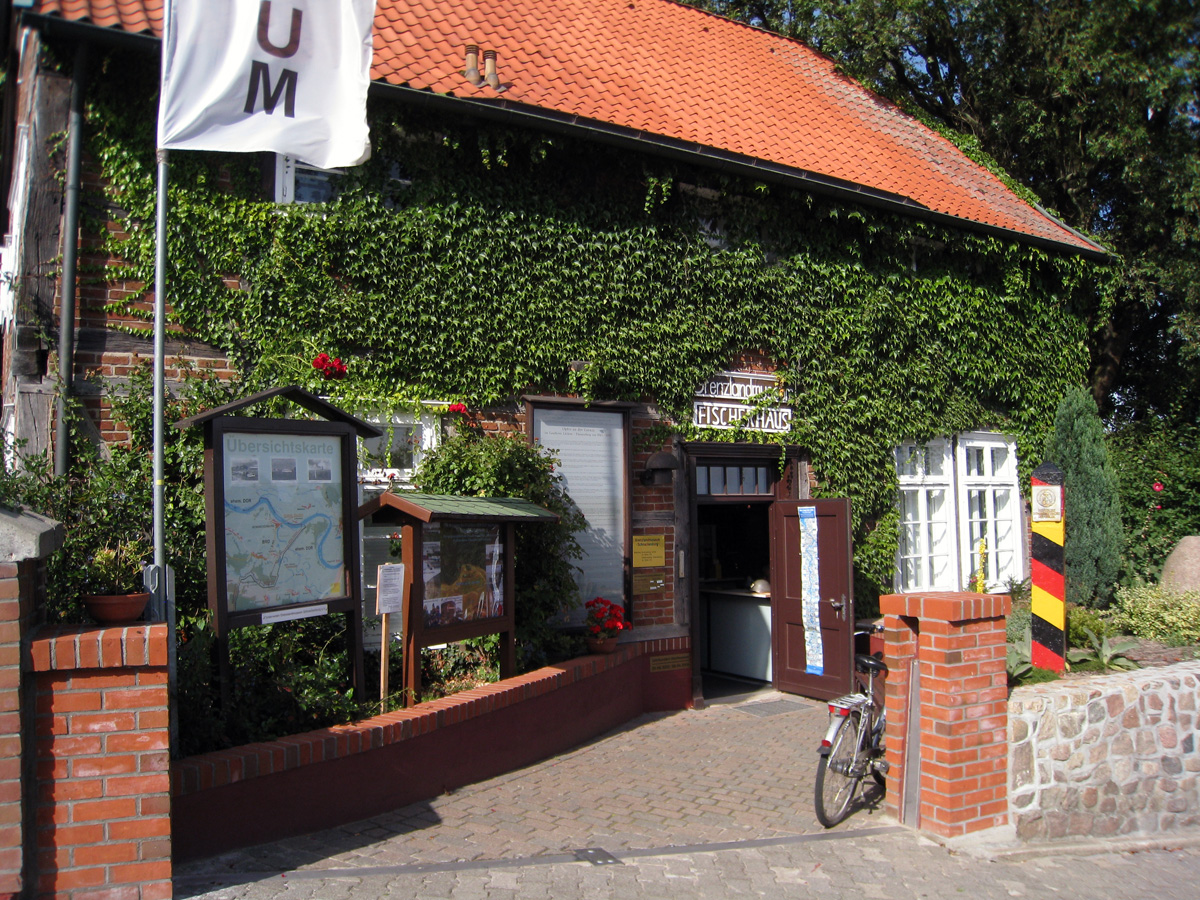
Exterior of the Grenzlandmuseum Schnackenburg

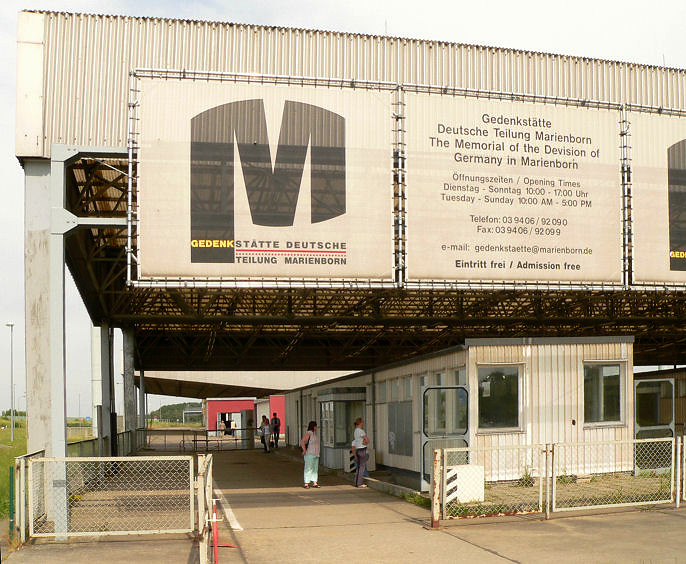
Entrance to the former East German border crossing facility at the Gedenkstätte Deutsche Teilung Marienborn

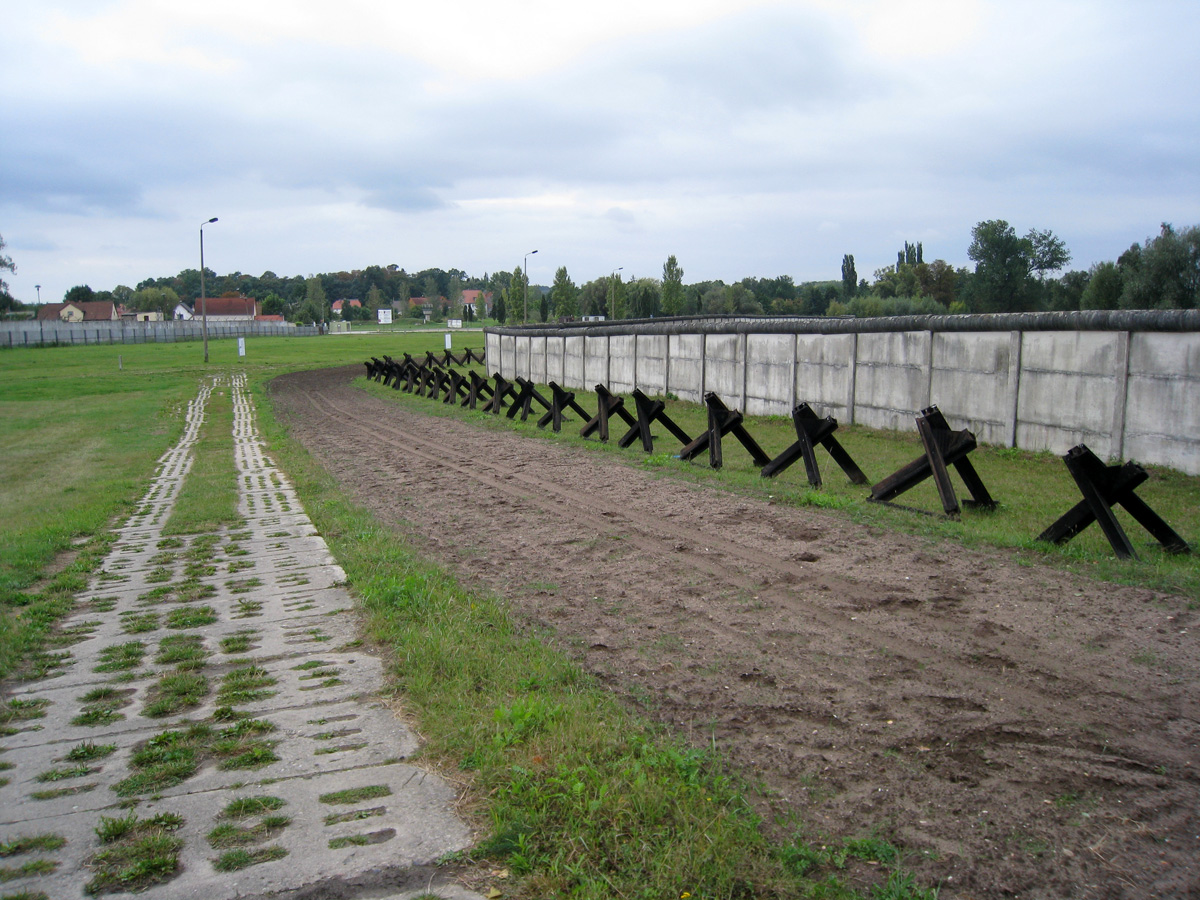
Preserved border fortifications at the Grenzdenkmal Hötensleben

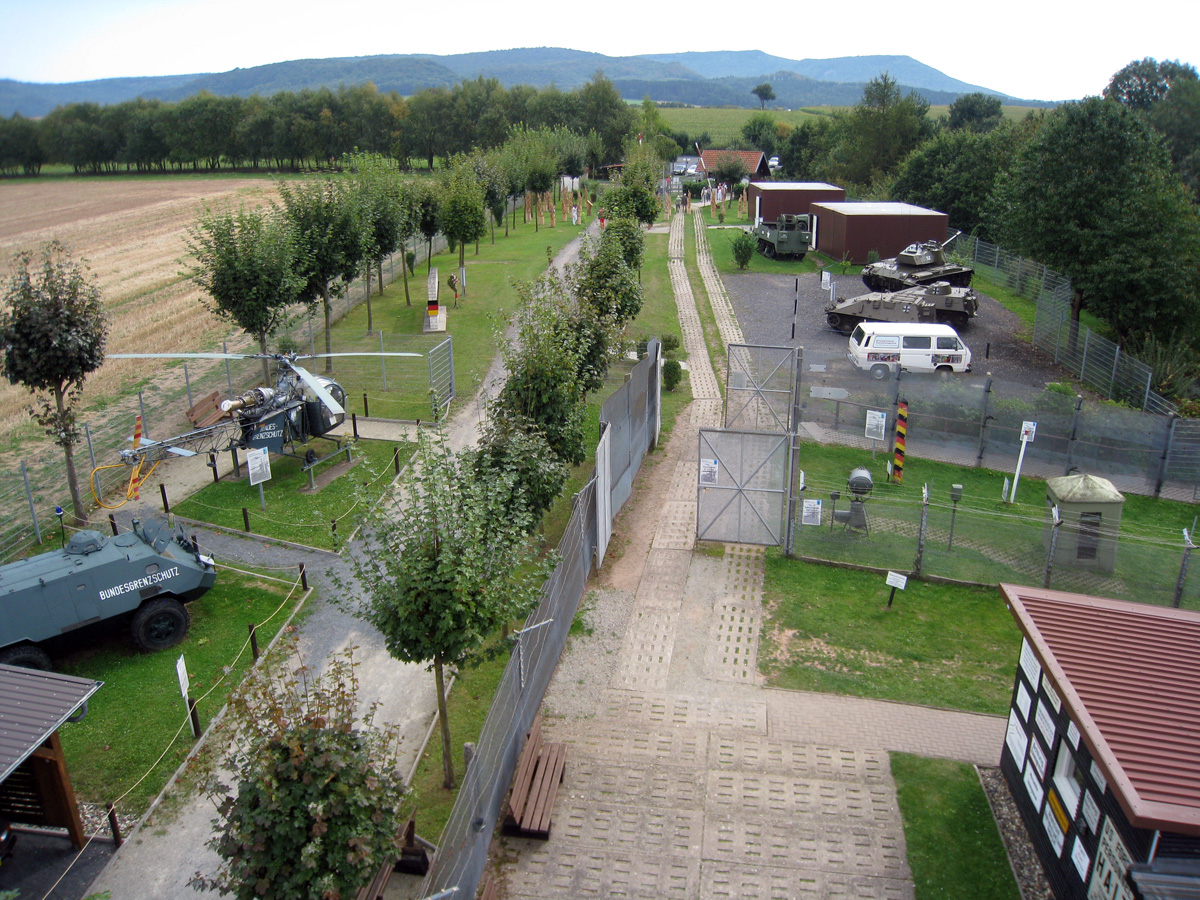
Outdoor exhibits at the Grenzmuseum Schifflersgrund

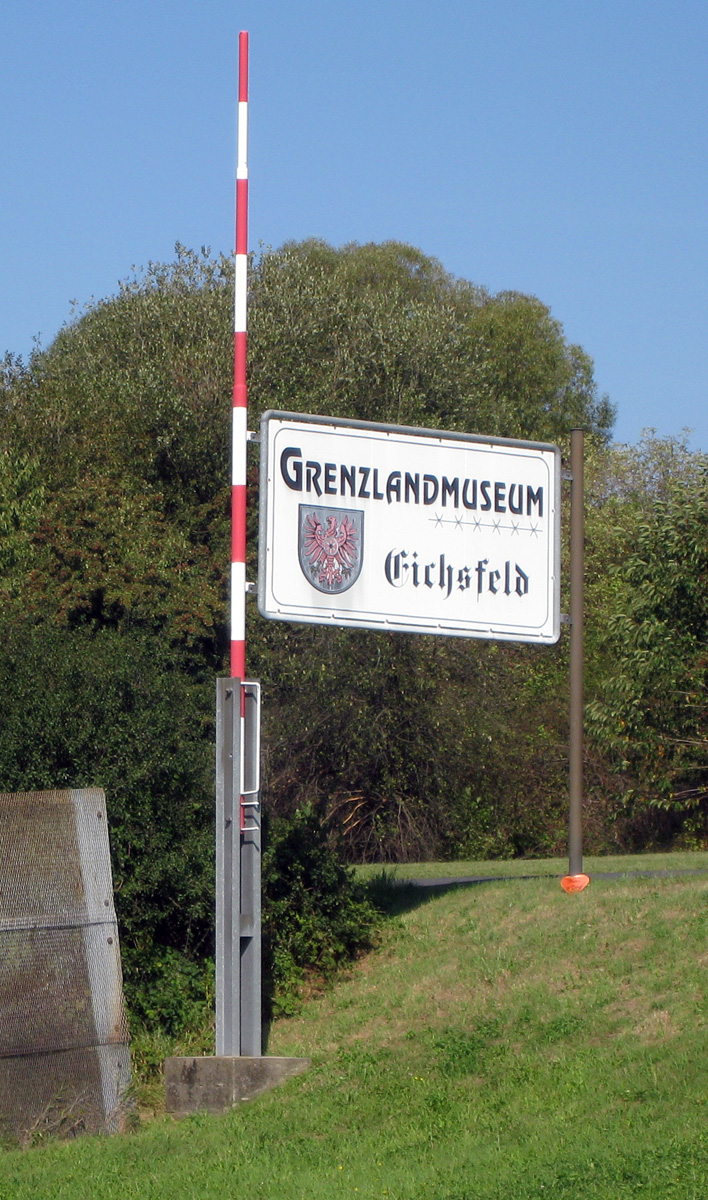
Sign at the Borderland Museum Eichsfeld

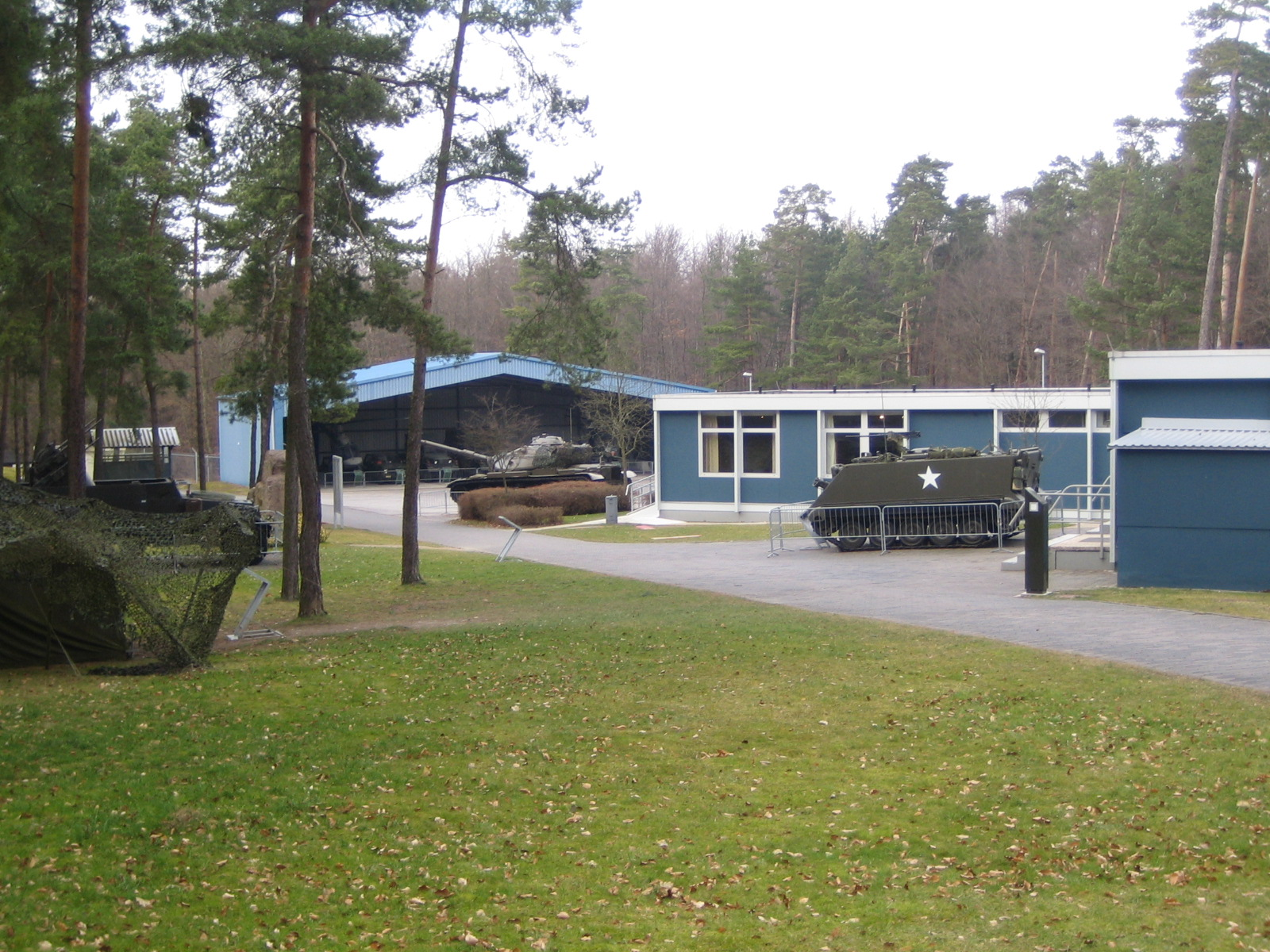
The former US Army compound at Observation Post Alpha, now part of the Gedenkstätte Point Alpha

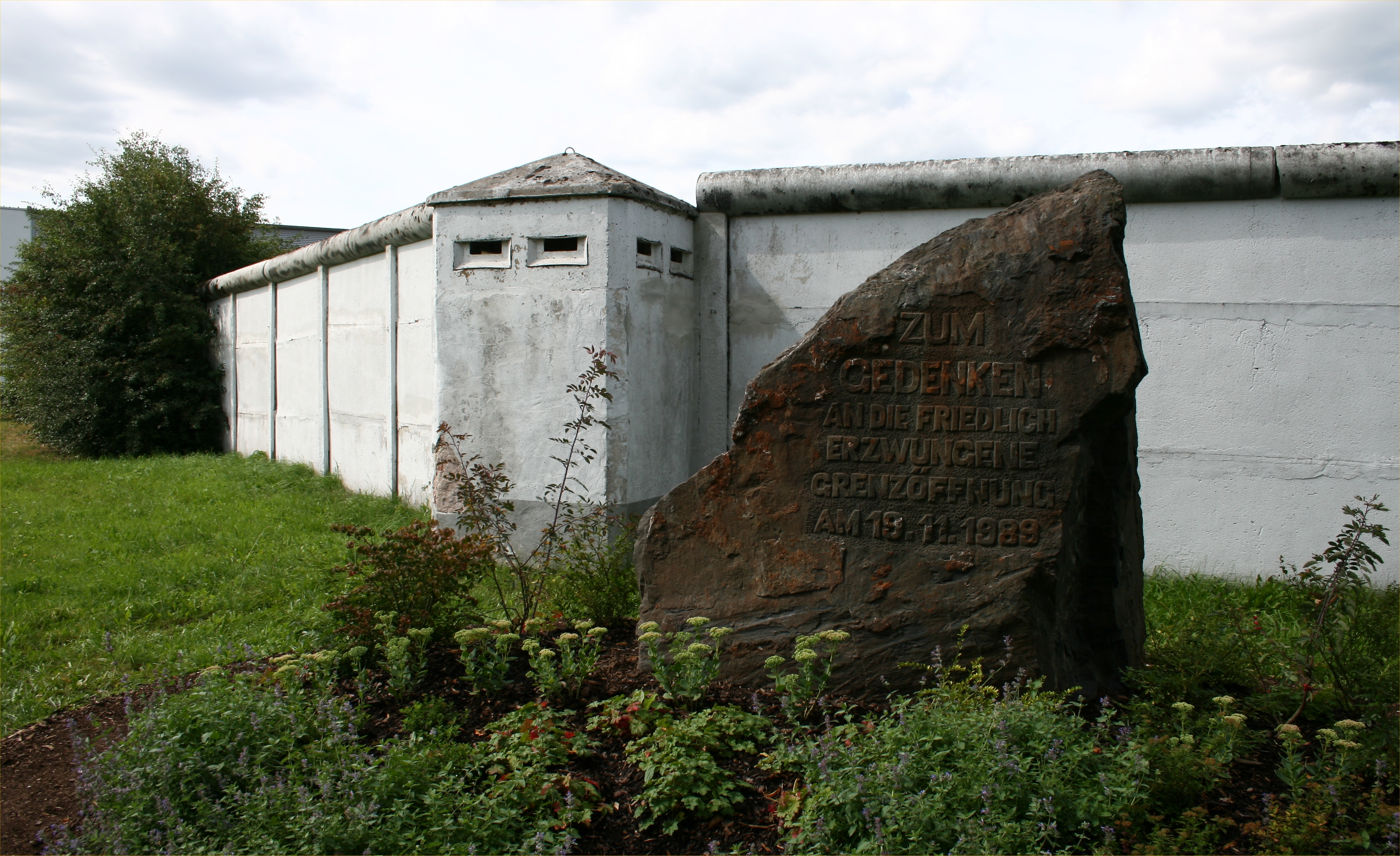
The preserved border wall at the Gedenkstätte Heinersdorf-Welitsch

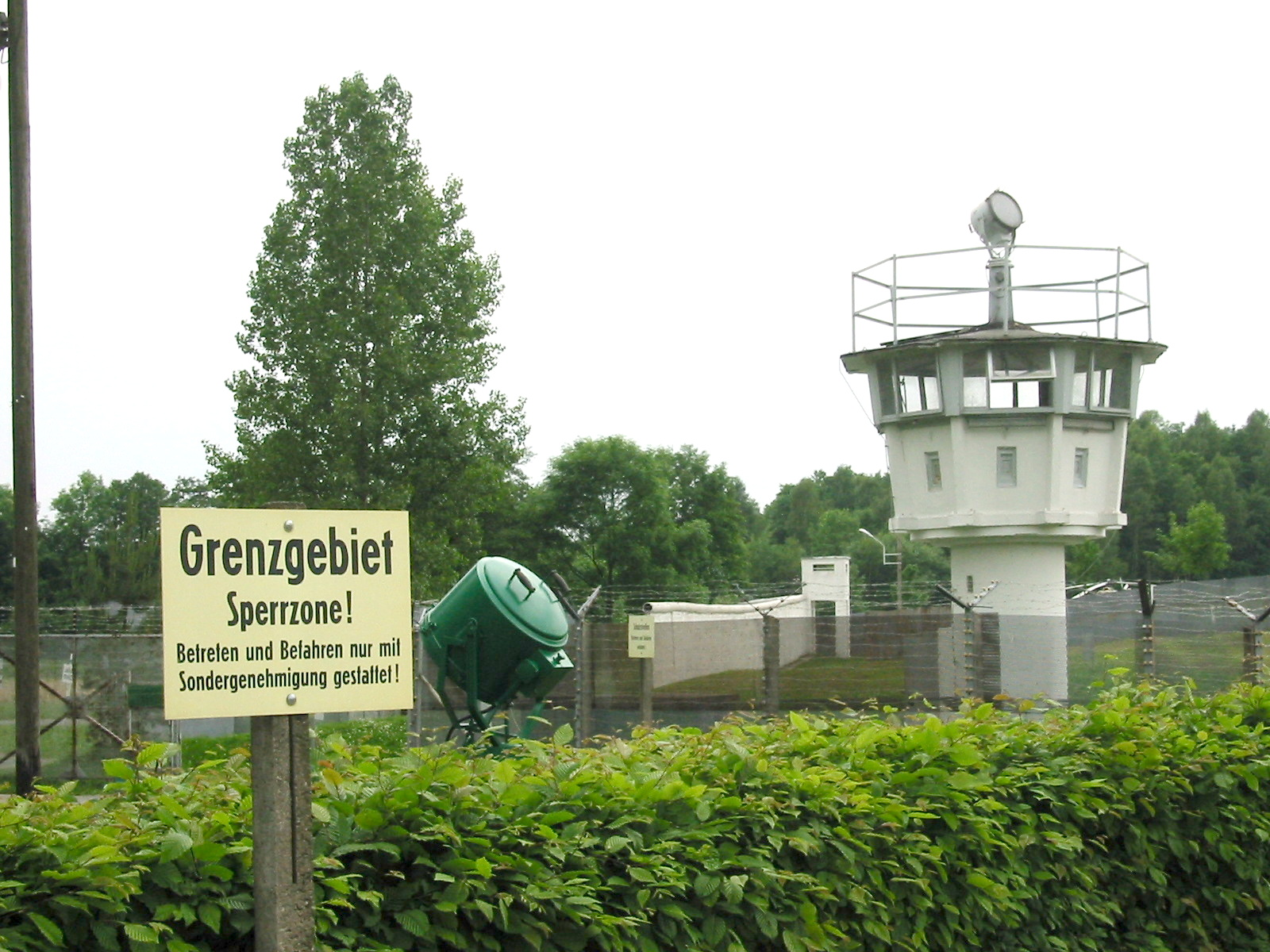
Border installations at the Deutsch-Deutsches Museum Mödlareuth

Name in German (with external links)	Location	Description
Grenzdokumentations-Stätte Lübeck-Schlutup	Schlutup, Lübeck, Schleswig-Holstein (map)	The Border Documentation Site of Lübeck-Schlutup is located in a former West German customs building in Schlutup, a suburb of Lübeck, near the site of the most northerly crossing point on the inner German border. The museum houses a display illustrating the inner German border in Schleswig-Holstein and the work of the West German Federal Border Guard in the region.
Grenzhus Schlagsdorf	Schlagsdorf, Mecklenburg-Vorpommern (map)	The Border House at Schlagsdorf presents an overview of the inner German border, focusing on the Schleswig-Holstein and Schaalsee region, with many original artefacts used by the East German border guards. The exhibition also documents the subsequent transformation of the border region into a haven for wildlife. An outdoor exhibition on the outskirts of the village preserves reconstructed and original elements of the border fortifications, including a watchtower, fences, control strip and replica SM-70 directional mines.
Priesterkate Büchen	Büchen, Schleswig-Holstein (map)	The historic Priest's Cottage in Büchen, dating from 1649, houses a permanent exhibition about the inner German border. It focuses in particular on the story of Michael Gartenschläger, a former East German political prisoner who was killed on a nearby stretch of the border in May 1976.
Elbbergmuseum Boizenburg	Boizenburg, Mecklenburg-Vorpommern (map)	The Elbbergmuseum on the outskirts of Boizenburg preserves the unique combination of part of a former GDR border crossing – now a diner called "Checkpoint Harry" – and a former kitchen building from a Nazi concentration camp that operated on the same site during the Second World War. An outdoor exhibition tells the story of the border crossing and the inner German border in the region.
Grenzlandmuseum Schnackenburg	Schnackenburg, Lower Saxony (map)	The Borderland Museum Schnackenburg, housed in a former fisherman's cottage on the west bank of the Elbe river, focuses on the stretch of the inner German border along the Elbe from Lauenburg to Schnackenburg. It presents exhibits including border control displays and an original GDR river patrol boat, as well as a display about the destroyed border villages in the region. The museum also presents a walking trail along the Elbe dyke to the razed village of Stresow, where there is a small reconstruction of the border fortifications.
Grenzlandmuseum Swinmark	Göhr, Lower Saxony (map)	The Borderland Museum Swinmark, located a few kilometres north of the former border in the village of Göhr, presents a small exhibition of artefacts from the period of the division of Germany and displays an outdoor reconstruction of some elements of the border fortifications.
Museum Burg Brome	Brome, Lower Saxony (map)	The Brome Castle Museum is located in a medieval fortress dating from the 11th/12th centuries. As well as a permanent exhibition about traditional local handcrafts, it documents the history of the inner German border, which surrounded Brome on three sides.
Landwirtschaftliches Museum Böckwitz	Böckwitz, Saxony-Anhalt (map)	The Agricultural Museum Böckwitz presents an exhibition of local agriculture and the inner German border in the region around the divided villages of Zicherie-Böckwitz. Two km south of the museum, a "Border instructional path" (Grenzlehrpfad) presents an outdoor exhibition of the development of the border installations, with a reconstruction of the various stages of the border fortifications from 1952 to the 1980s. There is also an original watchtower.
Zonengrenz-Museum	Helmstedt, Lower Saxony (map)	The Zonal Border Museum at Helmstedt documents the inner German border in Lower Saxony, with a particular focus on the main border crossing point on the Hamburg-Berlin autobahn a few kilometres east of Helmstedt. Among the exhibits is an original railway observation carriage used by the US Army during the Cold War to carry out intelligence-gathering when American military trains crossed the border en route to Berlin.
Gedenkstätte Deutsche Teilung Marienborn	Marienborn, Saxony-Anhalt (map)	The Memorial to German Division Marienborn is housed in the surviving buildings of the former East German crossing point at Marienborn, which was once the largest crossing point on the inner German border. As well as providing a permanent exhibition and study centre on the history of the border and the Marienborn crossing point, the museum shows, in the original buildings, how the GDR controlled travel in and out of the country and stopped escape attempts.
Grenzdenkmal Hötensleben	Hötensleben, Saxony-Anhalt (map)	The Border Memorial Hötensleben is one of only a handful places on the former inner German border where a large section of former border installations can still be seen in situ. The border wall, watchtowers, fences and other installations form an outdoor trail, marked with signs that explain each aspect of the border system.
Brocken Museum	Brocken, Saxony-Anhalt (map)	From 1961 to 1994, the peak of the Brocken was occupied by Soviet troops who built a large signals intelligence station eavesdropping on West Germany. The Brocken House, which was formerly a Soviet listening post, now houses an exhibition on the natural environment and history of the Brocken, including its time on the front line of the inner German border.
Freiland-Grenzmuseum Sorge	Sorge/Hohegeiß, Saxony-Anhalt (map)	The Sorge Border Museum (Grenzmuseum Sorge) preserves sections of the signal and border fences and an original watchtower on the former border near Sorge in the Harz mountains. A stretch of former border patrol road leads to the Ring of Remembrance (Ring der Erinnerung), a circular piece of landscape art 5 metres (16 ft) high and 70 metres (230 ft) around, created in 1993 by Hermann Prigann. Constructed from piled trunks and tree limbs, the ring surrounds nine remaining concrete fence-posts from the former border.
Grenzlandmuseum Bad Sachsa	Tettenborn, Lower Saxony (map)	The Borderland Museum Bad Sachsa, located in the village hall of Tettenborn, illustrates the layout and operation of the inner German border in the Bad Sachsa region. It includes a full-scale reconstruction of a GDR border command post with the original equipment and a working segment of the signal fence.
Borderland Museum Eichsfeld	Teistungen, Thuringia (map)	The Borderland Museum Eichsfeld deals with the German division and its effect on the Eichsfeld region. It is located in the buildings of a former border crossing point between Duderstadt and Teistungen. All the information in the museum is displayed in both German and English. A circular hiking trail leads along the former Iron Curtain and allows the visitors to view the original border facilities, for instance observation towers of the GDR border troops and the Bundesgrenzschutz. The museum also includes a study centre which offers various workshops for students.
Grenzmuseum Schifflersgrund	Schifflersgrund, Thuringia (map)	The Border Museum Schifflersgrund preserves around 1.5 kilometres (0.93 mi) of the fortifications along the former border. On a hill above Bad Sooden-Allendorf an original watchtower is at the centre of the museum's exhibits, which include historical displays and an extensive collection of East and West German military equipment which was used to guard the border.
Museum Burg Wendelstein	Vacha, Thuringia ("Burg+Wendelstein"/@50.8307999,10.0218777,16.5z/ map)	Wendelstein Castle in Vacha presents an exhibition of local history, one of the biggest collections of dolls in Thuringia and an exhibition of the inner German border in the Philippsthal/Vacha region. The town lay right on the border but was separated from West Germany by a wall that ran across the historic bridge across the Werra on the edge of the town.
Gedenkstätte Point Alpha	Geisa, Thuringia (map)	The Memorial Site Point Alpha preserves the US Army's former Observation Point Alpha and the corresponding East German border installations running a distance of several hundred metres and occupying an area of 70,000 square metres (750,000 sq ft). At Point Alpha, a permanent exhibition documents the US Army's 45-year watch on the inner German border in the original buildings of the facility, and the original watchtower provides a panoramic view into Thuringia. On the Thuringian side, a purpose-built museum documents the development and operation of the GDR's border regime.
Deutsch-deutsches Freilandmuseum Behrungen	Behrungen, Thuringia (map)	The German-German Outdoor Museum at Behrungen displays various preserved elements of the border installations, including a watchtower, fence, anti-vehicle barrier and bunker.
Museum für Grenzgänger	Bad Königshofen, Bavaria (map)	The Museum for Border-Crossers, co-located with the archaeological museum in Bad Königshofen, presents an exhibition of the personal lives of those crossing the border between Thuringia and Bavaria in the Grabfeld region, before and during the period of German division. An outdoor exhibit shows a reconstruction of elements of the border installations.
Gedenkstätte Heinersdorf-Welitsch	Heinersdorf, Thuringia	The Memorial Heinersdorf-Welitsch preserves a section of the border fortifications that formerly divided the villages of Heinersdorf and Welitsch. They include a section of the former border wall, 30 metres (98 ft) long (originally 750 metres (2,460 ft) long), an anti-vehicle ditch, control strip, watchtower and water barrier. An exhibition is housed in an original wooden barracks at the former border crossing point between Heinersdorf and Welitsch.
Deutsch-Deutsches Museum Mödlareuth	Mödlareuth, Bavaria/Thuringia (map)	The German-German Museum Mödlareuth preserves the longest stretch of border wall still present on the former border, 700 metres (2,300 ft) long) and 3.3 metres (11 ft) long), along with two observation towers, border columns and warning signs, floodlights and other relics of the division of the village. The preserved border installations lie along a 4 kilometres (2.5 mi) long) instructional path. A museum in the village tells the story of the border and the division of Germany.
