= Fletcher E. Adams =

WWII Ace Fighter Pilot

Captain Fletcher E. Adams
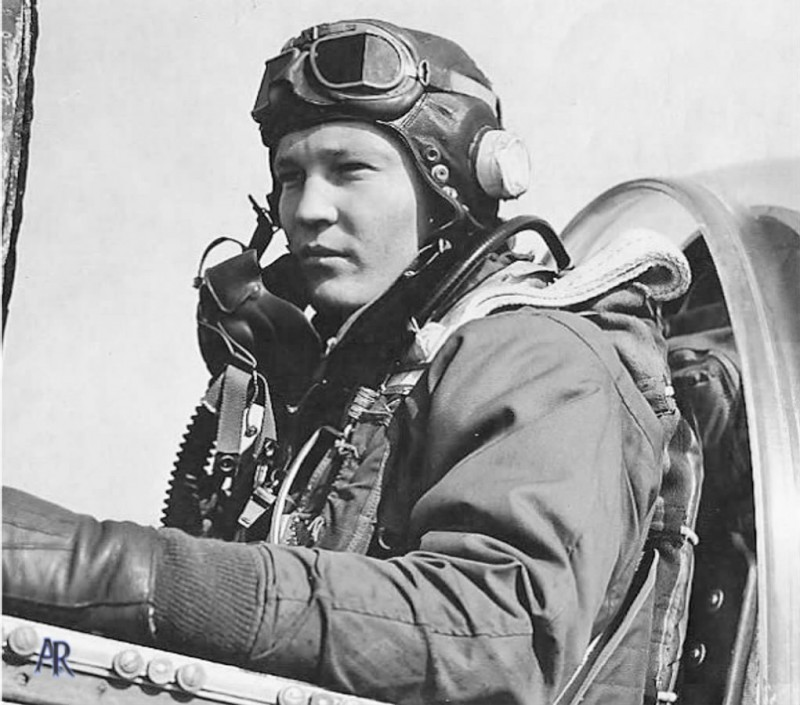
- Fletcher Adams
- Born: Fletcher Eugene Adams; August 2, 1921; Homer, Louisiana, U.S.
- Died: May 30, 1944 (aged 22); Tiddische, Nazi Germany
- Burial place: Bethesaida Cemetery, Ida, Louisiana
- Spouse: Mary (nee) Aline Adams
- Military career
- Allegiance: United States
- Branch: U.S. Army Air Force
- Rank: Captain
- Nickname: Fletch
- Unit: 362d Fighter Squadron
- Awards: Congressional Gold Medal; Purple Heart

Fletcher Eugene Adams (August 2, 1921 – May 30, 1944) was a U.S. Army Air Forces World War II flying ace who shot down nine enemy aircraft in the European theatre of World War II. Adams was murdered after being shot down.

== Early life ==
He was married to Mary (nee) Aline and they had a son in 1944 who they named Jerry.

== Career ==
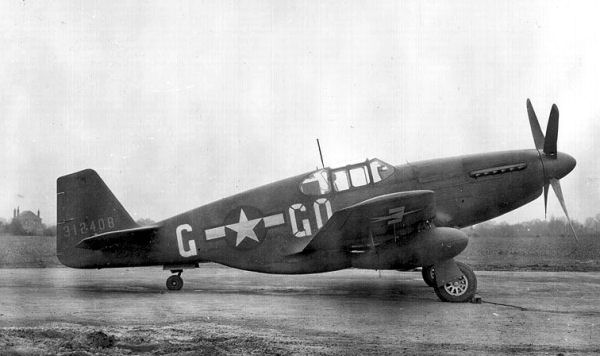
Photo of a WWII P-51. Adams flew a P-51B and he named the aircraft "Southern Belle".

By 1944 Adams had shot down 7 enemy aircraft.

But on May 30, 1944, Adams P-51B was attacked and shot down by 4 Bf-109s near Celle Air Base: he parachuted out of his aircraft and landed on the ground. Civilians on the ground killed him. His fate was not known until after the war. After Adams surrendered to 3 Wehrmacht soldiers in Tiddische, Germany, two German nationals approached and took custody of him. Three men then took Adams into the woods and shot him several times. Witnesses saw the men standing over Adams' dead body after hearing gunshots. After the war, two of the men, Gustav Heidmann and Erich Schnelle, were prosecuted for their roles in the murder of Adams. Heidmann was sentenced to death, while Schnelle was sentenced to 20 years in prison. However, Heidmann's sentence was reduced to life in prison, then to 20 years. He was paroled in 1954. Schnelle was released in 1950.

== Awards ==
- Congressional Gold Medal (2015)
- Distinguished Flying Cross (Note: His flying Cross citation was given for his aerial combat while part of the 362d Fighter Squadron. During WWII he displayed skill and zeal in destroying the enemy.)

== See also ==
- List of World War II aces from the United States
- List of World War II flying aces
