= Bergfeld =

- Municipality
- Coat of arms

- Location of Bergfeld within Gifhorn district
- Interactive map of Bergfeld
- Location within Germany Location within Lower Saxony
- Coordinates: 52°33′N 10°51′E
- Country: Germany
- State: Lower Saxony
- District: Gifhorn
- Municipal assoc.: Brome

Government
  - Mayor: Ute Düsterhöft (CDU)

Area
  - Total: 10.6 km^{2} (4.1 sq mi)
- Elevation: 64 m (210 ft)

Population (2025-12-31)
  - Total: 873
  - Density: 82.4/km^{2} (213/sq mi)
- Time zone: UTC+01:00 (CET)
  - Summer (DST): UTC+02:00 (CEST)
- Postal codes: 38467
- Dialling codes: 05368
- Vehicle registration: GF

Bergfeld is a municipality in the district of Gifhorn, in Lower Saxony, Germany.

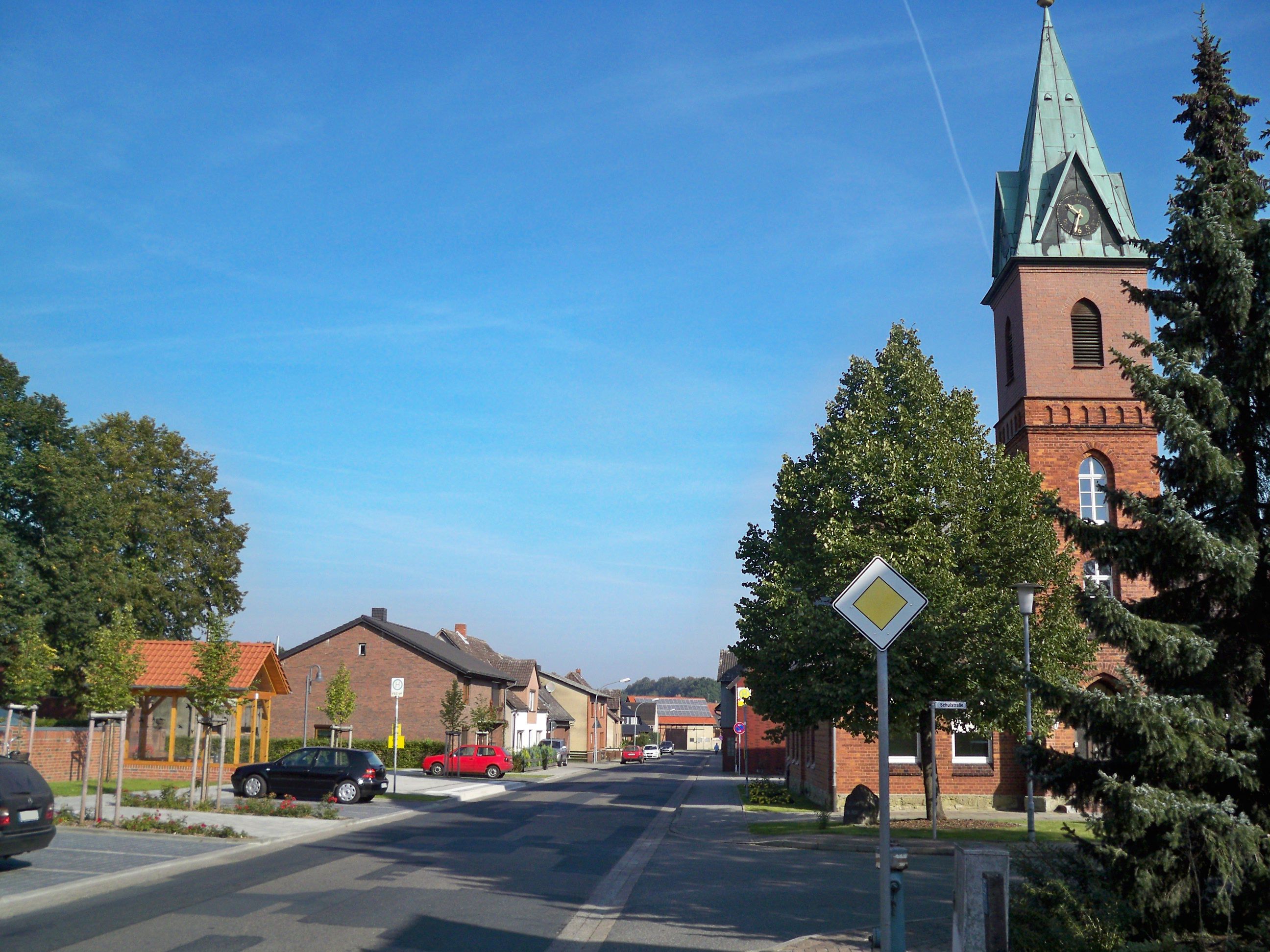
Main street
