= Tülau =

- Municipality
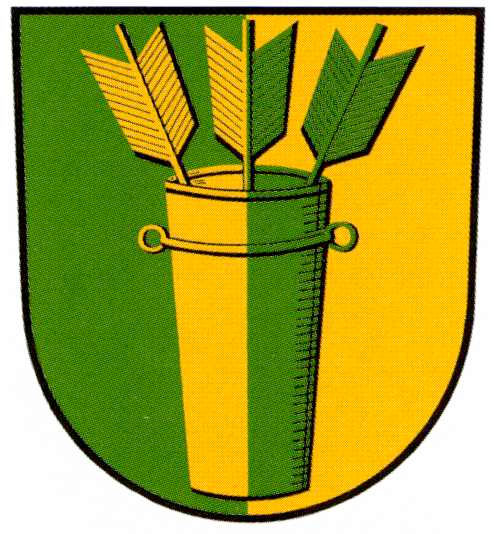
- Coat of arms

- Location of Tülau within Gifhorn district
- Interactive map of Tülau
- Location within Germany Location within Lower Saxony
- Coordinates: 52°35′N 10°52′E
- Country: Germany
- State: Lower Saxony
- District: Gifhorn
- Municipal assoc.: Brome
- Subdivisions: 2

Government
  - Mayor: Martin Zenk (SPD)

Area
  - Total: 23.53 km^{2} (9.08 sq mi)
- Elevation: 72 m (236 ft)

Population (2025-12-31)
  - Total: 1,482
  - Density: 62.98/km^{2} (163.1/sq mi)
- Time zone: UTC+01:00 (CET)
  - Summer (DST): UTC+02:00 (CEST)
- Postal codes: 38474
- Dialling codes: 05833
- Vehicle registration: GF

Tülau is a municipality in the district of Gifhorn, in Lower Saxony, Germany. The Municipality Tülau includes the villages of Tülau-Fahrenhorst and Voitze.

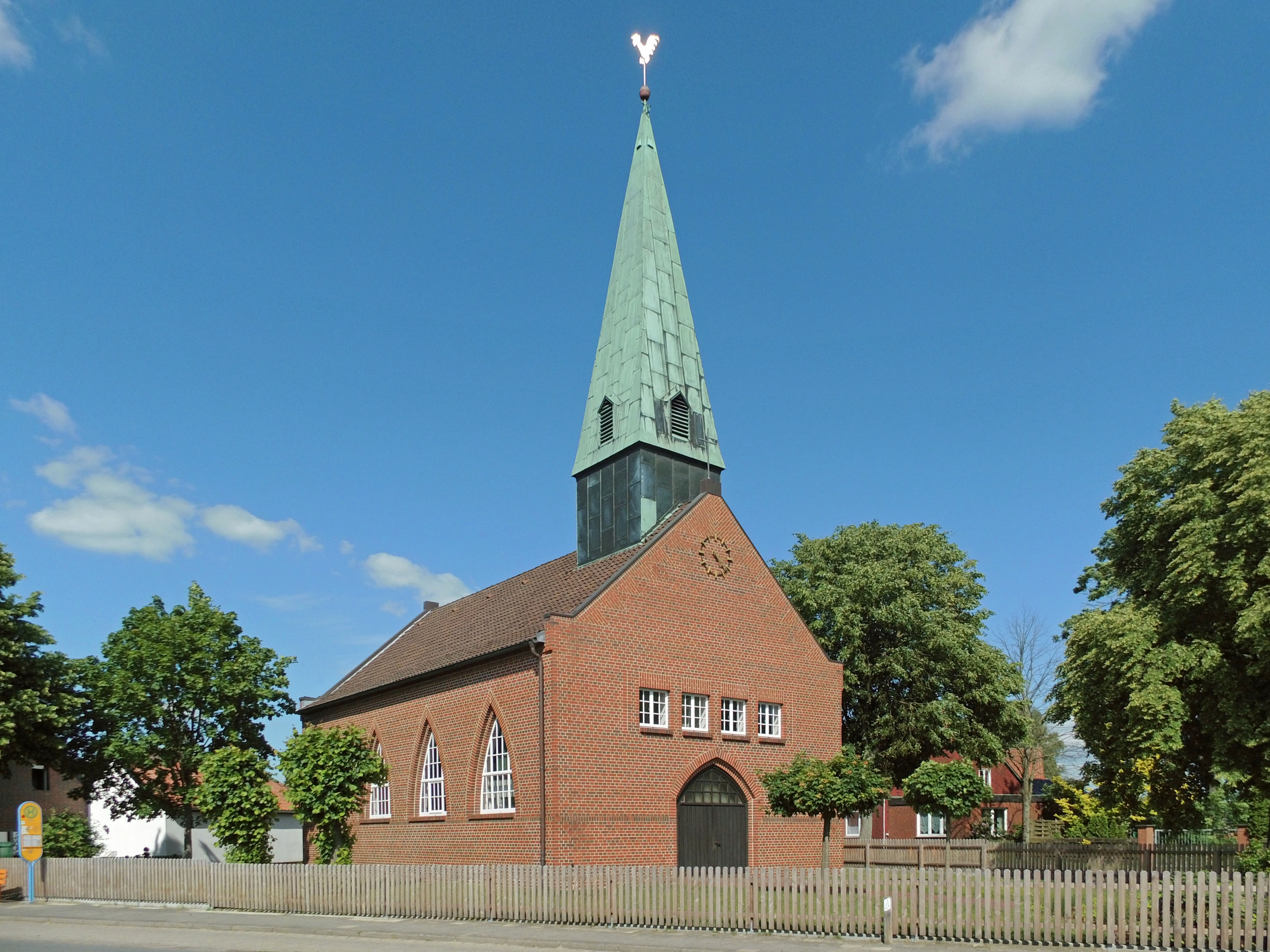
The Lutheran church in Tülau
