= Brocken House =

- Brockenhaus (German)
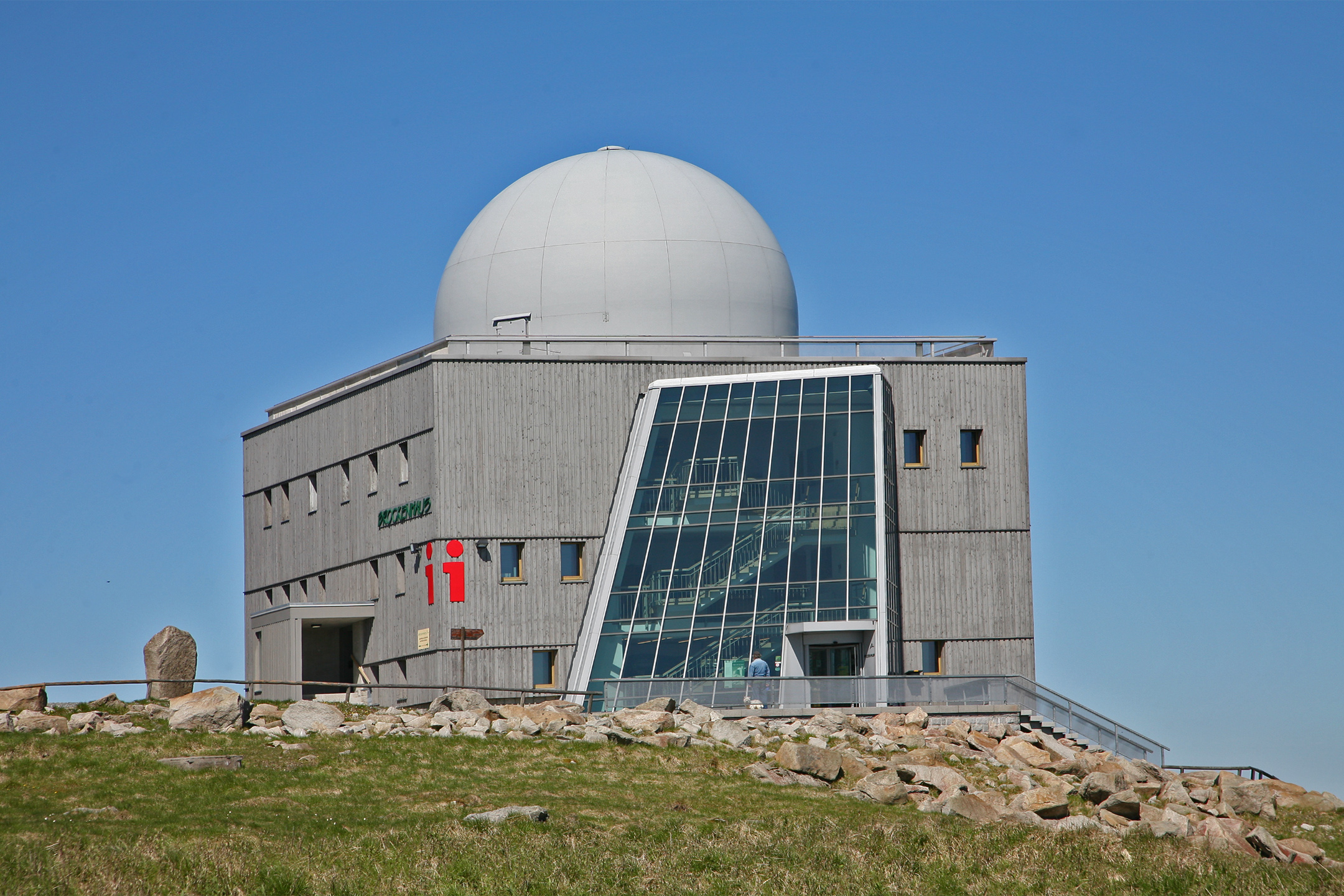
- The Brocken House on Mount Brocken (2010)
- Interactive map of the Brocken House area

General information
- Architectural style: Modern architecture
- Location: Wernigerode, Germany
- Current tenants: Brocken Museum and Harz National Park visitor centre
- Construction started: 1983 (Spy listening station)
- Inaugurated: 1986, redesign 1998-2000

Design and construction
- Architect: Wolf-Rüdiger Eisentraut (redesign)

Other information
- Public transit: Brocken station of the Brocken Railway
- Brocken Museum
- Brockenmuseum (German)
- Established: 1 June 1991
- Coordinates: 51.800472°N 10.615748°E
- Website: www.brockenhaus-harz.de, in German

The Brocken House (Brockenhaus (German)) is a building on the summit of the Mount Brocken in the Harz Mountains in Saxony-Anhalt, Germany. It serves as a visitor center of the Harz National Park and museum.

== Description ==
The Brocken House has the shape of a cube topped by a distinctive white dome, which recalls the building's original function as a spy listening station built by the GDR Ministry for State Security. This feature led to the building being colloquially referred to as the "Brocken Mosque" or "Stasi Mosque". Another architectural feature is the glass facade on one side, which spans all three floors and measures 115 square metres (1,240 sq ft). The design of this distinctive front, which was the result of an architectural competition in the 1990s, comes from Wolf Rüdiger Eisentraut, the architect of the Palace of the Republic in Berlin. The exterior walls of the Brocken House were covered with a wooden facade in 2018, and the glass front was renewed in 2024. Each of the panes weighing around 128 kilograms (282 lb) was individually measured and manufactured, as the window surfaces have neither right angles nor standardised sizes. The building is integrated into the summit development.

== History ==
=== Building ===
The groundbreaking ceremony for the house took place in 1983. The espionage activity in the house was finished by the Peaceful Revolution in 1989. In 1991, the Brocken House transferred for use by the Harz National Park. In 1994, the state of Saxony-Anhalt bought the building from the Federal Republic of Germany. After the government of Saxony-Anhalt in Magdeburg had already announced the conversion of the mosque in 1993, the work finally began in 1998. With the renovation of the Brocken House and the installation of the staircase with the glass front, the Brocken House was stripped of its military character. After that, work began on setting up the exhibition. After several delays, the Brocken House opened in 2000.

In addition to exhibition rooms, accommodation for national park rangers and mountain rescue services as well as a small café have also been set up. The dome on the roof was also open to the public after the renovation.

=== Museum ===
The Brocken Museum, created in 1991 as part of the Wernigerode Harz Museum and housed by a disused radar station, quickly developed into a visitor magnet. Around 125,000 people a year (1997) viewed the small exhibition. In the harsh Brocken climate, the service in the museum was highly uncomfortable, because the dome made of fiberglass and plastic could not be heated and was also not insulated. From 1 June 1991, the museum presented interesting facts about the Brocken nature and the old border fortifications on display boards in the old dome, as well as marvel at the oldest piece of rail on the Brocken railway and original listening technology.

On 1 June 1993, the Brocken Museum then moved into the mosque which now belonged to the state of Saxony-Anhalt. Museum director Gerd Borchert and his staff set up the exhibition on one floor of the three-storey domed building. It provided even more comprehensive information about the history of the mountain, the mysticism surrounding witches and devils as well as the development of the National Park, including several models of the development of the mount Brocken.

== Exhibition ==
Over the years, the exhibition has been redesigned and expanded on three floors. On 30 June 2018, a new part of the permanent exhibition was ceremoniously inaugurated. It deals thematically with the division of Germany and the secret service past of the former Stasi listening centre "Urian" on the Brocken. Part of this exhibition is also the dome, which has been extensively repaired and is accessible to visitors via a spiral staircase. It houses historical listening systems, multimedia installations and eyewitness accounts.

In 2019, the first floor has been redesigned with the new exhibition section "Natura 2000/Harz National Park". The experience-centred exhibition concept uses staged rooms and sophisticated scenographies to enable visitors to immerse themselves intensively in the topics on offer.

== Management ==
The Brocken House is operated by the Brockenhaus GmbH. The state of Saxony-Anhalt holds 64 % of the shares, the city of Wernigerode 36 %.

== Various ==
The Brocken House is also a checkpoint on the Harzer Wandernadel hiking network (stamping point #9).

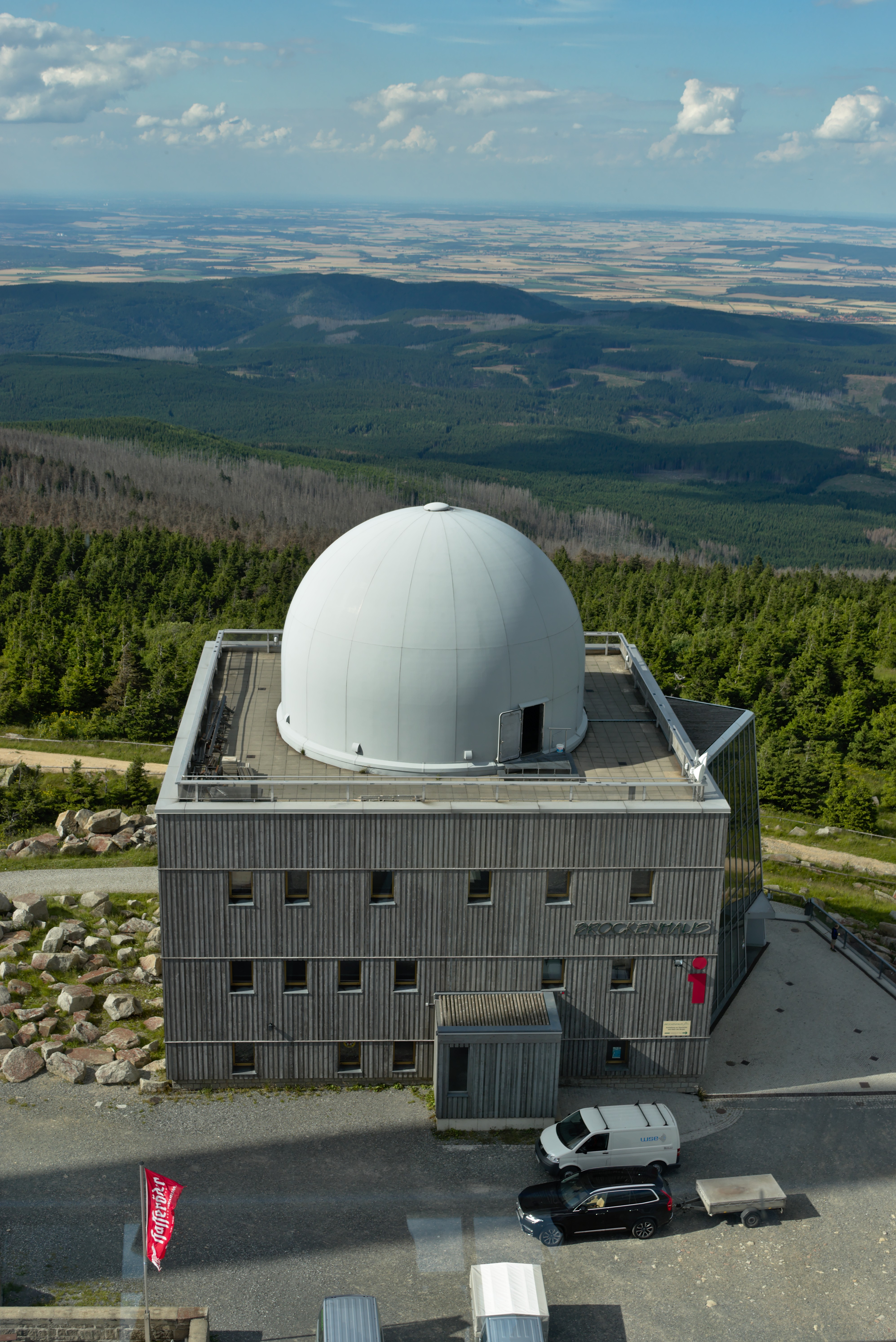
The Brocken House seen from the viewing platform of the adjacent Brocken Hotel (2016)

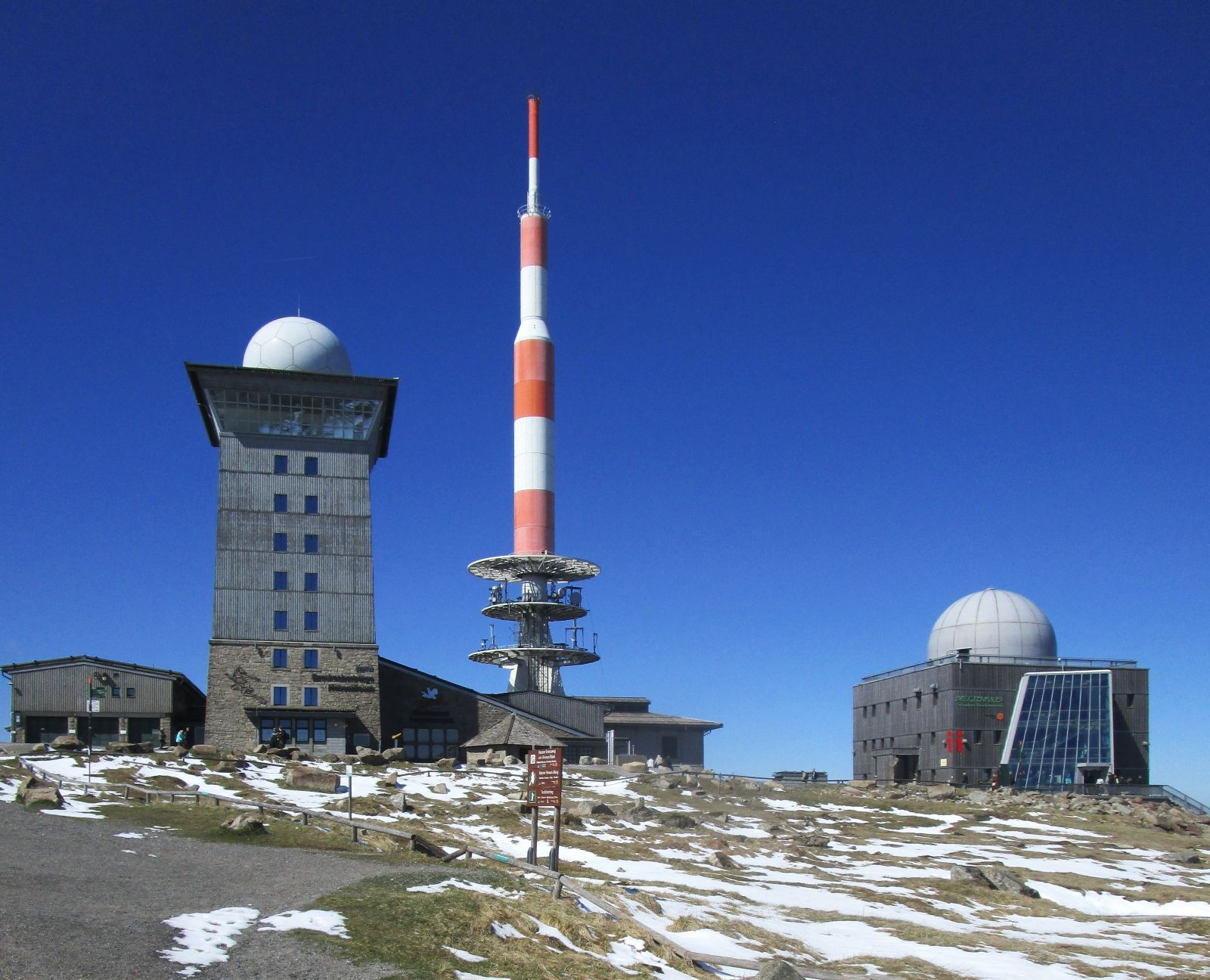
Development on the Brocken summit, the Brocken House is on the right (2026)

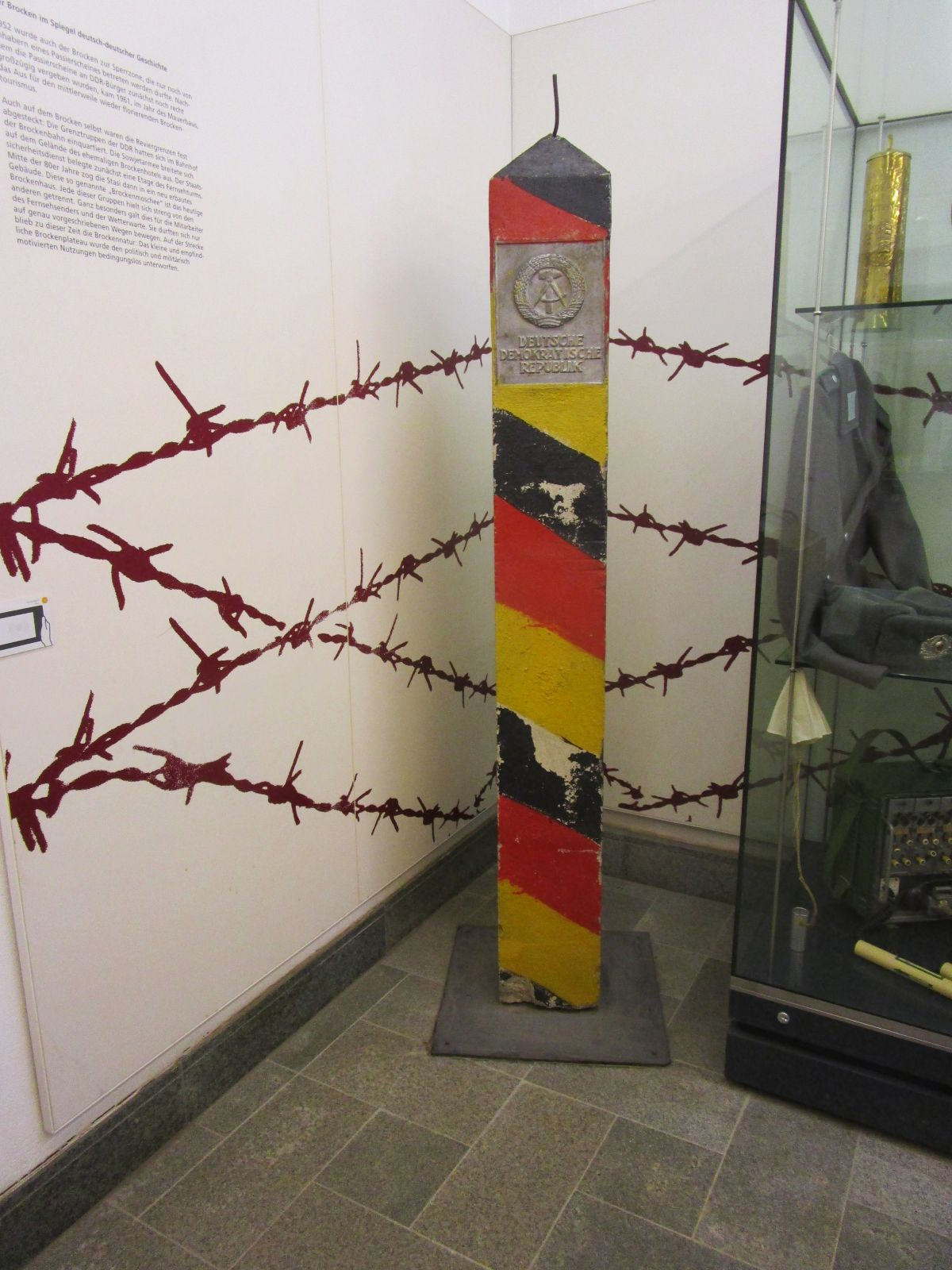
Inside the Brocken museum (2026)

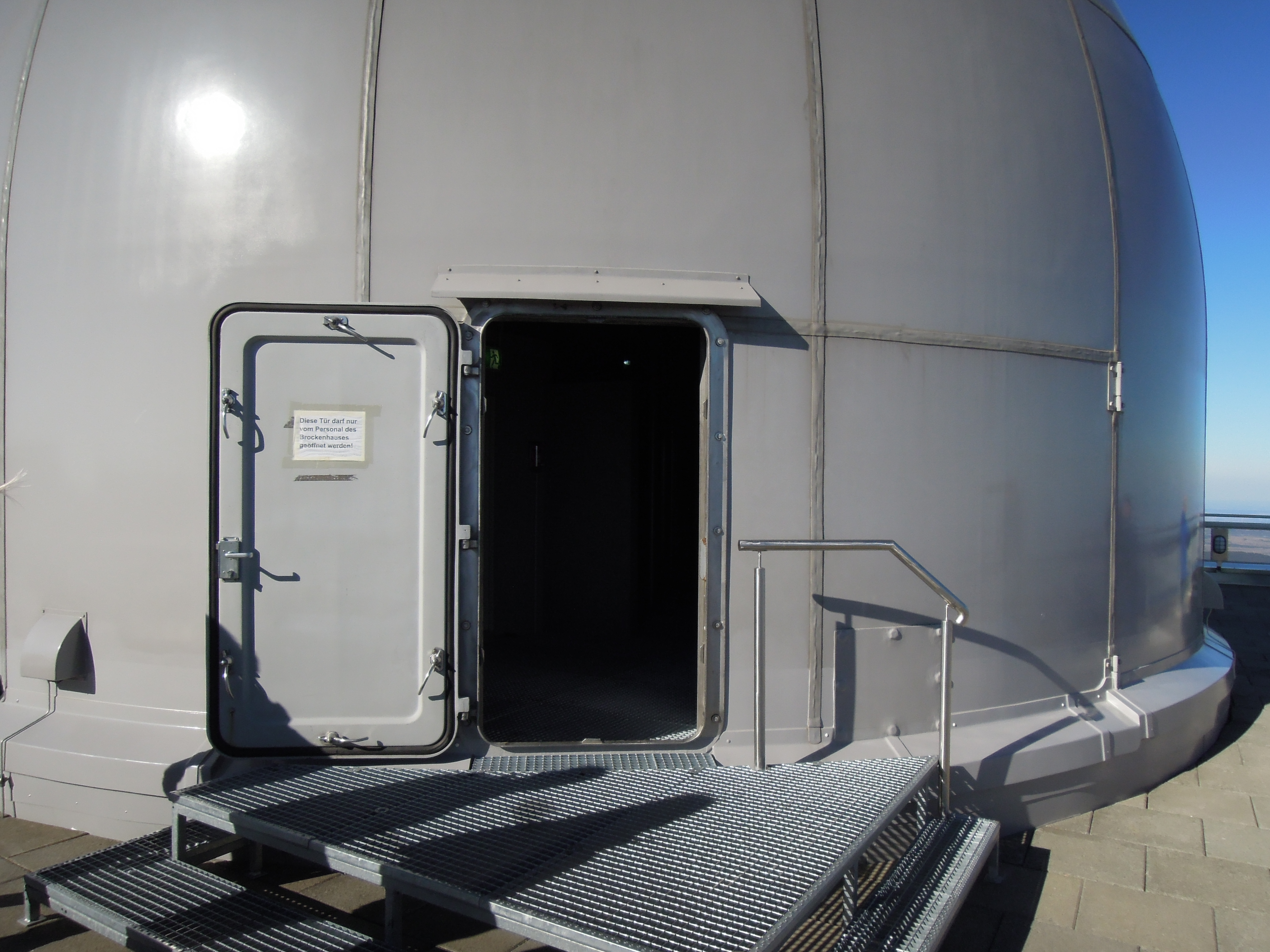
The opening of the Brocken House dome towards the viewing platform (2018)
