= Brome, Germany =

Brome
- Municipality
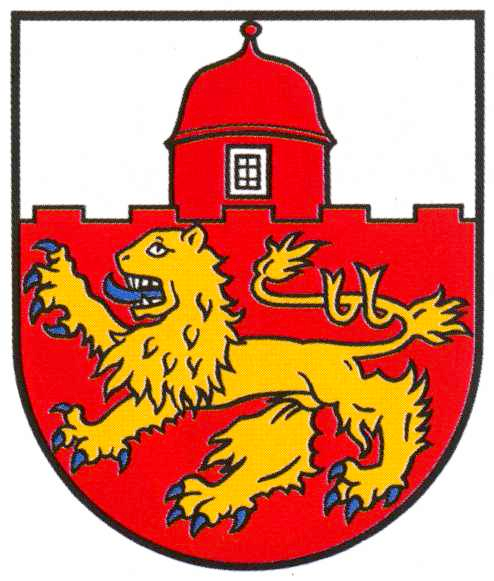
- Coat of arms

- Location of Brome within Gifhorn district
- Interactive map of Brome
- Location within Germany Location within Lower Saxony
- Coordinates: 52°36′N 10°57′E
- Country: Germany
- State: Lower Saxony
- District: Gifhorn
- Municipal assoc.: Brome
- Subdivisions: 5 Ortsteile

Government
  - Mayor: Gerhard Borchert (CDU)

Area
  - Total: 36.83 km^{2} (14.22 sq mi)
- Elevation: 66 m (217 ft)

Population (2025-12-31)
  - Total: 3,095
  - Density: 84.03/km^{2} (217.6/sq mi)
- Time zone: UTC+01:00 (CET)
  - Summer (DST): UTC+02:00 (CEST)
- Postal codes: 38465
- Dialling codes: 05833
- Vehicle registration: GF
- Website: www.brome.de

Brome (German pronunciation: [ˈbʁoːmə]) is a municipality in the district of Gifhorn, in Lower Saxony, Germany. It is situated on the river Ohre, approx. 25 km northeast of Wolfsburg.

The municipality consists of the following villages:

- Altendorf
- Benitz
- Brome
- Wiswedel
- Zicherie

Brome is also the seat of the Samtgemeinde Brome ("collective municipality").

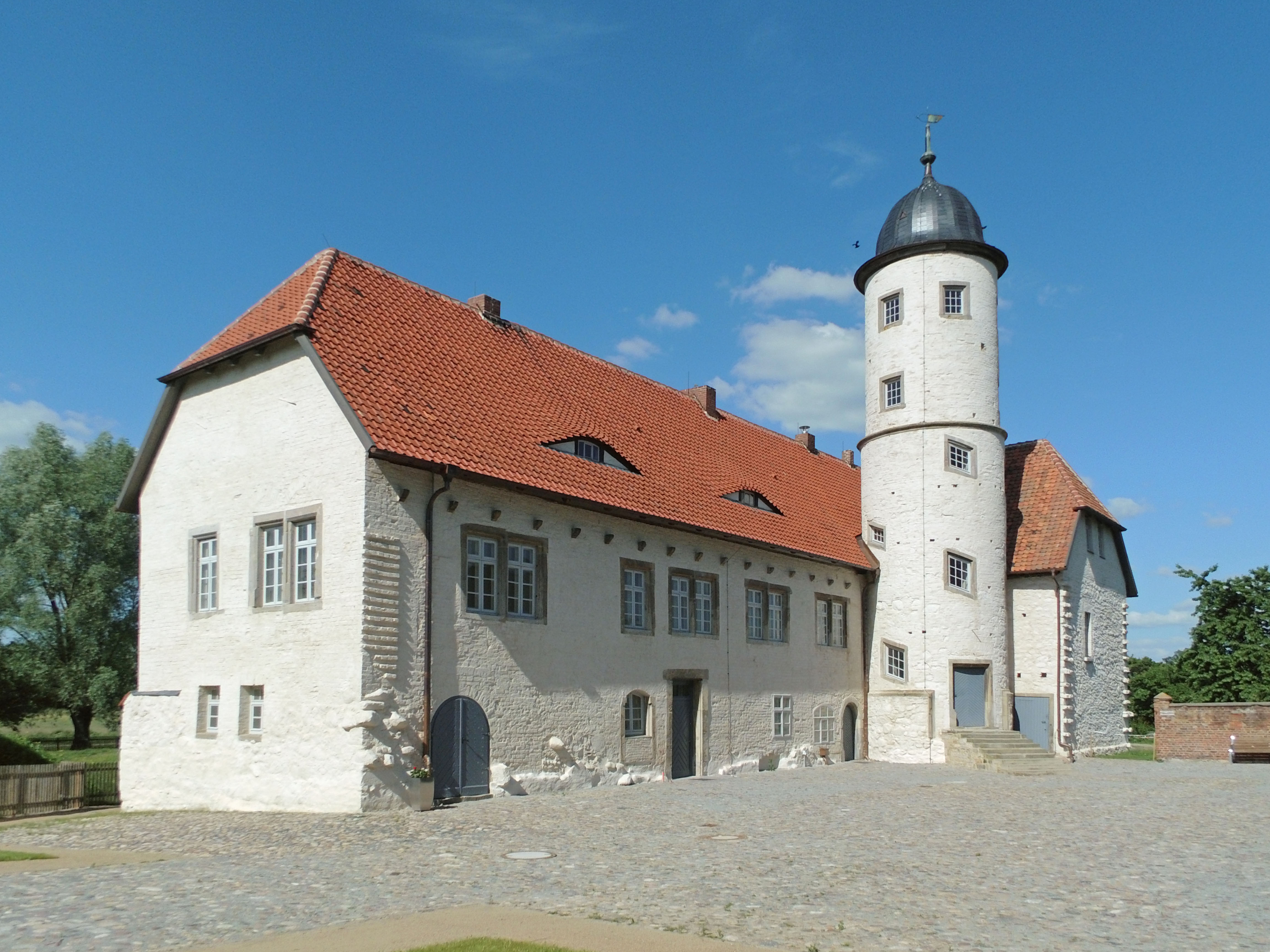
Castle

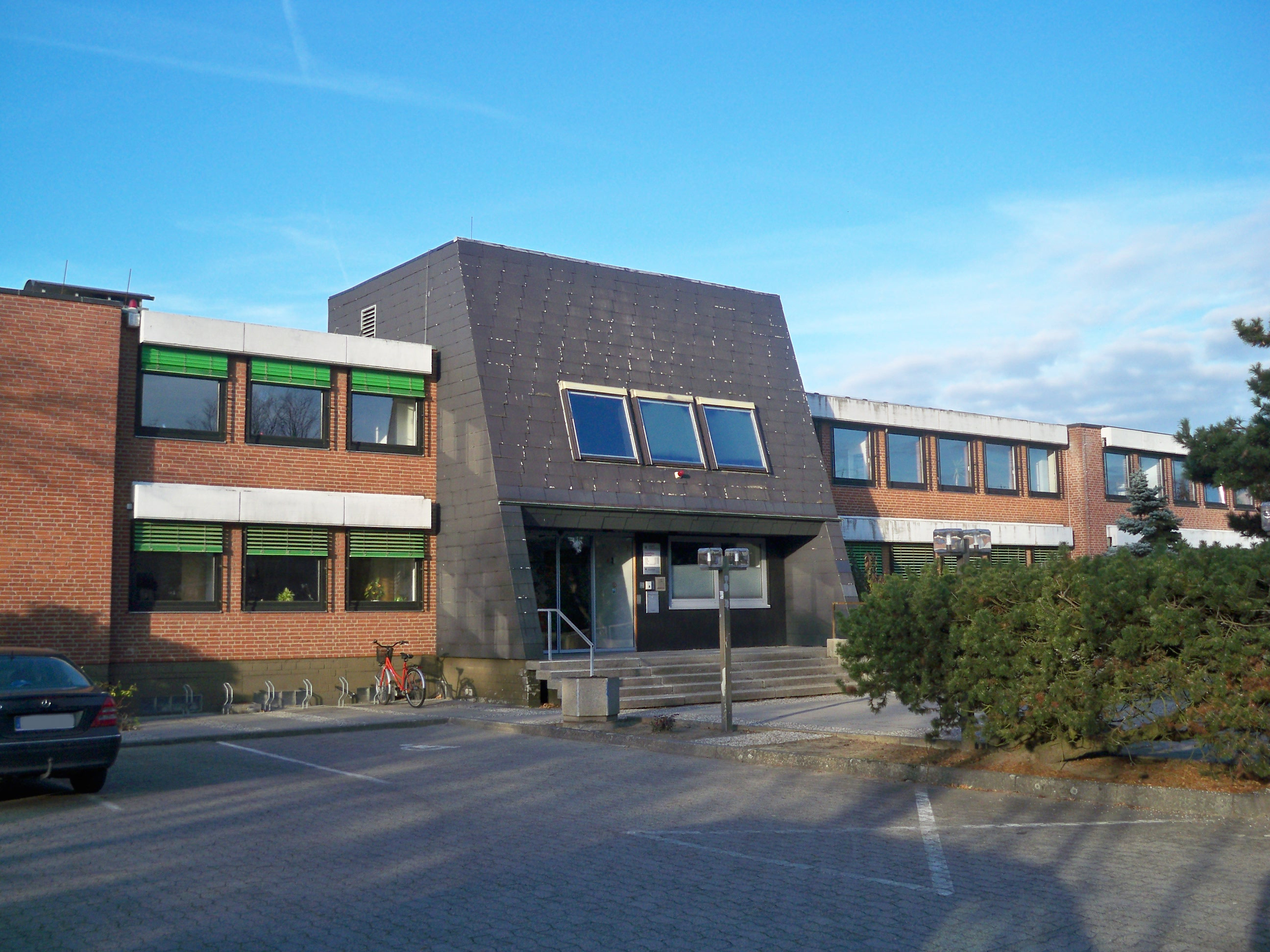
Town hall

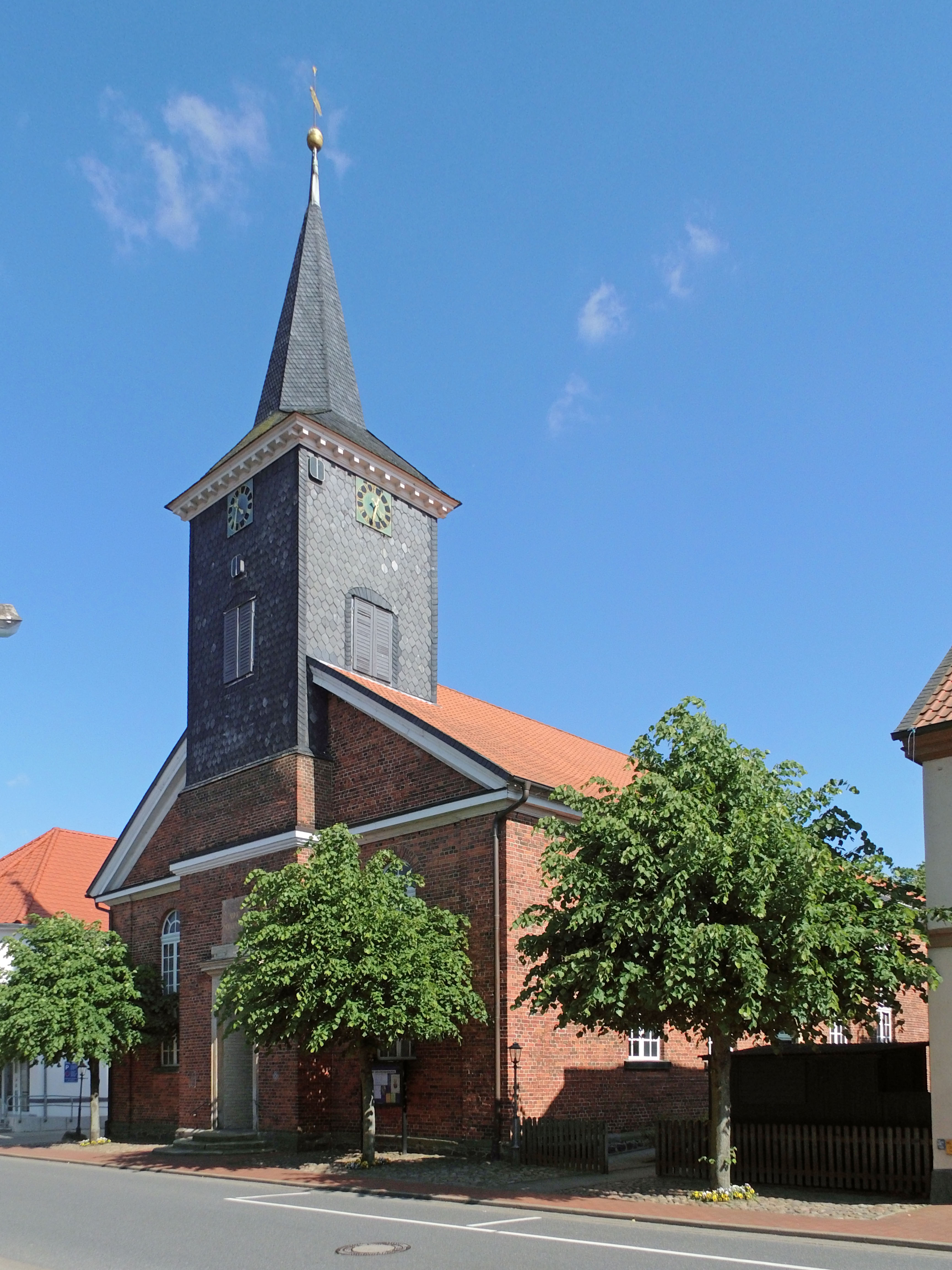
Lutheran church

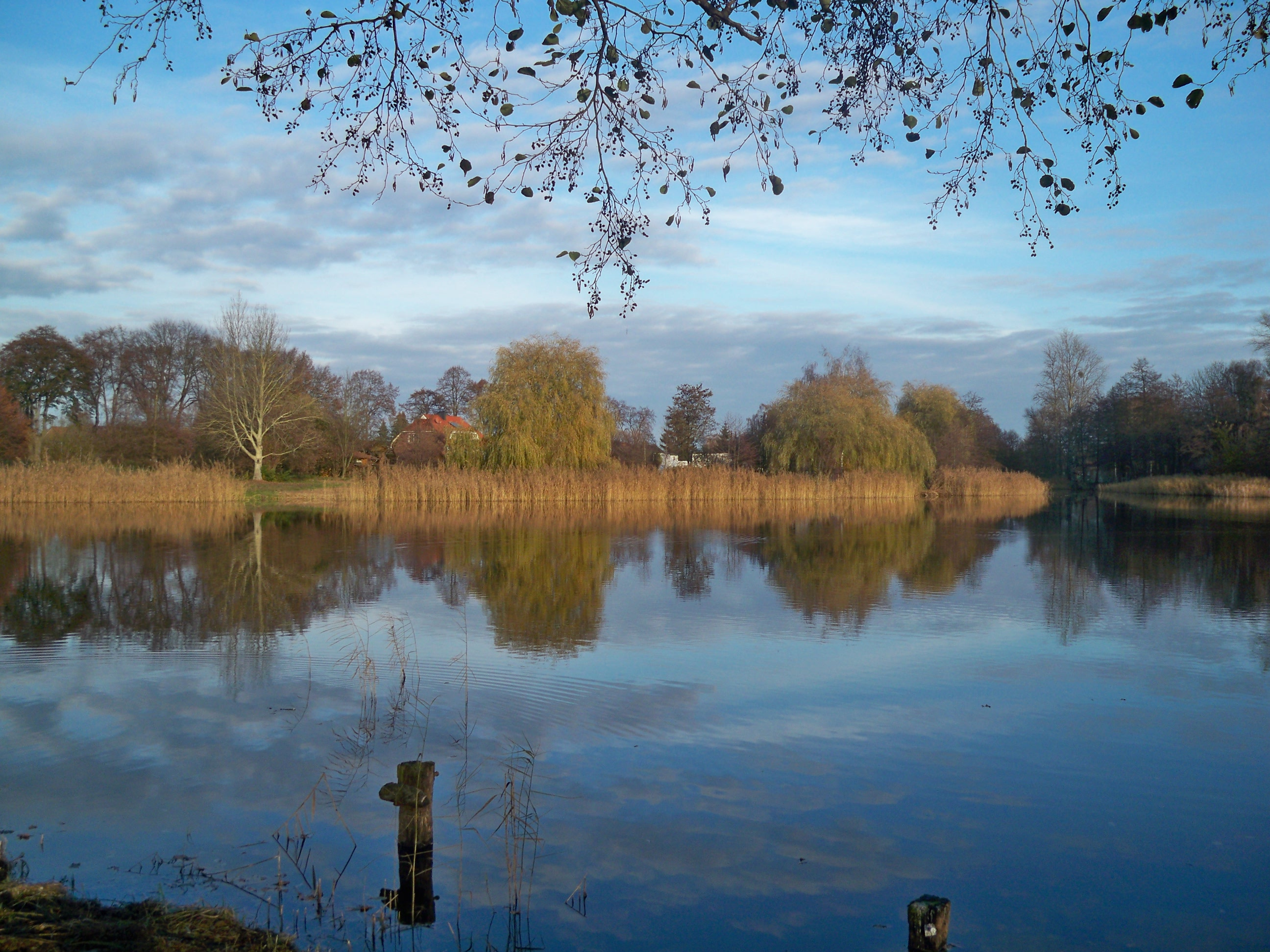
Lake Ohresee

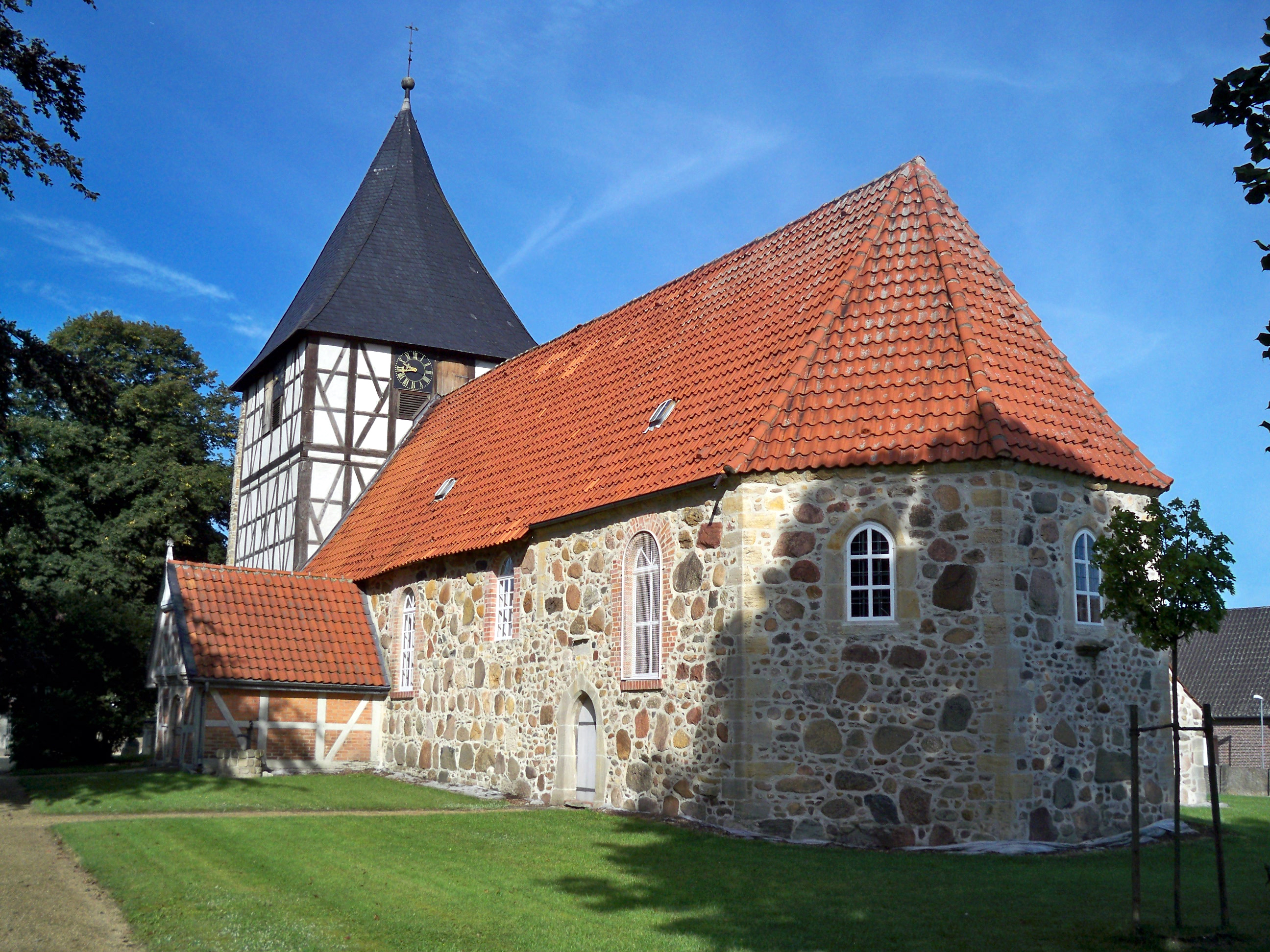
Lutheran church in Altendorf

During the Cold War, Brome was by the Inner German border separating West Germany and Communist East Germany (German Democratic Republic). The Brome Castle Museum has local artifacts from the Cold War and from other periods of history.
