= Ehra-Lessien =

- Municipality
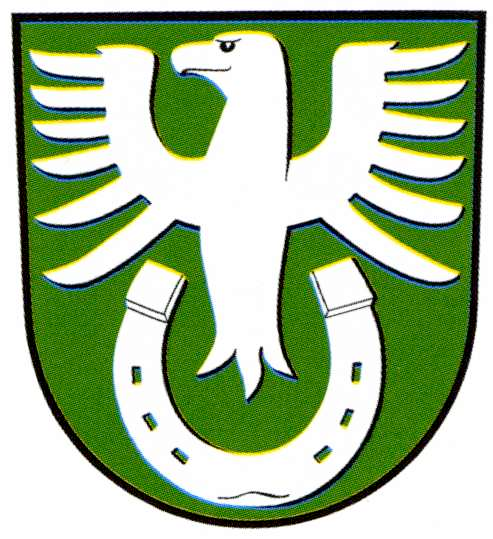
- Coat of arms

- Location of Ehra-Lessien within Gifhorn district
- Interactive map of Ehra-Lessien
- Location within Germany Location within Lower Saxony
- Coordinates: 52°35′49″N 10°47′46″E
- Country: Germany
- State: Lower Saxony
- District: Gifhorn
- Municipal assoc.: Brome
- Subdivisions: 2 Ortsteile

Government
  - Mayor: Jörg Böse (CDU)

Area
  - Total: 56.08 km^{2} (21.65 sq mi)
- Elevation: 63 m (207 ft)

Population (2025-12-31)
  - Total: 1,666
  - Density: 29.71/km^{2} (76.94/sq mi)
- Time zone: UTC+01:00 (CET)
  - Summer (DST): UTC+02:00 (CEST)
- Postal codes: 38468
- Dialling codes: 05377
- Vehicle registration: GF
- Website: www.ehra-lessien.de

Ehra-Lessien is a municipality in the district of Gifhorn, in Lower Saxony, Germany. The Municipality Ehra-Lessien includes the villages of Ehra and Lessien.

== Volkswagen Group test track ==
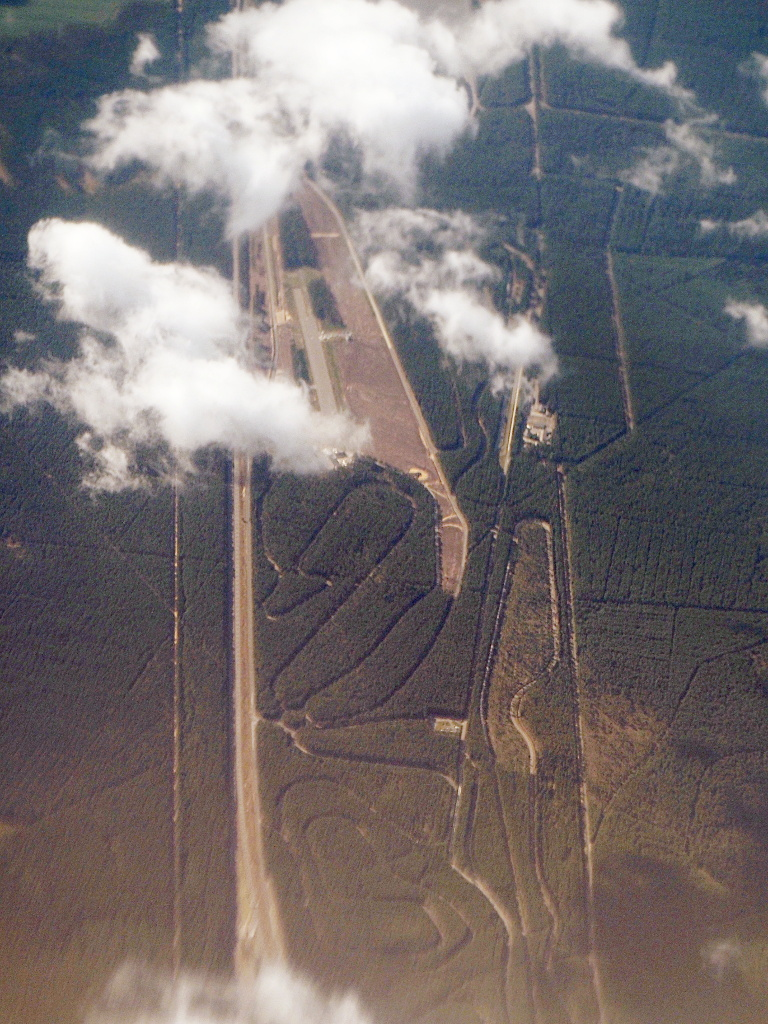
Volkswagen test range Ehra-Lessien (Air photo)

Volkswagen Group owns a test track facility in Ehra-Lessien, some 18 km (11 mi) north of its Wolfsburg factory. The facility was built during the Cold War. The location was chosen because, at the time, it was in a no-fly zone only 10 km (6.2 mi) west of the border between East Germany and West Germany, and thus secret prototypes could be tested out of sight of potential rivals.

The track is currently used by all Volkswagen Group subsidiaries and marques, such as Audi, Lamborghini, Bentley, SEAT, Škoda, and Porsche.

The facility features 96 km (60 mi) of private tarmac, which includes a large variety of road surfaces and curves, used as test tracks to evaluate new and prototype vehicles. Most notably, it includes a high speed circuit with a straight approximately 8.7 km (5.4 mi) long. Although the straight portion of the track is perfectly flat and level for the entire length, when standing at one end of the straight one cannot see the far end due to the curvature of the Earth. Banked corners at both ends of the circuit allow for a high entry and exit speed to and from the straight, and to increase average speed during the 20 km (12 mi) lap. The straight is especially useful for determining vehicle top speed, and is one of the few places on Earth that the Bugatti Veyron or the McLaren F1 can reach their top speeds.

Notably, the top speeds of the Veyron and the McLaren F1 were recorded along this straight. In Episode 2 of Season 9, aired on 4 February 2007 on BBC Two's Top Gear, presenter James May reached 407.5 km/h (253.2 mph) in a Bugatti Veyron thus breaking the world land speed record for a road legal vehicle. On 26 June 2010 May broke his own record in a Bugatti Veyron Super Sport with 1,200 bhp (890 kW), reached 417.9 km/h (259.7 mph) However shortly after this, the record was broken by Bugatti test driver Pierre Henri Raphanel, who recorded a speed of 431.072 km/h (267.856 mph) (Top Gear Episode 5, Season 15). The facility also appeared on National Geographic Channel's Man-Made, in episodes about the Bugatti Veyron and Chiron.

On 2 August 2019, Bugatti used a specially modified Chiron and broke the record again, reaching 490.48 km/h (304.77 mph). The top speed was set by Andy Wallace and verified by the TÜV (Germany's Technical Inspection Association). The event was recorded with multiple video cameras. Reportedly, Bugatti had spent the prior twelve months preparing for this new high speed record run.

== Gallery ==
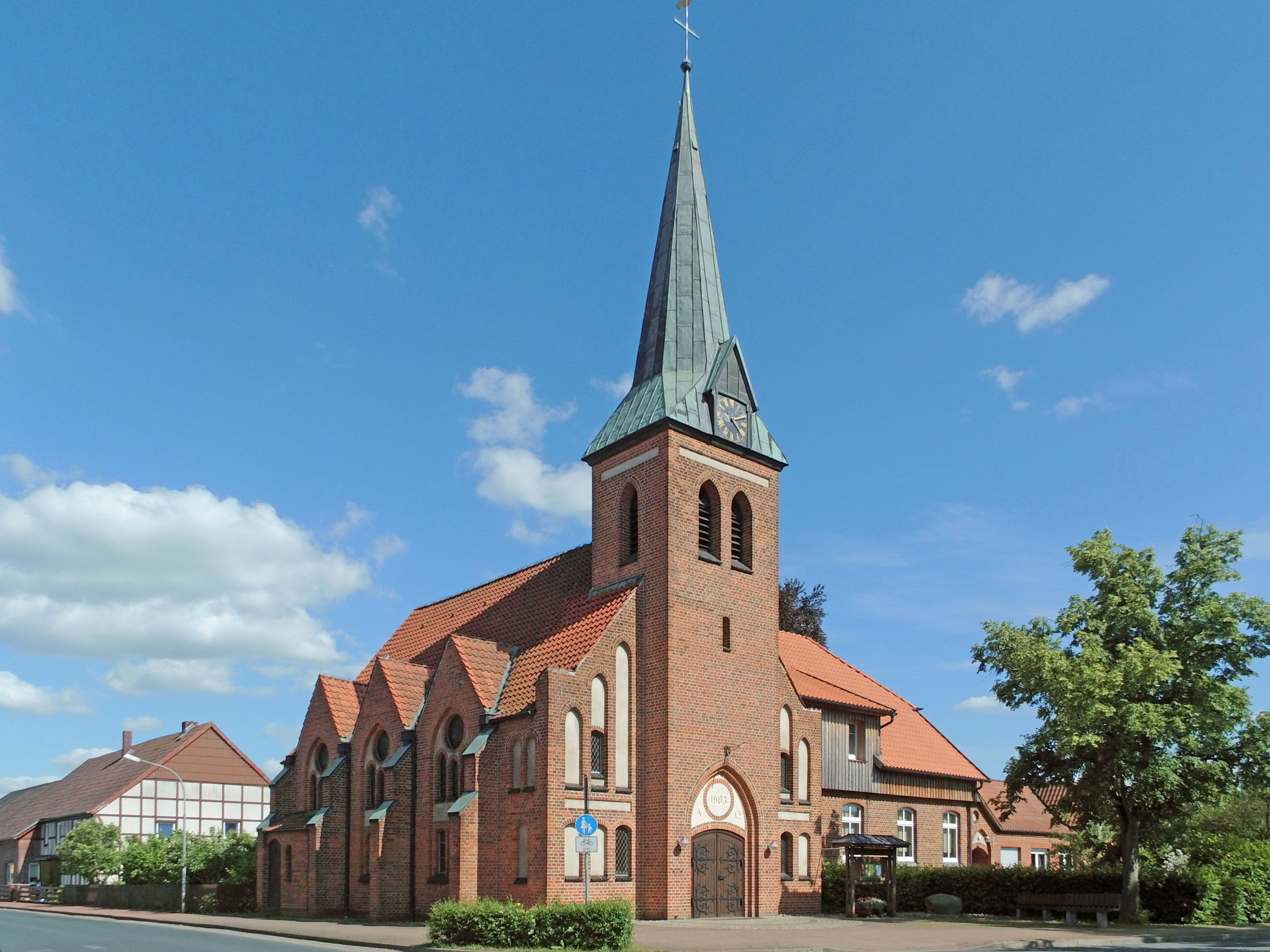
The Lutheran church in Ehra

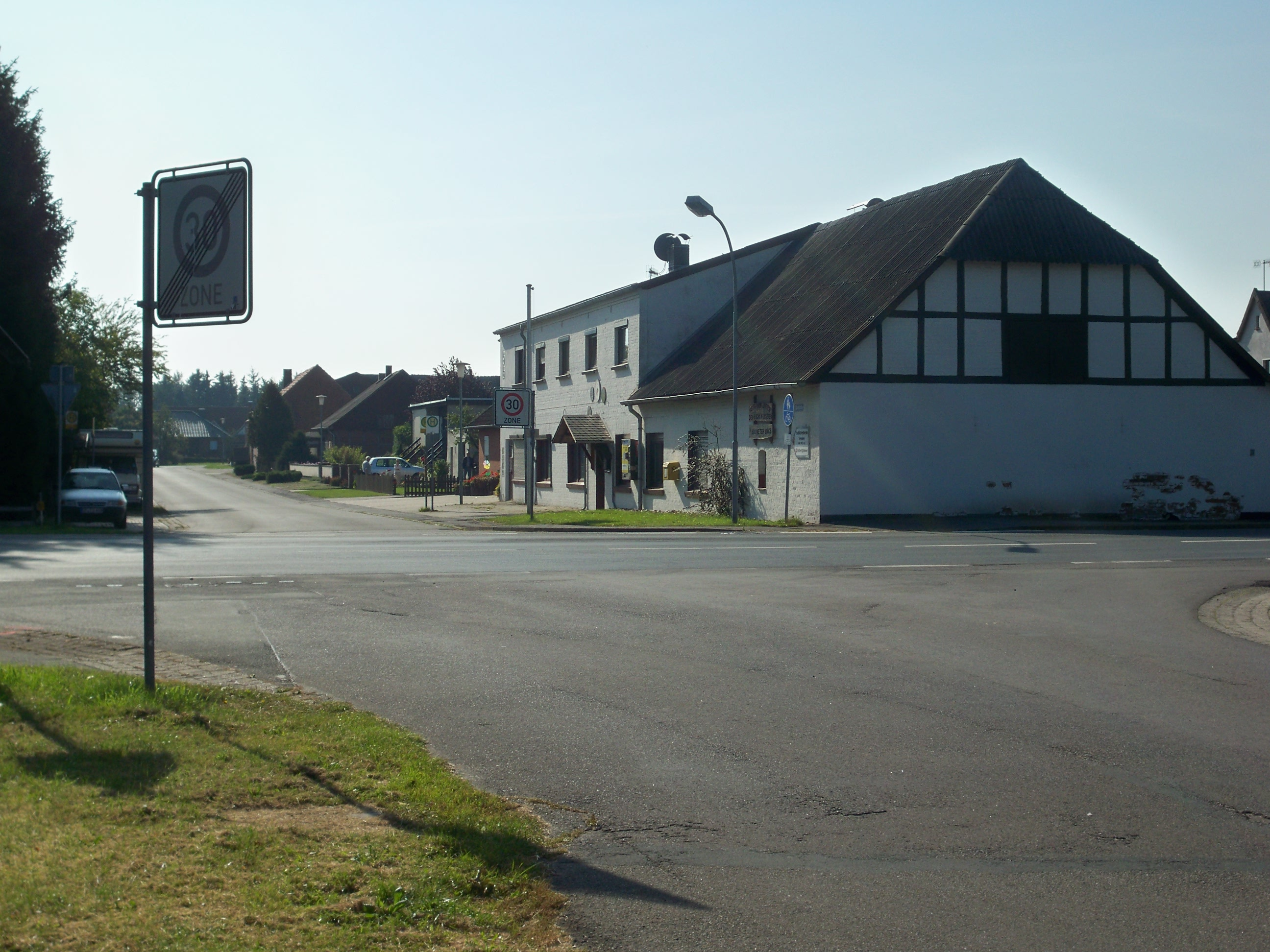
Lessien with old inn

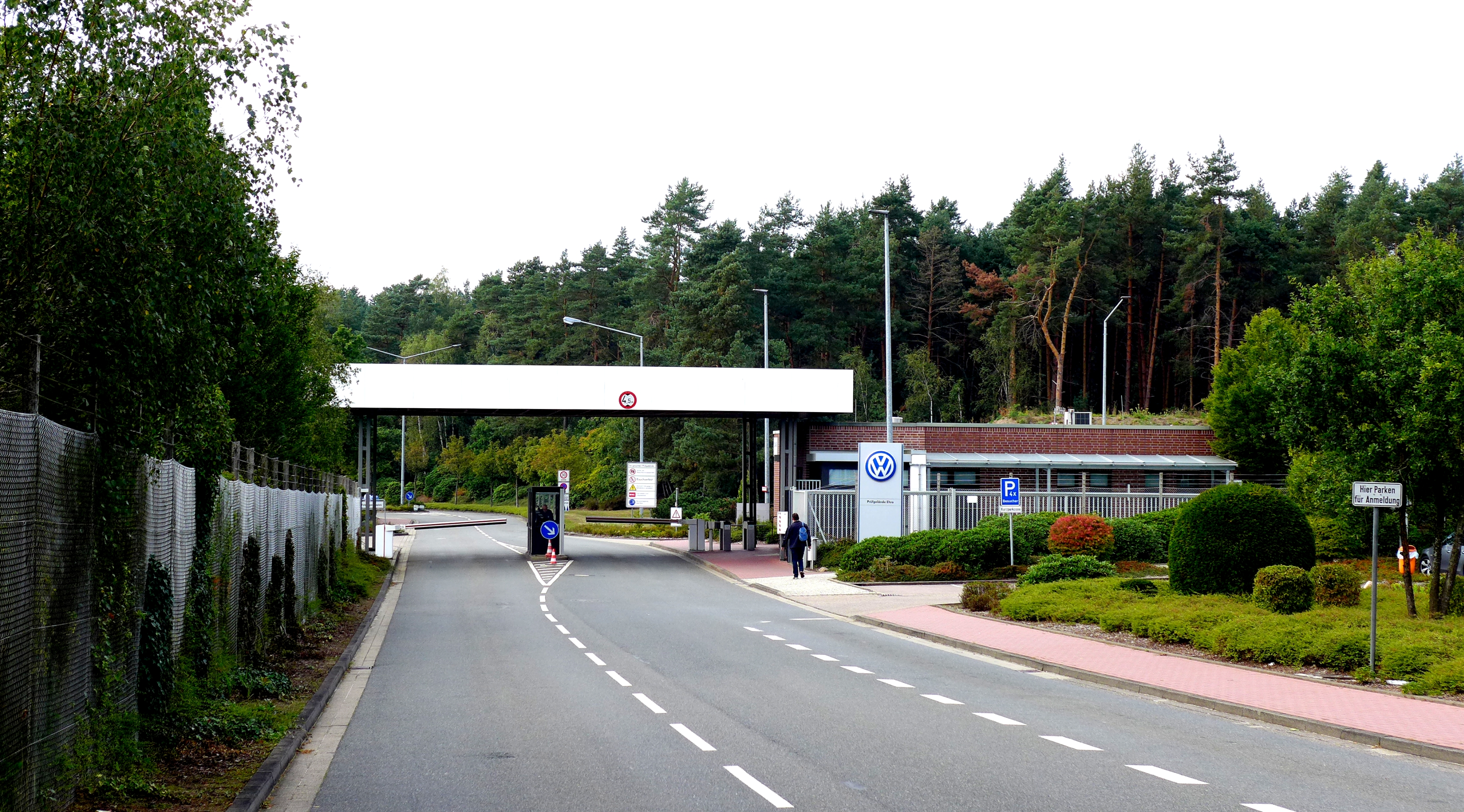
Test track entrance
