= Brome (Samtgemeinde) =

- Samtgemeinde
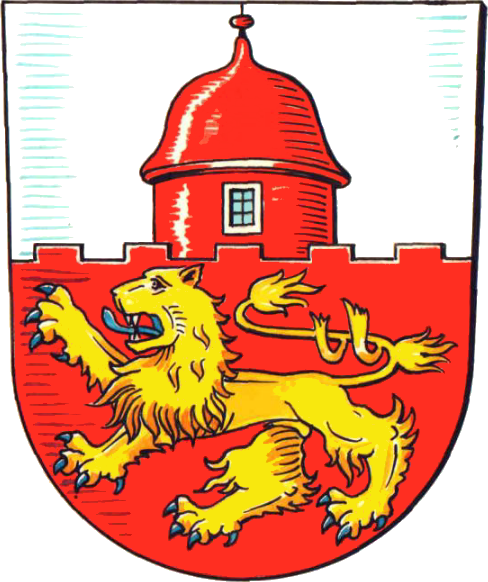
- Coat of arms

- Location of Brome within Gifhorn district
- Interactive map of Brome
- Location within Germany Location within Lower Saxony
- Coordinates: 52°35′N 10°56′E
- Country: Germany
- State: Lower Saxony
- District: Gifhorn
- Subdivisions: 7 Mitgliedsgemeinden

Government
  - Mayor (2021–26): Wieland Bartels (SPD)

Area
  - Total: 203.87 km^{2} (78.71 sq mi)
- Elevation: 66 m (217 ft)

Population (2025-12-31)
  - Total: 16,053
  - Density: 78.741/km^{2} (203.94/sq mi)
- Time zone: UTC+01:00 (CET)
  - Summer (DST): UTC+02:00 (CEST)
- Vehicle registration: GF
- Website: www.samtgemeinde-brome.de

Samtgemeinde Brome is a Samtgemeinde in the district of Gifhorn, in Lower Saxony, Germany. It is situated approximately 20 km north-east of Gifhorn and 10 km north of Wolfsburg. 16,660 citizens are living in the Samtgemeinde Brome (2020).

== Structure of the Samtgemeinde Brome ==
Structure of the Samtgemeinde
Municipality	Inhabitants (30 June 2006)	Surface in km^{2}	Population density in inhabitants/km^{2}	Villages
Bergfeld	923	10,6	90	Bergfeld
Brome	3 399	36,66	93	Altendorf, Benitz, Brome, Wiswedel, Zicherie
Ehra-Lessien	1 622	56,08	29	Ehra, Lessien
Parsau	1 923	29,33	66	Ahnebeck, Croya, Parsau, Kaiserwinkel
Rühen	4 841	30,89	151	Brechtorf, Eischott, Rühen
Tiddische	1 266	16,78	76	Hoitlingen, Tiddische
Tülau	1 471	23,53	63	Tülau-Fahrenholz, Voitze
