= Parsau =

- Municipality
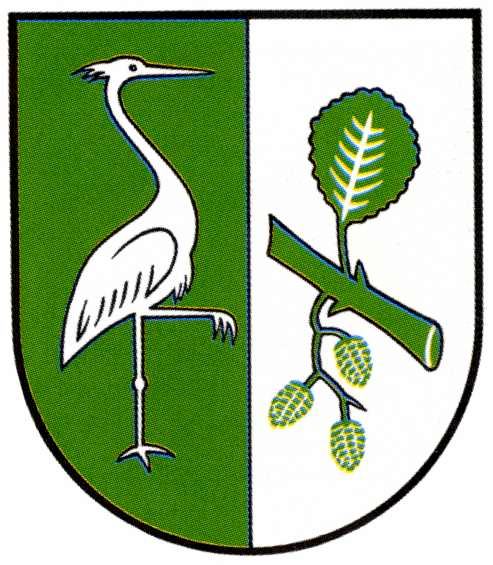
- Coat of arms

- Location of Parsau within Gifhorn district
- Interactive map of Parsau
- Location within Germany Location within Lower Saxony
- Coordinates: 52°32′N 10°52′E
- Country: Germany
- State: Lower Saxony
- District: Gifhorn
- Municipal assoc.: Brome
- Subdivisions: 4

Government
  - Mayor: Kerstin Keil (CDU)

Area
  - Total: 29.33 km^{2} (11.32 sq mi)
- Elevation: 62 m (203 ft)

Population (2025-12-31)
  - Total: 1,934
  - Density: 65.94/km^{2} (170.8/sq mi)
- Time zone: UTC+01:00 (CET)
  - Summer (DST): UTC+02:00 (CEST)
- Postal codes: 38470
- Dialling codes: 05368
- Vehicle registration: GF

Parsau is a municipality in the district of Gifhorn, in Lower Saxony, Germany. The Municipality Parsau includes the villages of Ahnebeck, Croya, Kaiserwinnkel and Parsau.

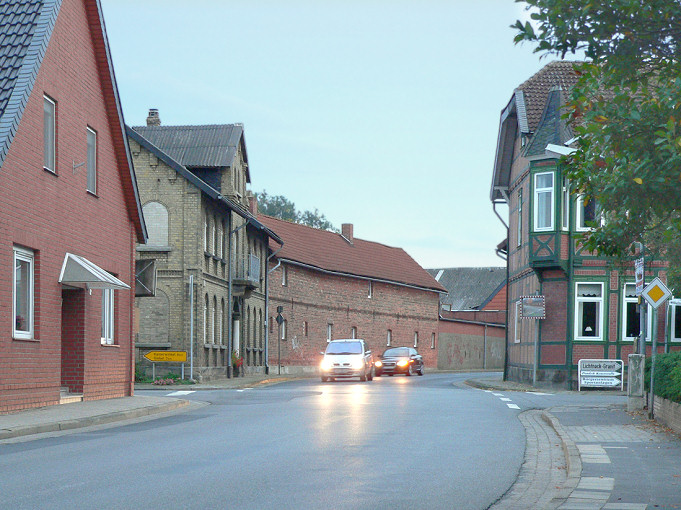
The main street

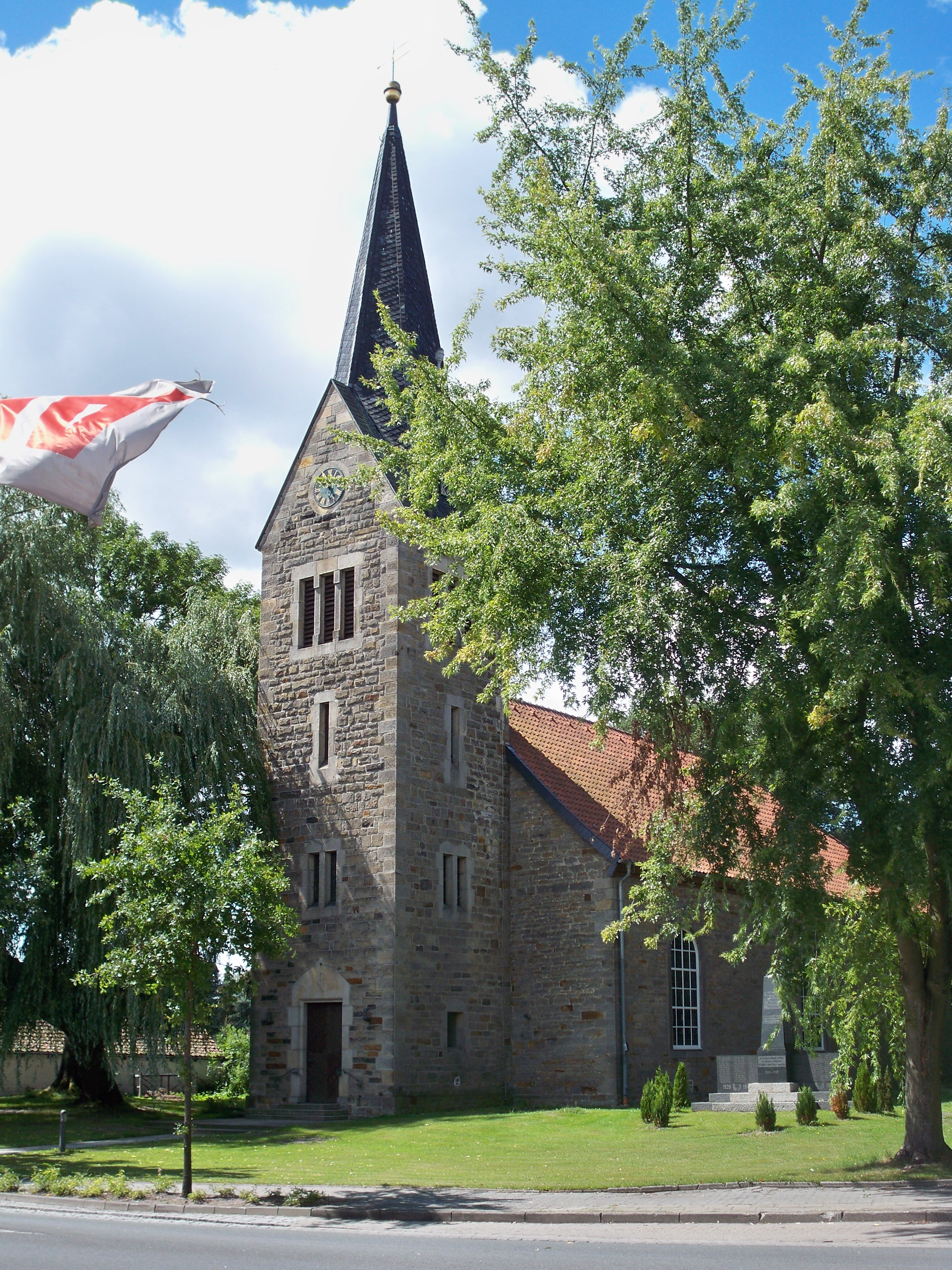
The Lutheran church

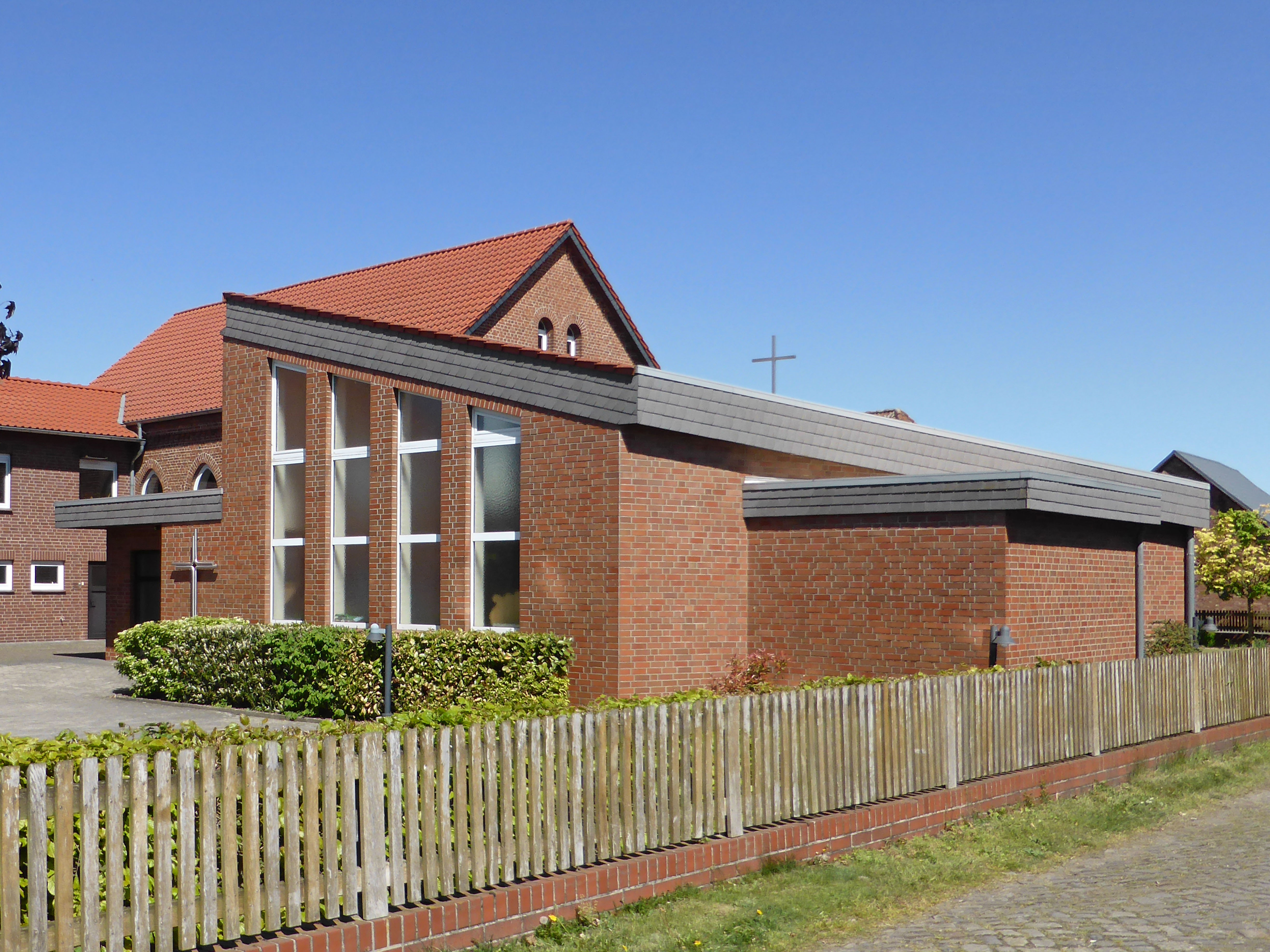
The Baptist church

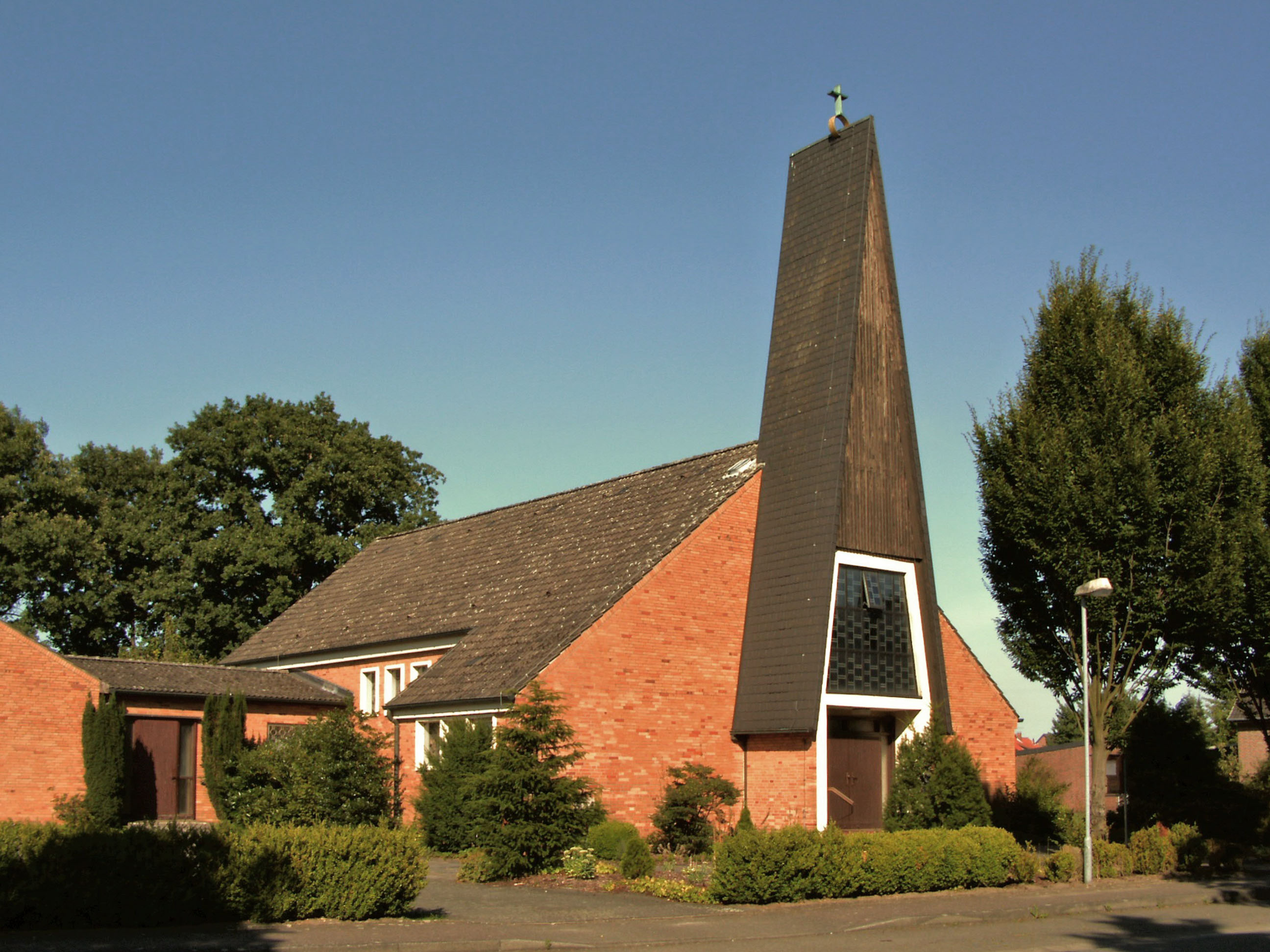
The catholic church

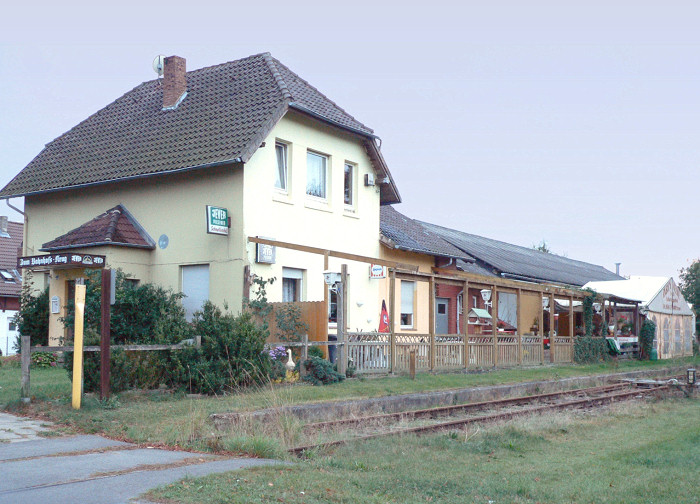
The former station
