= Rühen =

- Municipality
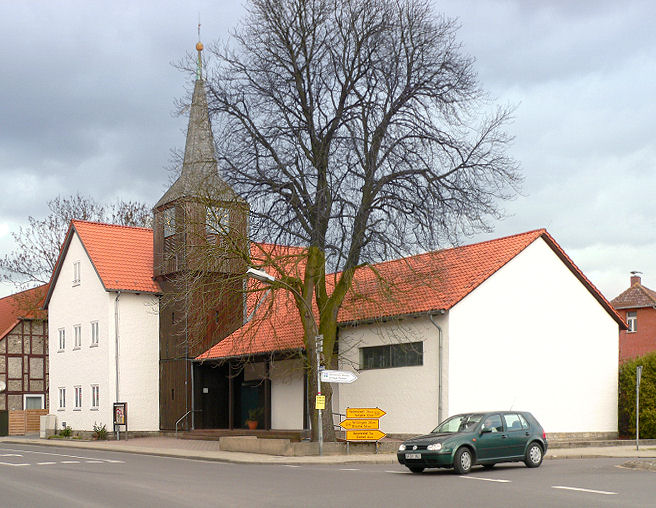
- Lutheran church

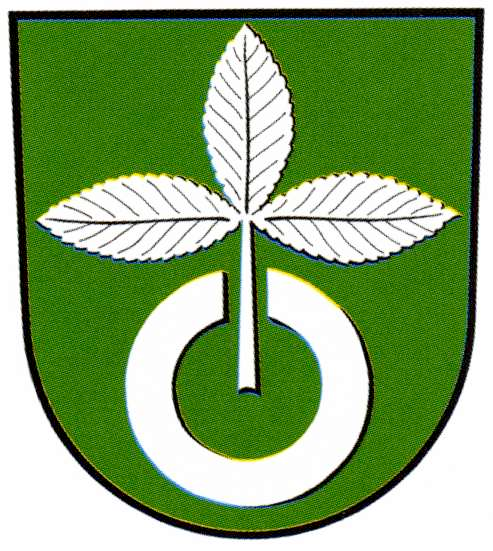
- Coat of arms

- Location of Rühen within Gifhorn district
- Interactive map of Rühen
- Location within Germany Location within Lower Saxony
- Coordinates: 52°29′N 10°52′E
- Country: Germany
- State: Lower Saxony
- District: Gifhorn
- Municipal assoc.: Brome
- Subdivisions: 3

Government
  - Mayor: Theo Bossert (CDU)

Area
  - Total: 30.94 km^{2} (11.95 sq mi)
- Elevation: 65 m (213 ft)

Population (2025-12-31)
  - Total: 5,760
  - Density: 186/km^{2} (482/sq mi)
- Time zone: UTC+01:00 (CET)
  - Summer (DST): UTC+02:00 (CEST)
- Postal codes: 38471
- Dialling codes: 05367
- Vehicle registration: GF

Rühen (German pronunciation: [ˈʁyːən]) is a municipality in the district of Gifhorn, in Lower Saxony, Germany. The Municipality Rühen includes the villages of Brechtorf, Eischott and Rühen.

== History ==
Between 1945 and 1990 Rühen served as West German inner German border crossing for inland navigation on the Mittellandkanal. The crossing was open for freight vessels navigating between the Soviet Zone of occupation in Germany (till 1949, thereafter the East German Democratic Republic), or West Berlin and the British zone of occupation (till 1949) and thereafter the West German Federal Republic of Germany. The traffic was subject to the Interzonal traffic regulations, that between West Germany and West Berlin followed the special regulations of the Transit Agreement (1972).

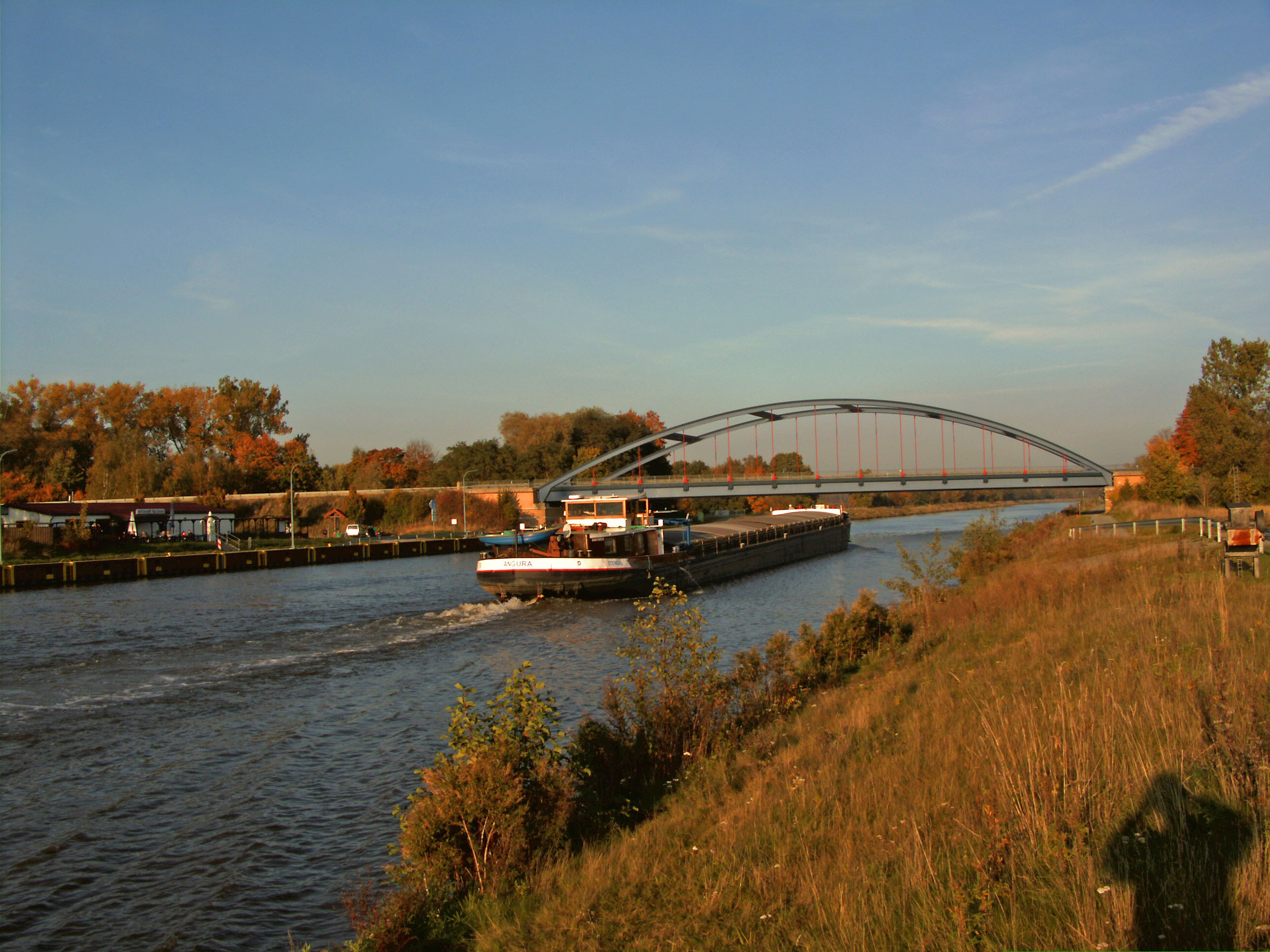
Mittellandkanal near Rühen
