= Urian =

Urian is a Celtic noble male given name (also Urien, Uryen, Uren, presumably derived from British Urbgen). It is recorded in 1273 in the Hundred Rolls of Huntingdonshire in a reference to a "John, son of Urian". In the 12th century, Geoffrey of Monmouth used the Latinized form Urbianus for the semi-legendary British king Urien.

In the modern period, Urian also occurs as a surname.

== People ==
Notable people with the given name include:

- Urian Brereton (died 1577), groom to Henry VIII
- Urian Oakes (1631–1681), English-born American minister and Latinist

== In German literature ==
In early modern Germany the expression Herr Urian or Meister Urian denoted a proverbial unwanted guest and figures in works of fiction such as Matthias Claudius' Urians Reise um die Welt (set by Beethoven as Opus 52, No. 1, 1805, and later by Carl Loewe as Opus 84, 1843), in the Walpurgisnacht scene of Goethe's Faust, eine Tragödie (1808), where it refers to the devil, and E.T.A. Hoffmann's The Life and Opinions of the Tomcat Murr (1819 -1821). The same meaning of the name can be found in E. T. A. Hoffmann's short story "Vampirismus or Aurelia" in The Serapion Brethren, in which a terrifying man wanted by the police corrupts the narrator's mother to the point where she becomes thirsty for corpses.

== See also ==
- Uriel, the angel
- Urania, muse of astronomy
