= Tiddische =

- Municipality
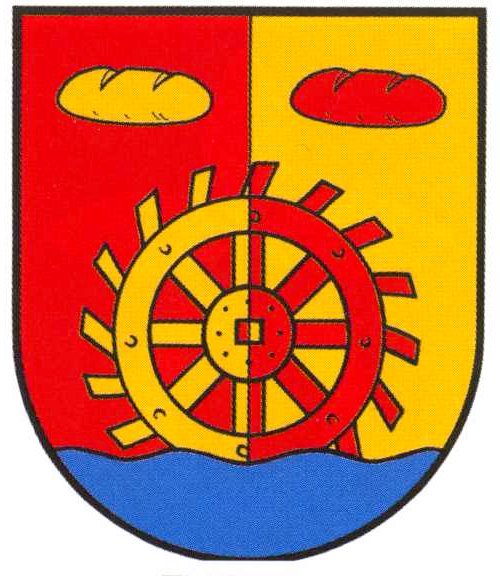
- Coat of arms

- Location of Tiddische within Gifhorn district
- Interactive map of Tiddische
- Location within Germany Location within Lower Saxony
- Coordinates: 52°31′N 10°48′E
- Country: Germany
- State: Lower Saxony
- District: Gifhorn
- Municipal assoc.: Brome
- Subdivisions: 2

Government
  - Mayor: Daniel Krause (SPD)

Area
  - Total: 16.78 km^{2} (6.48 sq mi)
- Elevation: 62 m (203 ft)

Population (2025-12-31)
  - Total: 1,243
  - Density: 74.08/km^{2} (191.9/sq mi)
- Time zone: UTC+01:00 (CET)
  - Summer (DST): UTC+02:00 (CEST)
- Postal codes: 38473
- Dialling codes: 05366
- Vehicle registration: GF

Tiddische is a municipality in the district of Gifhorn, in Lower Saxony, Germany. The Municipality Tiddische includes the villages Hoitlingen and Tiddische.

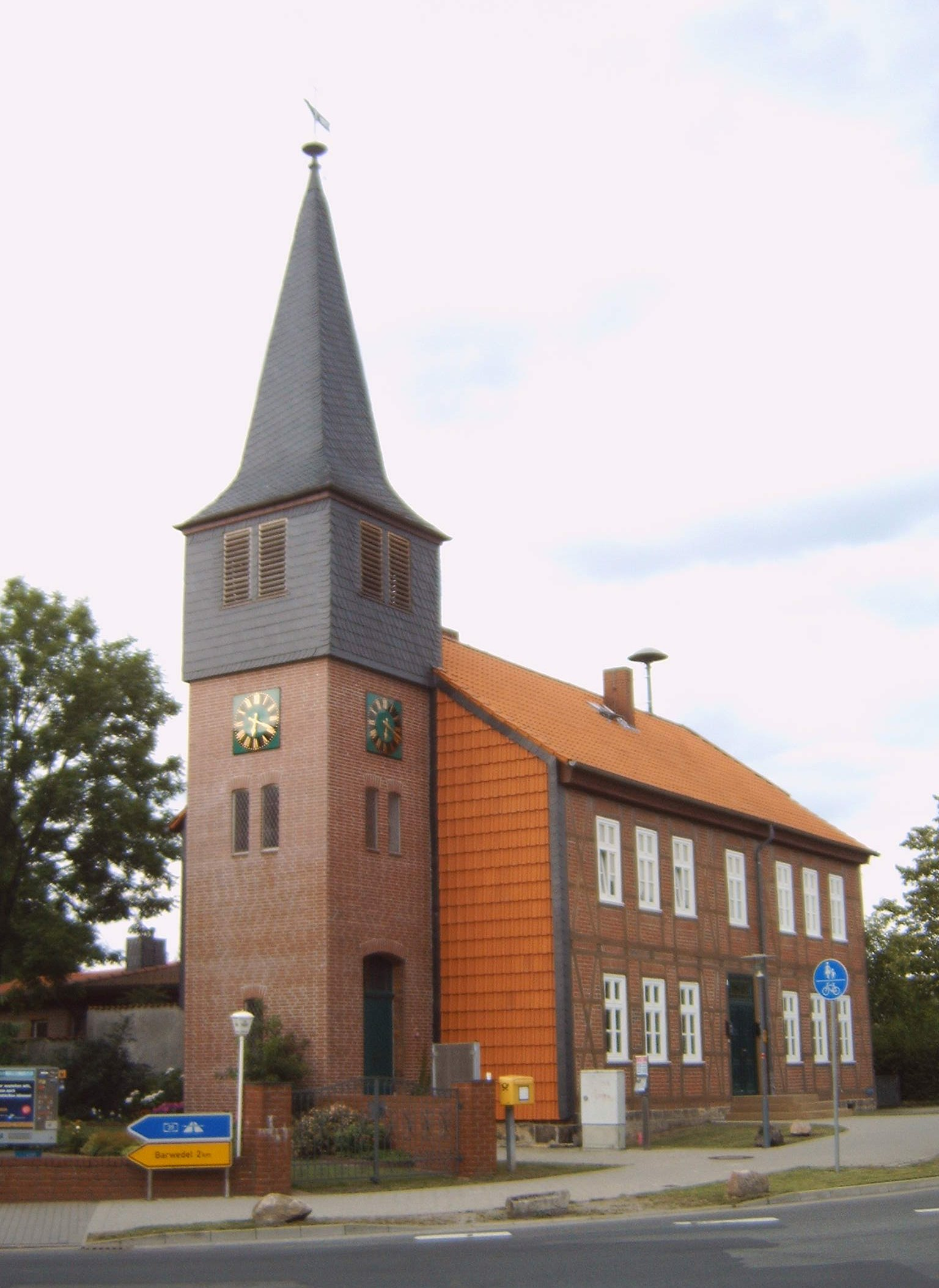
The lutheran church in the old school in Tiddische
