= Lechința (Mureș) =

Lechința Komlód-patak, Comlod
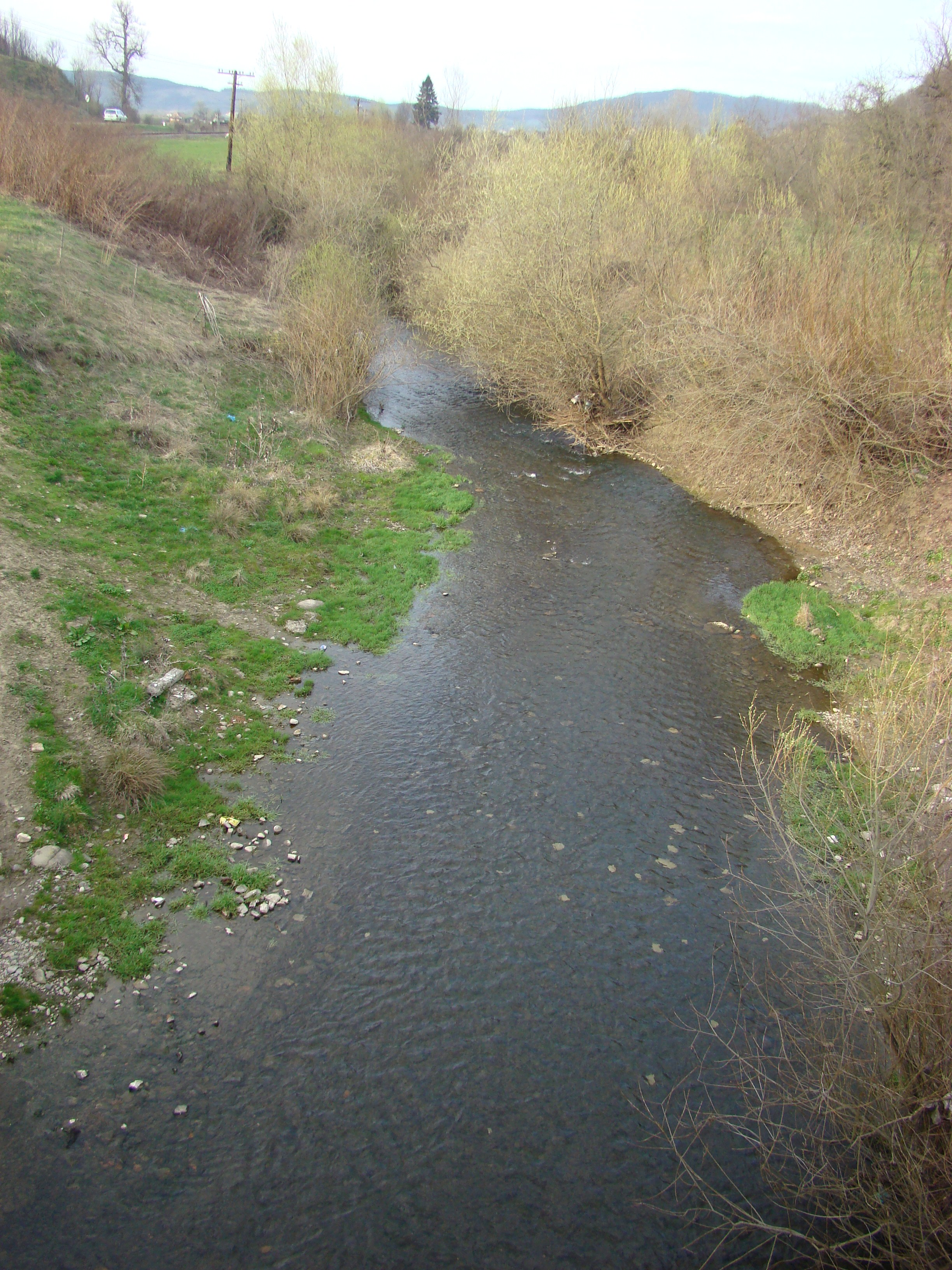

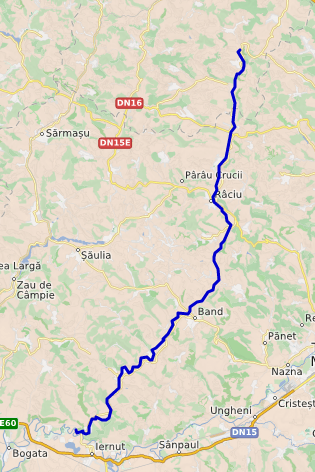
- Course of the Lechința.

- Location within Romania

Location
- Country: Romania
- Counties: Bistrița-Năsăud, Mureș
- Communes: Milaș, Crăiești, Râciu, Șincai, Band, Iclănzel, Iernut

Physical characteristics
- Source
  - elevation: 440 m (1,440 ft)
- Mouth: Mureș
  - location: Lechința
  - coordinates: 46.4736°N 24.2114°E
- Length: 66 km (41 mi)
- Basin size: 537 km^{2} (207 sq mi)

Basin features
- Progression: Mureș→ Tisza→ Danube→ Black Sea

The Lechința or Comlod (Hungarian: Komlód-patak) is a right tributary of the river Mureș in Transylvania, Romania. It discharges into the Mureș in the village Lechința, near Iernut. Its length is 66 km (41 mi) and its basin size is 537 km^{2} (207 sq mi). Its Hungarian name is from the “komló” for hops, so its name means “Hops Creek”.

== Tributaries ==
The following rivers are tributaries to the river Lechința (from source to mouth):

- Left: Ghemeș, Bozed
- Right: Ghilbulcuț, Valea Mare (Șopteriu), Urmeniș, Ulieș, Sărături, Drăculea, Valea Lungă, Icland
