= Valea din Jos =

Valea din Jos Uraly-patak
- Location within Romania

Location
- Country: Romania
- Counties: Mureș County
- Villages: Oroiu, Vaideiu, Dileu Vechi

Physical characteristics
- Mouth: Mureș
  - location: Oarba de Mureș
  - coordinates: 46.4582°N 24.2993°E
- Length: 14 km (8.7 mi)
- Basin size: 38 km^{2} (15 sq mi)

Basin features
- Progression: Mureș→ Tisza→ Danube→ Black Sea
- River code: IV.1.71

The Valea din Jos is a right tributary of the Mureș in Mureș County, Romania. It flows into the Mureș near Oarba de Mureș. Its length is 14 km (8.7 mi) and its basin size is 38 km^{2} (15 sq mi).
