= Hodo =

Hodo may refer to the following:

== Companies ==
- Hodo, Inc., an American food company

== People ==
- Bledar Hodo (born 1985) Albanian former professional footballer
- David Hodo (born 1947) American dancer and singer
- Hōdō Nakamura (中村 法道; born 1950), Japanese politician and a former governor
- Hodo Nivica (1809–1852), Albanian activist leader
- Hodo Sokoli (1836–1883), Ottoman Albanian miralay
- Odo I, Margrave of the Saxon Ostmark (c. 930–993), German noble

== Places ==
- Hodo Gap, a gap in the U.S. state of Georgia
- Pya-Hodo, Kozah Prefecture, Togo; the location of the Pya-Hodo Massacre

== Others ==
- Hōdō, Japanese mythical figure
- Pya-Hodo Massacre, Togo refers to a massacre that took place on June 21, 1957

== See also ==
- Hodos (disambiguation)
