= Iernut =

Town in Mureș County, Transylvania, Romania

- Town
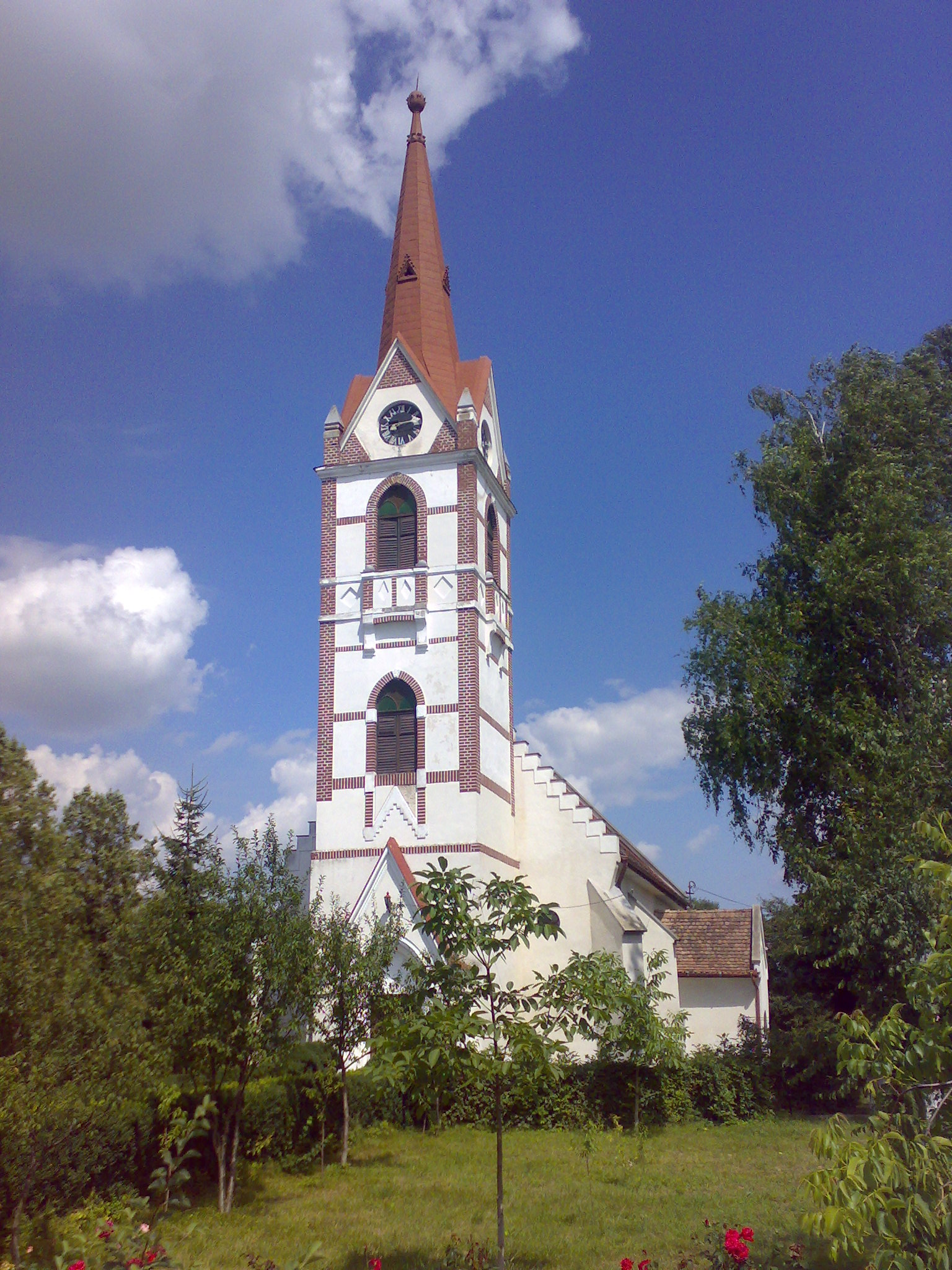
- Reformed church, begun in 1486

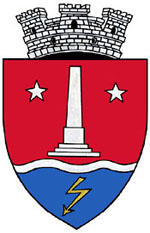
- Coat of arms

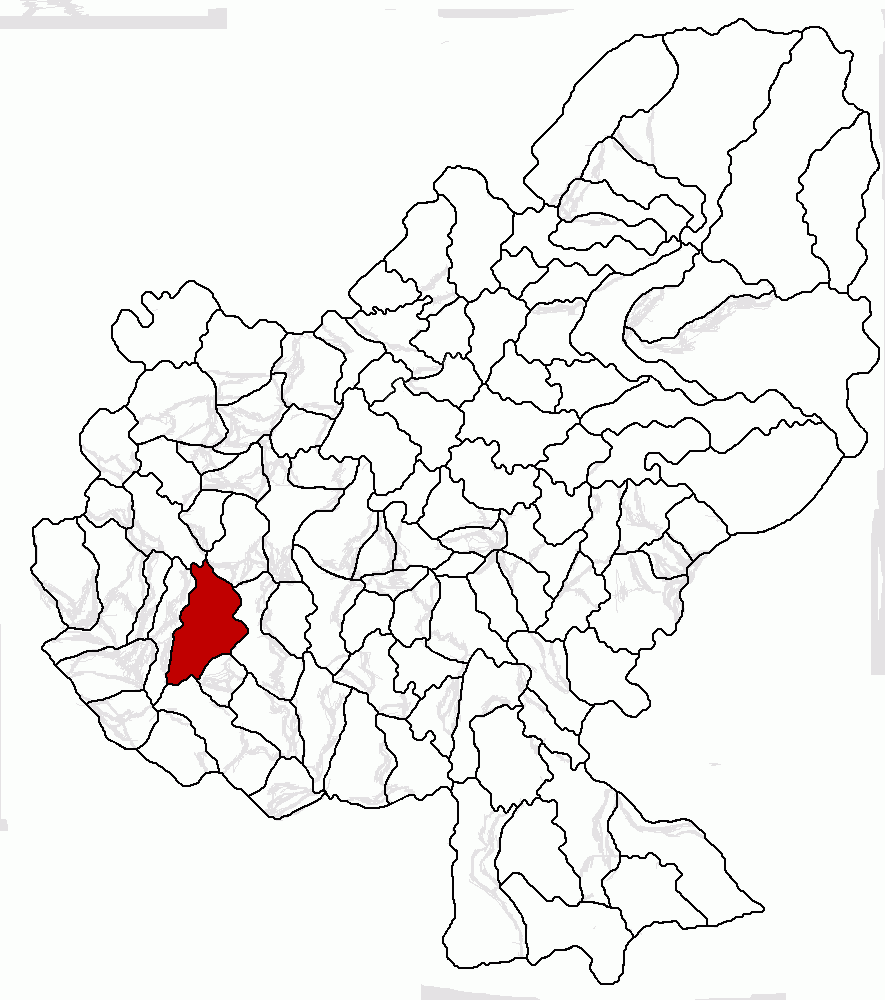
- Location in Mureș County

- Location in Romania
- Coordinates: 46°27′13″N 24°14′0″E
- Country: Romania
- County: Mureș

Government
  - Mayor (2024–2028): Horațiu-Octavian Moldovan (PSD)
- Area: 106.36 km^{2} (41.07 sq mi)
- Elevation: 276 m (906 ft)
- Population (2021-12-01): 8,473
  - Density: 79.66/km^{2} (206.3/sq mi)
- Time zone: UTC+02:00 (EET)
  - Summer (DST): UTC+03:00 (EEST)
- Postal code: 545100
- Area code: (+40) 02 65
- Vehicle reg.: MS
- Website: www.primariaiernut.ro

Iernut (Hungarian: Radnót, pronounced [ˈrɒdnoːt]) is a town in Mureș County, central Transylvania, Romania. It administers eight villages: Cipău (Maroscsapó), Deag (Marosdég), Lechința (Maroslekence), Oarba de Mureș (Marosorbó), Porumbac (Porumbáktanya), Racameț (Józseftanya), Sălcud (Szélkút), and Sfântu Gheorghe (Csapószentgyörgy). It officially became a town in 1989, as a result of the Romanian rural systematization program.

== Geography ==
The town is situated on the Transylvanian Plateau. It lies on the banks of the Mureș River; the Lechința and Valea din Jos rivers discharge into the Mureș here.

Iernut is located in the southwestern part of Mureș County, 19 km (12 mi) north of Târnăveni and 30 km (19 mi) west of the county seat, Târgu Mureș. It lies at the intersection of two national roads: DN15, which runs from Turda in Cluj County to Târgu Mureș and on to Bacău in Western Moldavia, and DN14A, which connects Iernut to Târnăveni and ends in Mediaș, Sibiu County. The partially built A3 motorway (Autostrada Transilvania), which connects Bucharest to the Hungarian border near Oradea, runs just south of the town.

== History ==
Artifacts from the Wietenberg culture (a Middle Bronze Age archeological culture that roughly dates to 2200–1600/1500 BC) have been discovered in Lechința. After 1570, the town became part of the Principality of Transylvania. The Treaty of Radnot was signed here on 6 December 1656, during the Second Northern War; the treaty divided the Polish–Lithuanian Commonwealth between the signing parties. Frequent invasions forced Michael I Apafi, Prince of Transylvania, to convoke the Transylvanian Diet to the fortress of Radnót in the late 1680s. Starting in the Middle Ages, the settlement was part of Küküllő County in the Kingdom of Hungary; in 1876, the county was split in two, and Radnót fell within Kis-Küküllő County.

In the aftermath of World War I, the Union of Transylvania with Romania was declared in December 1918. At the start of the Hungarian–Romanian War of 1918–1919, the locality passed under Romanian administration; after the Treaty of Trianon of 1920, it became part of the Kingdom of Romania. Iernut became the seat of Plasa Iernut in Târnava-Mică County; the villages Lechința de Mureș and Oarba de Mureș fell within Plasa Luduș, in Turda County.

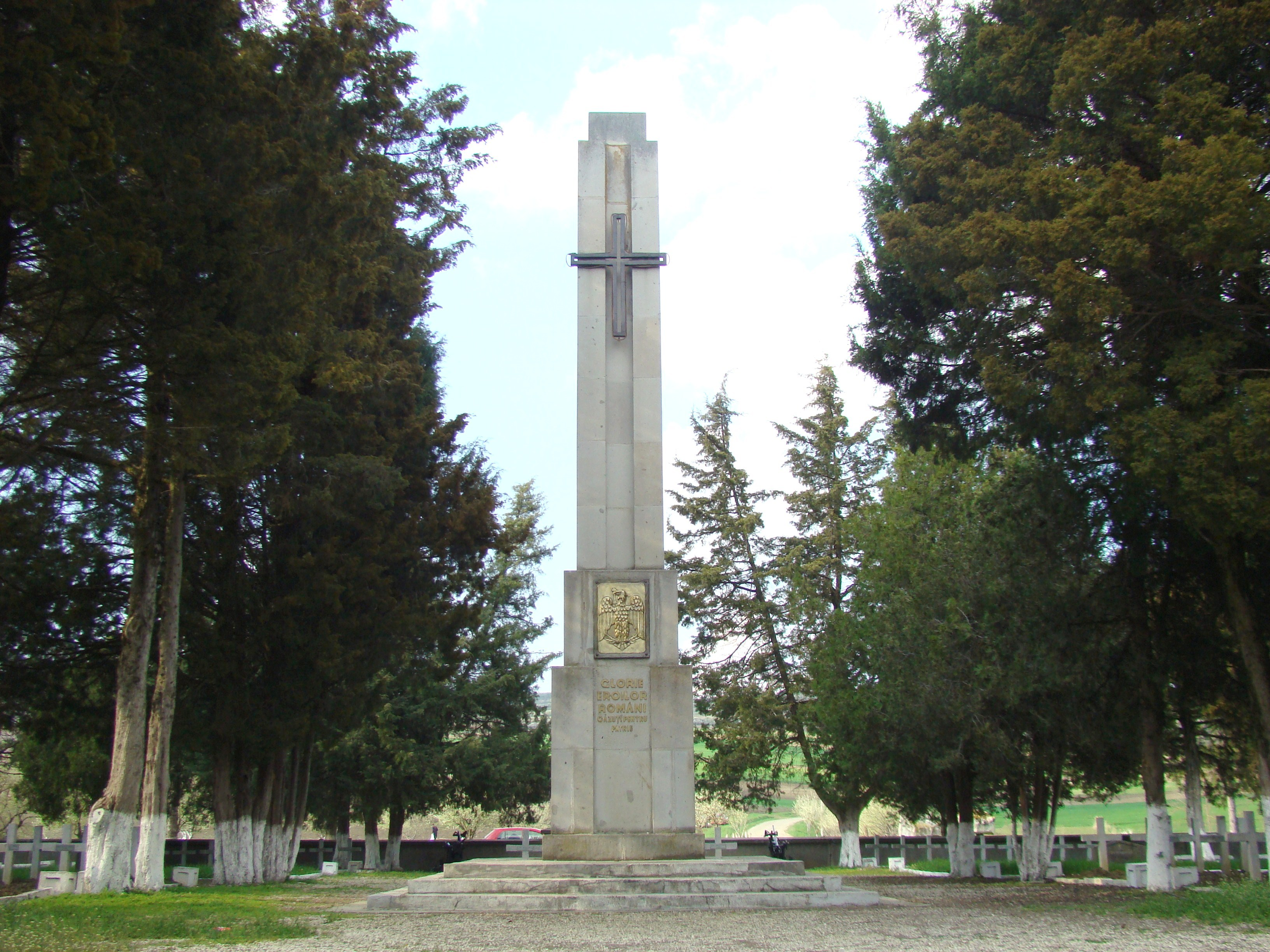
The Oarba de Mureș war monument

In World War II, from 16 September to 6 October 1944, fierce fighting between the Romanian Fourth Army (under the command of Soviet general Sergei Trofimenko) and the German 8th Army occurred at the Oarba de Mureș Battle for the nearby Sângerogiu Hill. Some 11,000 Romanian soldiers lost their lives in this battle.

After the advent of the Romanian People's Republic, Iernut became in 1950 part of the Turda raion of Cluj Region. Between 1952 and 1960, it fell within the Magyar Autonomous Region, and between 1960 and 1968, the Mureș-Magyar Autonomous Region. In 1968, the region was abolished, and since then, the settlement has been part of Mureș County.

== Demographics ==
Historical population
| Year | Pop. | ±% |
|---|---|---|
| 1850 | 5,268 | — |
| 1880 | 5,123 | −2.8% |
| 1900 | 6,668 | +30.2% |
| 1910 | 7,020 | +5.3% |
| 1930 | 7,830 | +11.5% |
| 1956 | 8,276 | +5.7% |
| 1977 | 10,084 | +21.8% |
| 1992 | 9,719 | −3.6% |
| 2002 | 9,523 | −2.0% |
| 2011 | 8,373 | −12.1% |
| 2021 | 8,473 | +1.2% |
Source: Census data

At the 2021 census, Iernut had a population of 8,473, of which 67.76% were Romanians, 12.26% Roma, 7.87% Hungarians, and 12% others. At the 2011 census, the town had 8,373 inhabitants, of which 76.55% were Romanians, 13.36% Hungarians, 9.84% Roma, and 0.18% others.

== Natives ==
- Cosmina Dușa (born 1990), footballer
- Árpád Makay (1911–2004), Hungarian cinematographer
- István Nagy (1909–1976), Hungarian stage and film actor
- Marius Radu (born 1977), footballer
- Ion Vlasiu (1908–1997), sculptor, painter, and writer

== Main sights ==
- The Reformed church (built between 1486 and 1593)
- The Kornis–Rakóczi–Bethlen Castle (built in 1545)
- The two lakes near the city
- The Mureș River
- The Capitoline Wolf statue
- Old buildings

== Twin towns ==
Iernut is twinned with:

- Bodajk, Hungary
- Calberlah, Germany
- Sint-Katelijne-Waver, Belgium

== See also ==
- Iernut Power Station
