= Icland =

- Location within Romania

Location
- Country: Romania
- Counties: Mureș County
- Villages: Papiu Ilarian, Iclandu Mare, Iclănzel

Physical characteristics
- Mouth: Lechința
  - location: Iclandu Mare
  - coordinates: 46.5257°N 24.2723°E
- Length: 8 km (5.0 mi)
- Basin size: 35 km^{2} (14 sq mi)

Basin features
- Progression: Lechința→ Mureș→ Tisza→ Danube→ Black Sea

The Icland is a right tributary of the river Lechința in Romania. It flows into the Lechința in Iclandu Mare. Its length is 8 km (5.0 mi) and its basin size is 35 km^{2} (14 sq mi).
