= Hodoș =

Hodoș may refer to several places in Romania:

- Hodoș, a village in Sălard Commune, Bihor County
- Hodoș, a village in Brestovăț Commune, Timiș County
- Hodoș, a village in Darova Commune, Timiș County
- Hodoș, a tributary of the Chizdia in Timiș County
- Hodoș (Târnava Mare), a tributary of the Târnava Mare in Harghita County
- Hodoșa (river), a tributary of the Niraj in Mureș County

== See also ==
- Hodoș (surname)
