= Isenbüttel =

- Municipality
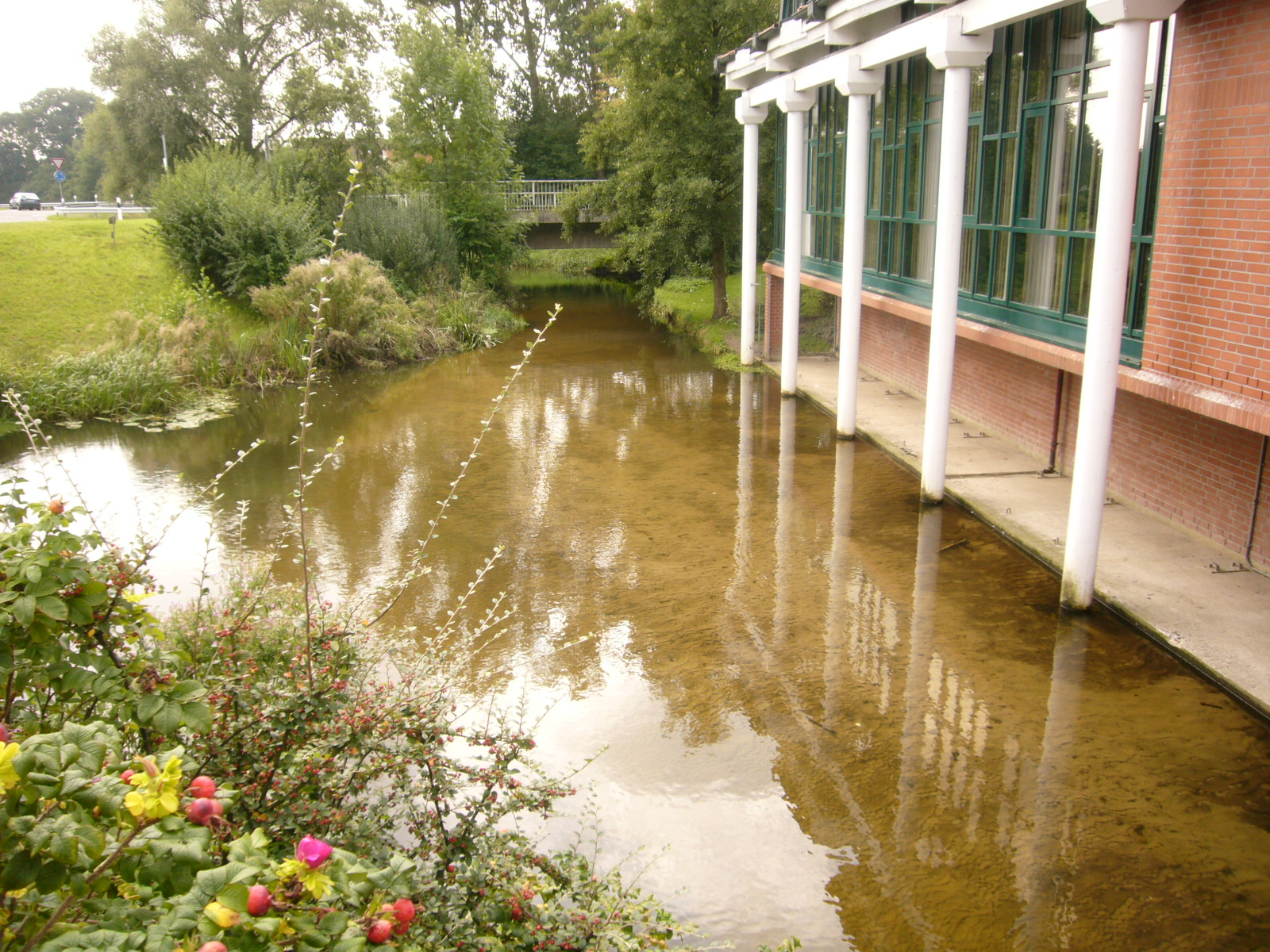
- The river Hehlenriede in Isenbüttel.

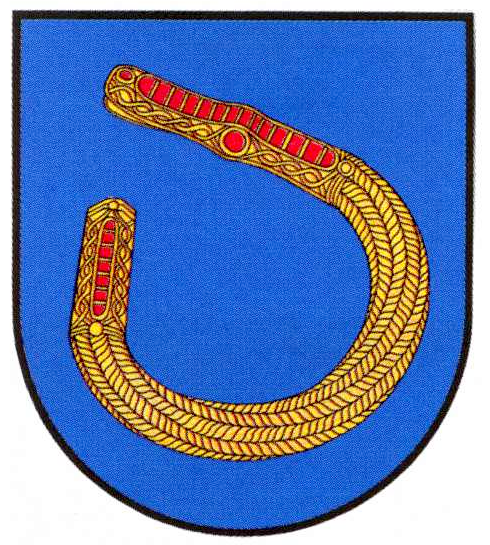
- Coat of arms

- Location of Isenbüttel within Gifhorn district
- Interactive map of Isenbüttel
- Location within Germany Location within Lower Saxony
- Coordinates: 52°26′09″N 10°34′46″E
- Country: Germany
- State: Lower Saxony
- District: Gifhorn
- Municipal assoc.: Isenbüttel
- Subdivisions: 3 Ortsteile

Government
  - Mayor: Peter Zimmermann (SPD)

Area
  - Total: 18.65 km^{2} (7.20 sq mi)
- Elevation: 68 m (223 ft)

Population (2025-12-31)
  - Total: 6,037
  - Density: 323.7/km^{2} (838.4/sq mi)
- Time zone: UTC+01:00 (CET)
  - Summer (DST): UTC+02:00 (CEST)
- Postal codes: 38550
- Dialling codes: 05374
- Vehicle registration: GF
- Website: www.isenbuettel.de

Isenbüttel is a municipality in the district of Gifhorn, in Lower Saxony, Germany. It is situated approximately 6 km southeast of Gifhorn, and 20 km north of Braunschweig.

Isenbüttel is also the seat of the Samtgemeinde Isenbüttel ("collective municipality").

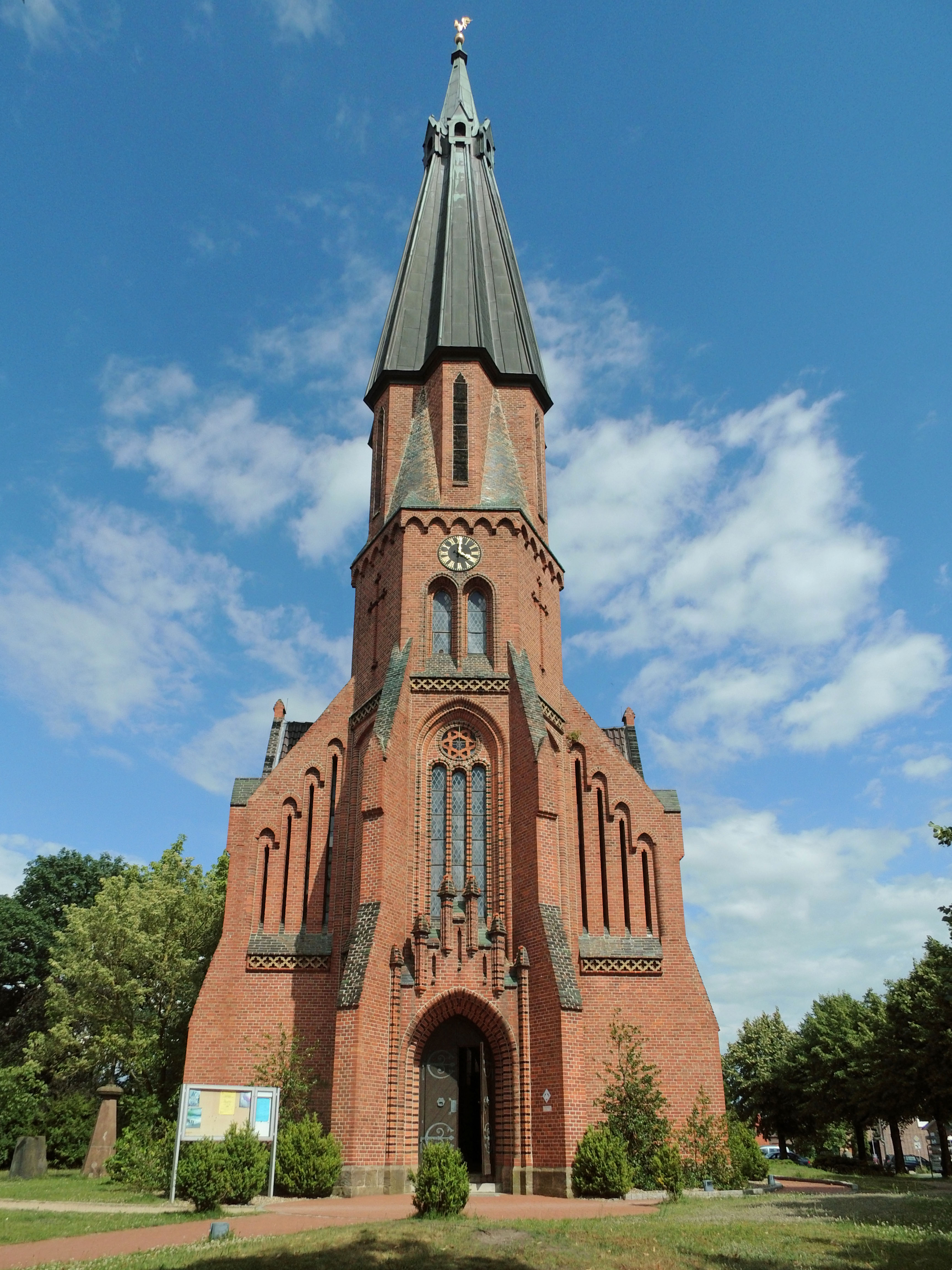
Lutheran church
