= Drăculea (river) =

- Location within Romania

Location
- Country: Romania
- Counties: Mureș County
- Villages: Negrenii de Câmpie, Drăculea Bandului, Mărășești

Physical characteristics
- Mouth: Lechința
  - coordinates: 46.5838°N 24.3512°E
- Length: 11 km (6.8 mi)
- Basin size: 65 km^{2} (25 sq mi)

Basin features
- Progression: Lechința→ Mureș→ Tisza→ Danube→ Black Sea
- Tributaries
  - right: Hârtoape

The Drăculea is a right tributary of the river Lechința in Romania. It flows into the Lechința in Band. Its length is 11 km (6.8 mi) and its basin size is 65 km^{2} (25 sq mi).
