= Budiu =

Budiu may refer to one of two places in Mureș County, Romania:

- Budiu Mic, a village in Crăciunești Commune
- Budiu de Câmpie, the former name of Papiu Ilarian Commune
