= Hodoș (surname) =

Hodoș is a Romanian surname. Notable people with the surname include:

- Iosif Hodoșiu
- Enea Hodoș, son of Iosif
- Ion Gorun (pen name of Alexandru I. Hodoș), brother of Enea
- Constanța Hodoș, wife of Alexandru
