= Bozed =

- Location within Romania

Location
- Country: Romania
- Counties: Mureș County
- Villages: Bozed

Physical characteristics
- Mouth: Lechința
  - location: Lechincioara
  - coordinates: 46.6680°N 24.4234°E
- Length: 7 km (4.3 mi)
- Basin size: 42 km^{2} (16 sq mi)

Basin features
- Progression: Lechința→ Mureș→ Tisza→ Danube→ Black Sea
- Tributaries
  - right: Milășel

The Bozed is a left tributary of the river Lechința in Romania. It flows into the Lechința in Lechincioara. Its length is 7 km (4.3 mi) and its basin size is 42 km^{2} (16 sq mi).
