= Mădăraș, Mureș =

Mădăraș Mezőmadaras
- Commune
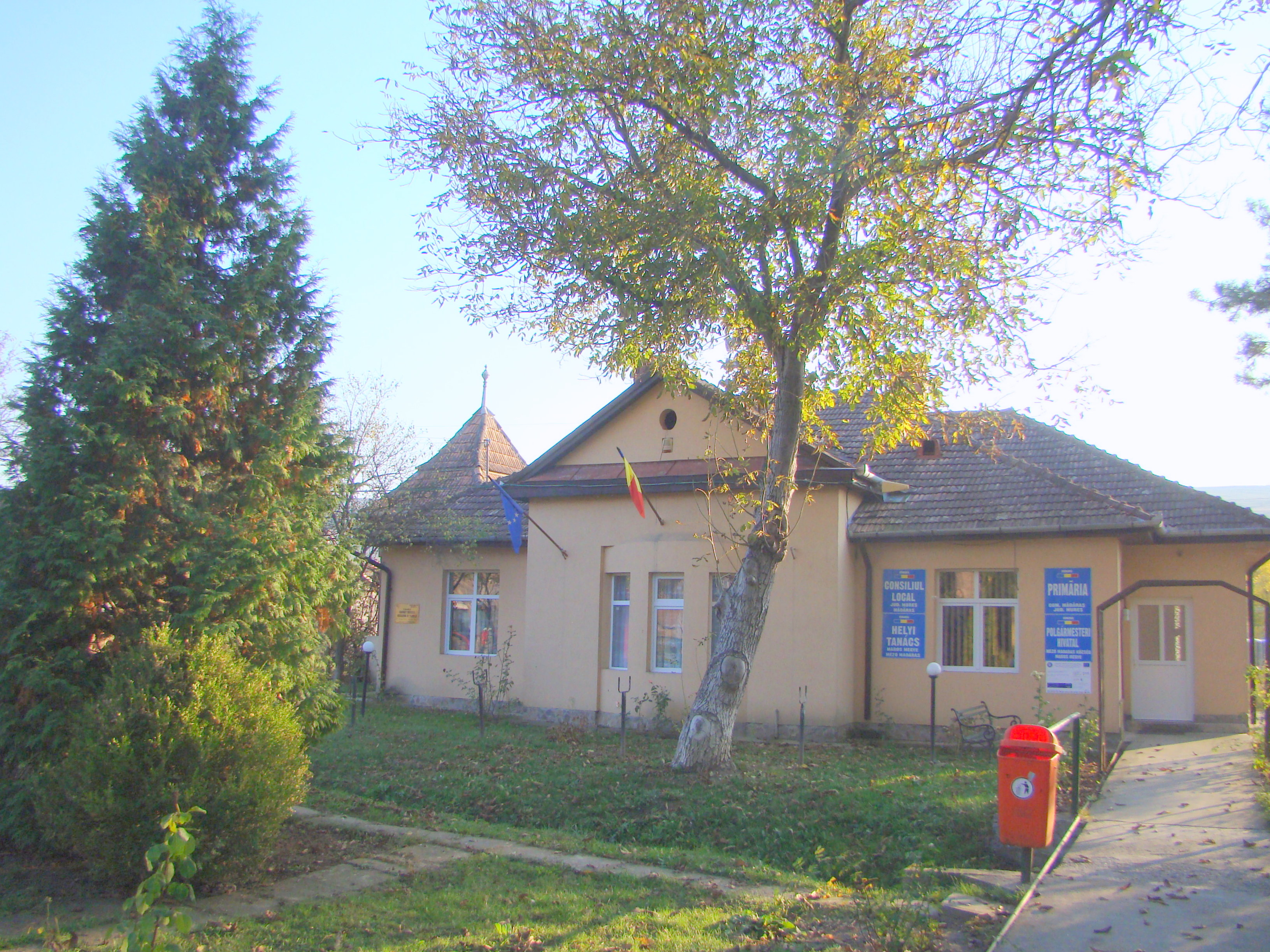
- Mădăraș town hall

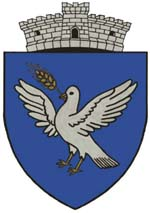
- Coat of arms

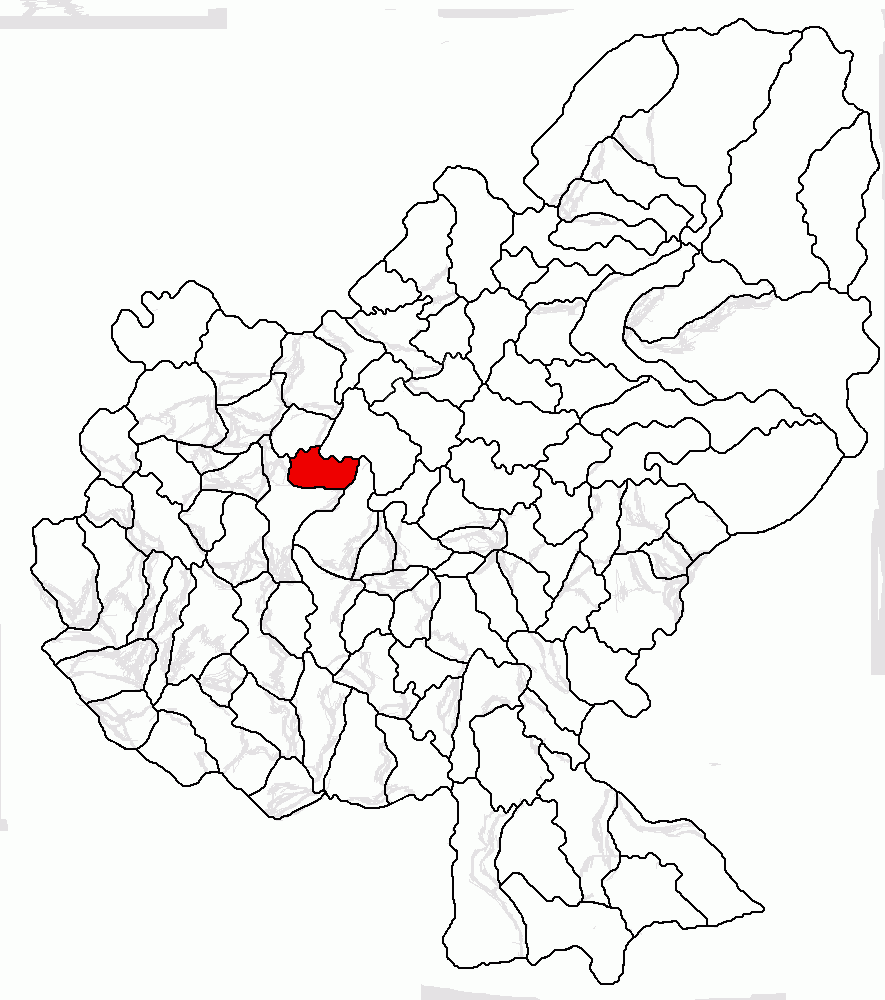
- Location in Mureș County

- Location in Romania
- Coordinates: 46°36′N 24°26′E
- Country: Romania
- County: Mureș

Government
  - Mayor (2020–2024): Ileana Kovács (UDMR)
- Area: 23.27 km^{2} (8.98 sq mi)
- Elevation: 332 m (1,089 ft)
- Population (2021-12-01): 1,475
  - Density: 63.39/km^{2} (164.2/sq mi)
- Time zone: UTC+02:00 (EET)
  - Summer (DST): UTC+03:00 (EEST)
- Postal code: 547071
- Area code: +(40) 265
- Vehicle reg.: MS
- Website: comunamadaras.ro

Mădăraș (Hungarian: Mezőmadaras or colloquially Madaras, Hungarian pronunciation: [ˈmɛzøːmɒdɒrɒʃ]) is a commune in Mureș County, Transylvania, Romania. It became an independent commune when it split from Band in 2004. The commune is composed of two villages, Fânațele Mădărașului (Szénáságy) and Mădăraș. Fânațele Mădărașului village was transferred to Mădăraș from Band Commune in 2011.

== History ==
After 1570, the settlement became part of the Székely Land region of the Principality of Transylvania. In 1876, it fell within the Maros-Torda County of the Kingdom of Hungary. In the aftermath of World War I, the Union of Transylvania with Romania was declared in December 1918. At the start of the Hungarian–Romanian War of 1918–1919, the locality passed under Romanian administration; after the Treaty of Trianon of 1920, it became part of the Kingdom of Romania. In 1925, the village fell within Plasa Band of Mureș County.

After the advent of the Romanian People's Republic, Mădăraș became in 1950 part of the Mureș Region. Between 1952 and 1960, it fell within the Magyar Autonomous Region, and between 1960 and 1968, the Mureș-Magyar Autonomous Region. In 1968, the region was abolished, and since then, the commune has been part of Mureș County.

== Demographics ==
At the 2021 census, Mădăraș had a population of 1,475; of those, 74.78% were Székely Hungarians, 12.14% Roma, and 5.15% Romanians.

== See also ==
- List of Hungarian exonyms (Mureș County)
