= Church between the Fir trees =

Romanian Orthodox church in Sibiu, Romania

Coordinates: 45.7999086°N 24.1411418°E

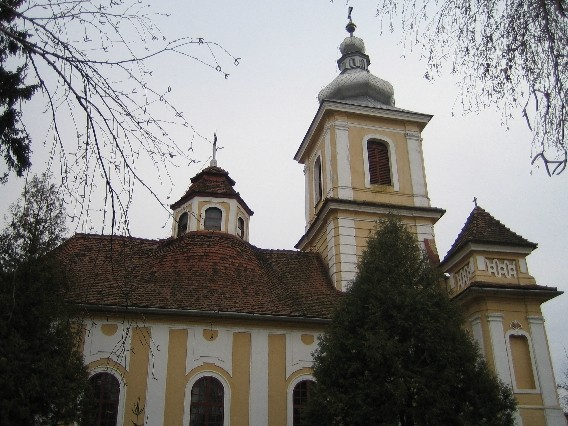
- Church between the Fir trees in Sibiu, Romania

Religion
- Affiliation: Romanian Orthodox Church
- Year consecrated: 1788

Location
- Location: Sibiu
- Interactive map of Church between the Fir trees

Architecture
- Type: Church
- Style: Baroque
- Groundbreaking: 1778
- Completed: 1788

The Church between the Fir trees (Romanian: Biserica dintre brazi), otherwise the Church of Saints Peter and Paul (Biserica Sfinții Petru și Pavel), is a Romanian Orthodox church located at 17 Reconstrucției Street, Sibiu, Romania.

The church is listed as a historic monument by Romania's Ministry of Culture and Religious Affairs. The church was Greek-Catholic prior to 1948, when the nascent communist regime outlawed the church and confiscated its properties.

Important 19th-century and 20th-century figures are buried in the church cemetery, including George Bariț, Alexandru Papiu Ilarian, Ioan Rațiu and Alexandru Vaida-Voevod.
