= Ogra mine =

Salt mine in Mureș County, Romania

- Location within Romania
- Location: Ogra, Mureș County, Romania; 46°28′15.92″N 24°18′35.57″E
- Products: Sodium chloride
- Company: Salrom

The Ogra mine is a large salt mine located in central Romania in Mureș County, close to Ogra. Ogra represents one of the largest salt reserves in Romania having estimated reserves of 100 billion tonnes of NaCl.
