= Wasbüttel =

- Municipality
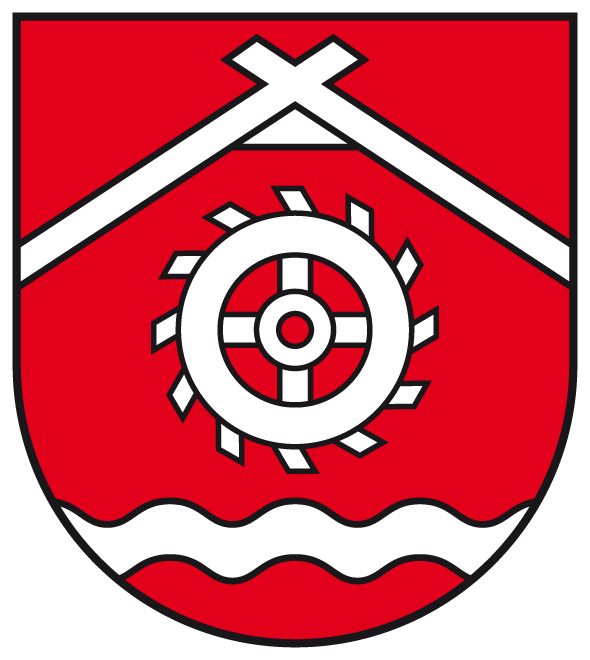
- Coat of arms

- Location of Wasbüttel within Gifhorn district
- Interactive map of Wasbüttel
- Location within Germany Location within Lower Saxony
- Coordinates: 52°24′41″N 10°35′35″E
- Country: Germany
- State: Lower Saxony
- District: Gifhorn
- Municipal assoc.: Isenbüttel

Government
  - Mayor: Lothar Lau

Area
  - Total: 6.51 km^{2} (2.51 sq mi)
- Elevation: 67 m (220 ft)

Population (2025-12-31)
  - Total: 1,843
  - Density: 283/km^{2} (733/sq mi)
- Time zone: UTC+01:00 (CET)
  - Summer (DST): UTC+02:00 (CEST)
- Postal codes: 38553
- Dialling codes: 05374
- Vehicle registration: GF

Wasbüttel is a municipality in the district of Gifhorn, in Lower Saxony, Germany.

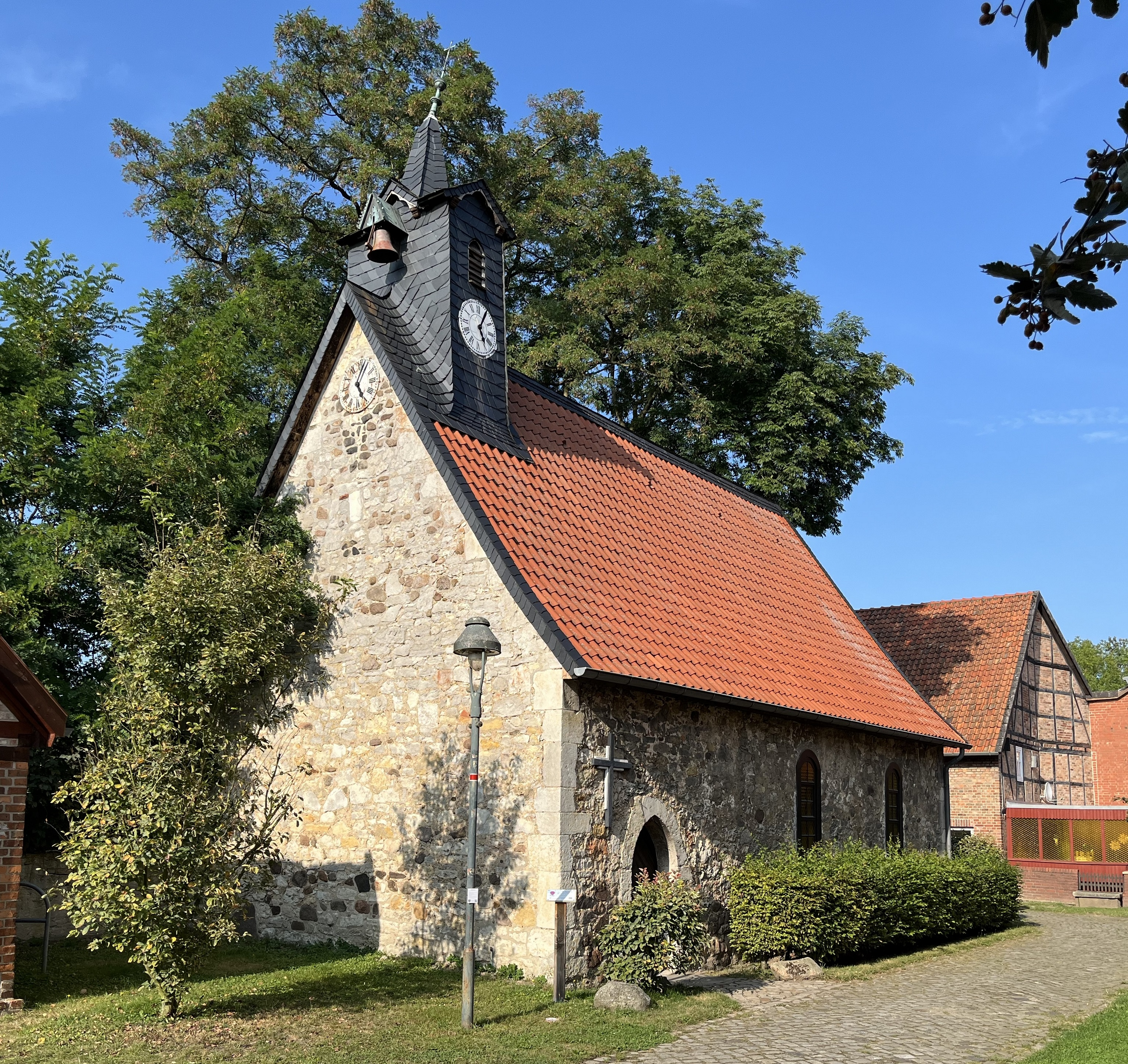
The Lutheran chapel
