= Isenbüttel (Samtgemeinde) =

- Samtgemeinde
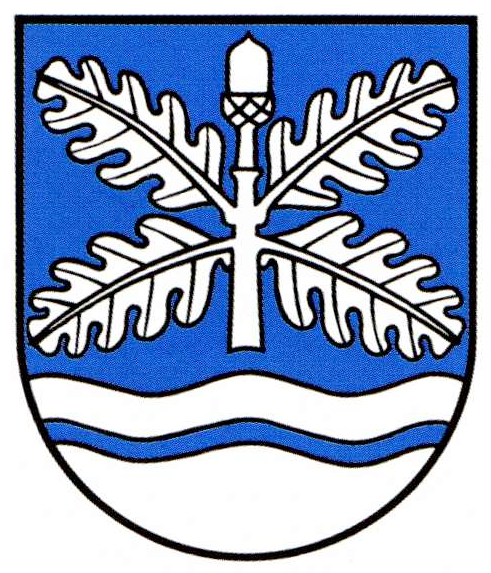
- Coat of arms

- Location of Isenbüttel within Gifhorn district
- Interactive map of Isenbüttel
- Location within Germany Location within Lower Saxony
- Coordinates: 52°26′N 10°35′E
- Country: Germany
- State: Lower Saxony
- District: Gifhorn

Government
  - Mayor (2021–26): Jannis Gaus

Area
  - Total: 77.38 km^{2} (29.88 sq mi)
- Elevation: 59 m (194 ft)

Population (2025-12-31)
  - Total: 15,235
  - Density: 196.9/km^{2} (509.9/sq mi)
- Time zone: UTC+01:00 (CET)
  - Summer (DST): UTC+02:00 (CEST)
- Vehicle registration: GF
- Website: Isenbuettel.de

Samtgemeinde Isenbüttel is a Samtgemeinde in the district of Gifhorn, in Lower Saxony, Germany. It is situated approximately 4 km southeast of Gifhorn. 15,502 citizens are living in the Samtgemeinde Isenbüttel.

== Structure of the Samtgemeinde Isenbüttel ==
The Samtgemeinde is made up of the following village administrations Calberlah, Isenbüttel, Ribbesbüttel und Wasbüttel. The administration office is in Isenbüttel

The 4 member communities with their associated villages and smaller villages
Municipality	Population (Main Office) (31. Dez 2005)	Area (in km²)	Density (in Population./km²)	Villages
Calberlah	5.221	27,64	189	Allenbüttel, Allerbüttel, Brunsbüttel, Calberlah, Edesbüttel, Jelpke, Wettmershagen
Isenbüttel	6.212	18,65	333	Bornsiek, Isenbüttel, Tankumsee
Ribbesbüttel	2.138	24,51	187	Ausbüttel, Ribbesbüttel, Vollbüttel
Wasbüttel	1.962	24,51	80	Wasbüttel
