= Iosif Hodoșiu =

Romanian historian, politician, lawyer and publisher

Iosif Hodoş
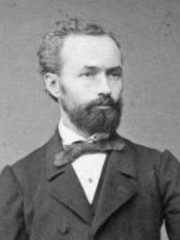
- Iosif Hodoş
- Born: Iosif Hodoş; October 20, 1829; Bandu de Câmpie, Mureș
- Died: December 9, 1880 (aged 51); Sibiu
- Occupations: Historian, lawyer, publicist, and politician

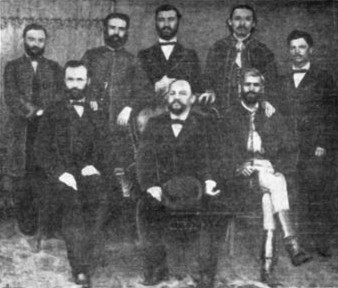
On the chairs: Iosif Hodoş, deputy committee, deputy of Brad; Ioan Pipoș, supreme committee, Sigismund Borlea, protonotary, deputy of Hălmagiu. Standing: Ioan Moțiu, court county; George Secula, deputy notary, tax comitatens; Ioan Francu, tax; comitatens, Haralambie Munteanu, notary at the county; Ioan Coșeriu, advisor. Missing: Amoș Frâncu (senior), vice-committee.

Iosif Hodoș (alternatively spelled Hodoșiu; 20 October 1829, Bandu de Câmpie, Mureș – 28 November/9 December 1880, Sibiu) was a Romanian historian, politician, lawyer, and publisher. He was a founding member of the Romanian Academy.

He married Ana Balint, the daughter of Simion Balint (1810 – 1880), a descendant of one of the noble priest families of Vima Mică, prefect of the Arieș Legion and Romanian revolutionary alongside Avram Iancu. He had three children: Enea, Alexandru and Nerva.

== Study period ==
Together with his brother Zaheu Hodoș, his cousin, Alexandru Papiu Ilarian and the brothers Radu and Nicolae Popea, the students at the Piarist Academic High School in Cluj, he participated in organizing a reading society which "by cultivating the Romanian language and other cultural instruments aimed at preparing the political emancipation of our nation."

Iosif Hodoș studied law in Italy, in Padua with Alexandru Papiu Ilarian and Simion Bărnuțiu. They went through a difficult financial situations and the one who helped them, as he could, was the Priest Simion Balint who was very happy when, in January 1854, they manage to get their PhD.

"No one (perhaps not even Papiu and Hodoș) enjoyed their success more sincerely than the good Father Balint from Roșia Montană, who wrote them an epistle on January 21, 1854, to show them how happy he would be the Romanian nation of the high title they had won."
— Alexandru Marcu, Simion Bărnuțiu, Al. Papiu Ilarian and Iosif Hodoș studying in Italy, p.115.

== Political activity ==
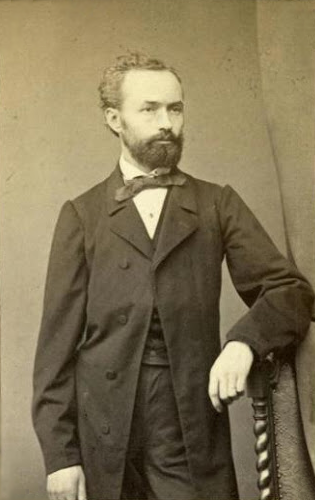
Diet of Budapest

Iosif Hodoș has stood out through his political activity. In 1848, when he was only 19 years old, being entrusted to him the vice-prefecture of Zarand county, he participated in all the national, political and cultural acts of the county. He was elected general secretary of the national assembly on The Field of Liberty, of 3–5 May 1848. As a deputy in the Hungarian diet of Pest, he supported the autonomy and integrity of Transylvania for which he was congratulated by the people of Brașov, Craiova, Bucharest and by those from the Sibiu Academy of Rights.

His love for his country inflamed him as much as his father-in-law Simion Balint. This can be seen from the political activity they both carried out, fighting for the rights of Romanians in Transylvania, as well as from some small but still significant deeds. Thus in the letter of November 25, 1858, sent from Vienna to those at home in Roșia, Iosif Hodoș and Simion Balint show that he was waiting to go in audience to the emperor, who was gone, then Balint writes: ...but the ugly so they realized that we think we won't get out of here ... we can barely get to our polenta once again.

In 1869 and 1878, for three terms, Iosif Hodoș was a member of the Budapest Parliament.

He was one of the founding members of the Romanian Literary Society, a society that would later become the Romanian Academy. He was the general secretary of the Romanian Academy until his death. As a member of the Romanian Academy, Iosif Hodoș has made a report Literature and Fine Arts in 1868.

He published in Pesta, in 1871, the law study entitled Romanians and the Constitution of Transylvania (Românii și constituția Transilvaniei). On behalf of the Romanian Academy, he translated and edited the works of Dimitrie Cantemir Descriptio Moldaviae and The history of the Ottoman Empire. In 1861, he collaborated with The Carpathian Magazine (Revista Carpaților) edited by Gheorghe Sion and in The Paper for the Mind, Heart and Literature (Foaie pentru minte, inimă şi literatură). He was invited to occupy the department of Romanian language and literature at the Academy of Iași.

== See also ==
- Alexandru Papiu Ilarian
- Simion Bărnuțiu
