= Ion Gorun =

Austrian-born Romanian writer

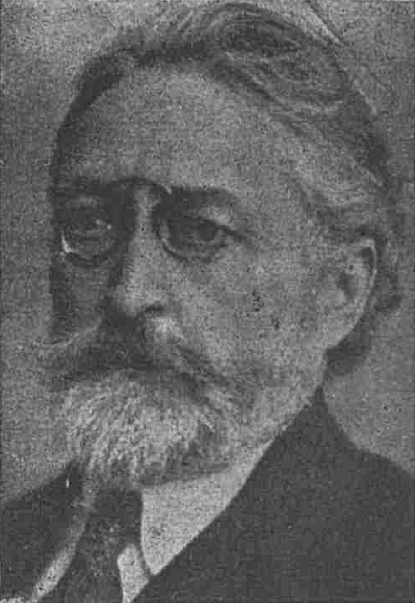
- Ion Gorun (1)
- Born: 1863 Roșia, Sibiu County
- Died: 1928 (aged 64–65)
- Occupation: Poet, Prose Writer, Translator

Ion Gorun (pen name of Alexandru I. Hodoș; December 30, 1863–March 30, 1928) was an Austrian Empire-born Romanian prose writer, poet and translator.

== Biography ==
Born in Roșia, Sibiu County, his parents were Iosif Hodoș and his wife Ana (née Balint). His brothers Enea and Nerva were both writers, as was his wife Constanța; his uncle was Alexandru Papiu Ilarian. He attended high school at Brașov and Sibiu between 1876 and 1880. Subsequently crossing into the Romanian Old Kingdom, he entered the medical faculty of the University of Bucharest, taking classes from 1881 to 1883 before withdrawing and enrolling in the literature faculty, where he graduated in 1888, and the law faculty, which he did not complete. He became an editor for the National Liberal Party-affiliated magazine Națiunea and was editing secretary for Vieața (1893-1894) and Povestea vorbei (1896-1897). He headed Viața nouă magazine in 1898, and edited the Arad-based Românul. He edited Pagini literare magazine from 1899 to 1900; together with Artur Stavri, edited Viața literară și artistică (1906-1908); with George Coșbuc, Revista noastră, briefly in 1907; with Constanța Hodoș, Astra (1915-1918) and Războiul popoarelor (1914-1916). His work appeared in Sămănătorul, Vatra and Fântâna Blanduziei.

His first published verses appeared in 1889, in Convorbiri Literare, under the pen name Castor; his first newspaper work ran in Poporul; his first book was the 1901 poetry collection Câteva versuri. His prose books were Alb și negru (1902), Robinson în Țara Românească (1904), Lume necăjită (1911) and Obraze și măști (1922). He authored a monograph about Alexandru Vlahuță. Authors he translated include Johann Wolfgang von Goethe, August Strindberg, Alexandre Dumas and Karl May; he also gave a Romanian version of Immanuel Kant's "Perpetual Peace: A Philosophical Sketch". In 1926, he was awarded the national prize for prose.
