= Iernut Power Station =

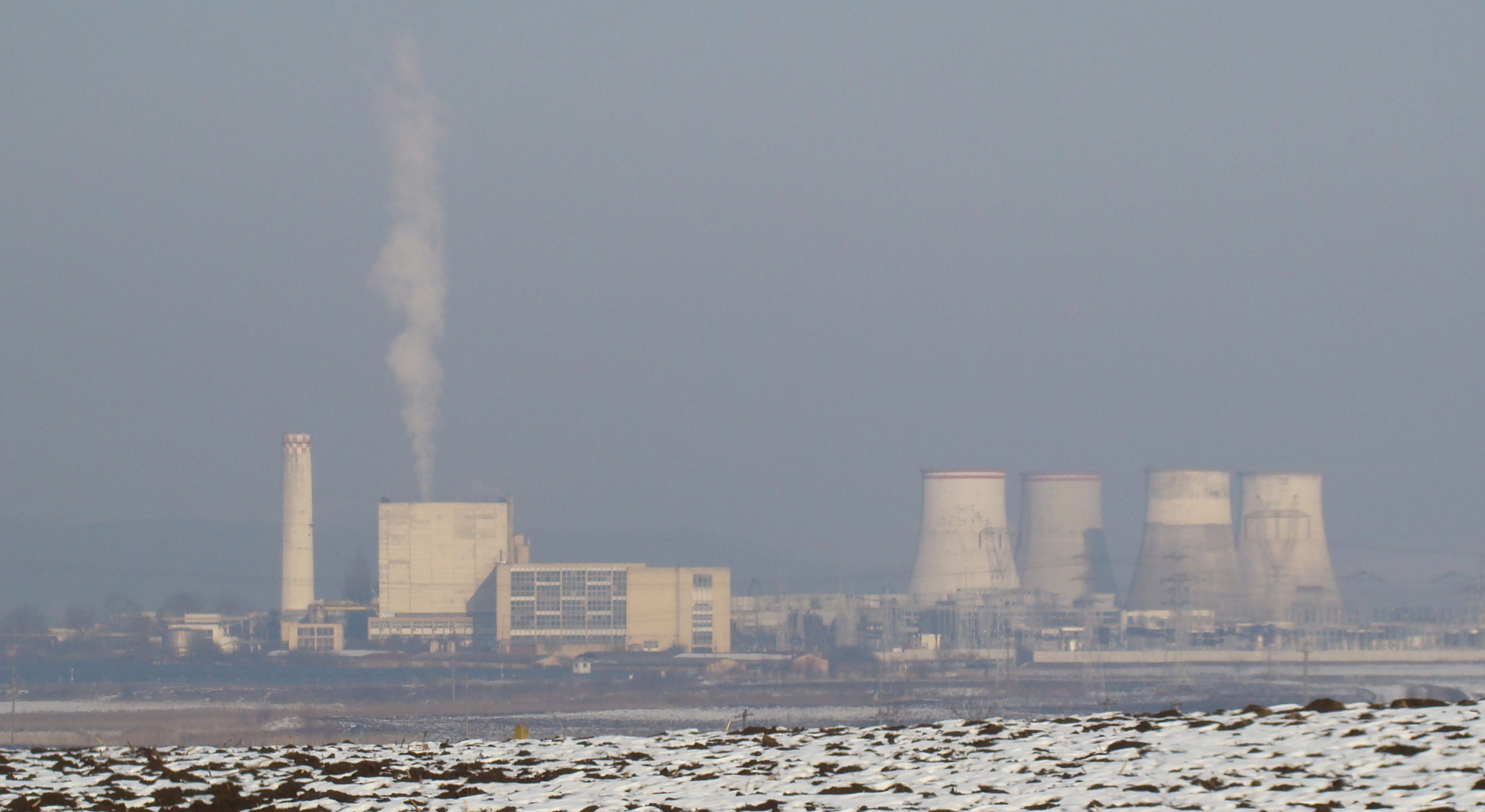
- Country: Romania
- Location: Iernut, Mureș County
- Coordinates: 46°28′02″N 24°11′17″E
- Owner: Romgaz

Thermal power station
- Primary fuel: Natural gas

Power generation
- Units operational: 1 x 200 MW; 1 x 100 MW (mothballed)
- Units under const.: 1 x 430 MW
- Units decommissioned: 3 x 100 MW; 1 x 200 MW
- Nameplate capacity: 300 MW
- Capacity factor: 200

The Iernut Power Station is a thermal power plant located in Iernut, Mureș County, Romania, having 2 generation groups, one of 100 MW and one group of 200, having a total electricity generation capacity of 300 MW.

In 2007, a contract was signed with Austrian company Verbund for the installation of a seventh electricity generation group of 400 MW at a total cost of US$375 million that will increase the installed capacity of the power plant to 1,200 MW.

The powerplant is set to be expanded with a new group of 430 MW.

In 2012 the power station was acquired by Romgaz in quantum of the accumulated debt of 150 million euro by the previous owner company, Electrocentrale București.

== Operations ==
Unit	Capacity (MW)	Commissioned	Status
Iernut - 1	100		decommissioned
Iernut - 2	100		decommissioned
Iernut - 3	100		decommissioned
Iernut - 4	100		mothballed
Iernut - 5	200		operational
Iernut - 6	200		decommissioned
Iernut - 7	430		in construction
