= Papiu Ilarian =

Papiu Ilarian Mezőbodon
- Commune
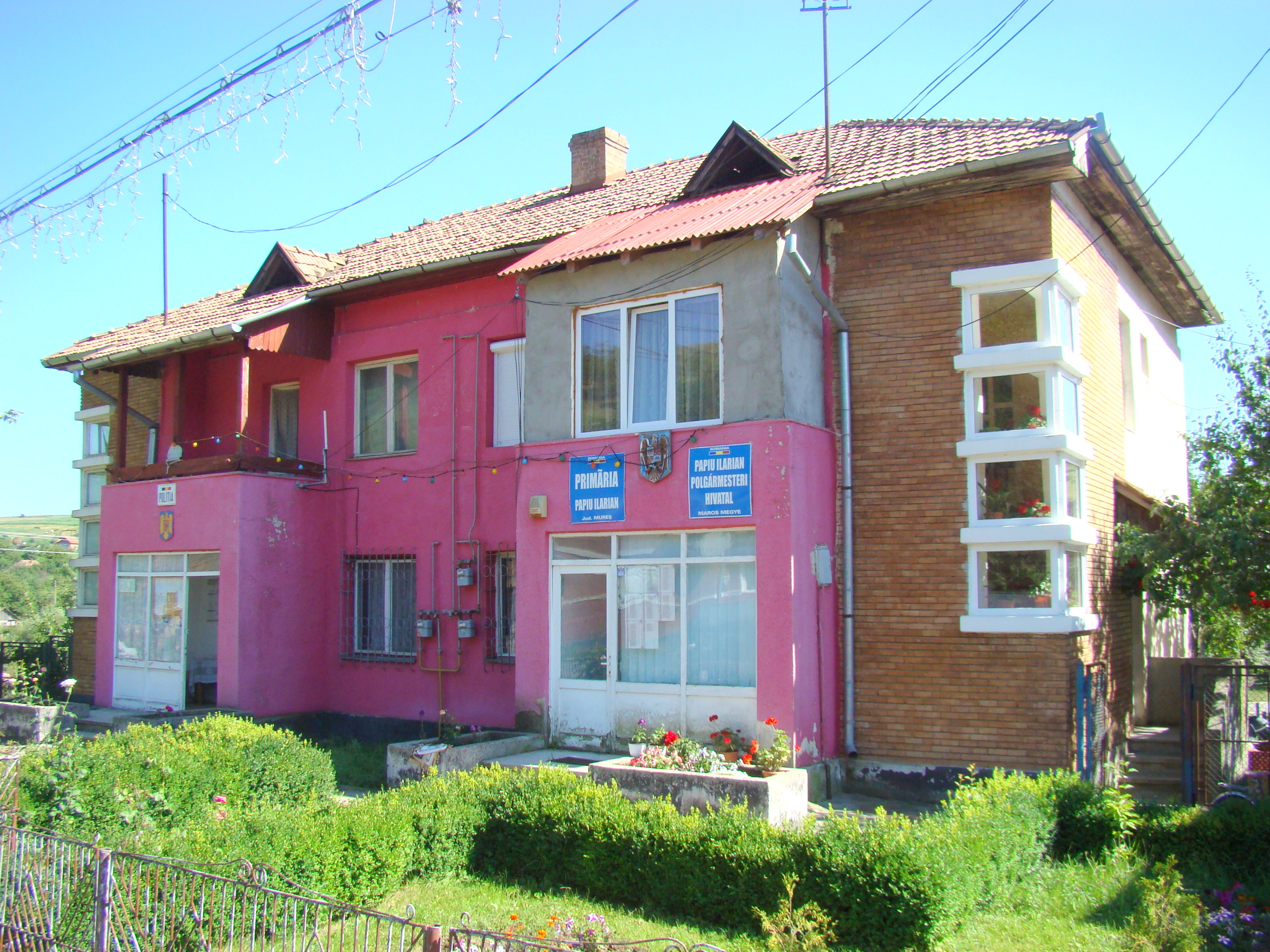
- Papiu Ilarian town hall

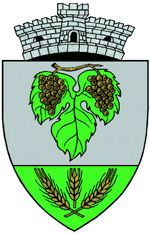
- Coat of arms

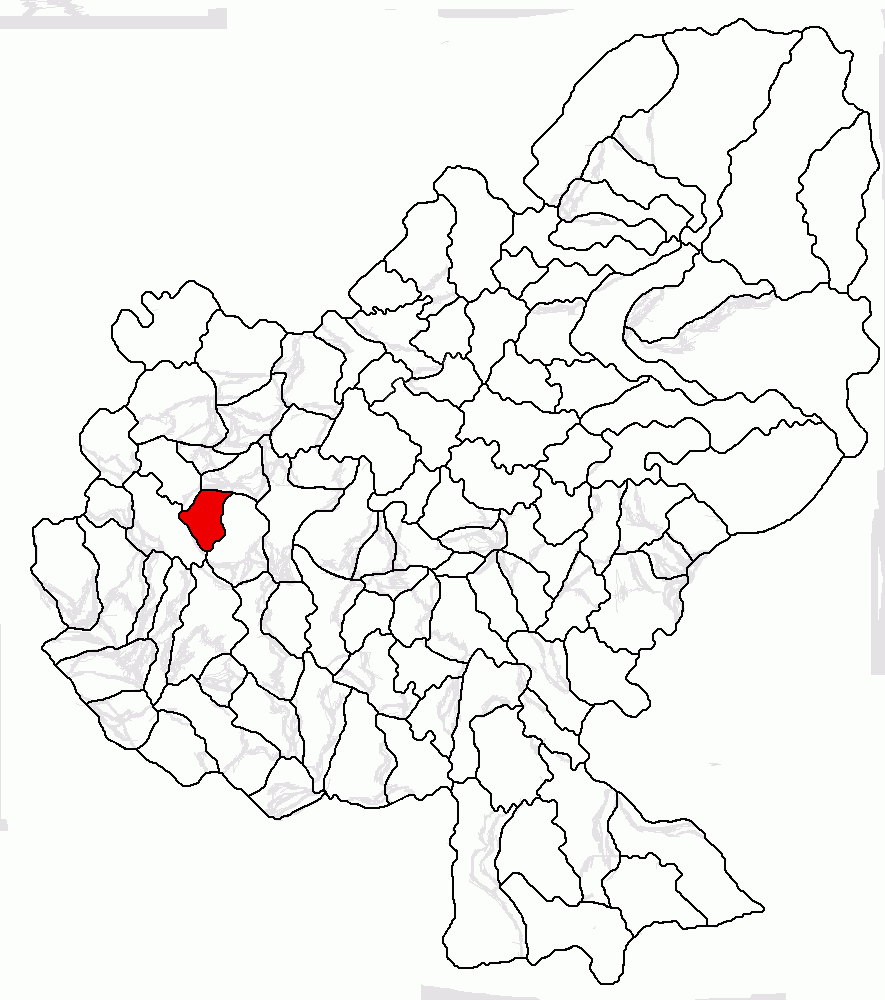
- Location in Mureș County

- Location in Romania
- Coordinates: 46°33′N 24°12′E
- Country: Romania
- County: Mureș

Government
  - Mayor (2020–2024): Levente Varó (UDMR)
- Area: 26.09 km^{2} (10.07 sq mi)
- Elevation: 361 m (1,184 ft)
- Population (2021-12-01): 827
  - Density: 31.7/km^{2} (82.1/sq mi)
- Time zone: UTC+02:00 (EET)
  - Summer (DST): UTC+03:00 (EEST)
- Postal code: 547445
- Area code: (+40) 0265
- Vehicle reg.: MS
- Website: comunapapiuilarian.ro

Papiu Ilarian (formerly Budiul de Câmpie; Hungarian: Mezőbodon [ˈmɛzøːbodon]) is a commune in Mureș County, Transylvania, Romania composed of five villages: Dobra (Dobratanya), Merișoru (Bugusalja), Papiu Ilarian, Șandru (Sándortelep), and Ursoaia (Urszajatelep).

Its first written mention is from 1332 as Budun (Bodon). The prefix "Mező", meaning 'field', in its Hungarian name refers to the Mezőség subregion where it lies. Romanian politician Alexandru Papiu Ilarian grew up in Budiul de Câmpie, and the commune was named after him in 1925.

The commune is situated on the Transylvanian Plateau, at an altitude of 361 m (1,184 ft), on the banks of the river Icland. It is located in the western part of the county, 37 km (23 mi) from the county seat, Târgu Mureș.

== Demographics ==
Historical population
Year	Pop.	±%
1850	1,209	—
1880	1,241	+2.6%
1890	1,297	+4.5%
1900	1,369	+5.6%
1910	1,552	+13.4%
1920	1,349	−13.1%
1930	1,629	+20.8%
1941	1,949	+19.6%
1956	2,193	+12.5%
1966	2,036	−7.2%
1977	1,434	−29.6%
2002	1,013	−29.4%
2011	963	−4.9%
2021	827	−14.1%
Source: Census data

The commune has a Hungarian majority. According to the 2002 census, it has a population of 1,013, of which 56.17% were Hungarians and 42.84% Romanians. At the 2021 census, Papiu Ilarian had 827 inhabitants, 57.19% of whom were Hungarians and 41.23% Romanians.

== See also ==
- List of Hungarian exonyms (Mureș County)
