= Ogra =

- Commune
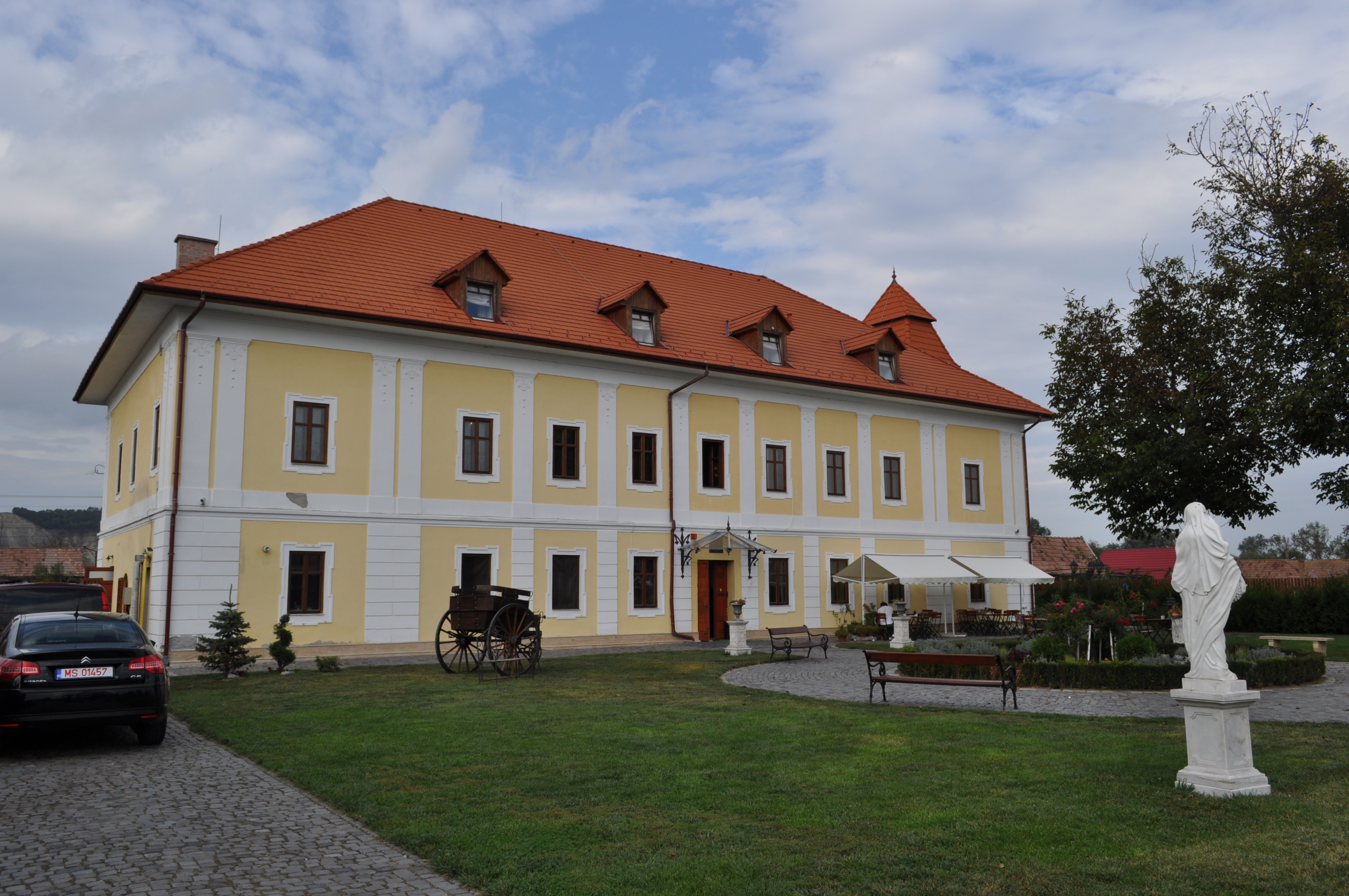
- Haller Castle

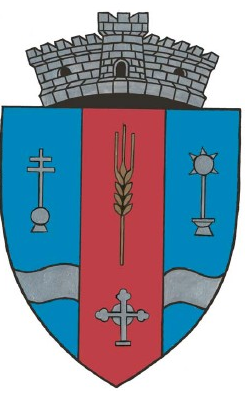
- Coat of arms

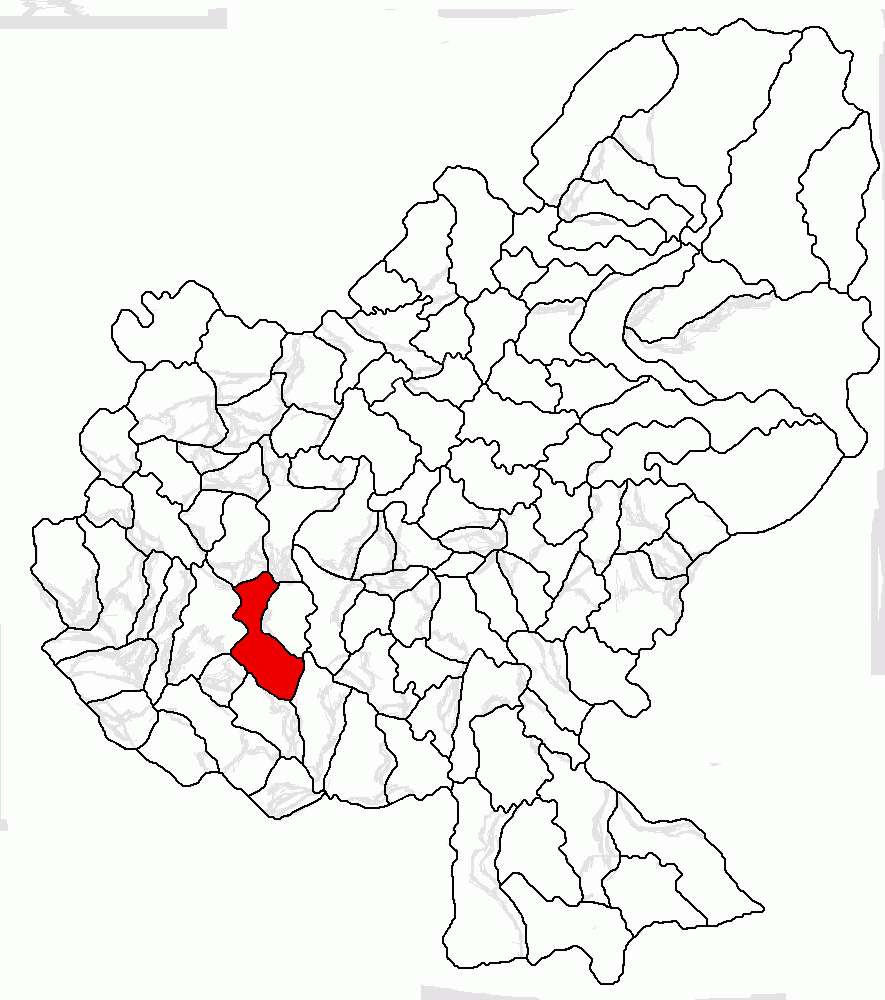
- Location in Mureș County

- Location in Romania
- Coordinates: 46°26′N 24°19′E
- Country: Romania
- County: Mureș

Government
  - Mayor (2024–2028): Teodor Neacșa (PSD)
- Area: 52.17 km^{2} (20.14 sq mi)
- Elevation: 329 m (1,079 ft)
- Population (2021-12-01): 2,442
  - Density: 46.81/km^{2} (121.2/sq mi)
- Time zone: UTC+02:00 (EET)
  - Summer (DST): UTC+03:00 (EEST)
- Postal code: 547440
- Area code: +40 x59
- Vehicle reg.: MS
- Website: primariaogra.ro

Ogra (Hungarian: Marosugra or colloquially Ugra, pronounced: [ˈmɒroʃuɡrɒ]) is a commune in Mureș County, Transylvania, Romania. It is composed of five villages: Dileu Vechi (Oláhdellő), Giuluș (Gyulas), Lăscud (Lackod), Ogra, and Vaideiu (Mezőújfalu).

The commune is on the Transylvanian Plateau, on the banks of the Mureș River. It is in the southwestern part of the county, 22 km (14 mi) from the county seat, Târgu Mureș. The A3 motorway connects Ogra to Brașov (Cristian), 160.1 km (99.5 mi) to the southeast and Cluj-Napoca (Gilău), 89.7 km (55.7 mi) to the northwest. The Târgu Mureș International Airport is 8.7 km (5.4 mi) to the east.

As of the 2011 census, the commune had a population of 2,387, of which 45.3% were Romanians, 29.2% Roma, and 21.3% Hungarians. At the 2021 census, Ogra had a population of 2,442; of those, 40.46% were Roma, 33.7% Romanians, and 15.85% Hungarians.

Haller Castle was originally built in the seventeenth century, although most of the current building dates from the eighteenth and nineteenth centuries, and is Post-Baroque. It was nationalized by the Communist authorities in 1949, and served for a while as a school and then town hall; since 2011 it functions as a hotel and restaurant.

The Ogra mine is a large salt mine in the commune.

== See also ==
- List of Hungarian exonyms (Mureș County)
