= Enea Hodoș =

Romanian philologist

Enea Hodoș (Romanian pronunciation: [ˈene̯a ˈhodoʃ]; December 31, 1858 – July 25, 1945) was an Imperial Austrian-born Romanian prose writer and folklorist.

Born in Roșia Montană, Alba County, in the Transylvania region, his parents were Iosif Hodoș and his wife Ana (née Balint). His brothers Alexandru "Ion Gorun" and Nerva were both writers. He attended primary and secondary school in his native village, at Baia de Criș, Brad, Brașov and Blaj. He studied medicine at the University of Vienna, but did not graduate; and took literature and philosophy at Vienna and Budapest. At Sibiu, he taught in the Astra civil school for girls and, from 1886 to 1888, belonged to the group around Tribuna newspaper.

Beginning in 1899, he taught Romanian, Hungarian and history at the Caransebeș pedagogical institute in the Banat region. While there, he put together a collection of representative local folklore. His interest in the subject had existed since childhood, when he read Vasile Alecsandri's anthology, given to his father by the author. While a student in Brașov, his teacher Ioan Alexandru Lapedatu spoke about folk songs; another teacher, Ioan Micu Moldovan, offered a more practical example. Thus, together with his pupils, Hodoș would spend school vacations gathering folk poetry. He retired, seemingly by force, in 1905, and became an editor of Telegraful Român. Hodoș worked on the Sibiu newspaper until his death, aside from a temporary return to teaching, at Sighet between 1919 and 1920 (by which time his native province had united with Romania). In 1904, he was elected a corresponding member of the Romanian Academy. His published debut in the Blaj typewritten magazine Filomela in 1876. Publications to which he contributed include Amicul familiei, Aurora română din Cernăuți, Convorbiri Literare, Familia, Foaia ilustrată, Foaia diecezană, Luceafărul and Tribuna. His Schițe umoristice ("Humorous Sketches") appeared in 1897, and he translated from Ivan Turgenev.
