= Hodo Gap =

Coordinates: 32.8437°N 84.6297°W

Hodo Gap is a gap in the U.S. state of Georgia.

Hodo Gap was named after one Mr. Hodo, a local trader.
