= Calberlah =

- Municipality
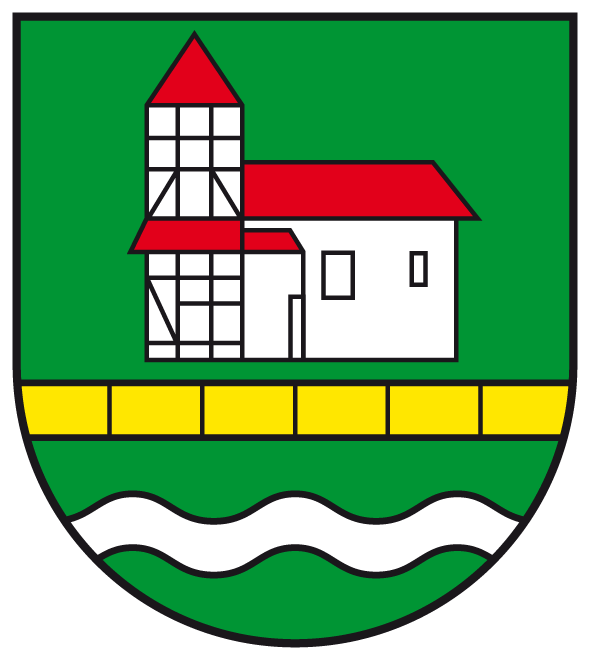
- Coat of arms

- Location of Calberlah within Gifhorn district
- Interactive map of Calberlah
- Location within Germany Location within Lower Saxony
- Coordinates: 52°25′29″N 10°36′59″E
- Country: Germany
- State: Lower Saxony
- District: Gifhorn
- Municipal assoc.: Isenbüttel
- Subdivisions: 7 Ortsteile

Government
  - Mayor: Jochen Gese

Area
  - Total: 27.64 km^{2} (10.67 sq mi)
- Elevation: 67 m (220 ft)

Population (2025-12-31)
  - Total: 5,251
  - Density: 190.0/km^{2} (492.0/sq mi)
- Time zone: UTC+01:00 (CET)
  - Summer (DST): UTC+02:00 (CEST)
- Postal codes: 38547
- Dialling codes: 05374
- Vehicle registration: GF

Calberlah is a municipality in the district of Gifhorn, in Lower Saxony, Germany. The Municipality Calberlah includes the villages of Allenbüttel, Allerbüttel, Brunsbüttel, Calberlah, Edesbüttel, Jelpke and Wettmershagen.

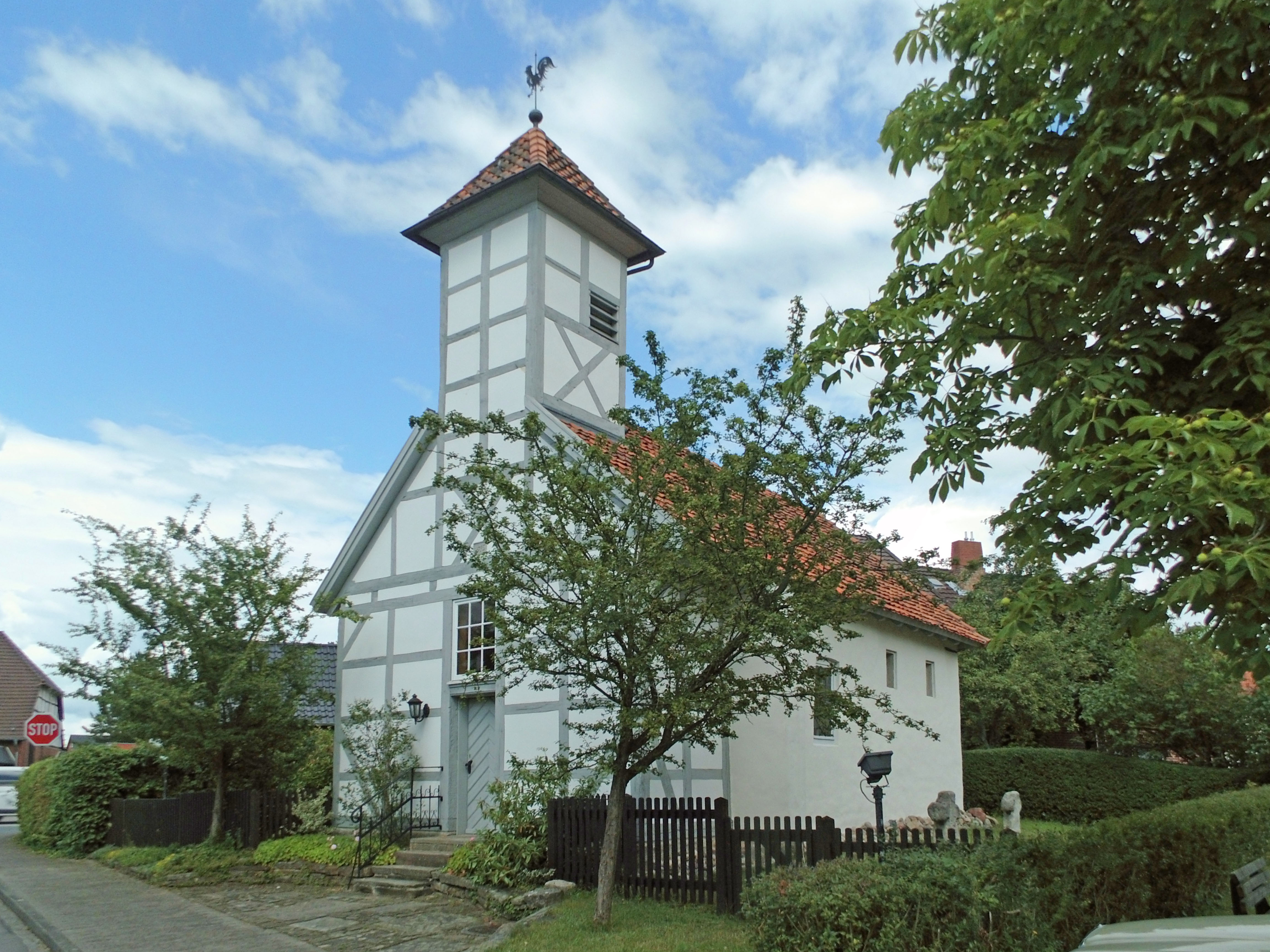
Lutheran chapel
