= Hodo, Inc. =

American tofu and plant-based food company

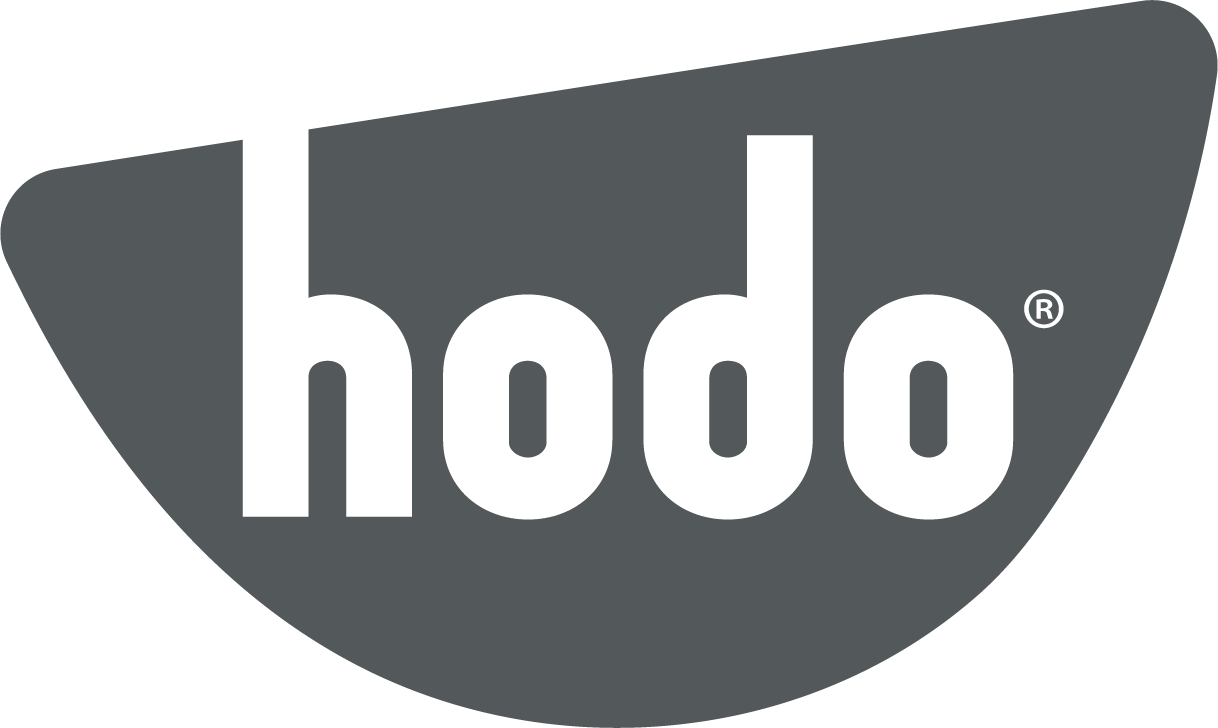
- Trade name: Hodo
- Company type: Subsidiary
- Industry: Food processing, Plant-based foods
- Founded: 2004
- Founder: Minh Tsai
- Headquarters: Oakland, CA, U.S.
- Area served: United States
- Key people: Ryo Tsutsumi (CEO)
- Products: Tofu, yuba, plant-based meat alternatives, plant-based egg alternatives
- Number of employees: ~130 (2021)
- Parent: Calbee Group
- Website: hodofoods.com

Hodo is an American tofu and plant-based food company based in Oakland, California.

== History ==
Minh Tsai founded Hodo in 2004 after starting the business at Bay Area farmers' markets, including the Palo Alto Farmers Market and the Ferry Plaza Farmers Market.

By 2017, Hodo's tofu was being sold in grocery chains and independent supermarkets across the United States, and it was appearing on the menus of Bay Area restaurants including State Bird Provisions, SingleThread, Slanted Door, Mister Jiu's, and Burma Superstar.

== Products ==
Hodo makes tofu, yuba, and other plant-based foods. Foodwise says the company also makes plant-based meat and egg alternatives such as Thai Curry Nuggets, Mexican Crumbles, and the All-Day Egg Scramble.

== Recognition ==
In 2019, Epicurious included Hodo in a roundup of tofu brands recommended by chefs. In that article, chef Denise St. Onge of Greens Restaurant in San Francisco said that Bay Area restaurateurs source Hodo's tofu and yuba for its flavor and texture.

The Kitchn included Hodo Firm Tofu in its plant-based grocery recommendations in 2021 and 2022.

== Ownership ==
In September 2025, Calbee acquired a majority stake in Hodo Inc.
