= Hehlenriede =

River in Germany

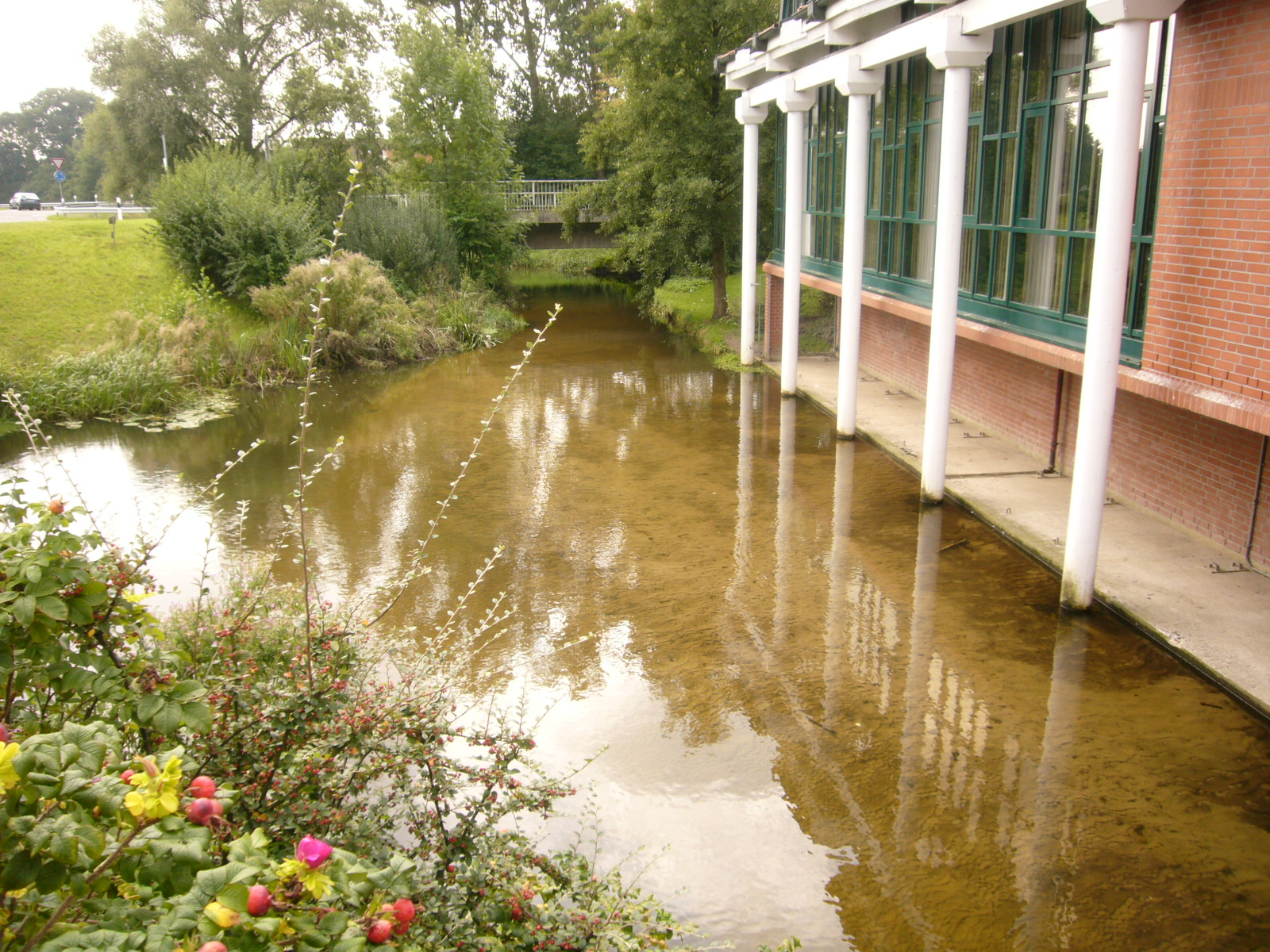

Location
- Country: Germany
- States: Lower Saxony

Physical characteristics
- Source
  - location: Wedelheine
  - elevation: c. 72 meters above sea level
- Mouth
  - location: Aller Canal
  - coordinates: 52.4574°N 10.5026°E
  - elevation: c. 55 meters above sea level
- Length: approximately 12.9 km

Basin features
- Progression: Aller Canal→ Aller→ Weser→ North Sea

The Hehlenriede is a river of Lower Saxony, Germany. It flows into the Aller Canal near Gifhorn.

Investigations by the TU Braunschweig have shown that the area is particularly at risk of floods in case of continuous rain for around an entire day.

The Lower Saxony Water Quality Report from 2004 rates the chemical pollution of the Hehlenriede stream as moderate along almost its entire length. The NLWKN's 2017 water quality map classifies its ecological potential as poor.

== See also ==
- List of rivers of Lower Saxony
