= Alexandru Papiu Ilarian =

Romanian revolutionary, lawyer and historian

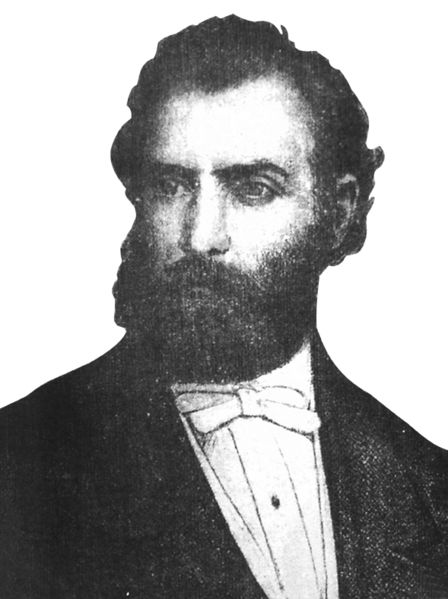

Minister of Justice of the United Romanian Principalities
- In office 11 October 1863 – 27 February 1864
- Prime Minister: Mihail Kogălniceanu
- Preceded by: Dimitrie P. Vioreanu
- Succeeded by: Petre Orbescu

Personal details
- Born: December 27, 1827 Bezded, Austrian Empire
- Died: October 23, 1877 (aged 49) Sibiu, Austria-Hungary
- Resting place: Church between the Fir trees, Sibiu, Romania
- Education: University of Vienna; University of Padua

Alexandru Papiu-Ilarian (27 September 1827 – 23 October [O.S. 11 October] 1877) was a Romanian revolutionary, lawyer and historian.

Papiu Ilarian was born in Bezded (Hungarian: Bezdédtelek), Kingdom of Hungary (today part of Gârbou, Romania) on 27 September 1827. His father was the Greek-Catholic priest Ioan Bucur Pop, also a Romanian revolutionary, who was executed at Turda (Torda) by hanging, at 54 years old, by the Hungarian authorities in March 1849. In 1832 he moved with his family to Budiu de Câmpie (Mezőbodon), near Târgu Mureș (Marosvásárhely), the native village of his father, where he attended primary school. In the autumn of 1838 he entered the Catholic secondary school in Târgu Mureș. He finished high school in Cluj (Kolozsvár) and obtained a doctorate of laws at the University of Padua. He was active in the Hungarian Revolution of 1848.

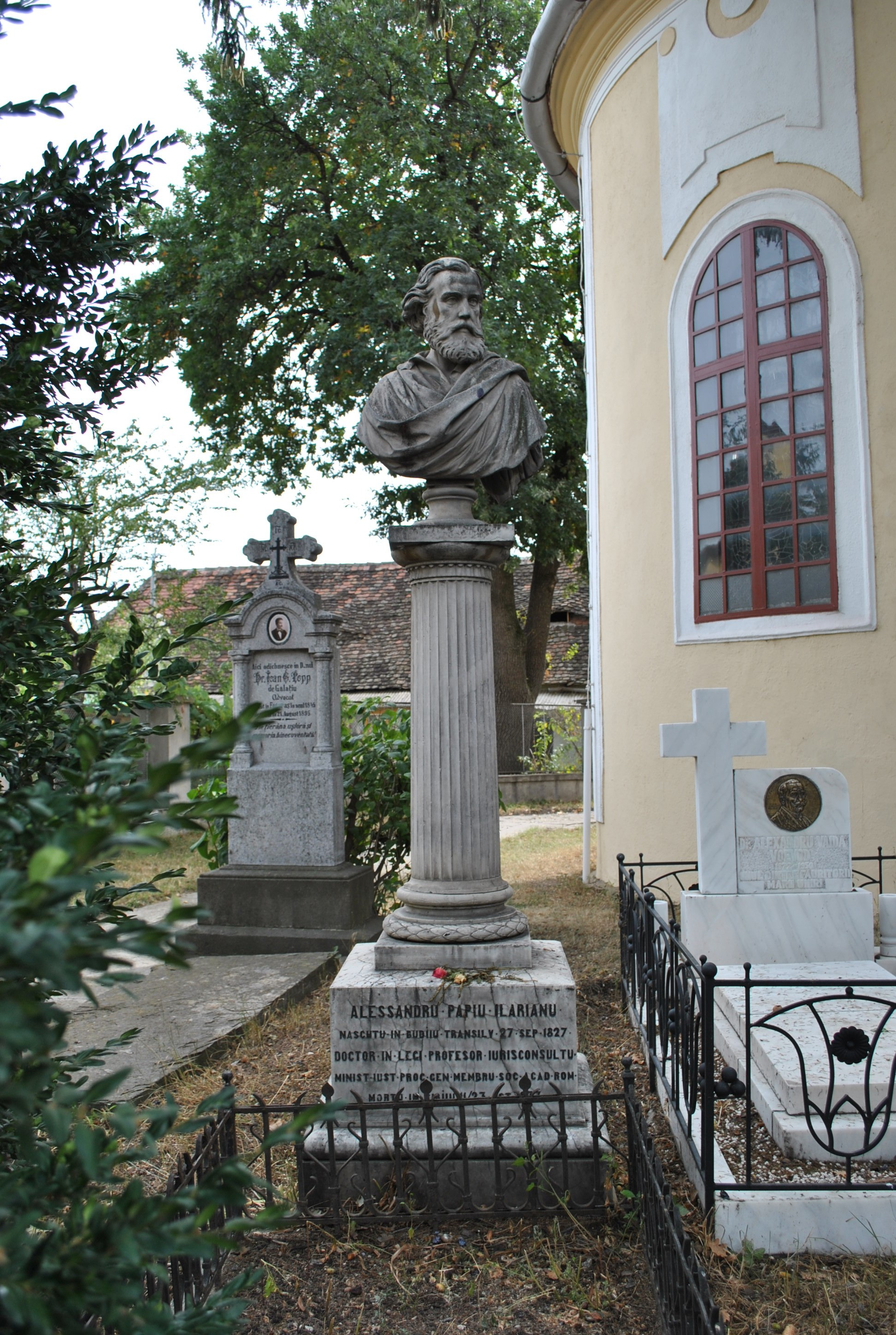
Grave of Papiu Ilarian in Sibiu

He was a founder and president of the Transylvania Society, between 1867 and 1874. He was elected to the Romanian Academy in 1868. As member of the Bar in Bucharest, he pleaded in court the case of the oxcart drivers from Giurgiu, in 1873. He died in Sibiu (Nagyszeben) on 23 October 1877, and is buried at the Church between the Fir trees.

Budiul de Câmpie commune was renamed Papiu Ilarian in 1925. The Alexandru Papiu Ilarian National College in Târgu Mureș as well as high schools in Dej and Zalău are named after him.
