= Iclănzel =

- Commune
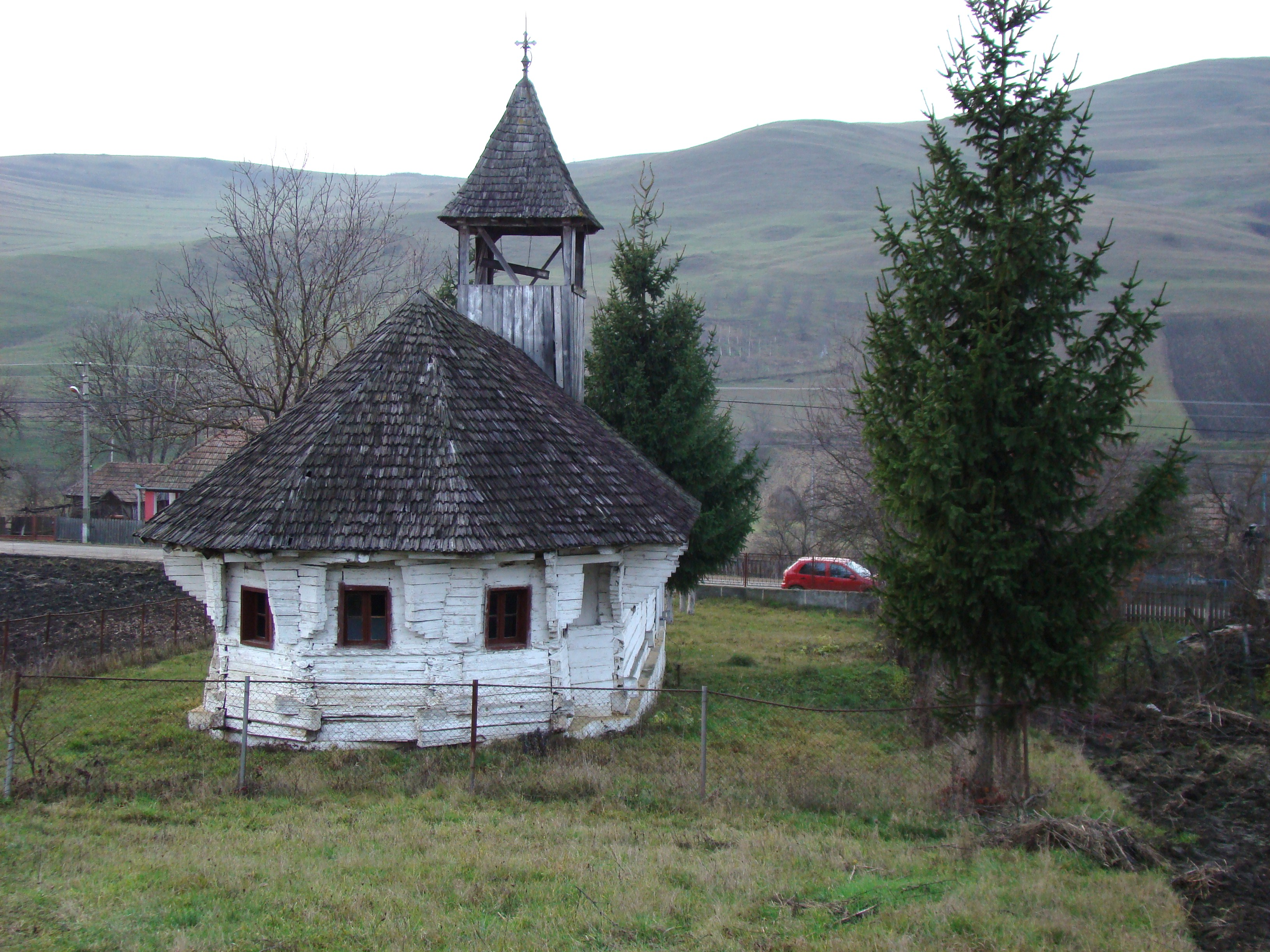
- Wooden church in Mădărășeni

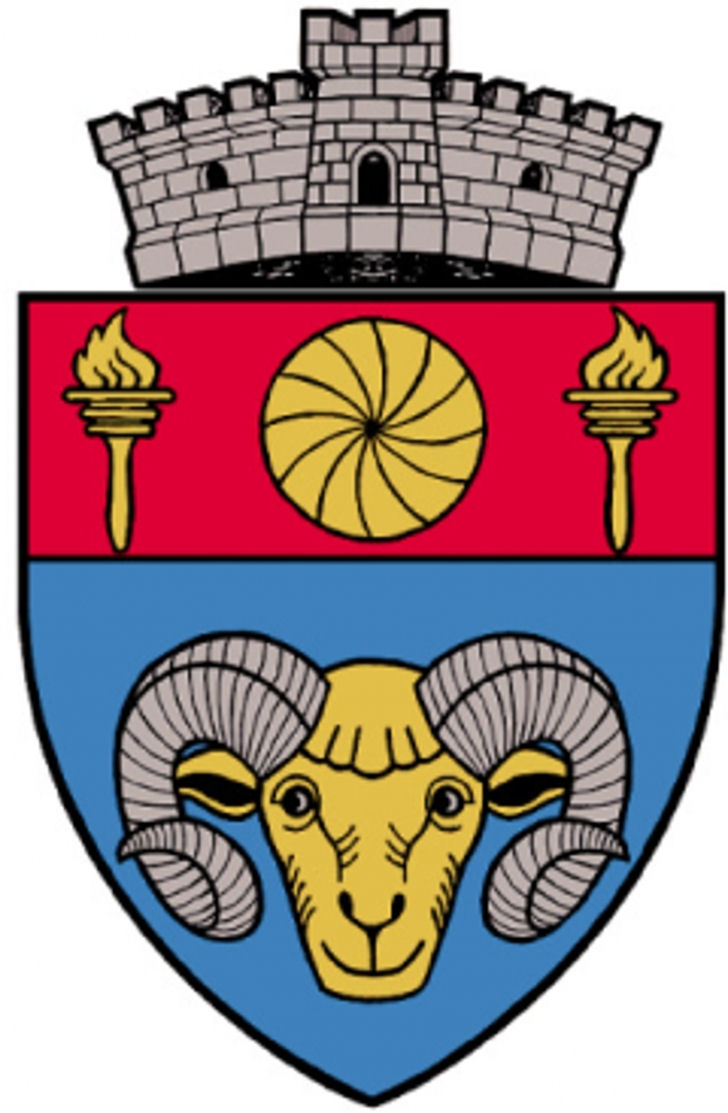
- Coat of arms

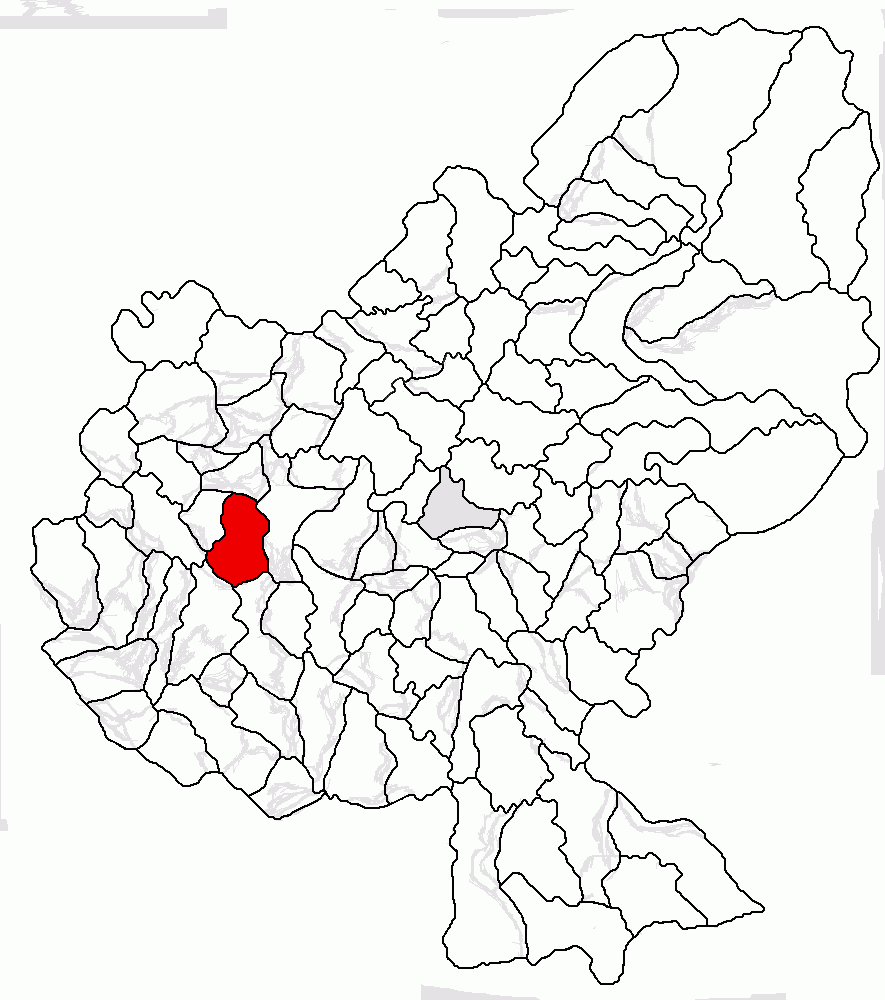
- Location in Mureș County

- Location in Romania
- Coordinates: 46°32′N 24°17′E
- Country: Romania
- County: Mureș

Government
  - Mayor (2020–2024): Nicolae Banea (PSD)
- Area: 61.81 km^{2} (23.86 sq mi)
- Elevation: 305 m (1,001 ft)
- Population (2021-12-01): 1,902
  - Density: 30.77/km^{2} (79.70/sq mi)
- Time zone: UTC+02:00 (EET)
  - Summer (DST): UTC+03:00 (EEST)
- Postal code: 547340
- Area code: (+40) 0265
- Vehicle reg.: MS
- Website: comunaiclanzel.ro

Iclănzel (Hungarian: Kisikland, Hungarian pronunciation: [ˈkiʃiklɒnd]) is a commune in Mureș County, Transylvania, Romania. It is composed of eleven villages: Căpușu de Câmpie (Mezőkapus), Chisălița (Tyiszelica), După Deal (Völgyön-túl), Fânațe (Szénafű), Fânațele Căpușului (Úriszénafű), Ghidașteu (Gidástó), Iclandu Mare (Nagyikland), Iclănzel, Mădărășeni (Hirtopa), Tăblășeni (Lekenceiforduló), and Valea Iclandului (Iklándivölgy).

Historical population
Year	Pop.	±%
1850	2,330	—
1920	3,296	+41.5%
1956	4,832	+46.6%
2002	2,292	−52.6%
2011	2,126	−7.2%
2021	1,902	−10.5%
Source: Census data

At the 2021 census, the commune had a populatiom of 1,902; of those 90.75% were Romanians, 2.52% Hungarians, and 2.21% Roma.

== See also ==
- List of Hungarian exonyms (Mureș County)
