= Șincai =

Șincai Mezősámsond
- Commune
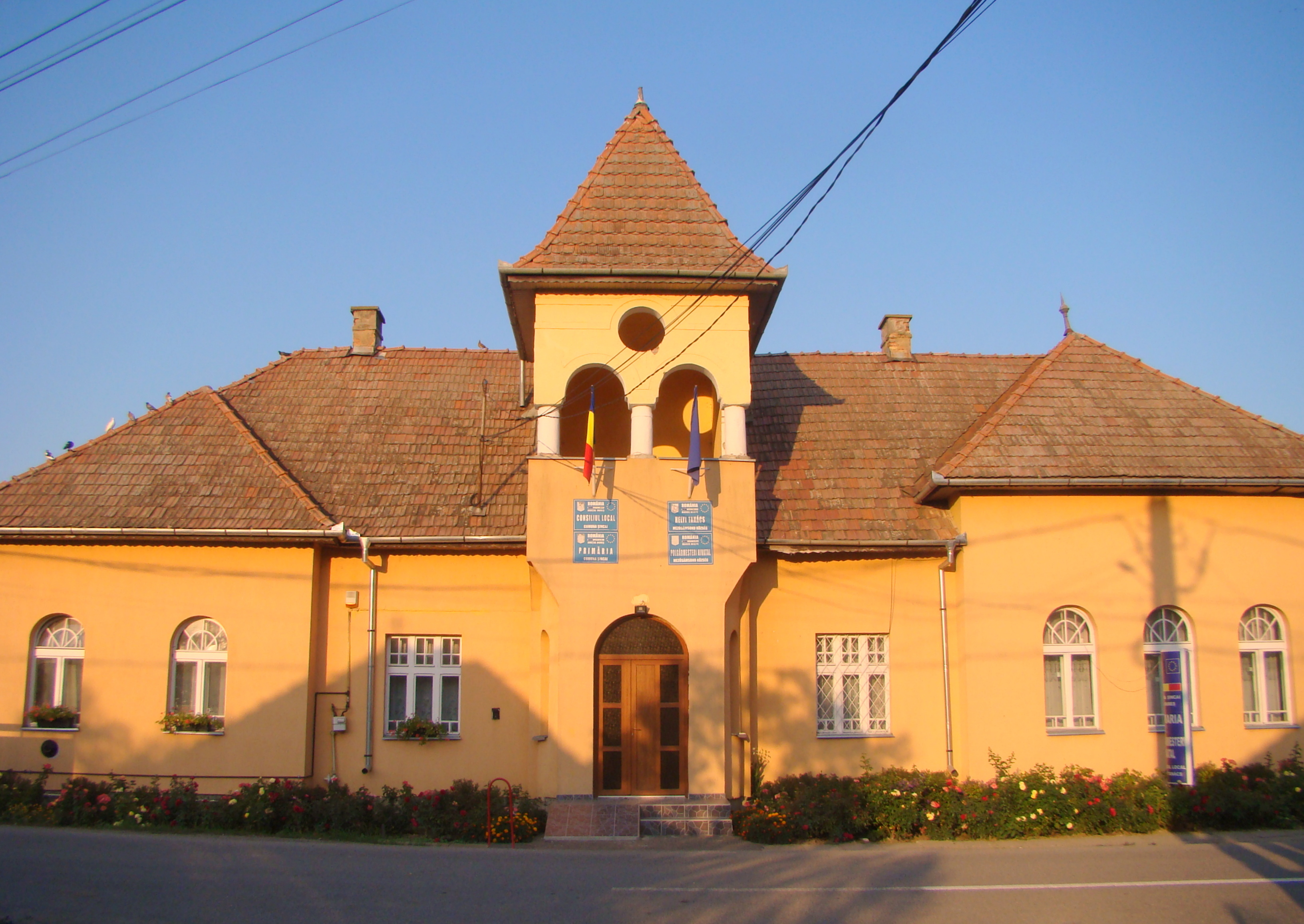
- Șincai town hall

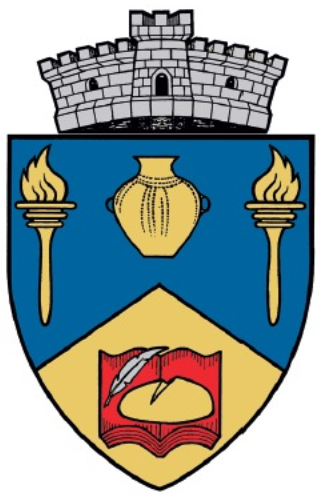
- Coat of arms

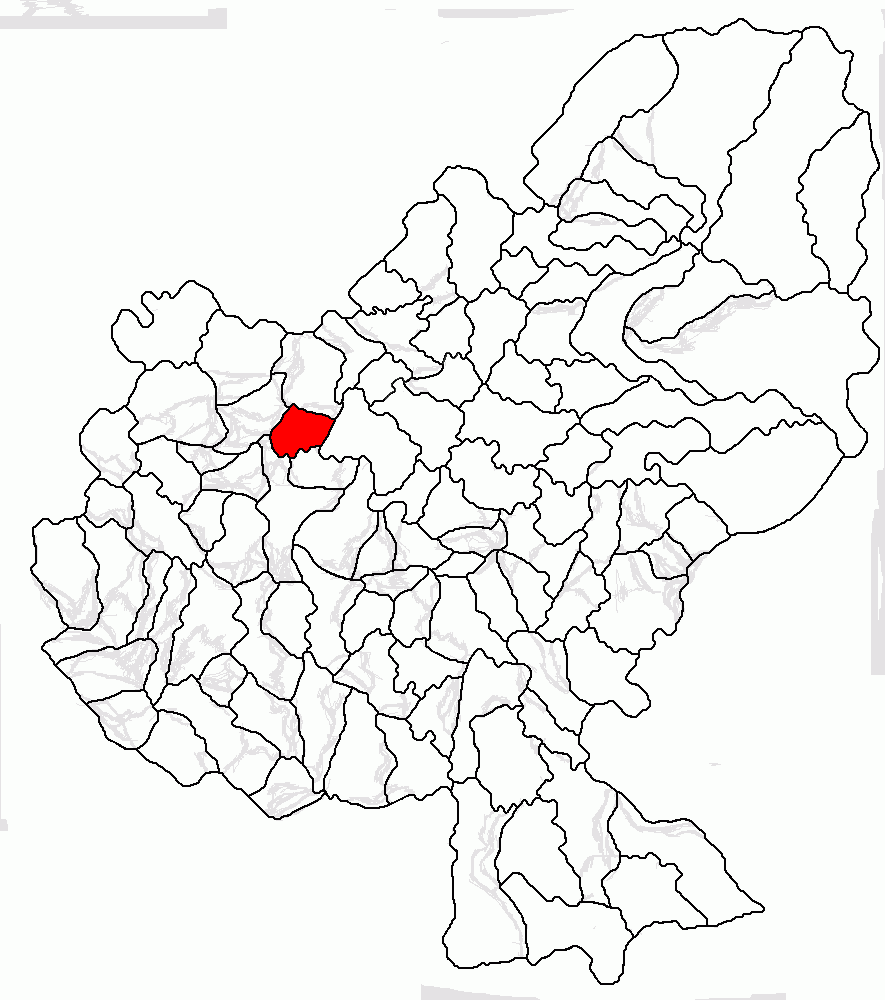
- Location in Mureș County

- Location in Romania
- Coordinates: 46°39′0″N 24°23′0″E
- Country: Romania
- County: Mureș

Government
  - Mayor (2020–2024): Vasile Pop (PSD)
- Area: 33.82 km^{2} (13.06 sq mi)
- Elevation: 320 m (1,050 ft)
- Population (2021-12-01): 1,499
  - Density: 44.32/km^{2} (114.8/sq mi)
- Time zone: UTC+02:00 (EET)
  - Summer (DST): UTC+03:00 (EEST)
- Postal code: 547595
- Area code: (+40) 02 65
- Vehicle reg.: MS
- Website: primariasincai.ro

Șincai (Hungarian: Mezősámsond, Hungarian pronunciation: [ˈmɛzøːʃaːmʃond]) is a commune in Mureș County, Transylvania, Romania composed of four villages: Lechincioara (Kislekence), Pusta (Feketepuszta), Șincai, and Șincai-Fânațe (Édeságtelek).

== Demographics ==
The commune has an ethnically mixed population, with a Romanian majority. According to the 2002 census it had a population of 1,634, of which 56.98% were Romanians and 40.58% Hungarians. At the 2011 census, Șincai had 1,622 inhabitants, of which 54.69% were Romanians, 33.17% Hungarians, and 10.17% Roma. At the 2021 census, it had a population of 1,499, of which 58.91% were Romanians, 35.49% Hungarians, and 2.6% Roma.

Șincai village (previously known as Șamșudul de Câmpie) is the birthplace of the great Romanian historian, linguist, and poet Gheorghe Șincai (1754 – 1816).

== Economy ==
The Șincai gas field is located on the territory of the commune.

== See also ==
- List of Hungarian exonyms (Mureș County)
