= Band, Mureș =

Band Mezőbánd
- Commune
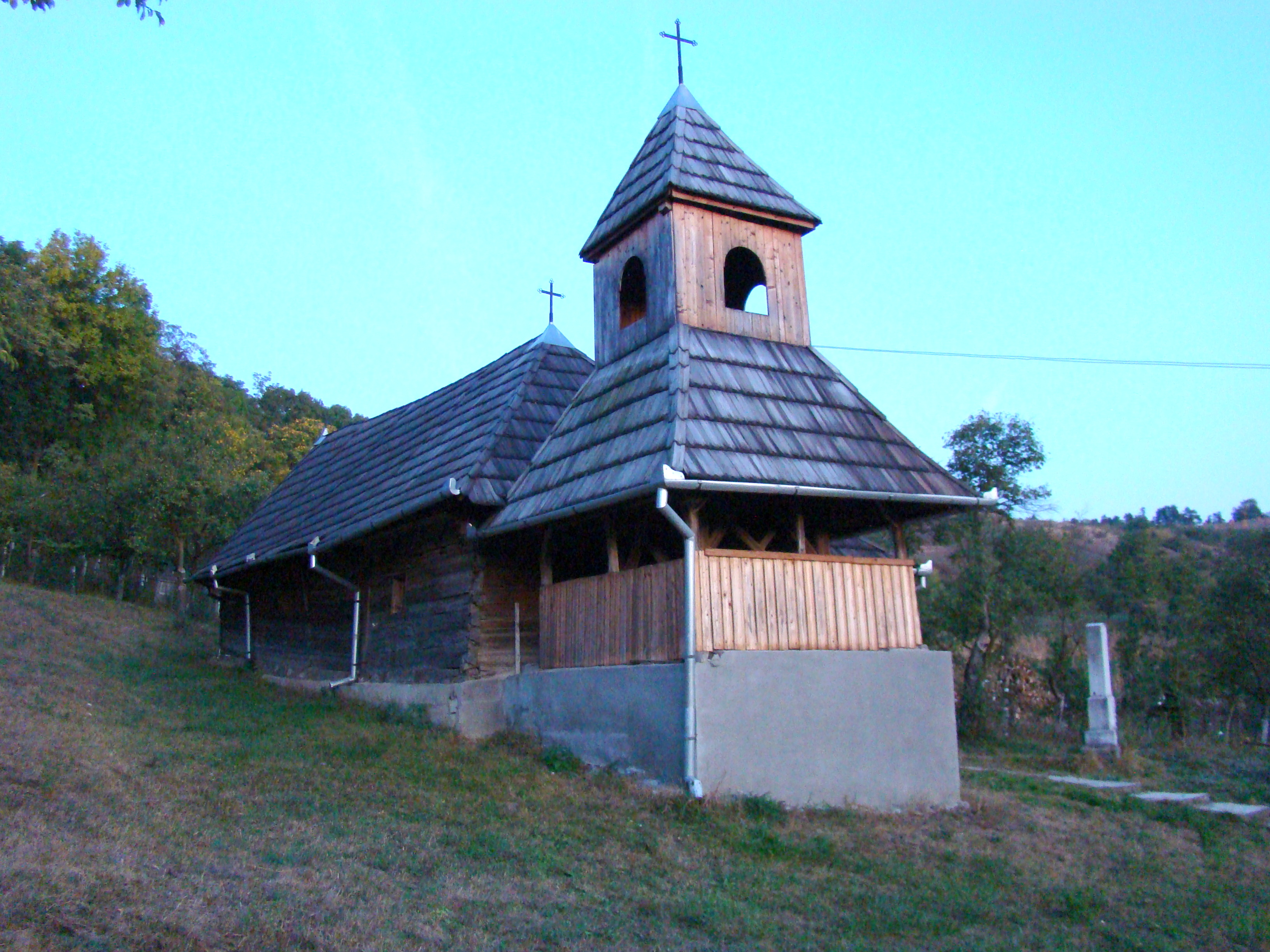
- Wooden church of the Presentation in Oroiu

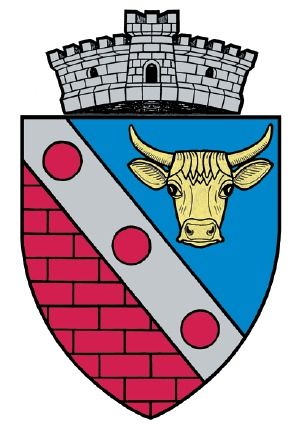
- Coat of arms

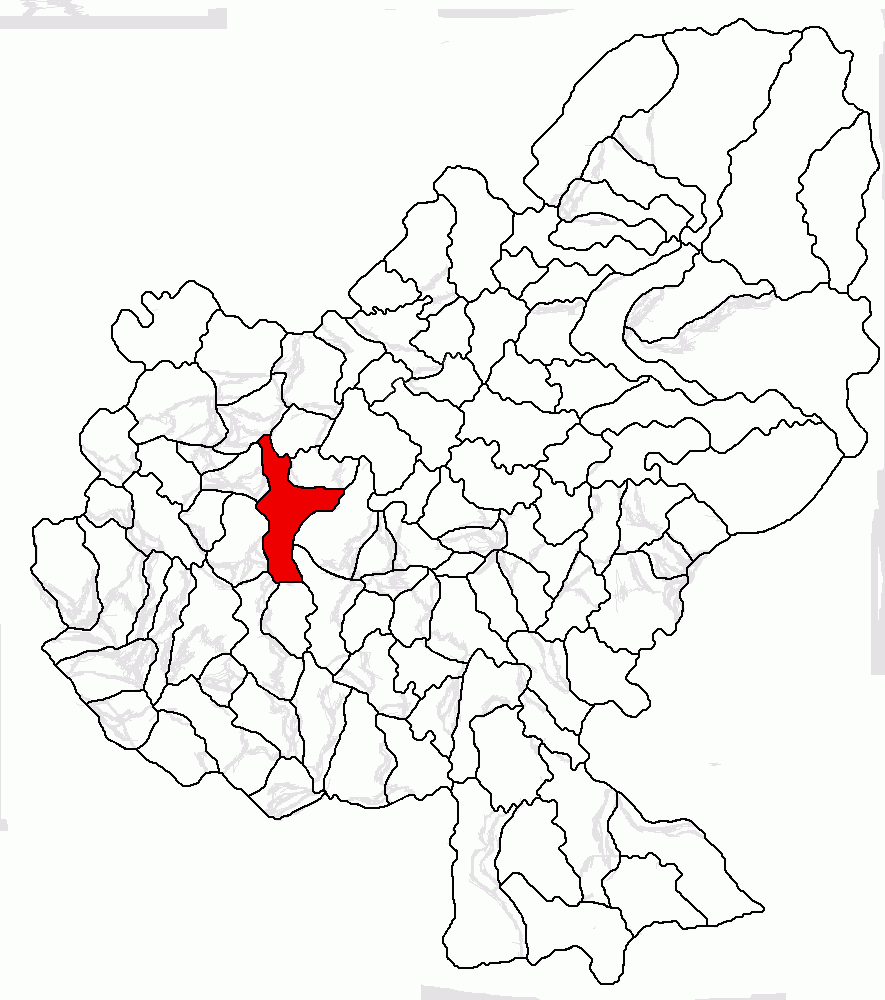
- Location in Mureș County

- Location in Romania
- Coordinates: 46°35′0″N 24°23′0″E
- Country: Romania
- County: Mureș

Government
  - Mayor (2024–2028): Adrian-Valeriu Rus (PNL)
- Area: 100.68 km^{2} (38.87 sq mi)
- Elevation: 332 m (1,089 ft)
- Population (2021-12-01): 6,126
  - Density: 60.85/km^{2} (157.6/sq mi)
- Time zone: UTC+02:00 (EET)
  - Summer (DST): UTC+03:00 (EEST)
- Postal code: 547065
- Area code: (+40) 0265
- Vehicle reg.: MS
- Website: comunaband.ro

Band (Hungarian: Mezőbánd; Hungarian pronunciation: [mɛzøːbaːnd]) is a commune in Mureș County, Transylvania, Romania, composed of eleven villages: Band, Drăculea Bandului (Drekulyatelep), Fânațe (Fekete), Iștan-Tău (Istentó), Mărășești (Marosesd), Negrenii de Câmpie (Feketelak), Oroiu (Székelyuraly), Petea (Mezőpete), Țiptelnic (Száltelek), Valea Mare (Nagyvölgy), and Valea Rece (Hidegvölgy). Mădăraș village was part of the commune until 2004, when it was split off to form a separate commune. In 2011, Fânațele Mădărașului village was also split off and transferred to Mădăraș Commune.

== Demographics ==
Historical population
Year	Pop.	±%
1880	5,546	—
1890	7,240	+30.5%
1900	7,661	+5.8%
1910	8,123	+6.0%
1920	8,019	−1.3%
1930	8,948	+11.6%
1941	9,730	+8.7%
1956	9,953	+2.3%
1966	9,755	−2.0%
1977	8,450	−13.4%
1992	7,587	−10.2%
2002	7,726	+1.8%
2011	6,446	−16.6%
2021	6,126	−5.0%
Source: Census data

According to the 2002 census, the commune had a population of 7,726, of which 45.42% were Székely Hungarians, 37.12% Romanians, and 17.46% Roma. At the 2021 census, Band had a population of 6,126; of those, 35.1% were Romanians, 31.36% Hungarians, and 19.38% Roma.

== Natives ==
- Iosif Hodoșiu (1829–1880), historian, politician, lawyer, publisher, and a founding member of the Romanian Academy
- Eszter Mátéfi (born 1966), handball coach and former handball player

== See also ==
- List of Hungarian exonyms (Mureș County)
