= Ise (river) =

River in Germany

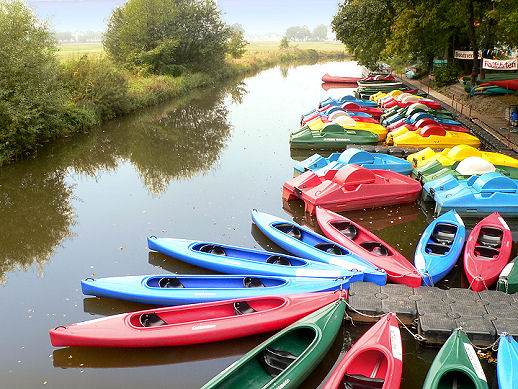
- Boats for hire on the Ise by the B 188 by Jägerhof just before its confluence with the Aller near Gifhorn

Location
- Country: Germany
- States: Saxony-Anhalt; Lower Saxony

Physical characteristics
- Source
  - location: west of Neuekrug
  - coordinates: 52°46′16″N 10°46′12″E
  - elevation: 74 m above sea level (NN)
- Mouth
  - location: In the centre of Gifhorn into the Aller
  - coordinates: 52°29′05″N 10°32′22″E
  - elevation: 51 m above sea level (NN)
- Length: 43.0 km (26.7 mi)
- Basin size: 422 km^{2} (163 sq mi)

Basin features
- Progression: Aller→ Weser→ North Sea
- Landmarks: Large towns: Gifhorn; Villages: Stöcken (a district of Wittingen), Wollersdorf (a district of Wittingen), Wentorf (a district of Obernholz), Hankensbüttel, Alt Isenhagen (a district of Hankensbüttel, Wunderbüttel (a district of Wittingen), Schönewörde, Wahrenholz, Wagenhoff, Neudorf-Platendorf, Kästorf (a district of Gifhorn), Gamsen (a district of Gifhorn)
- Tributaries
  - left: Fulau, Isebeck, Knesebach, Kiekenbruchrönne, Momerbach, Riet, Fischergraben, Flotte, Sauerbach,
  - right: Gosebach, Emmer-Bach, Bruno, Beberbach, Heestenmoorkanal,
- Waterbodies: Lakes: Mühlensee und Schlosssee

The Ise is a 43 km (27 mi) long, almost natural river of East Lower Saxony and Saxony-Anhalt, Germany. It crosses the district of Gifhorn from north to south and discharges into the Aller at Gifhorn itself.

== Course ==
The source of the Ise lies at a height of 74 metres (243 ft) above sea level and its mouth at 51 metres (167 ft). Its slope of 0.05% is very gentle. The waters of the Ise flow via the Aller and Weser into the North Sea.

The Ise is formed west of Neuekrug in Saxony-Anhalt, immediately on the old Inner German border with Lower Saxony, by the confluence of several small streams. In this Lower Saxony border region the river often runs dry in summer, but below the point where it is joined by the Rade ditch (Graben) its water flow is more consistent.

From there the Ise flows by the villages of Stöcken (a district of Wittingen), Wollersdorf (a district of Wittingen), Wentorf (a district of Obernholz), Hankensbüttel, Alt Isenhagen (a district of Hankensbüttel), Wunderbüttel (a district of Wittingen), Schönewörde, Wahrenholz, Wagenhoff, Neudorf-Platendorf, Kästorf (a district of Gifhorn) and Gamsen (a district of Gifhorn) to Gifhorn. The river's only water level gauge (Pegel) is located near Neudorf-Platendorf, 13.4 km (8.3 mi) from its mouth.

Just before Gifhorn the Ise feeds the castle moat in Gifhorn as well as the Mühlensee lake, on which the Gifhorn Mill Museum stands. In Gifhorn's town centre the Ise meets the Aller, shortly after the point where it is dammed to power a mill. In older lexica, Gifhorn is characterised as an old 'marsh castle' (Sumpfburg) on the two rivers.

== Catchment area ==
The Ise has a catchment area of 421.1 square kilometres (162.6 sq mi). This is bisected in a north-south direction by the Elbe Lateral Canal that flows at a height of 65 metres (213 ft) above sea level. The natural stream passes under the canal in culverts. The most important tributaries of the Ise are the Bruno, Beberbach and Knesebach; others include the Fulau, Gosebach, Isebeck, Momerbach and Riet. The catchment area of the Elbe begins east of the Ise region.

== Water quality ==
The Lower Saxony water quality report of 2004 assessed chemical water pollution of the Ise as variable. The values for organic pollution, nitrate, ammonium and phosphate contamination varied from lightly polluted to critically polluted. At the Jägerhof, a popular destination for day trippers, on the B 188 near Gifhorn there has been a testing station since 1967 where water quality is measured. The White-stem Pondweed, a species of plant that is in danger of becoming extinct in Lower Saxony, grows very luxuriantly in this particular area.

== Points of interest ==
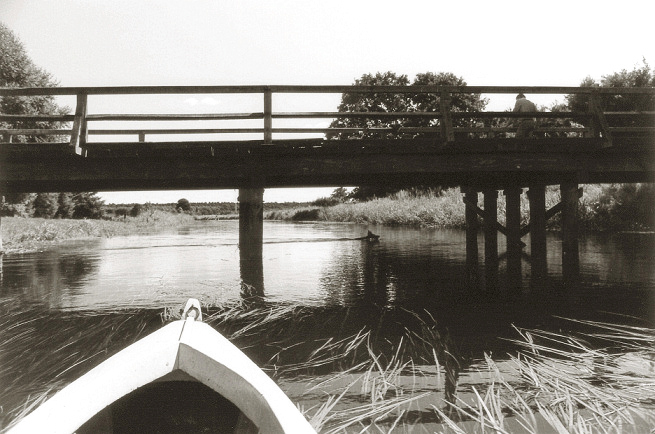
The Ise near Gifhorn, seen from a boat

The Ise used to be maintained by the Iseverband Wasser Association in Wahrenholz but has been superseded by the Aller-Ohre-Verband in Gifhorn. There is no shipping on the river but it is well suited to canoe tours (boats may be hired near Gifhorn). In recent decades the Ise and its surrounding landscape has been discovered to be a valuable natural habitat, so that its use for nature conservation has become a top priority. In general, the river crosses wide, flat meadow country, far from habitation, in a sparsely populated region. Shortly before its mouth in Gifhorn, near the river banks, are the Gifhorn Mill Museum and Gifhorn Castle. Several hundred metres downstream is another mill, the Cardenapsmühle. This has been a watermill at least since the 27 January 1213 (when it was mentioned in a deed of donation by Otto IV) and, until its closure in 2004, was one of the oldest working mills in Europe.

== Otter habitat ==
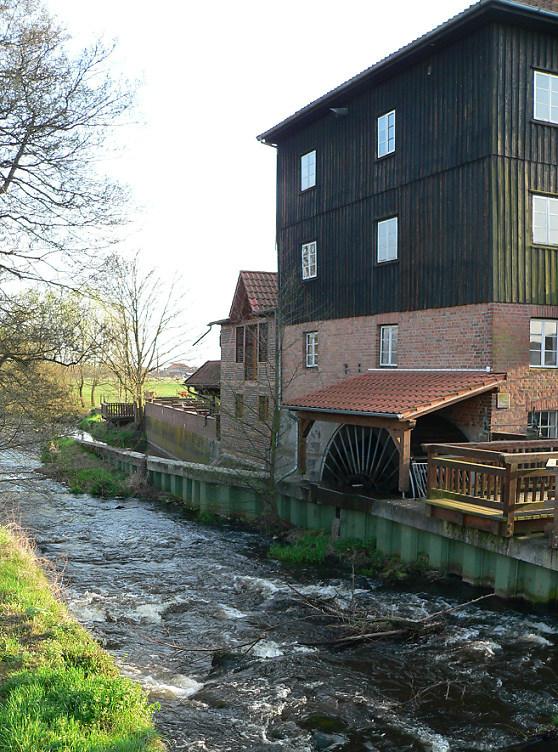
Water mill on the Ise at Wahrenholz

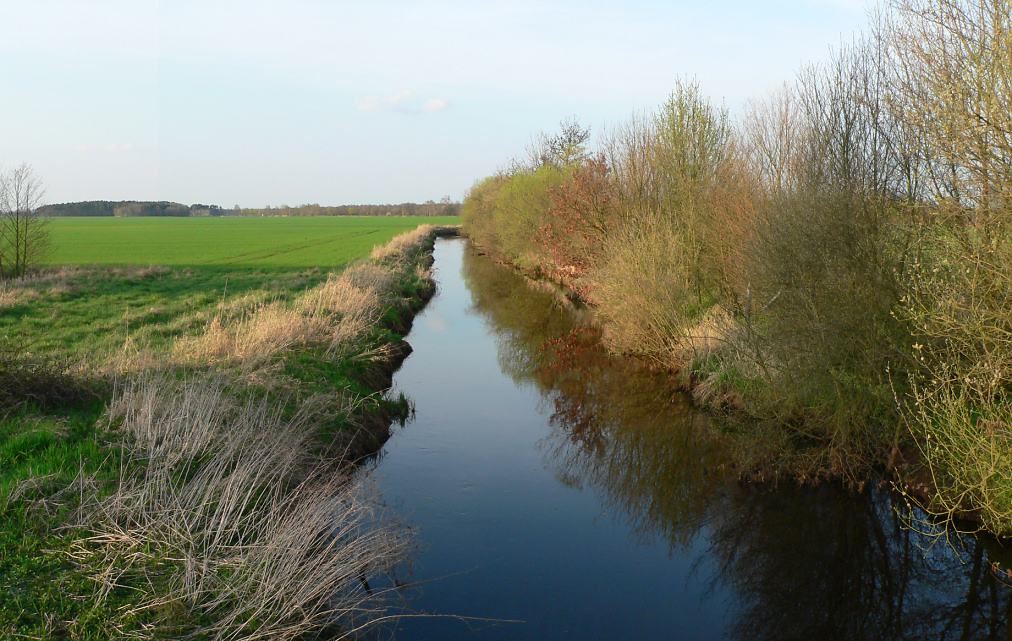
The Ise near Neudorf-Platendorf

The Emmer stream (Emmer-Bach), that discharges into the Ise, flows through Hankensbüttel, where the Otter Centre is located. The Otter Centre is a very popular tourist destination with about 100,000 visitors annually. Since 1987 they have worked on revitalising the Ise. As part of a research and development project, a lot of work has been carried out in the valley. The aim was to create a self-sustaining environment around the waterway. The leading animal species for this project was the European otter. Since 1987 the Otter Conservation Project (Aktion Fischotterschutz) has purchased around 500 hectares (1,200 acres) of agricultural land by the river and has converted the bulk of it into grassland. In addition, 46 km of unused river bank has been planted with alders. As part of long-term scientific work accompanying the project, its development has been documented and assessed.

== Name derivatives ==
The old district of Isenhagen, now part of Gifhorn district, was partly named after the river and its local newspaper is the Isenhagener Kreisblatt. In the vicinity, not far from the river, is the old Isenhagen Abbey. It was used as a monastery until the Protestant Reformation and has since become a Protestant convent.

== Timber rafting ==
In 1571 the Celle Duke, William the Younger, submitted a plan to float logs down the Ise, an activity known as timber rafting (Flößerei). Its purpose was to convey logs from the royal forests to the ducal Residenz town of Celle, where it was needed as fuel for heating Celle Castle and other royal buildings. On the Ise north of Gifhorn were several royal forests that could have been logged. For some reason the project was not carried out. In 1617 the rafting of logs to Celle was again proposed by the officials of Knesebeck and Gifhorn to the Duke of Celle, by this time Christian the Elder. Estimates at the time put the cost of transporting logs by horse and cart at about 10 times that of rafting them down the river. These plans foundered on the rocks of the Thirty Years War which started in 1618. As a result, timber rafting down the Ise was not introduced until the reign of Duke Christian Louis. For this he called for a senior forester from Harzburg and a mine surveyor from Clausthal to advise him. In the Harz mountains they had a lot of experience with timber rafting because logs were needed for the ironworks there. Based on the recommendations of the advisors, in 1659 the river was cleared of rubbish, bushes and mud by several hundred farmers conscripted for the purpose. Extensive earthworks were created in order to get rid of the many meanders and shorten the course of the river. The canal cuts in the Ise valley left artificial ox-bows. Wooden sluices with sluice channels were built at Wahrenholz and Gifhorn. The first test run was carried out in 1659 and timber rafting officially began on the Ise in 1661 when 4,400 stères of wood fuel was transported to Gifhorn and from there down the Aller to Celle.

To begin with 100 men were employed on the task. They freed logs that had jammed at critical points such as sluices, bends, bridges and ox-bows. Later a smaller workforce was employed. Under good conditions it took 10 days for log rafts to reach Celle, otherwise it might take up to 3 weeks. There were 10 assembly points on the Ise where the logs were tied together into rafts. The rafts of logs were about 2.5 metres wide by around 20 metres long. The logging crew comprised 2 or 3 raftsmen. Losses occurred as a result of logs sinking or being stolen en route. In Gifhorn, where the Ise enters the Aller, the logs continued to Celle. In Celle they came to rest at a needle dam and were then hauled ashore. After the death of Duke George William, in 1705, timber rafting on the Ise and Aller went into decline. When the royal household moved to Hanover, Celle lost the baroque lustre of a Residenz town. Raft dealers took over the business. Around 1880, timber rafting on the Ise finally petered out. The cause was the upgrade of tracks and roads and the construction of sawmills in the vicinity of the forests.

== See also ==
- List of rivers of Lower Saxony
- List of rivers of Saxony-Anhalt

== Sources ==
- Jürgen Delfs: Die Flößerei auf Ise, Aller und Örtze, Gifhorn 1995, ISBN 3-929632-24-1
