= Steinhorst =

Steinhorst may refer to the following places in Germany:

- Steinhorst, Schleswig-Holstein, a municipality in the district of Lauenburg, Schleswig-Holstein
- Steinhorst, Lower Saxony, a municipality in the district of Gifhorn, Lower Saxony
- Steinhorst (Delbrück), part of the city Delbrück, in North Rhine-Westphalia
