= Hankensbüttel Otter Centre =

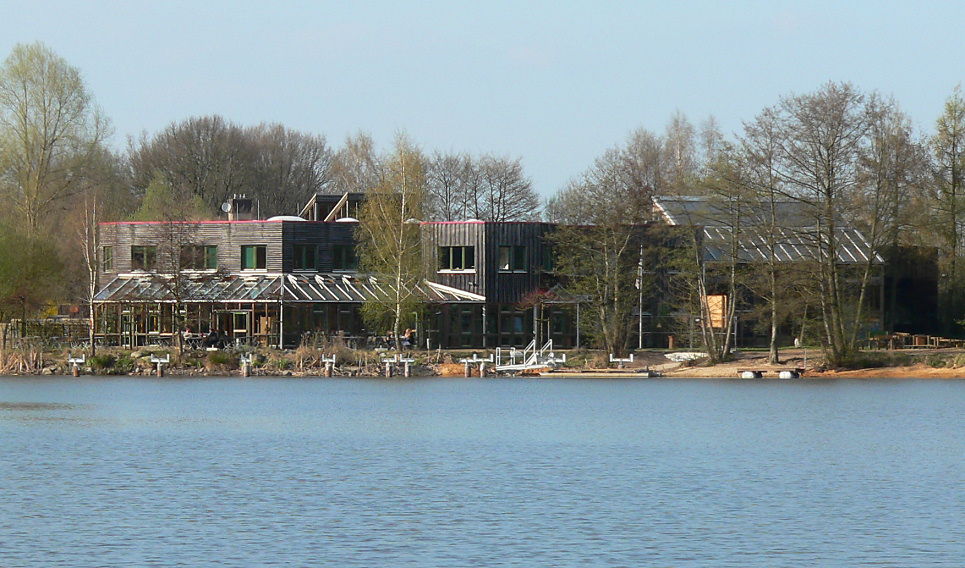
- Main building
- Interactive map of Hankensbüttel Otter Centre
- 52°43′53″N 10°37′12″E
- Date opened: 1988
- Location: Hankensbüttel, Gifhorn, Germany
- Annual visitors: 100,000
- Website: www.otter-zentrum.de

The Hankensbüttel Otter Centre is a nature experience centre in Hankensbüttel, in the German district of Gifhorn, that is laid out in 6 hectares (15 acres) of open land by a lake known as the Isenhagener See. The Otter Centre showcases the European otter which is a species threatened by extinction, as well as several related species of marten, in a natural environment. The centre is run by the Aktion Fischotterschutz ("Otter Conservation Project"), a state-recognised nature conservation organisation, and is a popular tourist and visitor destination on the southern edge of the Lüneburg Heath.

== History ==
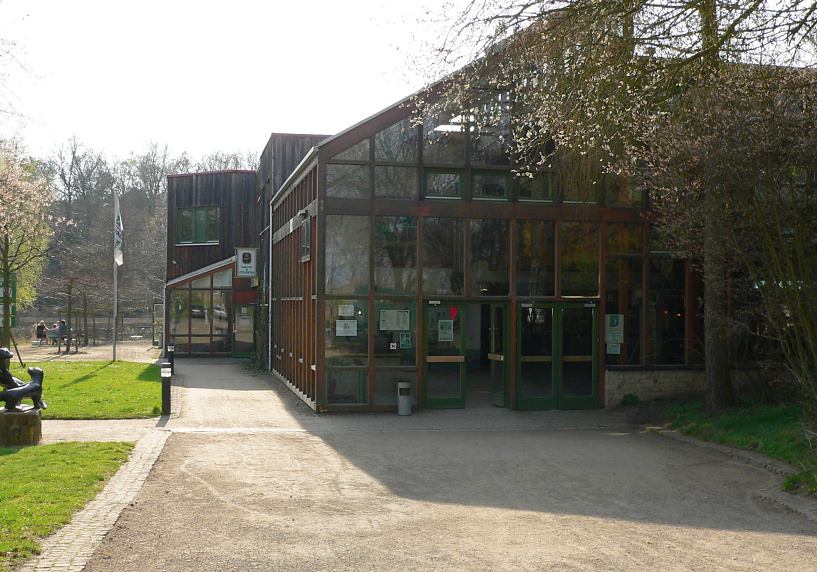
Entrance

The Otter Centre originated in the Fischotter-Forschungsgehege Oderhaus ("Oderhaus Otter Research Station") which the Lower Saxon Forestry Commission established in 1979 near Sankt Andreasberg in the Harz mountains. Claus Reuther, an official of the Forestry Commission, played a leading role, setting up the Aktion Fischotterschutz in Braunlage in 1979 which took part in the scientific investigation programme. When the project ended in 1986 the group conceived the idea for an otter centre, which was opened in Hankensbüttel in 1988. As a result, it changed from an otter conservation group into a state-recognised nature conservation organisation. The instigator of the Otter Centre was Claus Reuther who became its head from the outset. The facility suffered a setback in 1993 when there was a serious fire in the main building. Reuther was accused of causing the fire but was cleared by the court in 1995. He died in 2004.

=== Awards and prizes ===
The Otter Conservation Project and Hankensbüttel Otter Centre have won many prestigious national and international awards and prizes for their conservation work including:

- The World Wildlife Fund "Award for Conservation Merit" presented by Prince Philip in 1982
- The "Emmy and Karl Kaus Prize for Animal Conservation" in 1987
- The Nature Conservation Prize from the German Hunting Federation in 1990
- An "Honourable Mention" as part of the Rolex Award for Enterprise in 1990
- The Lower Saxony Prize for Contributions to Nature and Hunting in 1992
- An Honorary Certificate for Project Otter Centre as part of the European Environment Prize in 1992
- The Brauerei Feldschlößchen Nature Conservation Prize for the ISE project in 1999
- 1st Prize in the "Regions of the Future" competition run by the German Ministry of Transport in 2000
- Its "Regional Training Centre for Sustainable REBINA" selected as an official project in the "Creation of Sustainable Development 2005-2014" world decade by the German UNESCO Commission in 2005
- Selected as one of the 365 places in the national initiative "Germany - Land of Ideas" in 2006 supported by the German Cabinet and the Confederation of German Industry (Bundesverband der Deutschen Industrie) (BDI) and came under the patronage of the Bundespräsident, Horst Köhler. Out of 1,200 applications it won the opportunity to be presented as part of the initiative at the 2006 Football World Cup to national and international audiences.
- Its research and development plan "Creation of Sustainable Development - Positioning of Nature Conservation" selected as an official project in the "Creation of Sustainable Development 2005-2014" world decade by the German UNESCO Commission in 2007.

== Animals and habitat ==
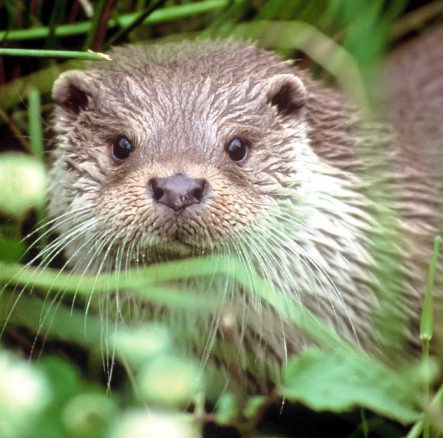
An otter in the open-air enclosure

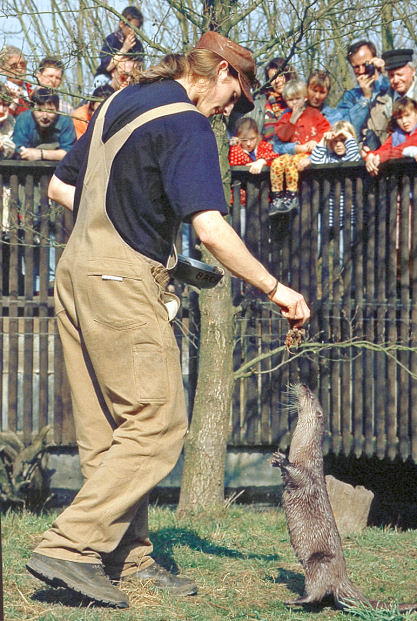
Otter feeding demonstration

The otters are kept in large, enclosures with a nearly natural habitat of streams and ponds. In addition there are various species of marten, nearest cousins of the otter, in the enclosures. The presentation of several species in this way is unique. The species include:

- Badger
- Stoat
- Polecat
- Beech marten
- Pine marten (only pine marten enclosure in Europe)
- Mouseweasel
- European mink
- Otterhound (As of 2023, these animals can no longer be seen, as the last specimen was transferred.)

The enclosures are:

- Badger hill with 17 m long visitor tunnel
- Otter pond
- Otter waterfall
- Otter brook with underwater viewing points and observation platform
- Beech marten house
- Beech marten barn
- Pine marten enclosure
- Polecat shed
- Otterhound kennels

The animal pens and habitats are based on the animals' native environment. There are the following habitats:

- Village
- Swamp
- Hedgerow landscapes
- Standing water (fish ponds and lakes)
- Streams
- Woods with boardwalk at a height of 3.5 m

== Visitors ==
Around 100,000 visitors come to the Otter Centre annually. The establishment runs about 60 special events each year, especially for children, e.g. "Life as a Red Indian", "In the Stone Age", "In a Viking Camp" etc. Visitor facilities include: a visitors' hall, otter shop, restaurant and pub.

== Environment ==
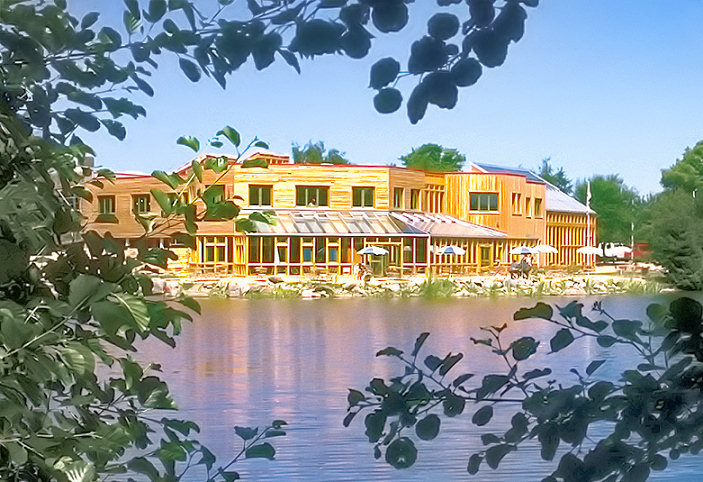
Otter Centre

The Centre provides environmental education through practical learning and experimentation. Visitors are given a closer insight into environmental and nature conservation throughout the entire site based on the motto Play and Learn. To that end there is a range of mechanical equipment, which help to illustrate various facts - for example, visitors can feed a wooden beech marten with magnetic picture plate in order to find out which food this animal actually eats.

The educational games vary considerably. A 'red thread' leads through the Otter Centre past a series of folding question boards where visitors can put their own knowledge to the test.

== Research ==
In addition to disseminating information, the Otter Centre is also dedicated to research, most of which takes place on land separated from the public areas. The research enclosures are focused on the requirements of otters and are all provided with ponds, whilst the smaller internal enclosure of the attached quarantine station is also suitable for other species.

In addition the young animals born in captivity are generally conceived and born on the research terrain in order to ensure the pregnant females can give birth in an environment which is as peaceful as possible.

== Biotope conservation ==
The Otter Centre buys or rents land with running water at various places in Lower Saxony in order to develop secluded habitats for otters. For example, a canalised water system on the Ise has been revitalised and made to resemble a natural environment. This pilot project was promoted by the Federal Environment Ministry.

An important principle with this type of biotope conservation is not to put large areas out of bounds, but to work in cooperation and understanding with local residents. So agricultural use is not banned, but encouraged along lines compatible with nature. This means in practice that only the strips along the river banks must remain completely out of bounds, whilst the remainder of the land can be used for grassland cultivation.

== Sources ==
- Claus Reuther: Das Otter-Zentrum Hankensbüttel. In: Museen und Ausflugsziele im Raum Gifhorn-Wolfsburg, Gifhorn 1989
- Claus Reuther, Willfried Janßen: Habitat Arbeitsberichte der Aktion Fischotterschutz e.V. Hankensbüttel 1993, ISBN 3-927650-05-6
- Albert Spletto: Zu Besuch im Otter-Zentrum. Hankensbüttel 1996, ISBN 3-927650-15-3
- Aktion Fischotterschutz e.V.: Otter-Post, viermal jährlich seit 1979
