= Kaff auch Mare Crisium =

1960 novel by Arno Schmidt

- Author: Arno Schmidt
- Language: German
- Genre: Dystopian fiction, science fiction
- Publisher: Stahlberg Verlag
- Publication date: 1960
- Publication place: West Germany
- Pages: 346

Kaff auch Mare Crisium (lit. "Dump, also Mare Crisium"; sometimes rendered in English as Boondocks/Moondocks) is a 1960 novel by the German writer Arno Schmidt. The book marks a transition between Schmidt's earlier fiction and his later experimental works, introducing the unconventional orthography and typography that would characterize his subsequent writing.

== Plot ==
The novel operates on two narrative levels, distinguished typographically in the text. The first is set in October 1959, when 46-year-old warehouse bookkeeper and autodidact Karl Richter visits his widowed Aunt Heete in Giffendorf, a fictional hamlet in the Lüneburg Heath, together with his 30-year-old girlfriend Hertha Theunert. Over a few days, the couple takes walks, attends a school play, makes an excursion to Hankensbüttel, and converses with the aunt about politics, literature, and sex.

The imaginative and opinionated Karl - a typical Schmidt protagonist who shares traits with the author - tells his girlfriend an episodic dystopian tale set in the 1980s. Hertha, traumatized by her expulsion from Lower Silesia as a child, listens as he describes a future in which Earth has become uninhabitable after nuclear war. A few thousand American and Soviet scientists survive in two settlements at Mare Crisium on the Moon, well-equipped technologically but lacking basic supplies like paper - and stubbornly continuing the Cold War.

Embedded within the lunar narrative are two parodies of epic poetry. The Americans adapt the Nibelungenlied to depict the heroic death of NATO troops during the Soviet capture of West Berlin; the Soviets use Johann Gottfried Herder's verse epic Der Cid for a triumphal account of their advance from Stalingrad to Berlin.

The novel ends inconclusively. Aunt Heete offers the couple a home with her; they could live off the proceeds from selling her fields as building land, freeing Karl to pursue his literary ambitions. Her conditions are marriage and childlessness. Both remain undecided.

== Style ==
Kaff auch Mare Crisium represents Schmidt's first sustained departure from standard German orthography. Drawing on Friedrich Gottlieb Klopstock's Grammatische Gespräche (1794) and James Joyce's Finnegans Wake, he renders speech phonetically, capturing the Lower Silesian dialect of Hertha and the Low German accent of Aunt Heete. He coins punning neologisms like "Roh-Mann-Tick" (raw-man-tick) for Romantik (romanticism).

The text is divided into short units of five to ten lines, each introduced by an italicized phrase. Schmidt uses an array of typographical symbols - colons, exclamation marks, slashes - to indicate pauses, gestures, and facial expressions.

A satirical preface, signed "D. Martin Ochs" (an anagram of the author's name) from the "Office for the Protection of Individuals," ironically alludes to Schmidt's 1955 blasphemy prosecution. It warns: "Anyone who attempts to sniff out 'plot' or 'deeper meaning,' or even tries to see a 'work of art' herein, will be shot."

== Reception ==
The critic Helmut Heißenbüttel ranked the novel "among the highest in German literature." Alfred Andersch called it "a magnificent, wild, sad book."

== Editions ==
- Kaff auch Mare Crisium. Stahlberg, Karlsruhe 1960 (first edition)
- Kaff auch Mare Crisium. Fischer Taschenbuch, Frankfurt am Main 1970 (paperback; new edition 1994)
- Kaff auch Mare Crisium. In: Bargfelder Ausgabe, Werkgruppe I, Bd. 3. Haffmans, Zürich 1987, pp. 7–277
- Kaff auch Mare Crisium. Suhrkamp, Frankfurt am Main 2004. ISBN 978-3-518-41650-1

An audiobook read by Jan Philipp Reemtsma was released in 2004 on ten CDs.

== Notes ==
The German word "Kaff" colloquially means a small, insignificant village (roughly equivalent to English "dump" or "one-horse town"). In Low German dialects it can also mean "chaff."
