= Wesendorf (Samtgemeinde) =

- Samtgemeinde
- Location of Wesendorf within Gifhorn district
- Interactive map of Wesendorf
- Location within Germany Location within Lower Saxony
- Coordinates: 52°31′N 10°31′E
- Country: Germany
- State: Lower Saxony
- District: Gifhorn

Government
  - Mayor (2021–26): Rolf-Dieter Schulze (Ind.)

Area
  - Total: 209.04 km^{2} (80.71 sq mi)
- Elevation: 59 m (194 ft)

Population (2025-12-31)
  - Total: 14,900
  - Density: 71.3/km^{2} (185/sq mi)
- Time zone: UTC+01:00 (CET)
  - Summer (DST): UTC+02:00 (CEST)
- Postal codes: 29392
- Dialling codes: 05371
- Vehicle registration: GF
- Website: Wesendorf.de

Samtgemeinde Wesendorf is a Samtgemeinde in the district of Gifhorn, in Lower Saxony, Germany. It is situated approximately 10 km north of Gifhorn. 14.576 citizens are living in the Samtgemeinde Wesendorf.

== Structure of the Samtgemeinde Wesendorf ==
Structure of the Samtgemeinde
Municipality	Population (31 Dec 2003)	Area (km^{2})	Population density	Villages
Groß Oesingen	2,029	57.44	35/km^{2}	Groß Oesingen, Klein Oesingen, Mahrenholz (Groß Oesingen), Schmarloh, Texas (Groß Oesingen), Zahrenholz
Schönewörde	983	17.73	55/km^{2}	Schönewörde
Ummern	1,593	40.32	40/km^{2}	Pollhöfen, Ummern
Wagenhoff	1,150	4.32	266/km^{2}	Wagenhoff
Wahrenholz	3,839	57.99	66/km^{2}	Betzhorn, Teichgut, Wahrenholz, Weißen Berge, Weißes Moor
Wesendorf	4,982	31.23	160/km^{2}	Wesendorf, Westerholz (Wesendorf)
