= Spechtshorn =

Coordinates: 52.59976°N 10.38328°E

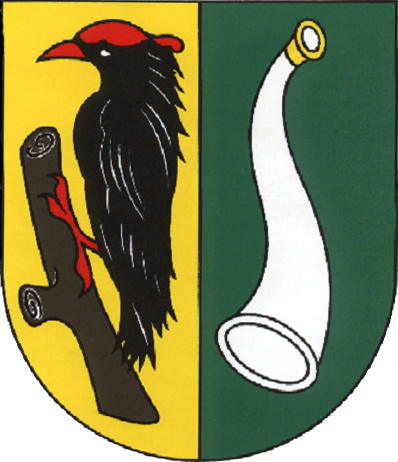
Spechtshorn's coat of arms

Spechtshorn is a village in the municipality of Hohne in the collective municipality of Lachendorf in Celle district, in the German state of Lower Saxony.

== Geography ==
Spechtshorn lies east of the River Wiehe, a right-hand tributary of the Schwarzwasser.

== History ==
The Spechtshorn Village Chronicle was collected and published in 1999 by Karl-Heinrich Dralle.

Until the early 1990s DEA extracted crude oil at various locations in and around Spechtshorn (e.g. in Schmarloh). The many green pumps were part of the village character for many years.

== Religion ==
The majority of inhabitants belong to the Lutheran parish of Hohne.

== Nature monuments ==
The Torfmoor, a peat lake several kilometres from Spechtshorn is today a popular location for ice-skating. It was formerly used to provide fuel for the region.

Spechtshorn lies near the Schmarloh, a cultural landscape, which is an important migration and breeding area for birds.
