= Hankensbüttel (Samtgemeinde) =

- Samtgemeinde
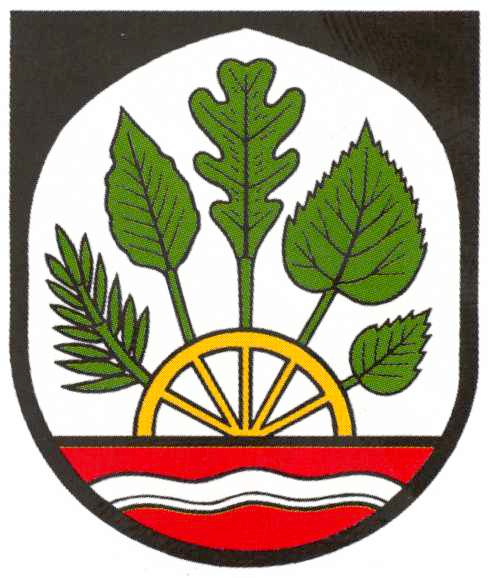
- Coat of arms

- Location of Hankensbüttel within Gifhorn district
- Interactive map of Hankensbüttel
- Location within Germany Location within Lower Saxony
- Coordinates: 52°43′N 10°35′E
- Country: Germany
- State: Lower Saxony
- District: Gifhorn

Government
  - Mayor: Werner Rodewald (Ind.)

Area
  - Total: 290.27 km^{2} (112.07 sq mi)

Population (2025-12-31)
  - Total: 8,662
  - Density: 29.84/km^{2} (77.29/sq mi)
- Time zone: UTC+01:00 (CET)
  - Summer (DST): UTC+02:00 (CEST)
- Postal codes: 29365, 29367, 29386
- Dialling codes: 05832
- Vehicle registration: GF
- Website: SG-Hankensbuettel.de

Samtgemeinde Hankensbüttel is a Samtgemeinde in the district of Gifhorn, in Lower Saxony, Germany. It is situated approximately 30 km north-east of Gifhorn and 20 km south of Uelzen. 9.739 citizens are living in the Samtgemeinde Hankensbüttel.

== Politics ==
=== Samtgemeinde council ===
- CDU - 13 Seats
- SPD - 4 Seats
- Green Party - 3 Seats
- FDP - 1 Seat
- Independent - 3 Seats

=== Structure of Samtgemeinde Hankensbüttel ===
Samtgemeinde Hankensbüttel was founded with five member municipalities. The administration of the Samtgemeinde is situated in the central village of Hankensbüttel.

=== Economy ===
The Samtgemeinde Hankensbüttel is a rural area with many forests and agriculture. Also, there are some areas of heathland that make part of the Lüneburger Heide. The biggest employer of the region is Volkswagen at Wolfsburg, that is 50 km away from Hankensbüttel. Furthermore, there is some tourism in the region (see below).

=== Tourism ===
There are some tourist sights in the Samtgemeinde Hankensbüttel: Directly at Hankensbüttel is the Otter-Zentrum (otter-centre), a zoo of local animals, and a monastery built in the time from 1345 to 1350. At Oerrel, there is a museum of hunting. Around the villages, there are forests and some areas of heathland which make part of the national park Südheide. The streets and the flat countryside are ideal for bicycle tours.

Structure of the Samtgemeinde
Municipality	Inhabitants (31 June 2005)	Surface: in km^{2}	Population density in Inh../km^{2}	Villages
Dedelstorf	1 521	76,03	20	Allersehl, Dedelstorf, Oerrel, Langwedel, Lingwedel, Repke, Weddersehl
Hankensbüttel	4 525	34,82	130	Hankensbüttel
Obernholz	940	37,82	25	Bottendorf, Steimke, Schweimke, Wettendorf, Wentdorf, Wierstorf
Sprakensehl	1 309	83,82	16	Behren, Blickwedel, Bokel, Hagen, Masel, Sprakensehl, Zittel
Steinhorst	1 44	57,78	25	Steinhorst
