= Wesendorf =

- Municipality
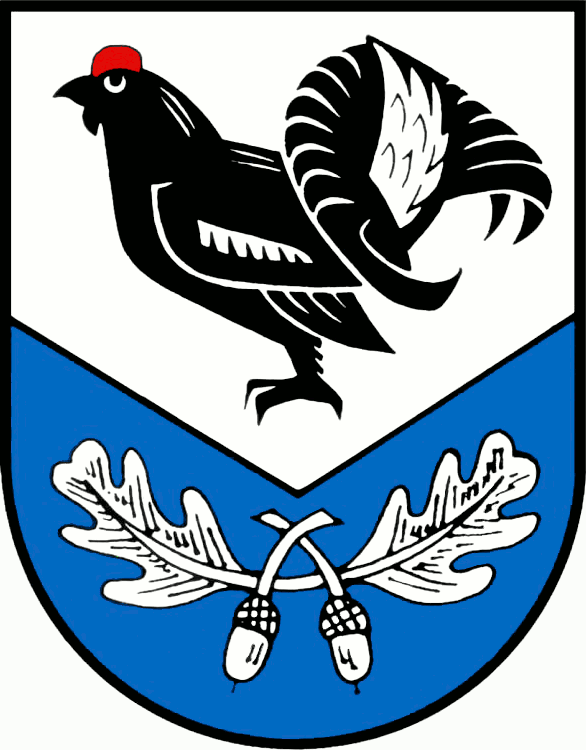
- Coat of arms

- Location of Wesendorf within Gifhorn district
- Interactive map of Wesendorf
- Location within Germany Location within Lower Saxony
- Coordinates: 52°36′N 10°32′E
- Country: Germany
- State: Lower Saxony
- District: Gifhorn
- Municipal assoc.: Wesendorf

Government
  - Mayor: Siegfried Weiß (SPD)

Area
  - Total: 31.23 km^{2} (12.06 sq mi)
- Elevation: 59 m (194 ft)

Population (2025-12-31)
  - Total: 5,624
  - Density: 180.1/km^{2} (466.4/sq mi)
- Time zone: UTC+01:00 (CET)
  - Summer (DST): UTC+02:00 (CEST)
- Postal codes: 29392
- Dialling codes: 05376
- Vehicle registration: GF
- Website: www.wesendorf.de

Wesendorf is a municipality in the district of Gifhorn, in Lower Saxony, Germany. It is situated approximately 12 km north of Gifhorn.

Wesendorf is also the seat of the Samtgemeinde Wesendorf ("collective municipality"). The municipality consists of the following villages:

- Wesendorf
- Westerholz

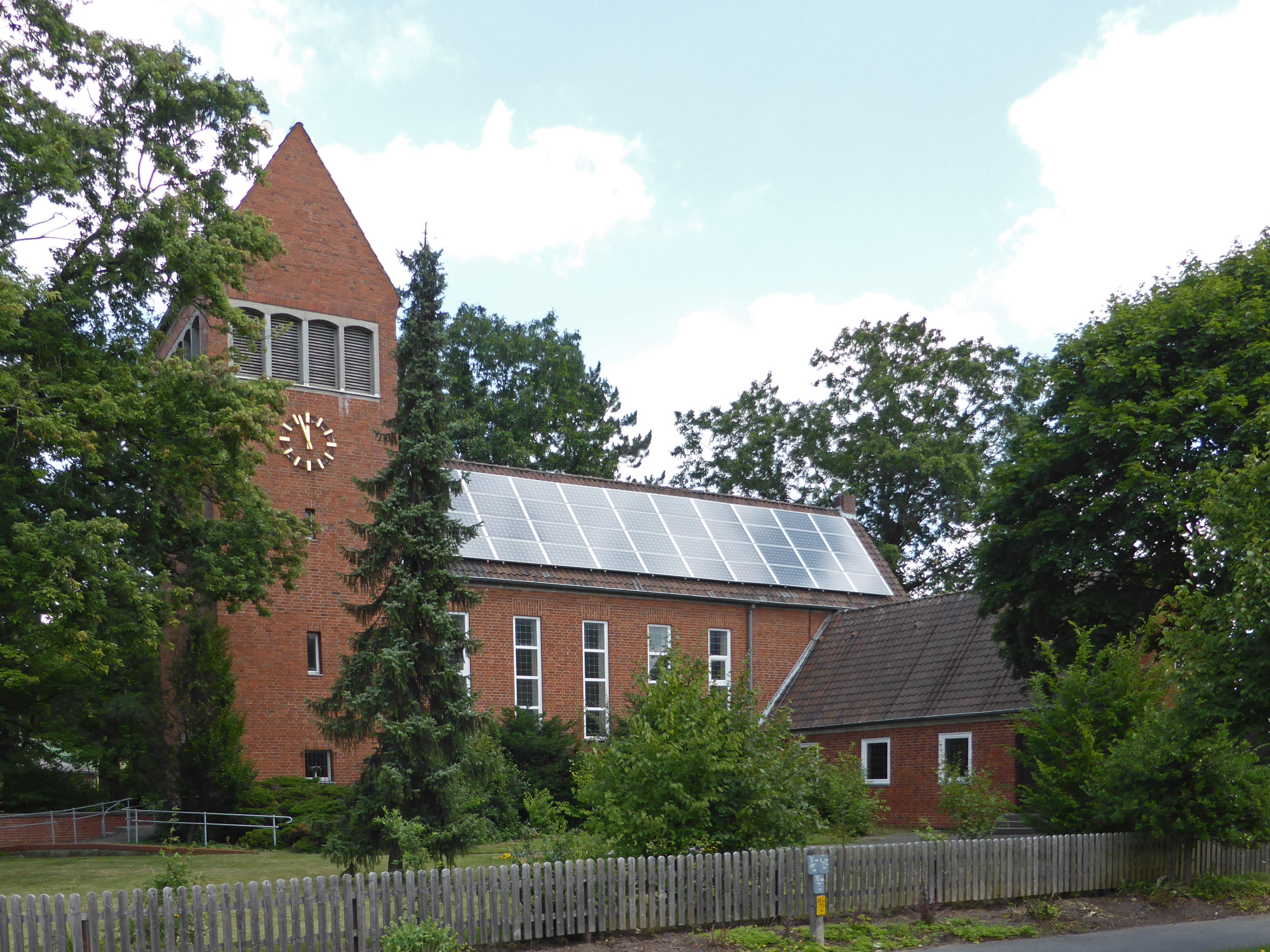
Lutheran church
