= Hohne =

- Municipality
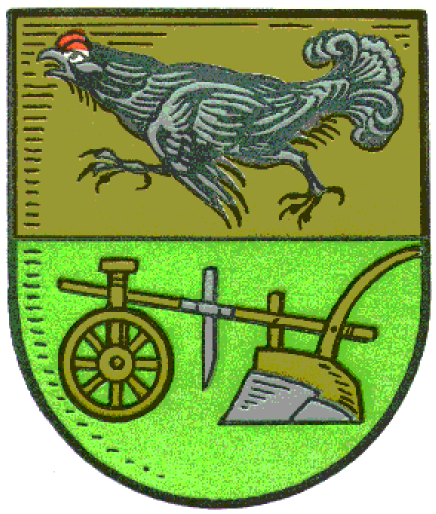
- Coat of arms

- Location of Hohne within Celle district
- Interactive map of Hohne
- Location within Germany Location within Lower Saxony
- Coordinates: 52°35′15″N 10°22′30″E
- Country: Germany
- State: Lower Saxony
- District: Celle
- Municipal assoc.: Lachendorf

Government
  - Mayor: Erhard Thölke (SPD)

Area
  - Total: 36.65 km^{2} (14.15 sq mi)
- Elevation: 48 m (157 ft)

Population (2025-12-31)
  - Total: 1,691
  - Density: 46.14/km^{2} (119.5/sq mi)
- Time zone: UTC+01:00 (CET)
  - Summer (DST): UTC+02:00 (CEST)
- Postal codes: 29362
- Dialling codes: 05083
- Vehicle registration: CE
- Website: www.lachendorf.de

Hohne (German pronunciation: [ˈhoːnə]) is a municipality in the state of Lower Saxony in Germany, east of the county town of Celle. It includes the three former parishes of Hohne, Helmerkamp and Spechtshorn. It should not be confused with the British Army camp of Hohne (German: Lager Bergen-Hohne) near Belsen about 30 km to the northwest.

== Geography ==
Hohne lies on the River Wiehe, a right-hand tributary of the Schwarzwasser, which itself flows into the River Aller near Schwachhausen.

== History ==
The Hohne Village History Society (Arbeitskreis Hohner Dorfgeschichte) has researched all records on individual villages in the area and has discovered the earliest record of the place: on Ascension Day in 1313 Bere de Hone inherited the fief of a farm at Hohne from the St. Aegidien Monastery in Brunswick. This monastery was founded before 1115 by Margravine Gertrud von Braunschweig of Meissen, last heiress of the Brunonen family.

=== Religion ===
The majority of inhabitants in Hohne are Lutheran Protestants and belong to the parish of the Church of the Ascension (Himmelfahrtskirche). Also in the parish of Hohne are the villages of Helmerkamp, Hahnenhorn, Spechtshorn, Pollhöfen and Ummern.

== Politics ==
=== Shield ===
A plough or, share and cutter argent in a fesse vert, on a chief or a cock courant sable, crested and wattled gules

== Culture and places of interest ==
=== Notable buildings ===
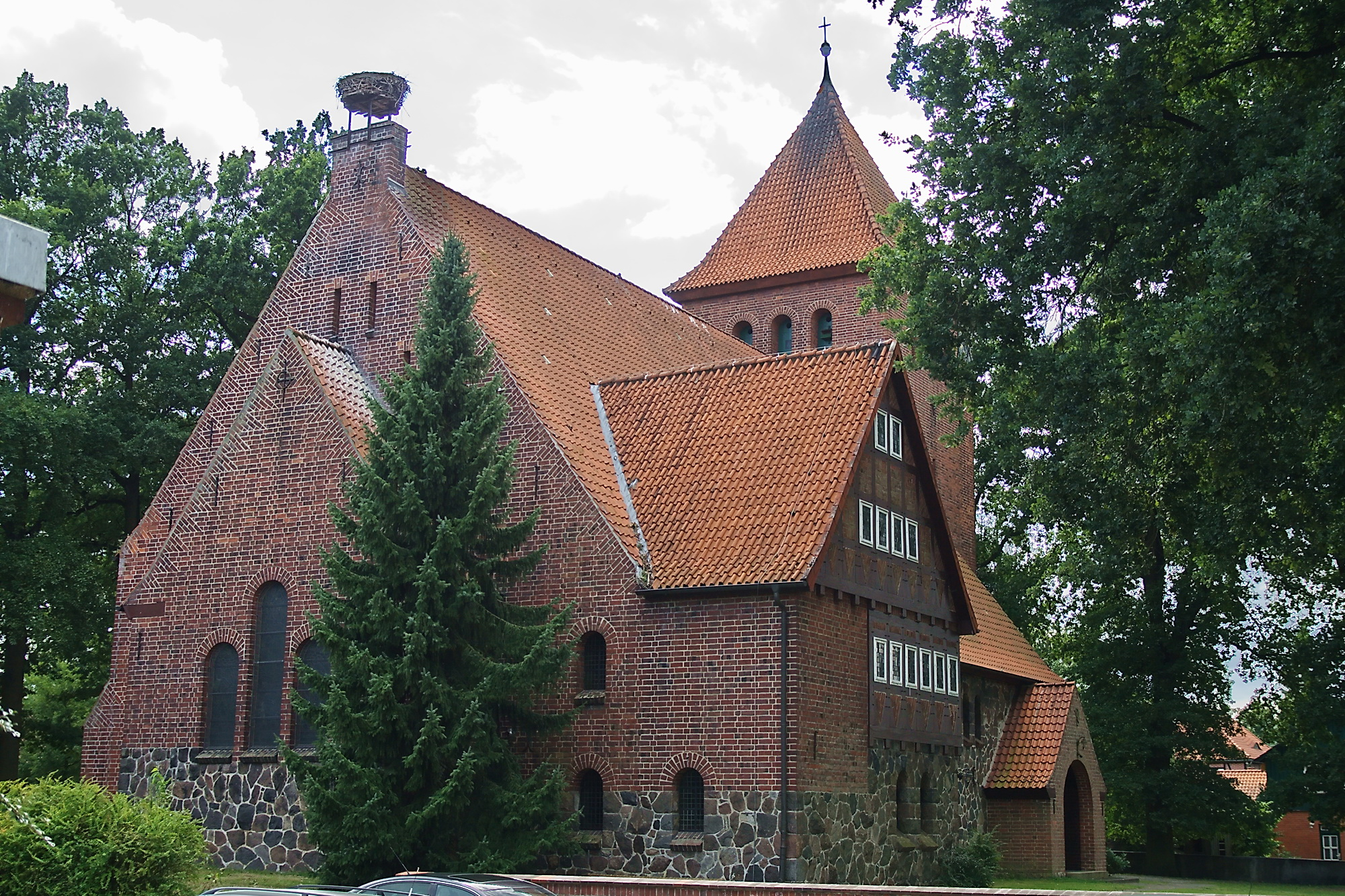
Church of the Ascension, Hohne

The ploughed-over ruins of a motte and bailey (Turmhügelburg) are situated north of Hohne on the Glindmoor towards Hohnhorst, in a field on the Hohne Manor estate (Rittergut Hohne). It was probably an earth mound on which a wooden tower formerly stood. To date only wooden remains have been found.

These structures were built across Europe from western France to present-day eastern Poland in the 9th and 10th centuries, sometimes even as late as the early 13th century. One archaeologist has suggested that it could be part of a defensive network extending outwards from Beedenbostel. More detailed research into the age of the palisade stakes that have been found on the site has not yet been possible due to financial constraints. As a result it can only be surmised that the castle was built before AD 995, perhaps together with the stone tower in Beedenbostel or at the same time as the Mundburg. The Mundburg itself was built by the old confluence of the rivers Aller and Oker near Wienhausen.

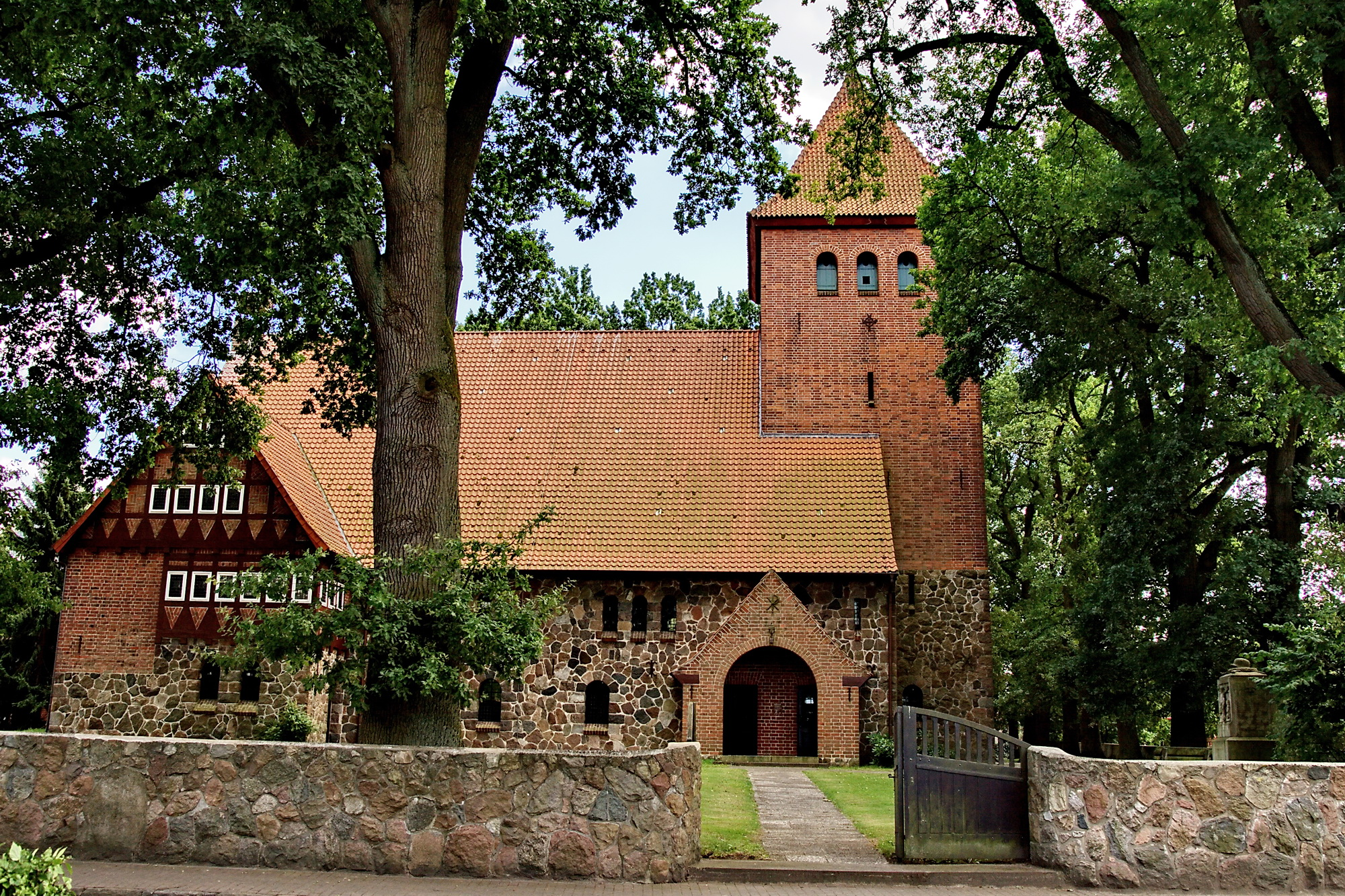
View of the Church of the Ascension from the road

The present-day 18th century Hohne Manor is partly built on the walls of the old castle that the young robber baron from Gifhorn, Hendrik von Veltheim, is believed to have destroyed on 11 July 1372 during the Lüneburg succession conflict. Areas of cobbles and large stone fragments of old foundations can still be found 0.7 metres (2.3 ft) under the present-day surface of the land (were embankments levelled out here?), which suggests that a small castle originally stood here. As at Hesleburg castle near Heeßel, and the castles of Depenau and Dachtmissen on the Aue in Flotwedel, the terrain was then wetter than today and inaccessible from Grethegau to the north. In the 20th century part of the building was moved to other locations in the estate.

The 1913 neo-romanesque Church of the Ascension (Himmelfahrtskirche) in Hohne inherited the altar, organ, pulpit and font of its predecessor church.

Hohne is also home to the "Hohne Ice House" (Hohner Kalthaus), which is run by one of the oldest ice house societies in Lower Saxony, the Kalthausgemeinschaft Hohne von 1955 e. V., on behalf of the village.

== Economy and infrastructure ==
=== Education ===
There is a primary school (catchment area: Ahnsbeck, Helmerkamp, Hohne, Spechtshorn) and a public library (Schulweg 1).

Since 1970 the German Red Cross has run Hohne kindergarten.

Educational trips are organised by the Hohne Countrywoman's Society (LandFrauenverein Hohne).

=== Sport ===
The sports club, TuS Hohne/Spechtshorn, is involved in various ball sports, track and field athletics, and judo, especially youth sports.

The Hohne/Spechtshorn Woodland Swimming Pool Society (Förderverein Waldbad Hohne/Spechtshorn) looks after the woodland swimming pool (the Waldbad), which is mainly used for youth sport. Youth swimming passes can be bought from the local branch of the German Lifeguard Association (Deutsche Lebens-Rettungs-Gesellschaft).

There are two shooting clubs: the Hohne Shooting Club (Schützengilde Hohne von 1708 e. V.) and the Spechtshorn Shooting Club (Schießgruppe Spechtshorn von 1978 e. V.)

=== Regular events ===
- The Hohne Shooting Club organises an annual shooting fair; the 2008 champion shot is Arne Heinrich, the youth champion is Yannik Müller.
- The Hohne Village History Society (Arbeitskreis Hohner Dorfgeschichte) has been putting together the village history since 2002 under the direction of Rainer Brammer. - The first two volumes were presented in 2006 at a well-attended event in the Church of the Ascension.

=== Public services ===
The equal rights representatives of the Lachendorf municipal association (Angela Barkus, Rathaus Lachendorf) act as women's representatives.

The Hohne Volunteer Fire Service (Freiwillige Feuerwehr Hohne) is a fire station with specialist roles in breathing equipment and dangerous goods and is part of the Celle district fire brigade.
