= Schmarloh =

Coordinates: 52°38′21″N 10°24′15″E

The Schmarloh is a ridge in the Südheide heath in the eastern part of the state of Lower Saxony in Germany, that lies between Groß Oesingen (Gifhorn district) and Lachendorf (Celle district) north of the Wiehe Stream. Its highest point is the 69-metre-high Jahrnsloh Berg, 2 km southwest of Groß Oesingen. It covers an area of 654 square kilometres (253 sq mi).

Originally the Schmarloh was an end moraine that was formed in the Drenthe-II stage of the Ice Age about 230,000 years ago. Several ice sheets after another at an interval of about a thousand years pushed across the existing hills of loose stone and sand, repeatedly depositing material on the tundra-like areas which were reshaped by water and wind each time.

Schmarloh is also part of the municipality of Groß Oesingen.

== Economy ==
In addition to its traditional use for agriculture and forestry, part of the Schmarloh north of Hohne is used to harness wind energy. A long-drawn out debate in the media for and against the original plans for a very large wind park earned the Schmarloh pan-regional fame. In 2004 a smaller project for 13 wind generators was approved. These have since been built and placed into operation.
