= Dedelstorf =

- Municipality
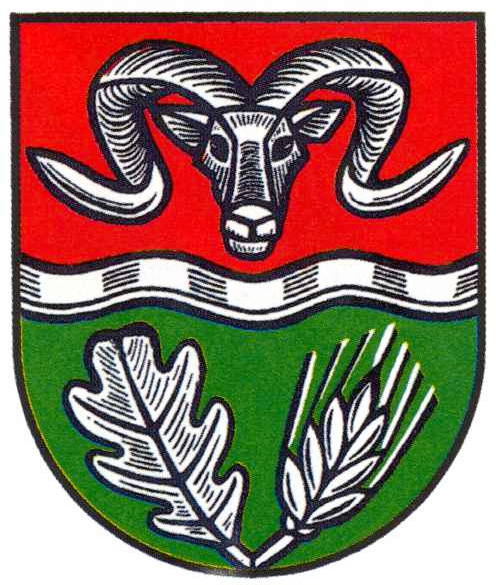
- Coat of arms

- Location of Dedelstorf within Gifhorn district
- Interactive map of Dedelstorf
- Location within Germany Location within Lower Saxony
- Coordinates: 52°42′N 10°30′E
- Country: Germany
- State: Lower Saxony
- District: Gifhorn
- Municipal assoc.: Hankensbüttel
- Subdivisions: 7 Ortsteile

Government
  - Mayor: Klaus Knühmann (CDU)

Area
  - Total: 76.03 km^{2} (29.36 sq mi)
- Elevation: 91 m (299 ft)

Population (2025-12-31)
  - Total: 1,198
  - Density: 15.76/km^{2} (40.81/sq mi)
- Time zone: UTC+01:00 (CET)
  - Summer (DST): UTC+02:00 (CEST)
- Postal codes: 29386
- Dialling codes: 05832
- Vehicle registration: GF

Dedelstorf is a municipality in the district of Gifhorn, in Lower Saxony, Germany. The Municipality includes the villages of Allersehl, Dedelstorf, Langwedel, Lingwedel, Oerrel, Repke and Weddersehl.

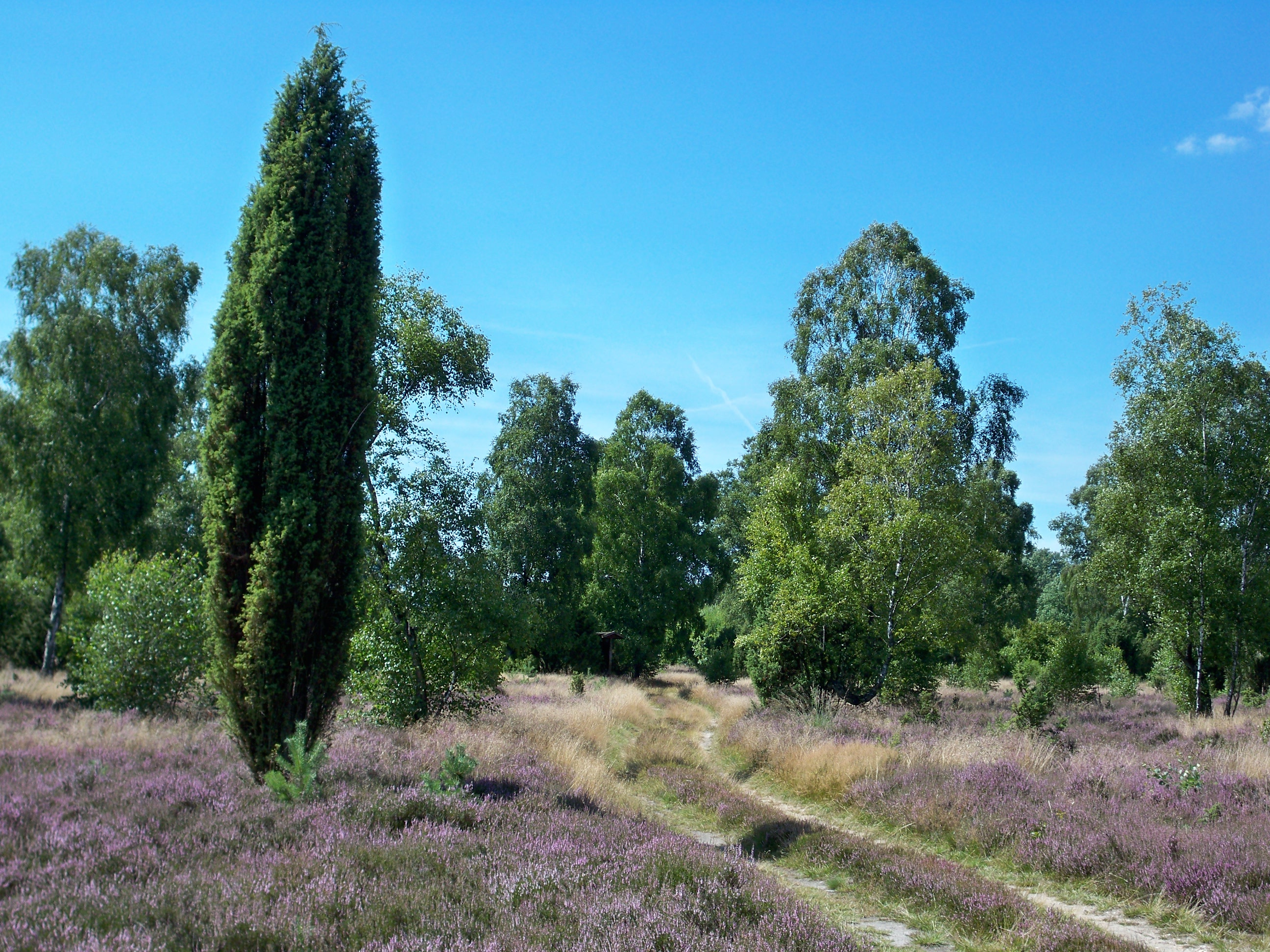
Heath landscape near Dedelstorf
