= Wahrenholz =

- Municipality
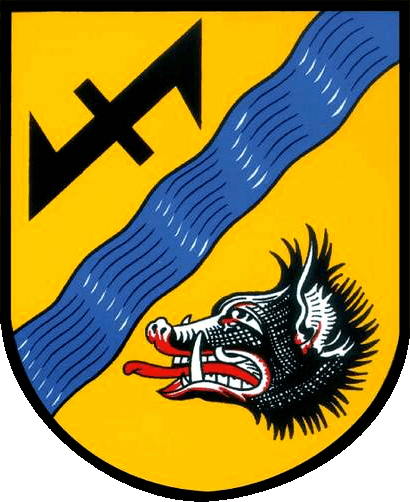
- Coat of arms

- Location of Wahrenholz within Gifhorn district
- Interactive map of Wahrenholz
- Location within Germany Location within Lower Saxony
- Coordinates: 52°37′N 10°36′E
- Country: Germany
- State: Lower Saxony
- District: Gifhorn
- Municipal assoc.: Wesendorf
- Subdivisions: 5

Government
  - Mayor: Herbert Pieper (CDU)

Area
  - Total: 57.99 km^{2} (22.39 sq mi)
- Elevation: 55 m (180 ft)

Population (2025-12-31)
  - Total: 3,739
  - Density: 64.48/km^{2} (167.0/sq mi)
- Time zone: UTC+01:00 (CET)
  - Summer (DST): UTC+02:00 (CEST)
- Postal codes: 29399
- Dialling codes: 05835
- Vehicle registration: GF

Wahrenholz is a municipality in the district of Gifhorn, in Lower Saxony, Germany. The Municipality Wahrenholz includes the villages of Betzhorn, Teichgut, Wahrenholz, Weißenberge and Weißes Moor.

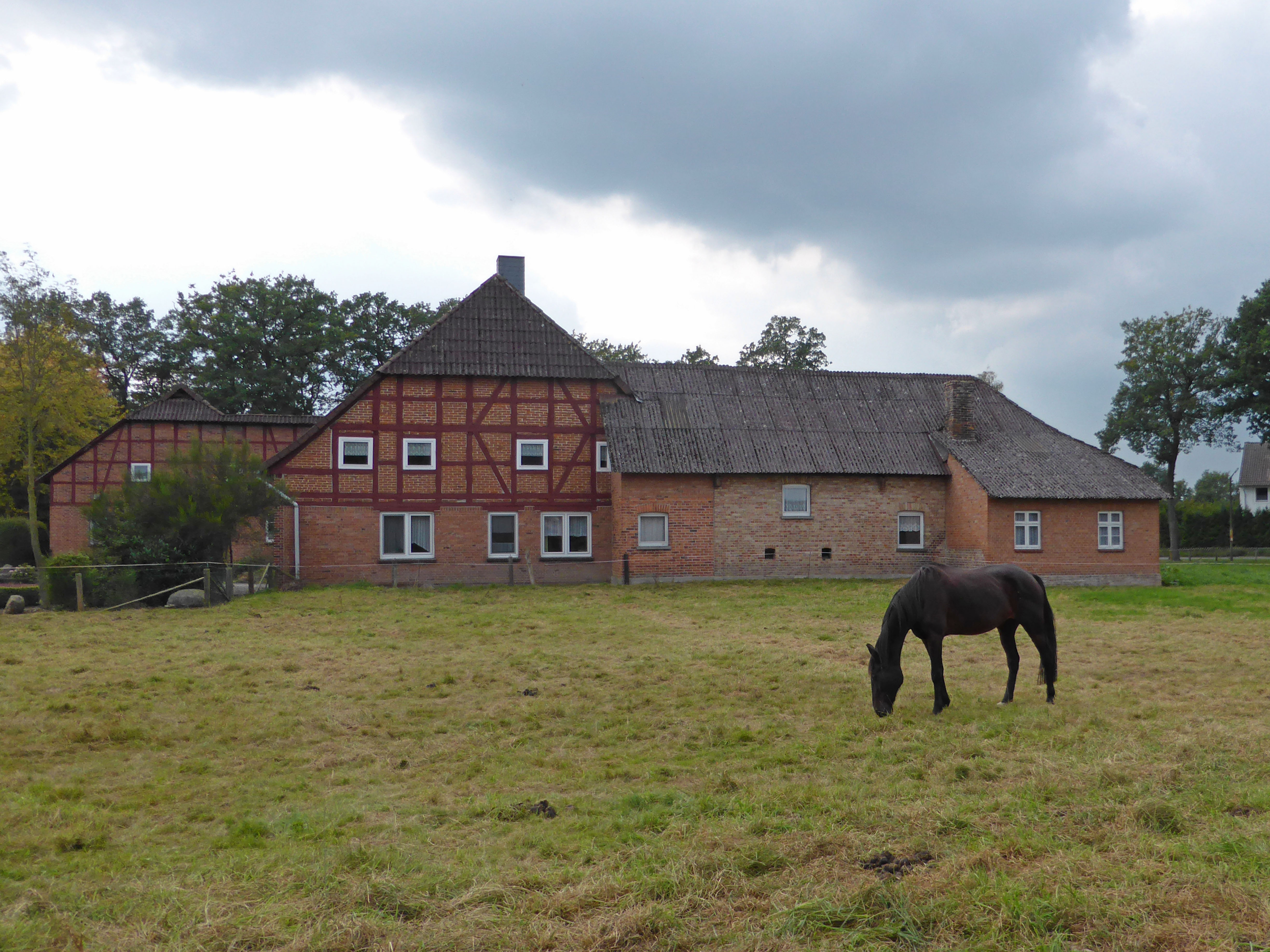
Idyll in Betzhorn

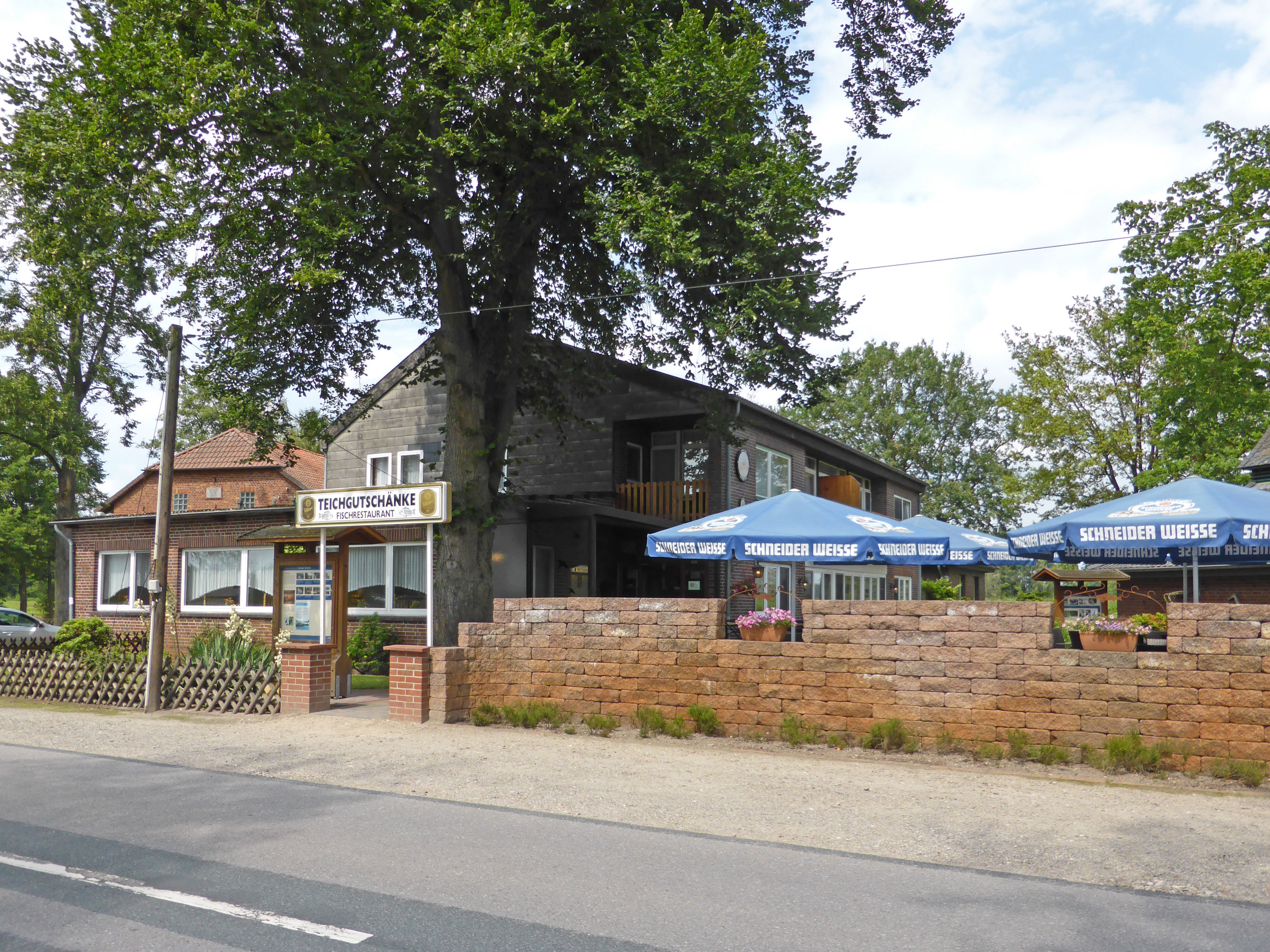
Restaurant in Teichgut

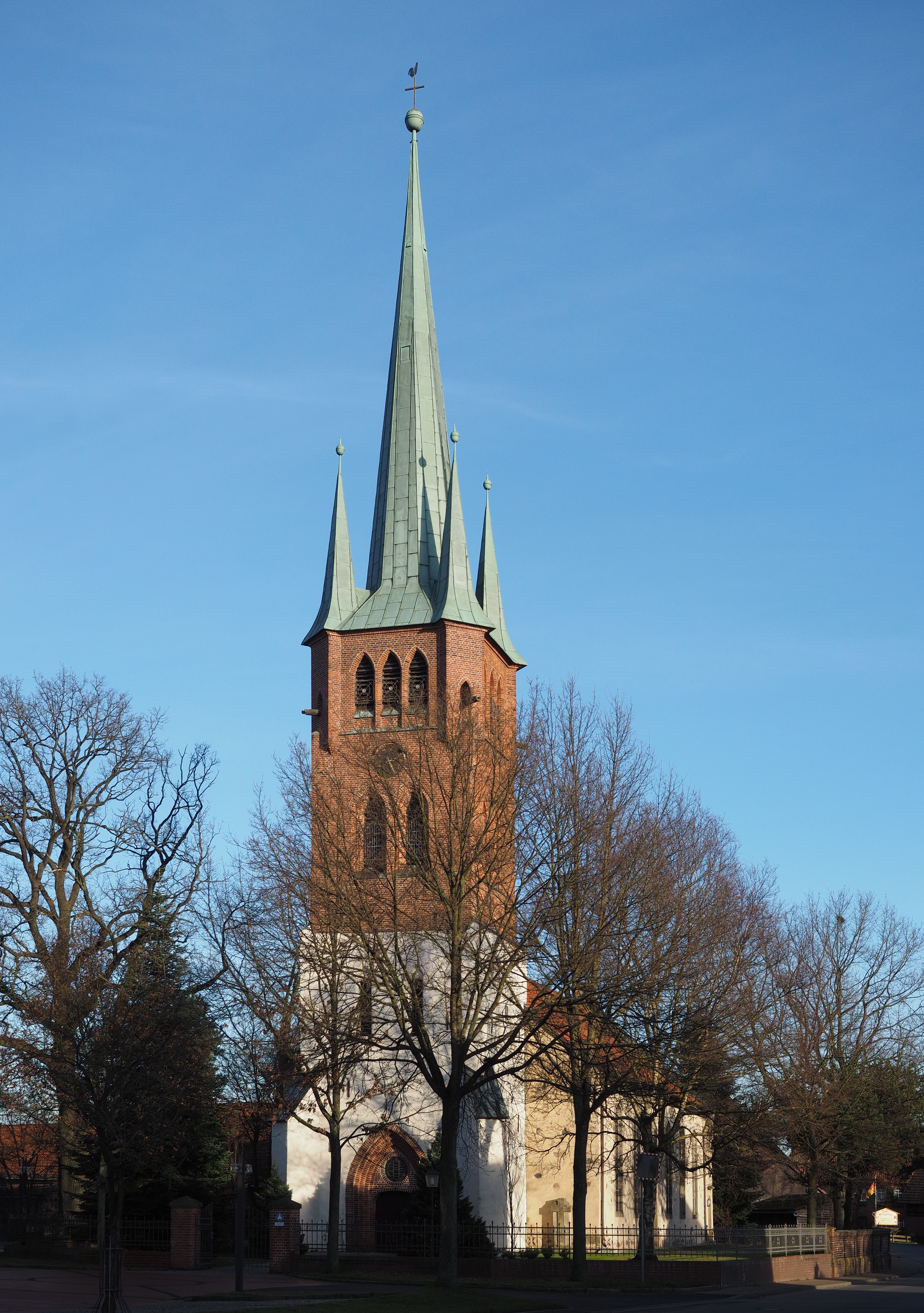
The Lutheran church in Wahrenholz

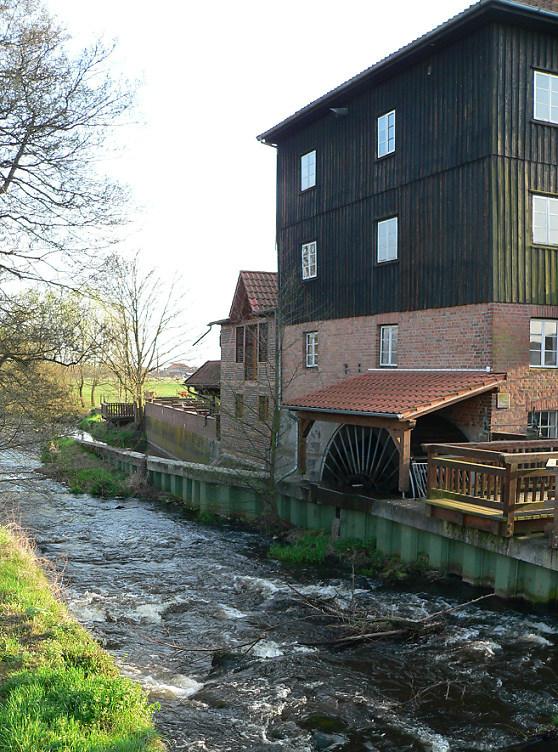
Water mill in Wahrenholz
