= Steinhorst, Lower Saxony =

Steinhorst
- Municipality
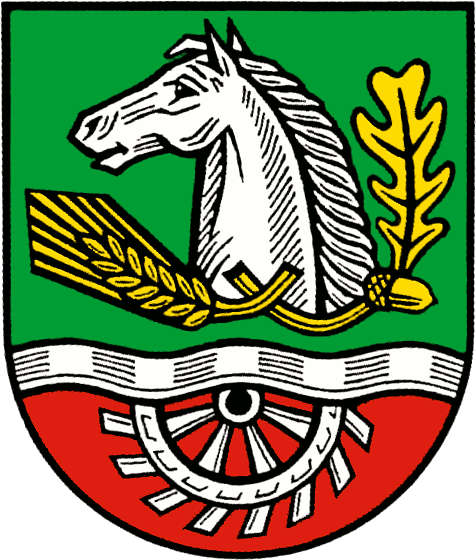
- Coat of arms

- Location of Steinhorst within Gifhorn district
- Interactive map of Steinhorst
- Location within Germany Location within Lower Saxony
- Coordinates: 52°41′N 10°24′E
- Country: Germany
- State: Lower Saxony
- District: Gifhorn
- Municipal assoc.: Hankensbüttel

Government
  - Mayor: Wilhelm Hasselmann (CDU)

Area
  - Total: 57.78 km^{2} (22.31 sq mi)
- Elevation: 72 m (236 ft)

Population (2025-12-31)
  - Total: 1,225
  - Density: 21.20/km^{2} (54.91/sq mi)
- Time zone: UTC+01:00 (CET)
  - Summer (DST): UTC+02:00 (CEST)
- Postal codes: 29367
- Dialling codes: 05148
- Vehicle registration: GF

Steinhorst is a municipality in the district of Gifhorn, in Lower Saxony, Germany. Steinhorst includes the villages of Auermühle, Lüsche, Räderloh and Steinhorst.

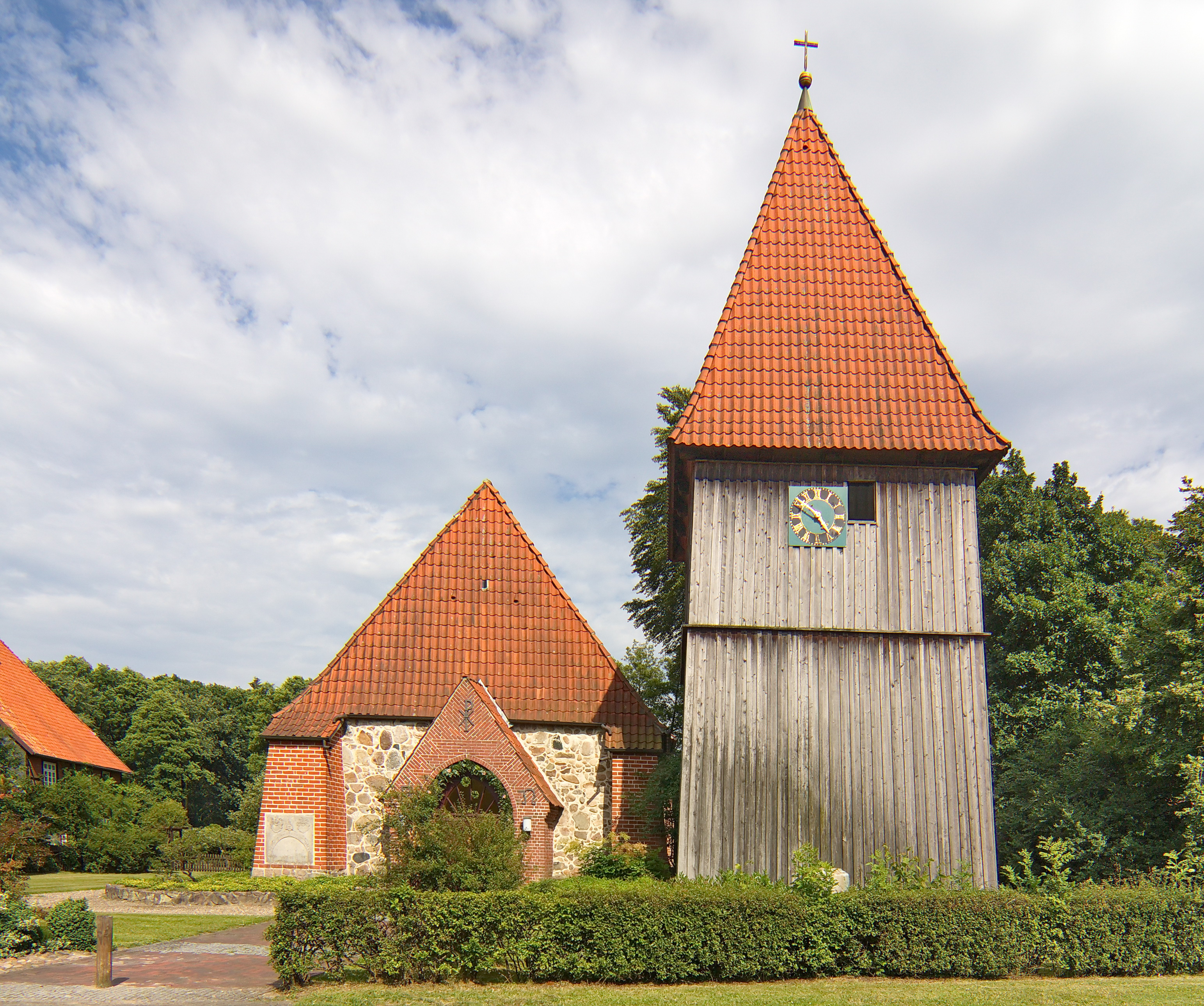
The lutheran church in Steinhorst
