= Wagenhoff =

- Municipality
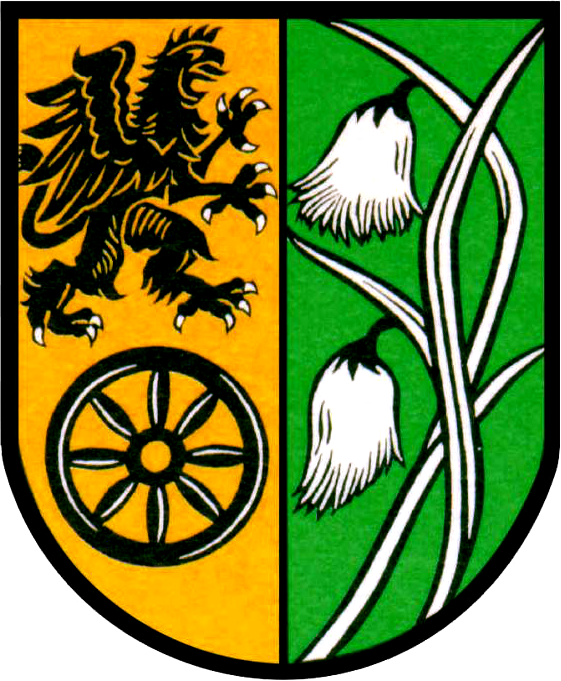
- Coat of arms

- Location of Wagenhoff within Gifhorn district
- Interactive map of Wagenhoff
- Location within Germany Location within Lower Saxony
- Coordinates: 52°32′N 10°31′E
- Country: Germany
- State: Lower Saxony
- District: Gifhorn
- Municipal assoc.: Wesendorf

Government
  - Mayor: Egon Hillebrecht (SPD)

Area
  - Total: 4.32 km^{2} (1.67 sq mi)
- Elevation: 59 m (194 ft)

Population (2025-12-31)
  - Total: 1,119
  - Density: 259/km^{2} (671/sq mi)
- Time zone: UTC+01:00 (CET)
  - Summer (DST): UTC+02:00 (CEST)
- Postal codes: 38559
- Dialling codes: 05376
- Vehicle registration: GF

Wagenhoff is a municipality in the district of Gifhorn, in Lower Saxony, Germany.
