= Schönewörde =

- Municipality
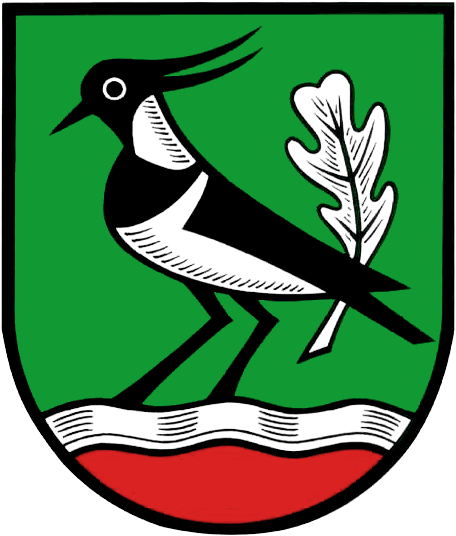
- Coat of arms

- Location of Schönewörde within Gifhorn district
- Interactive map of Schönewörde
- Location within Germany Location within Lower Saxony
- Coordinates: 52°38′N 10°38′E
- Country: Germany
- State: Lower Saxony
- District: Gifhorn
- Municipal assoc.: Wesendorf

Government
  - Mayor: Horst Schermer (CDU)

Area
  - Total: 17.73 km^{2} (6.85 sq mi)
- Elevation: 63 m (207 ft)

Population (2025-12-31)
  - Total: 867
  - Density: 48.9/km^{2} (127/sq mi)
- Time zone: UTC+01:00 (CET)
  - Summer (DST): UTC+02:00 (CEST)
- Postal codes: 29396
- Dialling codes: 05835
- Vehicle registration: GF

Schönewörde is a municipality in the district of Gifhorn, in Lower Saxony, Germany.

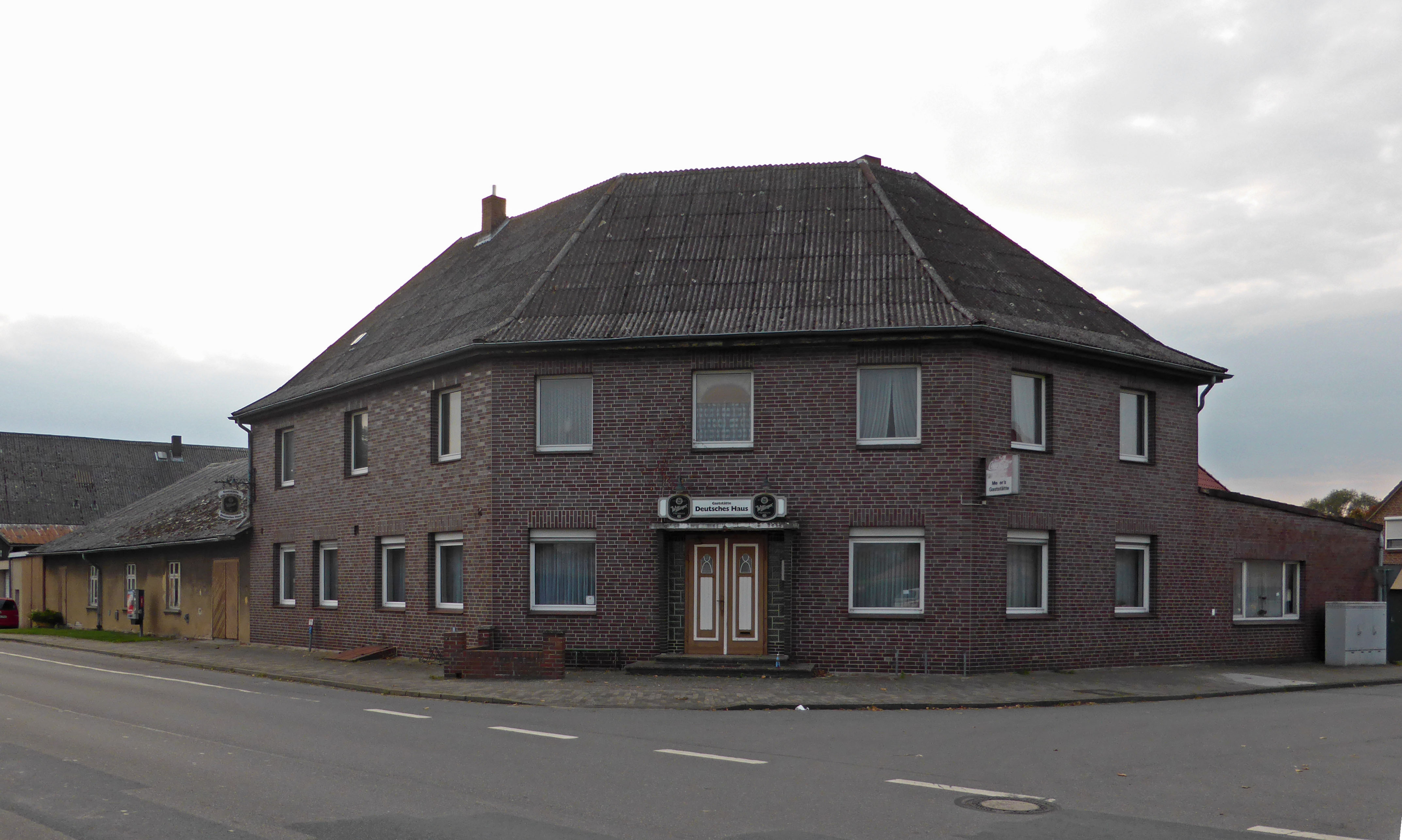
Inn
