= Ummern =

- Municipality
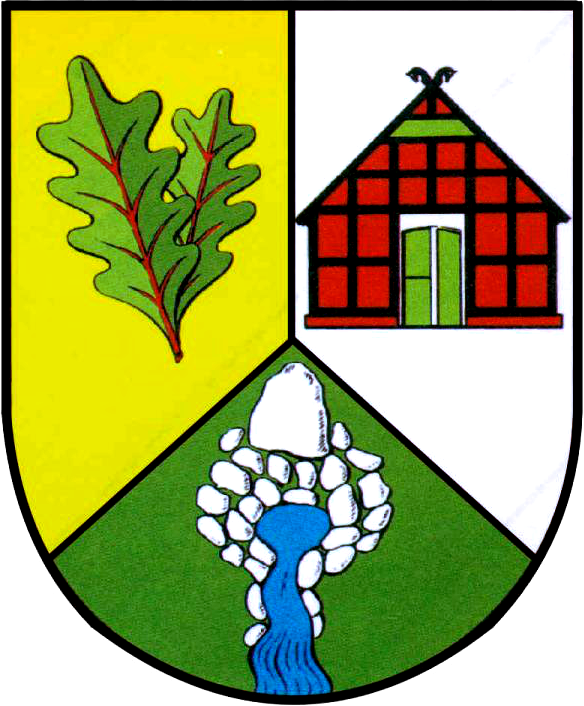
- Coat of arms

- Location of Ummern within Gifhorn district
- Interactive map of Ummern
- Location within Germany Location within Lower Saxony
- Coordinates: 52°35′N 10°26′E
- Country: Germany
- State: Lower Saxony
- District: Gifhorn
- Municipal assoc.: Wesendorf

Government
  - Mayor: Cord Wegmeyer (CDU)

Area
  - Total: 40.32 km^{2} (15.57 sq mi)
- Elevation: 54 m (177 ft)

Population (2025-12-31)
  - Total: 1,482
  - Density: 36.76/km^{2} (95.20/sq mi)
- Time zone: UTC+01:00 (CET)
  - Summer (DST): UTC+02:00 (CEST)
- Postal codes: 29369
- Dialling codes: 05083
- Vehicle registration: GF

Ummern is a municipality in the district of Gifhorn, in Lower Saxony, Germany. The Municipality Ummern includes the villages of Pollhöfen and Ummern.

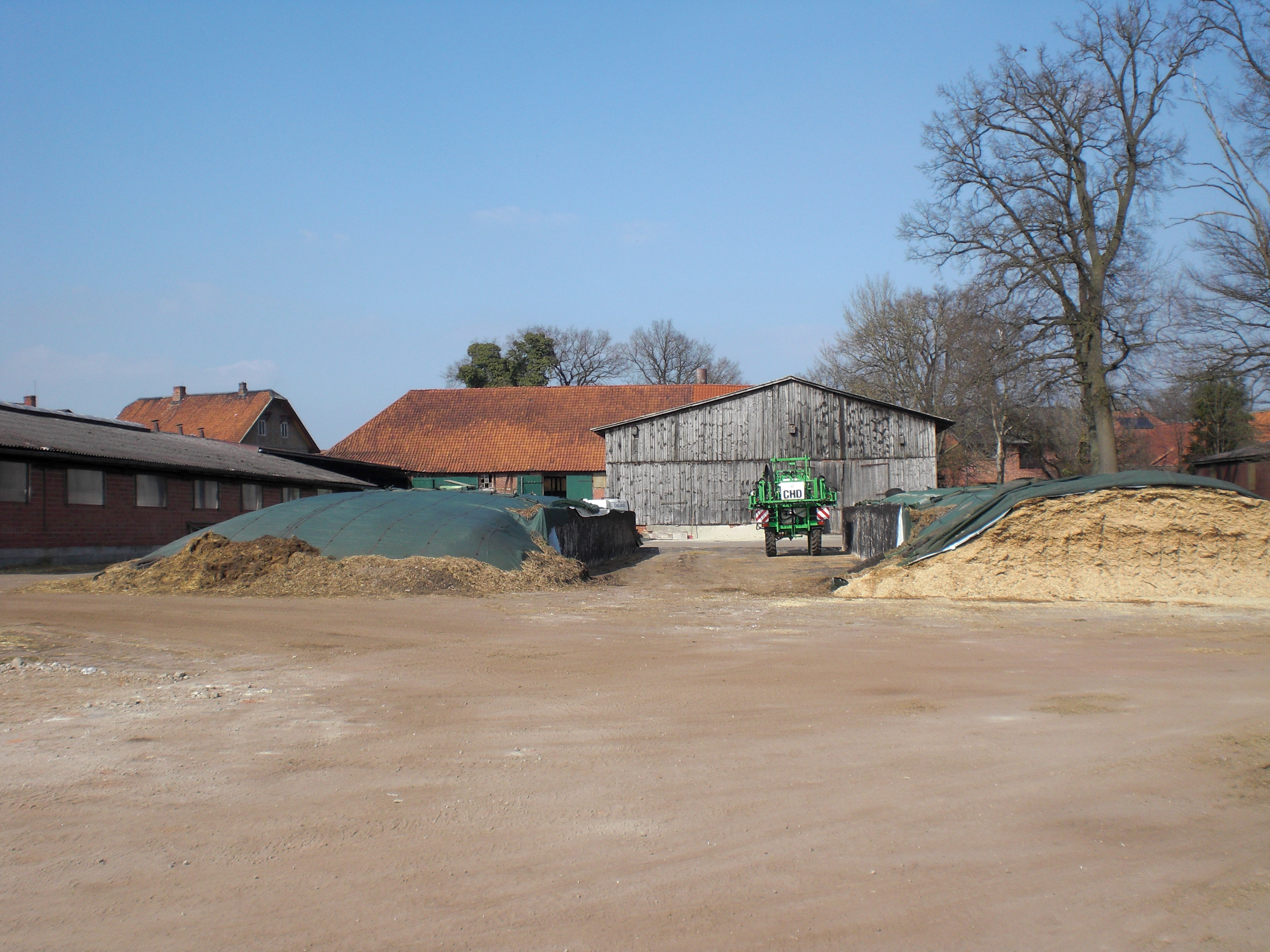
Farm in Ummern

The airfield Ummern is located about 3 km north of the village.
