= Groß Oesingen =

- Municipality
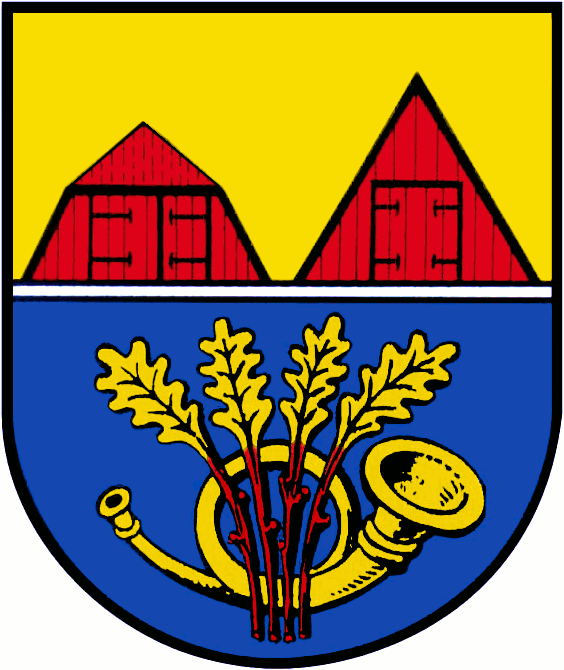
- Coat of arms

- Location of Groß Oesingen within Gifhorn district
- Interactive map of Groß Oesingen
- Location within Germany Location within Lower Saxony
- Coordinates: 52°39′N 10°29′E
- Country: Germany
- State: Lower Saxony
- District: Gifhorn
- Municipal assoc.: Wesendorf
- Subdivisions: 5 Ortsteile

Government
  - Mayor: Friedhelm Dierks (CDU)

Area
  - Total: 57.44 km^{2} (22.18 sq mi)
- Elevation: 74 m (243 ft)

Population (2025-12-31)
  - Total: 2,069
  - Density: 36.02/km^{2} (93.29/sq mi)
- Time zone: UTC+01:00 (CET)
  - Summer (DST): UTC+02:00 (CEST)
- Postal codes: 29393
- Dialling codes: 05838
- Vehicle registration: GF
- Website: www.gemeinde-gross-oesingen.de

Groß Oesingen is a municipality in the district of Gifhorn, in Lower Saxony, Germany. The Municipality Groß Oesingen includes the villages of Groß Oesingen, Klein Oesingen, Mahrenholz, Schmarloh, Texas and Zahrenholz.

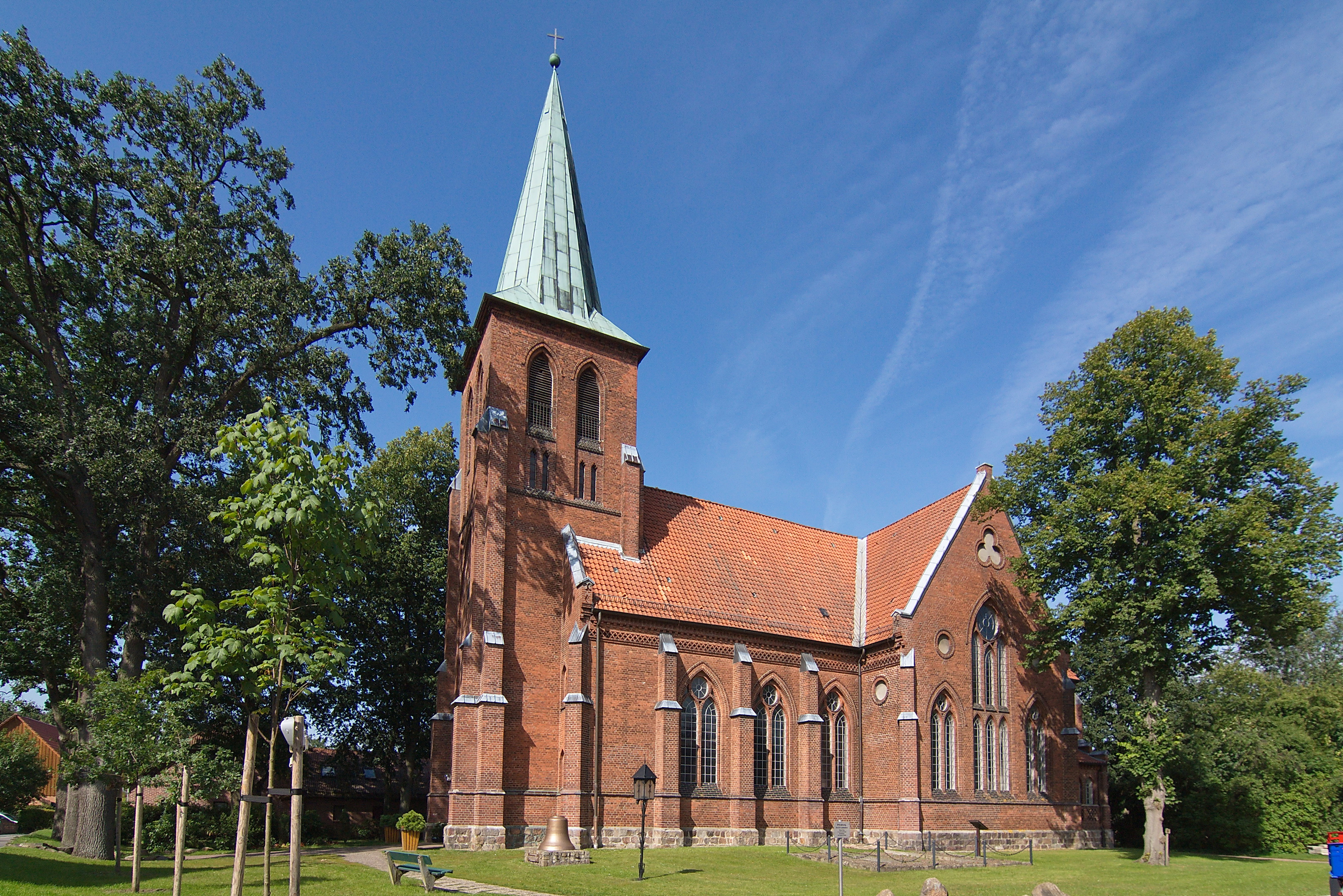
The Lutheran church
