= Obernholz =

- Municipality
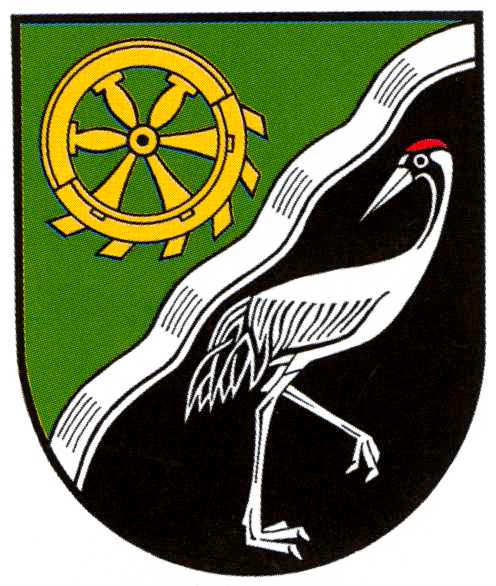
- Coat of arms

- Location of Obernholz within Gifhorn district
- Interactive map of Obernholz
- Location within Germany Location within Lower Saxony
- Coordinates: 52°45′N 10°37′E
- Country: Germany
- State: Lower Saxony
- District: Gifhorn
- Municipal assoc.: Hankensbüttel
- Subdivisions: 6 Ortsteile

Government
  - Mayor: Werner Rodewald

Area
  - Total: 37.82 km^{2} (14.60 sq mi)
- Elevation: 84 m (276 ft)

Population (2025-12-31)
  - Total: 801
  - Density: 21.2/km^{2} (54.9/sq mi)
- Time zone: UTC+01:00 (CET)
  - Summer (DST): UTC+02:00 (CEST)
- Postal codes: 29386
- Dialling codes: 05832
- Vehicle registration: GF

Obernholz is a municipality in the district of Gifhorn, in Lower Saxony, Germany. Obernholz includes the little villages of Bottendorf, Steimke, Schweimke, Wettendorf, Wentorf and Wierstorf.

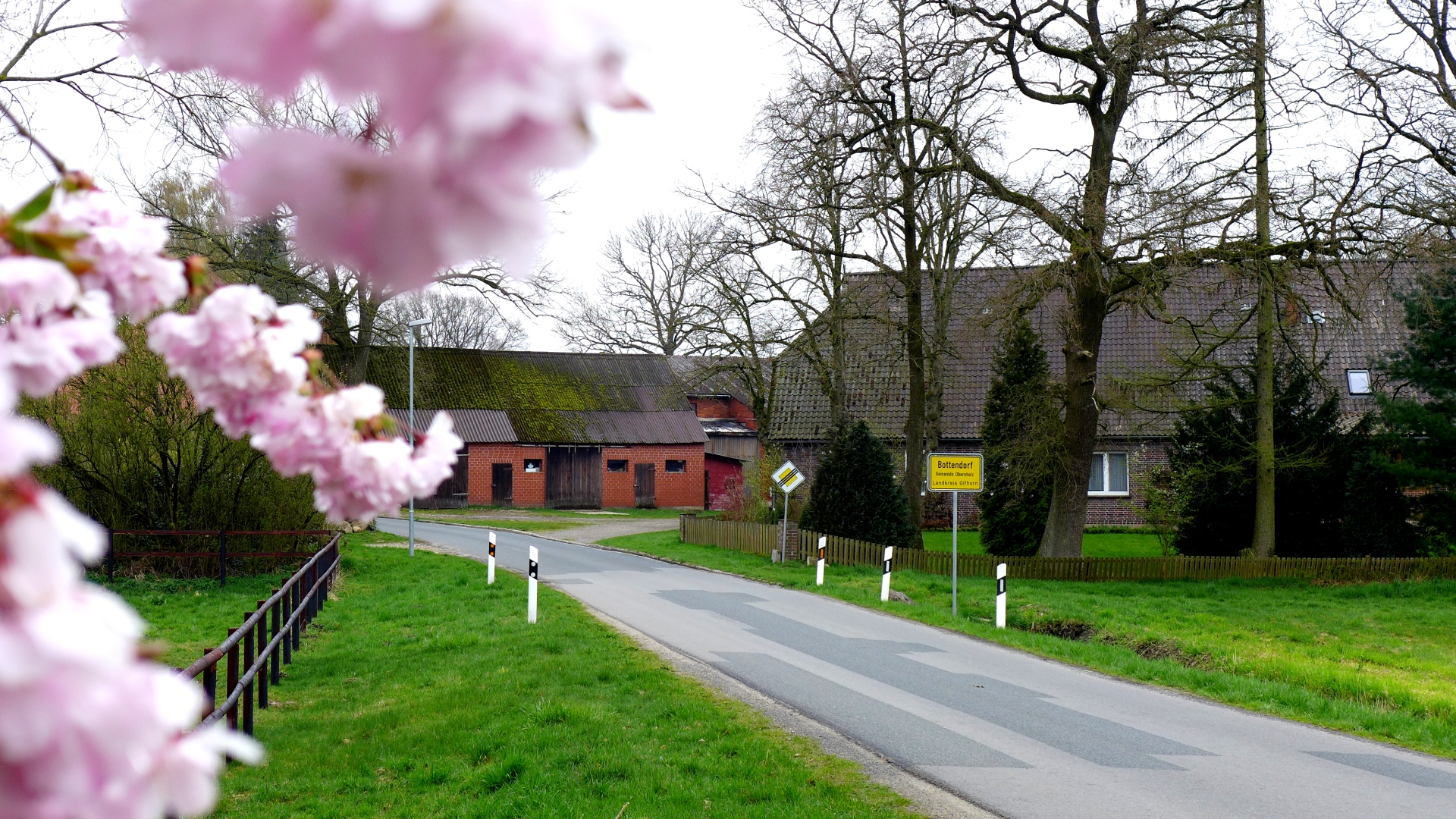
Bottendorf
