= Hankensbüttel =

- Municipality
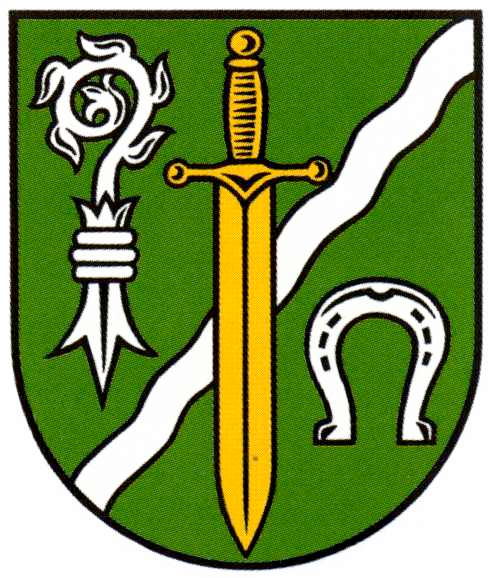
- Coat of arms

- Location of Hankensbüttel within Gifhorn district
- Interactive map of Hankensbüttel
- Location within Germany Location within Lower Saxony
- Coordinates: 52°44′N 10°36′E
- Country: Germany
- State: Lower Saxony
- District: Gifhorn
- Municipal assoc.: Hankensbüttel

Government
  - Mayor: Dirk Köllner (CDU)

Area
  - Total: 34.82 km^{2} (13.44 sq mi)
- Elevation: 82 m (269 ft)

Population (2025-12-31)
  - Total: 4,344
  - Density: 124.8/km^{2} (323.1/sq mi)
- Time zone: UTC+01:00 (CET)
  - Summer (DST): UTC+02:00 (CEST)
- Postal codes: 29386
- Dialling codes: 05832
- Vehicle registration: GF

Hankensbüttel is a municipality in the Samtgemeinde Hankensbüttel in the district of Gifhorn, Lower Saxony, Germany. It is situated approximately 25 km south of Uelzen, and 30 km north of Gifhorn. The Municipality Hankensbüttel includes the villages of Alt Isenhagen, Emmen and Hankensbüttel.

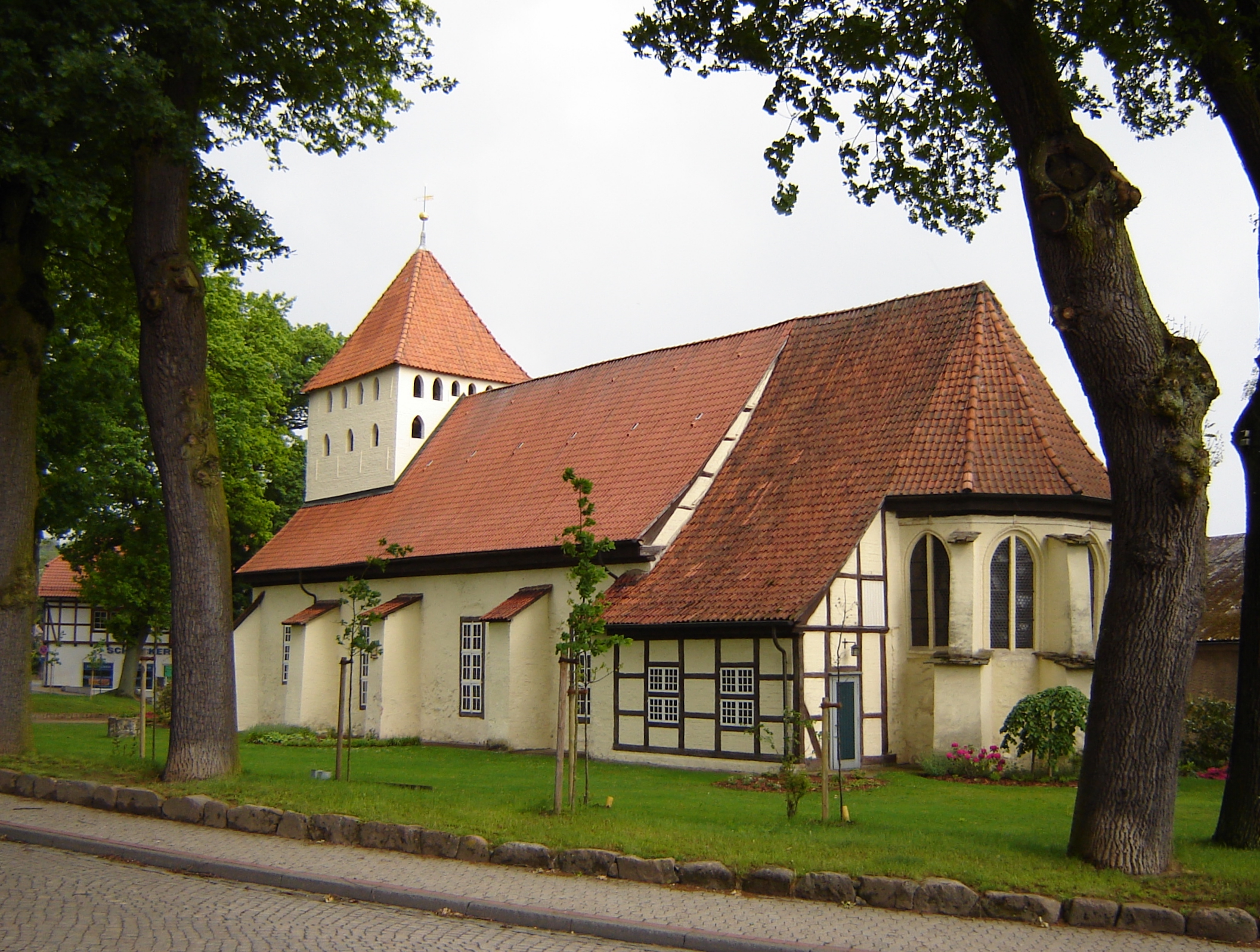
Lutheran church

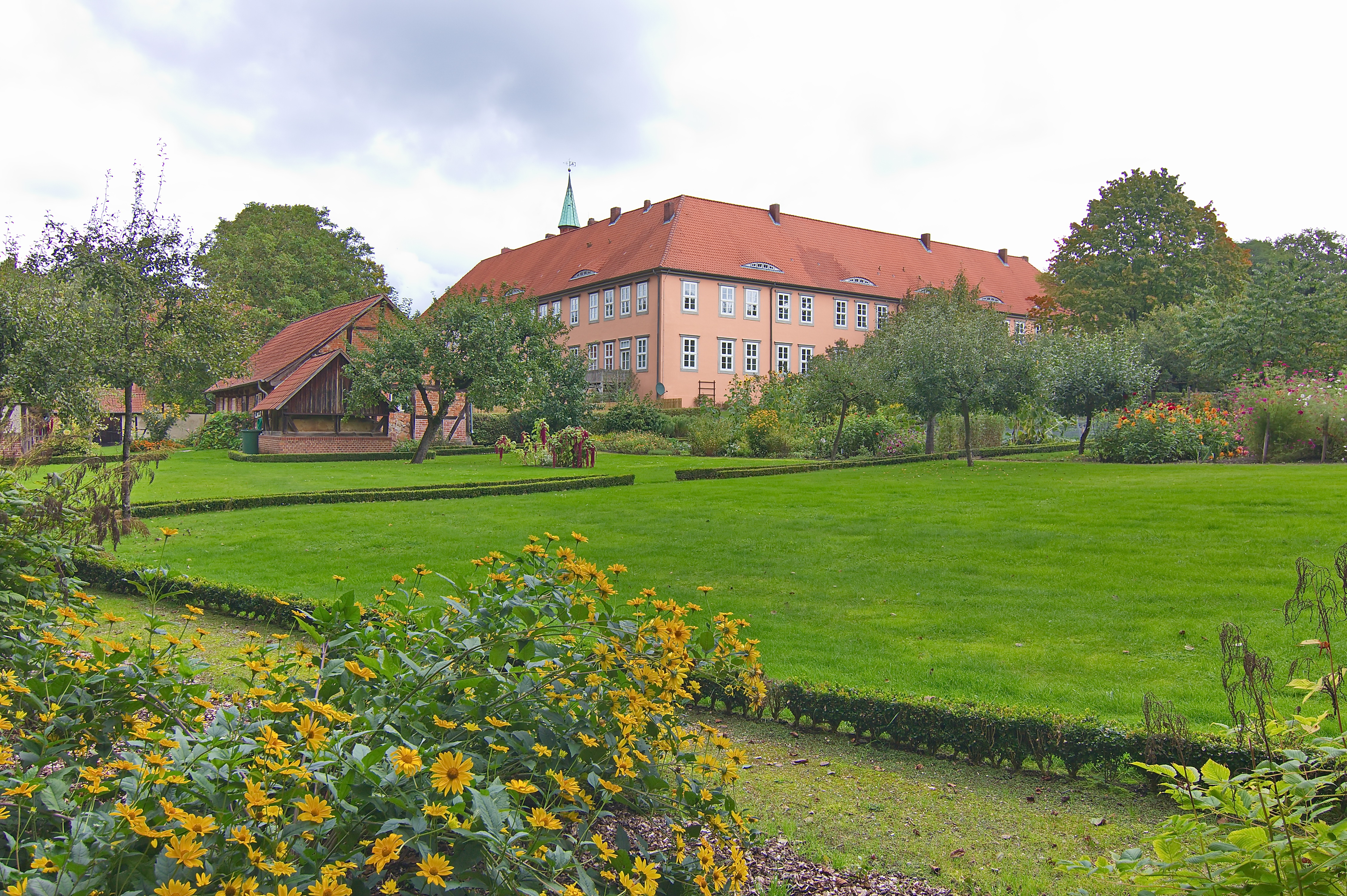
Old monastery

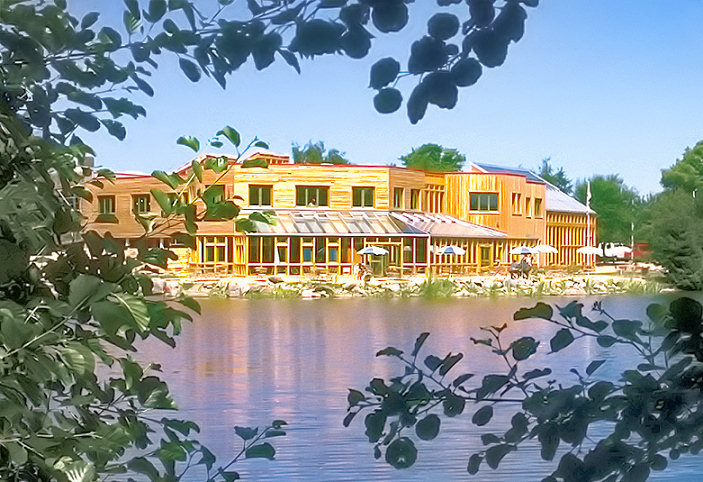
Main building of the Otter Centre

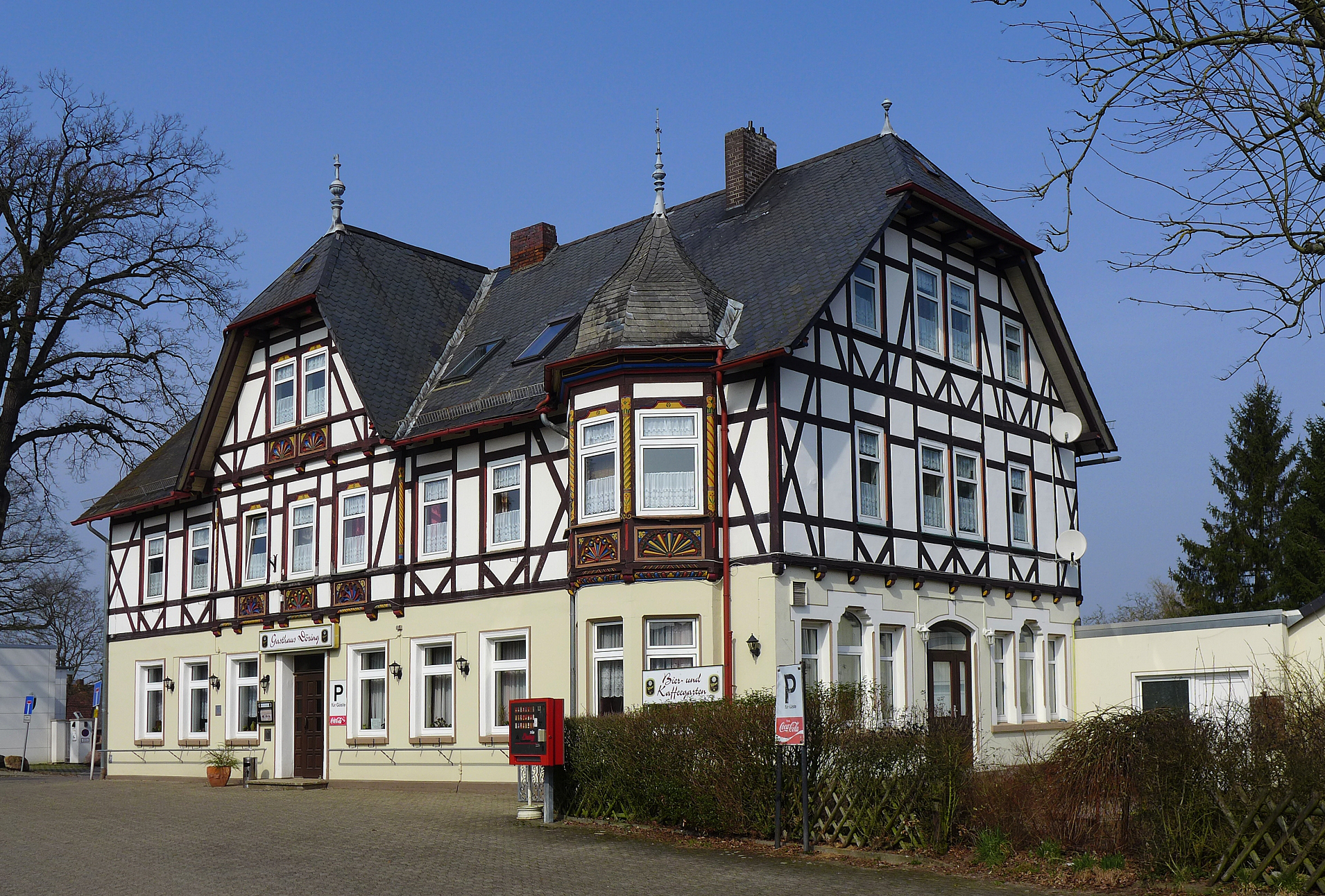
Inn

== History ==
Historically, Hankensbüttel belongs to the group of Büttel villages. The first mention of the village comes from a document by Emperor Henry III from 1051, in which it is verifiably mentioned as "Honengesbuthele." At that time, the Billung dynasty, followers of the Holy Roman Emperor, ruled the region. Located on important military and trade routes, it quickly experienced favorable development. A noble estate offered protection, the existence of which is suspected as early as the 10th century, while Conradus Honeskesbutle is documented as the lord of the castle in the 13th century. As early as the 11th century, Hankensbüttel was the center of an extensive parish and the seat of the episcopal court of the Diocese of Hildesheim. By the middle of the 12th century, a Gohgericht (court of the courts) and a Gohgräfenhof (court of the counts). After the Billungers died out in 1106, the region came under the rule of the Guelphs, and from 1267 onwards to the Lüneburg line.

During the Thirty Years' War, Hankensbüttel lay in the transit area of the fighting troops, and at times the church was used as an army camp and horse stable. In the 18th and 19th centuries, the town experienced the eventful history of the Hanoverian dynasty. During the Seven Years' War (1756–1763), as well as during the period of the Kingdom of Westphalia (1807–1813), Hankensbüttel was under French rule, and from 1866 onwards it belonged to Prussia. As a result of the Prussian district reform in 1885, Hankensbüttel, which at that time had approximately 1,200 inhabitants, was incorporated into the newly created Isenhagen district, which was absorbed into the Gifhorn district in 1933. In 1904, Hankensbüttel was connected to the Celle–Wittingen railway line. Passenger traffic on this line was discontinued in 1974.

Since 1974, Hankensbüttel has been the administrative seat of the municipality of the same name.

=== Origins of the name ===
Old names of the place are 1051 Honengesbvthele, 1221 Honekesbutle, 1364 Honkesbutle and 1567 Hankensbüttel.

Formed from a personal name Honik or Honing, a suffixed short name. Kaufmann considers the short name Hon(i) to be an ablaut form of the personal name root han, along with Old Saxon, Middle Low German "chicken." According to Kaufmann, Hon in PN means "singer." The short name is derived either with a strongly inflected k-suffix (see Barsbüttel) or, according to the first evidence, with -ing- (see Allingbüttel). Since -ing- generally appears as -igg- or in East Westphalia, and -eng- is only documented twice, a k-suffix is more likely. In the second part, Old Saxon (gi)butli "settlement."

=== Incorporations ===
On September 25, 1928, the Prussian State Ministry decided that the municipality of Hankensbüttel should be dissolved and merged with the also-dissolved municipality of Isenhagen to form a new municipality called "Isenhagen-Hankensbüttel." By decree of the Lower Saxony Minister of the Interior on April 22, 1949, the name of the municipality of Isenhagen-Hankensbüttel was changed to Hankensbüttel, a name that remains in effect to this day.

In the course of the administrative reform in Lower Saxony, which took place on 1 March 1974, the previously independent municipalities of Alt Isenhagen and Emmen were incorporated into the municipality of Hankensbüttel.

=== Population development ===
Year	Population
01.12.1905	1723
16.06.1925	2114
16.06.1933	2235
29.10.1946	4117
06.06.1961	4119
27.05.1970	3978
31.12.1989	3927
31.12.2009	4365
31.12.2010	4350
31.12.2011	4298
31.12.2015	4385
31.12.2017	4491

== Politics ==
=== Administration ===
Hankensbüttel is also the seat of the Samtgemeinde Hankensbüttel ("collective municipality"), which consists of the following municipalities:

- Dedelstorf
- Hankensbüttel
- Obernholz
- Sprakensehl
- Steinhorst

=== Community council ===
The Community council consists of 15 community members and was elected on 10 September 2006:

- CDU - 7 Seats
- SPD - 2 Seats
- Green Party - 2 Seats
- FDP - 2 Seats
- Independent - 2 Seats
