= List of hills of Hamburg =

This List of hills of Hamburg shows a selection of hills in the German federal state Hamburg − sorted by height in metres above sea level (NN):

Hill	Height	Quarter	Location	Features	Geo-coordinates	Picture
Hasselbrack	116.2	Neugraben-Fischbek	Harburg Hills		53.431667°N 9.865°E	
Baursberg	91.6	Blankenese			53.555861°N 9.81622°E	
Waseberg	87.0	Blankenese			53.562699°N 9.798206°E	
Tafelberg	82	Rissen				
Reiherberg	79.2	Heimfeld	Hamburg State Forest			
Müllberg Hummelsbüttel	76	Hummelsbüttel		Highest man-made hill		
Süllberg	74.64	Blankenese			53.559494°N 9.800792°E	
Bredenberg	69.8	Hausbruch	Neugraben Heath			
Kaiserstuhl	65	Heimfeld	Hamburg State Forest			
Falkenberg	64.8	Hausbruch	Neugraben Heath			
Wulmsberg	64	Hausbruch				
Mellenberg	63.3	Volksdorf	Volksdorf Forest		53.638889°N 10.1775°E	
Fuchsberg	60	Rönneburg				
Scheinberg	60	Neugraben-Fischbek	Neugraben Heath			
Waasenberg/e	47	Heimfeld	Heimfeld Wood			
Opferberg	46	Neugraben-Fischbek	Neugraben Heath			
Burgberg	45	Rönneburg				
Gojenberg	40	Bergedorf		Hamburg Observatory		
Deponie Georgswerder	ca. 40	Wilhelmsburg	Georgswerder	Rubbish tip being converted into an "energy hill" ("Energieberg")		
Sander Tannen	38	Lohbrügge		with Sander Dickkopp water tower and Hamburg-Lohbrügge Communications Tower	53°29′59″N 10°11′32″E	
Schanzenberg	38	Hausbruch	Hamburg State Forest			
Reiherhügel	27	Heimfeld	Heimfeld Wood			

== See also ==
- List of the highest mountains in Germany
- List of the highest mountains in the German states
- List of mountain and hill ranges in Germany
