= Eduard Bargheer =

German painter

Eduard Bargheer (25 December 1901 – 1 July 1979) was a German painter and printmaker. His early oeuvre had a close affinity to Expressionism.

== Life and work ==
Eduard Bargheer was born in Finkenwerder, Hamburg as son of Karl Bargheer, a primary school headmaster, and grew up together with his elder brother Ernst Bargheer (pedagogue and, later, ethnologist) and his five sisters. His father died in 1914, his mother in 1919. Ernst Bargheer, 24 years old at the time, assumed the guardianship of his younger brother and sisters and at his insistence Eduard trained to become a primary school teacher. During these early years, Eduard Bargheer not only benefited from his artistic training at the college of arts and crafts in Hamburg-Lerchenfeld but also embarked upon his own private studies, which he continued throughout his entire life. In 1924, the two brothers, Ernst and Eduard, fell out with one another, and Eduard set his own course toward becoming a painter.

In 1925, Bargheer visited Italy for the first time, where he spent a long time in Florence. His deep affection for Italy and its culture was to be a principal theme of his life. Extended travels to Paris followed in 1926 and 1927. In 1928, Bargheer built himself a studio close to the Westerdeich in Finkenwerder. In 1929, he became a member of the Hamburg Secession. It was about this time that he became closely involved in the circles around the art historians Aby Warburg and Erwin Panofsky. In 1932/33, Bargheer used a grant from the City of Hamburg to live in Paris for several months, and there he made friends with Heinrich Heydenreich, a student of Panofsky's.

In 1933, the Hamburg Secession disbanded of its own accord, for it did not wish to exclude its Jewish members, as the Nazi Party required. Bargheer visited Switzerland in 1935 and met Paul Klee there. In the same year he bought a small fisherman's cottage – now the Bargheer Haus – on the slopes of the Süllberg in Blankenese, Hamburg. Four years later, in 1939, Bargheer left Germany for Ischia. After the war, he took part in documenta I in Kassel in 1955 and in documenta II in 1959.

He was made an honorary citizen of Forio/Ischia in 1948; while still retaining his German nationality, he received Italian citizenship in 1951. He died in Blankenese, Hamburg in 1979.

== Reception ==
Bargheer is known above all for his landscape watercolours, which are distinguished by a light-coloured, crystalline style. His combinations of the abstract and the figural evoke associations with the works of Paul Klee and Werner Gilles.

== See also ==
- List of German painters

== Bibliography ==
- Dieter Honisch (Foreword): 1945 1985. Kunst in der Bundesrepublik Deutschland, (Nationalgalerie, Staatliche Museen, Preußischer Kulturbesitz, Berlin), Nicolaische Verlagsbuchhandlung, Berlin 1985, ISBN 3-87584-158-1
- Volker Plagemann: Eduard Bargheer, from the series: Hamburger Köpfe, published by the ZEIT Stiftung Ebelin und Gerd Bucerius, Hamburg 2008, ISBN 978-3-8319-0324-5
