= Brunsberg (Harburg) =

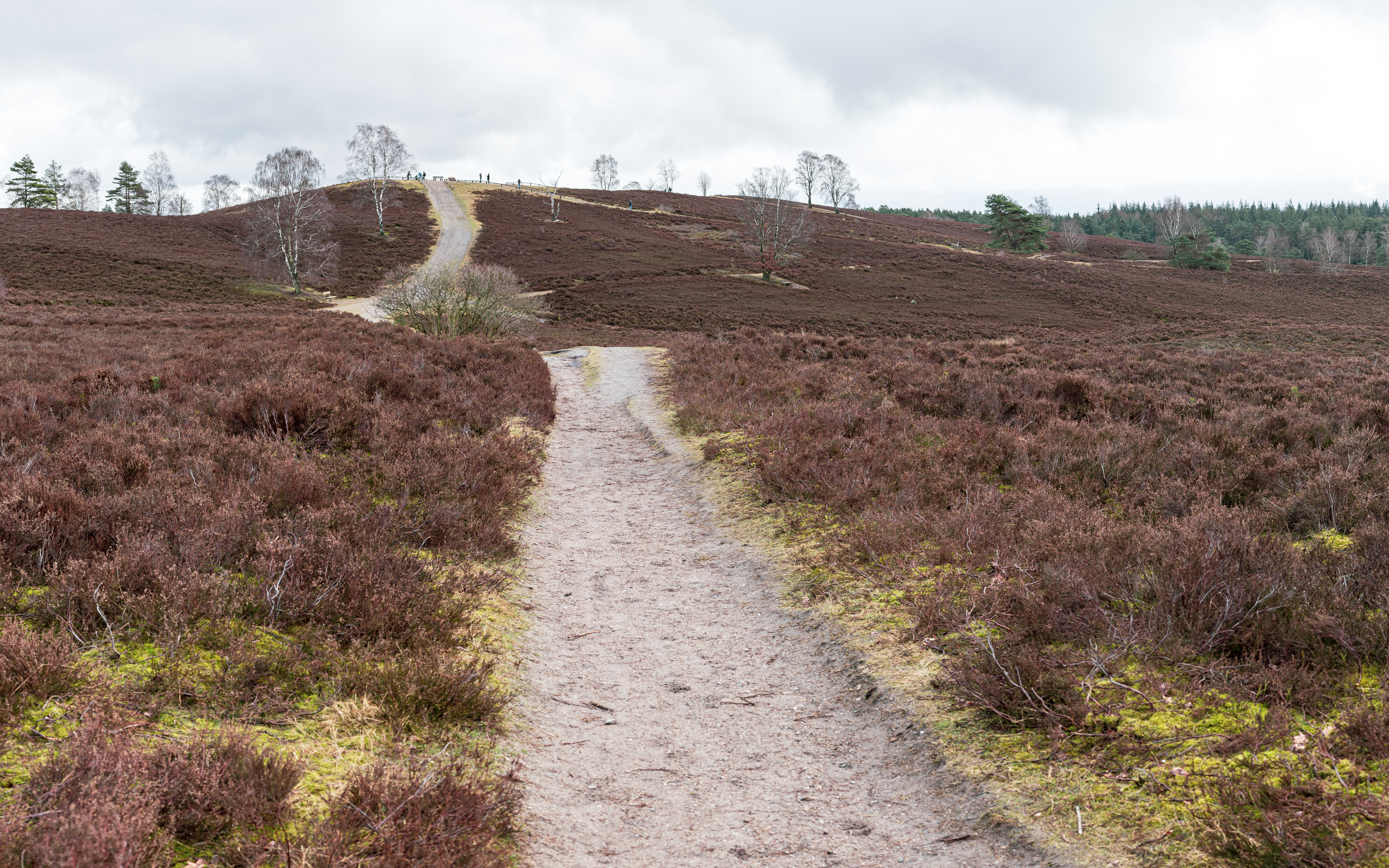
- View of the Brunsberg

Highest point
- Elevation: 129 m (423 ft)
- Coordinates: 53°17′55″N 9°49′59″E

Geography
- Location within Lower Saxony
- Location: Lower Saxony, Germany

The Brunsberg is a 129 metres (423 ft) high hill on the northwestern edge of the Lüneburg Heath in northern Germany. It lies in the Brunsberg Nature Reserve, reserve no. LÜ 010 with an area of 60.6 hectares (150 acres), near Sprötze between the towns of Buchholz in der Nordheide and Tostedt.

== Features ==
From its summit, covered with heather and grazed by moorland sheep, in good visibility the Wilseder Berg, 169 metres (554 ft), and Heidepark at Soltau can be seen to the south. To the southwest the tower of St. John's Church (Johanneskirche) can be seen in Tostedt. The view towards Hamburg is blocked by the Harburg Hills. Not far from the top is the holiday home for the youth organisation Deutsche Schreberjugend Landesverband Hamburg eV.
