= Nordheide =

Northern part of the Lüneburg Heath, Germany

The Nordheide (German pronunciation: [ˈnɔʁthaɪdə], lit. 'North Heath') is the northernmost part of the Lüneburg Heath in Germany. It runs from the Harburg Hills to the municipality of Handeloh. South of that lies the Lüneburg Heath Nature Park and the Südheide with the Südheide Nature Park. The highest point on the Nordheide is the Brunsberg near Buchholz in der Nordheide which has a height of 129.5 metres (425 ft).
