= Sprötze =

- Ortsteil of Buchholz in der Nordheide
- Interactive map of Sprötze
- Location within Germany Location within Lower Saxony
- Coordinates: 53°18′33.88″N 9°48′22.04″E
- Country: Germany
- State: Lower Saxony
- District: Harburg
- Town: Buchholz in der Nordheide
- Elevation: 55–99 m (180–325 ft)

Population (2020)
  - Total: 2,542
- Time zone: UTC+01:00 (CET)
  - Summer (DST): UTC+02:00 (CEST)
- Postal codes: 21244
- Dialling codes: 04186

The former independent municipality of Sprötze in the north German state of Lower Saxony was merged in 1972 with another five villages into the town of Buchholz in der Nordheide.

== Transportation ==
The village of Sprötze lies on the B 3 federal road between Trelde and Welle. Sprötze has a station on the main line from Bremen to Hamburg, and is part of the Hamburg Transport Network.

== History ==
Sprötze was first mentioned in 1105 as Sproccinla. At that time the inhabitants had just celebrated the 900th anniversary of their village. Its name changed over the course of time through Spretzenlo, Sprotzelo, Sprotzel and Sprötzel to the present-day name of Sprötze. Sprötze has a fine brick church from the last century.

== Features ==
One of the highest elevations in north Germany is located near Sprötze: the Brunsberg south of the village is 129.5 metres (425 ft) above sea level. From here the Nordheide ("North Heath") can be viewed.

The Sprötze shooting festival takes place on the second weekend of August, finishing with a big firework display.

In 1992 in Sprötze the VooV Experience was first held. Since 2001, however, it has moved to Putlitz.

In his book Der tiefere Sinn des Labenz, Sven Böttcher describes Sprötze as a "mixture of toothpaste and spit in a basin".

== Sport ==
Sprötze shares a football club, Sg Estetal ("Este Valley Sports Club"), with the village of Trelde. Another club, TSV-Sprötze has a range of sporting activities and even dancing classes.

Sprötze and the neighbouring village of Kakenstorf have a shooting club offering archery, clay pigeon shooting, small arms and air gun shooting.
