= Kiekeberg =

- Location within Lower Saxony

Highest point
- Elevation: 127.1 m above sea level (NN) (417 ft)
- Coordinates: 53°26′13″N 9°53′58″E

Geography
- Location: Lower Saxony, Germany
- Parent range: Harburg Hills

The Kiekeberg is, at 127.1 metres above sea level, one of the more prominent hills in the Harburg Hills in north Germany. It is located in the parish of Ehestorf in the municipality of Rosengarten in the district of Harburg in the southern foothills of the range, which is also known as The Black Hills (Die Schwarzen Berge), near the southern state boundary of Hamburg.
