= Bettina Walter =

German documentary film producer

- Born: Bettina Stephanie Walter; February 13, 1971 (age 55); Buchholz in der Nordheide, Lower Saxony, Germany
- Education: University of Hamburg
- Occupation: Documentary Producer
- Years active: 2005 – Present
- Organization: Bettina Walter Production (BWP)
- Website: www.bw-production.com

Bettina Stephanie Walter (born February 13, 1971) is a German documentary film producer.

Her works as producer include The Forum (German: Das Forum, winner of the 2020 German Business Film Prize (de)), Falciani's Tax Bomb (nominated for the 2015 German Film Award for Best Documentary Film and the Grimme Online Award for Best Documentary), Google and the World Brain (official selection in the Sundance World Cinema competition), and The Light Bulb Conspiracy (es) (winner of the 2011 Ondas Award for International Television).

== Education and career ==
Walter graduated with a master's degree in anthropology, politics, romance languages and Latin American studies from the University of Hamburg.

Since 2000, Walter has taught documentary filmmaking, project development and international co-production for several educational institutions including the Autonomous University of Barcelona, the University of Barcelona, the International University of Catalunya, the Film Academy Baden-Württemberg and ECIB Film School of Barcelona.

In 2016, the Goethe-Institut and Documentary Campus in collaboration with Walter and BWP founded Campus Latino, a non-profit training programme for filmmakers from Latin America, Spain, Italy and Portugal. The program focusses on creative development, assists in finding financial partners, and explores "innovative distribution strategies" for the international marketplace.

Her works as coproducer include Theatre of War (Spanish: Teatro de Guerra, winner of the CICAE Award at the Berlin International Film Festival), and Mañana al Mar (winner of the 2006 Prix Europa for Non-Fiction).

== Filmography ==
Year	Title	Role	Notes
2005	The Devil's Miner	Co-producer	Awards: Hot Docs FIPRESCI Award; Tribeca Film Festival Best Documentary Filmmakers Special Mention; PBS Independent Lens Audience Award; (Nominated) European Film Academy Arte Award
2006	Mañana al Mar	Co-producer	Awards: Prix Europa for Best Non-Fiction; Max Ophüls Festival (de) Best Documentary Prize; It's All True Sao Paulo Film Festival (pt) Best Documentary; Achtung Berlin Film Festival Best Documentary; Festivals: Documenta Madrid, Spain; L’Alternativa, Spain; Montreal International Documentary Festival
2008	My Life with Carlos	Co-producer	Awards: Hot Docs Audience Top Ten; Gramado Film Festival Best International Film; Biarritz Latin America Latin Union Documentary Award; San Diego Latino Film Festival Best Film; (Nominated) Grimme Award
2010	The Light Bulb Conspiracy	Producer	Awards: Premios Ondas for International Television; Spanish Television Academy Best Documentary; Filmambiente Brazil(es) 'Best Feature Documentary'; Festival du Film Vert Suisse Best Environmental Documentary; (Nominated) Focal International Awards; (Nominated) Prix Europa Best Documentary; Festivals: World Premiere – Rotterdam International Film Festival
2012	The Lithium Revolution	Co-producer	Awards: Herbert Quandt Award(de); Festivals: IFF World of Knowledge, Official Section. St Petersburg, Russia; Ecofalante Environmental Film Festival, Brazil; Life Science Festival, Prague, Czech Republic; International Science Film Festival Pariscience, France; FIFEL Festival International du Film Sur Energie, Switzerland; Festival Film Vert, France and Switzerland; One Earth Film Festival, Illinois, USA; Ahvaz International Science Film Festival, Iran
2013	Google and the World Brain	Producer	Awards: Rincón Film Festival Best Documentary; (Nominated) Sundance World Cinema competition; Festivals: Dok.Fest Munich
2015	Falciani's Tax Bomb	Producer	Awards: German Business Film Prize (German: Deutscher Wirtschaftsfilmpreis) for Best in New Media; (Nominated) German Film Award for Best Documentary Film; German-French Journalism Award; (Nominated) Grimme Online Award for Informative Film
2018	Theatre of War	Co-producer	Awards: CICAE Award at the 2018 Berlin International Film Festival; BAFICI Best Director; Movistar Award; (Nominated) Fenix Award for Best Documentary; Festivals: World Premiere – Berlinale; CPH-DOX; SXSW
2019	The Forum	Producer	Awards: German Business Film Prize (German: Deutscher Wirtschaftsfilmpreis); (Nominated) Rose d’Or Documentary Award; Festivals: DOK Leipzig; IDFA Amsterdam; Hot Docs
