= Tötensen =

- Village of Rosengarten
- Coat of arms
- Interactive map of Tötensen
- Location within Germany Location within Lower Saxony
- Country: Germany
- State: Lower Saxony
- District: Harburg
- Municipality: Rosengarten
- Time zone: UTC+01:00 (CET)
  - Summer (DST): UTC+02:00 (CEST)
- Postal codes: 21224
- Dialling codes: 04108
- Vehicle registration: WL

Tötensen is a village near Hamburg, Germany. The village belongs to the municipality of Rosengarten (district of Harburg).
