= Haußelberg =

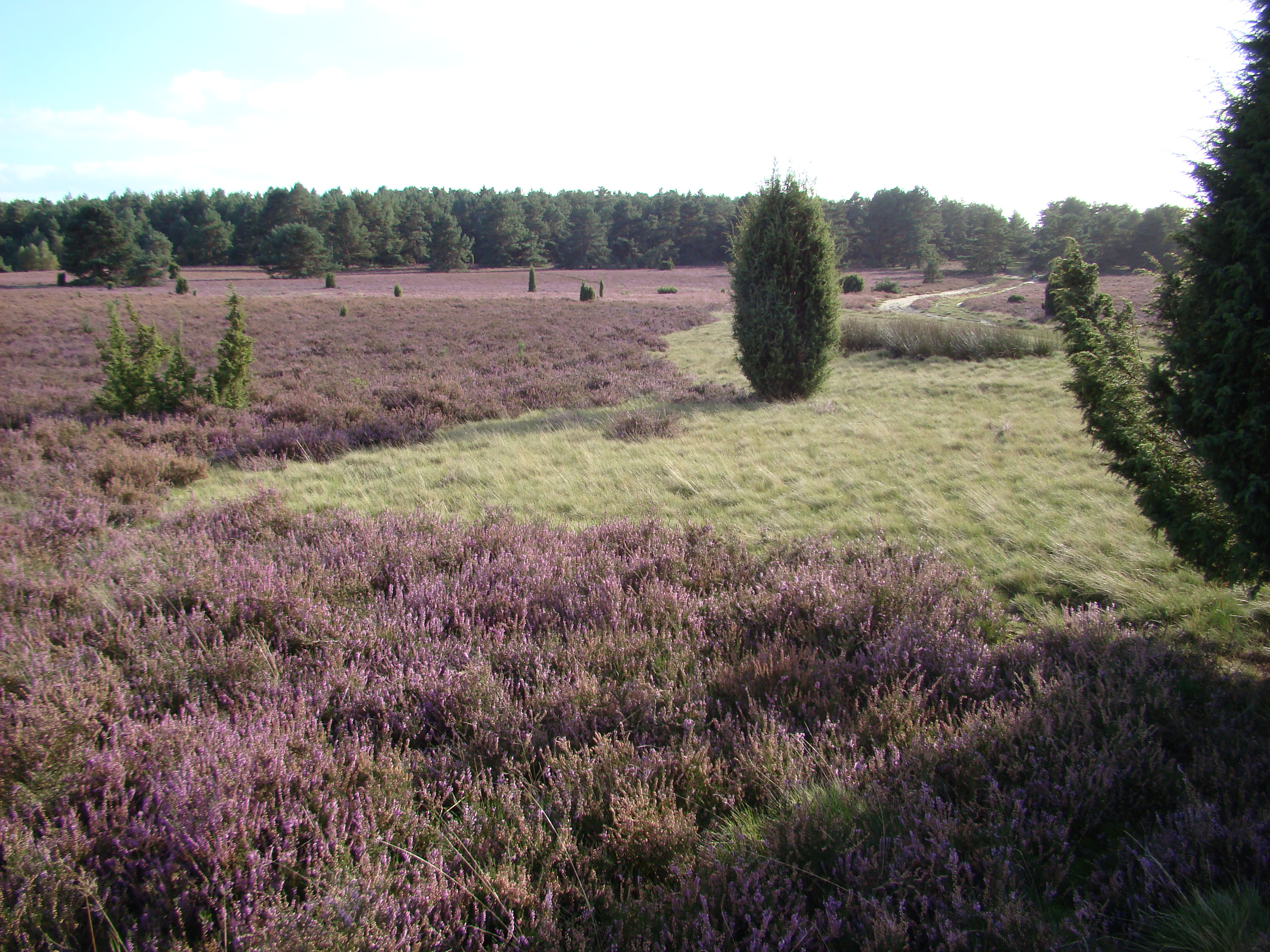
- Heathland near the Haußelberg

Highest point
- Elevation: 118 m above sea level (NN) (387 ft)
- Coordinates: 52°51′26″N 10°11′15″E

Geography
- Location within Lower Saxony
- Location: Lüneburger Heide

The Haußelberg is a hill, 119.1 metres (391 ft) above NN, in the Lüneburg Heath in the north German district of Celle. It is a popular viewing point in the otherwise very flat terrain of the Südheide Nature Park.

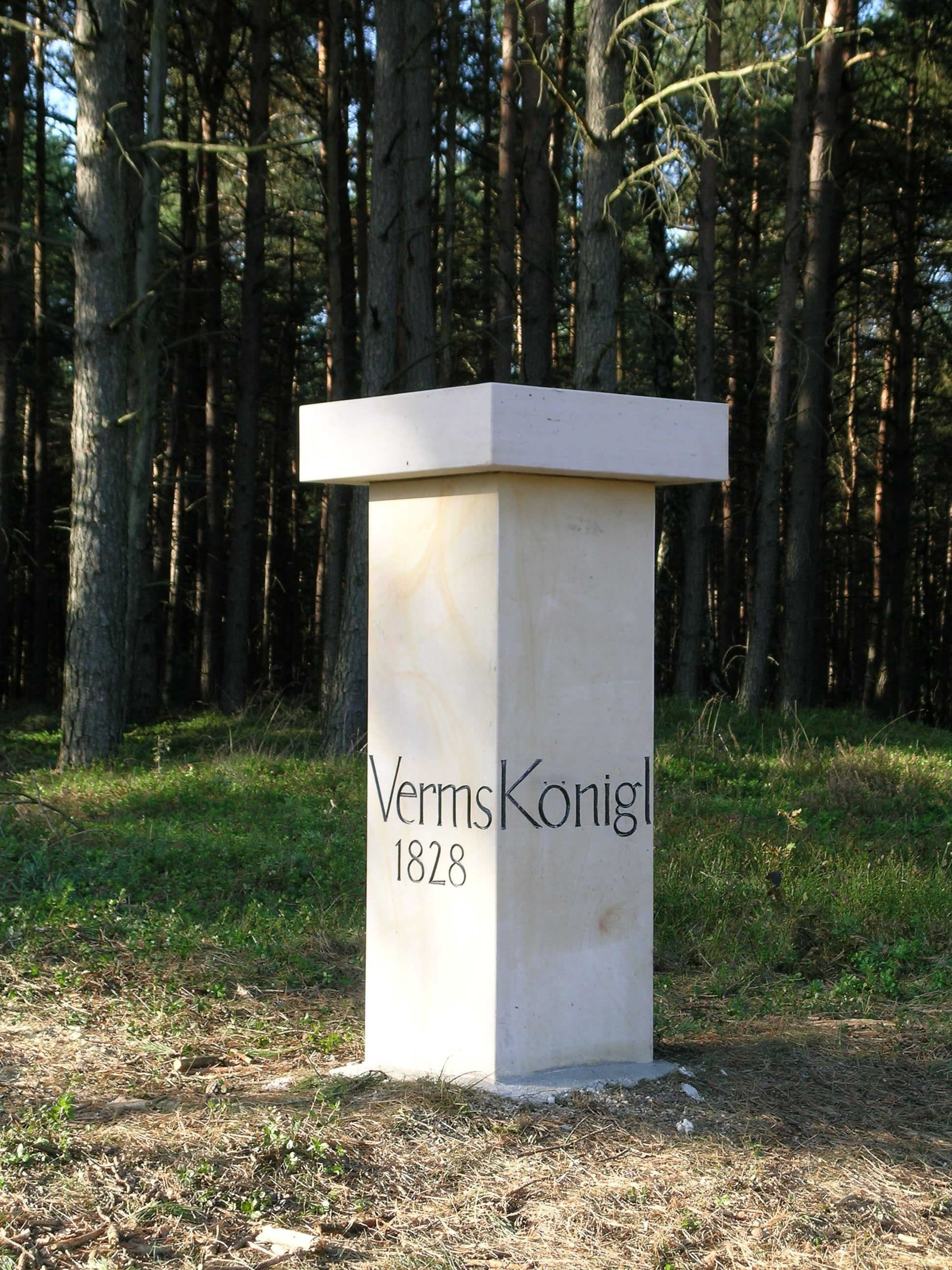
New trig point on the Haußelberg

In 1820 George IV of the United Kingdom tasked the Professor of Astronomy and Director of the Observatory at Göttingen University, Carl Friedrich Gauss, to survey the Kingdom of Hanover. The mathematician Gauss used the summit of the Haußelberg as one of the triangulation stations for his land surveys, triangulating it to the Falkenberg, 150 metres (490 ft) AMSL, further west near Wardböhmen and to the Wilseder Berg, 169 metres (554 ft) AMSL, to the north. Another triangle was formed by the Haußelberg, the Falkenberg and Breithorn (Breitenhorn), 117 metres (384 ft) AMSL, south of Unterlüß. It has to be deduced that these points - the Breithorn, Haußelberg and Falkenberg - which are all hidden by woods today, were then on open, unforested hilltops, probably surrounded by heathland. Not until the large, systematic afforestation in the 2nd half of the 19th century did today's wooded hilltops emerge.

In 2005 a new trig point was erected on the Haußelberg, near the original stone.

Part of the triangulation network used for Gauss's survey was pictured on the reverse side of the 4th series of 10 Deutschmark banknotes.

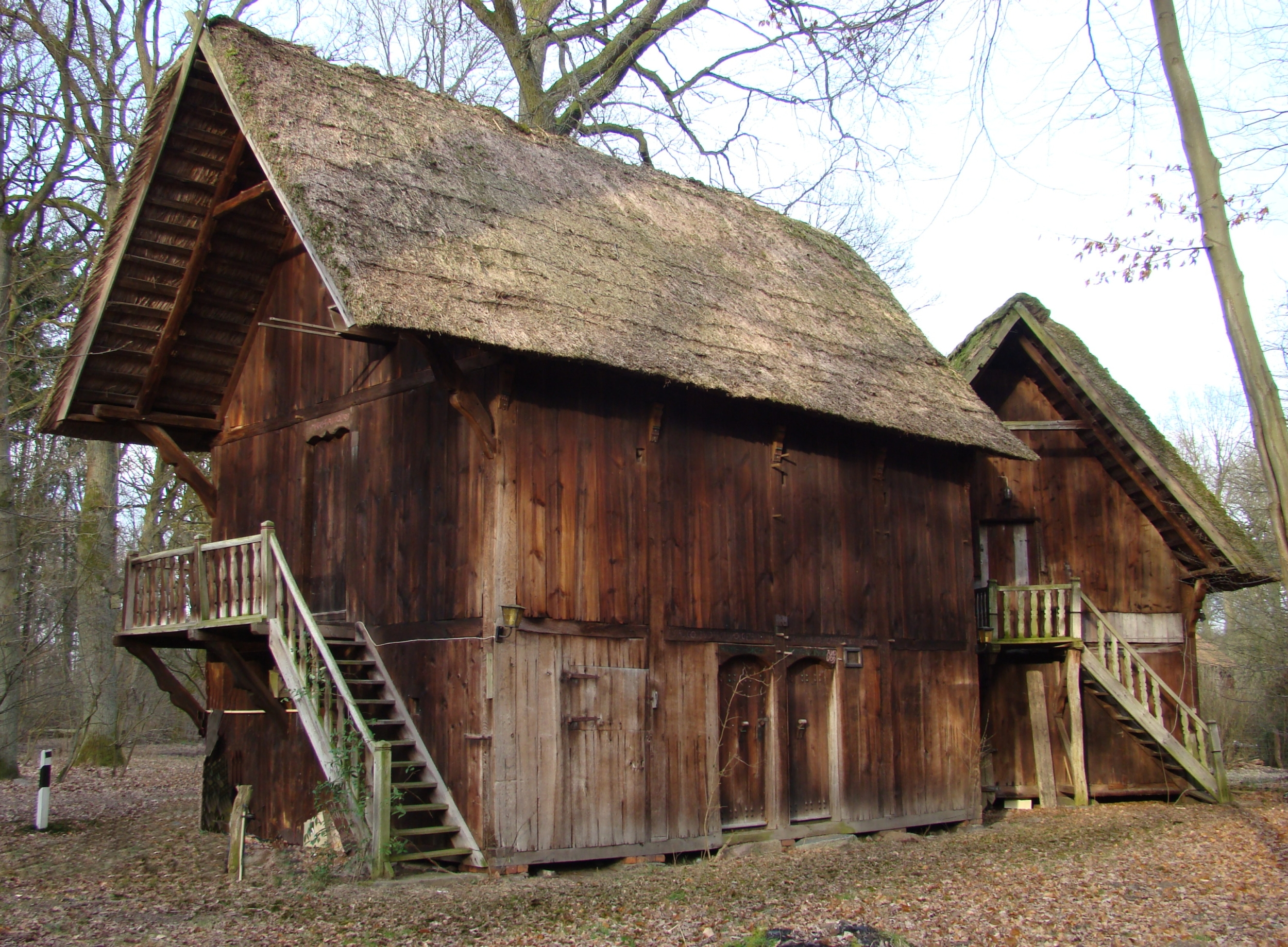
Treppenspeicher at the farm of Hof von der Ohe in Oberohe

Whilst he surveyed from the Haußelberg, Gauss lived for 10 days on the farm of von der Ohe in Oberohe (today in the municipality of Faßberg). In a letter to his friend Dr. Olbers he wrote:

...there lived a family, whose head Peter Hinrich von der Ohe who spells his name zur Ohe, whose property is perhaps a square mile in area, but whose children look after the pigs. They have no comforts at all, such as a mirror, a toilet or the like ...

== References and footnotes ==
- Overview of the surveyed triangulation systems
