= Google and the World Brain =

2013 documentary

- Film poster
- Directed by: Ben Lewis
- Produced by: Fiona O'Doherty; Viva Van Loock; Bettina Walter
- Starring: Sergey Brin; Dan Clancy; Mary Sue Coleman; Amit Singhal; Brewster Kahle
- Cinematography: Frank-Peter Lehmann
- Edited by: Simon Barker
- Music by: Lucas Ariel Vallejos
- Production companies: BBC; Polar Star Films; Arte
- Release date: 18 January 2013
- Running time: 90 minutes
- Countries: United Kingdom; Spain; Germany
- Languages: English; French; German; Spanish; Catalan

Google and the World Brain is a 2013 documentary movie about the Google Books Library Project directed by Ben Lewis, produced by BBC, Polar Star Films, and Arte. The main focus of the plot is on the copyright controversy caused by the project that resulted in the Google Book Search Settlement Agreement from Authors Guild, Inc. v. Google, Inc. in 2013.

The film features interviews with many figures concerned, including Creative Commons founder Lawrence Lessig, then-senior Vice President of Google Amit Singhal, and Internet Archive founder Brewster Kahle. The use of World Brain in the title is taken from the H. G. Wells' collection of essays called World Brain.

The film premiered at the 2013 Sundance Film Festival.

== Reception ==
In a positive review in The Hollywood Reporter stated that the documentary offered "convincing reasons to pay more attention to Google's utopian schemes." And the film raised a bigger question about artificial intelligence, "the more putting centuries' worth of books online becomes a project to create a near-omniscient artificial being," and if such a thing became a possibility could a single company or government be trusted to hold the reins.

== See also ==
- The Virtual Revolution, 2010 BBC film about Internet in whole
