= Waseberg =

Coordinates: 53.5622°N 9.7958°E

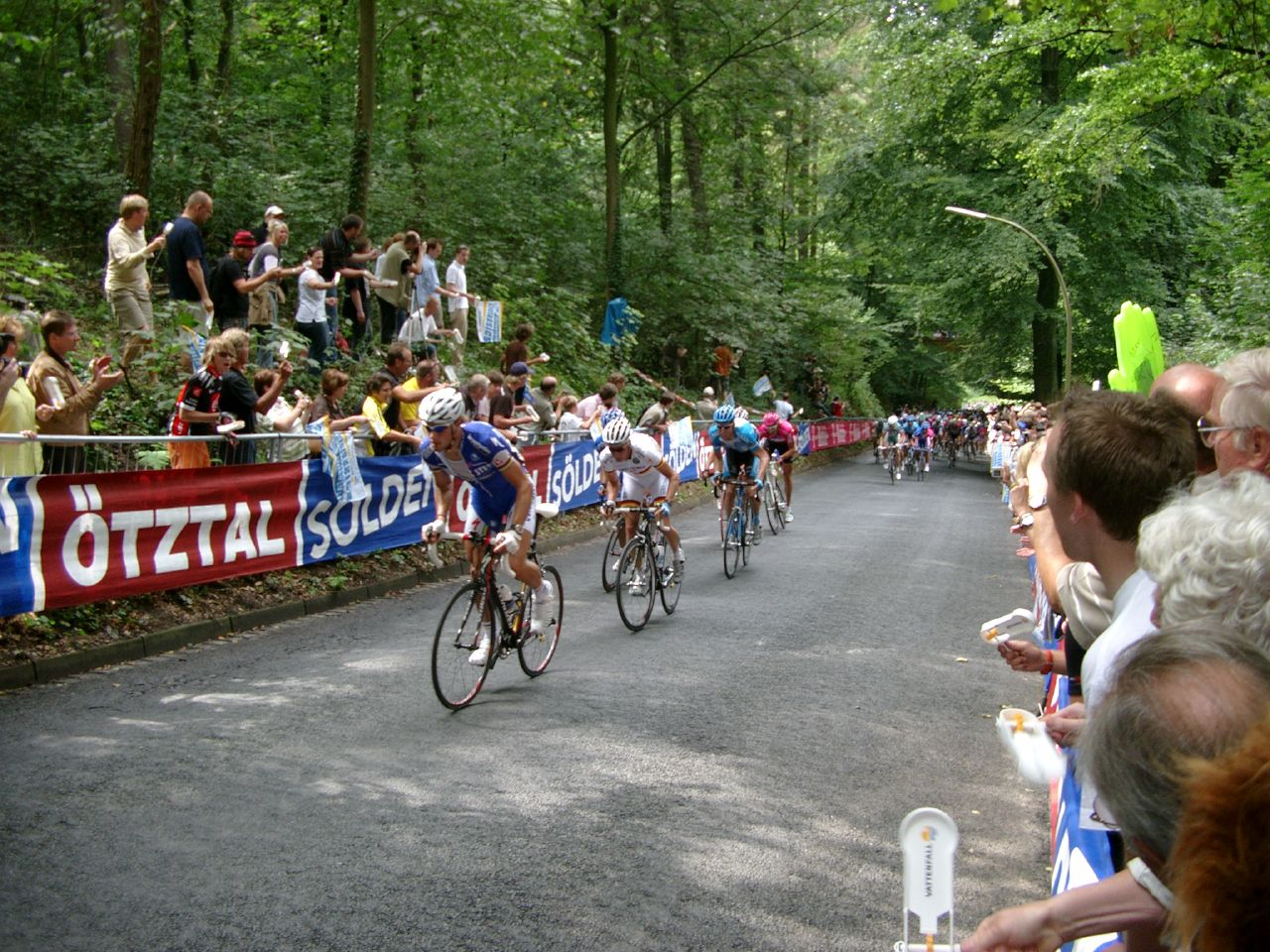
Waseberg during the 2007 Vattenfall Cyclassics

The Waseberg in Blankenese, Hamburg, Germany is with a height of 87 m above sea level (NN) the third highest peak of the city and the second highest of the quarter of Blankenese (behind Baursberg). It is part of a ridge on the north bank of the river Elbe.

The hill gained notoriety primarily by the steeply rising road of the same name to a small plateau near the hilltop as a challenge in cycling. In addition, the bus circle line 488 from Blankenese railway station, which is also climbing the hill on this road utilizing small buses, is nicknamed mountain goat (Bergziege) by the inhabitants of Blankenese.

== Cycling ==
The ascent of the Waseberg from the shore of the Elbe up to the village of Blankenese is with its 70 meters and an average slope of over 10% one of the steepest in Hamburg. Its length is approximately 700 meters. The first 400 meters run on the Falkentaler Weg with a slope of 5%. The actual Waseberg then starts after a sharp right curve. These last 300 meters have a slope of 16%.

The Waseberg therefore is being driven over since 1997 annually by the cycling world elite in the course of EuroEyes Cyclassics (until 2005 HEW Cyclassics, until 2015 Vattenfall Cyclassics), one of the two German World Tour races (the other is Eschborn–Frankfurt), several times. It is the main difficulty within the race. A public festival is usually taking place there as many viewers gather at the course and in front of a large video screen with a DJ/presenter as well as around the beer and ice cream stands.
