= Fulde =

Fulde may refer to:

- Fulde (Böhme), a river of Lower Saxony, Germany, tributary of the Böhme

== People with the surname ==
- Gordian Fulde (born 1948), Australian emergency medicine specialist
- Peter Fulde (born 1936), a physicist working in condensed matter theory and quantum chemistry
