= Falkenberg (Lüneburg Heath) =

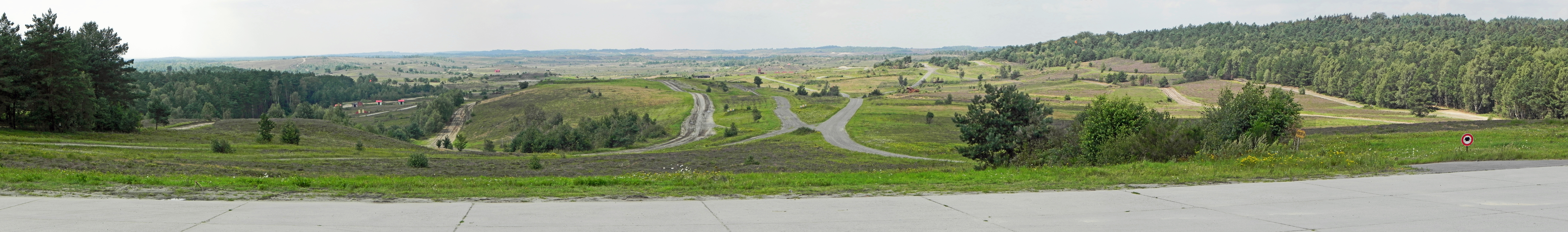
- View from the east of the Falkenberg (r) and the Oerbke end moraine with the Staffelberg (120 m)

Highest point
- Elevation: 150 m above sea level (NHN) (490 ft)
- Coordinates: 52°50′48″N 9°51′39″E

Geography
- Location within Lower Saxony
- Location: Lüneburger Heide

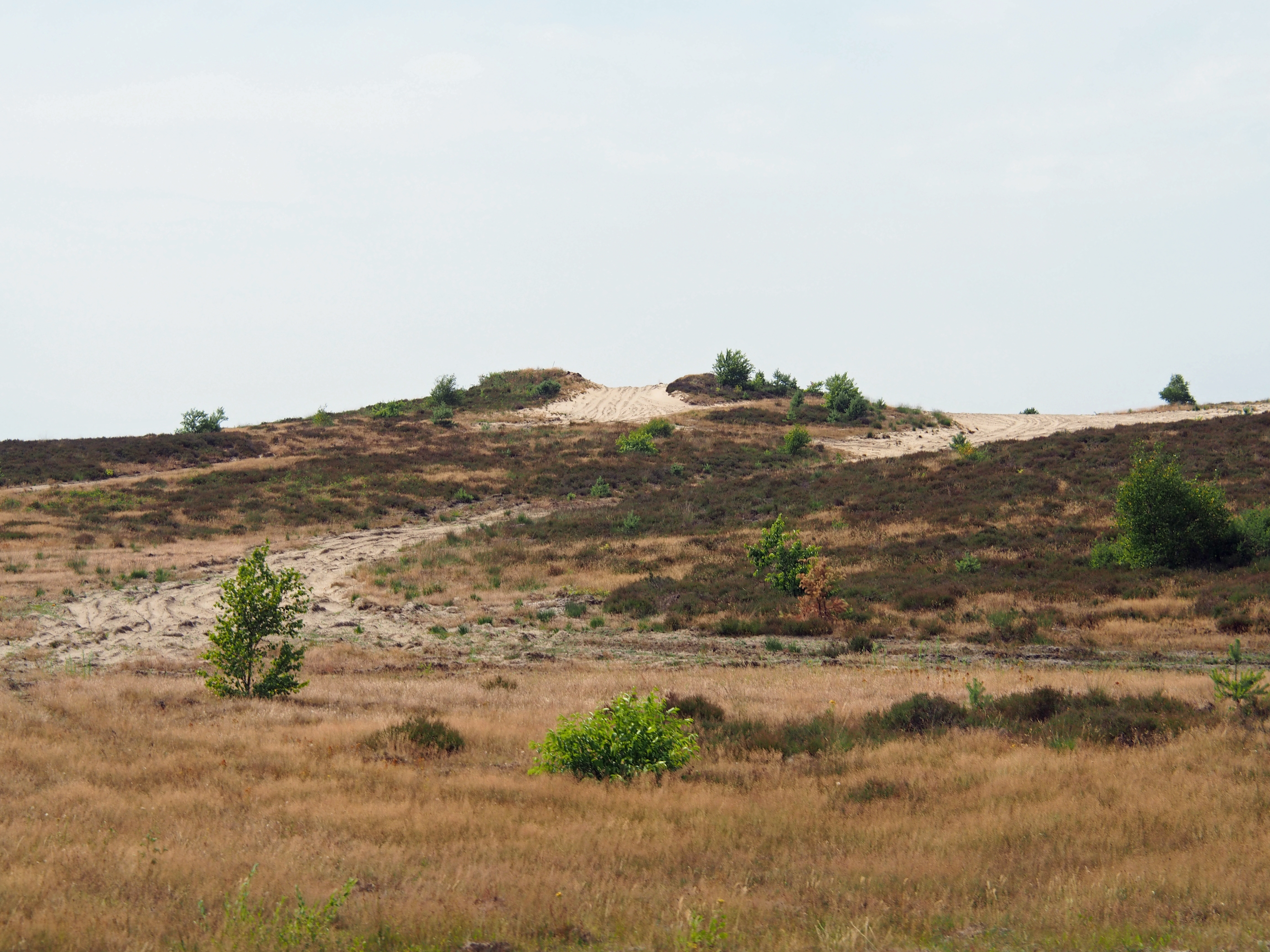
Hill ridge west of the Falkenberg, today a military out-of-bounds area

The Falkenberg (German pronunciation: [ˈfalkŋ̍ˌbɛʁk]) lies in the northwestern part of the district of Celle in northern Germany. It is one of the highest points on the Lüneburg Heath. In good weather Hanover is visible from its summit. It is on the terrain of the NATO facility, the Bergen-Hohne Training Area, in the vicinity of the village of Becklingen.

In 1820 King George IV the United Kingdom tasked the Professor of Astronomy and Director of the Observatory at Göttingen University, Carl Friedrich Gauss, to survey the Kingdom of Hanover. Gauss used the summit of Falkenberg, amongst others, as a triangulation station for his land surveys. Another central trig point was the Falkenberg (150 m über NN) which lay further south.

The Wilseder Berg (169 m above NN), further north, was another central trig point as was the Haußelberg to the east. The trig points of Haußelberg and Falkenberg, which today are hidden by woods, then lay on open, unforested hilltops, probably surrounded by heath. Not until the large systematic afforestation in the 2nd half of the 19th century did the landscape begin to look like it does today.

Part of the triangulation network used for Gauß's survey, depicting the Falkenberg, was represented on the reverse side of the 4th series of 10 Deutschmark banknotes.
