= Harburg Hills =

Low ridge in Germany

Harburg Hills Harburger Berge
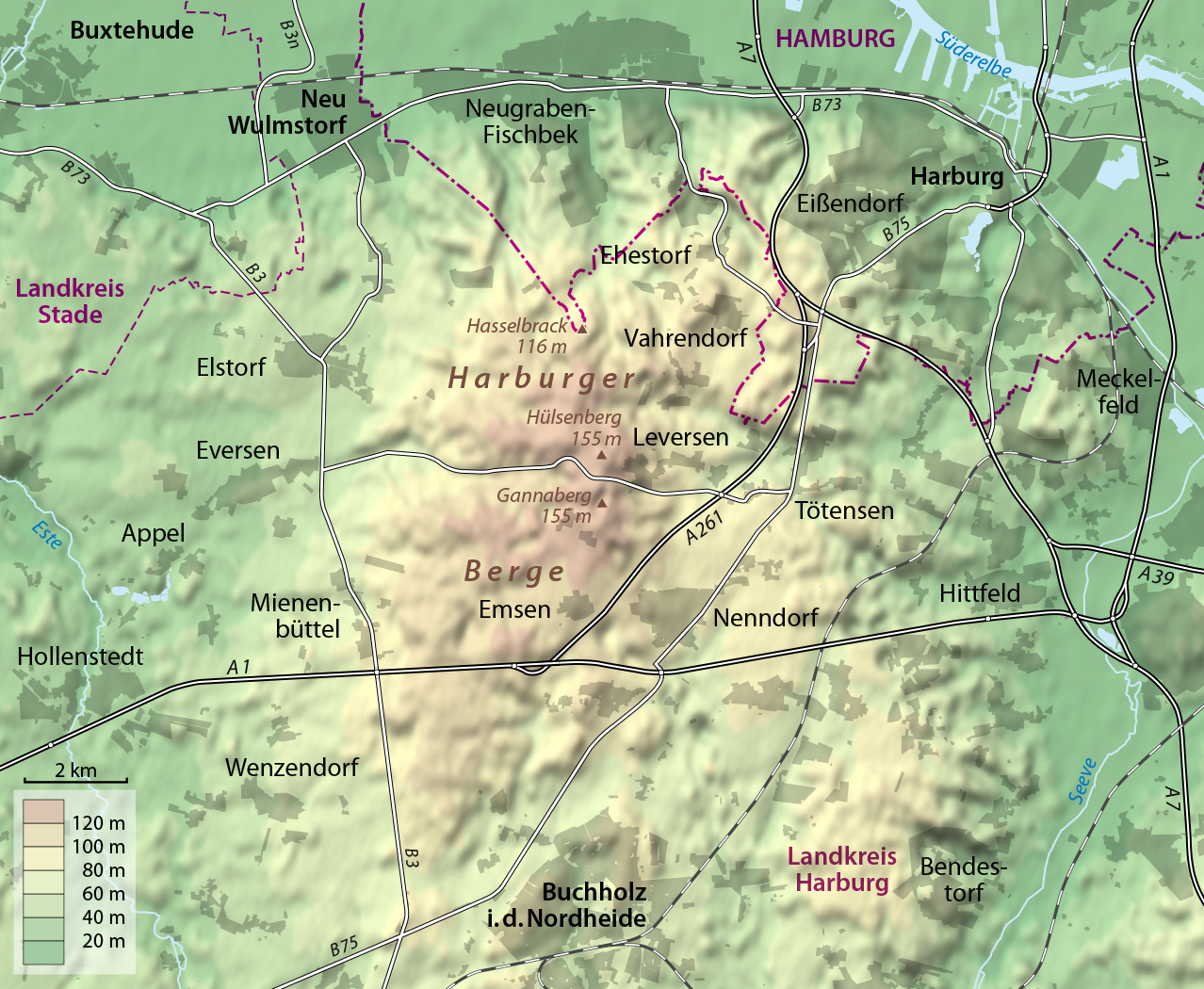
- Relief map

Highest point
- Peak: Hülsenberg
- Elevation: 155 m (509 ft)

Geography
- States: Germany: Lower Saxony; Hamburg
- Range coordinates: 53°25′21.82″N 9°51′13.34″E

The Harburg Hills (German: Harburger Berge) are a low ridge in the northeastern part of the German state of Lower Saxony and the southern part of the city state of Hamburg. They are up to 155 metres (509 ft) high.

== Geography and history ==
The Harburg Hills lie northwest of the Lüneburg Heath in the Lower Saxon district of Landkreis Harburg and in the Hamburg quarters of Eißendorf, Hausbruch, Heimfeld, Marmstorf and Neugraben-Fischbek within the Harburg borough. Thus they are located between the city of Hamburg to the north, Seevetal to the east, the Lüneburg Heath to the southeast, Handeloh, Welle and Otter to the south, Tostedt and Buchholz in der Nordheide to the southwest, Hollenstedt and Beckdorf to the west and Neu Wulmstorf to the northwest. At the centre of this hill country is the municipal district of Rosengarten (which consists of ten separate villages and covers an area of some 64 km² (25 sq. miles)). The geographic centre of the Harburg Hills is the Buchholz motorway (Autobahn) interchange on the A 1. The hills are framed by the Seeve river in the east and the Este river in the west.

The Harburg Hills are end moraines that were formed in the Saalian glaciation and Weichselian Ice Age. They are a popular recreation area.

== Terrain ==
The Harburg Hills form a landscape of hilly forests, heaths and farmland. They contain protected nature reserves: the Fischbeker Heide (Fischbek Heath, 1958), the Schwarze Berge (Black Hills), Buchenwälder im Rosengarten and Landschaftsschutzgebiet Rosengarten–Kiekeberg–Stuvenwald (1965), and Neugrabener Heide, as well as the Wildpark Schwarze Berge.

== Access ==
The area is crossed by the A 1 and A 261 Autobahns; junctions Neu Wulmstorf-Rade, Buchholz-Dibbersen (both on the A 1) and Rosengarten-Tötensen (A 261) enabling easy access to the hills. The A 7 runs through the northeastern part of the region; leave at the Marmstorf exit.

== Hills ==
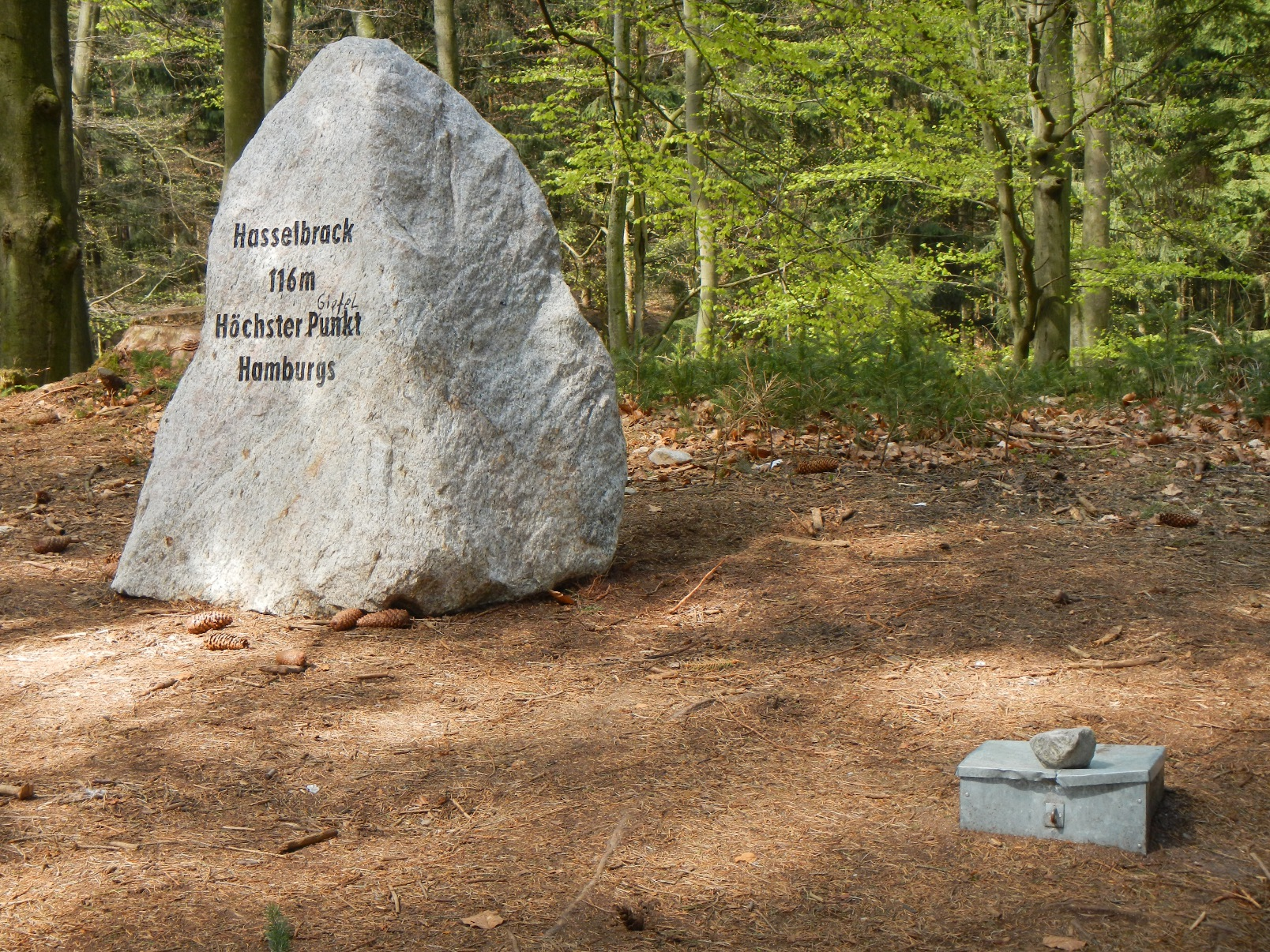
Summit obelisk on the Hasselbrack

- Gannaberg (155 m), Harburg district, Langenrehm village (with the Rosengarten radio and TV tower)
- Hülsenberg (155 m), Harburg district
- Brunsberg (129 m), Harburg district
- Kiekeberg (127 m), Harburg district, Black Hills (Schwarze Berge)
- Hasselbrack (116.2 m), highest elevation in Hamburg.
- Fistelberge (107 m), Harburg district, Black Hills
- Flidderberg (107 m), Harburg district, Lohberge
