= Wilseder Berg =

Mountain in Lower Saxony, Germany

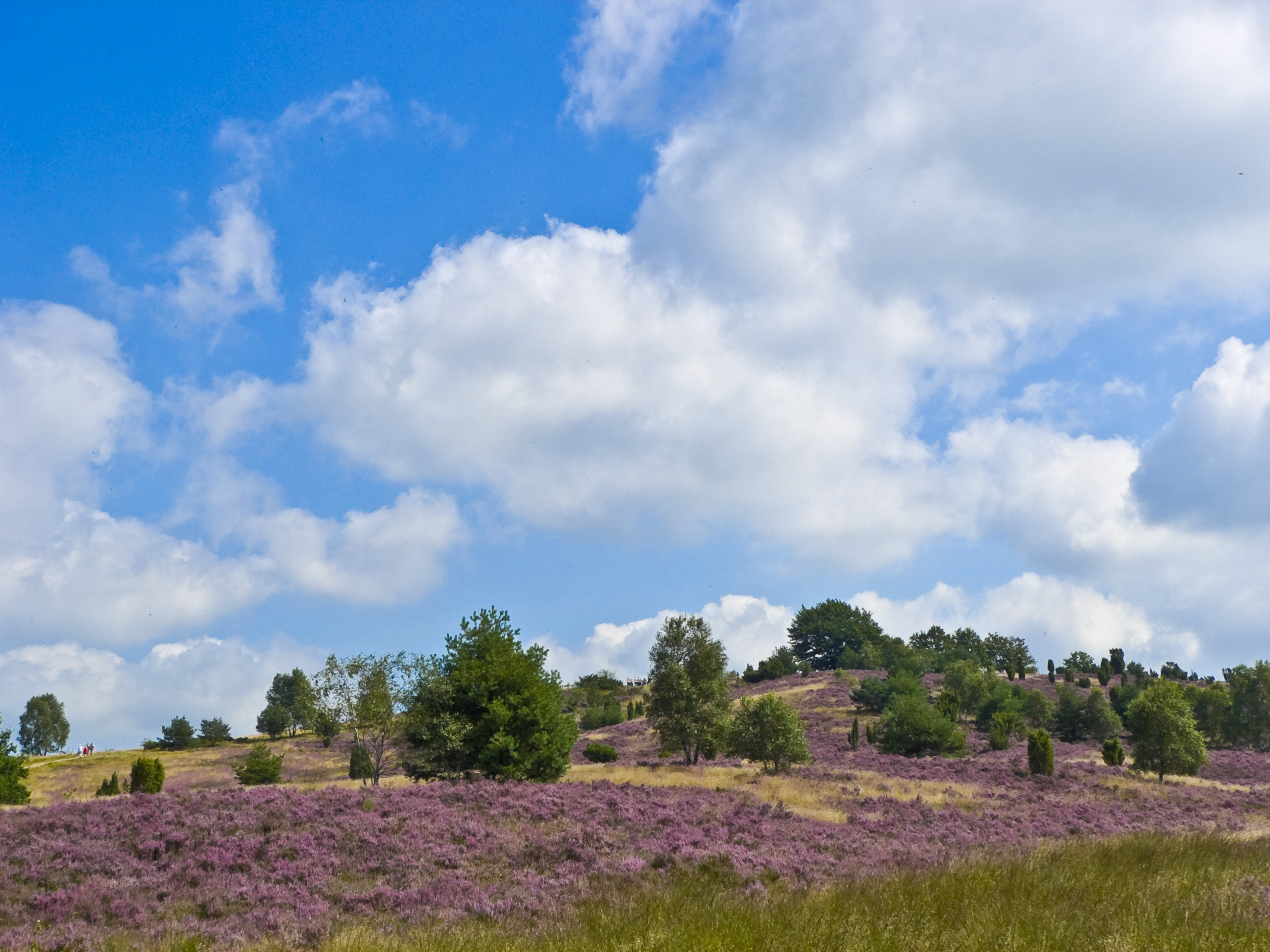

Highest point
- Elevation: 169.2 m above sea level (NN) (555 ft)
- Coordinates: 53°10′00″N 9°56′00″E

Geography
- Location within Lower Saxony
- Location: Lower Saxony, Germany

At 169 m above sea level (NN), the Wilseder Berg is the highest point on the Lüneburg Heath in North Germany. Due to its position in the middle of the nature reserve Lüneburg Heath it is a popular tourist destination, especially in the period when the heather is in flower.

== Description ==
The Wilseder Berg is part of a nature reserve within the Lüneburg Heath and lies near the villages of Wilsede and Bispingen in the Heidekreis. The hill was formed during the penultimate ice age, the Saale glaciation, and was part of a terminal moraine. It has a broad plateau and a flat summit. Around it lies a varied landscape of hollows, valleys and small ravines. The surrounding area has leached, gravelly-sandy soils with layers of hardpan, covered by open sand, large areas of heathland and extensive coniferous forest. The heathland is grazed by a variety of moorland sheep, known as the Heidschnucke.

The Wilseder Berg lies on a watershed, from which several headstreams emerge, such as those of the Este, Luhe, Wümme and Böhme. Some of these streams feed the river system of the Weser, others flow eventually into the Elbe.

There is a stone on the summit plateau on which there is a metal cone engraved with the directions and distance of neighbouring hills and towns, near and far.

=== Totengrund and Steingrund ===
The best-known valley in the vicinity of the hill is the Totengrund hollow, several hectares in area, south of the museum village of Wilsede. It is an old dead-ice kettle hole with sides up to 40 metres high, covered in heather and juniper bushes. The name means "dead ground" and was probably so called because of its very infertile, i.e. dead, soil, because the valley is very dry. The Totengrund became the heart of the present-day nature reserve when Egestorf priest, Wilhelm Bode, purchased it in 1906 with donations. There is a controversy involving current plans to build seven wind turbines of a height in excess of 180 metres (over 600 feet) near Behringen. These would be visible from the Totengrund and according to local environmentalists spoil the view.

Another nearby valley is the Steingrund, which is covered thickly with stones deposited during the ice age and is a typical heathland dry valley.

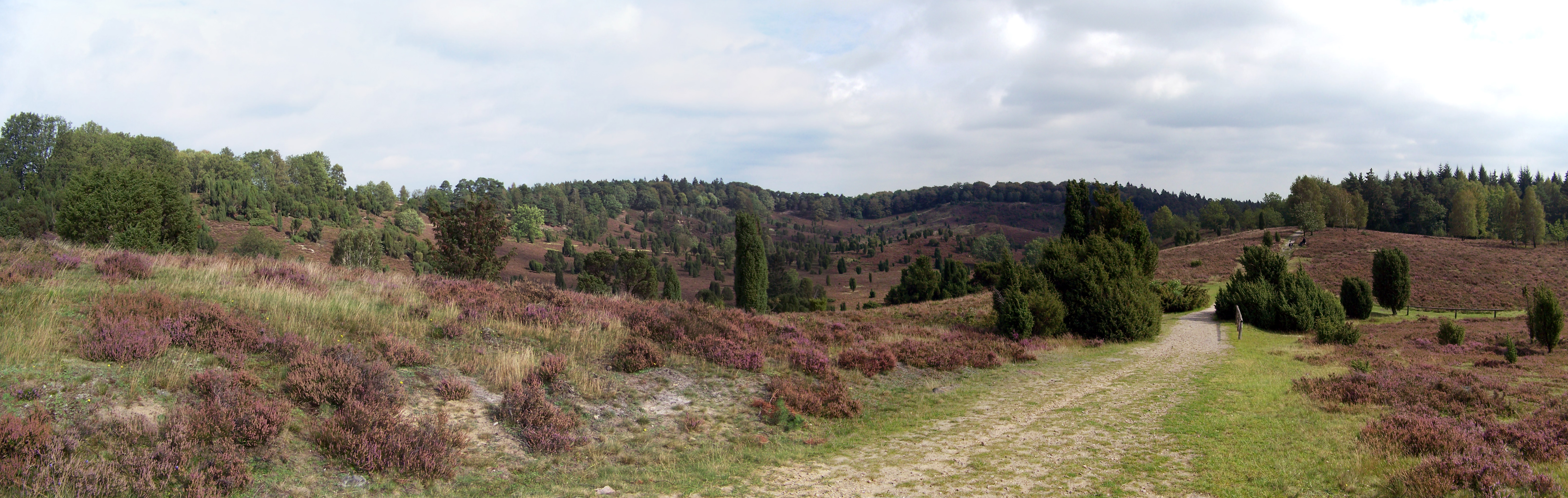
Totengrund valley in September 2011.

== Triangulation station ==
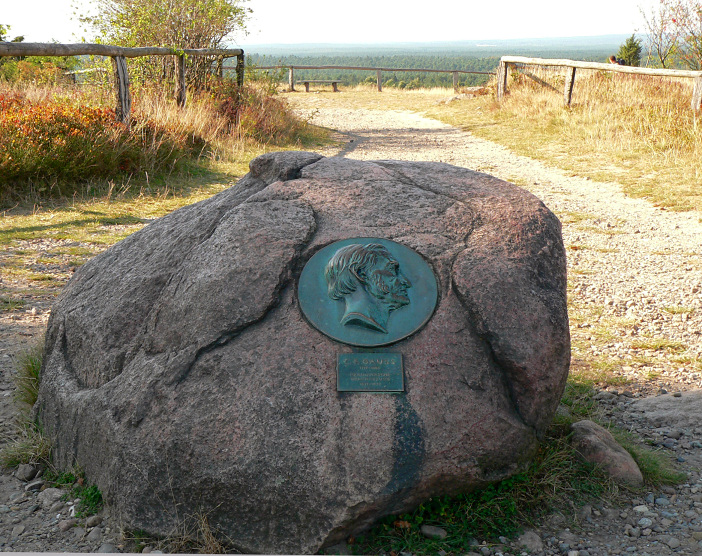
Stone commemorating the survey with a portrait of Carl Friedrich Gauss

In 1820 George IV of the United Kingdom, who was also the King of Hanover, tasked the Professor of Astronomy and Director of the Observatory at Göttingen University, Carl Friedrich Gauss, to survey the Kingdom of Hanover. Gauss used the summit of the Wilseder Berg, amongst others, as a triangulation station for his land surveys. Other central triangulation points were the Falkenberg (150 m above NN) to the south and the Haußelberg (118 m above NN) to the east.

Part of the triangulation network, depicting the Wilseder Berg, was represented on the reverse side of the 4th series of 10 Deutschmark banknotes.

== Tourism ==
The picturesque landscape is popular with tourists. There are horse-drawn carriages for hire to the Wilseder Berg from the villages of Oberhaverbeck, Niederhaverbeck, Undeloh, Döhle or Sudermühlen and it can also be reached on foot from Volkwardingen.

On a clear day the TV tower at Hamburg can be seen on the horizon. There are also scenic views over the heath towards the west and north.

== Gallery ==
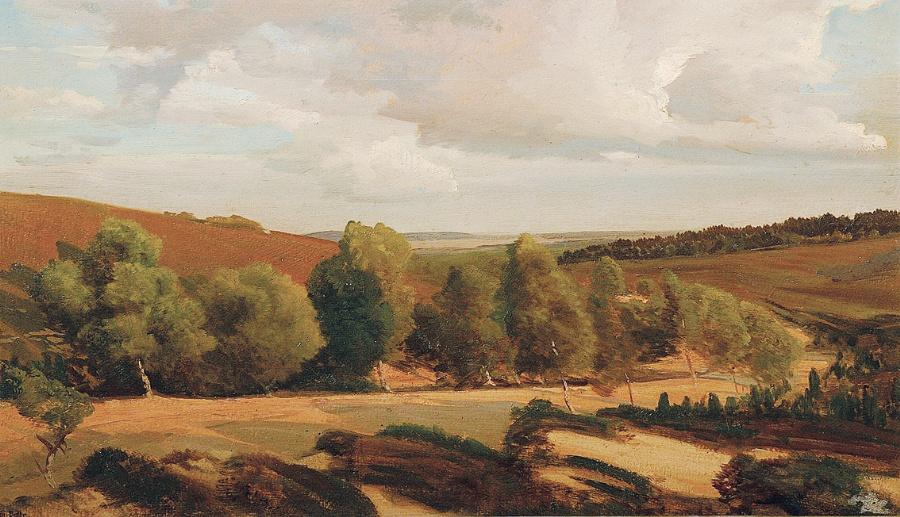
Valentin Ruths (1825–1905): Wilseder Berg

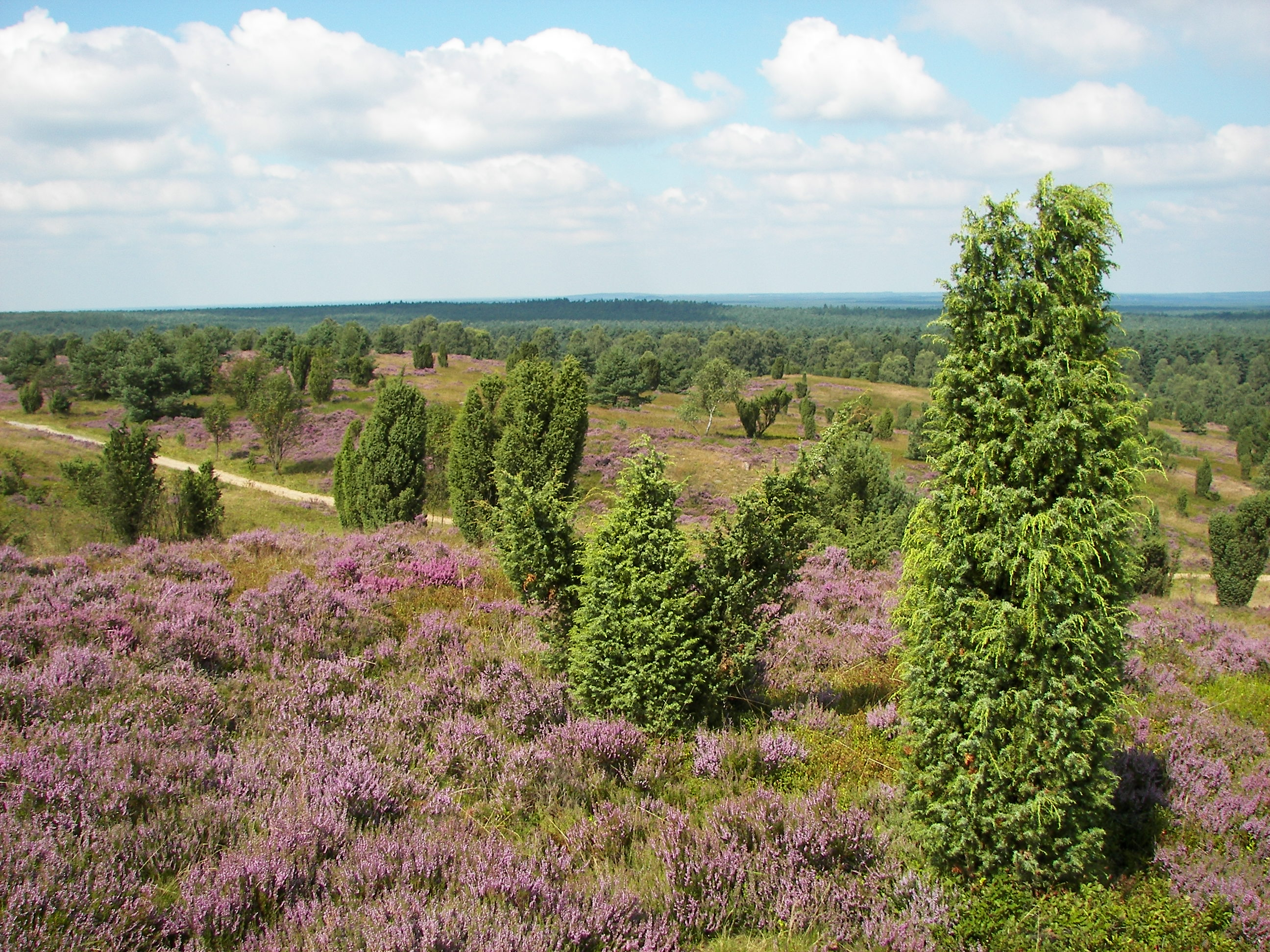
View to the north from Wilseder Berg

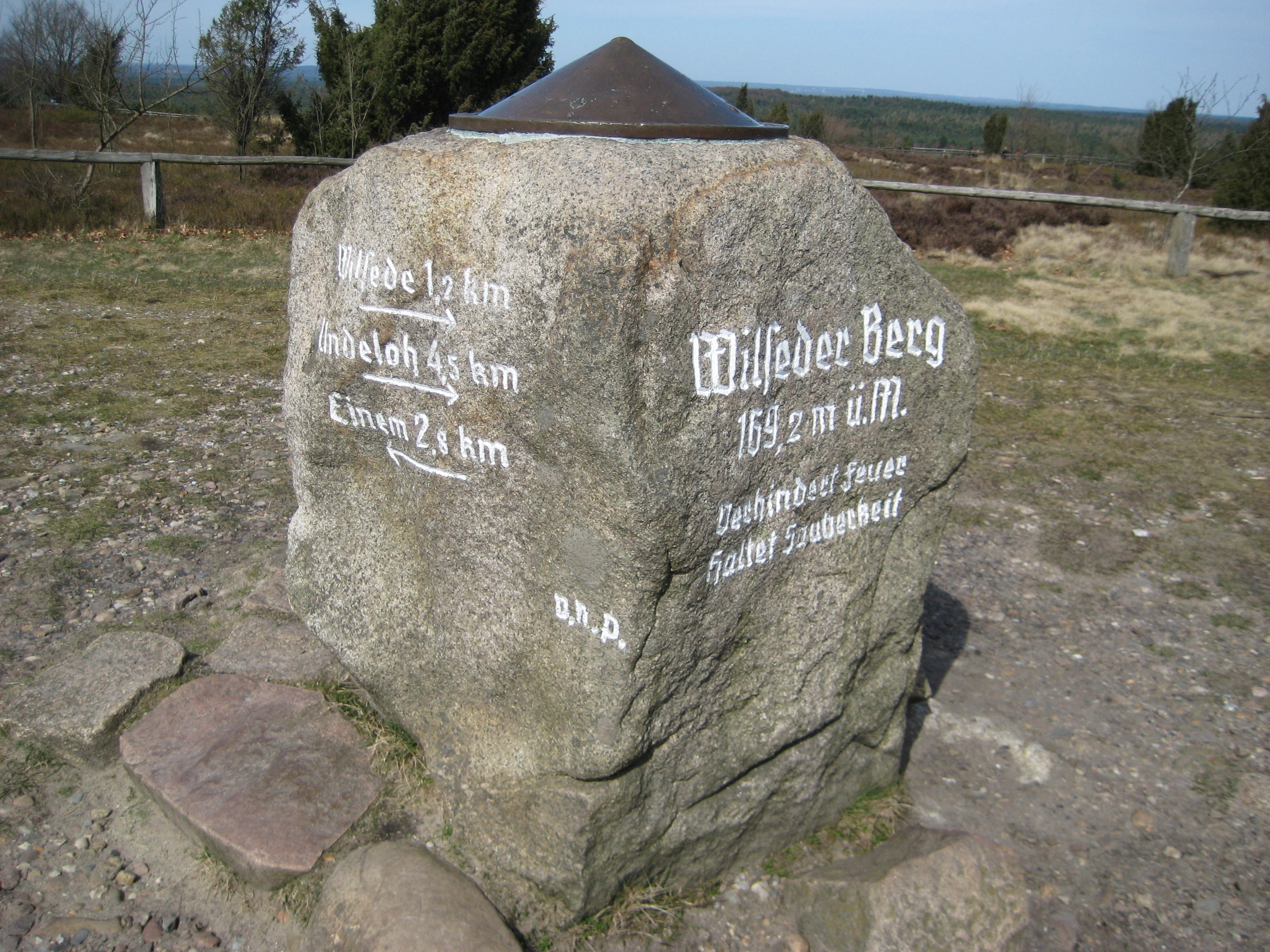
Stone on the summit

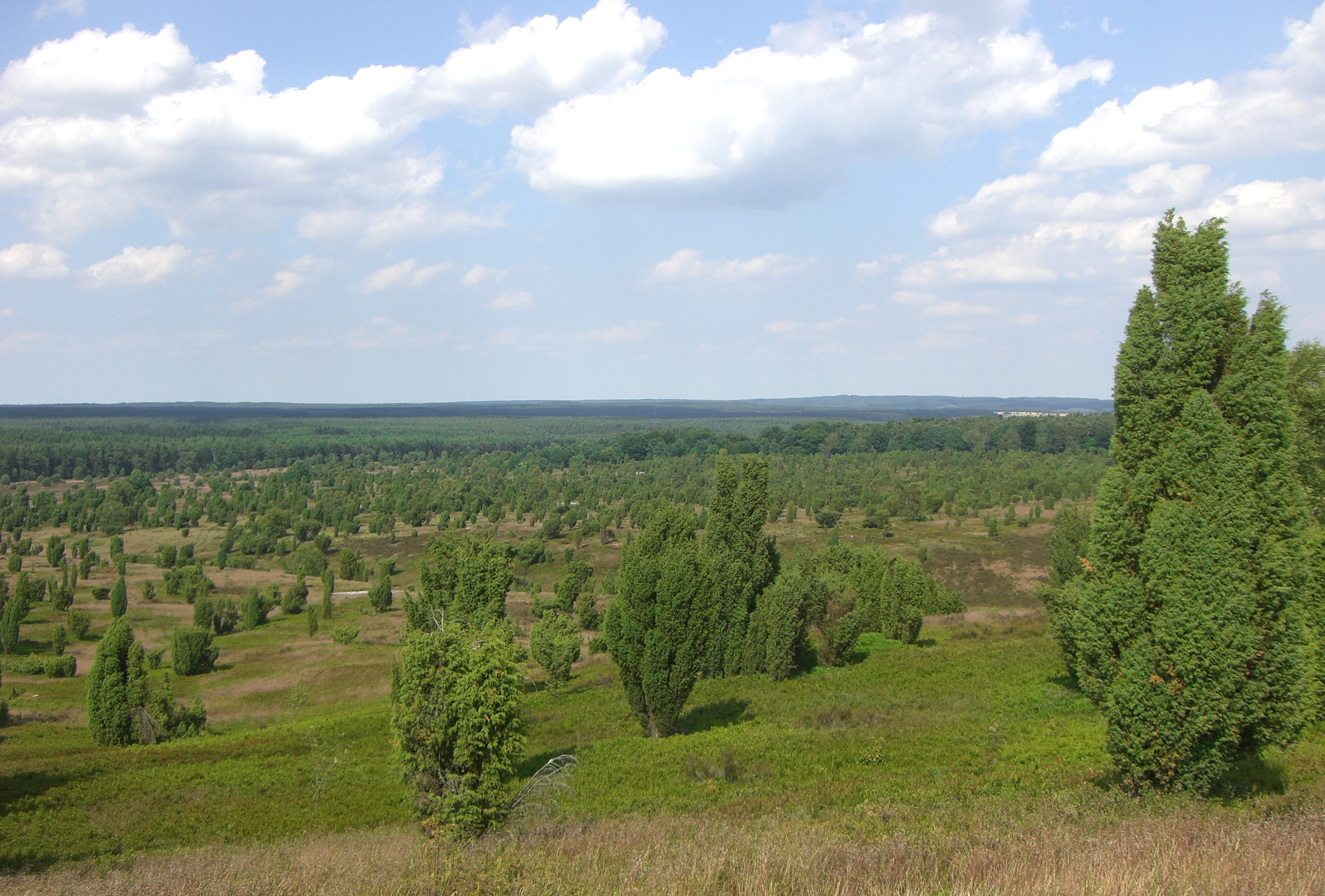
Blueberry-covered sandy heath on the northern slope

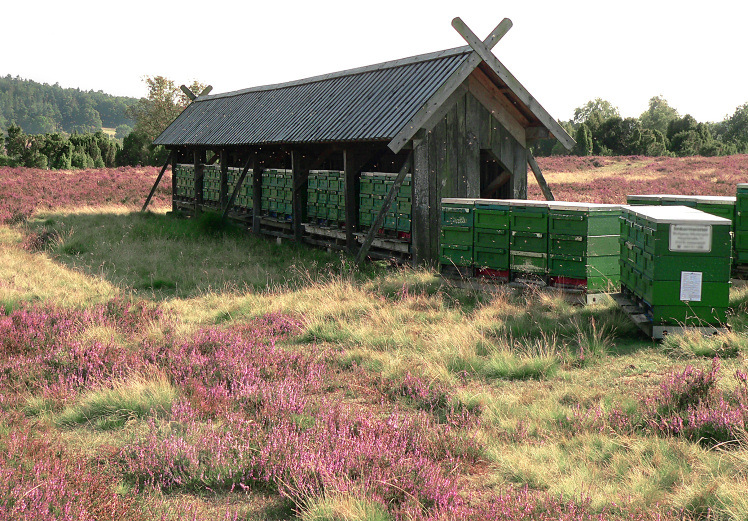
Heath beekeeping near the Wilseder Berg
