= Hasselbrack =

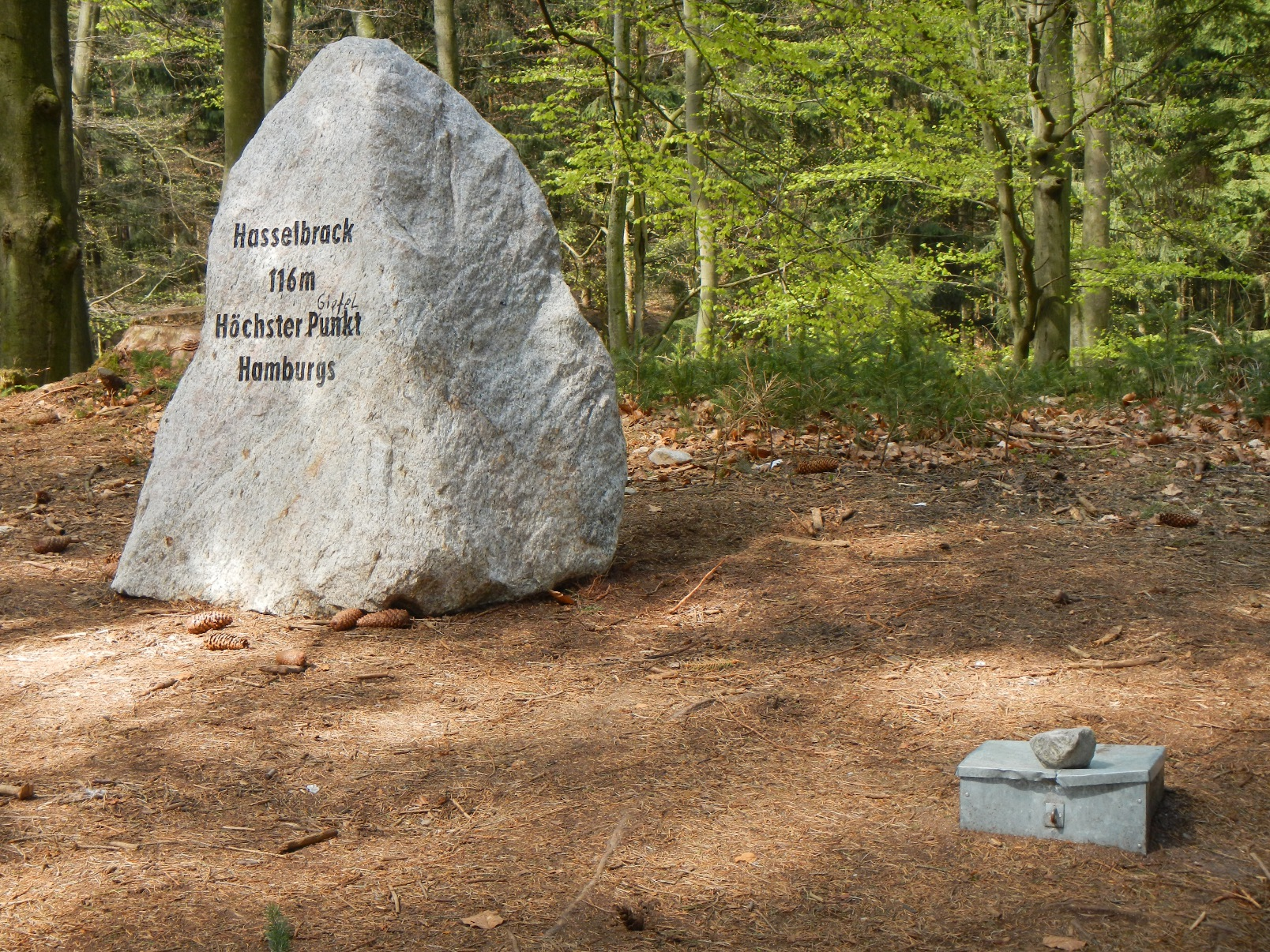
- Summit obelisk on the Hasselbrack.

Highest point
- Elevation: 116 m above sea level (NN) (381 ft)
- Listing: Highest elevation in Hamburg
- Coordinates: 53°25′54″N 9°51′54″E

Geography
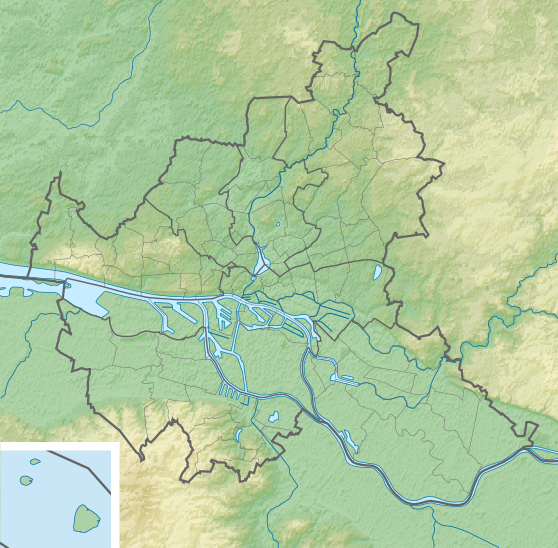
- Location within Hamburg Location within Germany
- Location: Hamburg
- Parent range: Harburg Hills

The Hasselbrack, at 116.2 m above sea level (NN), is the highest point in the state of Hamburg, Germany.

It is located on the southern border of the city state with Lower Saxony in the "Black Hills" (Schwarze Berge), a northern outlier of the Harburg Hills in the quarter of Neugraben-Fischbek. It lies within the Rosengarten State Forest close to the Daerstorf Heath (Daerstorfer Heide) between the settlement of Waldfrieden in the north (which belongs to Fischbek), Neu Wulmstorf-Tempelberg in the west and Rosengarten-Alvesen in the east. On the "summit" of the Hasselbrack there is a trigonometric point, that is located in the wood just a few metres from the footpath and which marks the highest point. On 16 July 2011 a wooden summit cross was erected here, replaced in 2013 by a summit obelisk .
