= Baursberg =

Coordinates: 53°33′58″N 9°47′14″E

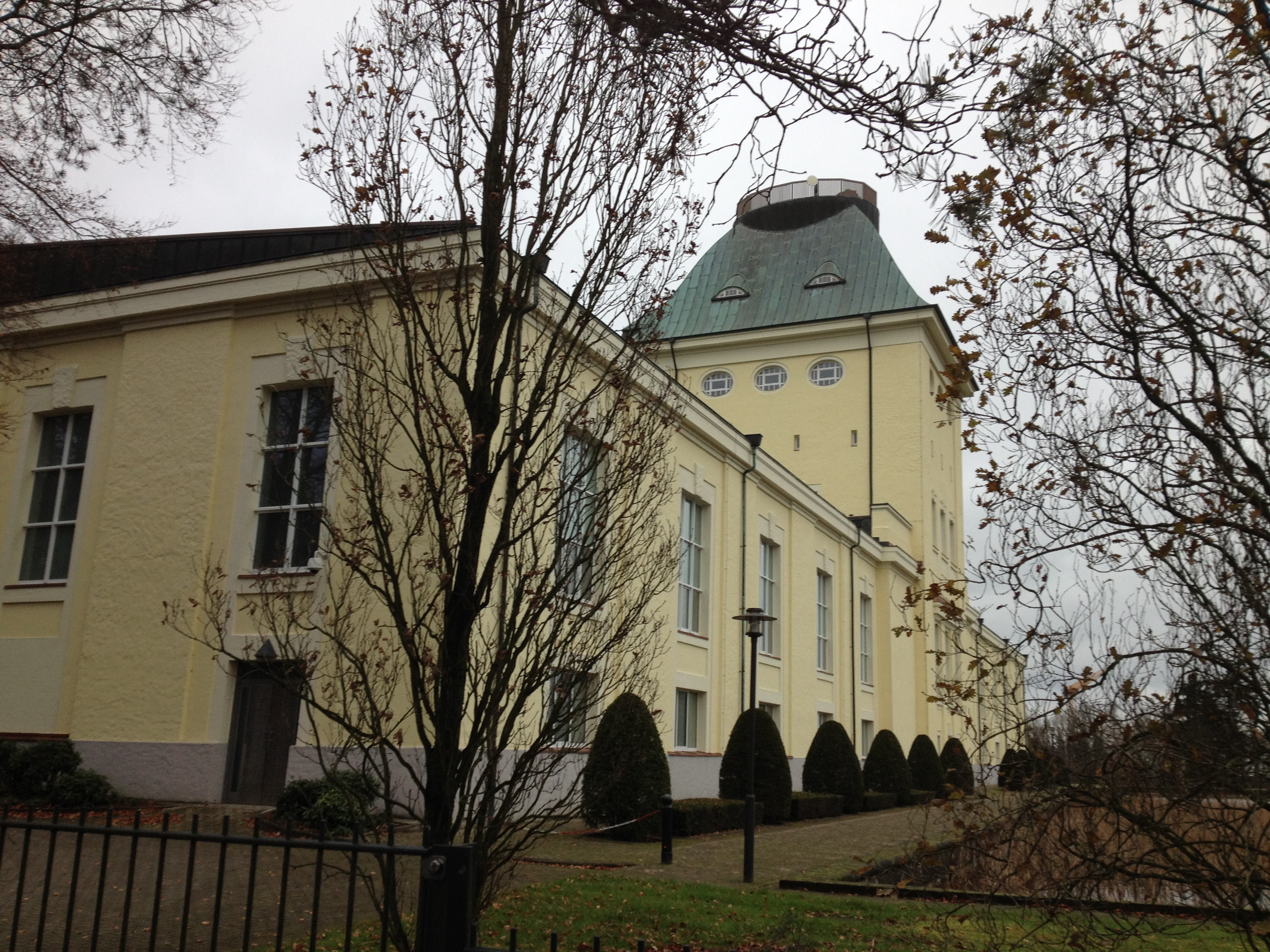
The waterworks on the Baursberg.

The Baursberg has a height of 91.6 m above sea level (NN) and is therefore the largest hill in the quarter of Blankenese, Hamburg, Germany and the second largest of the city (behind Hasselbrack). It is part of the high shore of Blankenese. On top of it the Waterworks Baursberg is located. It was built in 1859, being the first with filtration in Hamburg. Until 1960 also water of the river Elbe was used, after that only ground water, because of the growing pollution of the river. Eleven wells pump water from depths of 40 to 320m. The height of the hill is then used to transport the water to the consumer without pumps, even to distant quarters such as Othmarschen and the town of Schenefeld in Schleswig-Holstein. The waterworks is operated by state owned Hamburg Wasser.
