= Blankenese =

- Quarter of Hamburg
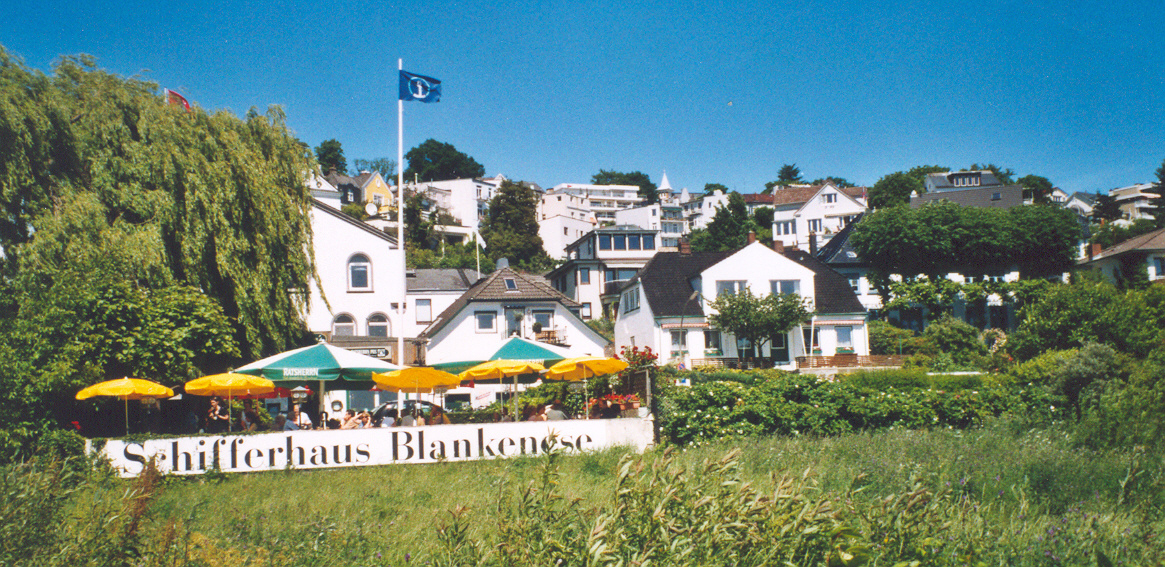
- Beach of Blankenese

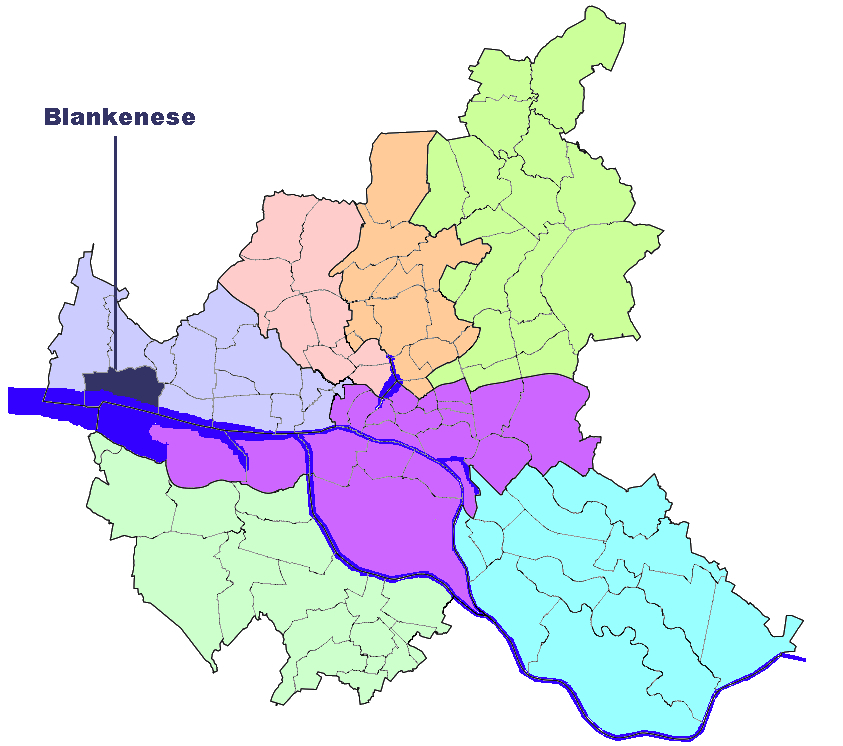
- Location of Blankenese in Hamburg
- Interactive map of Blankenese
- Location within Germany Location within Hamburg
- Coordinates: 53°33′37″N 9°48′29″E
- Country: Germany
- State: Hamburg
- City: Hamburg
- Borough: Altona, Hamburg

Area
  - Total: 7.7 km^{2} (3.0 sq mi)

Population (2024-12-31)
  - Total: 13,487
  - Density: 1,800/km^{2} (4,500/sq mi)
- Time zone: UTC+01:00 (CET)
  - Summer (DST): UTC+02:00 (CEST)
- Postal codes: 22587
- Dialling codes: 040
- Vehicle registration: HH

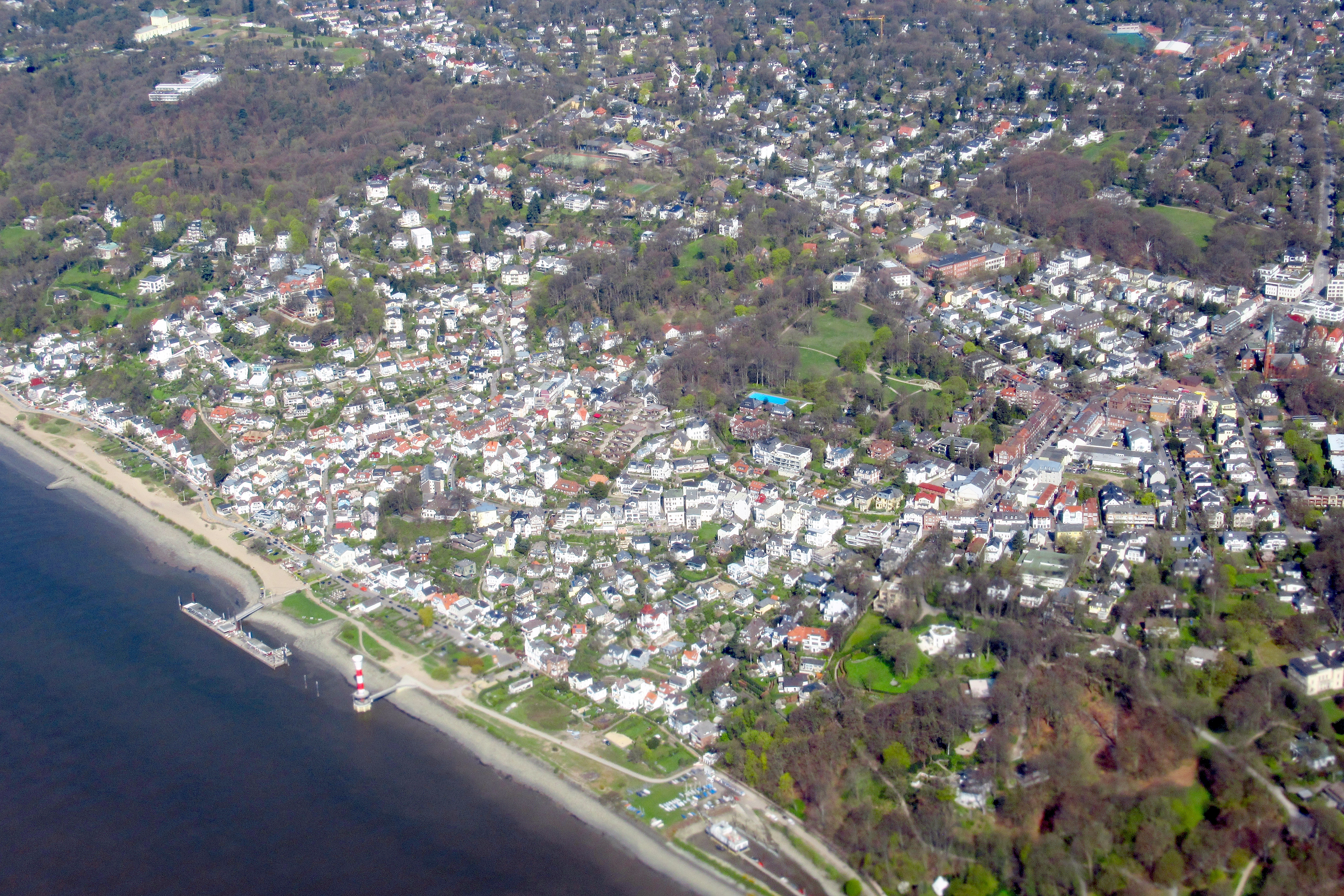
Blankenese, aerial view

Blankenese (German: [ˌblaŋkənˈezə]) is a suburban quarter in the borough of Altona in the western part of Hamburg, Germany; until 1938 it was an independent municipality in Holstein. It is located on the right bank of the Elbe river. With a population of 13,637 as of 2020, today it is widely known as one of Hamburg's most affluent neighborhoods.

== History ==
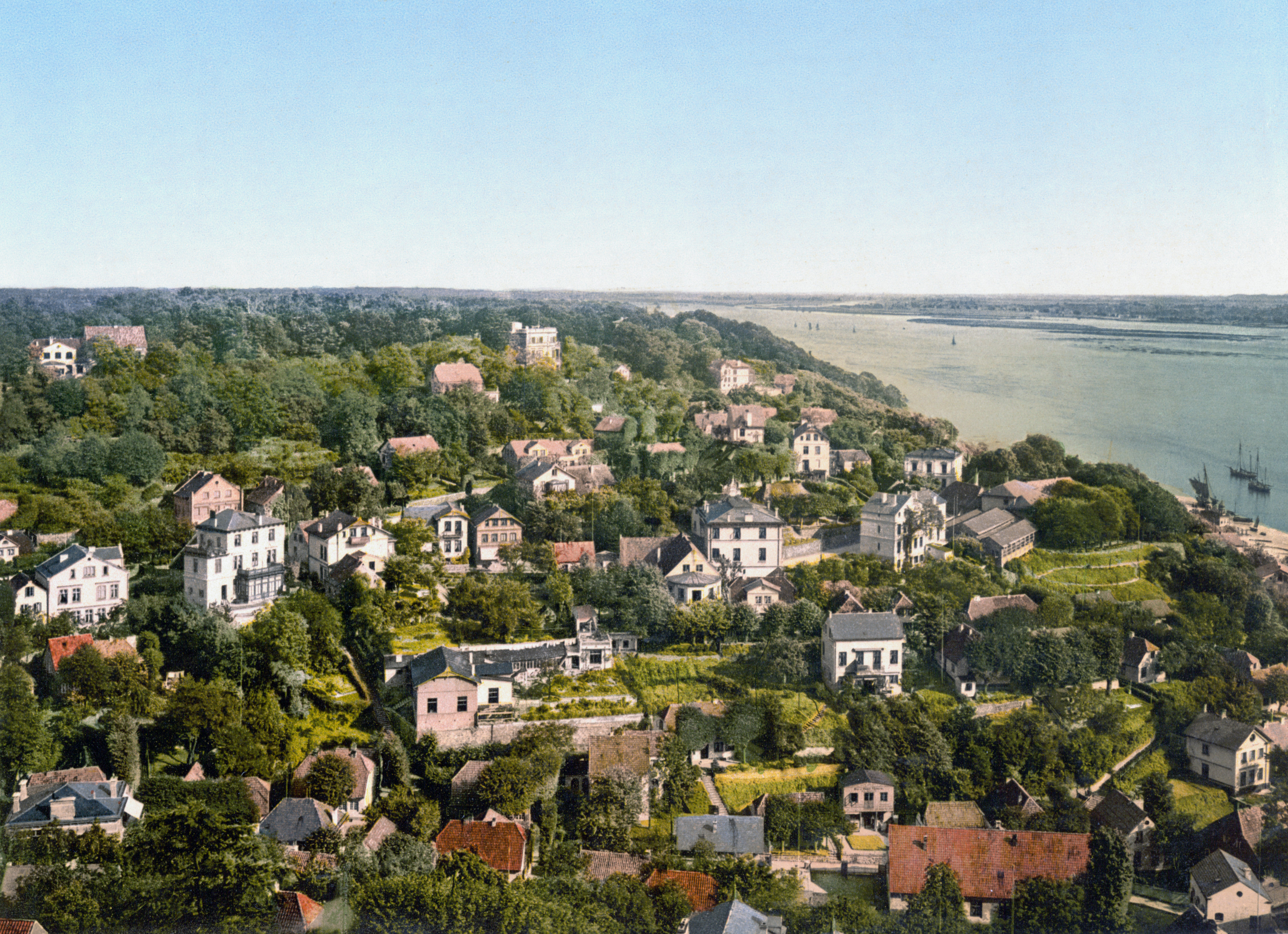
Old Postcard

Blankenese has a long history as a fishing village along the Elbe River.

In 1060, Archbishop Adalbert of Bremen built a provost's residence at the site of an older settlement at the hill Süllberg. Later the counts of Holstein built a castle. Both were destroyed through Hamburg.

Until 1927, Blankenese was an independent town in Holstein and then it was merged into the town Altona by law. In 1938 Altona was merged into Hamburg with the Greater Hamburg Act.

During World War II, the suburb held a Luftwaffe Officer Cadet camp, which became HQ 85 Group Signals for the Royal Air Force in 1945.

After the war, an orphanage operated in Blankenese, for children who were Holocaust survivors.

=== Origin of the name ===
Blankenese comes from the Low German blank ness, meaning 'white promontory' in the Elbe river.

== Geography ==
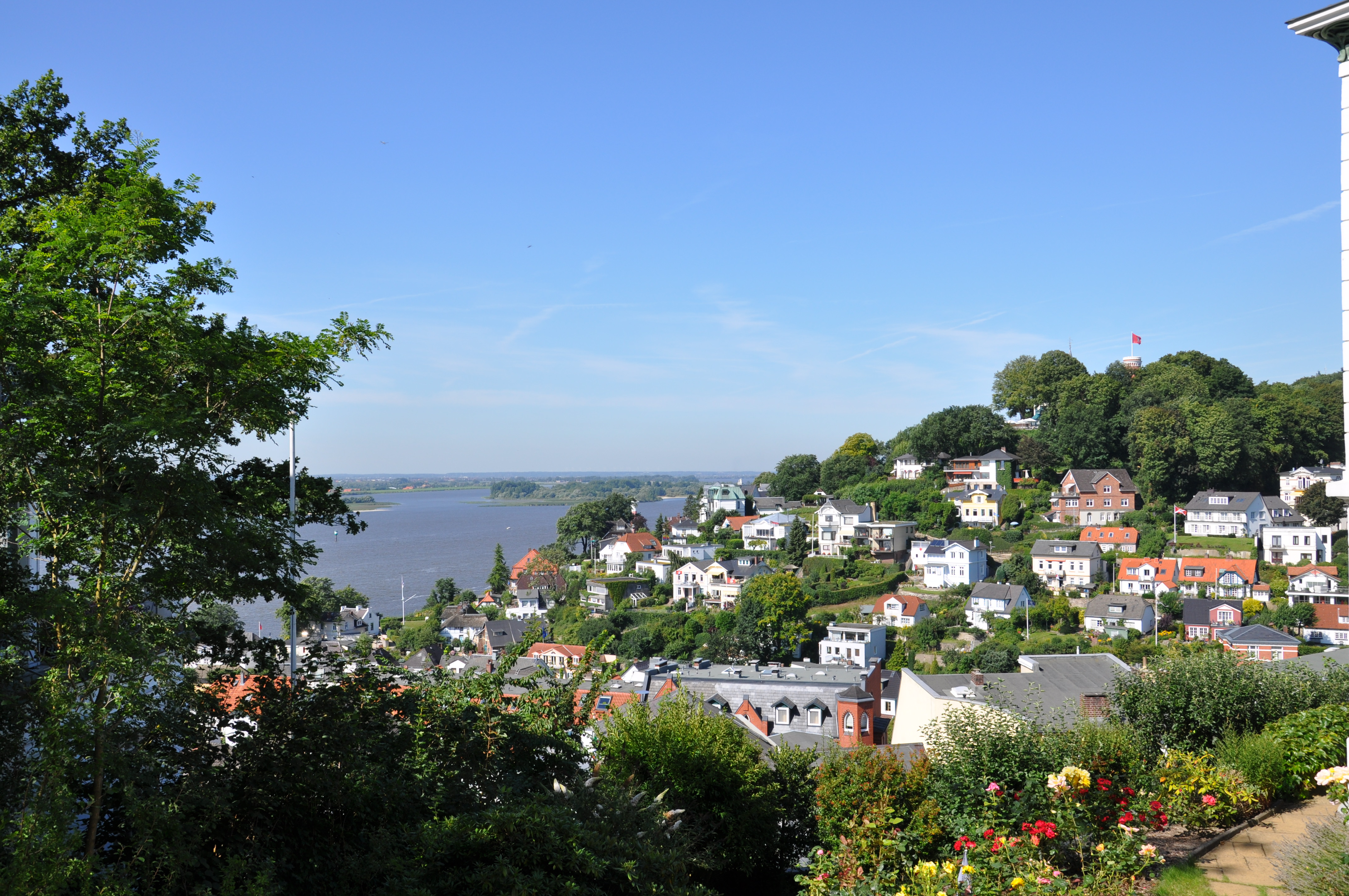
Blankenese: view from a hill

According to the 2006 records of Hamburg and Schleswig-Holsteins' statistical office, Blankenese comprises a total area of 8.3 square kilometres (3.2 square miles).

Blankenese is located south of Sülldorf, east of Rissen and west of Nienstedten. To the south is the widest point of the river Elbe (2.8 km) which provides various tourist and recreational opportunities as well as a view of the Airbus plant.

The views from the river-facing portions of Blankenese have resulted in highly desirable properties and expensive real estate prices. The steep hillside residences boast many tiny, pedestrian-only streets and 4,864 stairs. The Strandweg is home to the Strand Hotel, built in 1902, as well as several other cafes and restaurants. There are two lighthouses, a Roman garden, a doll museum and several parks and walking trails in Blankenese.

=== Parks ===
- Baur's Park
- Bismarckstein Park
- Gossler's Park
- Hessepark
- Hirschpark (Deer Park)
- Sven-Simon-Park

== Politics ==
Anna-Elisabeth von Treuenfels-Frowein represents Blankenese in the Hamburg Parliament.

These are the results of Blankenese in the Hamburg state election:

Election	SPD	Greens	CDU	FDP	Left	AfD	Others
2020	35,3 %	25,1 %	16,7 %	11,2 %	4,2 %	4,0 %	3,5 %
2015	35,9 %	12,4 %	20,4 %	19,6 %	3,6 %	5,5 %	2,6 %
2011	36,4 %	10,5 %	29,0 %	18,2 %	2,6 %	–	3,3 %
2008	20,8 %	9,3 %	57,4 %	9,1 %	2,4 %	–	0,9 %
2004	16,7 %	11,7 %	63,7 %	5,2 %	–	–	2,7 %
2001	22,4 %	8,7 %	36,9 %	15,1 %	0,1 %	–	16,8 %
1997	21,2 %	12,5 %	45,8 %	9,0 %	0,3 %	–	11,2 %
1993	23,1 %	15,3 %	38,3 %	9,0 %	–	–	14,3 %
1991	26,5 %	7,9 %	51,4 %	12,3 %	0,3 %	–	1,6 %
1987	26,6 %	6,5 %	52,9 %	13,5 %	–	–	0,5 %
1986	22,7 %	9,8 %	55,2 %	11,7 %	–	–	0,6 %
Dec 1982	27,6 %	6,9 %	58,0 %	7,2 %	–	–	0,3 %
Jun 1982	22,1 %	8,4 %	62,0 %	6,5 %	–	–	1,0 %
1978	26,9 %	4,8 %	57,9 %	7,7 %	–	–	2,7 %
1974	22,0 %	–	59,9 %	15,0 %	–	–	3,1 %
1970	32,4 %	–	49,5 %	13,2 %	–	–	4,9 %
1966	34,9 %	–	47,8 %	11,6 %	–	–	5,7 %

== Demographics ==
Facts of area Inhabitants: 13,686 Of which under 18: 2532 About 65: 3758 Median income: 117,139 € / (2013) Area: 7.7 km^{2} Number of day nurseries: 8 Number of schools: 1 primary school, 3 high schools, 1 district school Residential building: 3424 Apartments: 6898 Established doctors: 111 Crime in 2018: recorded: 868, enlightened: 286 The population density was 1,577/km^{2} (4,084/sq mi). Of the total population 10.2% were immigrants. 189 people were registered as unemployed. In 1999 there were 6,990 households, out of which 16.7% had children under the age of 18 living with them and 47.1% of all households were made up of individuals. The average household size was 1.97.

== Education ==
Number of schools: 1 primary school, 3 high schools, 1 district school. There are 4 elementary schools and 4 secondary schools: Marion Dönhoff Gymnasium, Gymnasium Blankenese, Bugenhagenschule am Hessepark and Gesamtschule Blankenese.

== Sports ==
Since 1997 the cycling world elite annually drives through Blankenese on the course of the EuroEyes Cyclassics (until 2005 HEW Cyclassics, until 2015 Vattenfall Cyclassics), the only German World Tour race. The streets of Blankenese are usually included in the course several times, as the drivers have to go across the notorious hill of Waseberg, which is also located in the quarter, three times. It is the main difficulty within the race.

The football clubs of SV Blankenese (founded in 1903) and FTSV Komet Blankenese (founded 1907) have a long tradition in the quarter.

== Infrastructure ==
A local office of the main district office Altona called Customer Centre Blankenese is located at Erik Blumenfeld Platz. The local quarter court Amtsgericht Hamburg-Blankenese is located at Dormienstrasse.

The Honorary Consulate of the Kingdom of Morocco (Al Mamlakah al Maghribiyah) established in Hamburg in 1960 is located on the street In de Bargen.

=== Commerce ===
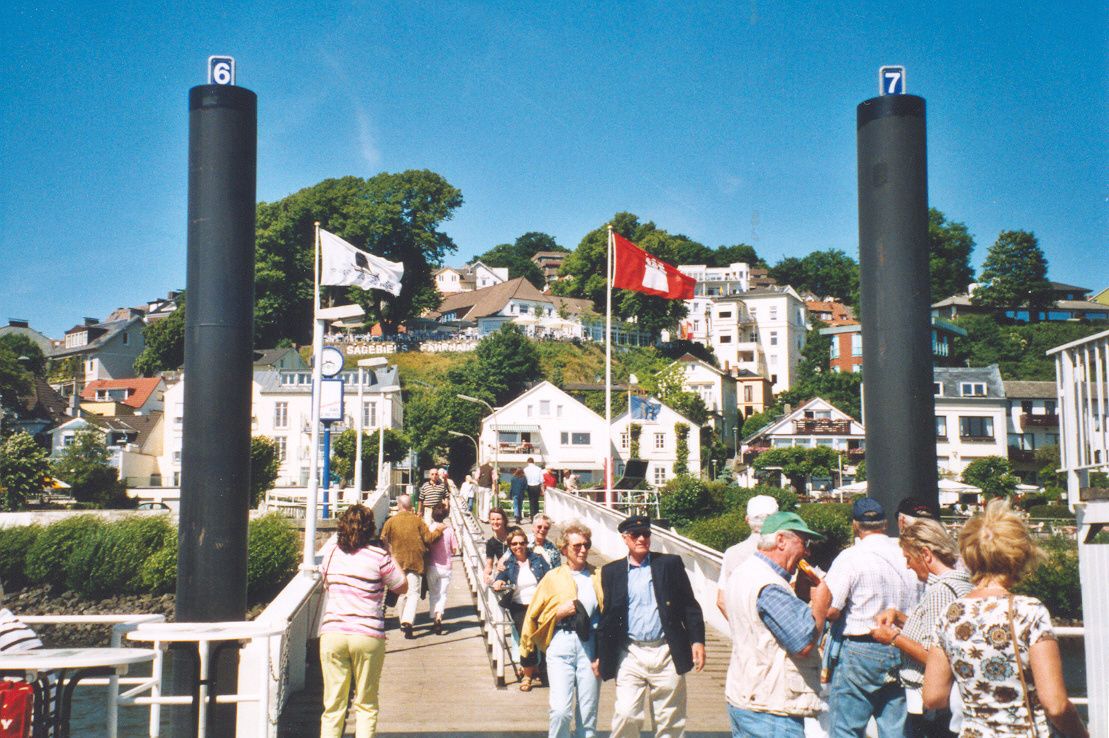
Blankenese's dock

Blankeneser Landstrasse and Blankenese Bahnhofstrasse form the main intersection of commercial activities in Bankenese. While the shops, banks and post office are open normal business hours from Monday through Saturday, the popular public farmer's market is only available on Tuesday, Friday & Saturday.

=== Health systems ===
The hospital Tabea GmbH, located at Kösterbergstrasse, has 32 beds and specializes on hip and knee surgery and varicose vein surgery.

There are 73 physicians in private practice and 5 pharmacies.

=== Transportation ===
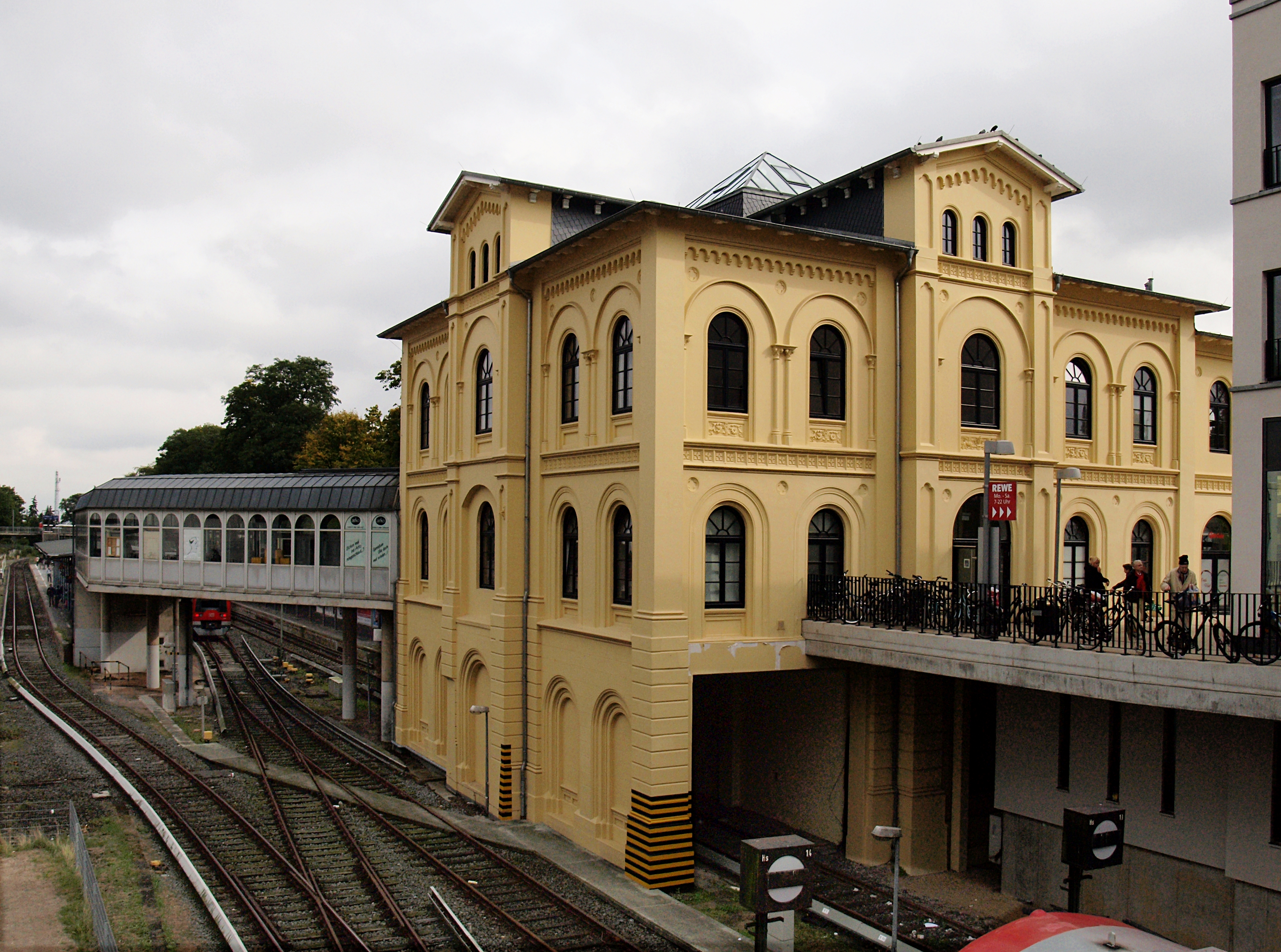
Blankenese station

Blankenese is serviced by the rapid transit system of the S-Bahn (with the Blankenese station) and by several buses of the public transport organisation. According to the Department of Motor Vehicles (Kraftfahrt-Bundesamt), there were 6,333 private cars registered (486 cars/1000 people) in 2006.

In summer 2008, the main train station in Blankenese has been completely rebuilt.

Blankenese's waterfront is serviced several times a day by a ferry connecting it with Cranz on the southern shore of the river. There are many buoys in the river to help guide all sizes of watercraft, since this part of the river has many shoals and is tidal.

=== Lighthouses ===
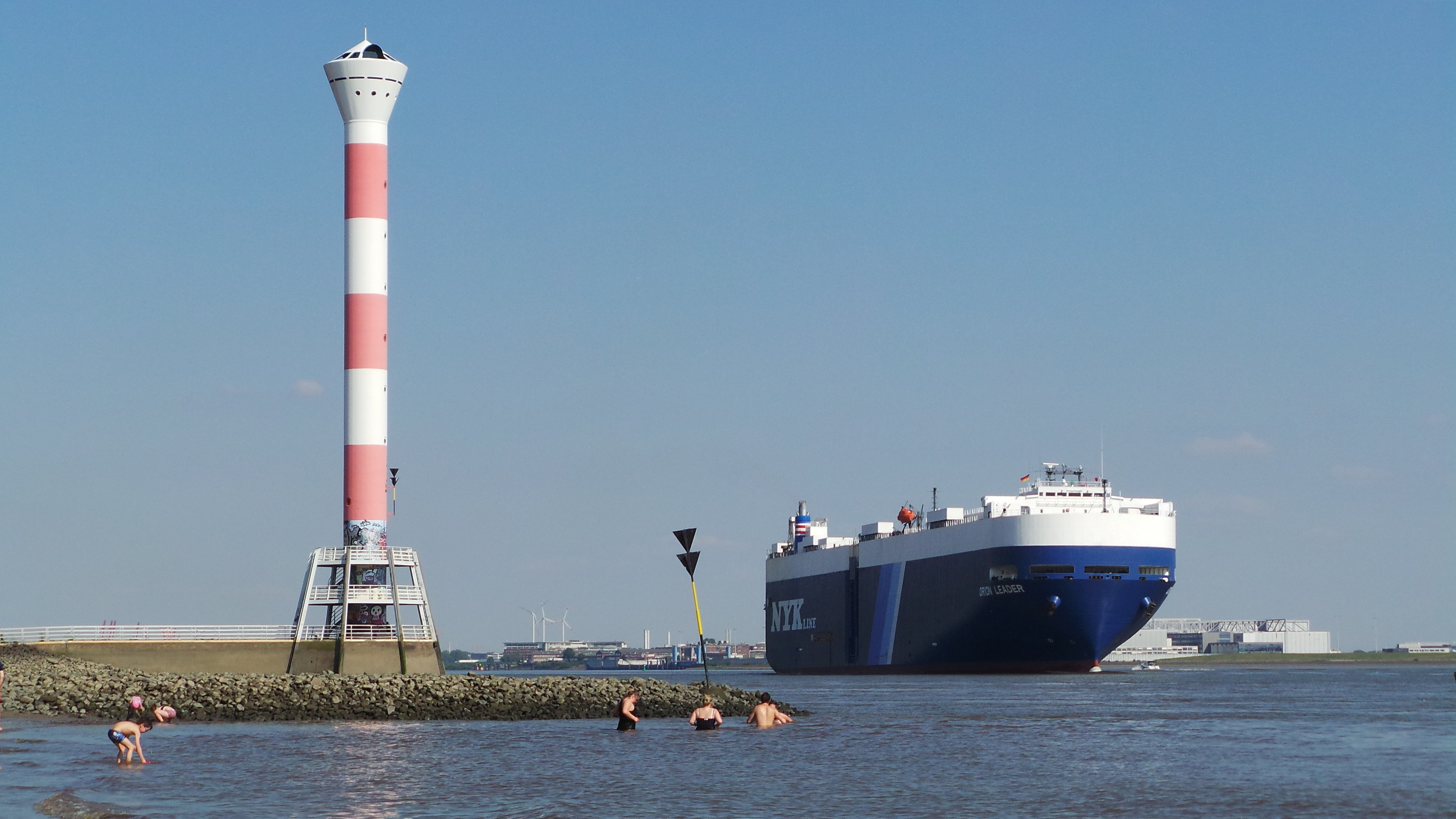
Blankenese Low Lighthouse

As of July 2020 there are four lighthouses, the old and new Blankenese Low Lighthouse, with a height of 42 m and 3 Platform decks for visitors at Strandweg and with a height of 32 m with similar Platform near Ferry Restaurants, and 40 m high Blankenese High Lighthouse at Bauerspark and a 62.25 m high one at a boat marina. Both pairs form a line together to Elbe River for incoming ships. The two new lighthouses were erected in summer 2020 because of an extension of the river bed. The two old lighthouses were demolished in autumn 2020 and replaced by others.

=== Waterworks ===
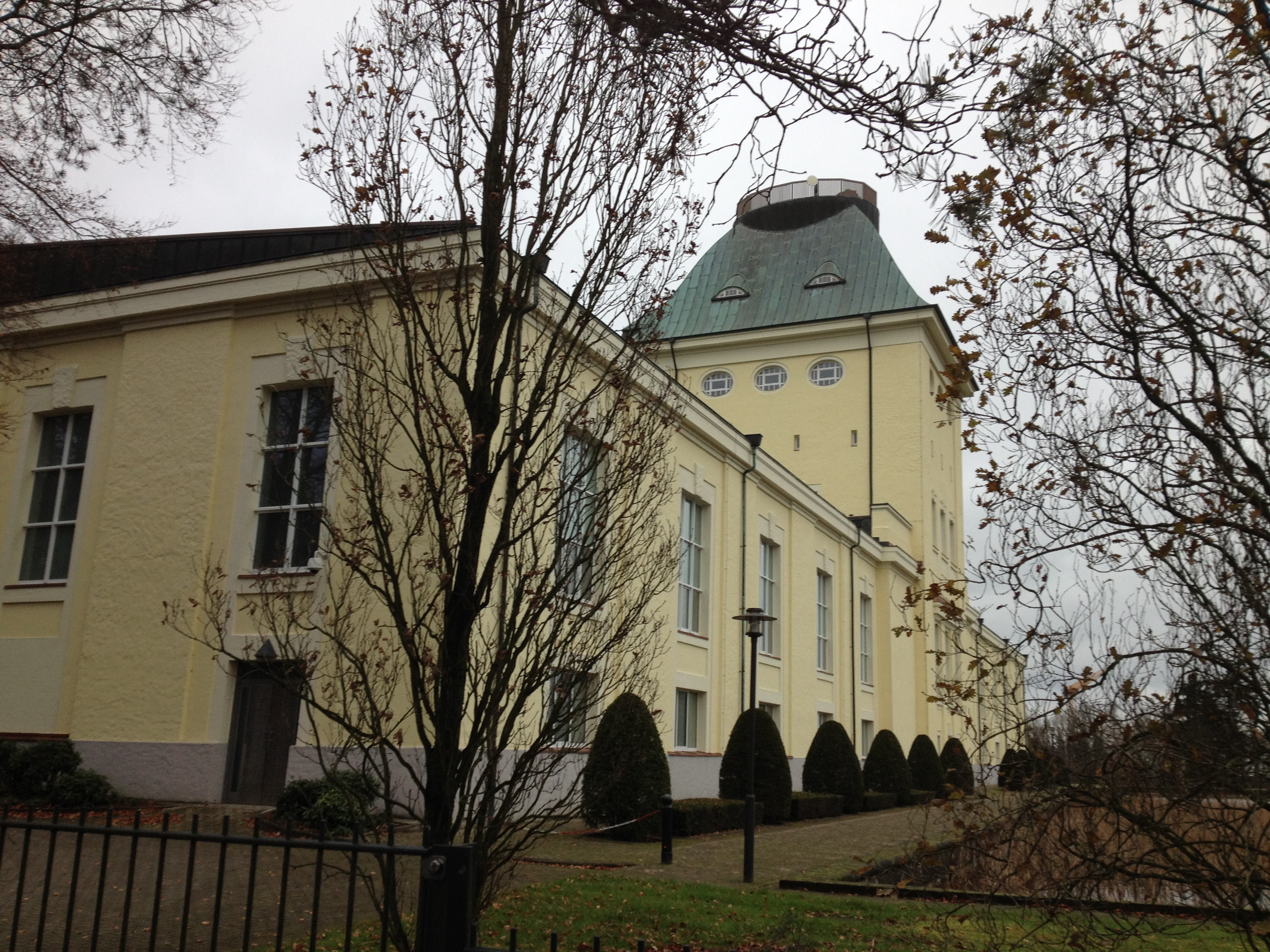
The waterworks on the Baursberg.

On the hill of Baursberg the waterworks of the same name is located since 1859, supplying the western suburbs of Hamburg and also the nearby town of Schenefeld.

== Wrecks ==
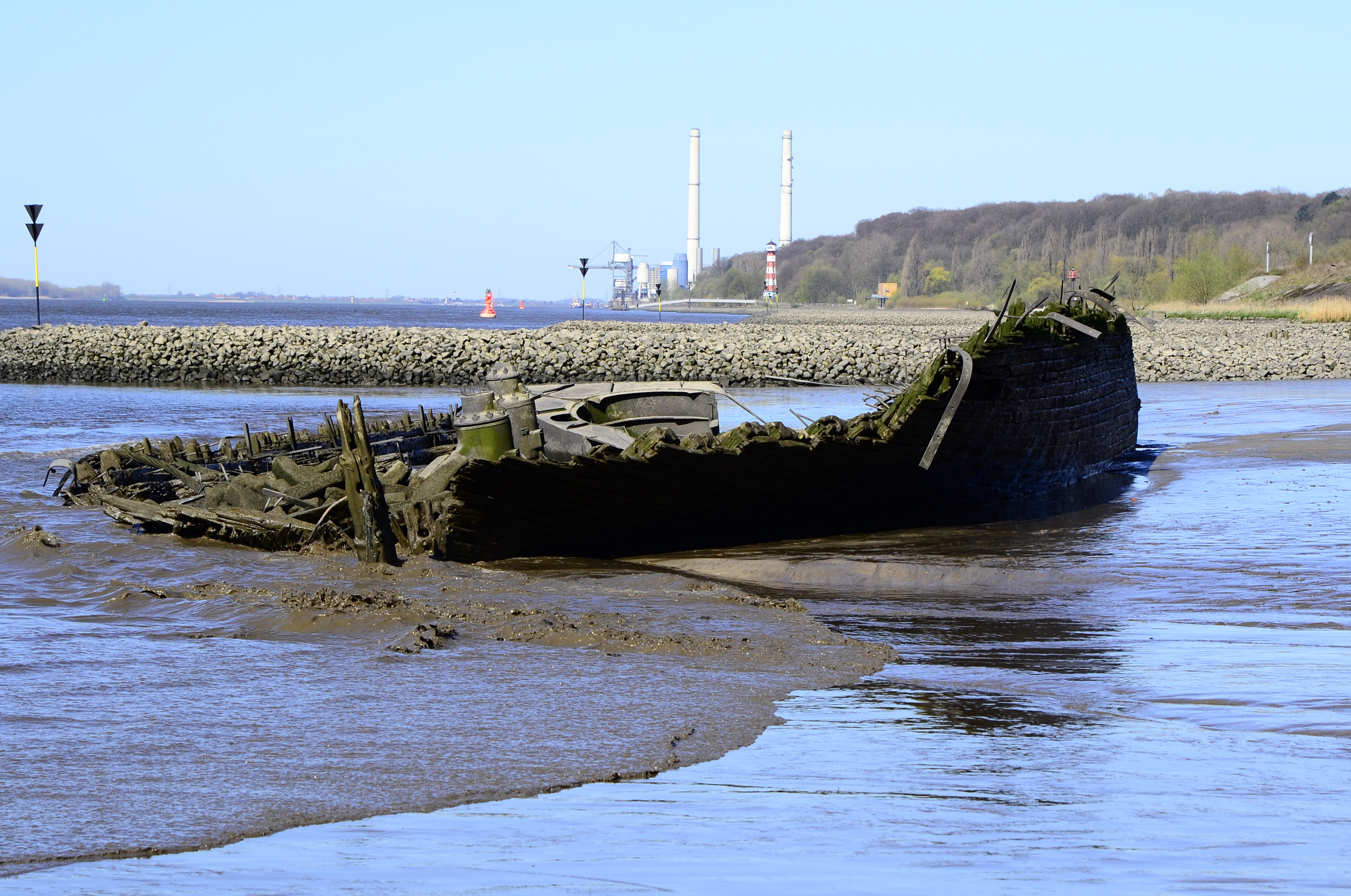
Polstjernan

The hulls of the following two sunken vessels are located outside the main international shipping strait. They had been earmarked for removal as they may pose a hazard to recreational marine traffic. However they afford scenic views and are popular with the locals, hence were allowed to remain there:

=== Polstjernan ===
The remains of the four-masted Finnish powered schooner Polstjernan (Polar Star), which caught fire on 20.10.1926 in today's Kiel Canal and was towed away by the Blankenese-based salvage company Harmstorf. Location: By the bank called Falkensteiner Ufer, house no. 26. UTM coordinates: 5934830.59 N, 552083.28 E The wreck can be reached at low tide without getting your feet wet. Its cargo of wood caught fire when an engine exploded while passing Kaiser Wilhelm Canal (today's Kiel Canal). She was then, a few days later, towed to Blankenese, where she was temporarily moored. Her insurers disputed responsibility for the wreck and it remained lying there ever since. As the wreck tended to float in flood conditions it was weighted down with scrap metal from submarine parts after World War II and has since been used as a breakwater.

=== Uwe ===
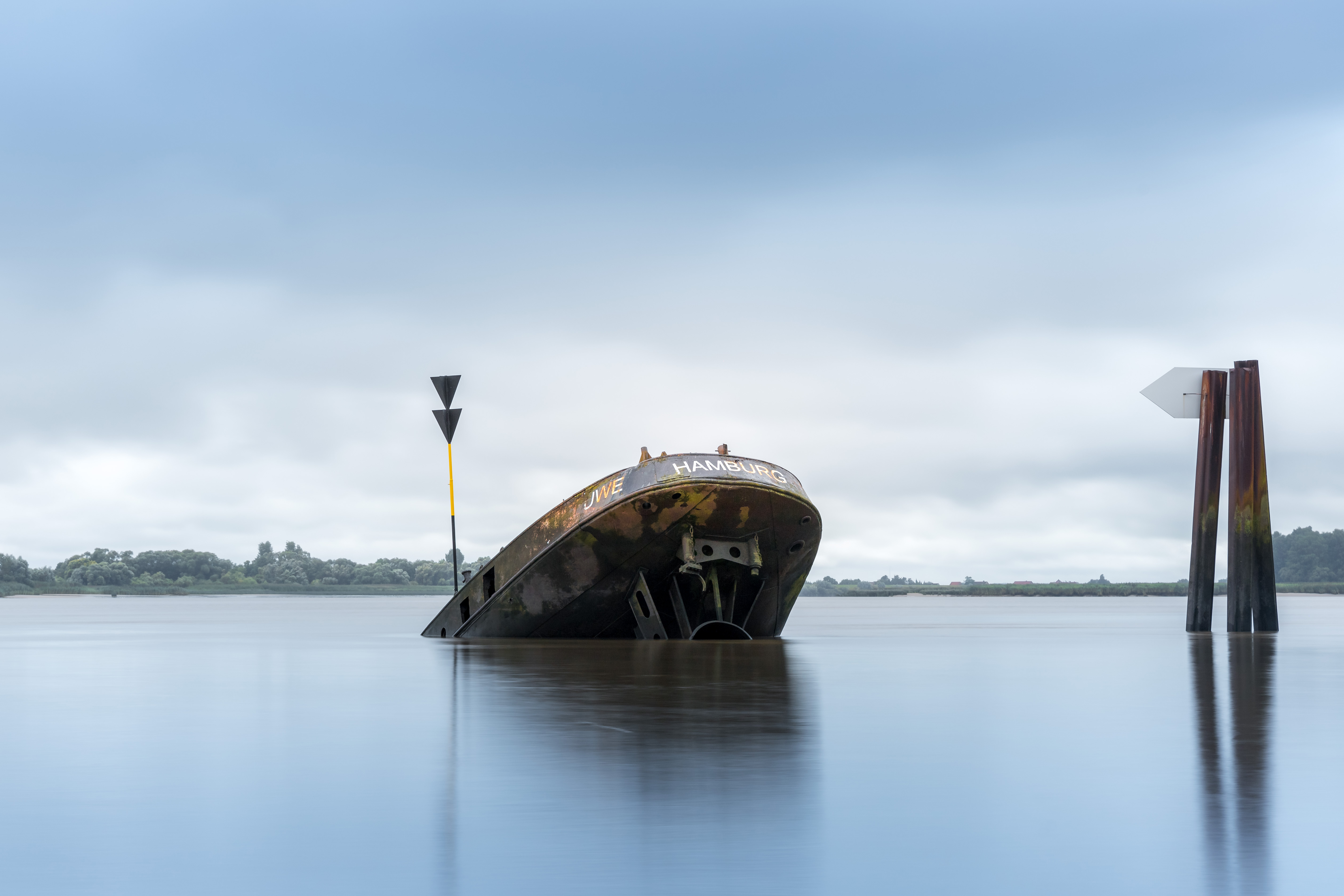
Uwe

A few meters from the Polstjernan lies what is left of the barge Uwe, sunk there in 1975 after colliding against the coaster Wiedau. The Uwe was torn into pieces and while most of these chunks had eventually been towed into the harbor, it became apparent its stern was too heavy, and was left between the Polstjernan and the Lighthouse of Blankenese, where it remains to this day.

== Notable people ==
- Rudolph Crasemann
- Johann Cesar VI. Godeffroy
- Carl Gottfried Eybe (1813–1893), painter; lived and died at Blankenese
- Karen Horney

== International relations ==
=== Twin towns – Sister cities ===
Blankenese is twinned with:

- Gladsaxe, Denmark (since 1962)
