= Buchholz in der Nordheide =

- Town
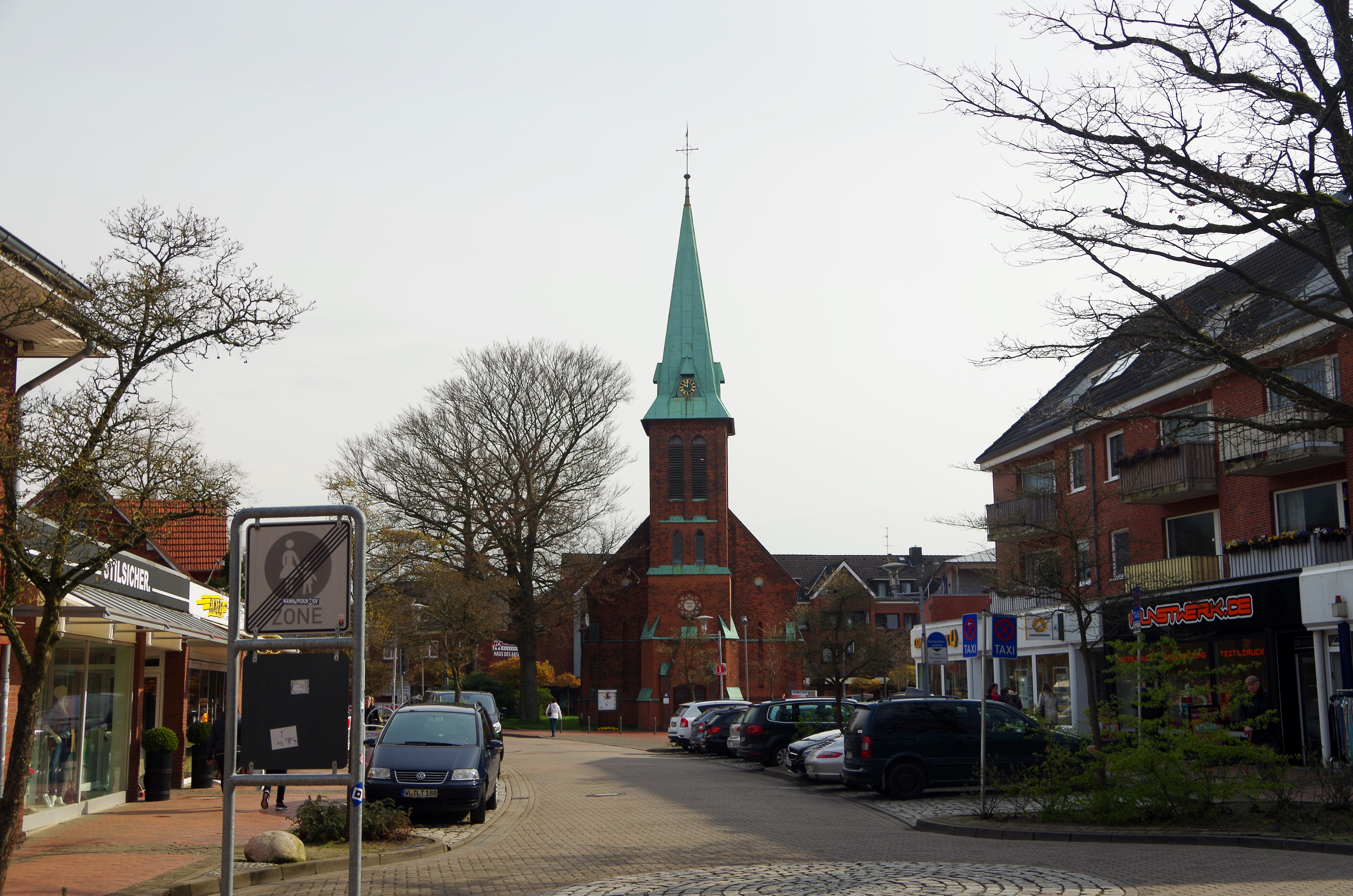
- Saint Paul church in Buchholz in der Nordheide

- Flag Coat of arms

- Location of Buchholz in der Nordheide within Harburg district
- Interactive map of Buchholz in der Nordheide
- Location within Germany Location within Lower Saxony
- Coordinates: 53°19′N 09°52′E
- Country: Germany
- State: Lower Saxony
- District: Harburg
- Subdivisions: 6 districts

Government
  - Mayor (2021–26): Jan-Hendrik Röhse (CDU)

Area
  - Total: 74.76 km^{2} (28.86 sq mi)
- Elevation: 72 m (236 ft)

Population (2025-12-31)
  - Total: 41,636
  - Density: 556.9/km^{2} (1,442/sq mi)
- Time zone: UTC+01:00 (CET)
  - Summer (DST): UTC+02:00 (CEST)
- Postal codes: 21244
- Dialling codes: 04181, 04186, 04187
- Vehicle registration: WL
- Website: www.buchholz.de

Buchholz in der Nordheide (German pronunciation: [ˈbuːxhɔlts ʔɪn deːɐ̯ ˈnɔʁthaɪdə], lit. 'Buchholz in the North Heath'; Northern Low Saxon: Bookholt) is the largest town in the district of Harburg, in Lower Saxony, in northern Germany. It is situated approximately 25 km (16 mi) southwest of Hamburg.

== Geography ==
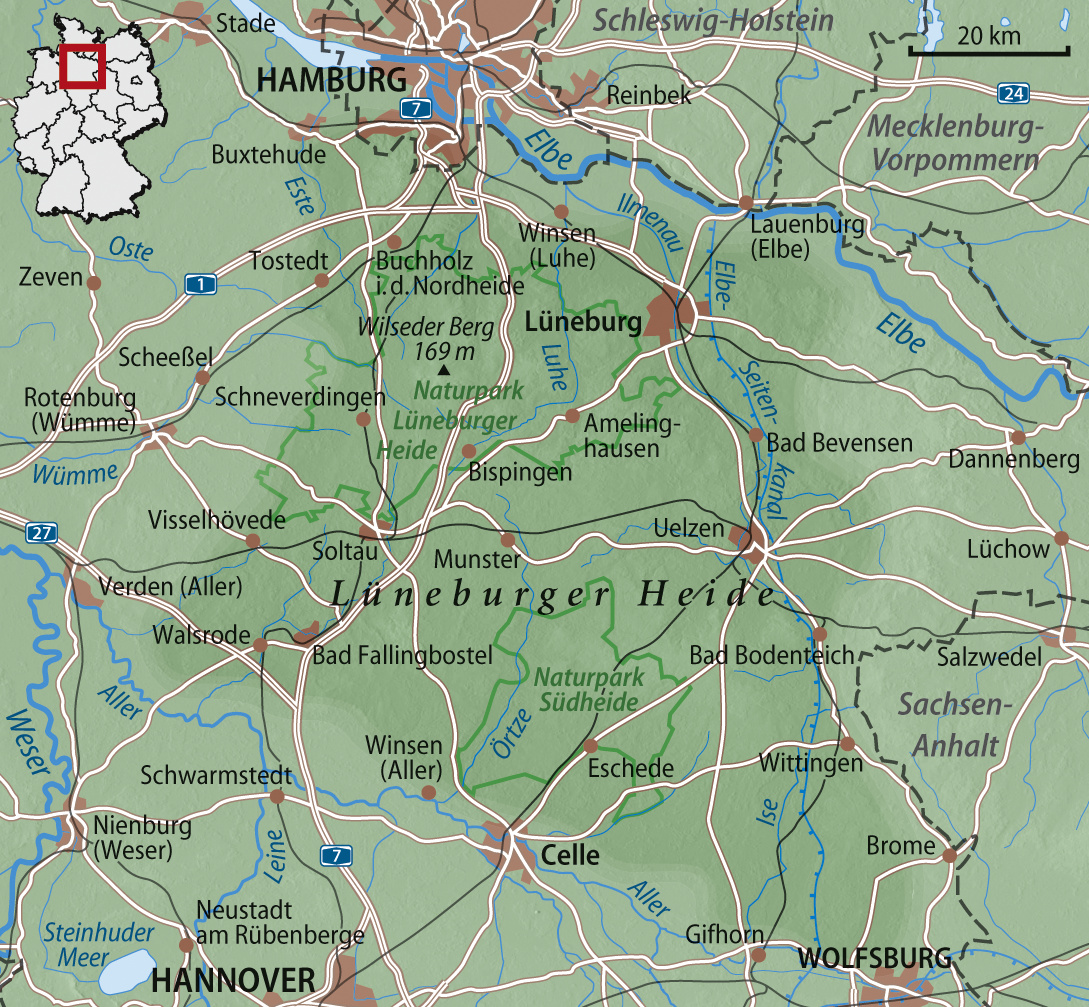

Buchholz is home to the Brunsberg, at 129m the highest mountain in the region. It is on the northern edge of the Lüneburg Heath (Lüneburger Heide), hence the suffix to the name.

== History ==
During the final stages of World War II, on 23 March 1945, Trelde (present district) was the site of a stopover during the German-organised march of Polish prisoners of war from the Oflag II-D camp to the Stalag X-B camp.

In 1958, Buchholz received its city charter.

In 1992, Buchholz was struck by a small tornado which destroyed many trees and damaged numerous houses. In 2002, the temperature in Buchholz rose above 38 degrees celsius, marking an all-time high for its region.

In 2006, Buchholz tried to set a new world record by placing a crowd of 2000 people in the form of a large heart near the local swimming pool. The attempt ultimately failed because 39 people did not show up.

== Division of the town ==
The districts of Steinbeck, Dibbersen, Seppensen, Holm-Seppensen, Sprötze and Trelde belong to Buchholz.

Districts sort by population:

- Buchholz (nucleated town)
  - District Reindorf
  - District Vaensen
  - District Buensen
- Holm-Seppensen
  - District Seppensen
  - District Holm-Seppensen
  - District Holm
- Steinbeck
  - District Steinbeck
  - District Meilsen
- Sprötze
- Trelde
  - District Trelde
  - District Suerhop
- Dibbersen
  - District Dibbersen
  - District Dangersen

== Number of inhabitants ==
- 1821 – 178
- 1871 – 350
- 1905 – 1,220
- 1925 – 2,138
- 1939 – 3,113
- 1945 – ca. 5,000
- 1946 – 6,003
- 1958 – 7,523
- 1963 – 10,364
- 1968 – 13,590
- 1972 – 15,273

After incorporations:

- 1972 – 22,620
- 1975 – 26,393
- 1998 – 35,264
- 1999 – 35,603
- 2000 – 35,916
- 2002 – 36,483
- 2004 – 38,556
- 2006 - 38,167
- 2010 - 40,234
- 2012 - 40,790

== Twin towns – sister cities ==
Buchholz in der Nordheide is twinned with:

- Canteleu, France
- Järvenpää, Finland
- Wołów, Poland

== Notable people ==
- Matthias Wolfes (born 1961), protestant theologian and church historian
- Bettina Walter (born 1971), documentary film producer
- Alexander Meier (born 1983), footballer
- Nikias Arndt (born 1991), cyclist
- Anton Stach (born 1998), footballer

=== Living in Buchholz ===
- Dieter Kottysch (born 1943), boxer, Olympic winner 1972
- Christel Wegner (born 1947), politician (DKP, Die Linke), deputy for the Landtag
- Wilhelm Leber (born 1947), mathematician, until 2013 Chief Apostle of the New Apostolic Church
