= Süllberg (Hamburg) =

Coordinates: 53°33′34″N 9°48′04″E

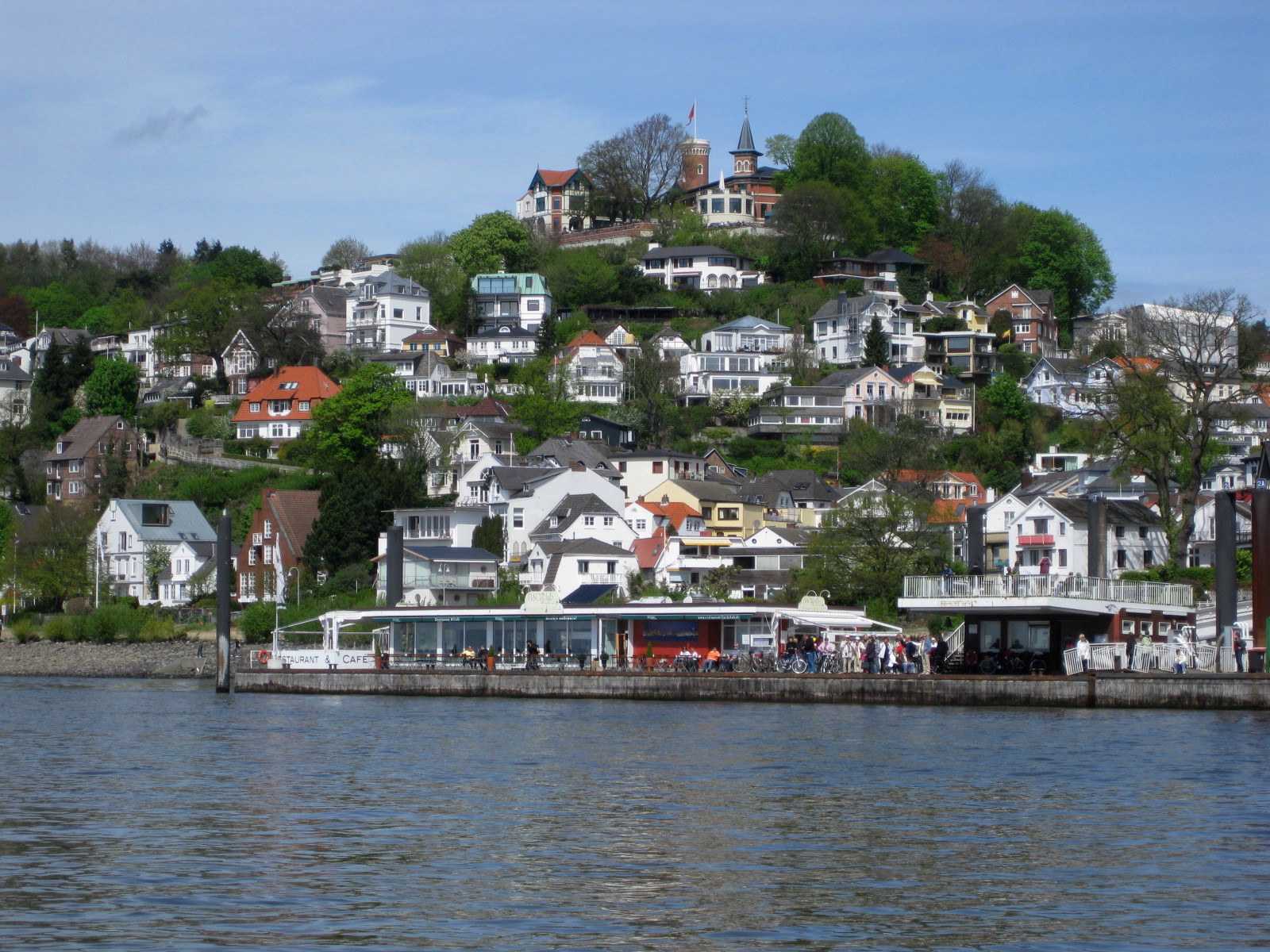
The Süllberg in 2010

The Süllberg (German pronunciation) is with a height of up to 74.7 m above sea level (NN) the third largest hill in Blankenese, Hamburg, Germany. It is part of the high shore of Blankenese. It has a rich history. In 1060/61 there was built a castle on its top by Adalbert of Hamburg. To date at the place of the former castle there is a hotel and restaurant of the well known chef Karlheinz Hauser, Hotel Süllberg. The top of the hill is owned by investor Peter Möhrle.
