= Rosengarten, Lower Saxony =

Rosengarten
- Municipality
- Flag Coat of arms

- Location of Rosengarten within Harburg district
- Interactive map of Rosengarten
- Location within Germany Location within Lower Saxony
- Coordinates: 53°23′N 09°54′E
- Country: Germany
- State: Lower Saxony
- District: Harburg
- Subdivisions: 10 Ortsteile

Government
  - Mayor (2021–26): Dirk Seidler (Ind.)

Area
  - Total: 63.67 km^{2} (24.58 sq mi)
- Elevation: 85 m (279 ft)

Population (2025-12-31)
  - Total: 13,946
  - Density: 219.0/km^{2} (567.3/sq mi)
- Time zone: UTC+01:00 (CET)
  - Summer (DST): UTC+02:00 (CEST)
- Postal codes: 21224
- Dialling codes: 04108
- Vehicle registration: WL

Rosengarten is a rural municipality in the district of Harburg, Lower Saxony, Germany, near Hamburg. It had a population of 13,242 in 2004. It was formed in 1972 as a combination of the villages of Eckel, Ehestorf (with Alvesen), Emsen, Iddensen, Klecken, Leversen, Nenndorf, Sottorf, Tötensen, and Vahrendorf, and was named for a nearby forest of the same name.

The honorary consulate of the Republic of Guinea to Hamburg has been in Rosengarten since 1990.

Dieter Bohlen lives in Tötensen.
