= Lüneburg Heath =

Landform in Lower Saxony, Germany

Coordinates: 53°10′07″N 9°56′23″E

- Classification: Handbook of Natural Region Divisions of Germany
- Level 1 Region: North German Plain
- Level 3 Region: 64 → Luneburg Heath
- State(s): Lower Saxony
- Country: Germany

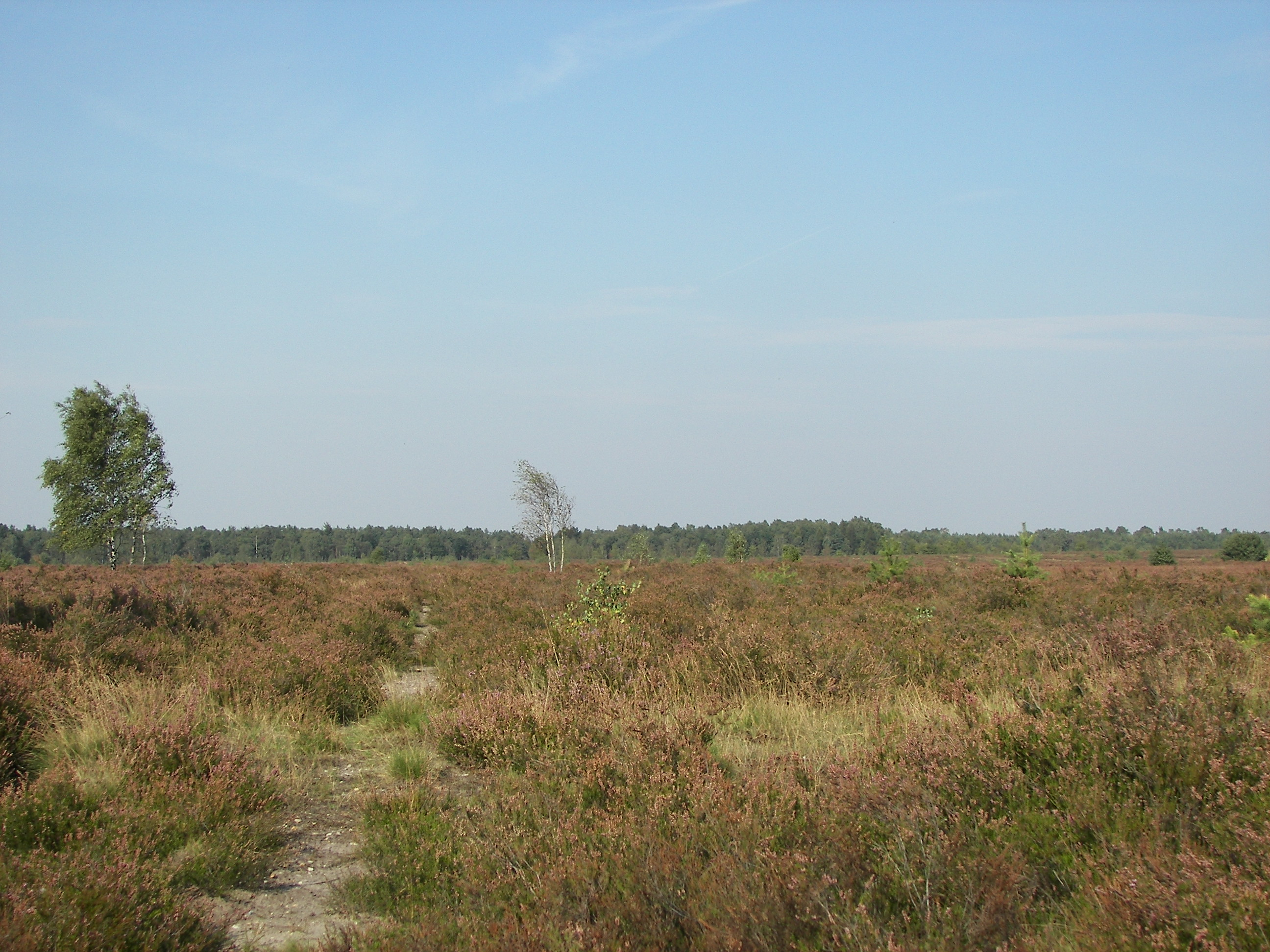
A typical view of Lüneburg Heath near Schneverdingen

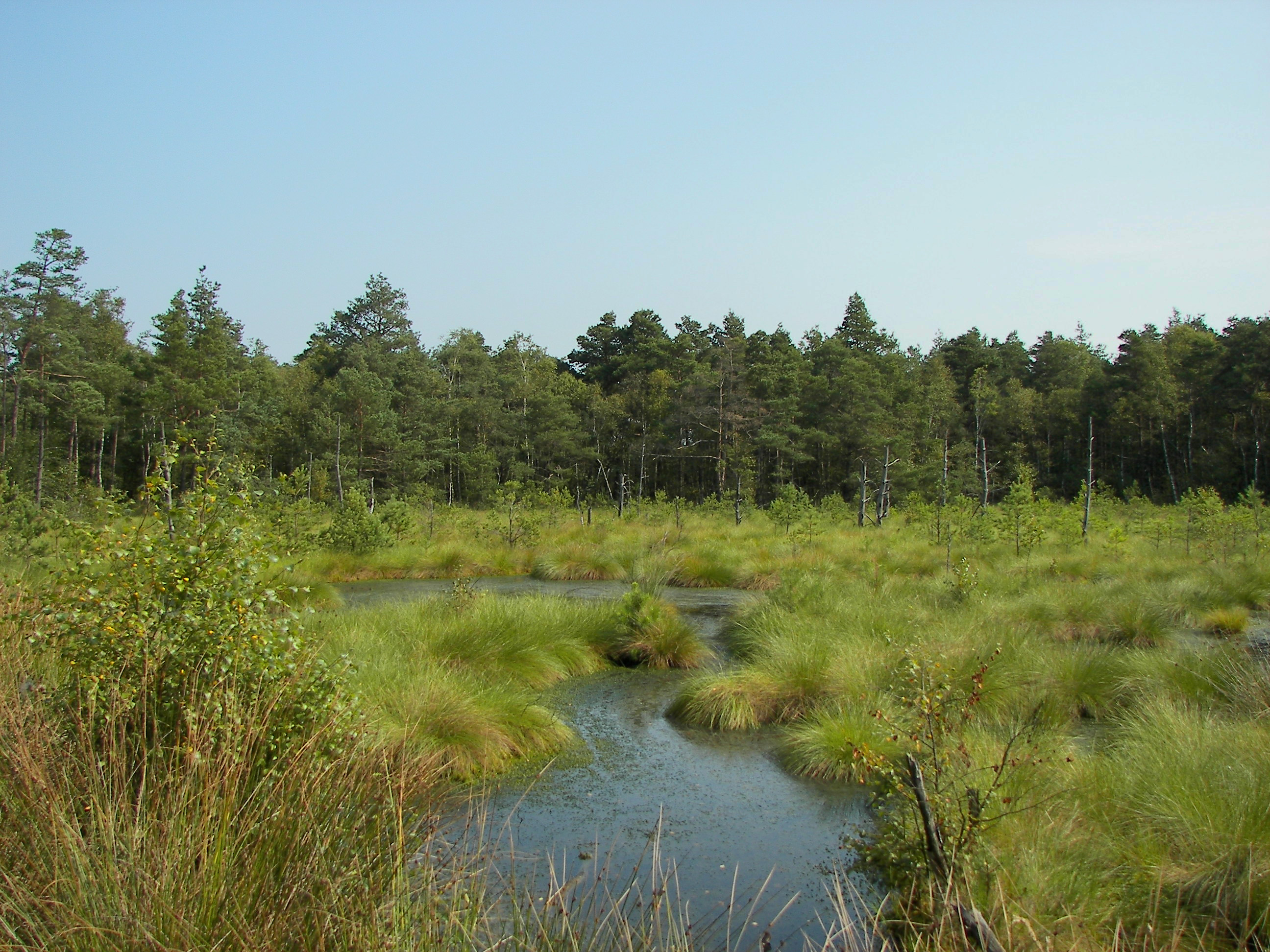
Pietzmoor near Schneverdingen

Lüneburg Heath (German: Lüneburger Heide, pronounced [ˈlyːnəbʊʁɡɐ ˈhaɪdə]) is a large area of heath, geest, and woodland in the northeastern part of the state of Lower Saxony in northern Germany. It forms part of the hinterland for the cities of Hamburg, Hanover and Bremen and is named after the town of Lüneburg. Most of the area is a nature reserve. Northern Low Saxon is still widely spoken in the region.

Lüneburg Heath has extensive areas, and the most yellow of heathland, typical of those that covered most of the North German countryside until about 1800, but which have almost completely disappeared in other areas. The heaths were formed after the Neolithic period by overgrazing of the once widespread forests on the poor sandy soils of the geest, as this slightly hilly and sandy terrain in northern Europe is called. Lüneburg Heath is therefore a historic cultural landscape. The remaining areas of heath are kept clear mainly through grazing, especially by a North German breed of moorland sheep called the Heidschnucke. Due to its unique landscape, Lüneburg Heath is a popular tourist destination in North Germany.

== Important towns ==
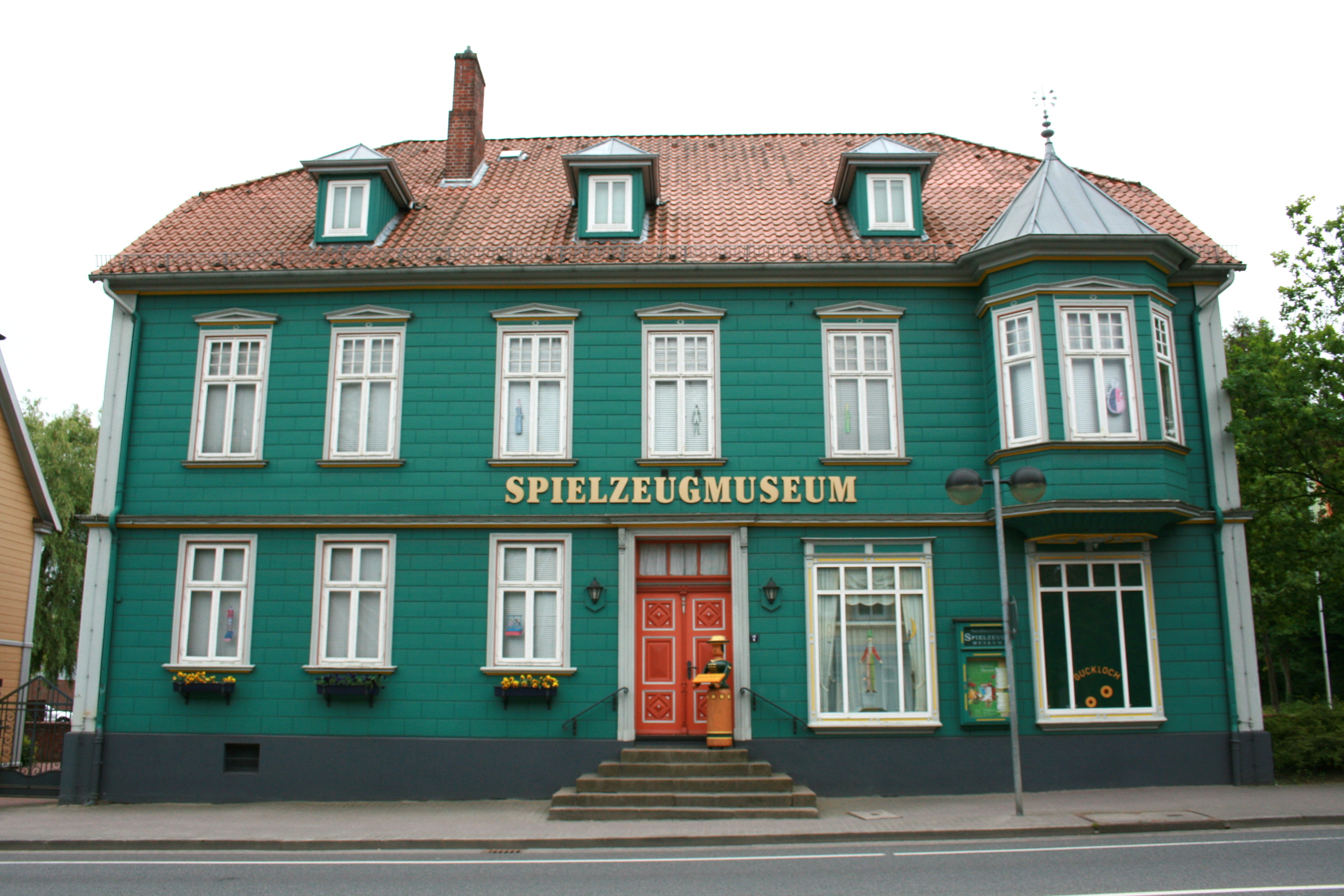
The Toy Museum in Soltau

Lüneburg Heath covers an area which includes the districts (Landkreise) of Celle, Gifhorn, Heidekreis, Uelzen, Lüneburg, Lüchow-Dannenberg, southeast Rotenburg (the town of Visselhövede, Fintel, part of the municipality of Scheeßel and the eastern half of Bothel) and the rural district of Harburg. The easternmost fringes of the Stade Geest belonging to Landkreis Verden are called the Linteln Geest (Lintelner Geest) or Verden Heath (Verdener Heide) and form part of the municipality of Kirchlinteln. This region has no sharply defined boundary with the Lüneburg Heath.

- Amelinghausen
- Bad Bevensen
- Bad Fallingbostel
- Bispingen
- Buchholz in der Nordheide
- Celle
- Gifhorn
- Hermannsburg
- Lüneburg
- Munster
- Schneverdingen
- Soltau
- Uelzen
- Walsrode
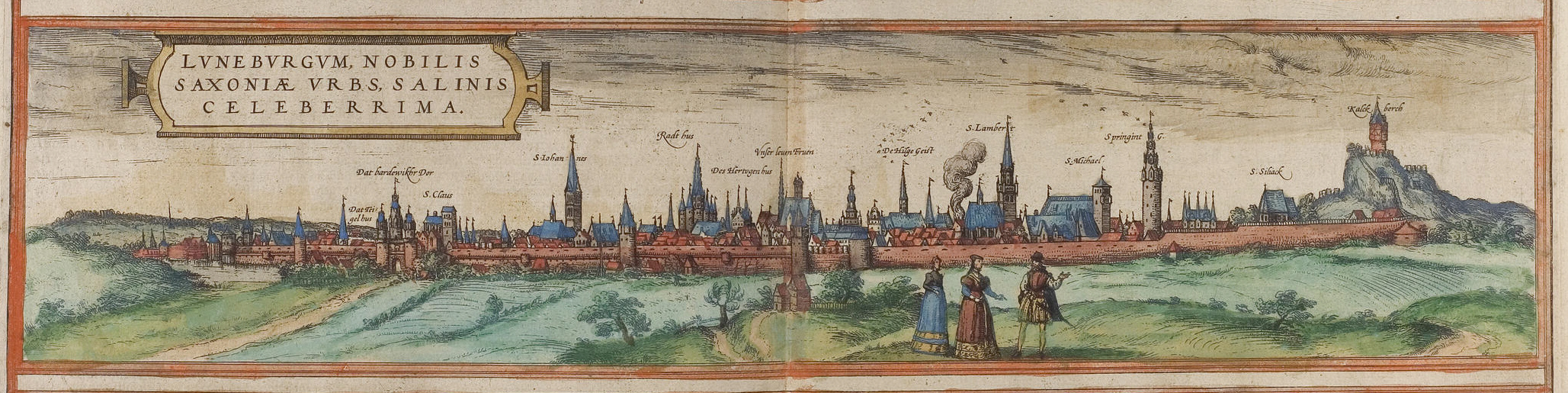
Cityscape of Lüneburg in the 16th-century atlas Civitates Orbis Terrarum, published in its first volume, in 1572

== Tourism ==
Today the area is a popular tourist destination. Contributing to this are the theme park, Heidepark Soltau, the Walsrode Bird Park, the Serengeti Safari Park at Hodenhagen, Snow Dome Bispingen, and a Center Parc as well as the many farms offering holiday stays, making the Lüneburg Heath especially popular for families. Another group of tourists are the elderly on free guided bus tours (Kaffeefahrten), stopping for coffee and wool plaids at a farm before touring Lüneburg for an hour.

The Kunststätte Bossard in the Nordheide near Jesteburg is an expressionist Gesamtkunstwerk open to the public.

The memorial exhibition at the former Bergen-Belsen concentration camp near the town of Bergen is also located in the Lüneburg Heath.

== Geography ==
=== Location ===
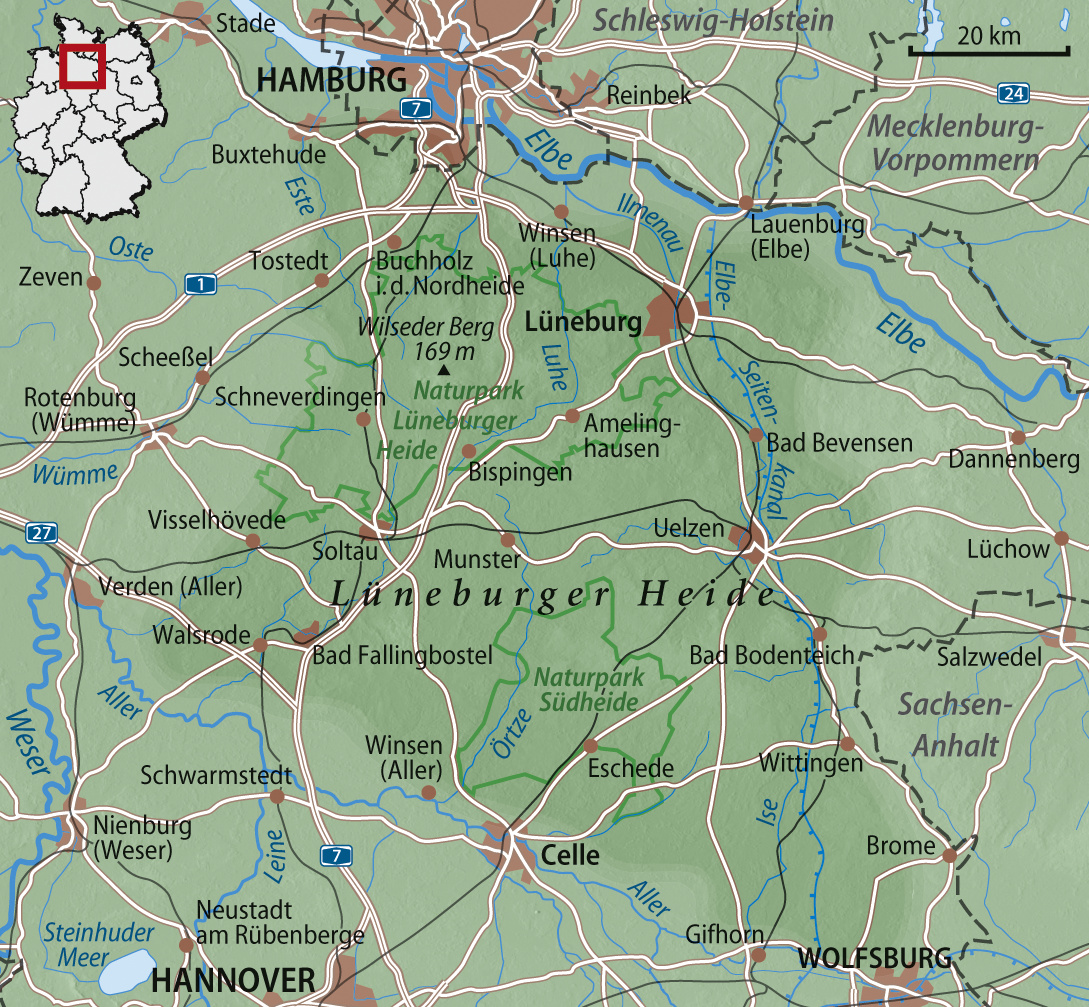
Map of Lüneburg Heath

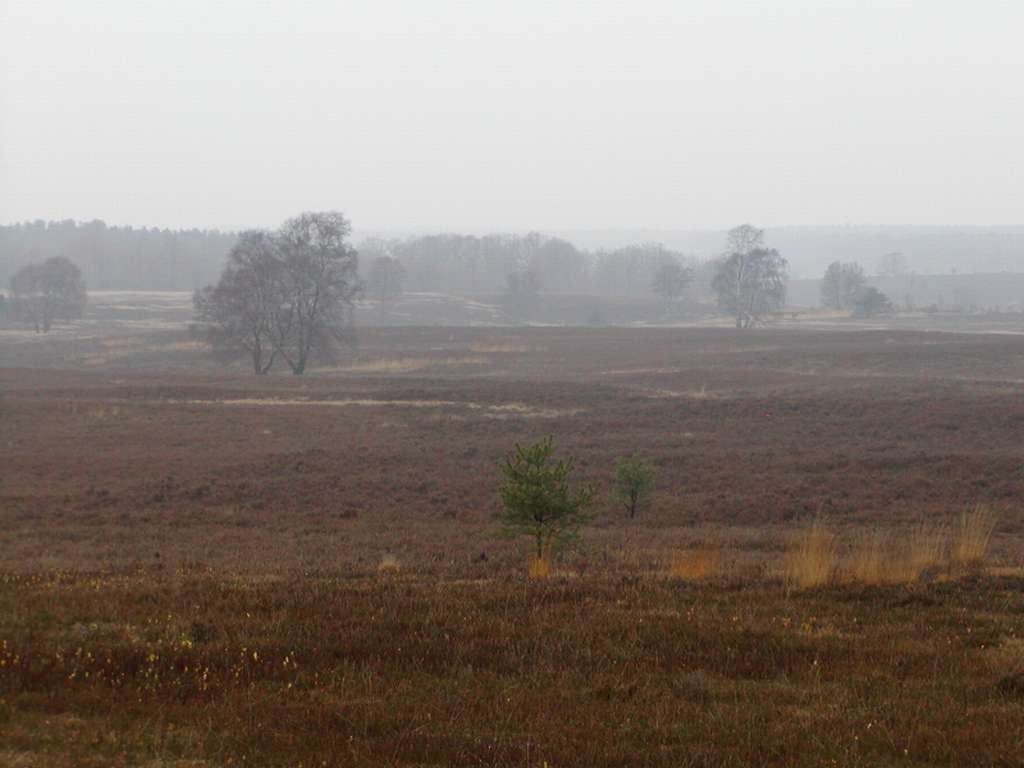
Lüneburg Heath

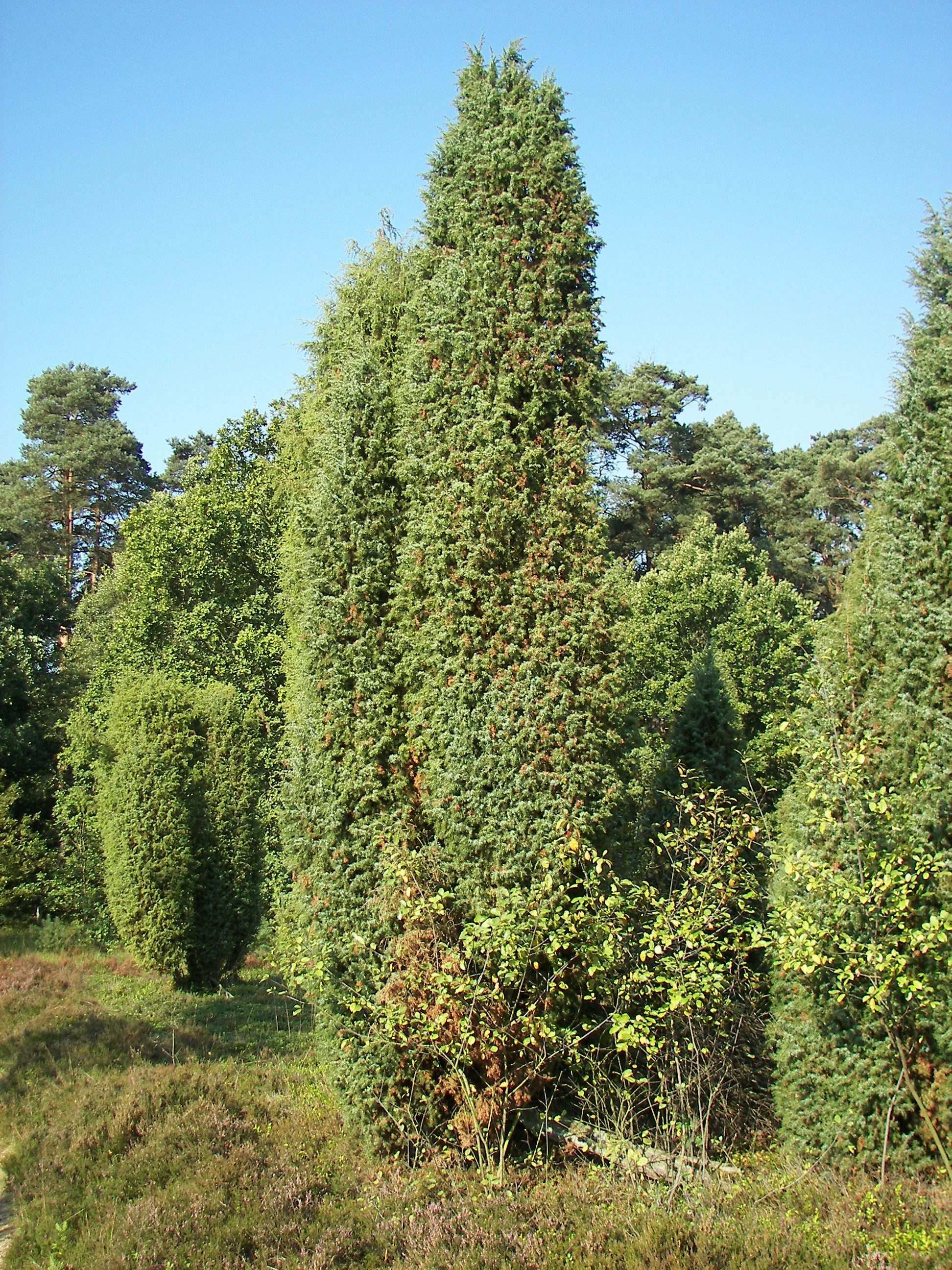
Common juniper (Juniperus communis) on Lüneburg Heath

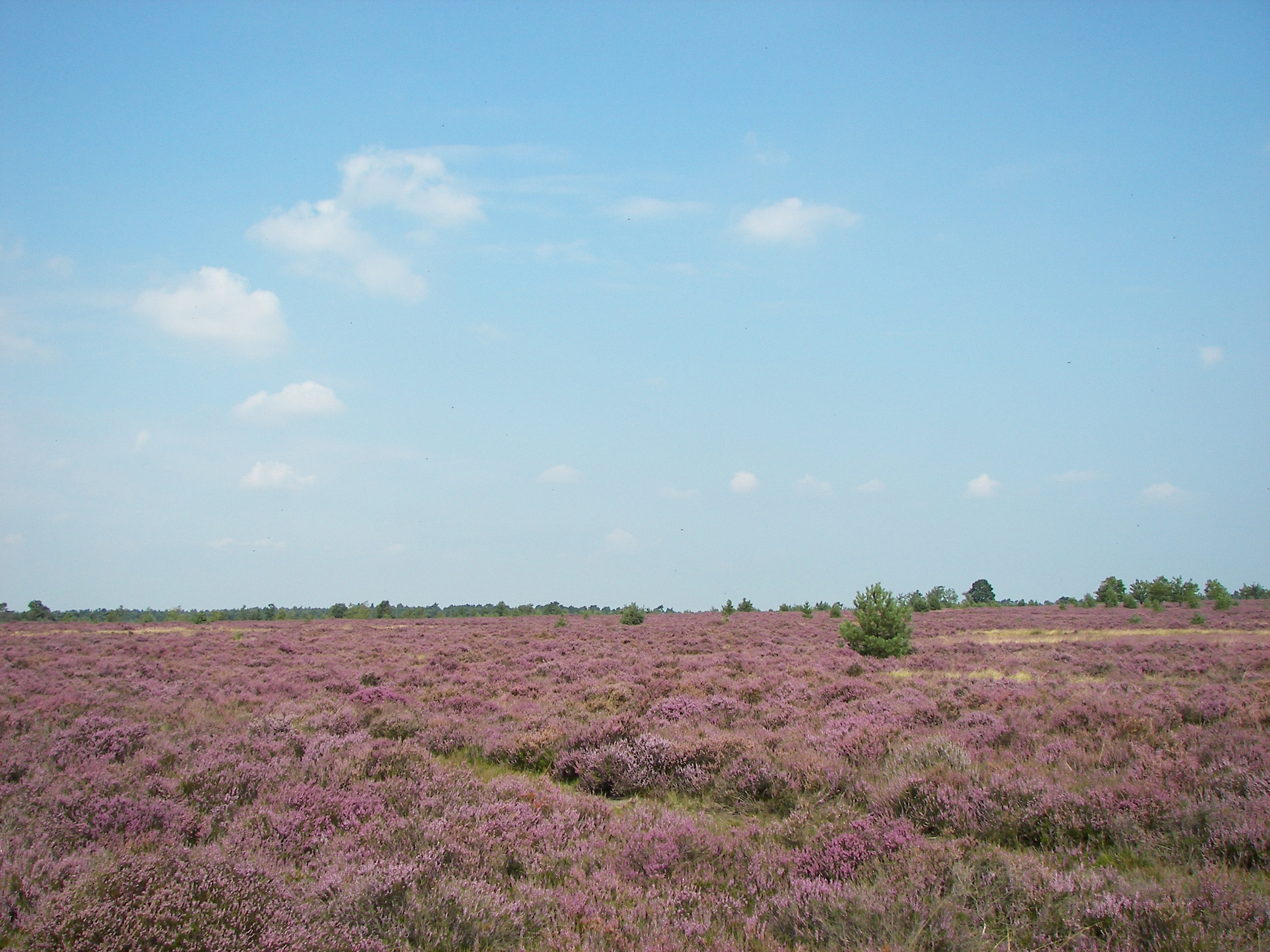
Sandy heathland on Lüneburg Heath

From a geographical point of view, Lüneburg Heath is a specific natural region, that is an area distinguished by a specific combination of abiotic factors (climate, relief, water resources, soil, geology) and biotic factors (flora and fauna). Lüneburg Heath is a sub-division of the North European Plain. In the list of the major natural regions of Germany issued by the Federal Office for Nature Conservation (Bundesamt für Naturschutz) it is region number D28.

Lüneburg Heath lies between the rivers Elbe to the north, the Drawehn to the east, the Aller to the south and southwest, the middle course of the Wümme to the west and the Harburg Hills (Harburger Berge) to the northwest.

On the northwestern edge of Lüneburg Heath are the Harburg Hills and south of Schneverdingen there are bogs, such as the Pietzmoor. Also of note are other smaller bogs in sinkholes, like the Grundloses Moor ("bottomless bog") near Walsrode or the Bullenkuhle near Bokel (part of Sprakensehl). The eastern boundary to the Wendland is formed by the Göhrde-Drawehn Hills (the Ostheide natural region). Parts of Lüneburg Heath are in the Südheide Nature Park, others in the Lüneburg Heath Nature Park.

=== Hills and elevations ===
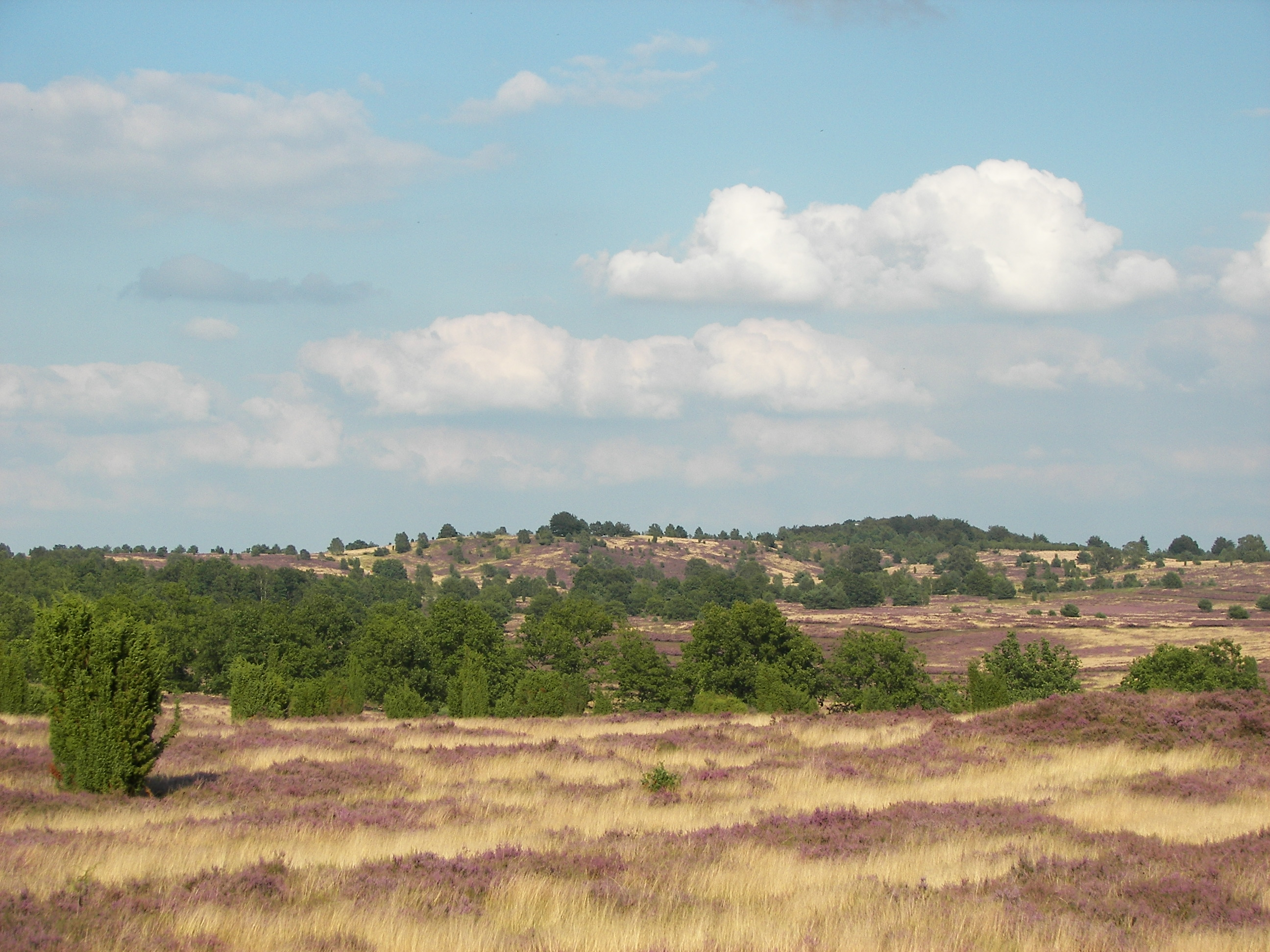
Wilseder Berg

The highest elevation on Lüneburg Heath is the Wilseder Berg (169.2 metres (555 ft)) above NN). Other hills over 100 metres (330 ft) high are: Falkenberg (150 metres (490 ft)), near Bergen, Ahrberg (145 metres (476 ft)), Hakenberg (143 metres (469 ft)), Hoher Mechtin (142 metres (466 ft)), Pampower Berg (140 metres (460 ft)), Lüßberg (130 metres (430 ft)), Brunsberg, near Sprötze (129 metres (423 ft)), Goldbockenberg (129 metres (423 ft)), Hingstberg (126 metres (413 ft)), Staffelberg (126 metres (413 ft)), Hengstberg (121 metres (397 ft)), Höpenberg near Schneverdingen (120 metres (390 ft)), Haußelberg (119.1 metres (391 ft)), Breithorn (118 metres (387 ft)), Mützenberg (115 metres (377 ft)), Tellmer Berg (113 metres (371 ft)), Wümmeberg (107.9 metres (354 ft)), Schiffberg (107 metres (351 ft)), Hummelsberg and Wulfsberg (each 106 metres (348 ft)), Drullberg and Thonhopsberg (each 104 metres (341 ft)), Kruckberg and Wietzer Berg (each 102 metres (335 ft)) and Höllenberg (101 metres (331 ft)).

Several of these hills - the Wilseder Berg, the Falkenberg, the Haußelberg and the Breithorn - were used by the mathematician, Carl Friedrich Gauss, as triangulation stations in his topographical surveys of the Kingdom of Hanover from 1821 to 1825.

=== Rivers and streams ===
Rivers in the area, beside the numerous small heathland streams, include the Wümme, which rises on the western slopes of the Wilseder Berg, in the south the Lachte with its tributary the Lutter, and the Aller, the Vissel, the Böhme, the Grindau, the Meiße and the Örtze. They all belong to the Weser river system. Those flowing into the Elbe are the Aue, the Ilmenau, the Luhe and the Seeve.

=== Geology ===
The immediate subsurface layers on Lüneburg Heath are almost exclusively made up of deposits from the quaternary ice age. The landscape consists of flat plains of ground moraines, ridges of hilly terminal moraines and also of sandar - glacial outwash plains deposited at the edge of the ice sheet.

During the Saalian Stage (230,000–130,000 years ago) the area of the present-day Lüneburg Heath was covered three times by a continental ice sheet. In the last glacial period (110,000–10,000 years ago) the ice sheet no longer covered the Lüneburg Heath area; it reached only as far as the River Elbe. Due to the lack of vegetation, the much more rugged terrain at that time was heavily eroded by water, wind and by soil fluction; this resulted in valleys like the Totengrund. The material displaced by erosion, referred to as sediment (Geschiebedecksand), has a depth of 0.4 to 0.8 metres (on slopes up to 1.5 metres).

The region is mostly covered by a heathland landscape consisting of big heather and juniper areas, forests and some smaller swamps. In contrast to the areas in the north of Lüneburg Heath, the landscape is very hilly, as it is placed on a terminal moraine.

=== Natural divisions ===
Lüneburg Heath is divided into the following natural sub-divisions:

- Hohe Heide

The Hohe Heide ("High Heath") consists of a series of end moraines from the glaciers of the Saalian glaciation (230,000–130,000 years ago) with the Wilseder Berg at its heart. Unlike the other natural divisions of Lüneburg Heath, the terrain is quite rugged. Characteristic of the area are dry hilltops, periglacial dry valleys and hollows like the Totengrund. Heathland dominates the landscape. They are part of the Lüneburg Heath Nature Park and of great importance for tourism. In addition there are also extensive pine forests.

- South Heath

The South Heath (Südheide) is dominated by expanses of gently undulating, hilly Sander plains, and sheets of ground moraine and the remains of end moraines from earlier ice ages. There are still large areas of heath on the military training areas near Bad Fallingbostel and Munster (Örtze); these are out-of-bounds to visitors however. The Osterheide near Schneverdingen also belongs to this natural subdivision. It is part of the Lüneburg Heath Nature Reserve. Near Schneverdingen and south of Soltau there are several bogs. A large area of the Südheide is covered by pine forests.

- Ostheide

Numerous end moraines run through the Ostheide ("East Heath") which stretches on the eastern edge of Lüneburg Heath from Lüneburg to north of Wolfsburg. In parts of this region the land is intensively cultivated. The northern area, the so-called Göhrde and the Drawehn, are by contrast mostly wooded like the southern ridge of end moraine.

- Uelzen Basin and Ilmenau depression

The ground moraine landscape of the Uelzen Basin is predominantly used for agriculture. On the surrounding ridges there are also a few pine forests however. There are still large areas of heath here as well, for example the Ellerndorfer Heide ("Ellerndorf Heath") in western Uelzen district or the Klein Bünstorfer Heide ("Klein Bünstorf Heath").

- Luheheide

The ridges of end moraine on the Luheheide have clearly defined slopes that fall away sharply to the Elbe Valley. The heath is deeply incised by all the rivers that drain northwards to the Elbe; rivers such as the Seeve, Aue, Luhe (Ilmenau). The ridges between them are wooded and sparsely populated. Settlements are crowded together in the valleys. There is hardly any heathland left in this area, it has been largely reforested by pines.

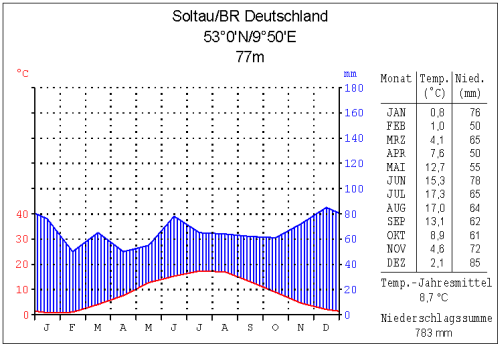
Climatic diagram for Soltau

=== Climate ===
Lüneburg Heath lies in a temperate maritime climatic region moderated by the Atlantic, with mild winters, cool summers and precipitation all-year round. The Hohe Heide, however, has a "low mountain climate" with lower temperatures and higher precipitation than in the surrounding area.

== Nature ==
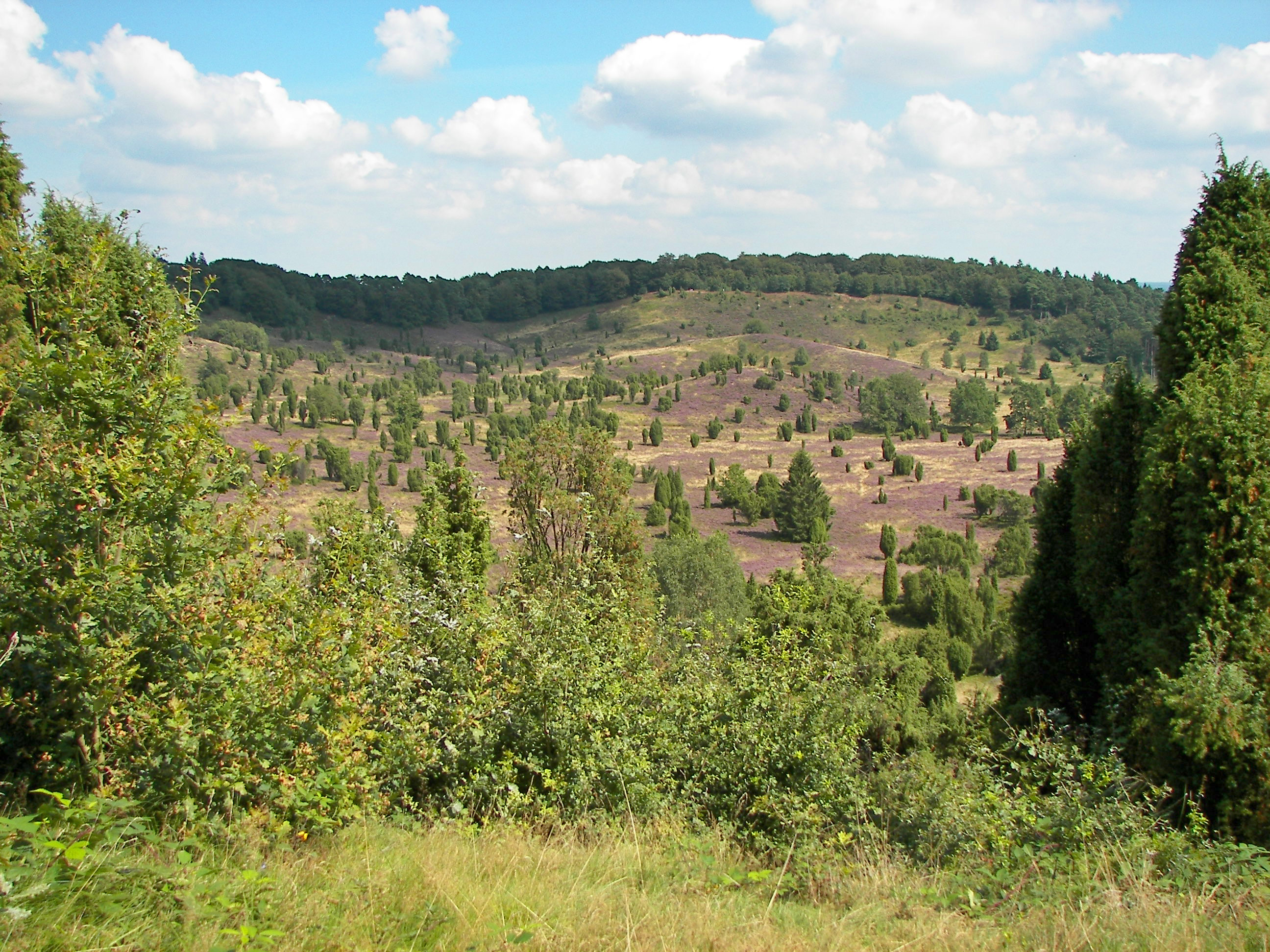
Totengrund (Wilseder Berg)

=== Nature parks and nature reserves ===
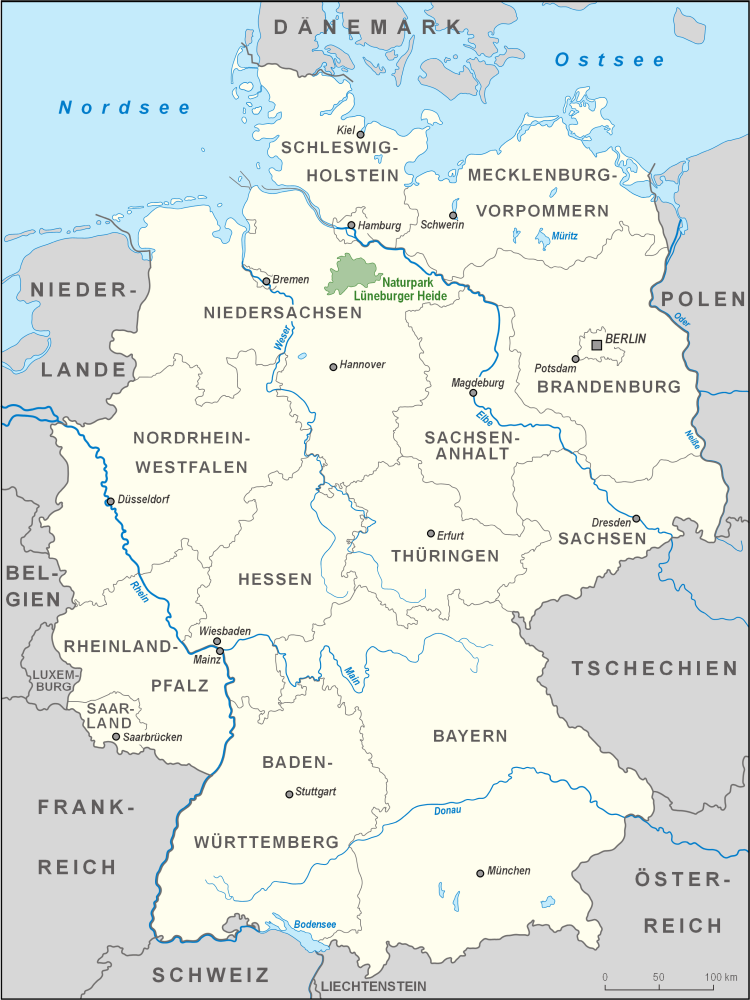
Location of the Lüneburg Heath Nature Park

In the northwestern part of Lüneburg Heath is the Lüneburg Heath Nature Park which covers an area of 1,130 square kilometres (440 sq mi). At its heart, around the Wilseder Berg, is the Lüneburg Heath Nature Reserve (Naturschutzgebiet or NSG) founded as long ago as 1921 with 234 square kilometres (90 sq mi) of land which is roughly 58% woods and 20% heathland. Other nature parks in the Lüneburg Heath region are the Südheide Nature Park and Elbufer-Drawehn Nature Park. Right in the north of the area is the Harburg Hills Nature Park. The Lüneburg Heath NSG, together with the open heathland of the huge Munster Nord and Süd training areas and the Bergen-Hohne Training Area, is the largest single area of heathland in Central Europe. And within the former province (Regierungsbezirk) of Lüneburg there are no less than 212 individual nature reserves (as at 31 December 2006).

=== Formation of the heath landscape ===
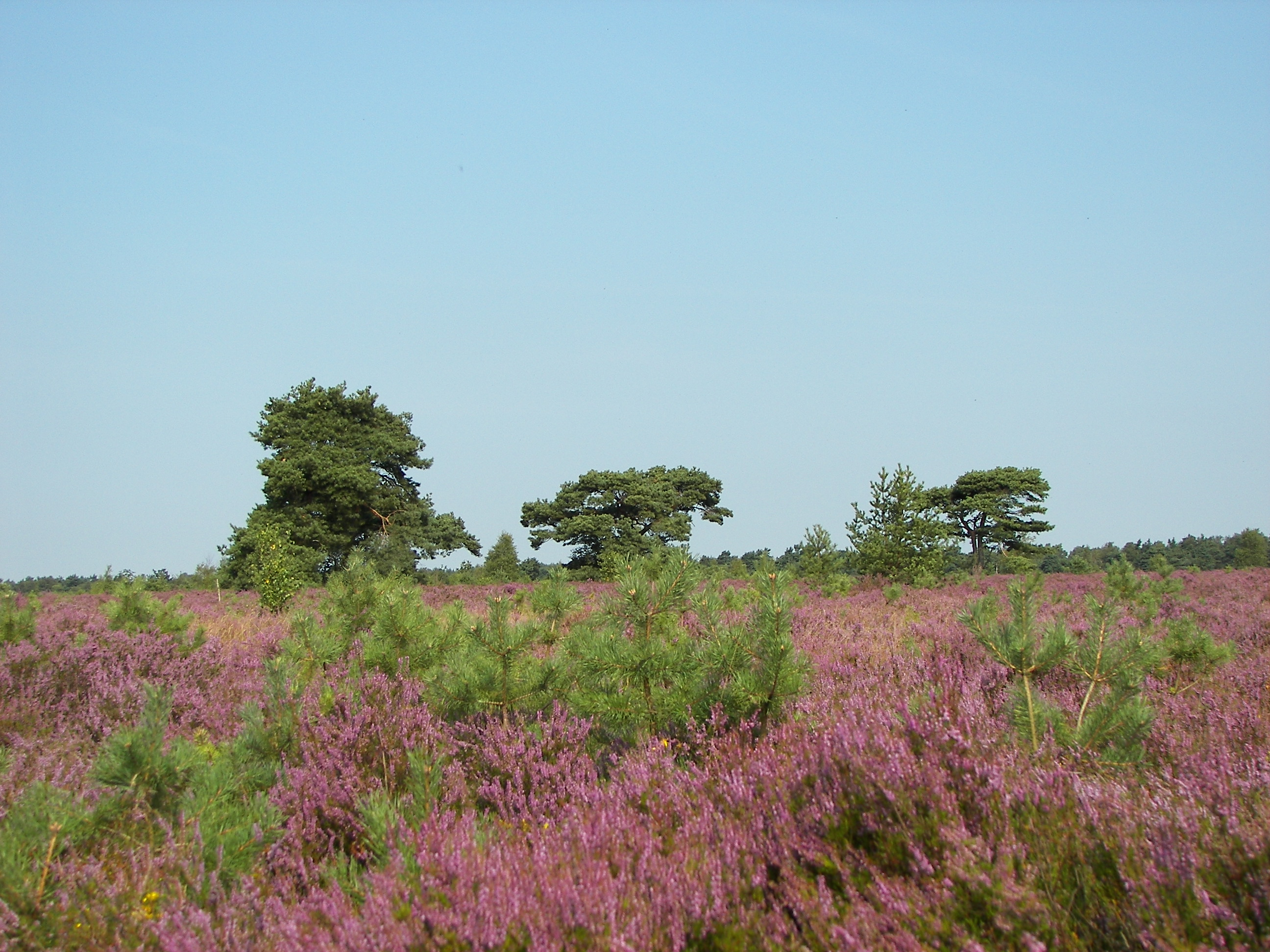
Lüneburg Heath

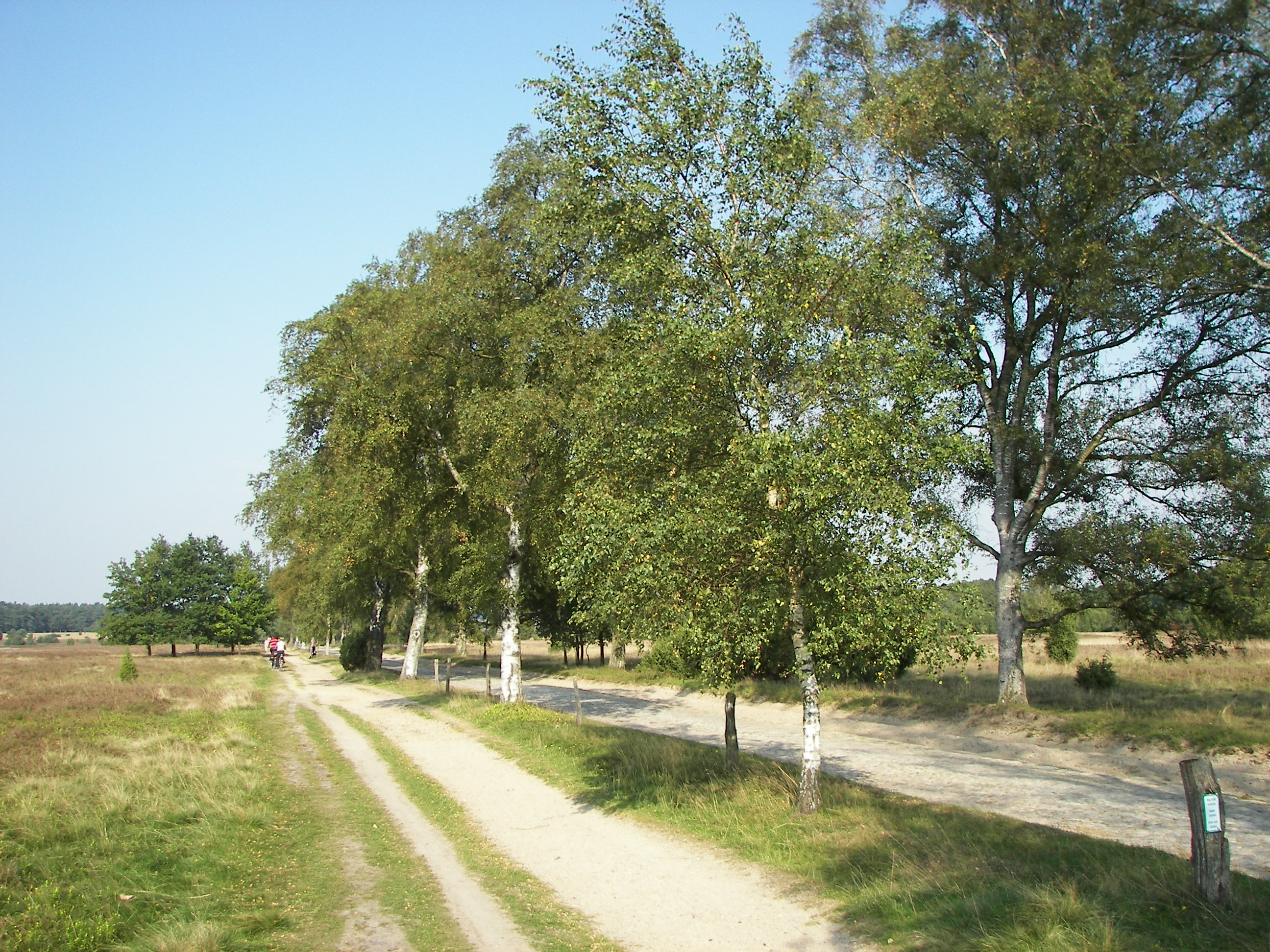
Path near Undeloh

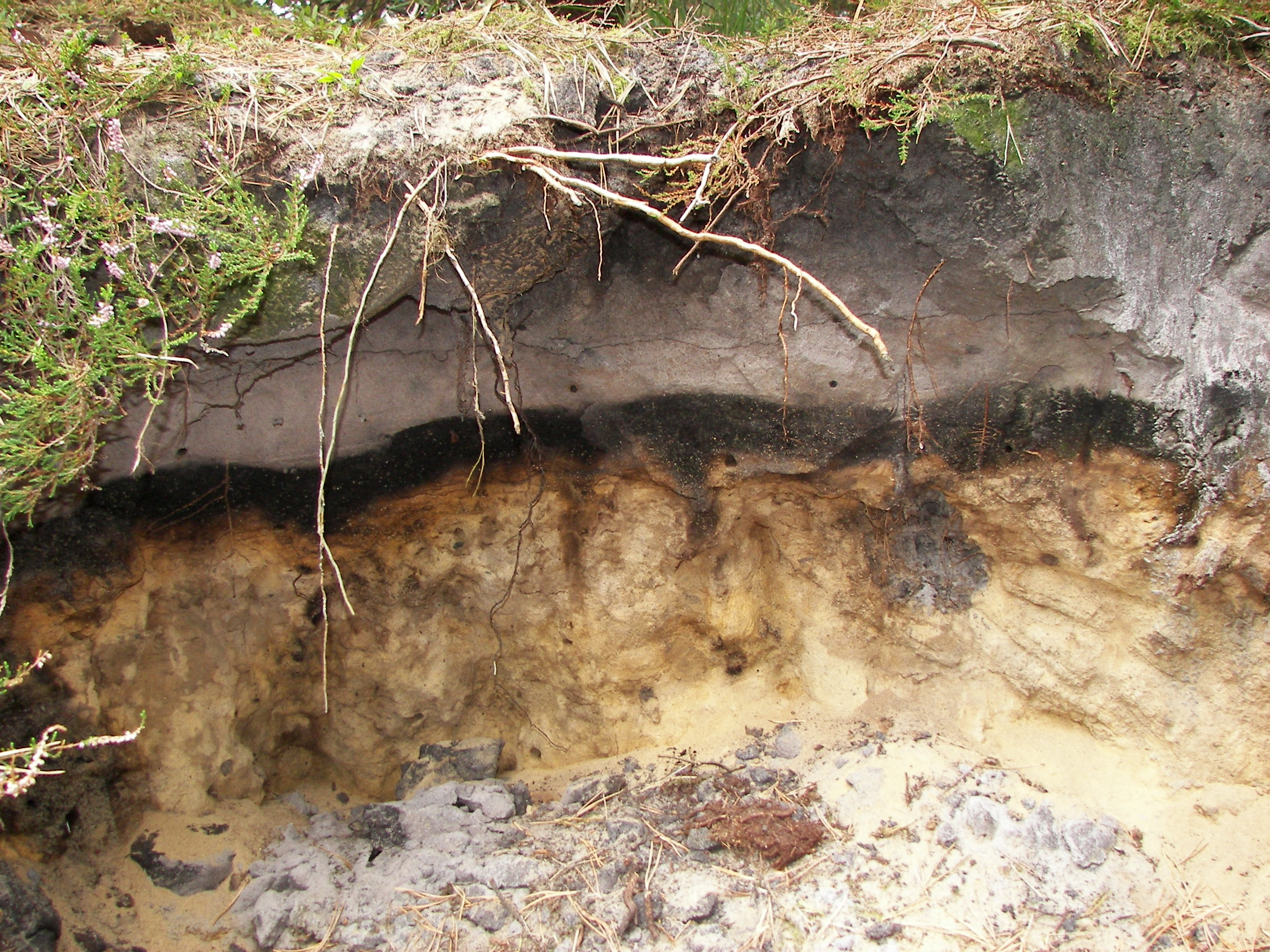
Soil profile of heath podsol showing the hardpan

After the end of the Weichselian Ice Age (115,000 to 10,000 years ago) the first woods appeared in the area that now forms Lüneburg Heath which, following the natural ecological succession and encouraged by a gradual improvement in the climate, progressed from birch and pine forest through hazel woods to light woods of sessile oaks.

The heath and its surrounding area belong to those regions of the North German Plain in which the hunter culture of the Mesolithic era was superseded quite early on by Neolithic farmers. By about 3000 BC, during the Neolithic, large open areas appeared on the lightly undulating, sandy stretches of geest on Lüneburg Heath. This was a result of the intensive grazing of the sessile oak woods and the associated destruction of successive new stands of trees. These open areas became dominated by the common heather (Calluna vulgaris), a largely grazing-resistant species of plant. Nevertheless, oak and beech woods succeeded time and again in establishing themselves wherever man left areas of heath untended. Over a long period of time the region of Lüneburg Heath alternated between periods when the heathlands spread and dominated the scene and times when it was largely covered with forest and only small areas of heath existed. Finally, after the migration period, the wooded areas of the region increased considerably.

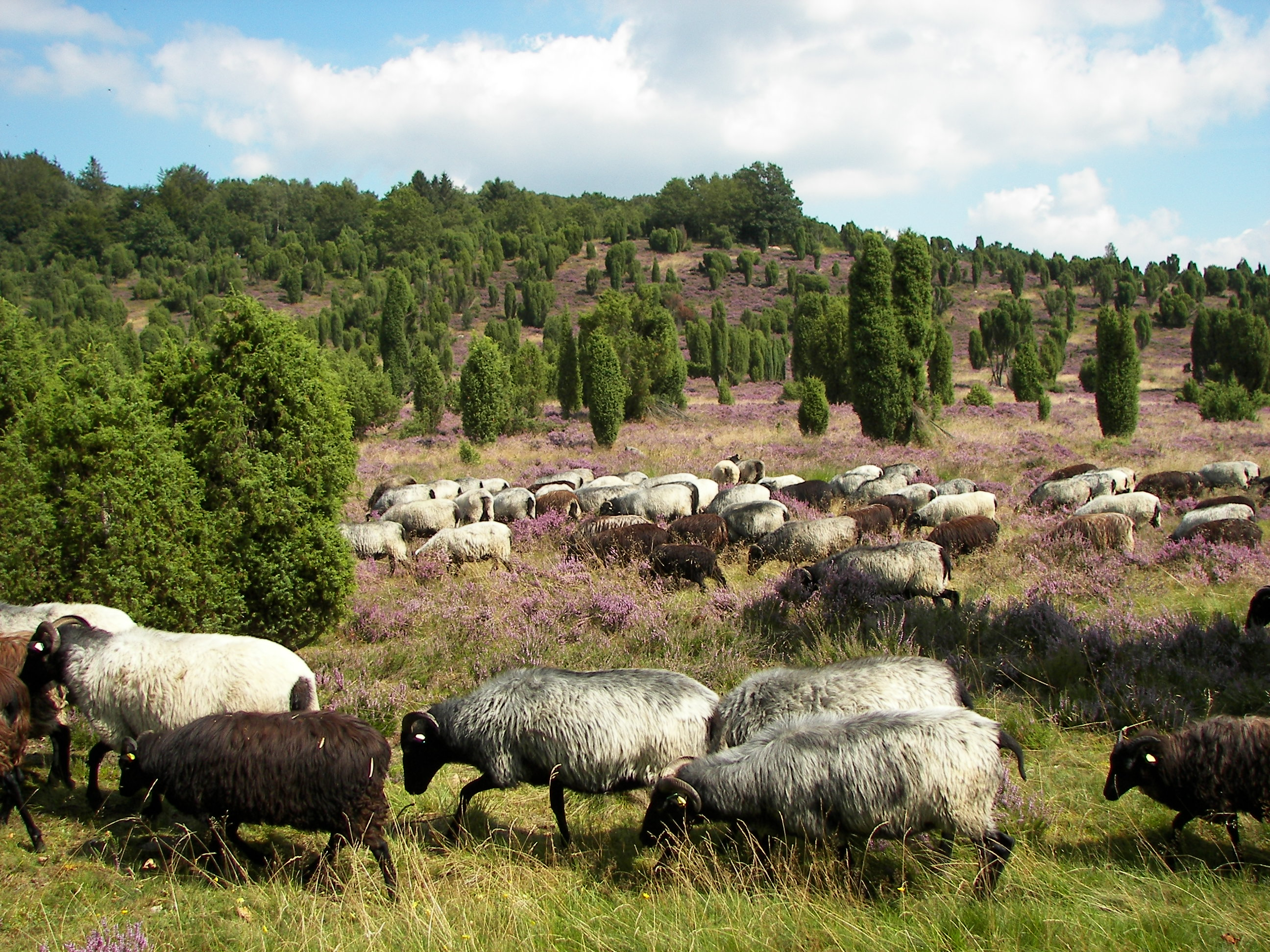
Herd of Heidschnucken (moorland sheep)

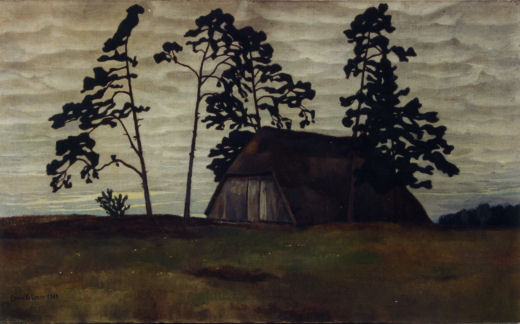
The sheep-cote, a distinctive building now rarely preserved, painting by Erwin Vollmer 1904

Not until after 1000 AD does the pollen analysis show a continuous reduction in the woodlands and a considerable increase in heather. This was brought about by a change from nomadic farming to settled farming with permanent settlements. The typical heath farming economy emerged: due to the poor soils the few available nutrients from a large area were concentrated on relatively small fields, from which grain, in particular, could be produced. This was achieved by the regular removal of the turf (a method known as Plaggen), which was used as hay for the pens of the moorland sheep, the Heidschnucken. This was then enriched with the manure and urine of the sheep – and spread over the fields as fertiliser.

By cutting the turf the regenerative capacity of the soils was exhausted. The regular removal of the top layer of soil contributed to the spreading of heathland. As heather decomposes, the pH value of the soil falls drastically, as far as the iron buffer-region at pH 3, which initiates the process of podsolisation. Soil life is severely damaged, which results in a hard layer of earth underneath the root zone on the heath at a depth of about 40 centimetres (16 in). The iron and humus particles released by the topsoil precipitate onto this impervious hardpan. The subsoil thus separates itself from the topsoil. The nutrients are largely washed out of the topsoil which leads to leaching and causes the typical grey-white coloration of the paths on the heath.

The oft-expressed view in the literature that the heath arose in the Middle Ages as a result of the demand for wood by the Lüneburg salt pans is incorrect. The Lüneburg salt ponds certainly needed firewood for the production of salt, but they did not appear until around 1000 AD, by which time the heath had already been around for 4,000 years. The amount required, even in the heyday of production, could have been continuously supplied by an area of woodland about 50 km^{2} in area, yet the heath covers over 7000 km^{2}. In any case the wood certainly did not come from the heath, but via the waterways, especially from Mecklenburg up the Elbe and from the area of the Schaalsee. Transportation overland would have been far too expensive (apart from the River Ilmenau which was navigable at the time, no rivers flow from the main areas of heathland to Lüneburg), as can be seen not only from some of the delivery notes which still survive, but also from the fact that there are still large woods around Lüneburg itself, such as the Göhrde. Finally heathland has frequently developed in areas where there are no salt pans, such as the sheep-grazing regions on the coasts of Norway to Portugal and in Scotland and Ireland.

The heath is not therefore a natural landscape, but a cultural landscape created by the intervention of man. In order to prevent its semi-open heathland from being repopulated by trees, especially pines and, to a lesser extent, silver birches, which would cause the loss of this millennia-old environment and its many inhabitants, including often very rare animal and plant species, sheep are allowed to graze it regularly; these are almost exclusively the local German moorland sheep, the Heidschnucke.

=== Plant population/Phytocenosis ===
In the 20th century, numerous conservation measures were implemented on Lüneburg Heath; as a result, it is one of the best researched regions of central Europe.

==== Heathland ====
Sand heaths form about 20% of the Lüneburg Heath Nature Reserve and may be broken down into further sub-divisions, the most important being:

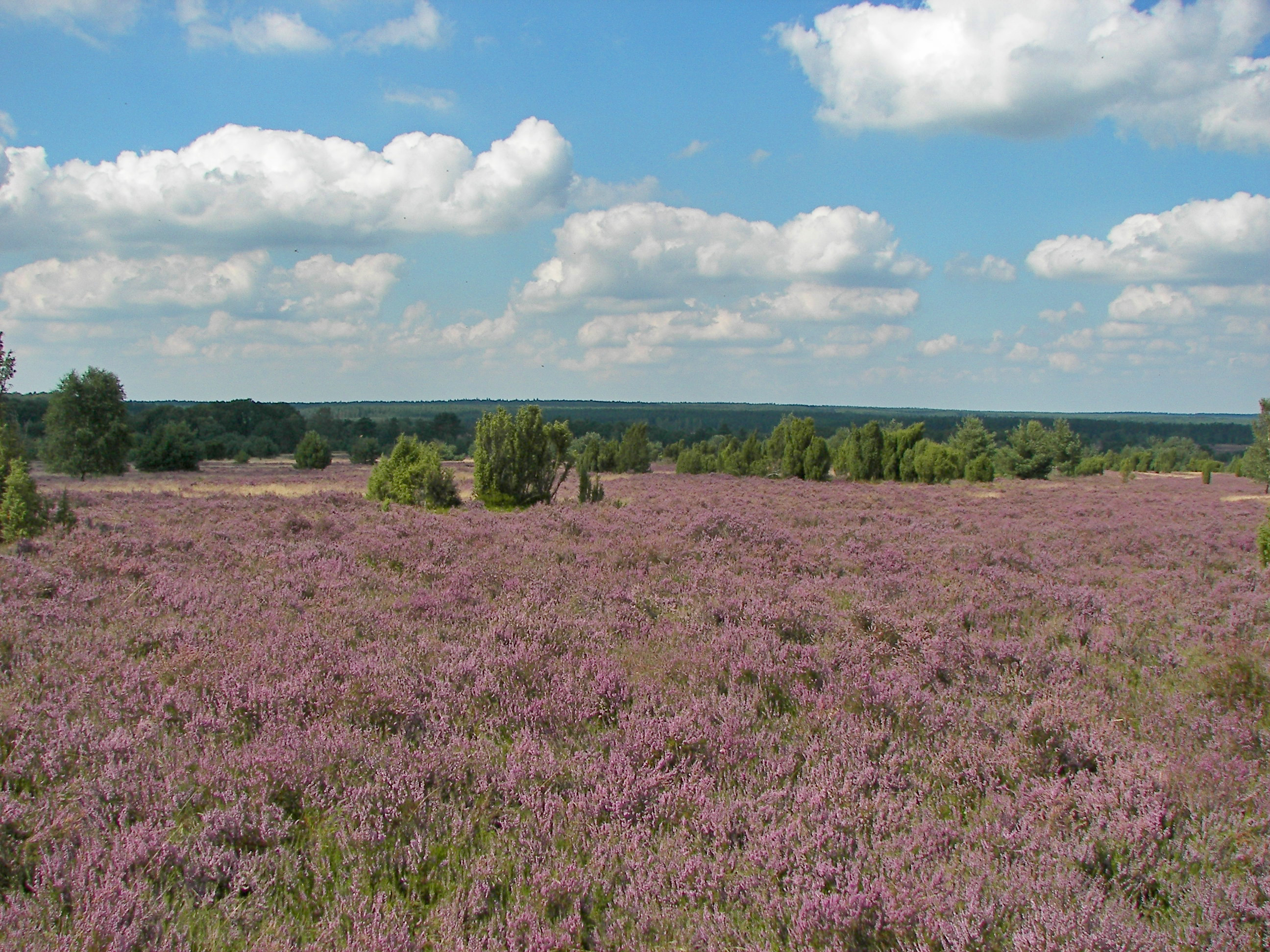
Typical sandy heath near Wilsede

Ordinary sand heath (Typische Sandheide, Genisto-Callunetum)

- In addition to the common heather (Calluna vulgaris) only a few taller plants occur here, none of which can be classed as characteristic species. Among them are the wavy hair-grass (Deschampsia flexuosa) and common juniper (Juniperus communis). Ordinary sand heath is the most widespread of the heathland types. Its proportion has increased in recent decades at the expense of other heath habitats. This reduction in the variety of heathland types may be due to increasing nitrogen levels from the air, the increase in plant litter (Rohhumusauflagen) and the natural ageing of the heathland.

Lichen-rich sand heath (Flechtenreiche Sandheide, Genisto-Callunetum cladonietosum)

- The lichen-rich sand heaths can be told apart from the other types of heathland by the presence of various cup lichens (Cladonia), ciliated fringewort (Ptilidium ciliare) and juniper haircap (Polytrichum juniperinum). They occur frequently on dry, south-facing slopes. This type of heath is found west of Niederhaverbeck and near Sundermühlen.

Clay heath (Lehmheide, Genisto-callunetum danthonietusum)

- This can be identified by the presence of heath grass (Danthonia decumbens), pill sedge (Carex pilulifera), mat grass (Nardus stricta), fine-leaved sheep's-fescue (Festuca filiformis), mouse-ear hawkweed (Hieracium pilosella) and field wood-rush (Luzula campestris). Clay heaths have become very rare within the Lüneburg Heath. They are found on the Wilseder Berg and south of Niederhaverbeck.

Blueberry sand heath (Heidelbeer-Sandheide, Genisto-Callunetum, Vaccinium myrtillus Rasse)

- Blueberries (Vaccinium myrtillus) are the signature species of this type of heath and, more rarely, cranberries (Vaccinium vitis-idaea). Blueberry heath is the second most common type of vegetation on the heathlands and occurs especially on northern slopes, the edges of woods and thick juniper hedges. This type of heath is particularly characteristic of the northern slopes of the Wilseder Berg, as well as the Steingrund and Totengrund. In those places, cranberries have even ousted the common heather (Calluna vulgaris) in places.

Wet sand heath (Feuchte Sandheide, Genisto-Callunetum, Molinia-Variante)

- Wet sand heath is the ideal habitat for purple moor grass (Molinia caerulea), cross-leaved heath (Erica tetralix) and scirpus (Scirpus cespitosus). It occurs in places close to the water table and in the transition zone around bogs. Its primary locations are areas north of Wilsede and near the Hörpel Ponds (Hörpeler Teichen).
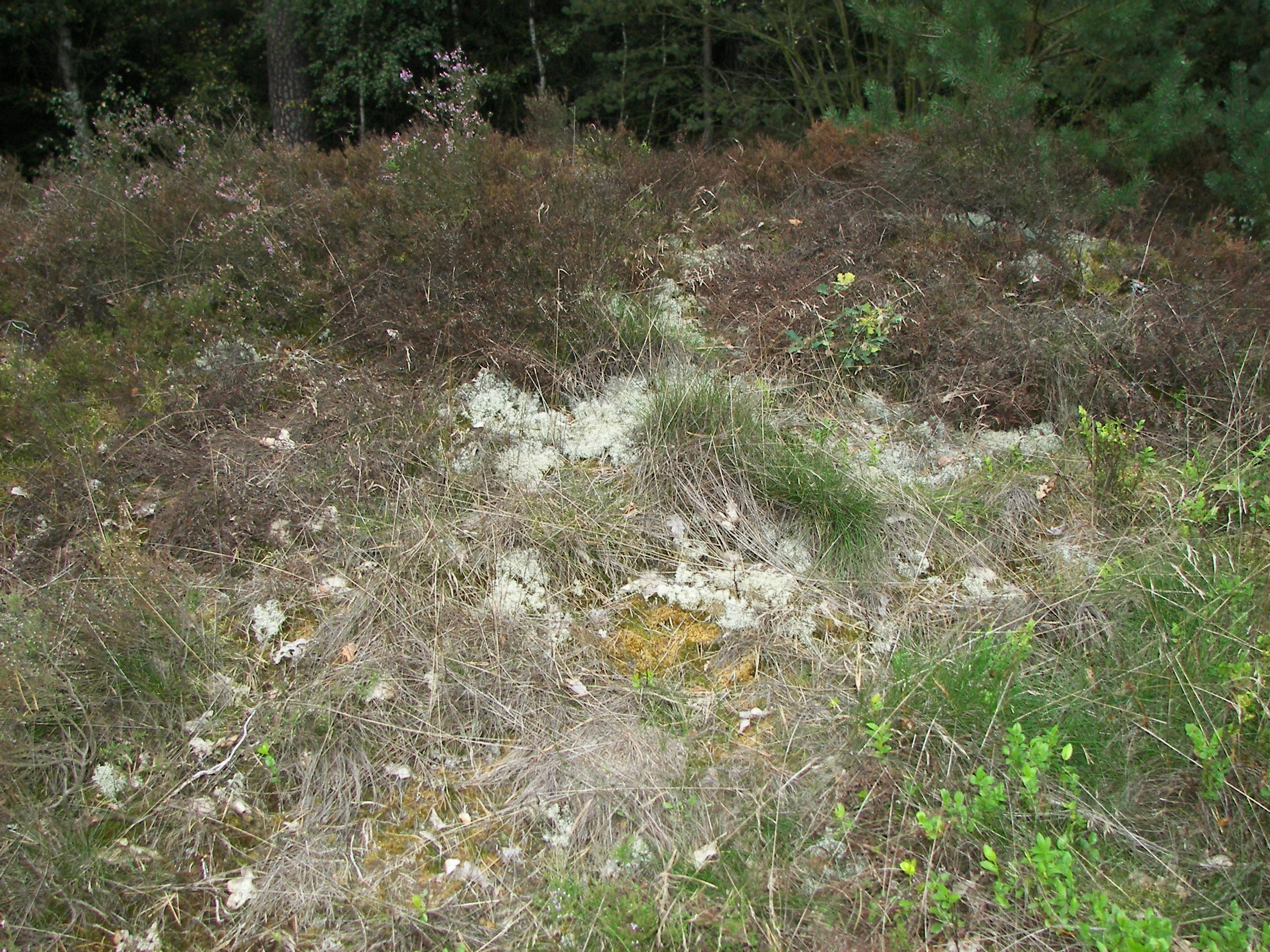
Lichen-rich sand heath north of Niederhaverbeck

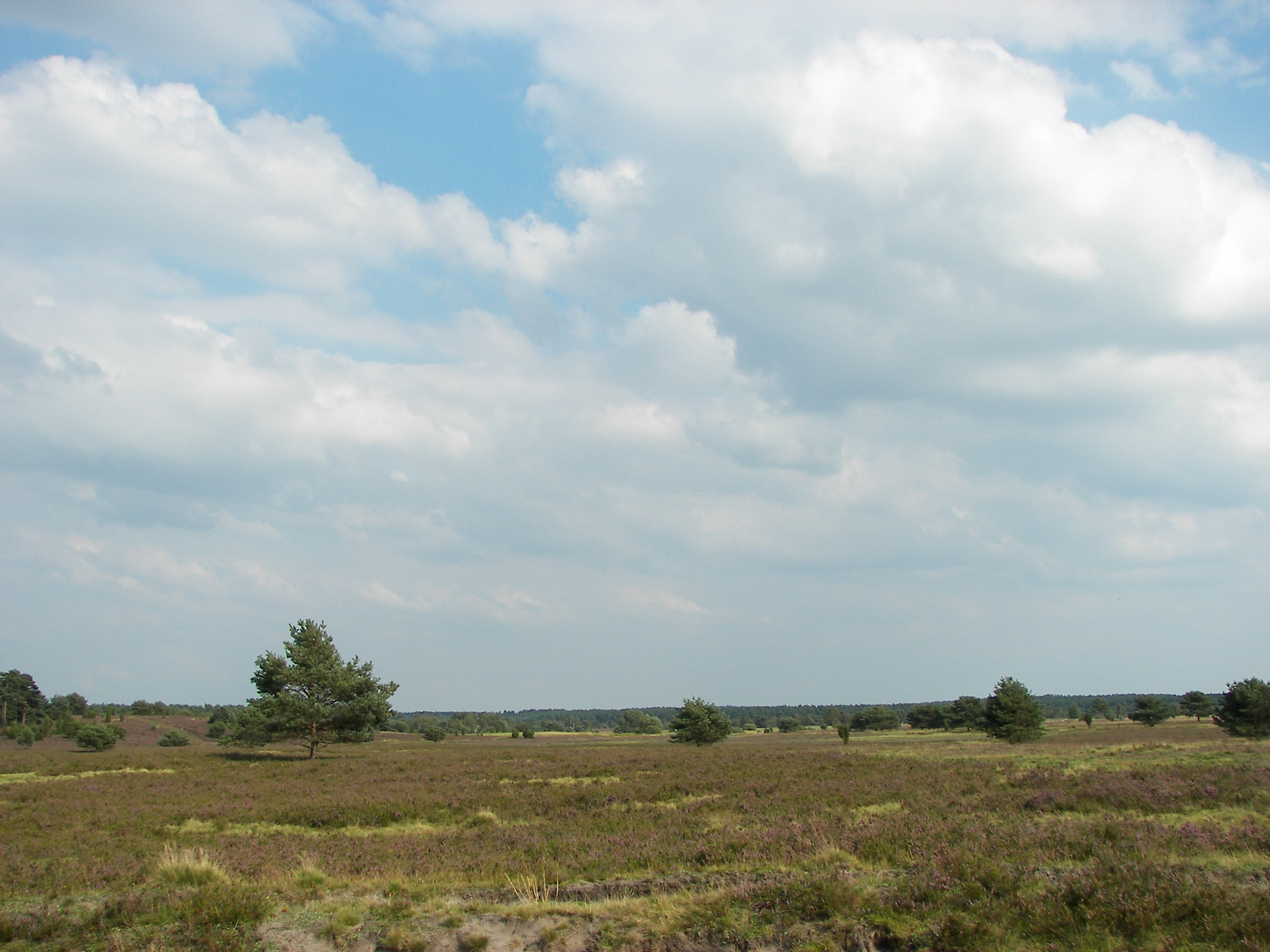
Clay heath south of Niederhaverbeck

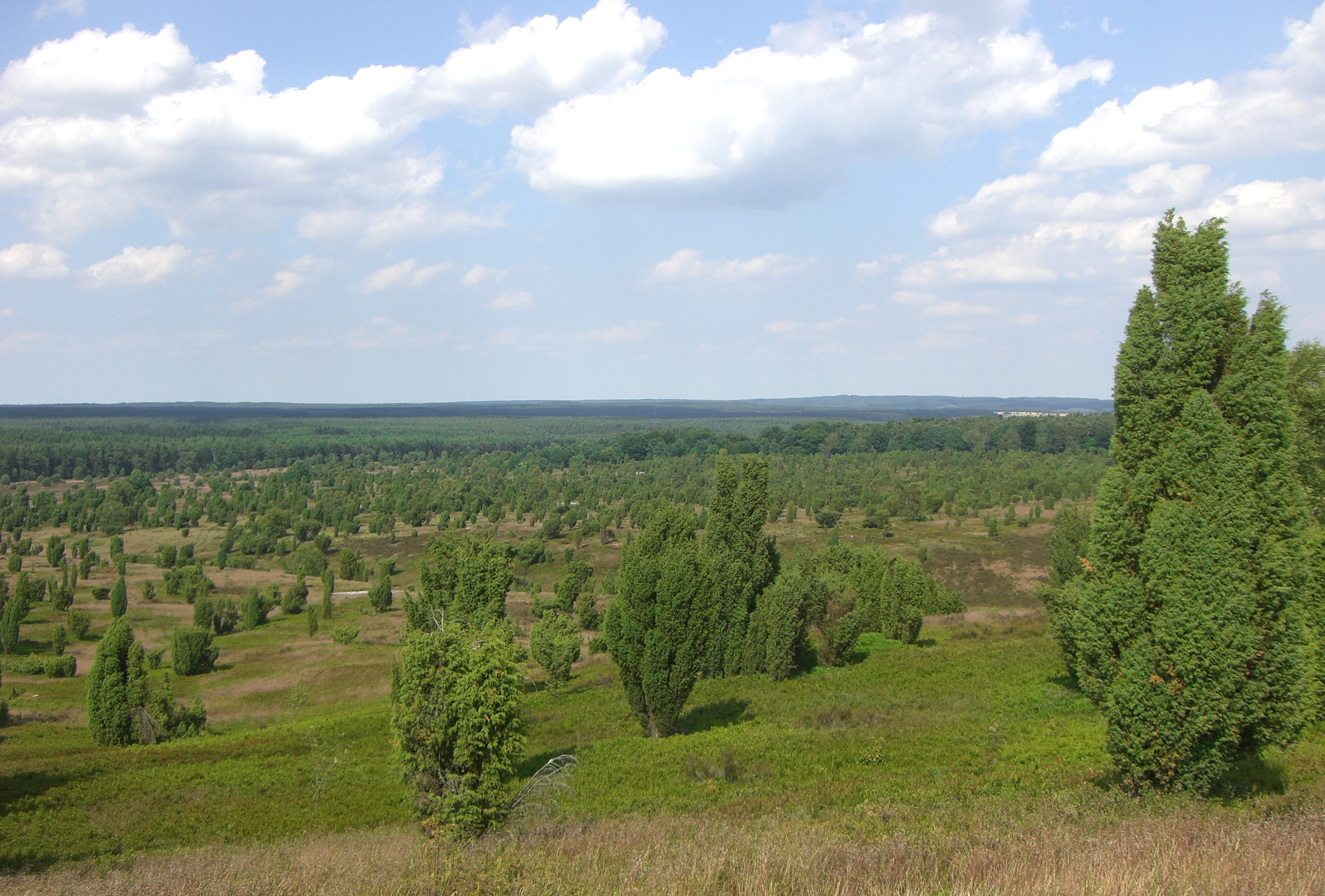
Blueberry sand heath on the northern slope of the Wilseder Berg

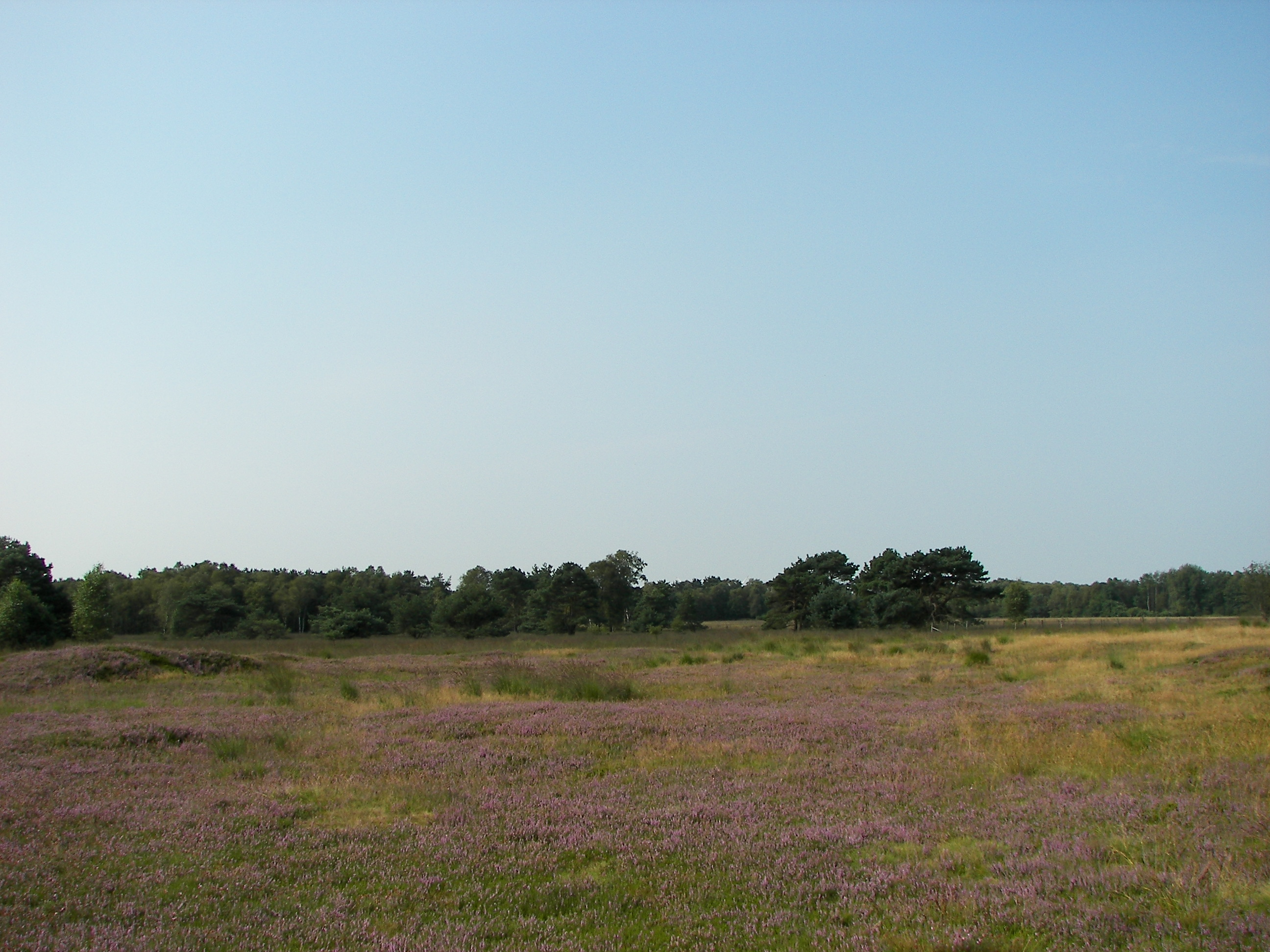
Wet sand heath near the Pietzmoor

==== Woods ====
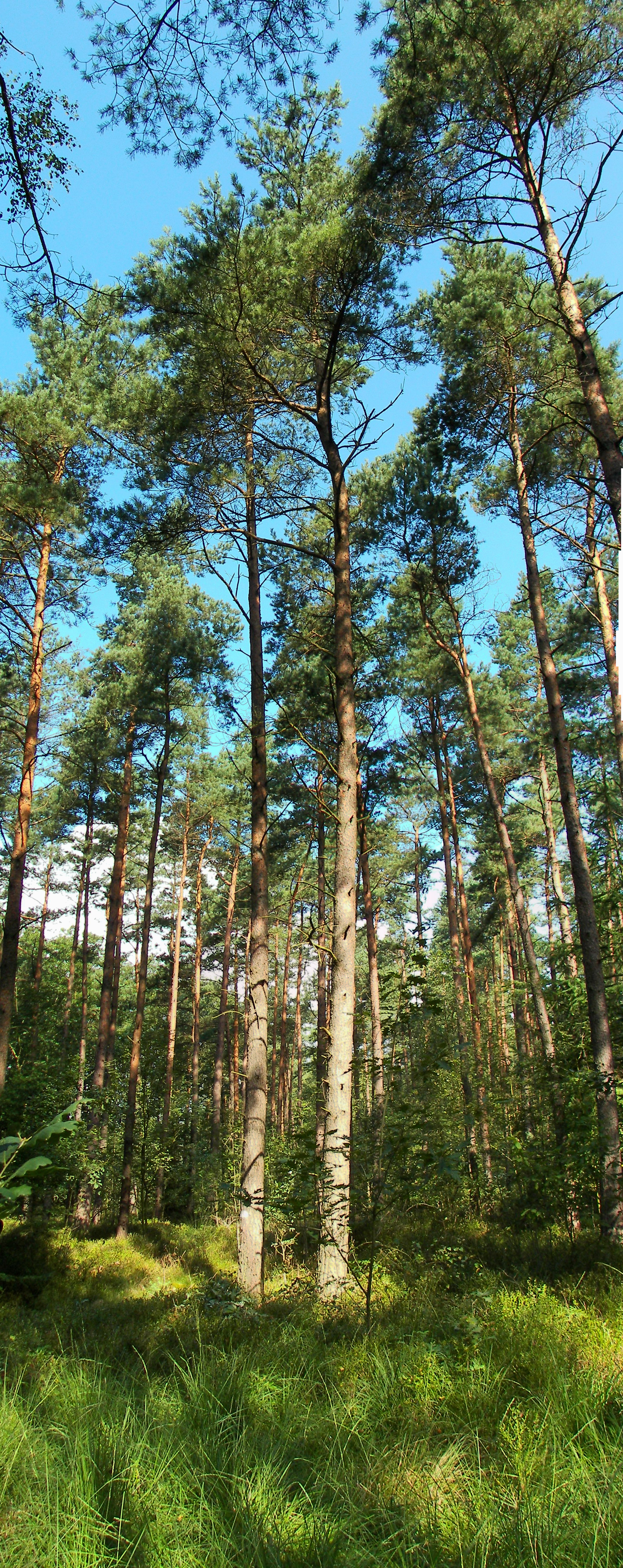
Pine forest near Schneverdingen

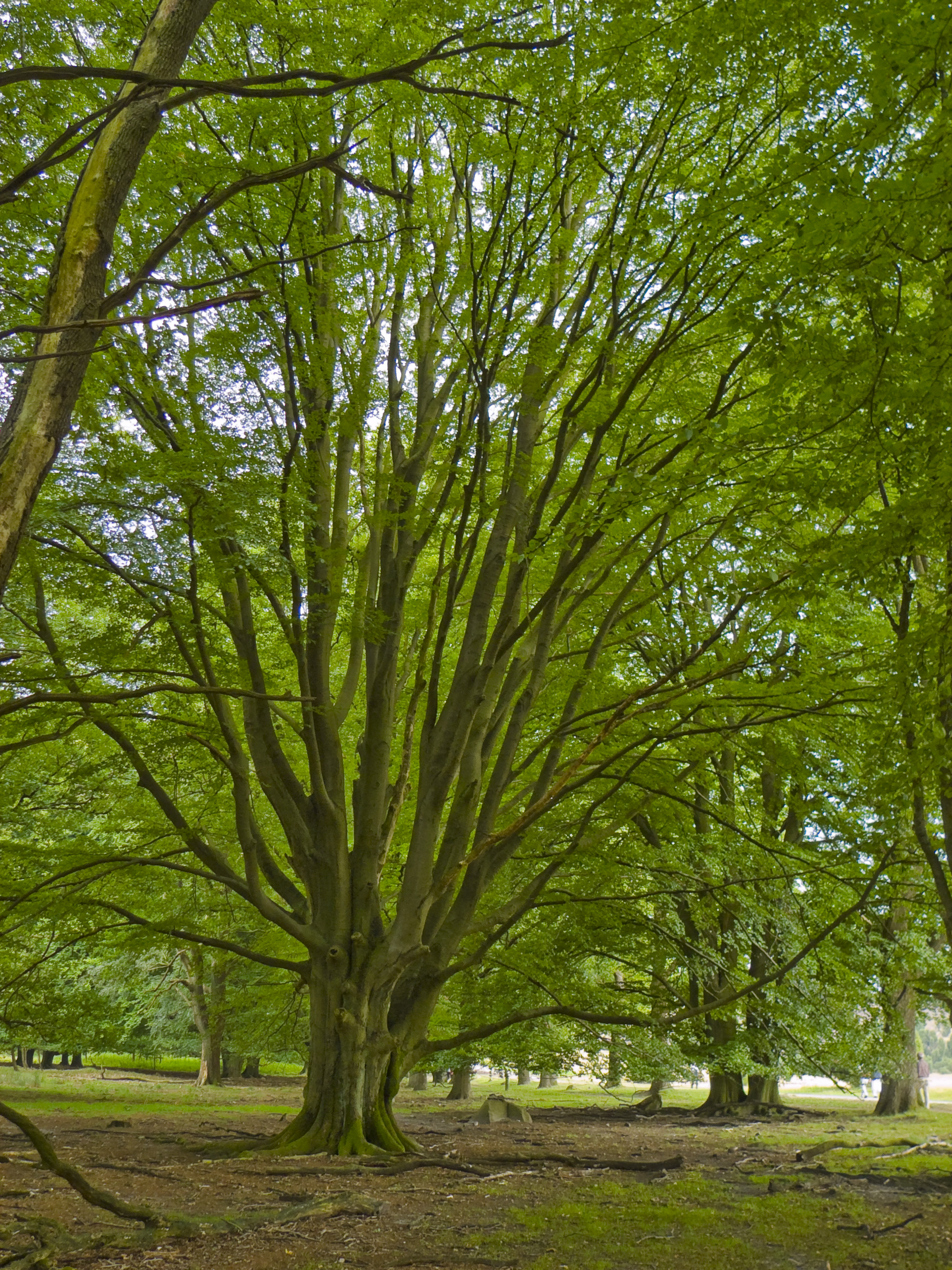
The Hutewald (wood pasture) near Wilsede

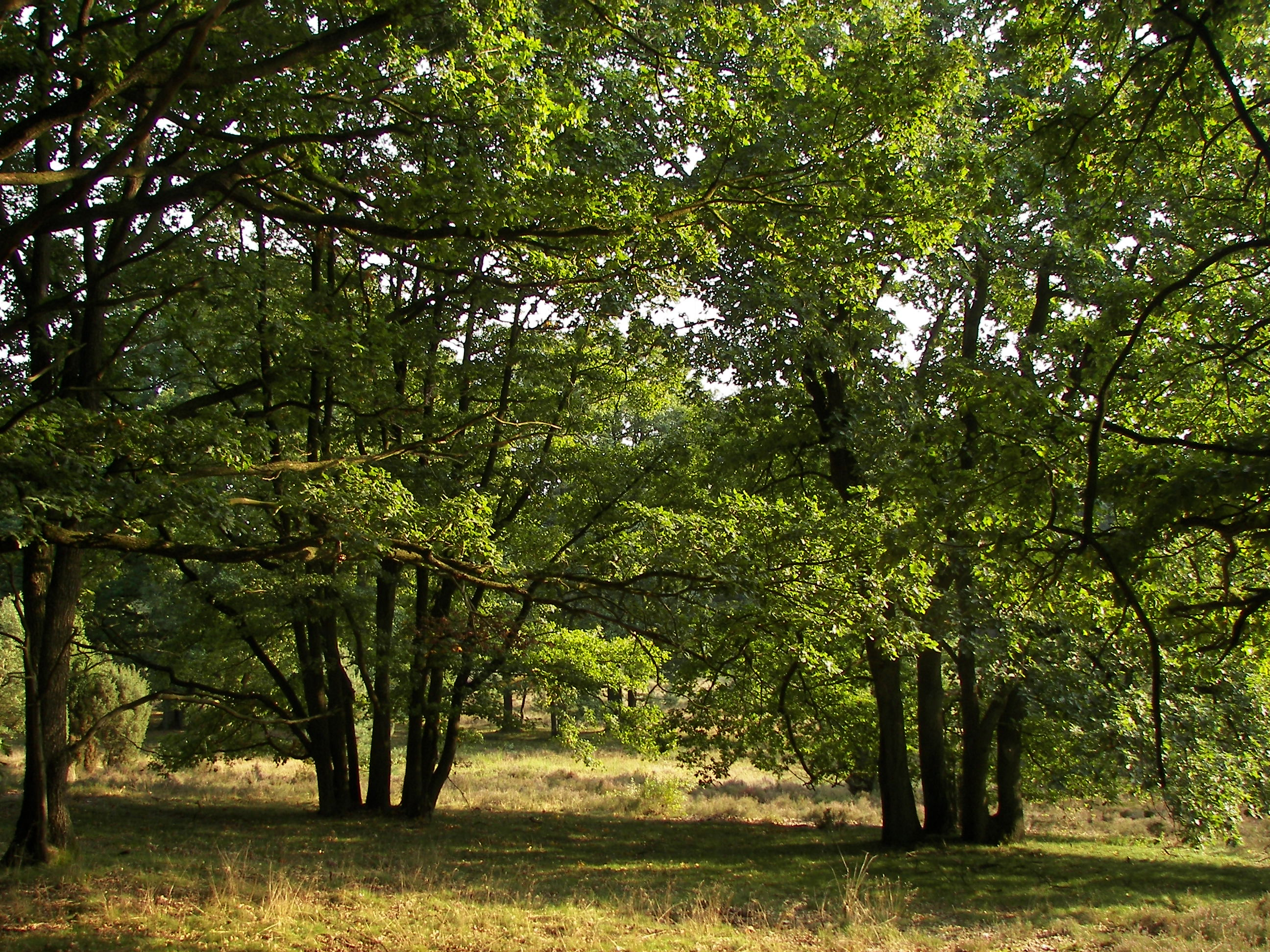
Old coppices (Stühbüsche) near Niederhaverbeck

The greater part (about 58%) of the Lüneburg Heath Nature Reserve consists of woods, primarily pine forests, which were planted in the second half of the 19th century on former heathland and drifting sand. In some cases the dunes simply became naturally overgrown, again with pines. There are only a very few old stands of sessile oaks, which stem from the logging industry during the time of the Kingdom of Hanover. In many parts of the nature reserve there are so-called Stühbüsche (a form of coppice), trees that were coppiced by repeatedly being cut short. In the meantime they have grown wild again and have a characteristic and unusual appearance with their multiple trunks. Near Wilsede there is the remnant of a Hutewald, a wood pasture with giant, multi-stemmed beech trees.

==== Bogs ====
The largest bog on Lüneburg Heath is the Pietzmoor, which lies east of Schneverdingen. It was drained however and peat was cut there until the 1960s. The Nature Park Association carried out work in the 1980s to try to turn it back to its natural waterlogged state. For example, some of the drainage ditches were filled which led to a considerable rise in the water levels of the former peat cuts. However typical bog vegetation has not yet re-established itself.

=== Animals ===
Many species of animal live on Lüneburg Heath, particularly birds that are at home in the wide, open landscape, some of which are seriously threatened by the intensive-farming techniques in other areas. These include the: black grouse (Tetrao tetrix), the nightjar (Caprimulgus europaeus), the woodlark (Lullula arborea), the great grey shrike (Lanius excubitor), the red-backed shrike (Lanius collurio), the northern wheatear (Oenanthe oenanthe), the wryneck (Jynx torquilla), the European green woodpecker (Picus viridis), the stonechat (Saxicola torquata), the Eurasian curlew (Numenius arquata), the common quail (Coturnix coturnix) and the black stork (Ciconia nigra). In the Lüneburg Heath, the population of the very rare black grouse is rising continually. In 2007, 78 were counted, 13 more than in the previous year. Since 2003, the number of grouse has doubled.

Wolves, although once extinct in the area, have returned to the Lüneburg Heath.

Numerous species including European bison, moose and brown bear which once inhabited the region may be seen in the Lüneburg Heath Wildlife Park alongside more exotic animals like snow leopards and Arctic wolves.

== Culture and history ==
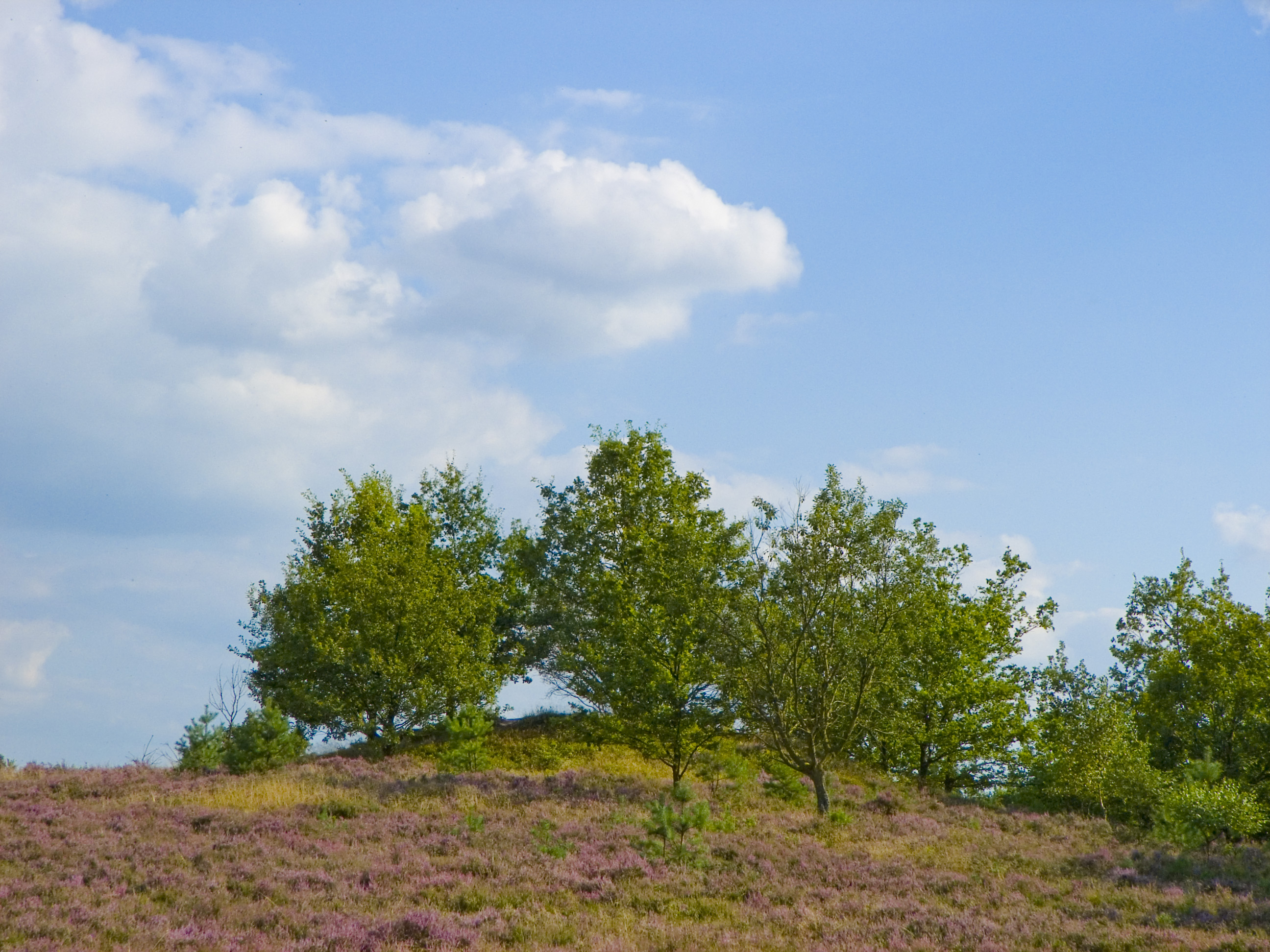
Prince's Grave (Fürstengrab) near Niederhaverbeck

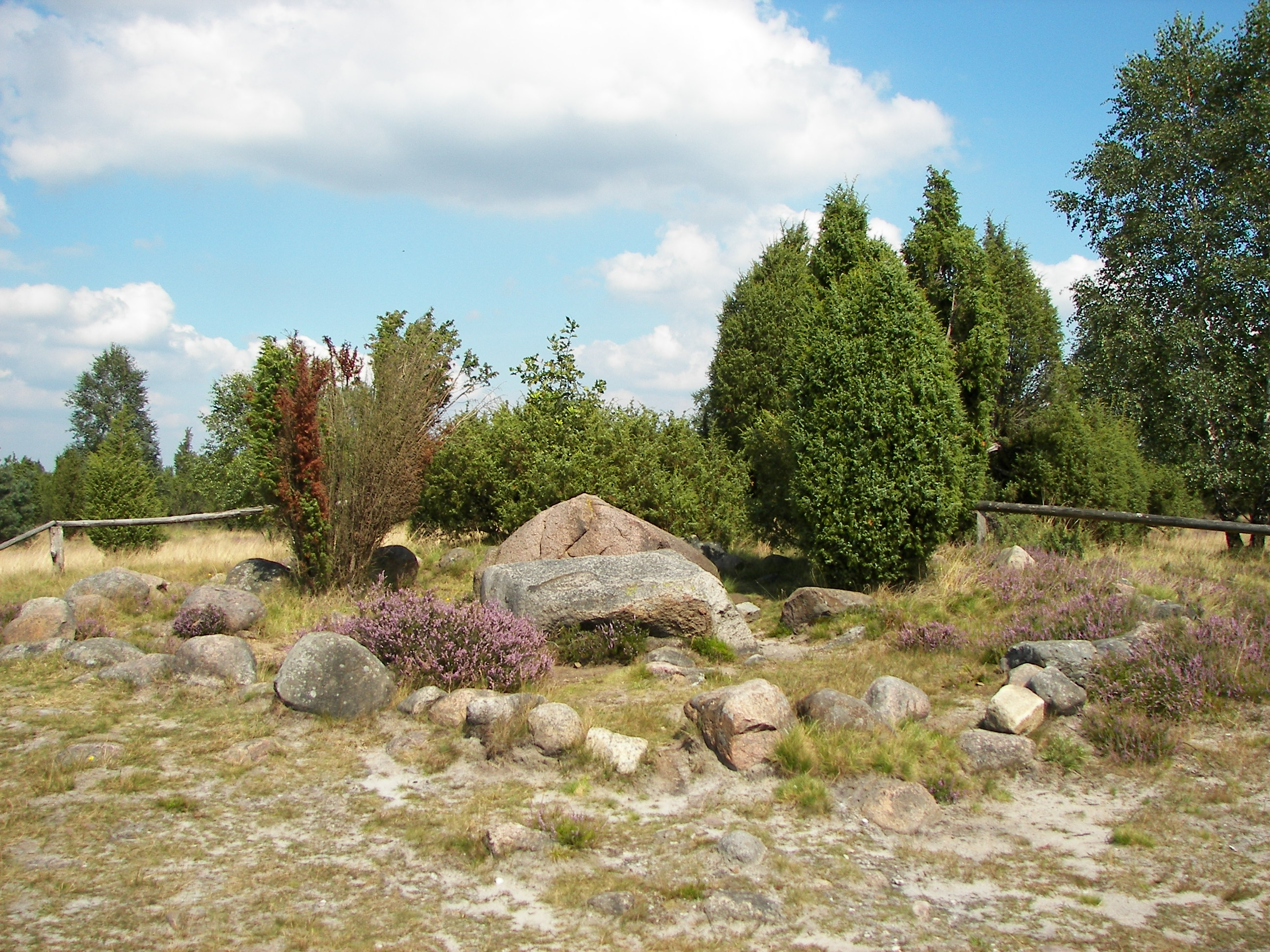
So-called Hannibal's Grave (Hannibals Grab) near Wilsede

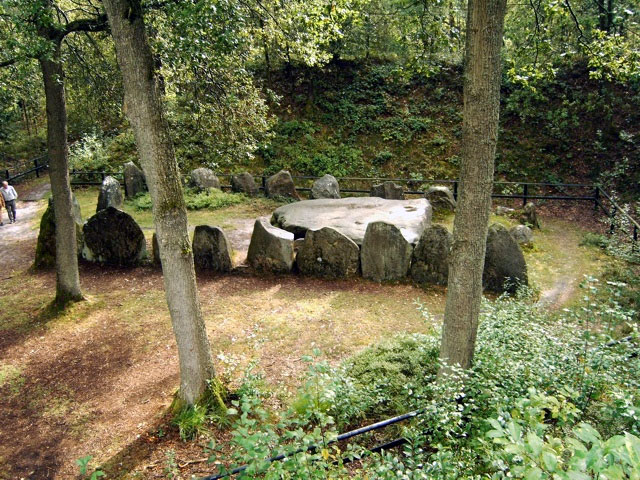
Sieben Steinhäuser, Grave D

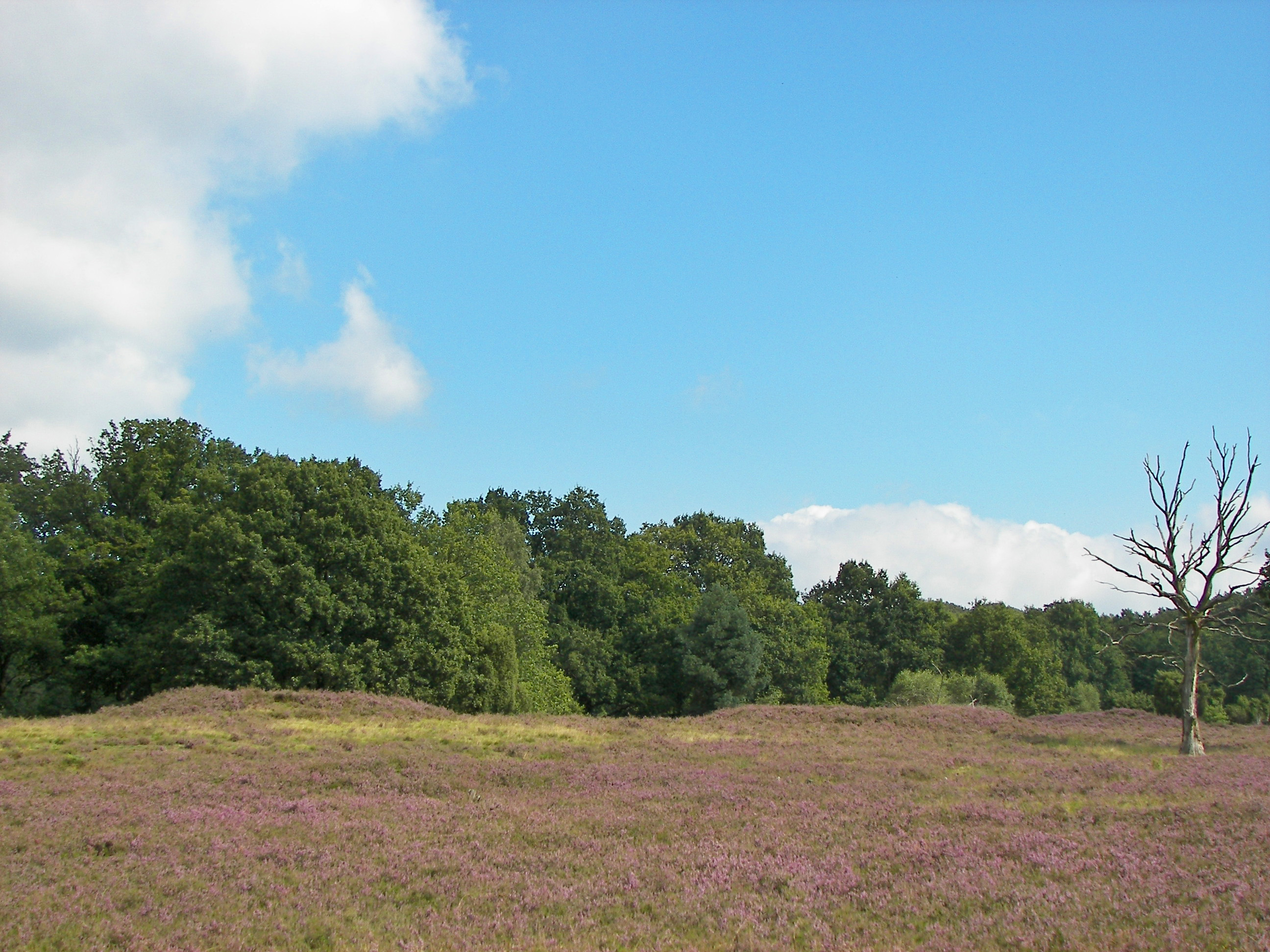
Tumuli on Lüneburg Heath

=== Early history ===
Pollen analyses show that the dry geest soils of North Germany have been cultivated since about 3000 BC. Clearance by fire and the cultivation of crops on the Pleistocene sandy soils quickly led however to soil degradation. So the land cleared by fire could only be used for a short time. The settlements moved frequently and woods elsewhere were cleared. Even at that time the first Calluna (heather) heaths appeared. Evidence of relatively dense settlement is found especially in Uelzen district. On Lüneburg Heath there are numerous Megalithic sites and tumuli from the Neolithic and the early Bronze Age. The most famous are the Oldendorfer Totenstatt (Oldendorf Grave site) and the Sieben Steinhäuser (Seven Stone Houses). But even in the Lüneburg Heath Nature Reserve there are more than a thousand tumuli, especially near Nieder- and Oberhaverbeck. The largest of these tumuli is the so-called Prince's Grave (Fürstengrab). Also near Wilsede there is the well-known stone and juniper group known as Hannibal's Grave (Hannibals Grab).

=== Transition to settlement culture ===
After the withdrawal of the Lombards in the migration period, from about 700 AD Lüneburg Heath belonged to the Duchy of Saxony, which was conquered by Charlemagne in the 9th century and became part of the Frankish Empire. The resulting close control of the population and the Christianization meant that the rural settlements had to stay in one place and could no longer move about freely. The land had to be farmed more intensively which led to the heathland spreading.

=== Settlements ===
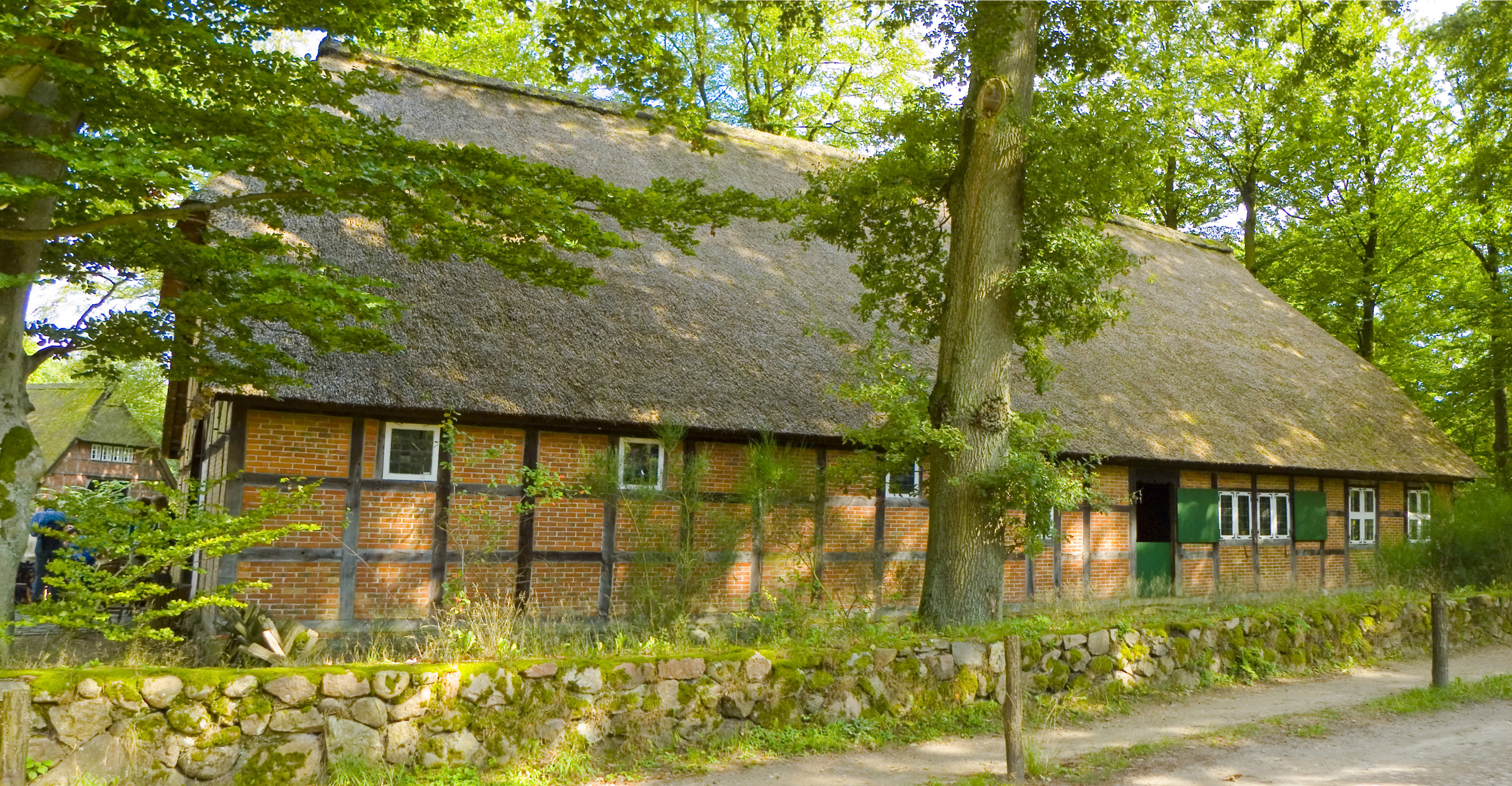
Wilsede Heath Museum – a typical timber-framed hall house (Fachhallenhaus)

Lüneburg Heath was always relatively sparsely populated due to the poor soils in the area. The region was dominated by heath farming which was a less intensive form of land usage necessary for its large areas of barren terrain and heathland. An important economic sideline of past centuries was heathland beekeeping. The villages were usually encircled by small tracts of woodland, sometimes interrupted by fields or meadows, and merged without clear boundaries into the surrounding landscape. The farmsteads were arranged relatively arbitrarily, many stood very close to one another; others were spread out at some distance from each other. They were loose cluster villages (lockere Haufendörfer). In order to prevent cattle trampling flat the gardens attached to the houses, village roads were enclosed with wooden fences and, later, with characteristic stone walls. The typical design of farmhouse was the Fachhallenhaus, a large timber-framed single building, in which people and animals lived under a single roof. Each village had relatively few complete farms; in Wilsede there were only four, in the church village (Kirchdorf) of Undeloh there were eleven, but that was an exception. In addition there were Koten (small, single houses), sheep pens and shared bakehouses. The farms themselves, however, were very large. In Wilsede all the features of a heath village described here may still be seen. Wilsede Heath Museum (Heidemuseum Wilsede) was established in a Fachhallenhaus and it gives an insight into the working and living conditions of a heathland farm around 1850. Walsrode Heath Museum was one of the first German open air museums and also portrays the life of heathland folk. In rural parts of the region they still sometimes use today a Low German dialect called Heidjerisch. This word derives from the name given to inhabitants of the Lüneburg Heath – the Heidjer.

=== Heath convents ===
In the Lüneburg Heath region, six nunneries from the Middle Ages survived, which became Protestant convents after the Reformation. These establishments are the abbeys of: Ebstorf, Isenhagen, Lüne, Medingen, Wienhausen and Walsrode.

=== The end of heathland farming in the 19th century ===
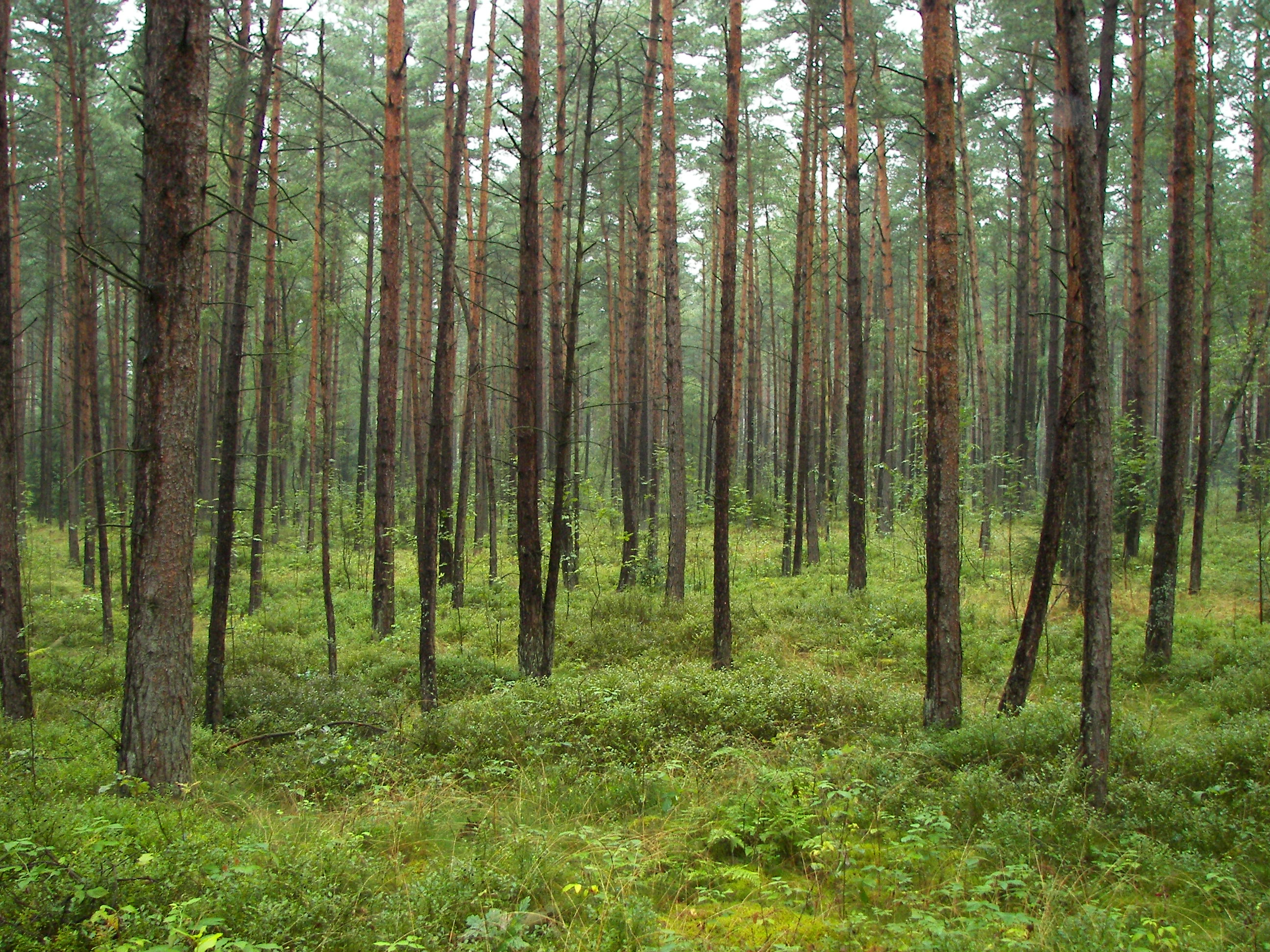
Pine forest

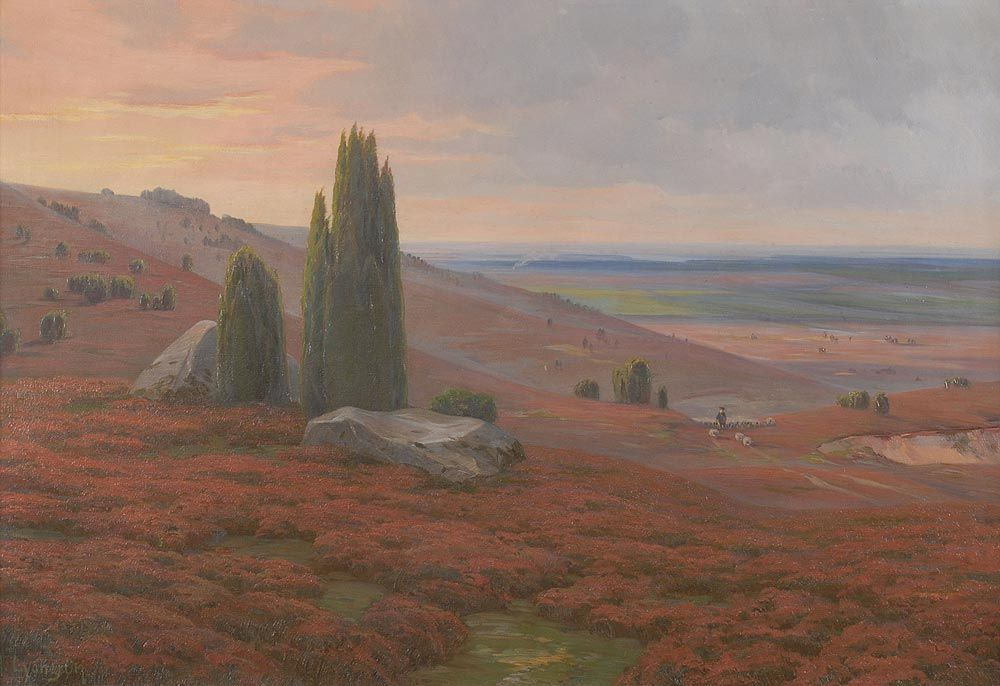
Heath Landscape, painting by Arnold Lyongrün (1912)

From 1831 feudalism was abolished in the Kingdom of Hanover and those heathland areas that were common land for the villages were divided among the individual farmers. Heathland farming died out at the end of the 19th century. Many farmers sold their land to the Prussian treasury or the Hanover monastic chamber, who afforested the land with pines. As a result, the area of heath was drastically reduced. In the late 19th century a number of farmers from the area were encouraged by British authorities to settle in the Philippi area of Cape Town, South Africa due to their knowledge of farming in barren sandy soils.

In 1800, large parts of Northwest Germany had been covered with heaths and bog. Today, by contrast the only large, continuous areas of heath remaining are in the Lüneburg Heath Nature Reserve and on a few military training areas.

=== The changing perception of the heath ===
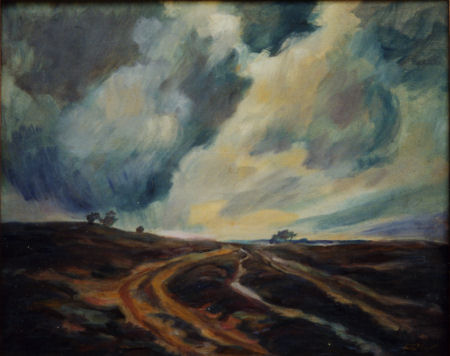
The heath in late autumn painting by Erwin Vollmer 1942

As late as the turn of the 18th to the 19th century, the barren and almost treeless heathlands were still perceived as hostile and threatening environments, as evinced by two travel logs of journeys between 1799 and 1804:

As I had traversed the Hanoverian dominions in so many directions, I did not expect to find nature clothed in charms, or a high degree of population, fertility, and cultivation. Next to Lauenburg, I think it is the worst tract of an equal extent that I ever met with. The soil is one vast sandy desert, which is either naturally bare, or covered with patches of heath or grass.

— Charles Gottlob Küttner: Travels through Denmark, Sweden, Austria and part of Italy, in 1798 & 1799. London 1805.

On leaving Zell we passed through a dark wood, of at least two leagues in extent; and from that city to Harburgh, in a line of nearly twenty German miles, we travelled over sandy plains and extensive heaths. At a great distance, geese, ducks and sheep of a very poor appearance, never failed to indicate the vicinity of some wretched hamlet. What habitations! Whole families, of the most wretched appearance, and covered with tattered garments, associate together, eat and sleep with their cattle. Near these real catacombs we observed growing a few stalks of rye and barley, and here and there a few tufu of buck-wheat. The straw is short and stunted, and the ears of a diminutive size. Population and agriculture must ever be dependant on each other.

— Michel Ange Mangourit: Travels in Hanover, during the years 1803 and 1804. London 1806.

The poem Der Heideknabe ("The Heath Lad") from the year 1844 by Friedrich Hebbel stresses the unearthly atmosphere and the bleak solitude of the heaths:

:(...) Out, out of the town! And there it stretches,

The heath, misty, ghostly,
The wind swishing over it,
Oh, every step here is like a thousand others!

And all so still, and all so quiet,
You look around for signs of life,
Only hungry birds dart by
Out of the clouds, to spear worms (...).

Towards the middle of the 19th century the first positive descriptions of the heath emerged, initially inspired by the romantic movement. With the Industrial Revolution in Germany, unspoilt nature became more important for people, providing a welcome contrast with the rapidly burgeoning cities. Because the heathlands of North Germany were being increasingly decimated by cultivation and reforestation, they now appeared to be worth protecting. Numerous writers and painters portrayed the beauty of the heath, particularly when it was in bloom in August and September. One important heathland artist was Eugen Bracht. The most famous heath poet was the local writer Hermann Löns (1866–1914), who spent some time living in a hunting lodge near Westenholz. He worked the heath countryside into his books and promoted the foundation of the first German nature reserve on Lüneburg Heath. His purported remains were buried in a juniper copse at Tietlingen near Walsrode in 1935. His works were a source for Heimatfilme that were shot on Lüneburg Heath, such as Grün ist die Heide ("The Heath Is Green") from 1932 and remade in 1951 and 1972, as well as Rot ist die Liebe ("Red is Love") from 1956.

=== History of conservation on Lüneburg Heath ===
Around 1900, there were growing demands to save the heathland and bogs of northwest Germany, which were threatened by reforestation and drainage. On Lüneburg Heath, Wilhelm Bode, then the pastor at Egestorf, was particularly active in pressing for the preservation of the endangered countryside. He had learned in 1905 of plans for building weekend houses on the Totengrund. In order to prevent this, he persuaded Andreas Thomsen, a professor from Münster, to acquire the area as a nature reserve. In 1909, Pastor Bode and district administrator (Landrat) Fritz Ecker prevented the planned reforestation of the Wilseder Berg.

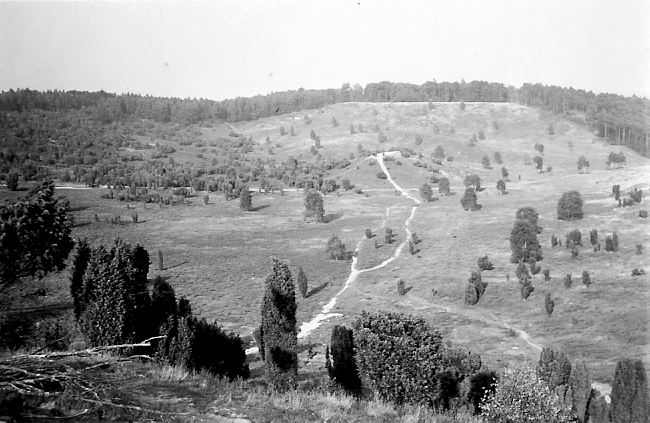
Totengrund around 1960

In the same year, an appeal by Curt Floerike appeared in Kosmos magazine, citing the establishment of national parks in the United States and calling for them in Germany. In order to realise this goal, the Nature Park Society or Verein Naturschutzpark (VNP) was founded in Munich on 23 October 1909. They planned to create national parks in the Alps, the Central Uplands and in the north German geest region. By 1913, the society had 13,000 members.

The area of Lüneburg Heath near Wilsede was selected as the location for the north German national park. Using the VNP's funds, more than 30 km^{2} of heathland were purchased or rented by 1913. In 1921, a police ordinance placed more than 200 km^{2} of Lüneburg Heath under protection, the first time this had been achieved in Germany. One problem that arose as early as the 1920s was the steadily increasing number of visitors. In 1924, in order to keep visitors away from sensitive areas of heathland, a volunteer Heath Guard (Heidewacht) was founded.

The Reich conservation law was passed in 1933 and Lüneburg Heath was designated as an official nature reserve. Although plans to build a motorway through the park and for the heath to be used as a military training area were stopped, in 1933 the Heidewacht was disbanded, mainly because it was made up of members of social democratic youth organisations. In 1939, a new law that granted the chairman of the VNP – now called Führer – wide-ranging powers. Jews could no longer be members of the society.

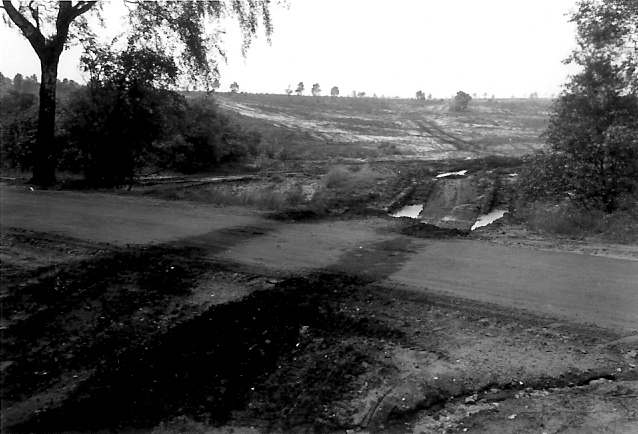
Tank tracks near Wilsede

Between 1891 and the Second World War, large military training areas were established on Lüneburg Heath, including the largest one in Europe, the Bergen-Hohne Training Area on the Südheide. Here the heathland has largely been preserved, albeit no longer accessible to the general public.

A large area of the nature park belonging to the society near Schneverdingen was taken over by the British Army of the Rhine in 1945 for use as a tank training area. In the 1950s, during military exercises, British tanks even pushed forward as far as the Wilseder Berg. Not until the Soltau-Lüneburg Agreement, was signed in 1959 between the Federal Republic of Germany, the United Kingdom and Canada, were the boundaries of the tank training area fixed. Continual exercising over the area by armoured vehicles completely destroyed the vegetation on the Osterheide near Schneverdingen, forming large areas of sand dunes. In 1994, the British returned the so-called "Red Areas" of the Soltau-Lüneburg Training Area to the Nature Park Society who, with the help of money from the federal government, set about the work of renaturation. Nowadays hardly any traces of the tank training area are left. The base camp for military exercises, Reinsehlen Camp, has been turned into a nature reserve.

=== Forest fire ===
In August 1975, fire broke out on the Südheide which turned out to be the biggest forest fire in West Germany to that date. Serious forest fires broke out in the southern part of the area near Stüde, Neudorf-Platendorf, Meinersen and then by Eschede near Celle, with devastating effects and fatalities.

== German surrender at the end of the Second World War ==
On 4 May 1945, the heath was the scene of the unconditional surrender to the Allies, under Field Marshal Bernard Montgomery, of German forces in the Netherlands, north-west Germany, including all islands, Denmark, and all naval ships in those areas, at the end of World War II in Europe. It is also the area where the body of Heinrich Himmler, head of the SS in Nazi Germany, was secretly buried in an unmarked grave, following his suicide after capture.

== Transport ==
=== Road ===
Three motorways (Autobahnen) run across Lüneburg Heath, the A 7, A 27 and A 250, as well as various federal roads, the B 3, B 71, B 440 and others.

=== Railways ===
Lüneburg Heath is served by the following railway lines:

- The Hanover-Hamburg railway: Hamburg-Lüneburg-Uelzen-Celle-Hanover
- The Rollbahn: Hamburg-Buchholz in der Nordheide-Rotenburg (Wümme)-Bremen
- The Heath Railway (Heidebahn): (Hamburg)-Buchholz in der Nordheide-Soltau-Bad Fallingbostel-Walsrode-Bennemühlen–Hanover
- The Uelzen-Langwedel railway: Bremen-Visselhövede-Soltau-Munster-Uelzen
- The Brunswick-Uelzen railway: Uelzen-Wieren-Wittingen-Gifhorn-Braunschweig
- The East Hanoverian Railways (Osthannoversche Eisenbahnen or OHE) maintains a railway network, the greater part of which lies in the Lüneburg Heath (only for goods and museum services) and sometimes the Heath Express (Heide-Express).

== See also ==
- Lüneburg Heath Nature Park
- Lüneburg Heath Nature Reserve
- Ahlden House
- Auf der Lüneburger Heide (song)
- Terminal moraine
- List of glacial moraines
