= Erwin Vollmer =

German painter and sculptor

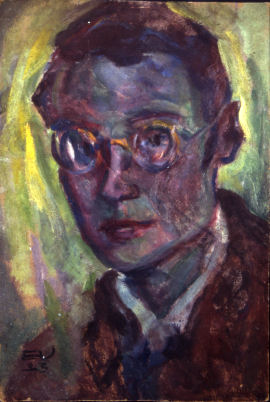
Self-portrait, 1923

Erwin Vollmer (19 October 1884 in Berlin – 27 June 1973 in Rehlingen) was a German painter and sculptor.

== Life and Work ==
Vollmer comes from a North-German family of artists. His grand-father was the Hamburg landscape and marine painter Adolph Friedrich Vollmer (1806–1875). His father, Johannes Vollmer (1845-1920), was a prominent architect of Protestant churches; his older brother Hans Vollmer was an art historian and encyclopedist; from 1923 until retirement in 1962 he worked as principal editor of the Thieme-Becker-Vollmer Künstler Lexikon.

Vollmer began his studies under the Berlin landscape painter Paul Vorgang , then continued his studies with Ludwig von Hofmann at the Grand-Ducal Saxon Art School, Weimar 1904 - 1908. Vollmer found in the barren Lüneburg Heath a landscape akin to his own nature. He settled in the village of Rehlingen, then still a hamlet surrounded by extensive heath; there he lived all his life. Study trips took him to Finland in 1928, to the Rega river in Pomerania in 1935, and repeatedly to his painter friends Otto Illies in the Harz Mountains and to Willy Preetorius in Kreuth on Lake Tegernsee. He gradually over years lost his eyesight but continued painting until his death.

As sculptor Vollmer is self-taught. The small sculptures – nudes and animals – are executed in terracotta and bronze.

Works of his are in the collections of the Albert-König-Museum Unterlüß, the Museum für das Fürstentum Lüneburg and the Stadtarchiv Lüneburg among others.

Selected paintings

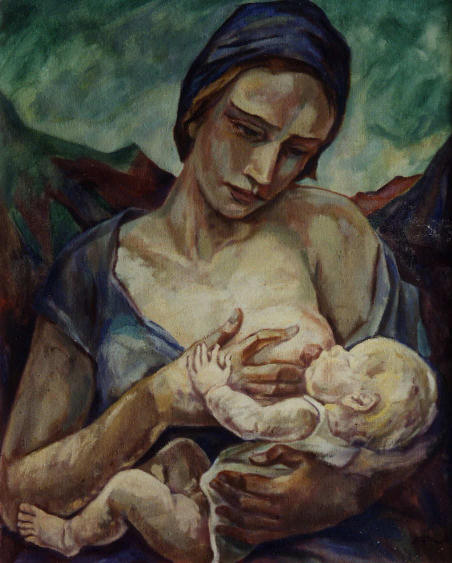
Young Mother 1930

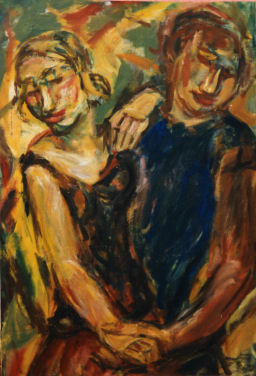
Dance 1962

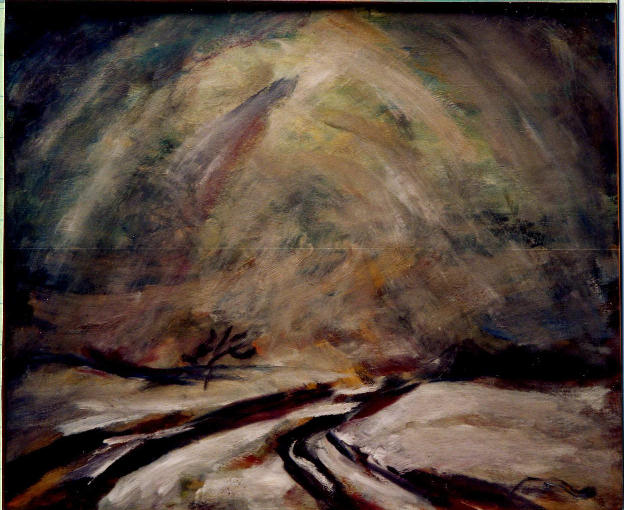
Winter-night 1955

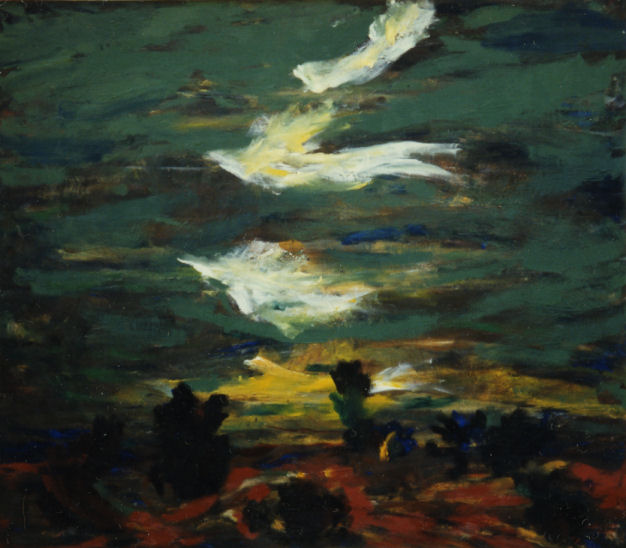
Heath 1968

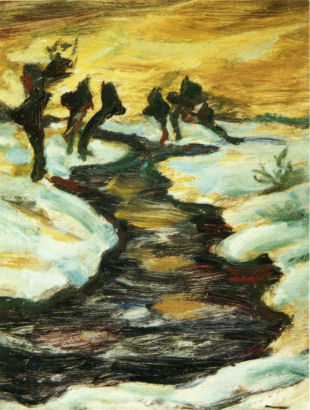
Brook in winter 1948

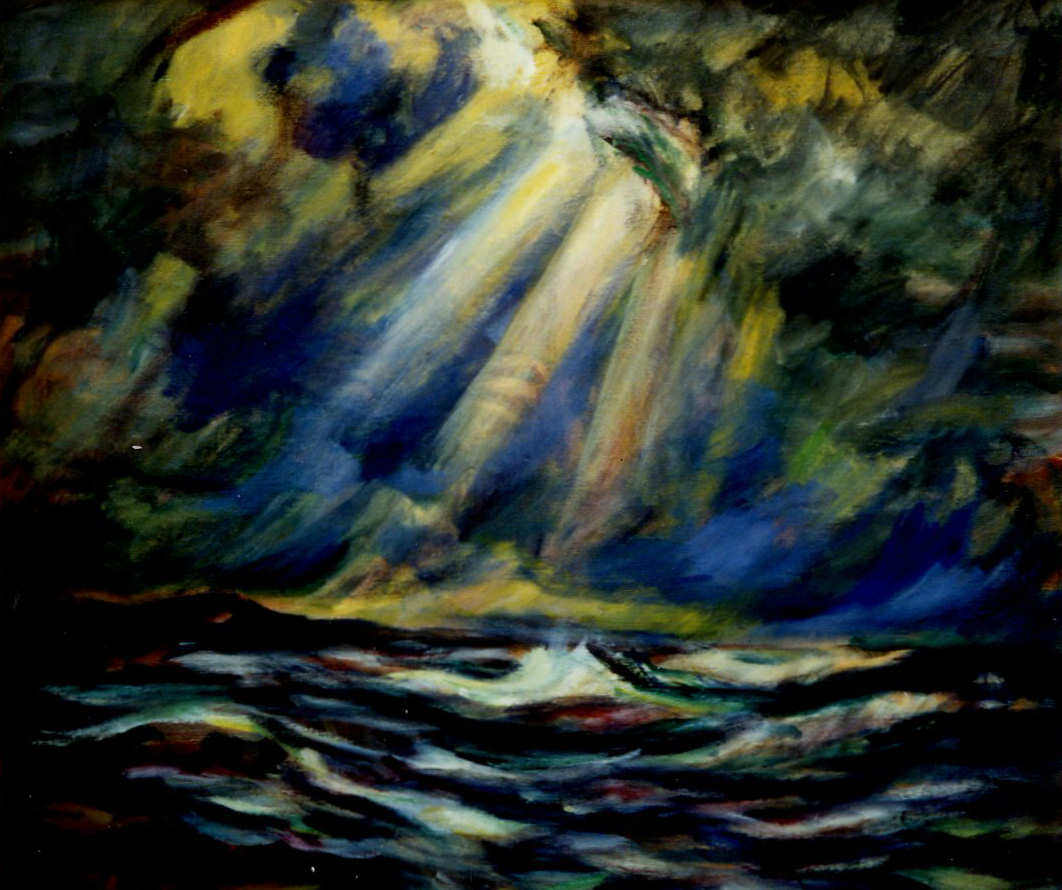
The day of Creation 1946
