= Amelinghausen (Samtgemeinde) =

- Samtgemeinde
- Coat of arms

- Location of Amelinghausen within Lüneburg district
- Interactive map of Amelinghausen
- Location within Germany Location within Lower Saxony
- Coordinates: 53°07′31″N 10°12′47″E
- Country: Germany
- State: Lower Saxony
- District: Lüneburg
- Subdivisions: 5 municipalities

Government
  - Mayor (2021–26): Christoph Palesch (SPD)

Area
  - Total: 194.48 km^{2} (75.09 sq mi)
- Elevation: 66 m (217 ft)

Population (2025-12-31)
  - Total: 7,972
  - Density: 40.99/km^{2} (106.2/sq mi)
- Time zone: UTC+01:00 (CET)
  - Summer (DST): UTC+02:00 (CEST)
- Postal codes: 21385
- Dialling codes: 04132
- Vehicle registration: LG
- Website: www.samtgemeinde-amelinghausen.de

Amelinghausen is a Samtgemeinde ("collective municipality") in the district of Lüneburg, in Lower Saxony, Germany. Its seat is the village of Amelinghausen.

The Samtgemeinde Amelinghausen consists of the following municipalities:

- Amelinghausen
- Betzendorf
- Oldendorf (Luhe)
- Rehlingen
- Soderstorf

== Waterbodies ==
The Lopausee lies on the parish boundary of Amelinghausen on the upper reaches of the Lopau. This artificial lake has an area of about 12 ha and is a popular destination in the Lüneburg Heath. It was laid out in the 1970s as part of projects to improve the landscape.
