= Ehlbeck =

River in Germany

Location
- Country: Germany
- State: Lower Saxony

Physical characteristics
- Mouth
  - location: Lopau
  - coordinates: 53.0919°N 10.2036°E
- Length: 9.2 km (5.7 mi)

Basin features
- Progression: Lopau→ Luhe→ Ilmenau→ Elbe→ North Sea

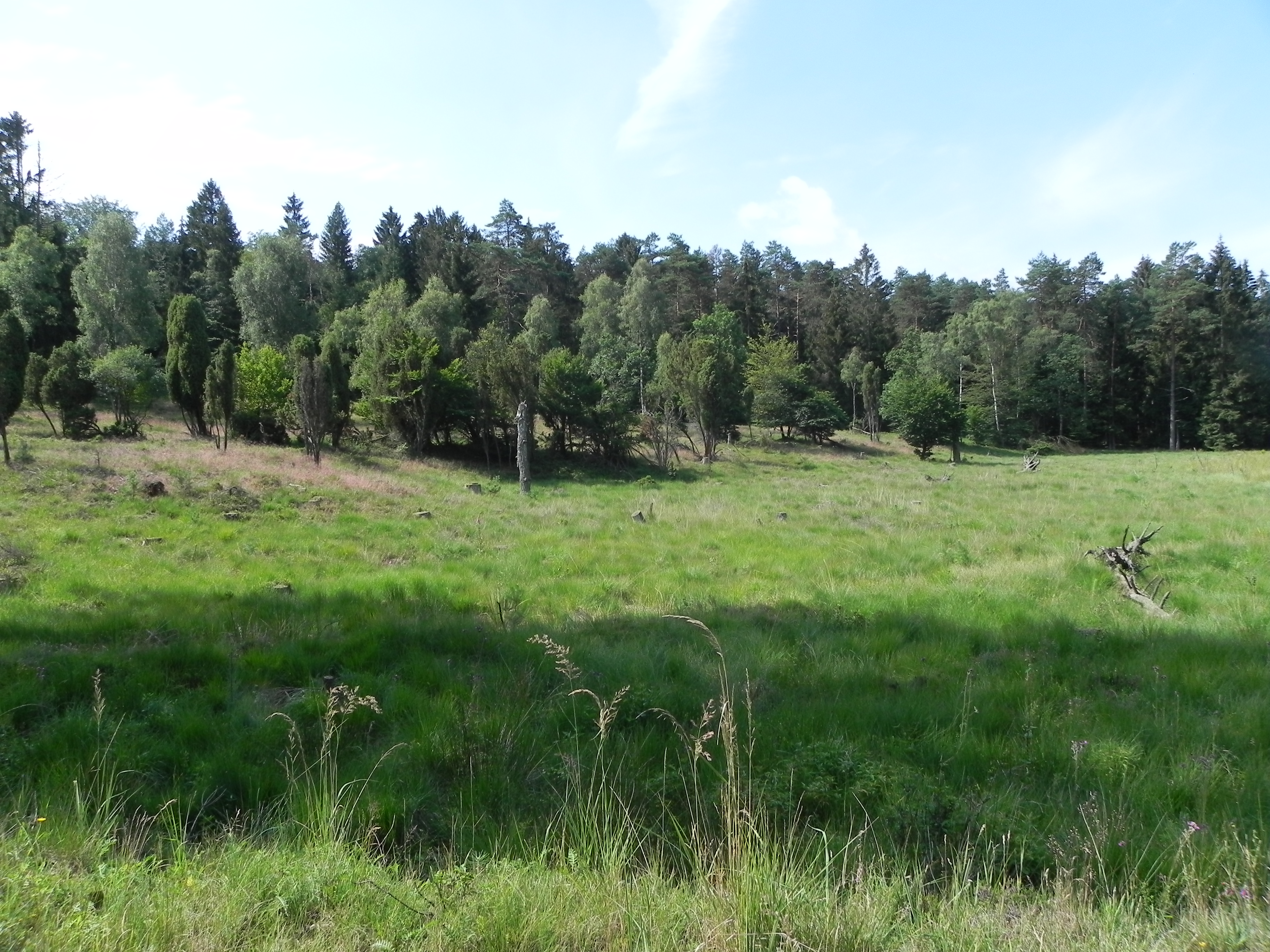
Headwaters of the Ehlbeck (Lopau) on the Munster Nord military training area

Ehlbeck is a small river of Lower Saxony, Germany. It flows into the Lopau near Rehlingen.

== See also ==
- List of rivers of Lower Saxony
