= Amelinghausen =

- Municipality
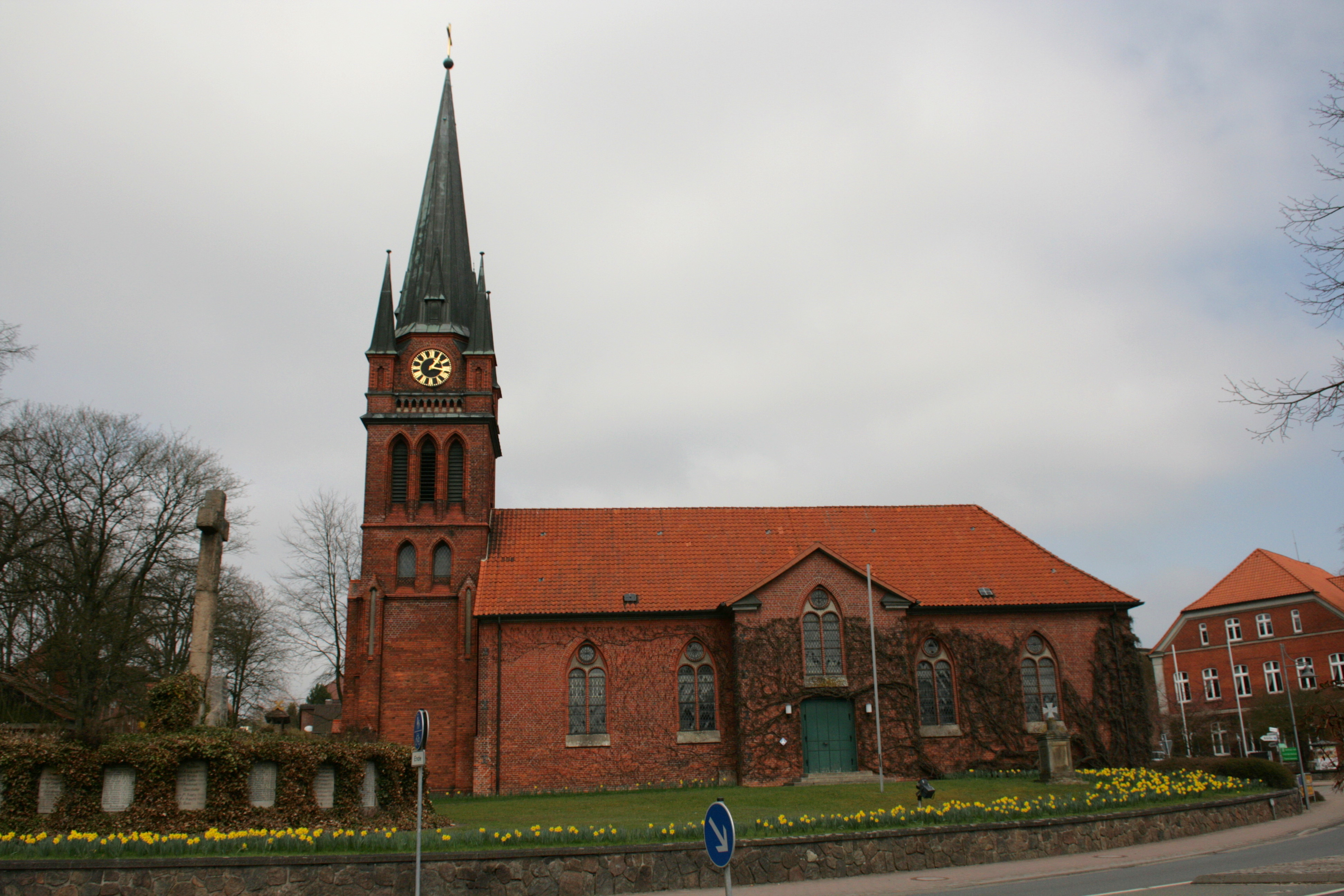
- Lutheran church of Saint Hippolytus

- Coat of arms

- Location of Amelinghausen within Lüneburg district
- Interactive map of Amelinghausen
- Location within Germany Location within Lower Saxony
- Coordinates: 53°07′36″N 10°12′53″E
- Country: Germany
- State: Lower Saxony
- District: Lüneburg
- Municipal assoc.: Amelinghausen

Area
  - Total: 27.26 km^{2} (10.53 sq mi)
- Elevation: 62 m (203 ft)

Population (2025-12-31)
  - Total: 3,803
  - Density: 139.5/km^{2} (361.3/sq mi)
- Time zone: UTC+01:00 (CET)
  - Summer (DST): UTC+02:00 (CEST)
- Postal codes: 21385
- Dialling codes: 04132
- Vehicle registration: LG
- Website: www.amelinghausen.de

Amelinghausen is a municipality in the district of Lüneburg in Lower Saxony, Germany. It is also the seat of the collective municipality (Samtgemeinde) of Amelinghausen.

== Geography ==
The municipality lies in the middle of the Lüneburg Heath Nature Park. East of Amelinghausen, the upper reaches of the River Lopau are impounded to form the Lopausee, a lake used for tourism.

== Municipal divisions ==
The villages in the municipality are:

- Amelinghausen
- Dehnsen
- Etzen

== History ==
The village of Amelinghausen was first mentioned in the records on 22 May 1293. The beginnings of settlement began, however, in the New Stone Age. The first people in this region were migrant hunters and gatherers around 15,000 B. C. They followed reindeer herds coming from the west, for which this area, the present-day Lüneburg Heath, offered a new habitat thanks to its more moderate climate (having hitherto being the Ice Age).

Thousands of years later, about 3,700 B. C., the first humans settled here. The first settlers of the region established themselves on the banks of the River Luhe. As a result of communication with the folk to the south they had already acquired a knowledge of farming. Surviving grave sites are witnesses to the permanent settlement of the present-day Lüneburg Heath from the New Bronze AGe (1100–800 B. C.), through the Early Iron Age (600–800 B. C.) and the Pre-Roman Iron Age (600 B. C. – birth of Christ), into the Migration Period (2nd–6th century A. D.).

One of the best-known grave sites, that like almost all of them dates to the New Stone Age, lies in a small area of restored heathland and is known today as the Oldendorfer Totenstatt. Here several of the different types of grave are located together(tumuli, Urnfield gravesites and dolmens) and may still be viewed today.

The name of the village is derived from Bishop Amelung of Verden. Amelung was supposed to have venerated Hippolytus of Rome and named the church after him. According to research into the origins of placenames, the ending -hausen indicates it is one of the more recent settlements (after 800 A. D.) in the Bardengau, because placename endings like -burg, -hagen, -ingen, -rode or even -husen (-hausen) first appeared during the Frankish period.

The estates of the bishop, including the so-called Junkernhof farm, did not return after his death in 962 to the Bishopric of Verden, but were incorporated by his brother, Hermann Billung, (died 973), which later led to the imposition of an excommunication order on him.

Amelinghausen was an advocacy or Vogtei that included 16 villages, and which was subordinated to the Großvogtei (great vogtei) of Winsen an der Luhe. Hitherto it had had a court (Gerichtsstätte) with its own jurisdiction that included a forest land court (Holzmarkengericht).

From 1603 to 1616 a relative of the prince, the Dowager-Duchess Hedwig in Harburg had various witches "burned on the high hill in Moisburg following rigorous investigations and ordeal by water " These were some of the last witches' trials in what is now Lower Saxony. Two of the women who ended up at the stake in Winsen in 1611 were sisters Anneke and Barbara Stehr from Amelinghausen. How it came about and what then happened to them was reported by the chantor (Kantor), Heinrich Schulz, from Egestorf in the Lüneburger Kreiskalender.

On Sunday, 7 June 1818, a fire occurred at Amelinghausen as mentioned in the second volume of the "Patriotic Archive" (Vaterländischen Archiv), a yearly chronicle. This same document also mentioned that, on 21 October 1818 in Clausthal, a powder store blew up, killing 27 people.

The unfortunate fire, which was not a result of war, was a major disaster for Amelinghausen, as the entire old part of the village was burned to ashes in just two hours. The acting pastor in Amelinghausen at that time, Jacob Heinrich Grewe, left a detailed report of the tragic event.

The ancient village church, built in 1501 with a round stone tower, was destroyed in this blaze.

== Administrative history ==
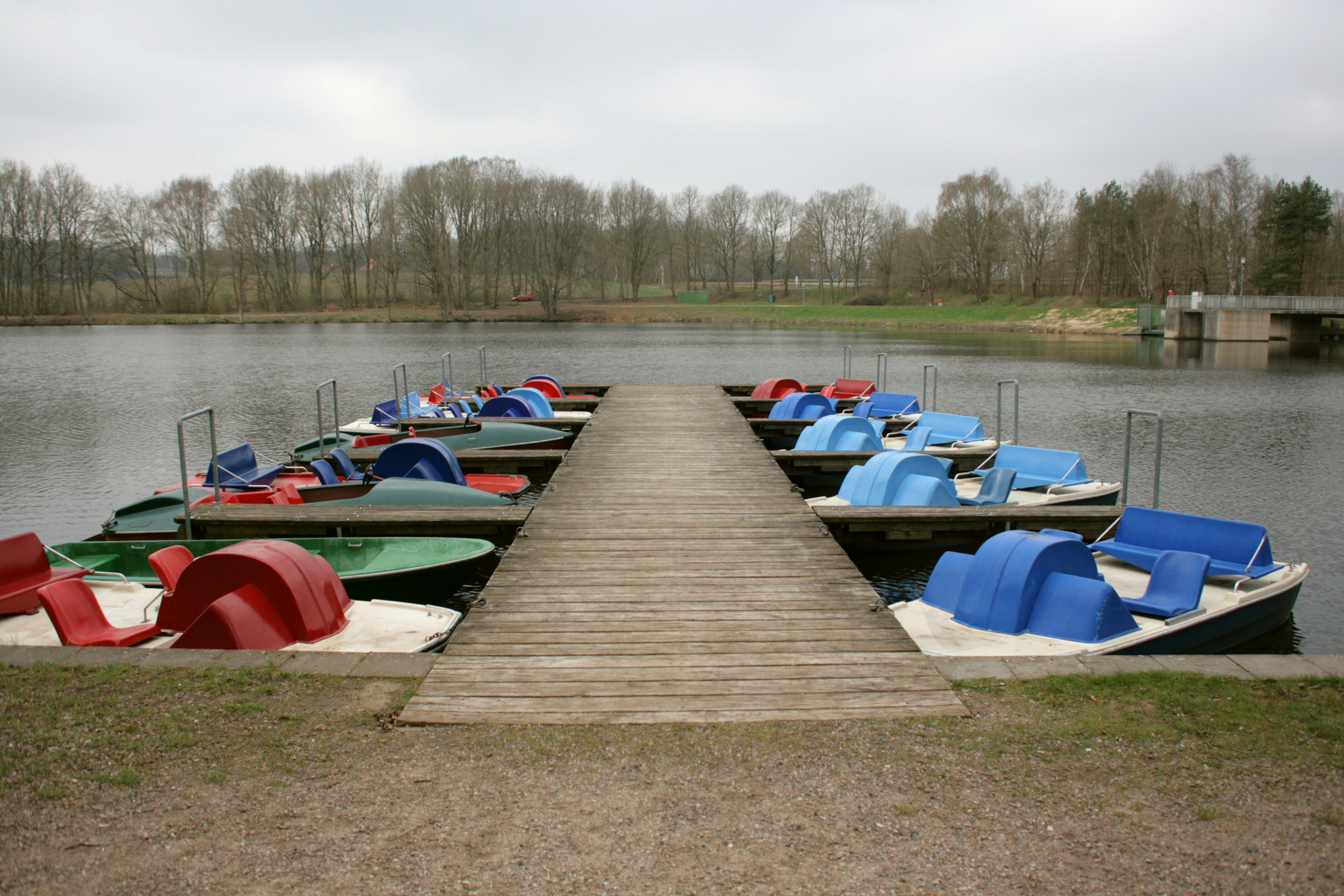
By the Lopausee lake

=== Saxon rule ===
Administrative divisions during Saxon times were the so-called Gaus (Gaue) with subordinate divisions known as Gohen. Amelinghausen belonged to the Bardengau, an area that cover the present day Lüneburg District and parts of Harburg, as well as Soltau and Uelzen. The Goh of Amelinghausen covered the region from the upper Luhe to the lower Lopau. Justic in the Gohen was dispensed by the so-called Gau or Goh counts (Gaugrafen or Gohgrafen). They were selected for office by the Saxon judicial parish (Gerichtsgemeinde).

At the head of a Gau stood a man elected by the people from the group of free nobles (Edelinge). At the end of the 8th century, the Frankish emperor, Charlemagne, allowed the old Gau system to continue, but placed imperial officials in charge instead of elected leaders. This resulted in the counts getting all the responsibility and power including legal jurisdiction. The offices and estates of the counts became hereditary in the course of time.

=== Regional development of Lüneburg Land ===
In 961 Emperor Otto I appointed the count, Hermann Billung, as Duke of Saxony. The new duke built his castle seat on the Lüneburg Kalkberg. From then on Lüneburg was the centre of his dominion. After the death of the Verden bishop, Amelung, who was Billung's brother, the Bishopric of Verden claimed Amelung's estates. Duke Hermann Billung did not agree to that and laid claim to his brother's estates, although he was probably excommunicated by the church as a result. In 1106 the duchy was transferred to Lothair of Supplinburg. Thanks to Lothair's status and wealth, underpinned by power, the duchy went in 1137 to the House of Welf and reached its heyday under Henry the Lion, but then came to an end. In 1235 the Duchy of Brunswick-Lüneburg was given to the Welf, Otto. In 1267, his sons, Albert and John, divided Brunswick-Lüneburg into the separate principalities of Brunswick and Lüneburg. Lüneburg remained in the hands of the Duke John's descendants until 1359. On 25 May 1428 the Welf dominion was redivided in Celle. Duke Bernard and his son, Otto, were given the Principality of Lüneburg. The Principality of Brunswick-Wolfenbüttel was given to Bernard's brother.

=== District constitution in Lüneburg ===
Gradually the Saxon Gau structure was replaced by the so-called district constitution (Amtsverfassung). The beginnings of this local constitution in the Lüneburg princedom go back to the 14th century. During the course of the 13th century the Welf dukes created administrative units known as Verwaltungseinheiten. The centre of the new districts was a castle in which th most important man acted as the Burgvogt or castle administrator. The replacement administrative system functioned surprisingly well, because the then advocates (Vögte) were ducal officials and received estates awarded by the dukes. In the 16th century there was a centralisation and systematisation of the old administration. The expansion of the Lüneburg district constitution continued into the 16th century. At the end of the 18th century, the whole Principality of Lüneburg was divided into 29 districts or Ämter.

=== Amelinghausen's sphere of influence ===
The contemporary designation, "Vogtei Amelinghausen" (Advocacy of Amelinghausen), is first found in the fiscal register (Schatzregister) of 1450. The register shows once a year a tax on the occupants registered within the district under Amelinghausen's ambit. The Advocacy of Amelinghausen appears in the fiscal register with the note: Uppe der Tecche, which Hammerstein Loxten suspects, is a description from the time before the destruction of the castle on the Lüneburg Kalkberg in which, in his opinion, the collection office for the income from the villages in this region was located. In the 15th century the following 39 villages belonged to the Advocacy of Amelinghausen: Munster, Ilster, Kohlenbissen, Schmarbeck, Trauen, Creutzen, Bispingen, Behringen, Haverbeck, Ehrhorn, Wilsede, Evendorf, Hörpel, Volkwardingen, Borstel, Hützel, Steinbeck, Garlstorf, Toppenstedt, Putensen, Südergellersen, Drögennindorf, Betzendorf, Diersbüttel, Rehlingen, Holtorf, Ehlbeck, Dehnsen, Etzen, Wohlenbüttel, Oldendorf, Marxen, Harlsem, Schwindebeck, Sottorf, Soderstorf, Rolfsen, Wetzen and Amelinghausen.

=== The district advocacy of Amelinghausen ===
The employment of district advocates (Amtsvögte) was the responsibility of the chancellery (Kanzlei) in Celle. The first six advocates were: Hans von Iburg, Harman Lucht, Joachim Brabandt, Fritz Eltze, Viktor Dolle and Peter Oberg. The names of the first six are known from a letter by the later district advocacy of Enckhausen dated 12 August 1646.

=== The new administration of 1810–1866 ===
The district administrative system, despite lasting until 1885, experience an interruption in the Napoleonic era. The French prefecture system was transferred to German territory in 1810. This system had four types of administrative and juridical levels. The largest was the département, that was headed by a prefecture, alongside whom worked a general secretary. In addition there was a prefecturate comprising three or four members, who exercised jurisdiction in the case of disputes in administrative matters. The département was divided into individual districts (Distrikte). The smallest units were the communes (Kommunen) or municipalities (Munizipalitäten). Twenty-five to thirty villages or communes were grouped into a mayoralty (mairie). At the head of a mairie was the mayor or Bürgermeister. Then there were the cantons (Kantone), that had about 5,000 inhabitants. The largest part of the Advocacy of Amelinghausen belonged from 4 July 1811 to the Mairie of Behringen. A new constitution of the then Hanoverian district constitution entered force on 1 October 1852. Since then, administration and justice have been separated.

=== Development of administration under Prussian influence ===
Despite the annexation of the region by Prussia, its administration and justice remained much as before. However, the Prussian state believed it necessary to have a special level of administration between the district office (Amt) and the state seneschal (Landdrostei). In Lüneburg, Prussia created seven such counties (Kreise). The resulting counties were divided up into larger land owners, representatives of towns and representatives of rural parishes. In 1928 the county of Lüneburg was divided into 71 rural parishes. At the head of the county created in 1867 stood a Landrat, who was not an elected president, but a Prussian official. From 1885 to 1919 half of the members of the Lüneburg county council were from the rural parishes and half from the larger country landowners.

== Personalities ==
- Joachim Bauck (1941-2009), farmer and pioneer of organic farming; lived and worked locally
- Ilka Brüggemann (* 1968), journalist and author; grew up in Amelinghausen
- Jenny Elvers (* 1972), actress; lived in the village and was queen of the Heideblütenfest in 1990
- Claudia Kalisch (* 1972); 2015-2021 full-time mayor of Amelinghausen.
- Jan Vetter (* 1963), musician (Die Ärzte); lives in Amelinghausen
- Stephan Bothe (* 1984), AfD politician; lives in Amelinghausen
