= Oldendorf =

Oldendorf can refer to several places in Germany:

- in Lower Saxony:
  - Oldendorf (Celle district), a village in the district of Celle, part of the municipality Hermannsburg
  - Oldendorf, Stade, a municipality in the district of Stade
  - Oldendorf (Samtgemeinde), a collective municipality in Stade
  - Oldendorf (Luhe), part of the Samtgemeinde Amelinghausen in the district of Lüneburg
  - Hessisch Oldendorf, a town in the district Hamelin-Pyrmont
  - Stadtoldendorf, a town and a Samtgemeinde in the district of Holzminden
  - Oldendorf, Melle, a municipality in the district of Osnabrück
- in North Rhine-Westphalia:
  - Preußisch Oldendorf, a town in the district Minden-Lübbecke
- in Schleswig-Holstein:
  - Oldendorf, Schleswig-Holstein, part of the Amt Itzehoe-Land in the district Steinburg

Oldendorf can also refer to:

- William H. Oldendorf, American neurologist and pioneer in neuroimaging
- Jesse B. Oldendorf, US Navy task force commander in the 7th Fleet, during World War II
