= Lopau =

River in Germany

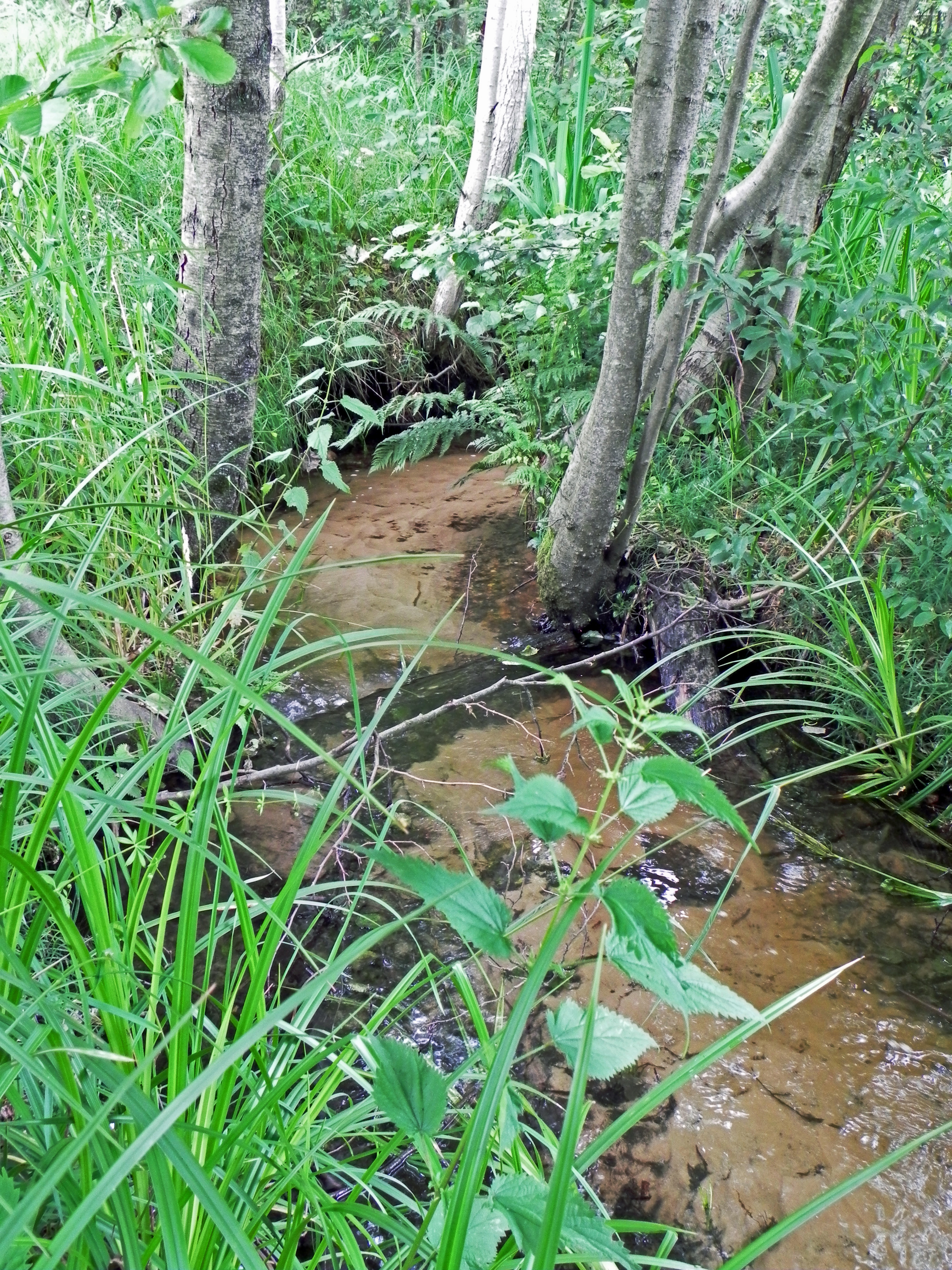

Location
- Country: Germany
- State: Lower Saxony

Physical characteristics
- Source
  - location: source streams in the parish of Lopau
  - coordinates: 53°03′23″N 10°12′16″E
  - elevation: 70 m above sea level (NN)
- Mouth
  - location: near Oldendorf into the Luhe
  - coordinates: 53°08′43″N 10°12′55″E
  - elevation: 37 m above sea level (NN)
- Length: 12.8 km (8.0 mi)
- Basin size: 101 km^{2} (39 sq mi)

Basin features
- Progression: Luhe→ Ilmenau→ Elbe→ North Sea
- Landmarks: Small towns: Lopau, a village in Munster borough; Villages: Rehlingen, Amelinghausen
- Tributaries
  - left: Ehlbeck
- Waterbodies: Lakes: Lopausee

The Lopau is a river in the Lüneburg Heath in North Germany. It is a right tributary of the Luhe.

== Course ==
The Lopau rises with two headstreams from the ponds known as the Süderteichen and the Westerteichen in the Westergrund in the Munster North Training Area, near the abandoned village of Lopau, that lies within the borough of Munster. In its upper reaches the Lopau flows through uncultivated grassland, which is becoming increasingly afforested by alders and invaded by the wooded area of the Raubkammer. In Bockum, a village in the municipality of Rehlingen in Lüneburg District, it picks up the Ehlbeck, a left-hand tributary. East of Amelinghausen the river is impounded by a dam by the B 209 federal road to create the tourist lake of Lopausee. North of Amelinghausen the Lopau discharges into the Luhe near the gravesite of Oldendorfer Totenstatt by Oldendorf (Luhe). From source to mouth the river is 12.7 km.
