= Bispingen =

- Municipality
- Coat of arms

- Location of Bispingen within Heidekreis district
- Interactive map of Bispingen
- Location within Germany Location within Lower Saxony
- Coordinates: 53°04′58″N 9°59′54″E
- Country: Germany
- State: Lower Saxony
- District: Heidekreis
- Subdivisions: 9 Ortsteile

Government
  - Mayor (2018–23): Jens Bülthius

Area
  - Total: 128.55 km^{2} (49.63 sq mi)
- Elevation: 90 m (300 ft)

Population (2025-12-31)
  - Total: 6,568
  - Density: 51.09/km^{2} (132.3/sq mi)
- Time zone: UTC+01:00 (CET)
  - Summer (DST): UTC+02:00 (CEST)
- Postal codes: 29646
- Dialling codes: 05194
- Vehicle registration: HK
- Website: www.bispingen.de

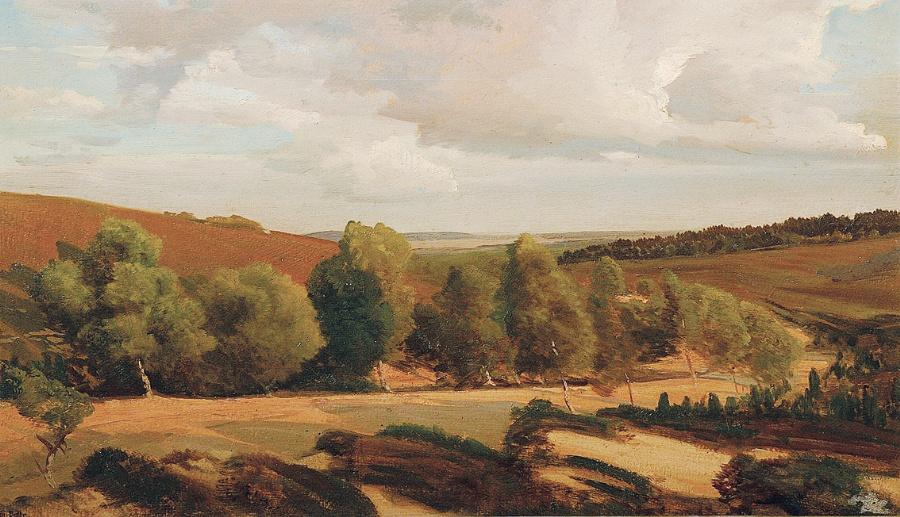
Valentin Ruths (1825–1905): Wilseder Höhe

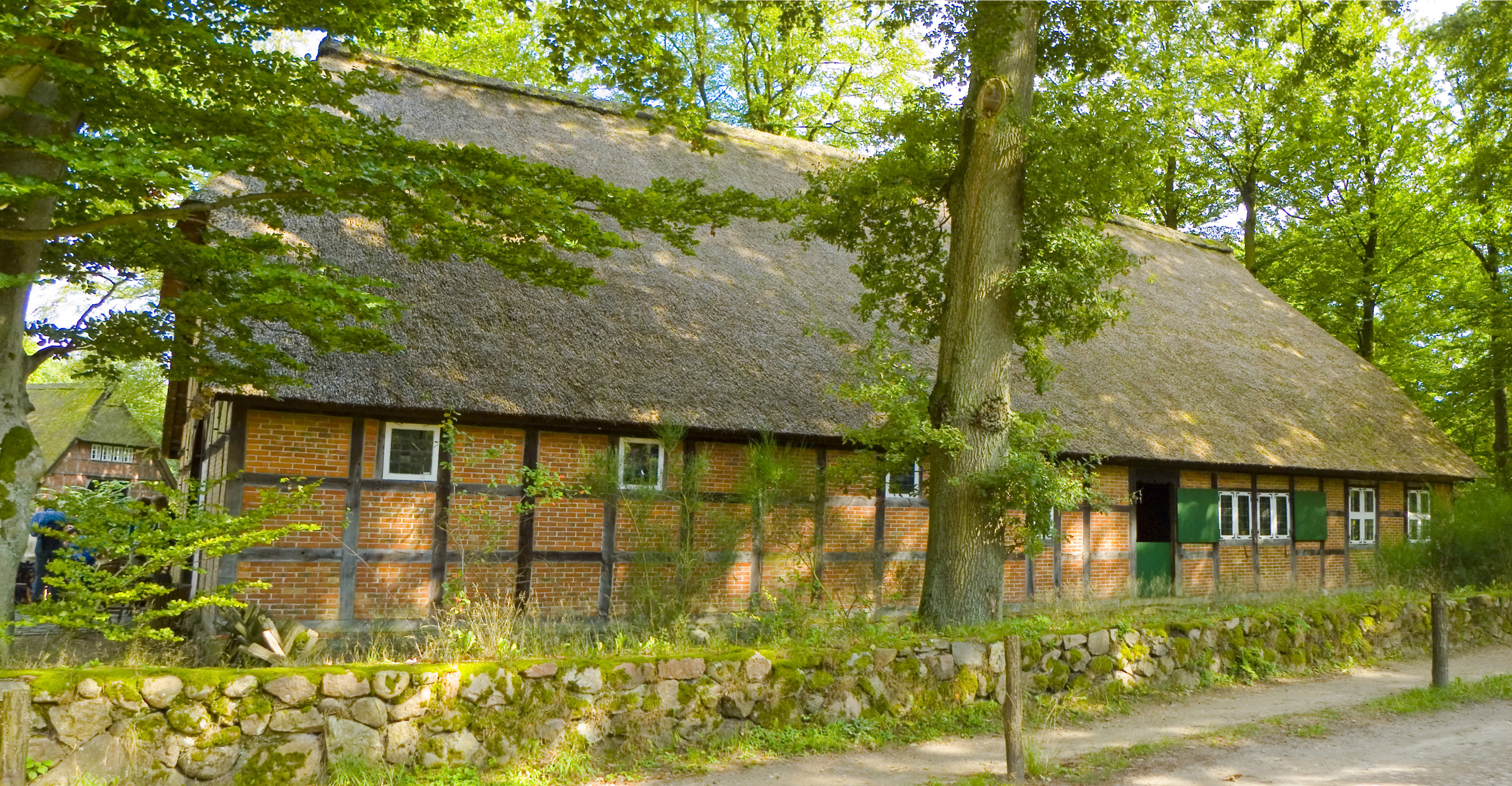
Dat ole Huus in Wilsede

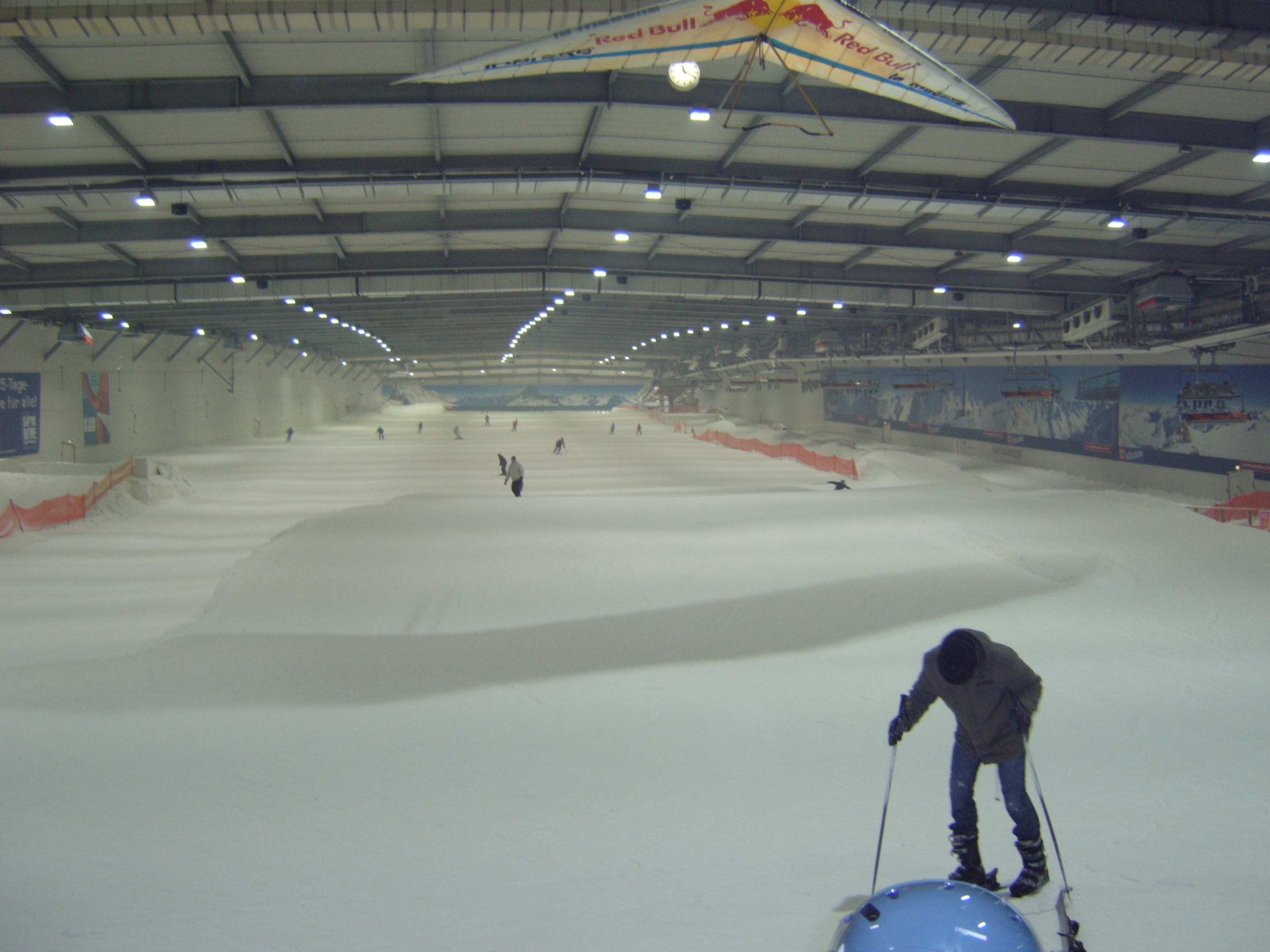
Bispingen SnowDome

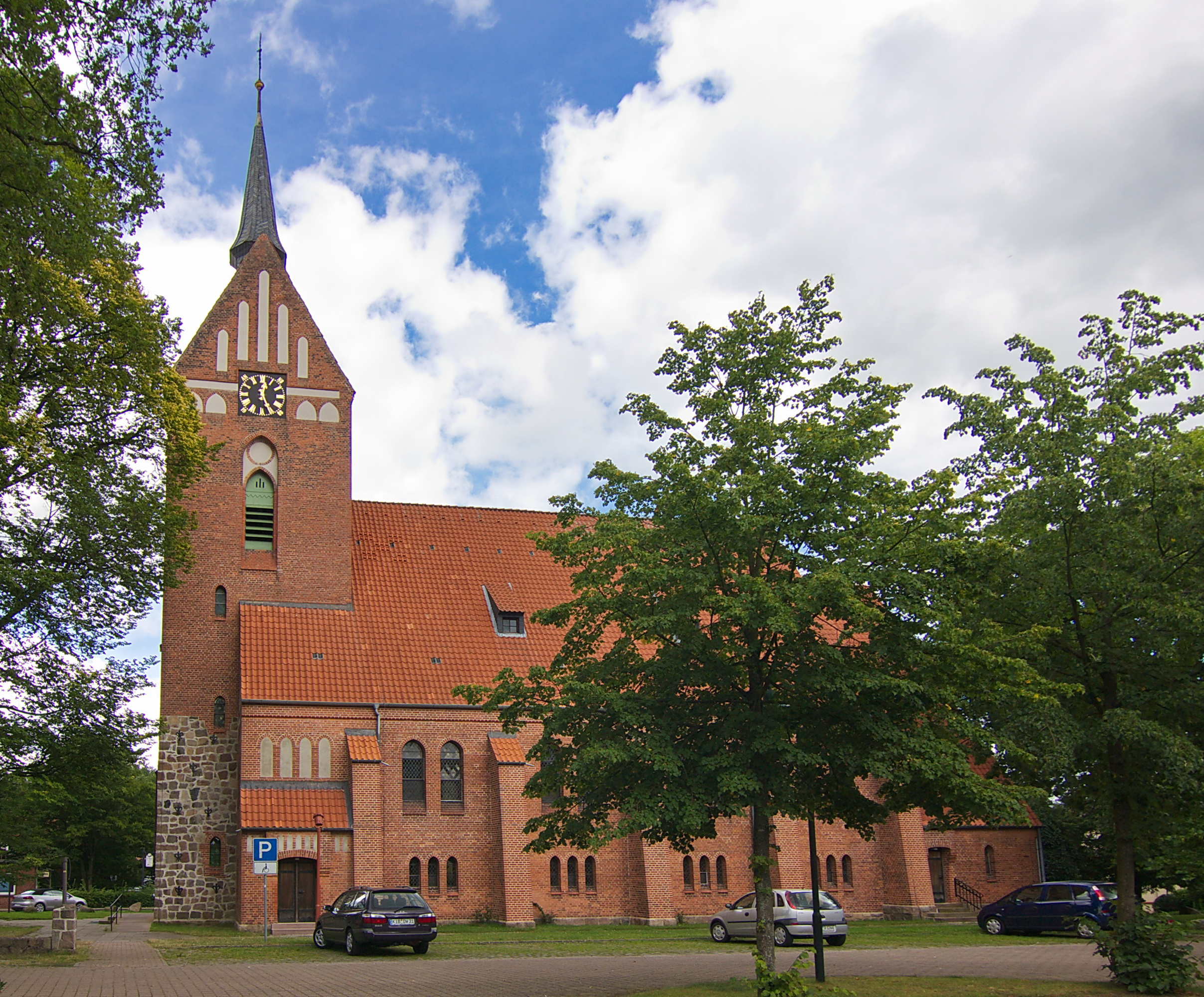
St.Antonius-Kirche in Bispingen

Bispingen (Low German: Bissen) is a municipality in the Heidekreis district of Lower Saxony, Germany. It is a popular tourist destination with several holiday/theme parks. Its territory also includes the nature preserve of the Lüneburg Heath around the Wilseder Berg.

== Geography ==
=== Location ===
Bispingen is located on the River Luhe and is approximately 15 km (9.3 mi) northeast of Soltau, or 50 km (31 mi) south of Hamburg. Bispingen lies near interchange 43 of the A 7 motorway.

=== Subdivisions ===
- Bispingen
- Hützel
- Steinbeck an der Luhe (Steinbeck/Luhe)
- Behringen
- Volkwardingen
- Hörpel
- Borstel
- Haverbeck (Nieder- and Oberhaverbeck)
- Wilsede, heath village at the foot of the Wilseder Berg; population: ~35

=== Neighbouring villages and towns ===
- Schneverdingen
- Undeloh
- Egestorf
- Soderstorf
- Rehlingen
- Munster
- Soltau

== Economy ==
Bispingen is popular with tourists as a local recreation area and nature reserve.

== Places of interest ==
- Wilseder Berg, the highest hill on the Lüneburg Heath
- Dat ole Huus, a Low German house in Wilsede, one of the oldest open-air museums in Germany; built c. 1540, renovated 1742, moved to Wilsede 1907
- Iserhatsche, a landscape garden with hunting lodge and Montagnetto model castle
- Burial ground in Volkwardingen with Bronze Age tumuli
- Ole Kerk ("Old Church") dating to 1353, made from boulders; used for baptisms, weddings and other services as well as concerts
- Treppenspeicher in Volkwardingen, one of the oldest of this type of storage barn in the Lüneburg Heath, built in 1600 and 1702, restored in 2001
- Kart Centre, owned by racing driver Ralf Schumacher
- SnowDome Bispingen provides indoor skiing and snowboarding. It opened in autumn 2006
- Bispinger Heide holiday park, part of the Center Parcs chain

== Notable people ==
- Waldemar Grube, founder of the firm, Grube KG Forstgerätestelle, which makes forestry equipment.

== Gallery ==
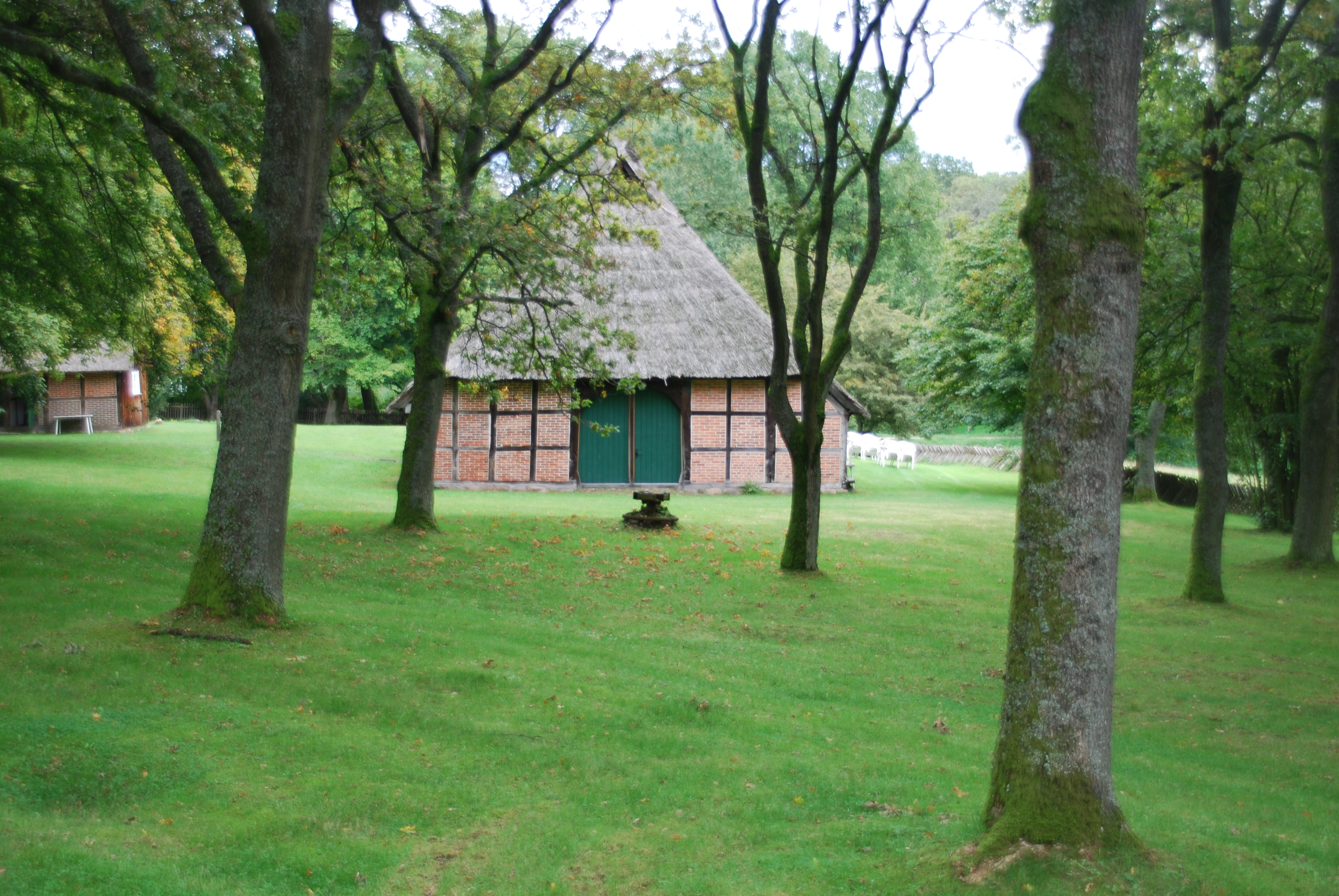
Farmstead in Wilsede

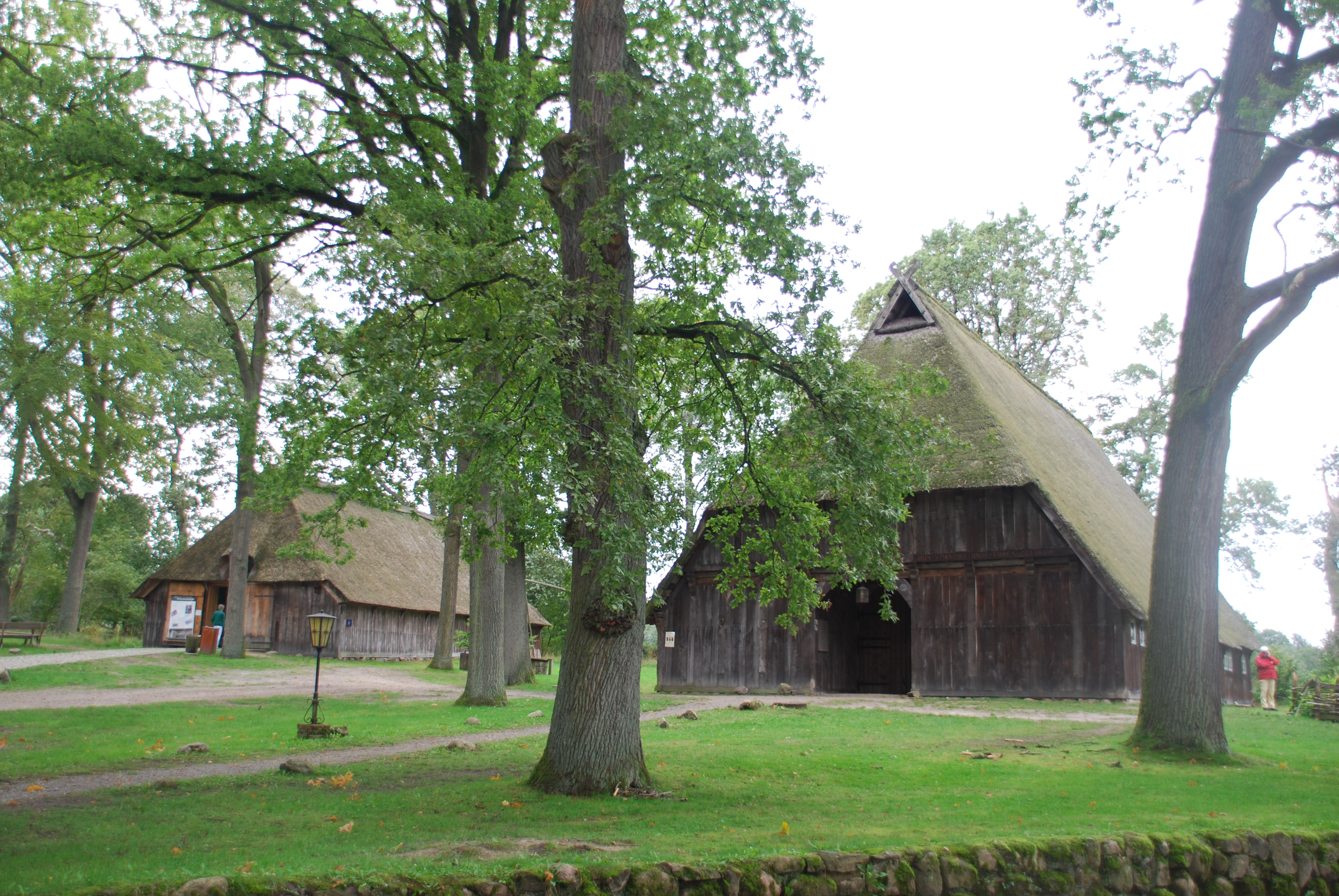
Wilsede

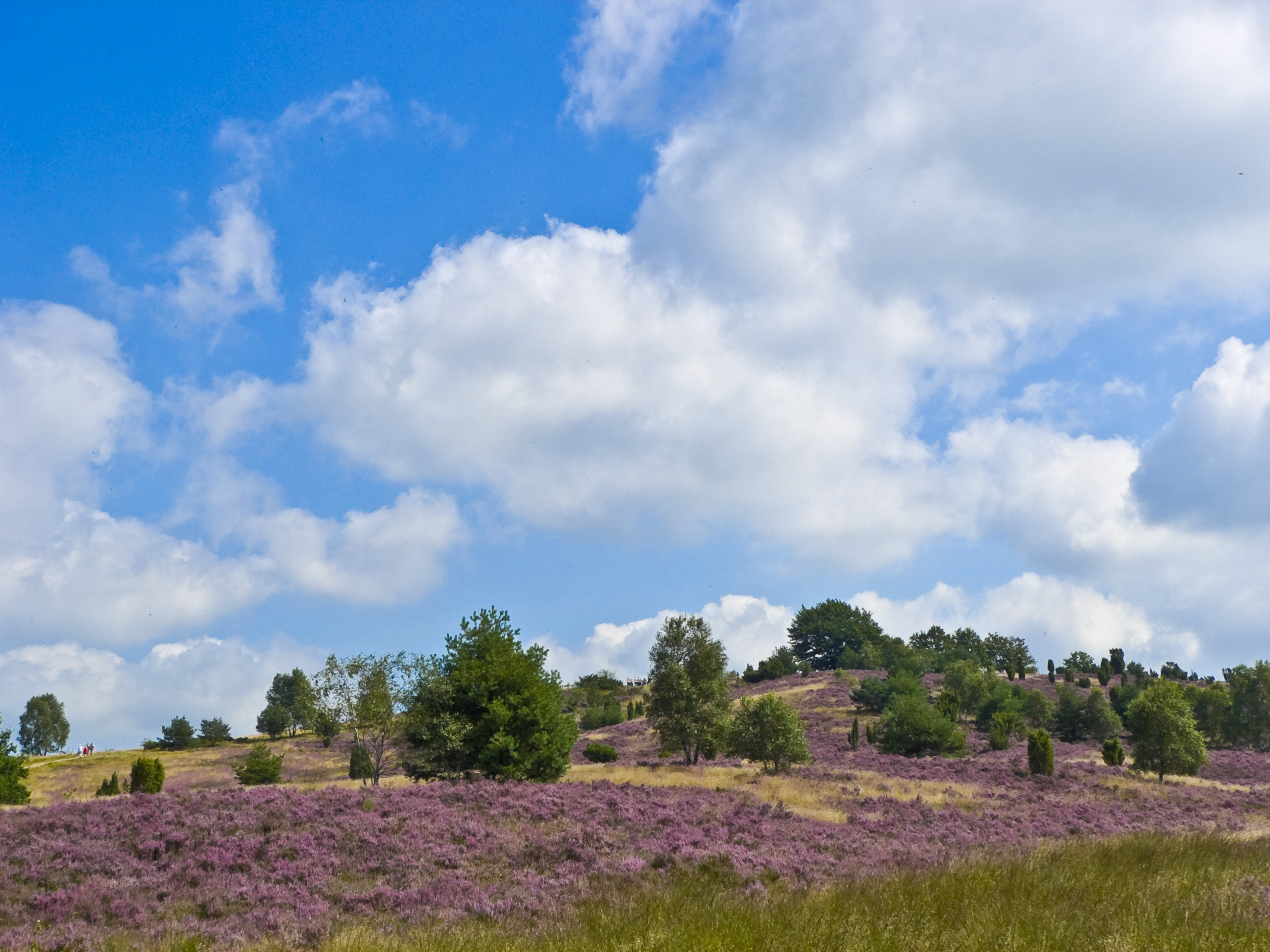
The Wilseder Berg

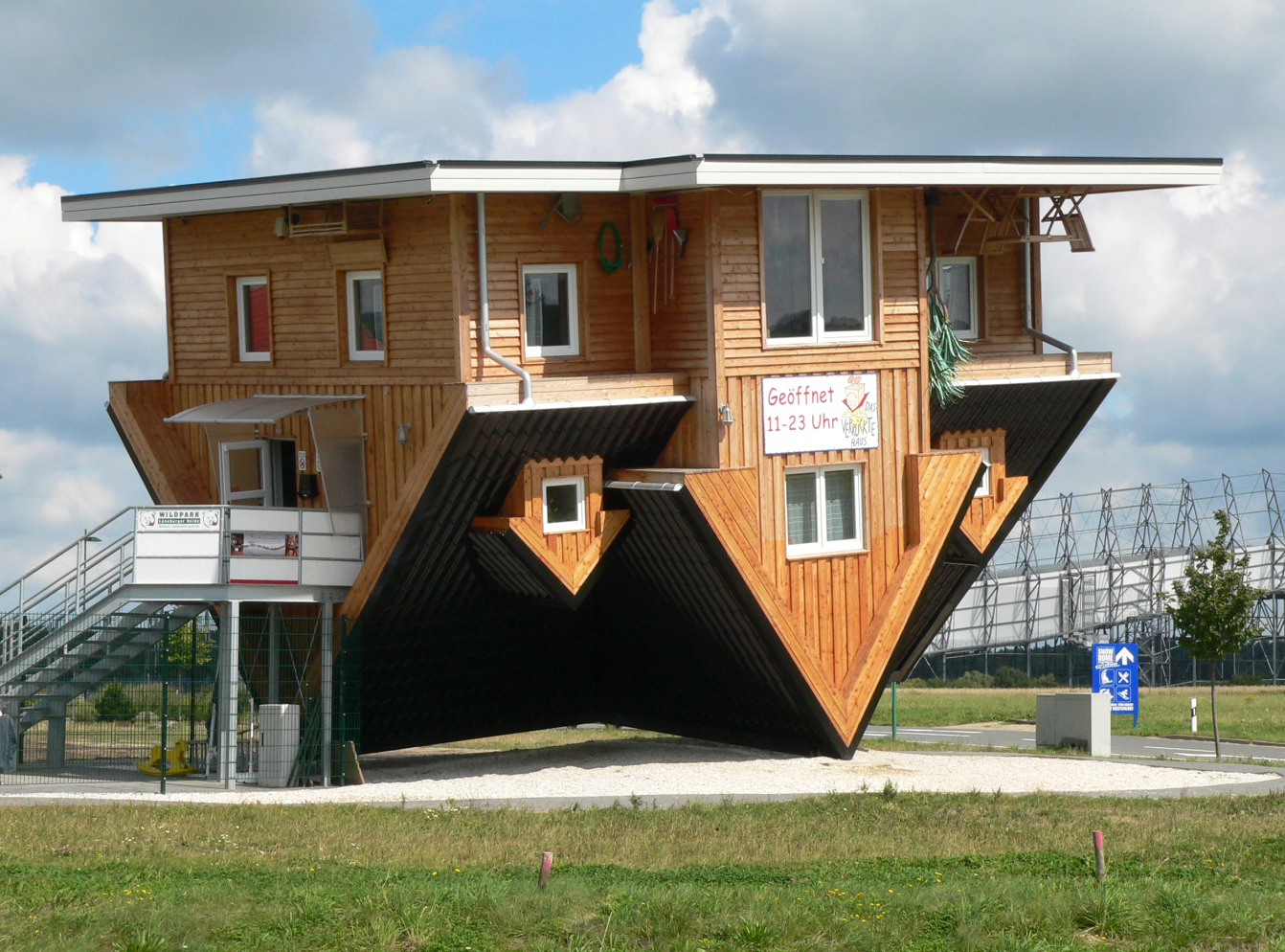
Mad House, the upside down house
