= Brunau (Luhe) =

River in Germany

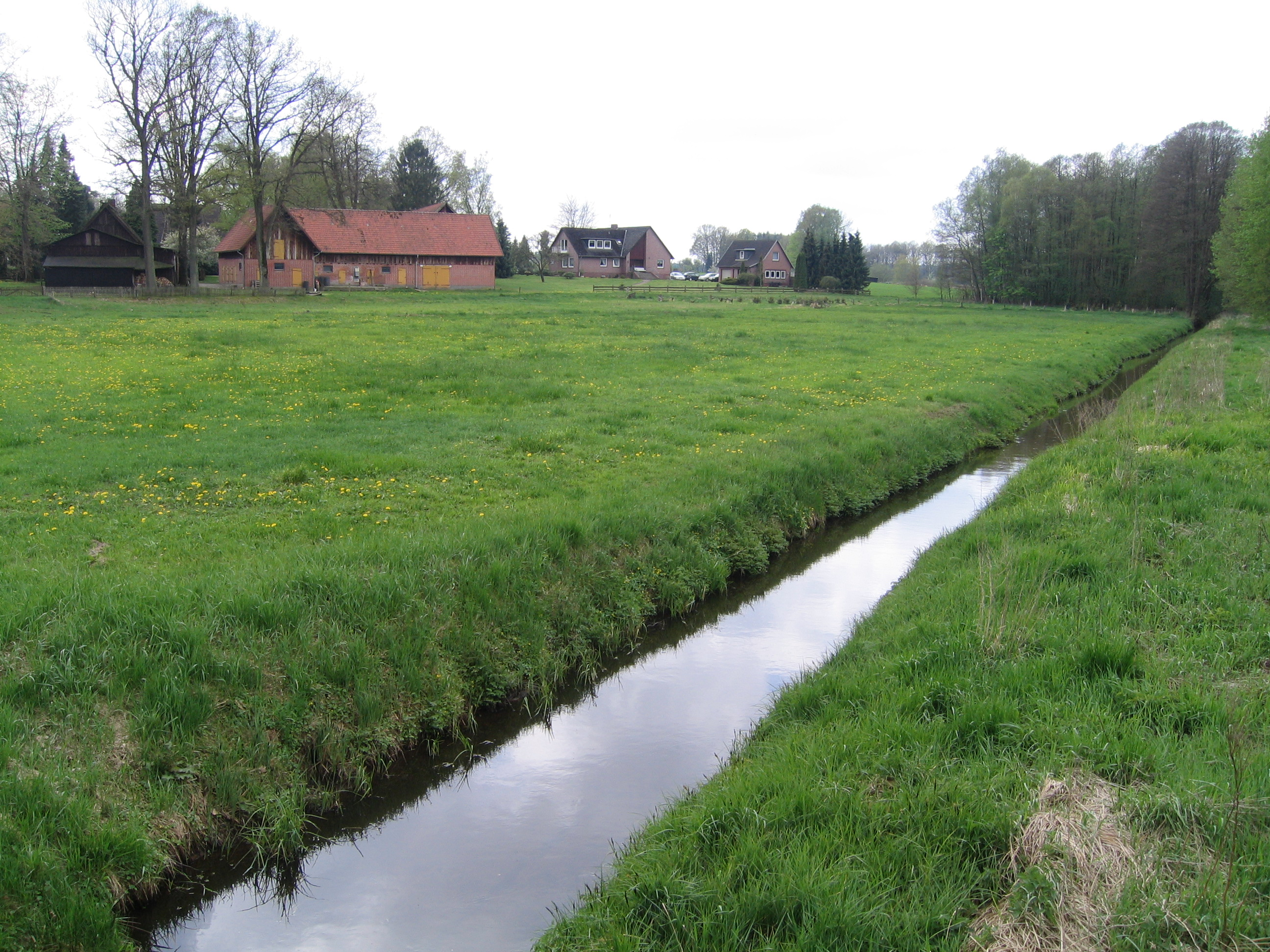
- River Brunau near An der Horst (behind)

Location
- Country: Germany
- State: Lower Saxony

Physical characteristics
- Source
  - location: Northeast of the Wulfsberg near Behringen
  - coordinates: 53°07′49″N 9°54′53″E
  - elevation: 84 m above sea level (NN)
- Mouth
  - location: near Hützel into the Luhe
  - coordinates: 53°05′50″N 10°01′49″E
  - elevation: 61 m above sea level (NN)
- Length: 10.3 km (6.4 mi)

Basin features
- Progression: Luhe→ Ilmenau→ Elbe→ North Sea
- Waterbodies: Lakes: Brunausee

The Brunau (German pronunciation: [ˈbʁuːnaʊ]) is a small river, 10.3 kilometres (6.4 mi) long, in the district of Soltau-Fallingbostel, on the Lüneburg Heath in North Germany. It rises south of Niederhaverbeck in the Lüneburg Heath Nature Reserve. Near Hützel, a village in the northeastern part of Bispingen, it discharges into the Luhe from the left bank. The water quality of the worsens as it flows downstream from north of Bispingen to its confluence with the Luhe, going from Class II: moderately polluted, to Class II – III: critically polluted.

== See also ==
- List of rivers of Lower Saxony
