= Masters M40 javelin throw world record progression =

Masters M40 javelin throw world record progression is the progression of world record improvements of the javelin throw M40 division of Masters athletics. Records must be set in properly conducted, official competitions under the standing IAAF rules unless modified by World Masters Athletics. The M40 division consists of male athletes who have reached the age of 40 but have not yet reached the age of 45, so exactly from their 40th birthday to the day before their 45th birthday. The M40 division throws an 800 g implement. These competitors threw their world record performances in Open competition.

Key

Incomplete information Pending

Distance	Athlete	Nationality	Birthdate	Location	Date
85.92	Jan Železný	Czech Republic	16.06.1966	Gothenburg	11.08.2006
84.08	Peter Blank	Germany	10.04.1962	Ulm	29.06.2003
82.24	Peter Blank	Germany	10.04.1962	Rehlingen	20.05.2002
78.94	Yury Subbotin	Russia	01.01.1958	Bryansk	31.05.1996
78.84	Jorma Markus	Finland	28.11.1952	Kempele	21.06.1994
75.94	Toivo Moorast	Estonia	05.01.1952	Tartu	15.05.1992
75.28	Janis Zirnis	Soviet Union	28.11.1947	Riga	01.09.1989
70.24	Esa Kiuru	Finland	14.04.1947	Asikkala	13.08.1987
68.92	Marinko Primorac	Yugoslavia	25.06.1945	Zagreb	25.07.1987
