= Luhe (Ilmenau) =

River in Germany

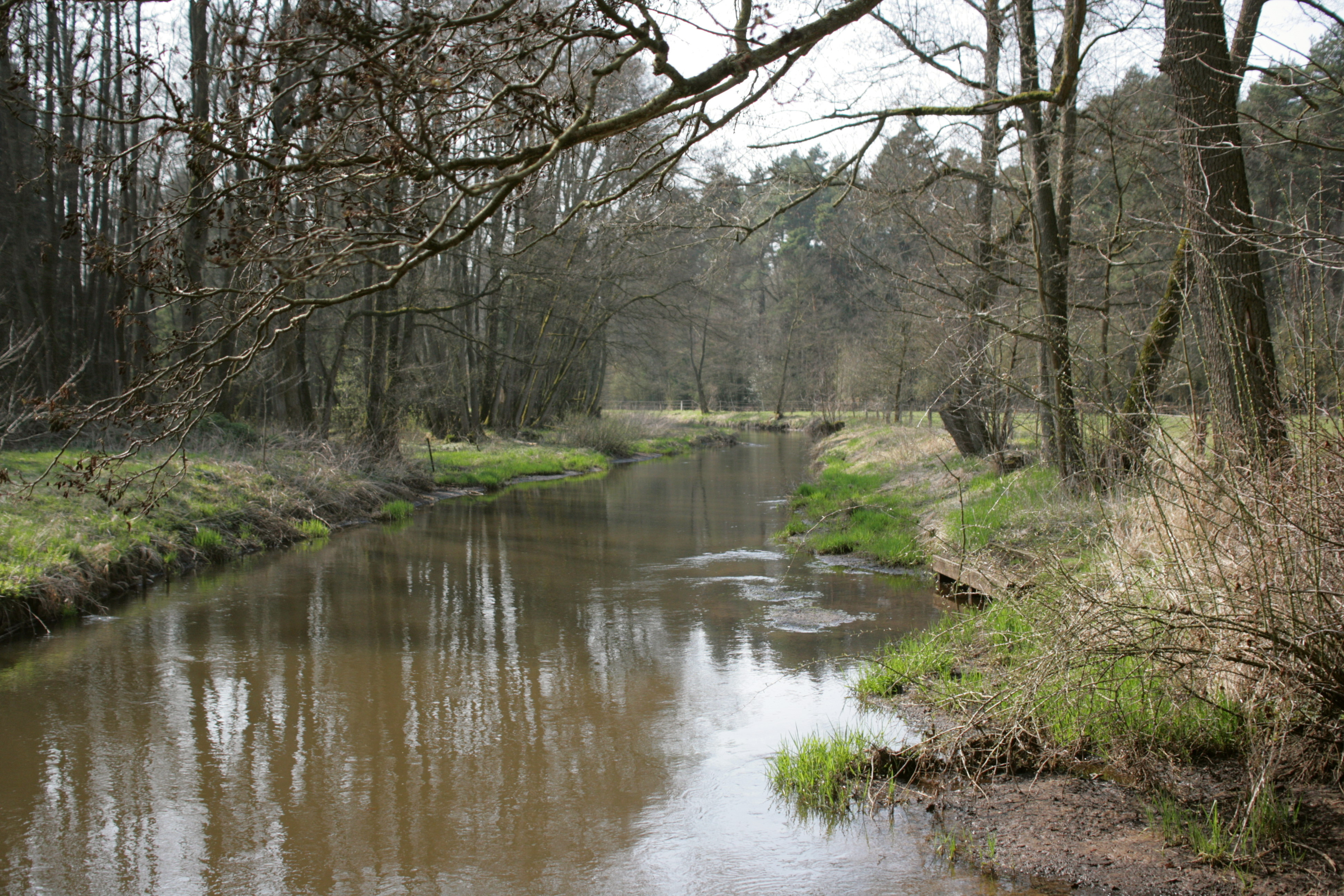
- The River Luhe near Wohlenbüttel

Location
- Country: Germany
- State: Lower Saxony
- Reference no.: DE: 5948

Physical characteristics
- Source
  - location: Bispingen
  - coordinates: 53°04′01″N 9°58′49″E
  - elevation: 80 m (260 ft)
- Mouth
  - location: Ilmenau near Stöckte
  - coordinates: 53°23′04″N 10°12′20″E
  - elevation: 7 m (23 ft)
- Length: 56.1 km (34.9 mi)
- Basin size: 476 km^{2} (184 sq mi)

Basin features
- Progression: Ilmenau→ Elbe→ North Sea
- Landmarks: Large towns: Winsen (Luhe); Villages: Bispingen, Soderstorf, Oldendorf (Luhe), Salzhausen
- Tributaries
  - left: Brunau, Schwinde, Garlstorfer Aue
  - right: Lopau

The Luhe (German pronunciation: [ˈluːə]) is a river in Lower Saxony, Germany. It runs through the Lüneburg Heath, and discharges into the Ilmenau and thus is part of the Elbe river system.

The entire catchment area of the Luhe has been heavily populated since the New Stone Age as evinced by sites like the monuments at Soderstorf and the Oldendorfer Totenstatt grave sites. At the height of the present-day town of Winsen (Luhe), a bridge over the Luhe was controlled by Winsen Castle from the 13th century onwards.

== See also ==
- List of rivers of Lower Saxony
