= Necropolis of Soderstorf =

Cemetery located in Lower Saxony, Germany

- Nekropole von Soderstorf
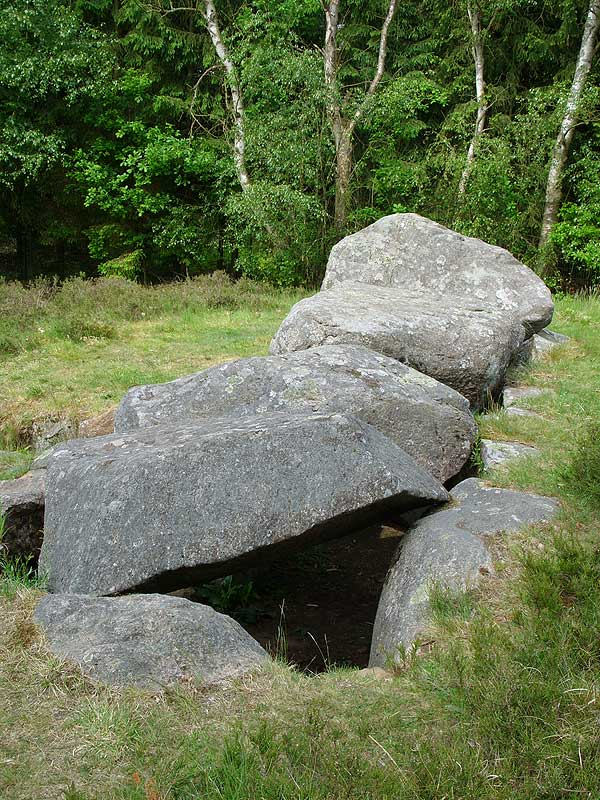
- The megalithic grave of Soderstorf

- Location in Lower Saxony, Germany
- 53°08′38″N 10°10′08″E
- Type: Necropolis
- Periods: Neolithic to Iron Age
- Cultures: Funnelbeaker, Corded Ware, Tumulus, Urnfield
- Location: Soderstorf, Lower Saxony, Germany

History
- Built: c. 3150 BC

Site notes
- Excavation dates: 1883, 1970
- Discovered: 1883

The Necropolis of Soderstorf is a prehistoric cemetery in the valley of the Luhe river valley near Soderstorf in the Lüneburg district of Lower Saxony, Germany. The site was used for more than 2,000 years. It includes a megalithic tomb, a tumulus tomb, a stone circle, paving stones, funerary urns and a flat grave.

== Megalithic tomb ==
The megalithic tomb was erected between 3500 and 2800 BC by people of the Funnelbeaker culture in the Neolithic period. The grave was excavated in 1883 and given Sprockhoff number 682. The tomb has an east-west orientation and measures ten by three meters. It consists of eleven supporting stones which carry four capstones. The inner chamber measures 6.2 by 1.65 meters and is still covered by a mound of earth near the supporting stones. The entrance is located on the southern long side, slightly off the center. It was built on a round hill which was raised during the Bronze Age for more burials and surrounded by a stone circle. The floor of the inner chamber was covered with granite boulders.

Further investigation started in 1970 demonstrated that the tomb had been used in multiple phases. Finds from the early Funnelbeaker culture were few. Finds from the subsequent Corded Ware culture proved to be more numerous in the chamber and its surroundings. In the early Bronze Age the hill was transformed. The grave associated with the redesign had probably been destroyed accidentally during the 1883 excavation. The arm rings found then could be probably considered as grave goods from that period. In the early Bronze Age the hill was surrounded halfway up with a second narrow stone circle. In the hill bed cremated remains were found that exhibit the usual burial custom of the time.

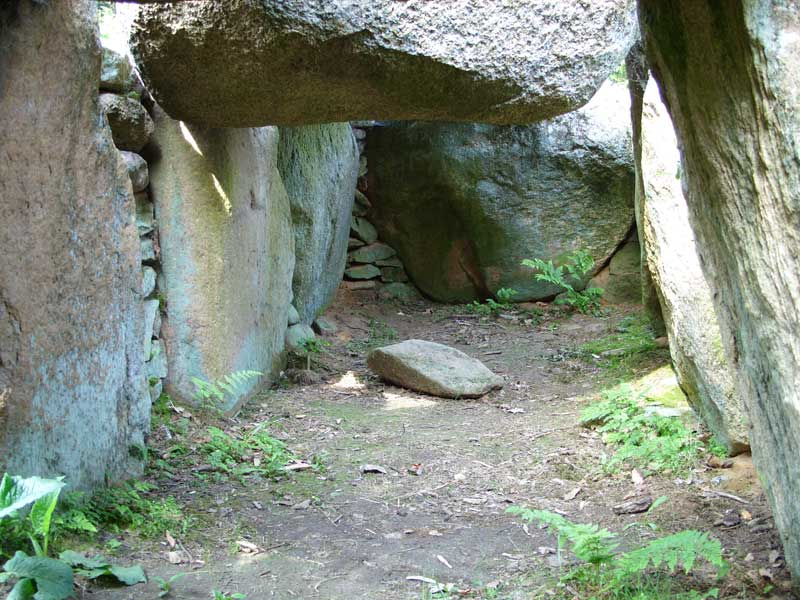
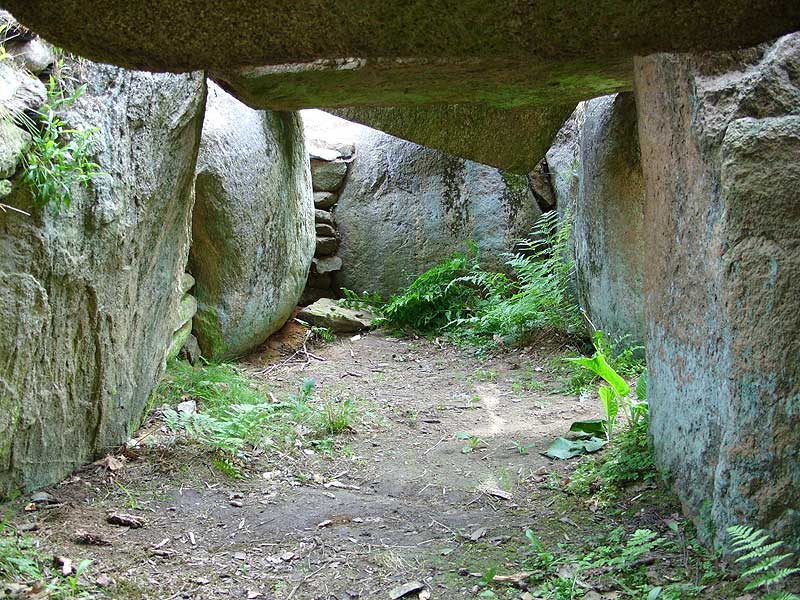
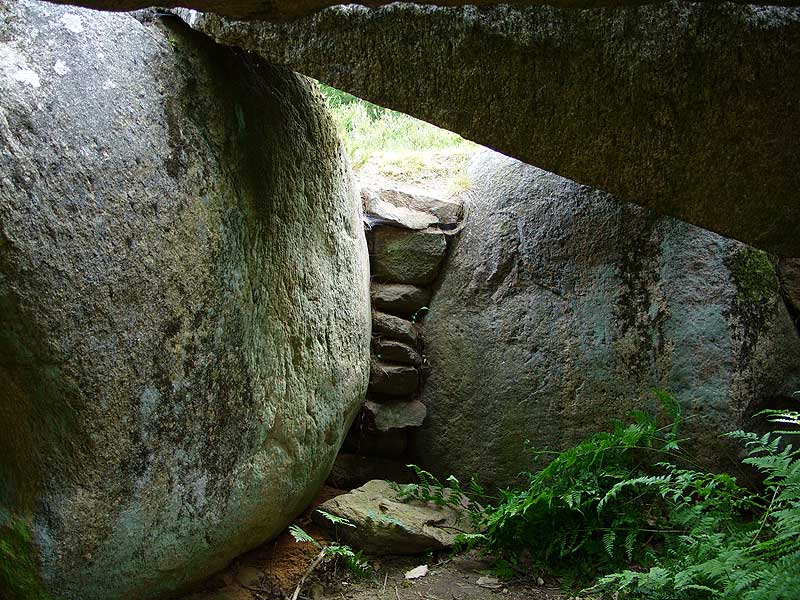
Details of the megalithic tomb's inner chamber

== Tumulus tomb ==
South of the megalithic tomb is a Bronze Age tumulus with a stone ring around its foot. Tombs of this kind are characteristic for the Tumulus culture named after this burial practice. Soil discoloration indicated two treetrunk coffin burials. A palstave and bronze needle were found as grave goods. There were more tumuli in the area which have been destroyed.

== Urnfield cemetery ==
The Urnfield culture which succeeded the Tumulus culture is also represented at the site. This culture was named after its method of burial as well, the burial of cremated remains in urnfields. An urnfield cemetery with 940 graves dating to the early Iron Age lies between the megalithic tomb and the tumulus tomb. The graves are covered by heterogeneous stone pavement of up to four meters in diameter next to a standing stone. Circles of small stelae surround the graves and probably served to mark the graves and to protect the earthenware vessels. Occasionally, the cremated remains lay in a small stone box. Mainly adults were buried here, it was mostly women whose urns lay under the cobblestone pavement.

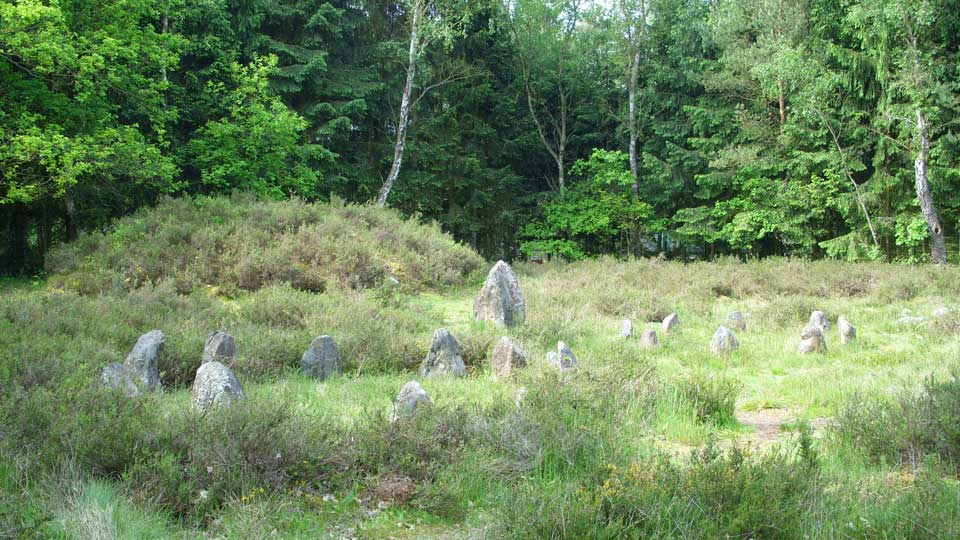
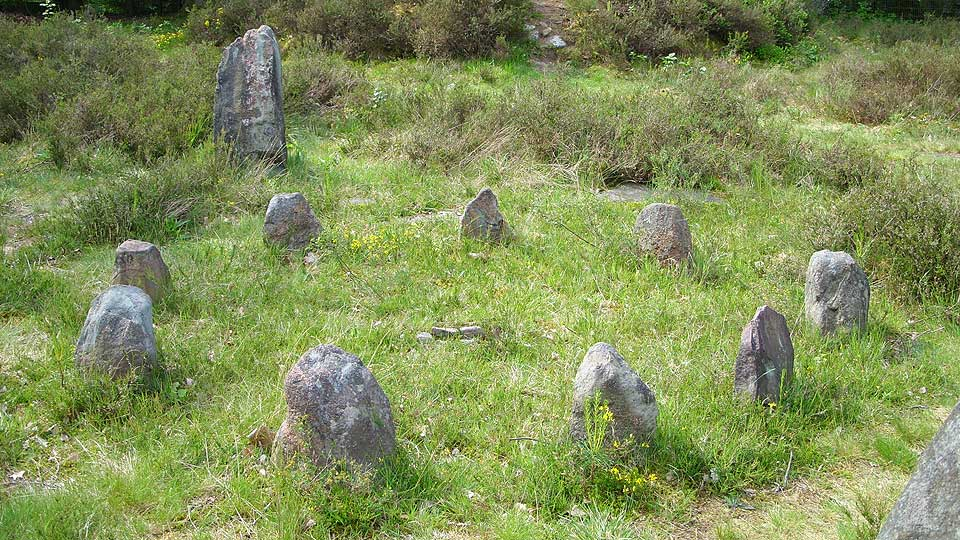
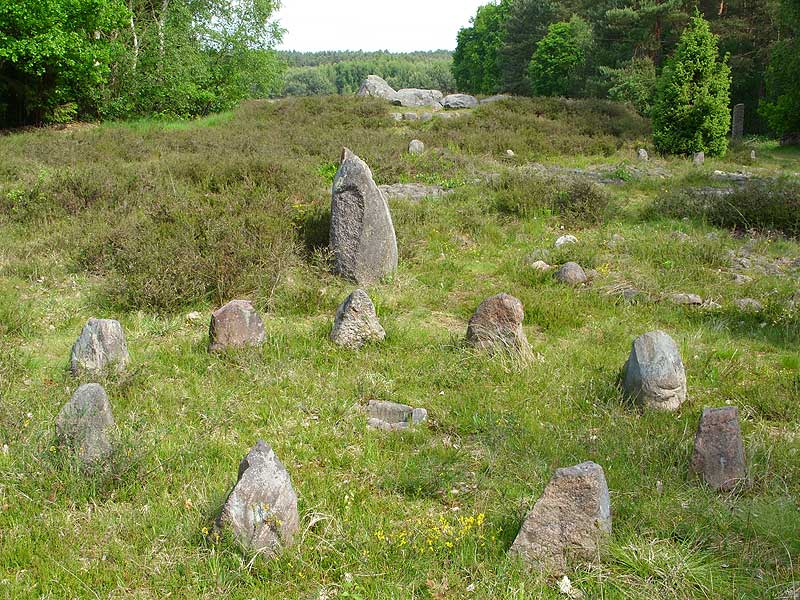
Megaliths and small stelae surround the graves in the urnfield cemetery

== Flat grave ==
In a less densely populated part of the urn cemetery a flat grave was found which dated to the Funnelbeaker culture. A stone axe was found as grave good.

== See also ==
- Nordic megalith architecture
