= Lüneburg Heath Nature Park =

Nature park in northern Germany

Coordinates: 53.17°N 9.92°E

- Naturpark Lüneburger Heide
- IUCN category V (protected landscape/seascape)
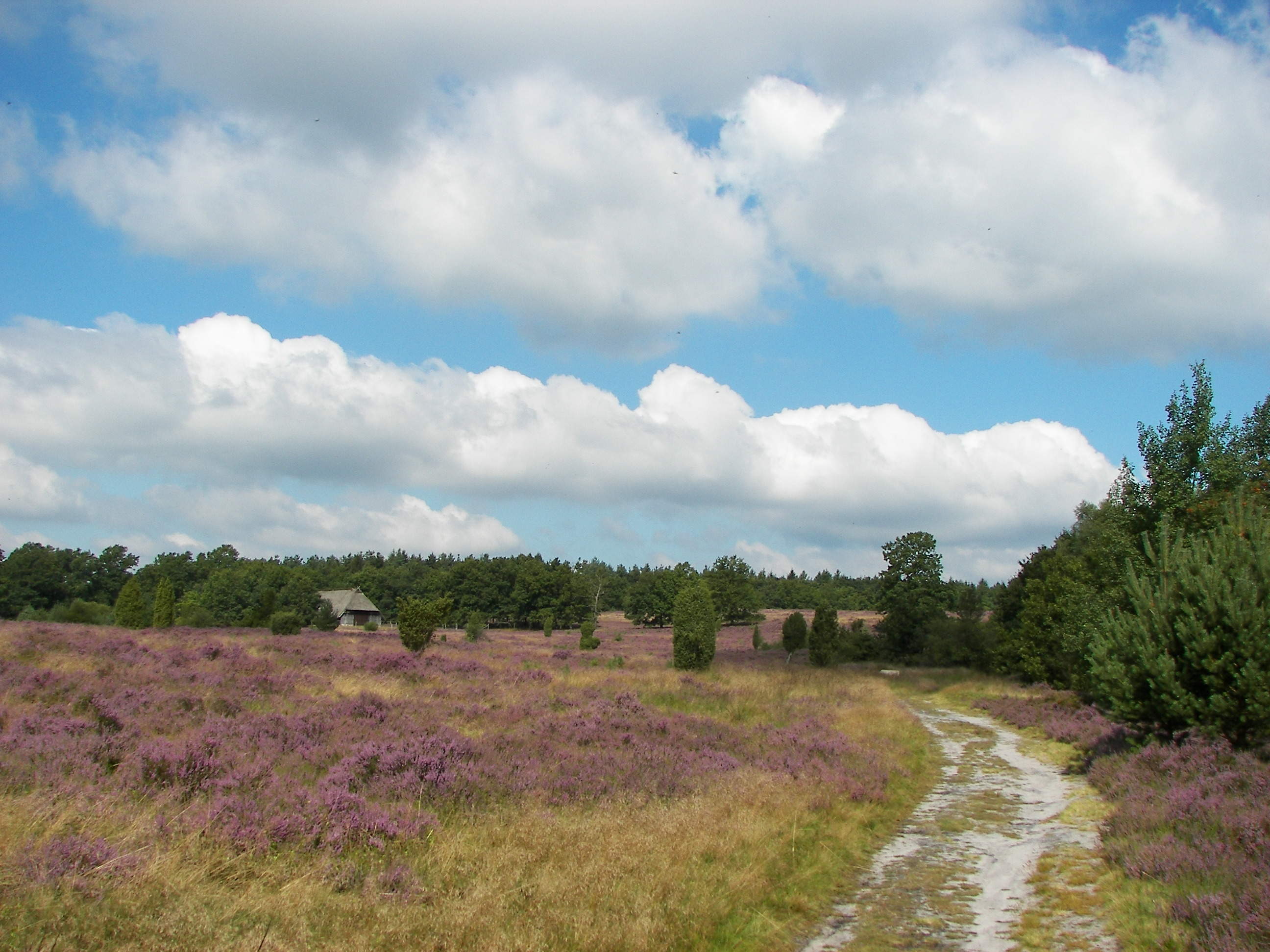
- Heathland near Niederhaverbeck
- Location: Lower Saxony
- Established: 1921/2 (core reserve)
- Administrator: Naturparkregion Lüneburger Heide e.V.

Lüneburg Heath Nature Park (German: Naturpark Lüneburger Heide) is a nature park, a form of protected environment, located in the Lüneburg Heath in northern Germany.

It has an area of 1,077.9 square kilometres (416.2 sq mi). The centre of the nature park is the Lüneburg Heath Nature Reserve with an area of 23,440 hectares (57,900 acres).

== Geography ==
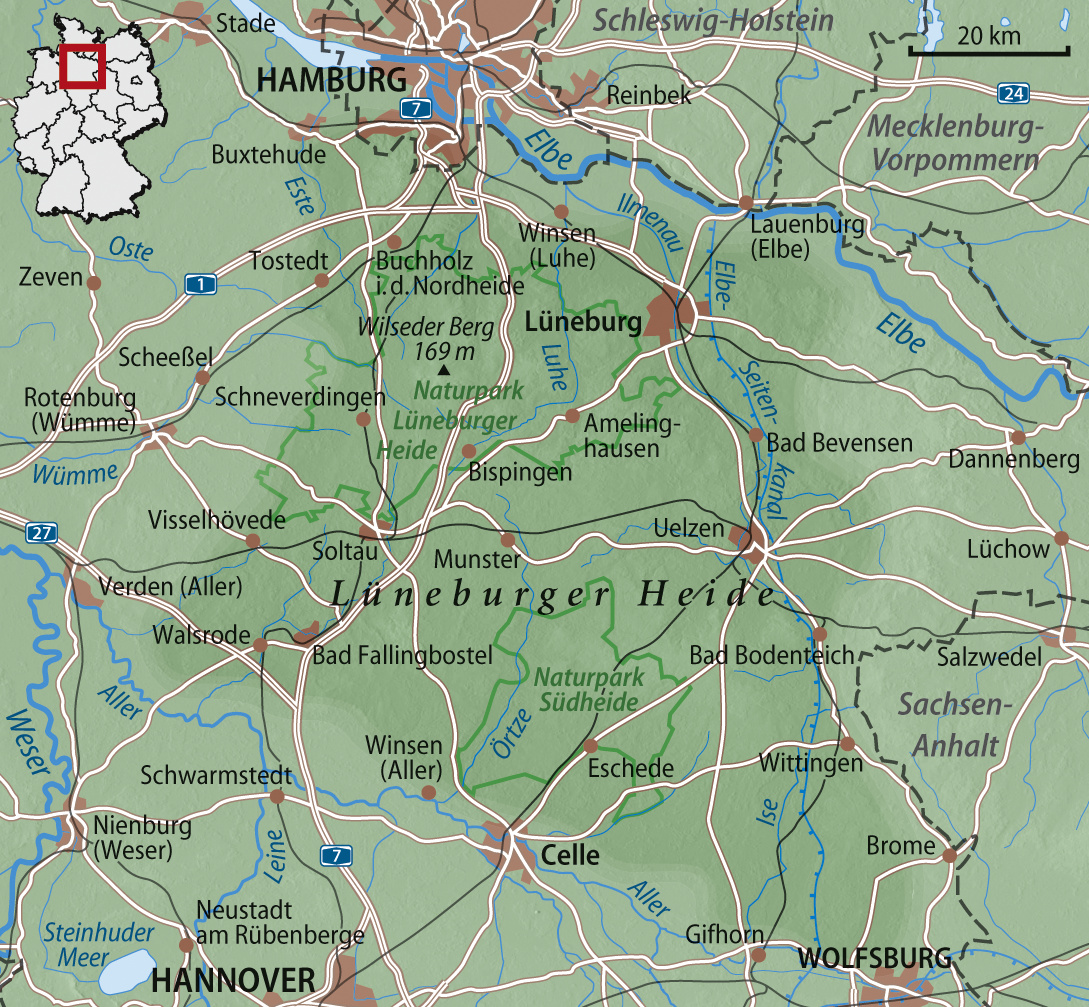
Map of Lüneburg Heath Nature Park

The nature park belongs to the former province (Regierungsbezirk) of Lüneburg and, after its expansion in 2007, extends into the districts of Harburg, Lüneburg and Heidekreis. The Lüneburg Heath Nature Park is bordered in the north by Buchholz, in the east by Lüneburg, in the south by Soltau and in the west by Neuenkirchen. It lies roughly 40 kilometres (25 mi) south of Hamburg, 70 km east of Bremen and 90 km north of Hanover. It was established as early as 1922, initially with 21,000 hectares (52,000 acres) of nature reserve. In 1993 this area was increased to 23,440 hectares (57,900 acres). By the beginning of 2007 the area of the nature reserve almost coincided with the area of the nature park. On 14 February 2007 the park was expanded to 107,792 hectares (266,360 acres). The areas added included various protected areas (Landschaftsschutzgebiete).

== Legal status ==
The park is one of 98 nature parks in Germany. They were established under section 22, paragraph 4 of the Federal Nature Conservation Act (BNatSchG). They comprise about 25% of the total land area of Germany and are linked by the Verband Deutscher Naturparke (Association of German Nature Parks).

Note that this is a separate category from the 14 Nationalparke (national parks) of Germany, under paragraph 24 of the Federal Nature Conservation Act. See List of national parks of Germany.

== Nature reserves ==
There are some 20 nature reserves (Naturschutzgebiete or NSGs) in the park.

NSGs with an area of more than 100 hectares are:

- Lüneburg Heath Nature Reserve 23,440 ha
- Upper Wümme Depression 1,415 ha
- Kiehnmoor 440 ha
- Upper Fintau valley 416 ha
- Valley of the Kleine Örtze 330 ha
- Schierbruch and Forellenbach valley 250 ha
- Brambostel Moor 105 ha

== Protected areas ==
There are more than 50 protected landscapes (Landschaftsschutzgebiete or LSGs) in the park.

LSGs with an area of more than 500 hectares are:

- Garlstorfer Wald and the surrounding area 10,383 ha
- Munster-Oerrel 3,476 ha
- Sottorfer Busch 2,589 ha
- Eichenhaine (The Schweineweide) 2,239 ha
- Schwindebeck 1,750 ha
- Rosengarten Kiekeberg Stuvenwald 973 ha
- Woods on the edge of the Raubkammer 824 ha
- Riensheide 759 ha
- Lohbergen 550 ha
- Klecker Wald 517 ha

== Natural monuments ==
- Glacial erratics, a "century stone" (Jahrhundertstein) near Soderstorf
- Lime trees, oaks, beech, Norway Spruce, Juniper, Myrica gale near Wesseloh, Holly near Soderstorf
- Deposited rocks (Wanderblöcke) at Heimbusch and near Egestorf (see glacial erratics)
- Source of the Schwindebach, a clay pit near Lieste and a "bottomless pit" near Soltau
- Schwalinger Flatt near Neuenkirchen (flat marshy lake from the ice age)

== See also ==
- List of nature parks in Germany
