= Snow Dome, Bispingen =

Indoor ski slope in Germany

Coordinates: 53°06′09″N 9°58′47″E

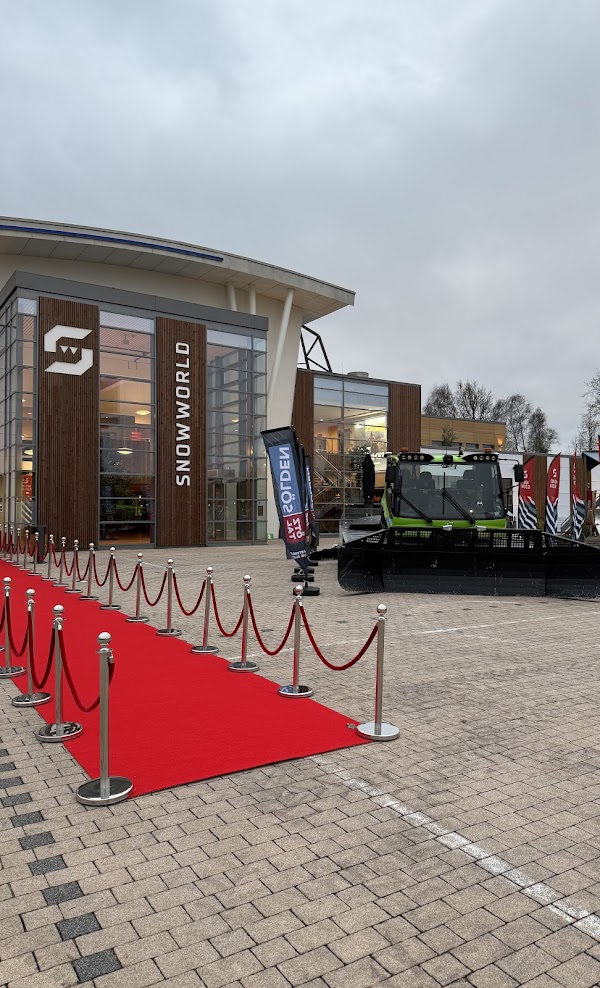
Opening of SnowWorld Bispingen

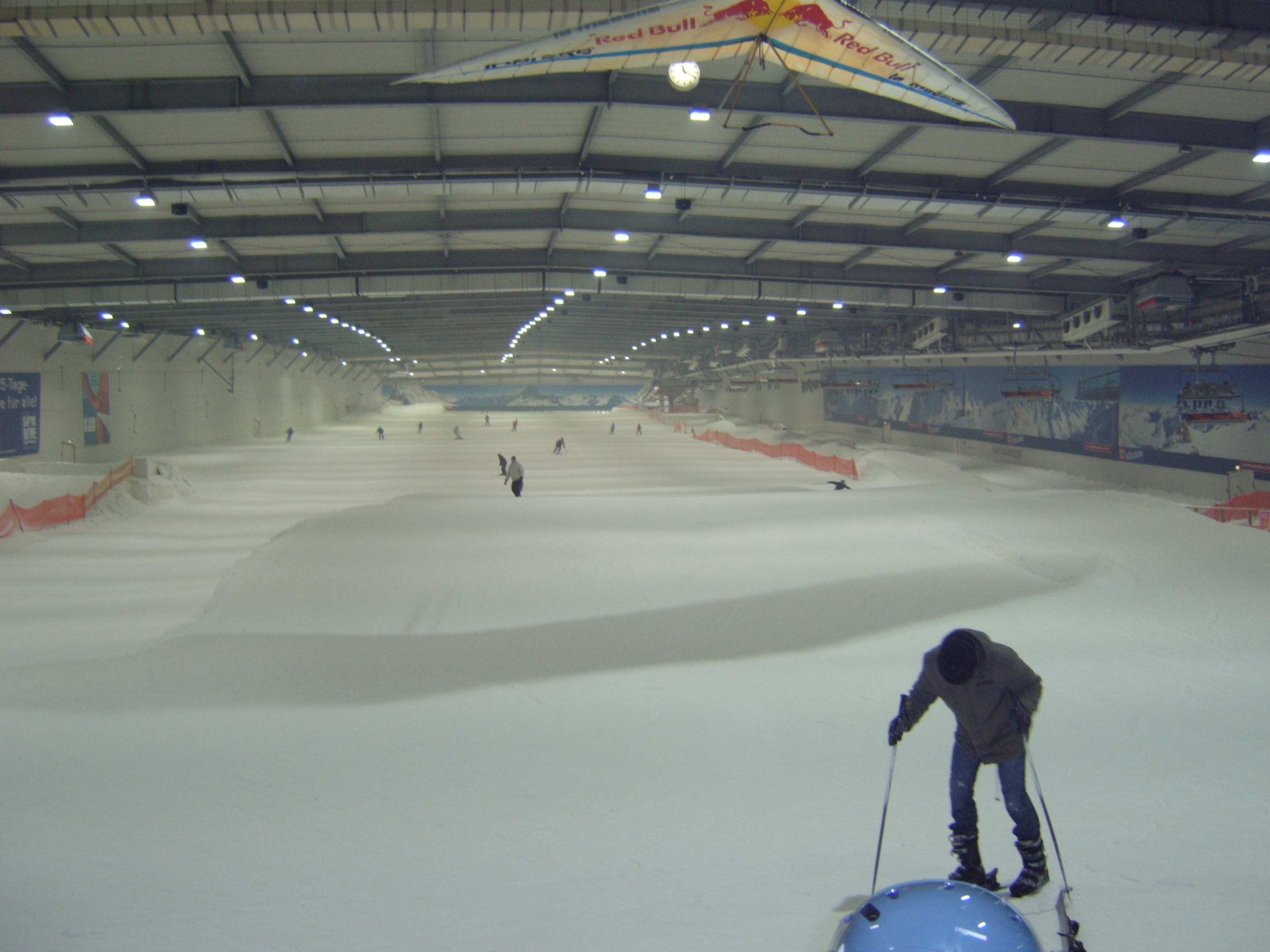
Piste

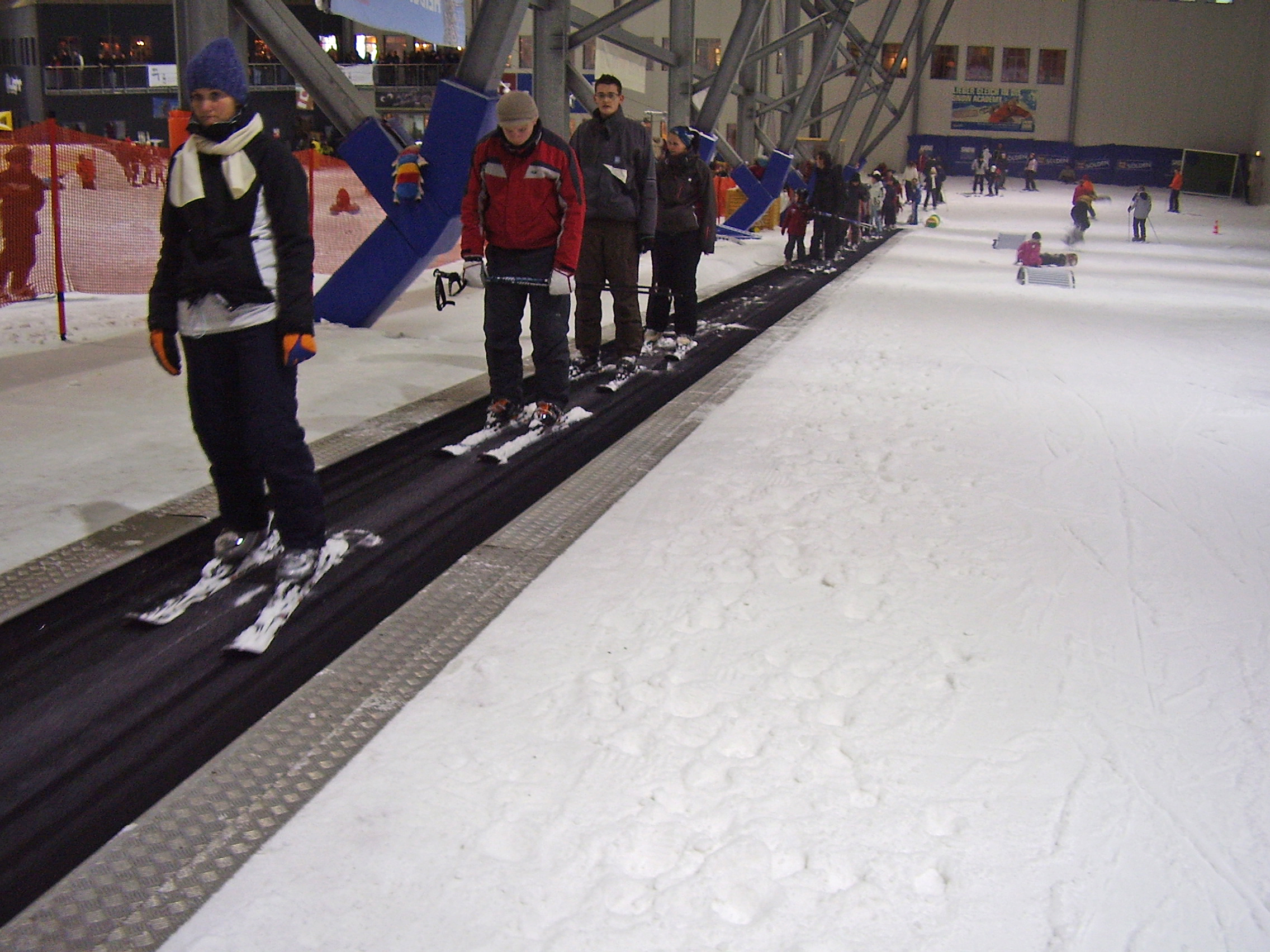
Beginner's slope with travelator

Snow World Bispingen (officially SnowWorld Bispingen, formerly Snow Dome Bispingen) is an indoor ski slope at Bispingen in the German state of Lower Saxony. It opened on 21 October 2006.

The piste has a length of about 300 m (984 ft), height about 78 m (256 ft), and a width of up to 100 m (328 ft). On the snow area of about 23,000 m^{2} (27,508 sq yd), in addition to the downhill piste is a Funpark, a toboggan run (Rodelbahn) and a beginner's slope. The incline varies between 20% at the top and 9% at the bottom.

There are two ski lifts in the hall: a button lift with a capacity of 1,600 passengers/hour and a chairlift with a capacity of 3,000 passengers/hour. There is also a magic carpet for the nursery slope.

The interior temperature of the hall, which is open all year round, is kept at a constant −2 to −4 °C (28.4 to 24.8 °F).

The Snow Dome was closed on 31 March 2013 and employees were given their notice. It reopened in November 2013 after much redevelopment work.

The SnowWorld Group took over the venue in November 2024, and the hall is now called SnowWorld Bispingen.
