= Hessisch Oldendorf =

- Town
- Coat of arms

- Location of Hessisch Oldendorf within Hameln-Pyrmont district
- Interactive map of Hessisch Oldendorf
- Location within Germany Location within Lower Saxony
- Coordinates: 52°10′N 9°15′E
- Country: Germany
- State: Lower Saxony
- District: Hameln-Pyrmont

Government
  - Mayor (2021–26): Tarik Oenelcin (CDU)

Area
  - Total: 120.32 km^{2} (46.46 sq mi)
- Elevation: 62 m (203 ft)

Population (2025-12-31)
  - Total: 18,352
  - Density: 152.53/km^{2} (395.04/sq mi)
- Time zone: UTC+01:00 (CET)
  - Summer (DST): UTC+02:00 (CEST)
- Postal codes: 31840 31833
- Dialling codes: 05152
- Vehicle registration: HM
- Website: www.hessisch-oldendorf.de

Hessisch Oldendorf (German pronunciation: [ˈhɛsɪʃ ˈʔɔldn̩dɔʁf]) is a town in the Hamelin-Pyrmont district, in Lower Saxony, Germany. It is situated on the river Weser, approximately 10 km (6 mi) northwest of Hamelin. The adjective "Hessisch" (lit. 'Hessian') has been used since 1905 to distinguish it from other towns named Oldendorf. Hessisch Oldendorf was part of Landgraviate of Hessen-Kassel from 1640 until 1932.

== Personalities ==
- Heinrich Beerbom (1892–1980), mayor, city manager and honorary citizen of Bramsche
- Wilhelm Beisner (1911–?), German SD and SS- Guide and arms dealer, agent
- Otto Deppmeyer (born 1947), politician (CDU), Member of Landtag
- Richard Krentzlin (1864–1956), died in Hessisch Oldendorf, piano teacher and composer
- Heinrich Krone (1895–1989), politician (Centre Party, CDU) Member of the Reichstag, Member of the Bundestag
- Ilske Laginges (–1558), the first victim of the Witch-hunt process
- Konrad Schlüsselburg (1543–1619), German Lutheran theologian
- Henrik Span (1634-1694), officer and Admiral in the Dutch, Venetian and Danish navies
- Gustav Süß (1823–1881), born in Rumbeck, painter and author of children's books
- Hans Peter Thul (born 1948), politician, (CDU) Member of Landtag and Bundestag
- Karl Ludwig August Heino von Münchausen (1759–1836) officer in the American Revolutionary War and poet
- Ludolph Münchausen (1570–1640), known as the scholar, collected at the time the largest and most famous library in Northern Germany
- Albert Wehrhahn (1848–1942), born in Oldendorf, school official in Hannover, a pioneer of the Special education, local historian, honorary citizen of Hessisch Oldendorf
- Ludwig Wessel (1879–1922), Protestant pastor of St. Nicolai Church in Berlin; father of Horst Wessel
