= Betzendorf =

- Municipality
- Coat of arms

- Location of Betzendorf within Lüneburg district
- Interactive map of Betzendorf
- Location within Germany Location within Lower Saxony
- Coordinates: 53°08′N 10°19′E
- Country: Germany
- State: Lower Saxony
- District: Lüneburg
- Municipal assoc.: Amelinghausen
- Subdivisions: 4

Government
  - Mayor: Carsten Müller

Area
  - Total: 32.71 km^{2} (12.63 sq mi)
- Elevation: 70 m (230 ft)

Population (2025-12-31)
  - Total: 1,093
  - Density: 33.41/km^{2} (86.54/sq mi)
- Time zone: UTC+01:00 (CET)
  - Summer (DST): UTC+02:00 (CEST)
- Postal codes: 21386
- Dialling codes: 04138
- Vehicle registration: LG

Betzendorf is a municipality in the district of Lüneburg, in Lower Saxony, Germany.
