= Lopausee =

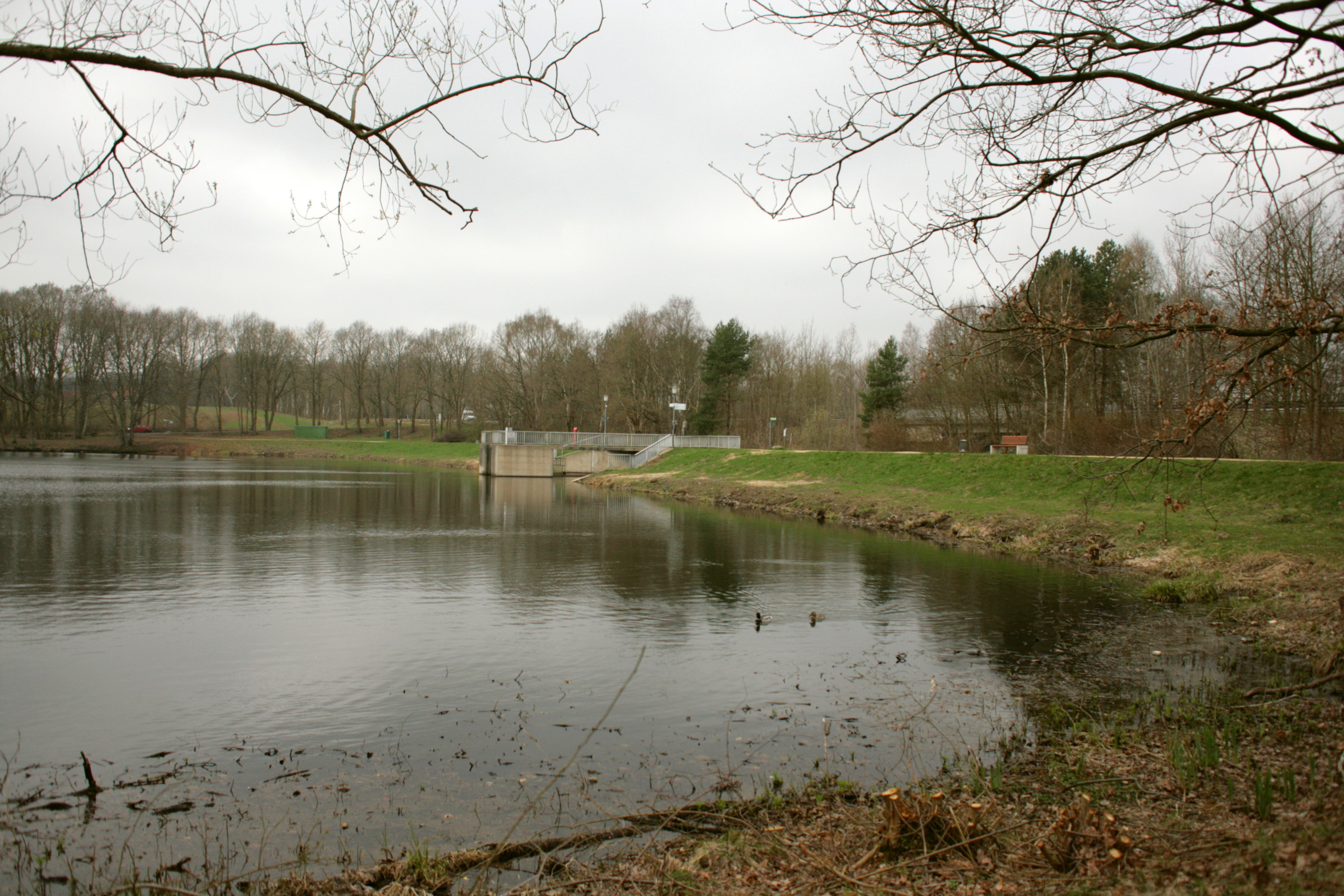
- The Lopausee in Amelinghausen
- Interactive map of Lopausee
- Location: Germany
- Coordinates: 53.131298°N 10.230074°E

Dam and spillways
- Impounds: Lopau
- Length: ca. 160 m (520 ft)

Reservoir
- Surface area: ca. 120,000 m^{2} (1,300,000 sq ft)
- Maximum length: ca. 800 m (2,600 ft)
- Maximum width: 100–180 m (330–590 ft)

The Lopausee is a man-made lake east of the village of Amelinghausen in Lüneburg Heath in North Germany. The lake has an area of about 12 hectares. It has been created in 1973 by impounding the River Lopau with a dam. The dam lies parallel to the road embankment of the B 209 federal road that runs past the lake.

The Lopausee is used exclusively as a nature reserve and for recreation. The water quality is rated as good and fishing and swimming are permitted. For the latter there is a bathing beach and a pontoon in the lake. Visitors can circumnavigate the lake on a roughly 2.2 km long footpath and cycleway. There is a restaurant on the lakeshore as well as a pedalo hire facility. For some time there has also been a ropes course by the lake. In the Lopaupark by the lake there is a children's playpark. Every year during the traditional Heath in Bloom Festival (Heideblütenfest) the lake is the stage for the big opening laser light show.
