= Stephan Bothe =

German politician (born 1984)

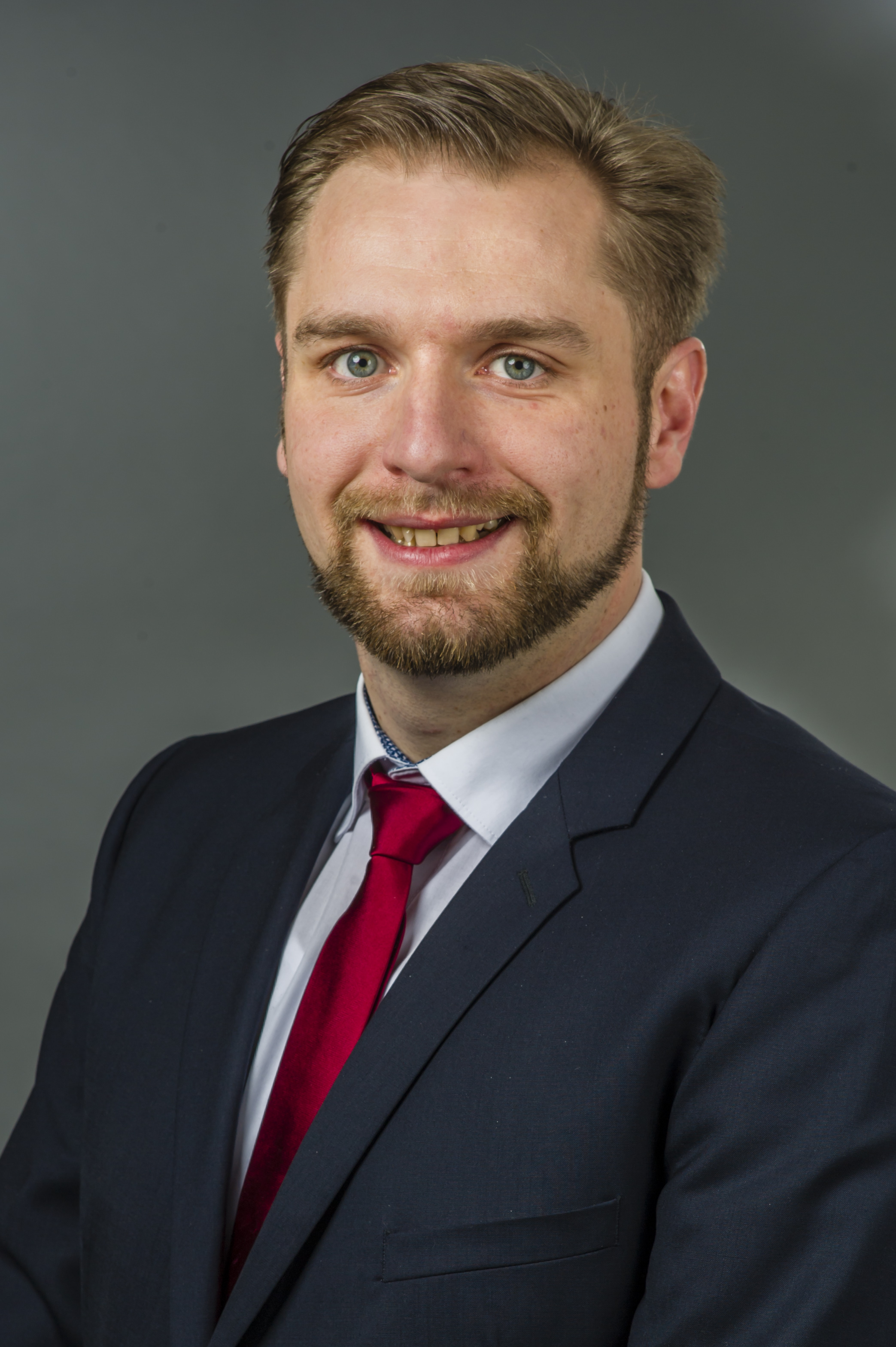
- Bothe in 2018

Member of the Landtag of Lower Saxony
- Incumbent
- Assumed office 14 November 2017

Personal details
- Born: 8 September 1984 (age 41) Munster
- Party: Alternative for Germany (since 2013)

Stephan Bothe (born 8 September 1984 in Munster) is a German politician serving as a member of the Landtag of Lower Saxony since 2017. He has served as chairman of the Alternative for Germany in Lüneburg since 2016.

== Private life ==
Stephan Bothe is the son of a non-commissioned officer of the Bundeswehr. After completing an apprenticeship as a carpenter and the subsequent civil service, Stephan Bothe trained as a geriatric nurse.

His ancestors belonged to the Yenish, which explains the persecution they suffered during the Nazi period.

Bothe is married and has two children.

== Political career ==
From 2006 to 2009, Bothe was a member of the Christian Democratic Union of Germany (CDU). In 2013, Bothe joined the AfD. On 15 October 2017, Bothe entered the Lower Saxony Landtag as a deputy for the AfD. His party had placed him second on the state list; he ran in constituency 49 in Lüneburg.

From September 2020 until the end of the legislative period in November 2022, he was a non-attached member of the Landtag.

In the 2022 Lower Saxony state election, Bothe once again entered the Landtag via the AfD’s regional list.

Bothe is regarded as a friend of Israel and a fighter against the growing antisemitism in Germany.

== Lawsuits initiated by Bothe ==
In 2024, Bothe attracted nationwide attention by demanding the disclosure of the first names of German nationals involved in assaults on emergency personnel during New Year’s Eve 2022/2023, in order to reveal their alleged migration background. However, the Lower Saxony State Court rejected Bothe’s lawsuit, stating that such disclosure could violate the legitimate interests of third parties.

In 2025, Stephan Bothe filed a lawsuit against the Oldenburg Police Directorate and achieved partial success before the Administrative Court. The court ruled that then police president Johann Kühme had violated the principles of neutrality and objectivity with certain statements about the AfD. Other statements by Kühme, however, were deemed permissible.

== Allegations against Bothe ==
In 2019, the public prosecutor’s office in Lüneburg investigated Bothe on suspicion of publicly using symbols of unconstitutional organizations. He was accused of being responsible for the so-called Abschiebär appearing on a Twitter account of the AfD district association of Lüneburg. The Abschiebär is a figure from propaganda videos of the far-right extremist group Besseres Hannover, which has been banned since 2012. In the same year, the investigation against Bothe was dropped.

In 2021, Stephan Bothe was accused of attempting to revive the far-right Flügel faction of the AfD in Lower Saxony. The AfD federal executive board subsequently filed for party expulsion proceedings against him; Bothe himself called the allegations baseless. Bothe participated in an AfD meeting in February, during which a secret reconstruction of Flügel structures bypassing the district associations was allegedly discussed. Bothe questioned the recorded audio document as evidence.

In 2021, the ban on holding office imposed on Bothe by the party was lifted again for formal reasons. A party expulsion procedure against Bothe failed.
