= Oldendorfer Totenstatt =

Dolmen

Coordinates: 53°8′47.0364″N 10°13′9.91″E

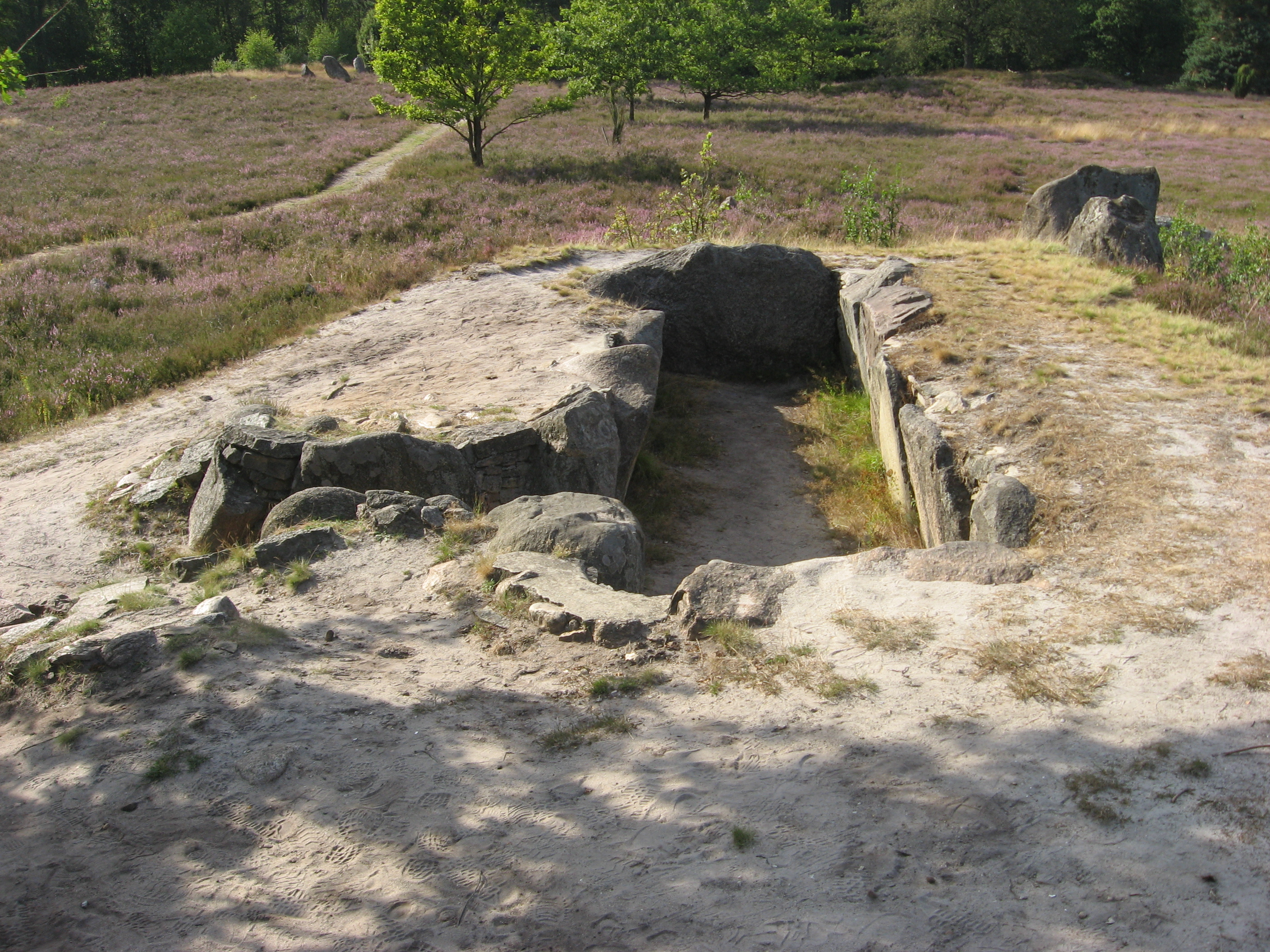
Chamber of site IV

The Oldendorfer Totenstatt is a group of six burial mounds and megalith sites in Oldendorf north of Amelinghausen in the valley of the River Luhe in Lüneburg district in the German state of Lower Saxony. It consists of dolmens (sites 1, 3 and 4) and tumuli (sites 2, 5 and 6).

== Sites 1, 3 and 4 ==
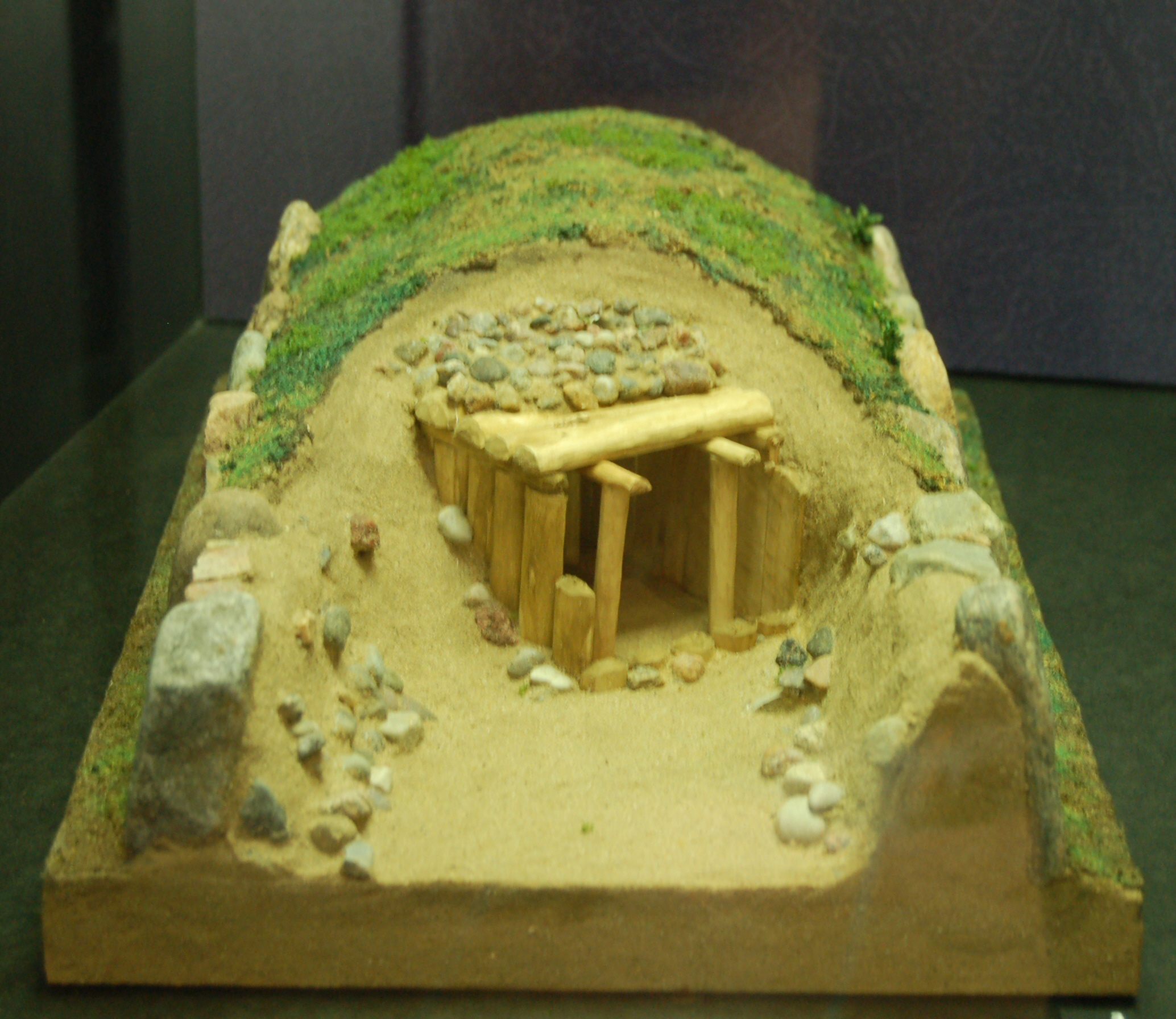
Model of Site III

- Site 1 is a 45 m-long (148 ft) dolmen, most of which has been destroyed.
- Site 3 is the remains of the earth embankment, still 43 m long. Most of its external stones are still there, either in situ or overturned. The chamber must have been located in the section that no longer exists.
- Site 4 is an 80 m-long (260 ft) dolmen. It originally had about 100 external stones, 14 of which are still in situ, the remainder were put back during its restoration (some with dry stone walling filling the gaps). The passage grave consisted of a roughly 8 m-long (26 ft) chamber with 12 upright supporting stones and a pair of passageway stones. The original five capstones of the chamber as well as the capstone for the passage are missing. The location of the chamber in the dolmen is right at the end, likewise the side entrance to the chamber is offset well to the end, so that the site is classified as one of the so-called Holsteiner Kammer ("Holstein Chamber") type.

== Sites 2, 5 and 6 ==
- Site 2 is a tumulus about 20 m in diameter in the centre of which the remains (the uprights and the joist (Schwellenstein)) of a passage grave are located.
- Sites 5 and 6 are Bronze Age tumuli.

== Finds ==
Inside the chamber of site 2 and 4 were found relicts of Funnelbeaker, Globular amphora, and Corded Ware cultures at different levels.

== Literature ==
Laux F.: Die Steingräber von Oldendorf an der Luhe In: Körner G. (ed.) Dokumentation zur Archäologie Niedersachsens in Denkmalpflege und Forschung, 1975
