= Oldendorf (Luhe) =

- Municipality
- Coat of arms

- Location of Oldendorf within Lüneburg district
- Interactive map of Oldendorf
- Location within Germany Location within Lower Saxony
- Coordinates: 53°09′N 10°13′E
- Country: Germany
- State: Lower Saxony
- District: Lüneburg
- Municipal assoc.: Amelinghausen
- Subdivisions: 4

Government
  - Mayor: Jürgen Rund

Area
  - Total: 32.93 km^{2} (12.71 sq mi)
- Elevation: 49 m (161 ft)

Population (2025-12-31)
  - Total: 936
  - Density: 28.4/km^{2} (73.6/sq mi)
- Time zone: UTC+01:00 (CET)
  - Summer (DST): UTC+02:00 (CEST)
- Postal codes: 21385
- Dialling codes: 04132
- Vehicle registration: LG
- Website: Webseite der Samtgemeinde

Oldendorf (Luhe) (German pronunciation: [ˈɔldn̩dɔʁf]) is a municipality in the district of Lüneburg, in Lower Saxony, Germany.

Nearby is an important neolithic gravesite, the Oldendorfer Totenstatt which has been well preserved.
