= Soderstorf =

- Municipality
- Coat of arms

- Location of Soderstorf within Lüneburg district
- Interactive map of Soderstorf
- Location within Germany Location within Lower Saxony
- Coordinates: 53°09′N 10°09′E
- Country: Germany
- State: Lower Saxony
- District: Lüneburg
- Municipal assoc.: Amelinghausen
- Subdivisions: 5

Government
  - Mayor: Roland Waltereit

Area
  - Total: 35.86 km^{2} (13.85 sq mi)
- Elevation: 53 m (174 ft)

Population (2025-12-31)
  - Total: 1,429
  - Density: 39.85/km^{2} (103.2/sq mi)
- Time zone: UTC+01:00 (CET)
  - Summer (DST): UTC+02:00 (CEST)
- Postal codes: 21388
- Dialling codes: 04132
- Vehicle registration: LG
- Website: Gemeinde Soderstorf

Soderstorf is a municipality in the district of Lüneburg, in Lower Saxony, Germany. Soderstorf has an area of 35.86 km^{2} and a population of 1,488 (as of December 31, 2007). A prehistoric cemetery called the Necropolis of Soderstorf is located near the town.
