= Rehlingen =

- Municipality
- Coat of arms

- Location of Rehlingen within Lüneburg district
- Interactive map of Rehlingen
- Location within Germany Location within Lower Saxony
- Coordinates: 53°06′N 10°13′E
- Country: Germany
- State: Lower Saxony
- District: Lüneburg
- Municipal assoc.: Amelinghausen
- Subdivisions: 5

Government
  - Mayor: Rainer Mühlhausen

Area
  - Total: 66.25 km^{2} (25.58 sq mi)
- Elevation: 86 m (282 ft)

Population (2025-12-31)
  - Total: 711
  - Density: 10.7/km^{2} (27.8/sq mi)
- Time zone: UTC+01:00 (CET)
  - Summer (DST): UTC+02:00 (CEST)
- Postal codes: 21385
- Dialling codes: 04132
- Vehicle registration: LG

Rehlingen (German pronunciation: [ˈʁeːlɪŋən]) is a municipality in the district of Lüneburg, in Lower Saxony, Germany.
