= Großes Moor (near Gifhorn) =

Bog area in Gifhorn district, Lower Saxony, Germany

Coordinates: 52°33′46″N 10°38′38″E

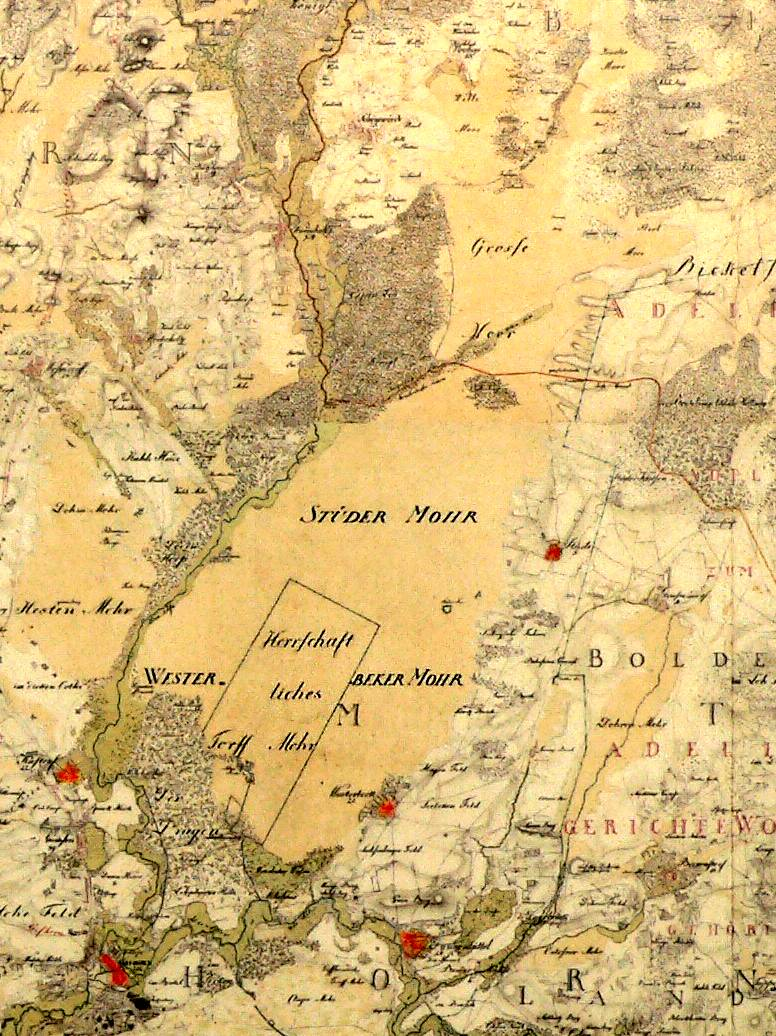
1780 map of the Großes Moor

The Großes Moor (literally "Great Bog") near Gifhorn is part of the Northwest German raised bog region, which stretches from the Netherlands to the eastern border of Lower Saxony on the sandy areas (geest) left behind by the ice age. The moor has a total area of about 6,100 hectares (15,000 acres), of which around 5,000 hectares (12,000 acres) are raised bog and some 1,100 hectares (2,700 acres) are fen. The peat layer is up to almost 6 metres (20 ft) thick in places. Individual parts of the moor have their own names like Stüder Moor, Hestenmoor or Weißes Moor.

== Location ==
The Großes Moor lies north of the town of Gifhorn. To the east it is bordered by the Elbe Lateral Canal. To the south is the village of Triangel, to the west the moor extends as far as Wesendorf. To the north is the village of Schönewörde. The former fen colony (Moorkolonie) of Neudorf-Platendorf extends from the south into the Großes Moor and its six-kilometre-long (3.7 mi) main street is the longest straight village high street in Lower Saxony.

== Use ==
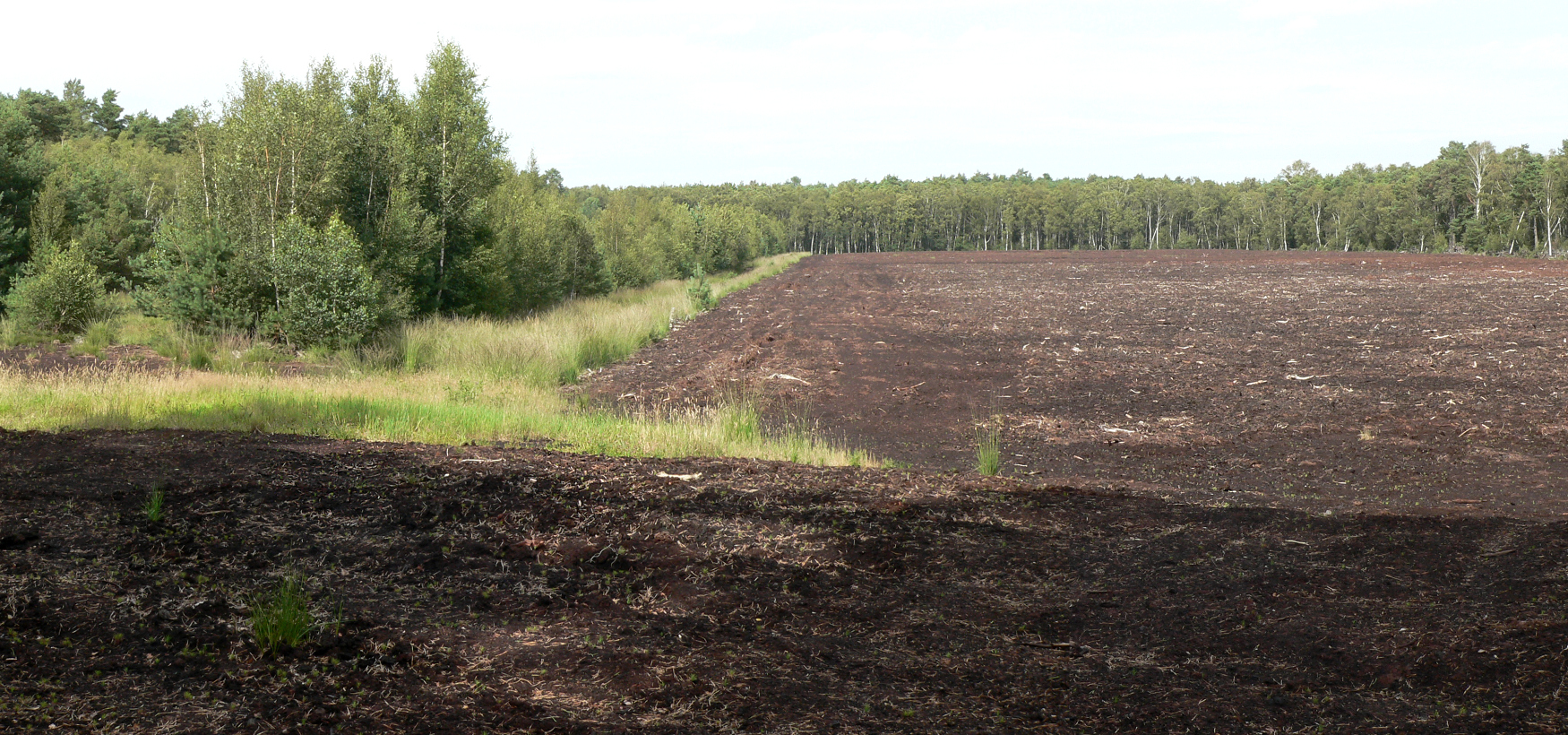
Peat cutting in the Großes Moor

Until the end of the 17th century only the areas around the edge of the moor were used as cattle meadows and for peat extraction. Until about 1870 the central and northern parts were left almost undisturbed. Later, work began on the construction of drainage canals and the industrial cutting of peat, which reached its zenith after 1945. In the 1960s there were about 14 peatworks, which extracted around 60,000 tonnes of fuel peat and 150,000 tonnes of fertiliser peat per annum. In Westerbeck (Gemeinde Sassenburg) there is only one peatworks left today that cuts peat on an industrial scale. In summer 2003, under the guidance of NABU, the Gifhorn district organisation began a large mammal pasture creation project. On an area of initially 30 hectares (74 acres) back-bredaurochs (ancient cattle) and Konik ponies (primitive Polish horses) have been settled. The existing grasslands were partly given over to grazing by Moorschnucke sheep and extensively mowed.

== Flora and fauna ==
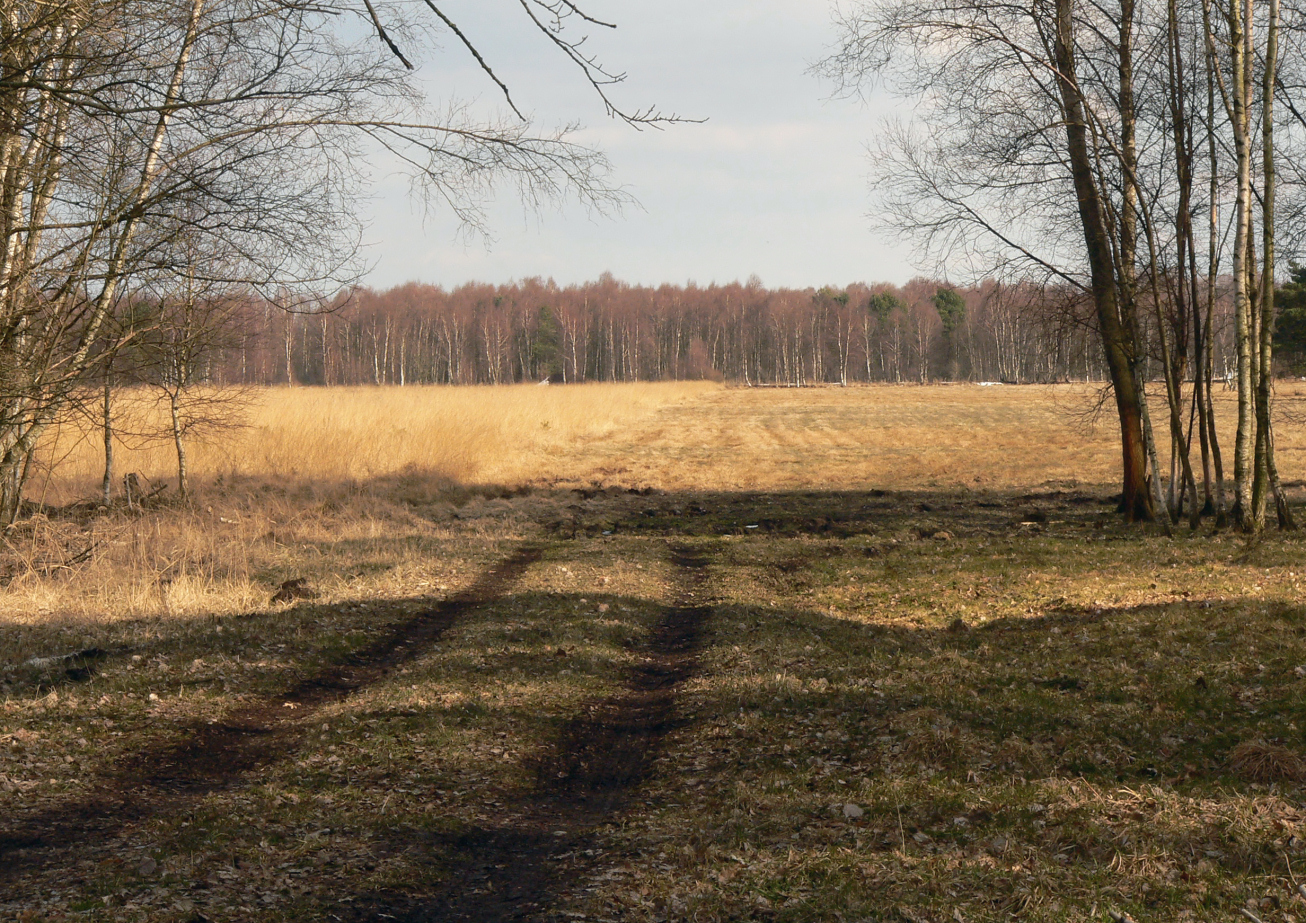
View towards the moor

In 1984 part of the region - an area of 2,720 hectares (6,700 acres) - was placed under conservation. It is one of the largest nature reserves in Lower Saxony. An area of 2,630 hectares (6,500 acres) has been designated for the protection of the white-faced darter as a special area of conservation; a further 2,617 hectares (6,470 acres) was designated as a Special Protection Area for birds. By stopping the artificial drainage a refuge for plants and animals that thrive in wet areas is being created. In addition the regeneration of raised bog is being encouraged. This has produced areas of moor grass, cross-leaved heath and cottongrass. In the Großes Moor there was once the great population of black grouse in Germany. In 1963 there were still 850 black grouse, in 1982 only 20 were left and since then they have become extinct in the area. In the Großes Moor there used to be around 150 animal species and 40 types of vascular plant, that are endangered in Lower Saxony of which eleven are threatened with extinction. These include the adder, crane, nightjar, woodlark, snipe, shrike and stonechat.

== Nature trails ==
Two nature trails start in Westerbeck, a village within the municipality of Sassenburg. These run outside the nature reserve in the southern part of the Großes Moor. One is a 12 km (7.5 mi) long cycle path and the other a 5 km (3.1 mi) long walking trail. The region can also be visited using the Moor Railway.

== 1975 forest fire catastrophe ==
On 8 August 1975 stubble burning near the village of Stüde got out of control. The fire spread very quickly and jumped over the Elbe Lateral Canal, thus setting the Großes Moor on fire. On the first day of the fire a fire engine was overwhelmed by a rolling barrage near Neudorf-Platendorf. Two firefighters suffered serious burns. At the same time other fires broke out on the Lüneburg Heath, which led to a fire disaster and became known in the national news as the "fire on the Lüneburg Heath". Not until 9 days later, on 17 August 1975, was the fire in the forests finally extinguished. The peat fire on the Großes Moor continued to smoulder underground for weeks afterwards.

== Gallery ==
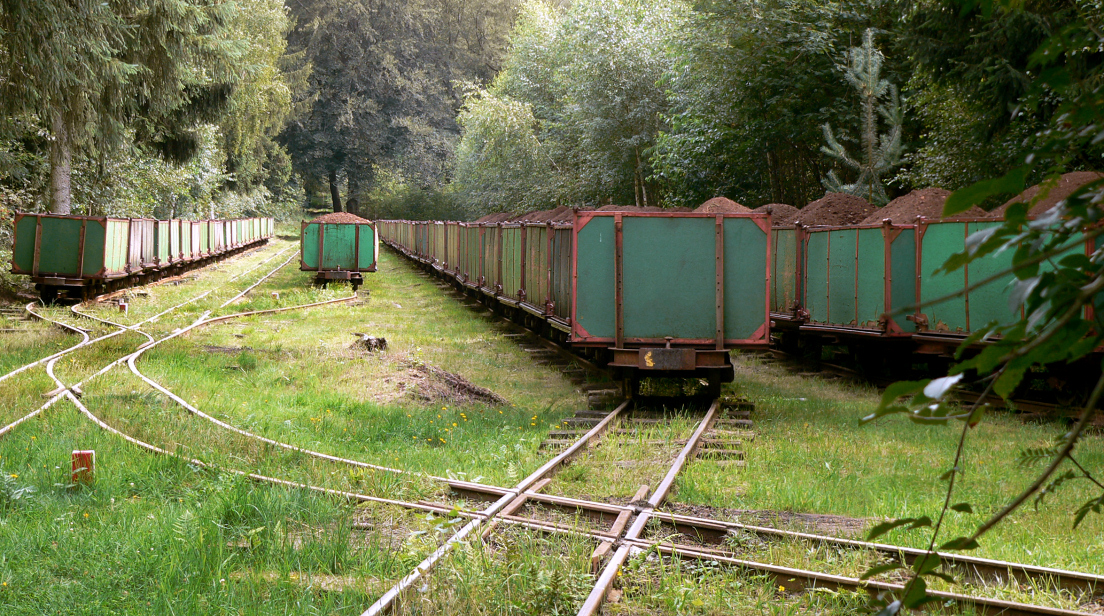
Peat-laden moor railway trucks near Westerbeck

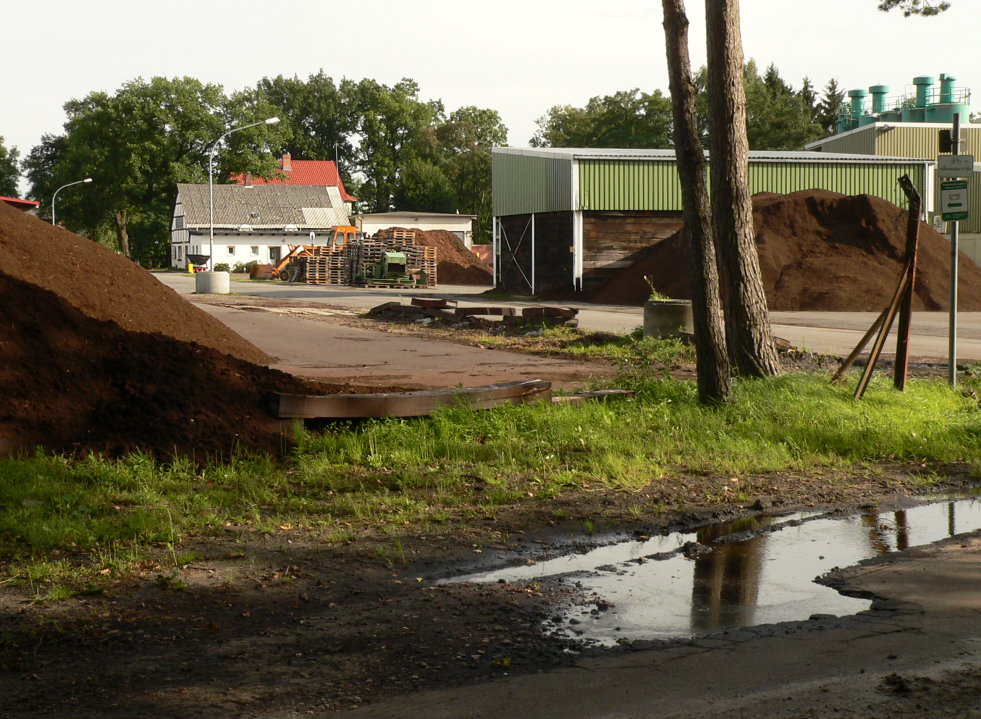
Peat working operation in Westerbeck on the edge of the Großes Moor

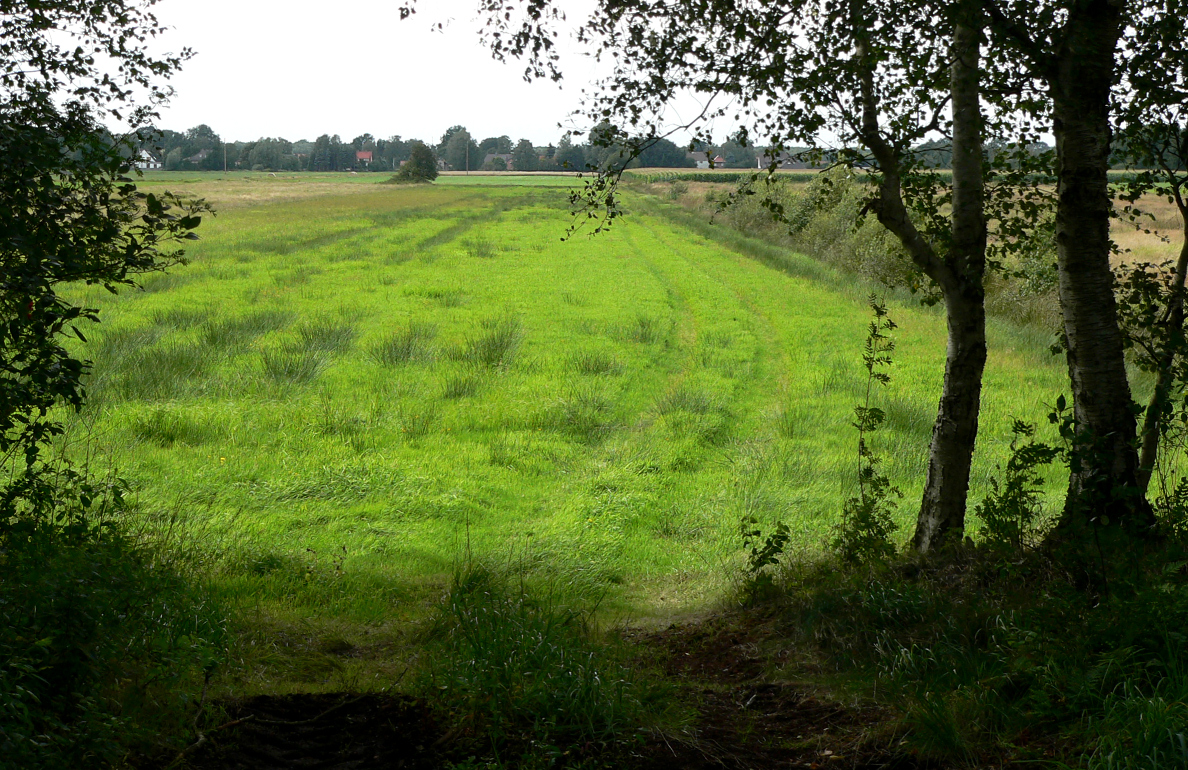
Area from which peat was cut; today pastureland. Background: Neudorf-Platendorf

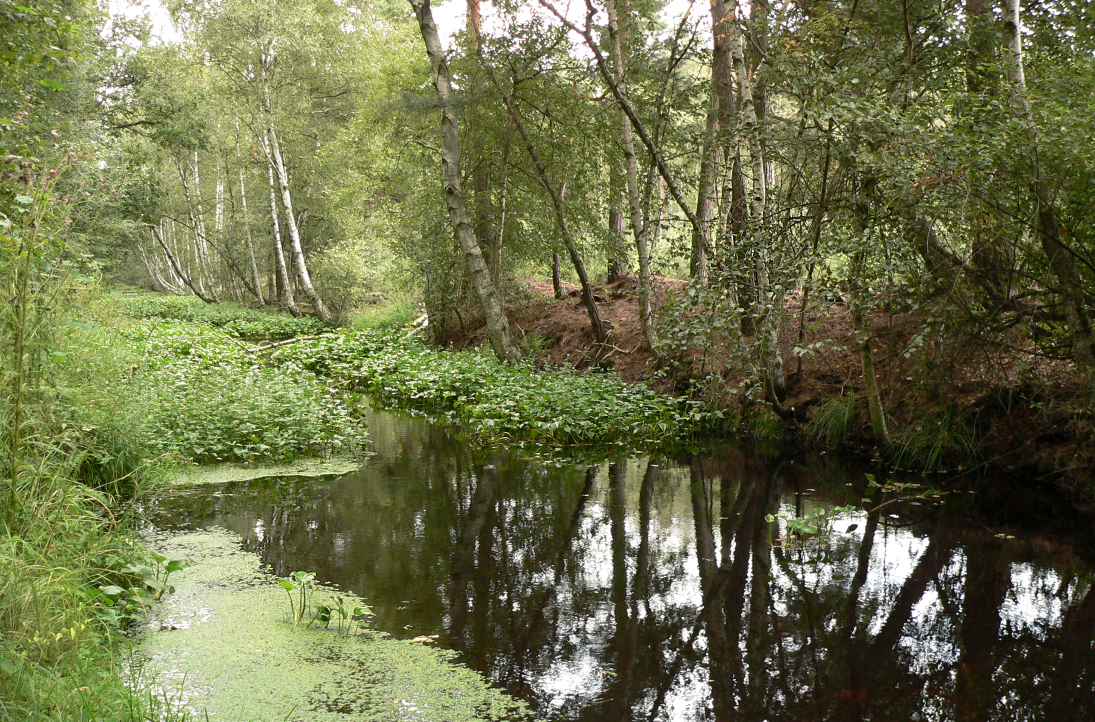
Drainage ditches in the moor

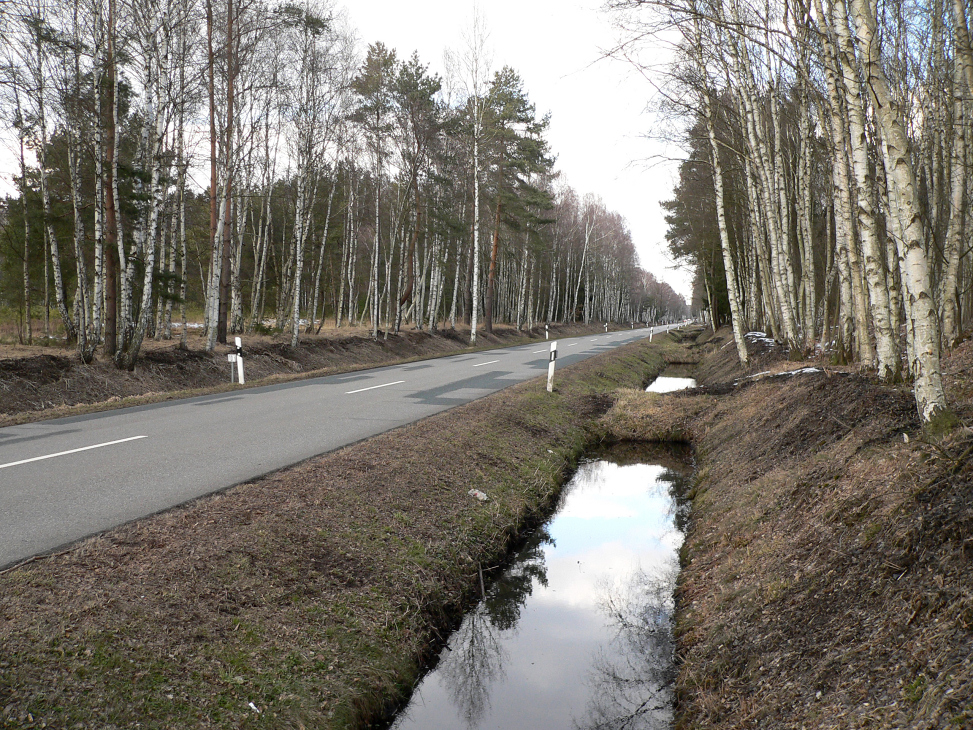
Road through the moor

== Literature ==
- Höhn, Gerhard: Europäische Arbeitstagung: Birkwildschutz heute. Perspektiven für den nachhaltigen Schutz des Birkwilds in mitteleuropäischen Lebensräumen./ Wild u. Hund, No. 13, 42-46, Nassau.
- Herbold, Detlev: Von der Vision über die Idee zum Projekt. Nds. Jäger 11, 46-47, Hanover.
- Niedersächsisches Landesamt für Ökologie -Abteilung Naturschutz-: Schutz, Pflege und Entwicklung des Grünlandes in Niedersachsen. Effizienz der Maßnahmen des Naturschutzes. [Vervielf. maschr. Ms.], 177 pp., 17 ill., 29 tab., [Hildesheim].
- Fischer, Mathias: Zur Heuschreckenfauna (Insecta: Saltatoria) im Großen Moor bei Gifhorn (SO-Niedersachsen). Braunschw. Naturkundl. Schrr. 6, H. 2, 281-291, 2 ill., 1 tab., Brunswick.
- Koch, J.; Wehner, H.: Polyzyklische Aromatische Kohlenwasserstoffe (PAK) in Torfen: Mikroskopische, brennstoffchemische und chromatographische Untersuchungen an einem Torfprofil aus dem Großen Moor Gifhorn, TK 3429 Wesendorf./ [Vervielf. maschr. Ms., o. S.], BGR, Hanover.
- Melter, Johannes; Schreiber, Matthias: Wichtige Brut- und Rastvogelgebiete in Niedersachsen. Eine kommentierte Gebiets- und Artenliste als Grundlage für die Umsetzung der Europäischen Vogelschutzrichtlinie. Vogelkdl. Berr. Nieders., Vol. 32, Spec. edn., 320 pp., 9 ill., 6 tab., Goslar.
- Oldekop, Werner; Melchert, Friedmund; Hermenau, Bernd: 50 Jahre Limikolenbeobachtung in der Umgebung Braunschweigs. Milvus Braunschweig 19, 1-35, 38 Abb., Brunswick.
- Hermenau, Bernd; Velten, Peter: Bestandsschätzung ausgewählter Brutvogelarten im NSG "Großes Moor" bei Gifhorn in den Jahren 1994 bis 2001. Milvus Brunswick 20, 7-17, 5 ill., Brunswick.
