= Paul Ernst Gesellschaft =

German literary circle

The Paul-Ernst-Gesellschaft is a registered association dedicated to the cataloguing and preservation of the literary works of Paul Ernst (1866–1933). The society was founded directly after Ernst's death in 1933 and re-founded after the Second World War in 1956. It is recognised as worthy of cultural and scientific support and open to natural persons and corporations.

== Aims and Objectives ==
The society aims to contribute to the preservation and publication of Ernst's literary estate, to promote performances of his dramas, to initiate publications focusing on his person or his work and symposia with readings and lectures, and to contribute to the preservation of memorials to Paul Ernst. For these purposes, the Paul Ernst Archive is to be successively expanded and used, which is located at the Universitätsbibliothek Regensburg (Paul-Ernst-Archive/Collection Kutzbach), at the Ruhr University Bochum (Privatbibliothek Paul Ernst) and at the Deutsches Literaturarchiv Marbach (estate) exists.

== History ==
The literary society was founded in July 1933, just two months after the death of Paul Ernst. The founding circle was largely made up of friends, patrons and students of the poet, who subsequently issued a large number of publications and organised numerous events. Paul Ernst's widow Else Ernst (1874–1946) participated in readings from her late husband's work. She influenced the development of the Society, for example by operating the 1942 transfer of the Society's headquarters to Graz.

Karl August Kutzbach (1903–1992), friend and executor of Paul Ernst's estate, became an important figure in the association who researched extensively and throughout his life on his person and work. He wrote most of the older research literature on Paul Ernst. He contributed significantly to the continued existence of the society alongside his niece, the doctor and art collector Hildegard Blanke (born 1938), and Heinrich Steinmeyer (1908–2001), both of whom served as directors.

== Publications ==
In irregular succession, newsletters and the magazine "Der Wille zur Form" have been published. Furthermore, annual gifts were published for the members.

== Presidents ==
- 1933–1941: Will Vesper (1882–1962).
- 1941–1942: Interregnum, provisionally by Vice-President Max Wachler (1878–1960).
- 1942–1945: Karl Polheim (1883–1967)
- 1956–1966: Pastor Georg Noth (1890–1966).
- 1966–1978: Pastor Karl Vogel (1911–2000).
- 1978–1989: Wolfgang Stroedel (1910–1997).
- 1989–1996: Louis Ferdinand Helbig (1935–2019).
- 1996–2012: Horst Thomé (1947–2012).
- since 2012: Marco Bastianelli (born 1976).

== Well-known members ==
- Hermann Apelt (1876–1960), jurist, politician, senator of the Free Hanseatic City of Bremen.
- Hans Ludwig von Arnim (1889–1971), church functionary, politician and author.
- Helmut Bartuschek (1905–1984), poet and translator of French literature.
- Hans Bogner (1895–1948), classical philologist.
- Joseph Breitbach (1903–1980), writer and publicist.
- Hildegard Châtellier (1936–2014), university professor and author.
- Eberhard Clemen (1910–1996), lyricist and language teacher
- Ottomar Enking (1867–1945), writer
- Herbert G. Göpfert (1907–2007), publishing bookseller, editor and honorary professor.
- Günter Hartung (born 1932), Germanist, literary scholar, university professor and author.
- Wolfgang Heilmann (1913–1992), philosopher and university lecturer.
- Louis Ferdinand Helbig (1935–2019), Germanist and literary scholar.
- Karl Herke (1889–1965), philosopher, literary scholar, writer and visual artist.
- Curt Hotzel (1894–1967), writer, journalist and publicist.
- Hans-Windekilde Jannasch (1883–1981), educator and writer.
- Paul Anton Keller (1907–1976), writer.
- Martin Kießig (1907–1994), educator, literary critic, author and publicist.
- Joachim Konrad (1903–1979), Lutheran pastor and professor of theology.
- Julius Albert Kühn (1887–1970), teacher, writer and literary historian.
- Carl Heinz Kurz (1920–1993), teacher, writer and publicist.
- Karl August Kutzbach (1903–1992), private scholar, publicist, dean of Paul Ernst research.
- Rudolf Lange (1914–2007), educator, journalist, theatre critic, writer and publicist.
- Norbert Langer (1899–1975), literary historian and publicist.
- Arthur Luther (1876–1955), literary scholar, librarian, translator and interpreter.
- Ernst Metelmann (1901–1981), writer, proofreader and editor.
- Eberhard Wolfgang Möller (1906–1972), writer and playwright.
- Kurt Oxenius (1881–1950), paediatrician, writer and bibliophile, co-founder of the Society of Friends of Books in Chemnitz in 1921.
- Karl Polheim (1883–1967), Germanist, literary scholar, university professor and rector.
- Karl Konrad Polheim (1927–2004), literary scholar.
- Adolf Potthoff (1897–1969), journalist, educator and writer.
- Herbert Reinecker (1914–2007), journalist and author.
- Paul Rilla (1896–1954), journalist and literary scholar.
- Helmut Schoepke (1903–1996), poet and publisher.
- Rolf Schroers (1919–1981), writer.
- Gerhard Schumann (1911–1995), writer.
- Heribert Schwarzbauer (1922–2009), writer, literary and art critic.
- Albert Soergel (1880–1958), literary historian.
- Werner Sombart (1863–1941), sociologist and economist, university professor.
- Curt Stefke (1894–1943), painter and draughtsman.
- Eberhard Ter-Nedden (1908–1986), theologian, philologist, translator and university professor
- Will Vesper (1882–1962), writer and literary critic.
- Walther Vogel (1880–1938), historian and university professor.
- August Winnig (1878–1956), trade unionist, politician and writer.
- Max Zweig (1892–1992), playwright.

== Memberships ==
- Arbeitsgemeinschaft Literarischer Gesellschaften und Gedenkstätten
