= Westerbeck =

Westerbeck may refer to several places:

== In Lower Saxony ==
- Westerbeck (Ebersdorf), a village in Ebersdorf, Lower Saxony
- Westerbeck (Osterholz-Scharmbeck), a village in Osterholz-Scharmbeck
- Westerbeck (Sassenburg), a village in Sassenburg

== In North Rhine-Westphalia ==
- Westerbeck (Lienen), a village in Lienen
- Westerbeck (Westerkappeln), a village in Westerkappeln
