= Sassenburg-Triangel =

Triangel
- Ortsteil of Sassenburg
- Interactive map of Triangel
- Location within Germany Location within Lower Saxony
- Coordinates: 52°30′N 10°35′E
- Country: Germany
- State: Lower Saxony
- District: Gifhorn
- Municipality: Sassenburg
- Elevation: 54 m (177 ft)

Population (2021)
  - Total: 2,031
- Time zone: UTC+01:00 (CET)
  - Summer (DST): UTC+02:00 (CEST)
- Postal codes: 38524
- Dialling codes: 05371

Triangel is a village in the municipality of Sassenburg in the Lower Saxon district of Gifhorn. The word means “triangle” in German. The name is derived from the original shape of the village estate.

== Geography ==
=== Geographical location ===
The village of Triangel lies east of the river Ise and the state forest of Dragen and north of the river Aller. To the north and east its land transitions in a narrow strip into the Großes Moor.

=== Neighbouring settlements ===
The nearest settlements are the Sassenburg village of Neudorf-Platendorf to the north, Westerbeck to the east, the town of Gifhorn to the south and the Gifhorn suburb of Gamsen to the west. The nearest cities are Wolfsburg to the east and Brunswick to the south.

== History ==
=== Foundation ===
It was first mentioned officially in 1796 as Auf dem Triangel and initially belonged to the old municipality of Neudorf-Platendorf, from which it became independent in the 19th century.

=== Points of interest ===
Points of interest in Triangel include the Gutspark, in which there are hundreds of rhododendrons and the manor house (Herrenhaus) built in the style of an English country house, which today houses a branch of the Diakonisches Werk, a nationwide Christian charity.

The station opened in 1894 by the Prussian state railways on the line from Brunswick to Uelzen) was once an imposing building. It has however been in private ownership for a long time and has been heavily modified.

=== Current administrative structure ===
Since 1974 Triangel has belonged to the municipality of Sassenburg.

== Politics ==
=== Council ===
The council is an advisory body which is part of the political structure of Sassenburg. Councillors are expected, however, to hear all issues affecting the village, although the final decision over any measure resides with the Sassenburg council. The following parties are represented on the council:

- SPD 3 seats
- CDU 2 seats

Following the local election in 2006 the SPD stepped down in favour of the CDU after more than 30 years as the strongest party in Triangel.

=== Council Chair ===
In 2006 SPD member, Beate Morgenstern-Ostlender took over chairmanship of the council from Dieter Fuhrmann (CDU). Previously Morgenstern-Ostlender was the deputy chairman. Following Morgenstern-Ostlender's election as chairman, SPD politician Friederike Wolff von der Sahl has been elected as deputy.

== Personalities ==
- Will Vesper (1882–1962), German author and literary critic, also known for his Nazi propaganda
- Bernward Vesper (1939–1971), son of Will Vesper and German author, known for his contacts with the RAF

== Sources ==
- Der Landkreis Gifhorn. Die Landkreise in Gifhorn, Bd. 26. Hrsg. von Niedersächsischen Landesverwaltungsamt, Bremen 1972, ISBN 3-87172-327-4.
- Bernward Vesper: Die Reise. (novel, manuscript completed in 1971)
