= Triangel =

Triangel may refer to:

- Sassenburg-Triangel, a village near Gifhorn, Lower Saxony, Germany
- Triangel (vehicle manufacturer), a Danish vehicle manufacturer
- Swedish spelling of triangle, the geometric shape
- German for Triangle (musical instrument)
