= Helmut Bartuschek =

German writer and poet

Helmut Bartuschek (25 December 1905 – 18 May 1984) was a German poet and translator of French literature.

== Life ==
Born Gliwice/Oberschlesien, Bartuschek moved to Leipzig in 1922, where he passed the Abitur in 1925 and studied Romance languages and literature, art history, philosophy and librarianship. In 1940, he was drafted for military service. After his release from French captivity (1944-1948) he lived in Leipzig again.

Bartuschek made his debut with poems in 1929 in an anthology edited by Klaus Mann. His first own volume of poetry was promoted by Georg Maurer.

Bartuschek died in Leipzig at the age of 74.

== Work ==
=== Poetry ===
- Erde, Leipzig 1938
- Verwandelte Welt, Berlin 1962
- Die Häutung des Schlangenkönigs, Leipzig 1983 (ed. Roland Erb).
- Waldamtmann, 2016, ISBN 3-944064-98-4.

=== Translations ===
- Guy de Maupassant, Fettklößchen, Erzählungen 1950
- Guy de Maupassant, Eine Landpartie, 1965
- Guy de Maupassant, Pariser Abenteuer (with K. Friese), 1964
- Guy de Maupassant, Meisternovellen, 3 volumes, 1984
- Guy de Maupassant, Die lieben Verwandten und andere heitere Erzählungen, 1952
- Guy de Maupassant, Das Brot der Sünde, 1960
- Guy de Maupassant, Unter dem Siegel der Verschwiegenheit, 1961
- P. Arene, Carmantras Ende, 1952
- Der gallische Hahn, französische Gedichte von der Zeit der troubadors bis in unsere Tage in deutscher Nachdichtung. 1957
- Victor Hugo, Die schwarze Fahne, 1962
- Victor Hugo, Die schwarze Fahne, 1988
- Charles de Coster, Flämische Mähren, 1963
- Gustave Flaubert, November, 1984
- Gustave Flaubert, Leidenschaft und Tugend, 1988
- Prosper Mérimée, Auserlesene Novellen, 1951
- Prosper Mérimée, Colomba, 1990.

== Prizes ==
- Literaturpreis der Stadt Leipzig 1938
- Kunstpreis der Stadt Leipzig, 1980.

== Membership ==
- Paul Ernst Gesellschaft
