= Fire on the Lüneburg Heath =

Forest fire in Germany

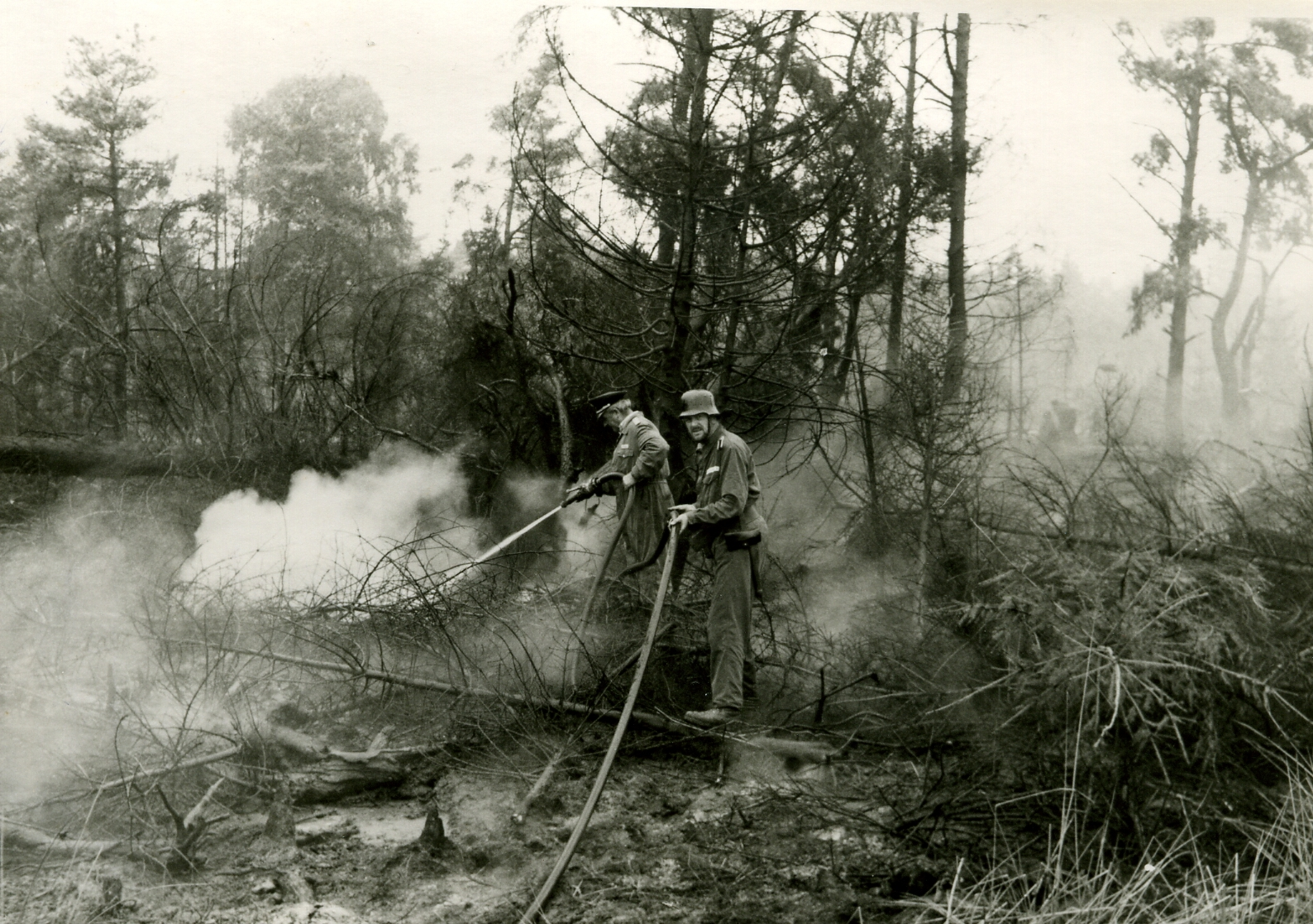
- Firemen fighting the forest fire near Eschede
- Date: 8 August 1975 – 18 August 1975
- Location: Lüneburg Heath, West Germany

Statistics
- Burned area: 7,418 ha (18,330 acres)

The fire on the Lüneburg Heath was a major forest fire in 1975 on the southern part of the Lüneburg Heath in west Germany, with various points of origin near Gifhorn, Eschede and Meinersen. To this day, it is the largest known forest fire in the Federal Republic of Germany.

== Causes ==
The fire was aided by a long period of drought with hot summer weather and dried-out coniferous forests. Additionally, there was a lot of storm-damaged wood left in the wake of Hurricane Quimburga on 13 November 1972 that had not been cleared. The sources of the fire could only be reached with difficulty by the fire services over the unmetalled forest and heath tracks. Assisted by the monoculture of the area with its uniform stands of pines, the fire was able to spread rapidly and developed into a giant forest fire in parts of the districts of Gifhorn and Celle.

The actual cause of the fire was only clarified in a few cases. At one place it was reckoned that the fire was started by sparks from the railway, in other places by carelessness or arson.

== Chronology of the disaster ==
On 8 August 1975 a heath fire near the village of Stüde on the Südheide got out of control. The fire quickly spread and jumped across the Elbe Lateral Canal. In addition to the forest and bog fires between Stüde and Neudorf-Platendorf further fires broke out in the next few days in the districts of Gifhorn and Celle in the area of the Südheide Nature Park, which were only extinguished with difficulty. Plumes of smoke rose up to four kilometres high above the heath.

- On the first day of the fire, the 8 August, a fire engine near Neudorf-Platendorf was rolled by the rolling barrage (Feuerwalze), two firemen sustaining serious burns. On the same day the Gifhorn district fire chief died of heart failure during a callout.
- One of the sources of the fire in Celle district originated on 9 August 1975 at 12:50 hours from a fire in the Unterlüß/Schmarbeck area.
- On 10 August at 12:30 hours between Eschede and Oldendorf near the village of Queloh (Eschede municipality) a forest fire was reported. The fire quickly spread through the pine monocultures.
- On 10 August a new forest blaze started near Meinersen which spread towards the village. After the fire was halted shortly before the village, the wind suddenly veered and blew the 20-metre-high (66 ft) flames in a new direction. As a result, a water tender of the Volunteer Fire Service was cut off. Five firefighters from Fallersleben and Hohenhameln died in the wall of fire.
- On 10 August the Lüneburg Regierungspräsident declared a state of emergency.
- On 12 August 1975 at 11:55 another large fire broke out near Gorleben (Lüchow-Dannenberg), that destroyed 2,000 hectares (4,900 acres) of forest and farmland by 22:00 hours. This fire was put out by the end of the day, however.
- On 17 August 1975 all the fires were finally extinguished. The fire disaster had been in the news and on radio and television across Germany for a week.
- On 18 August 1975 the disaster warning was ended.

== Fire fighting operation ==
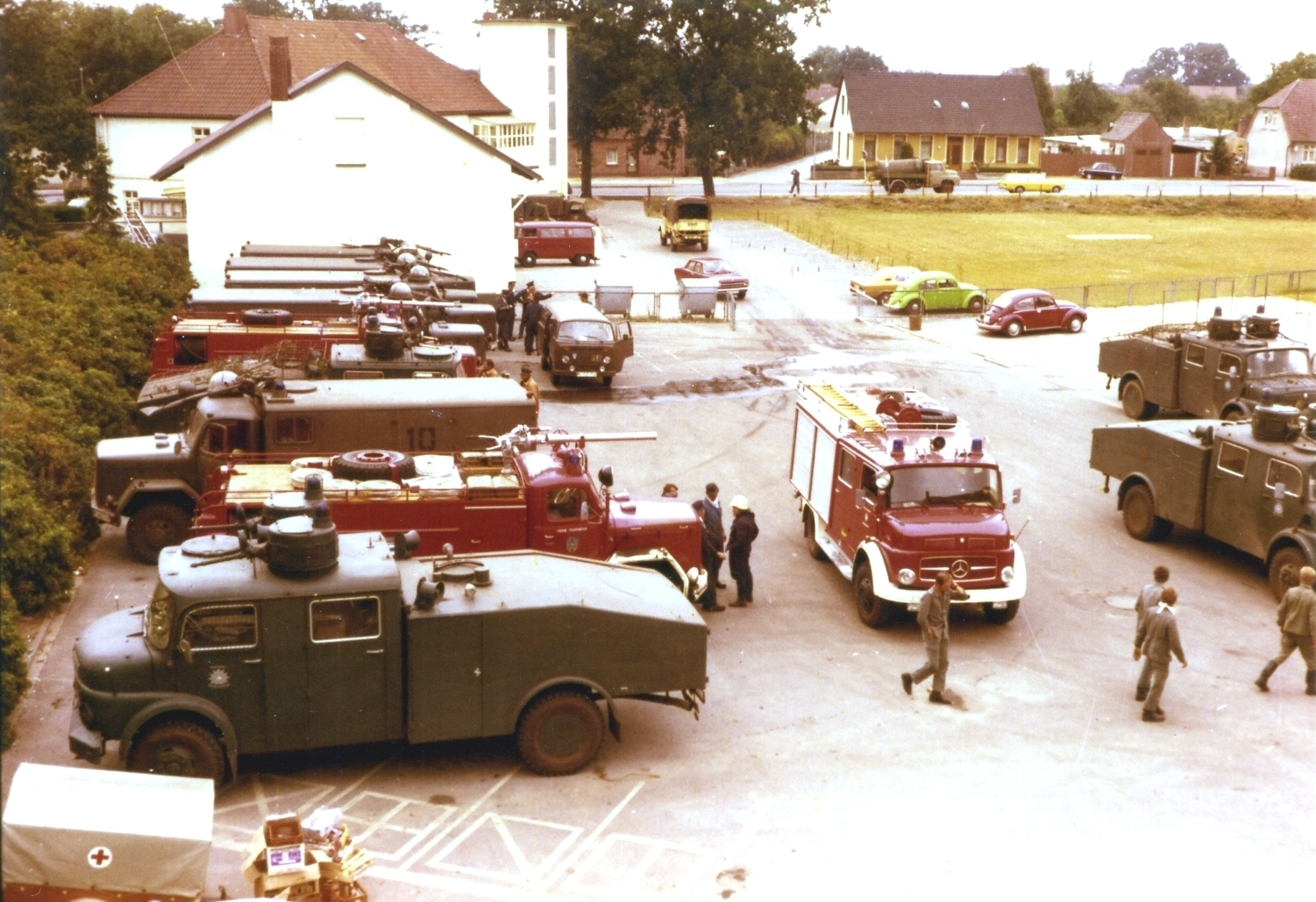
Fire engines of the Volunteer Fire Service and the Bundeswehr as well as Wawe4000 water cannons from the Hanover Riot Police gather in Eschede for operations

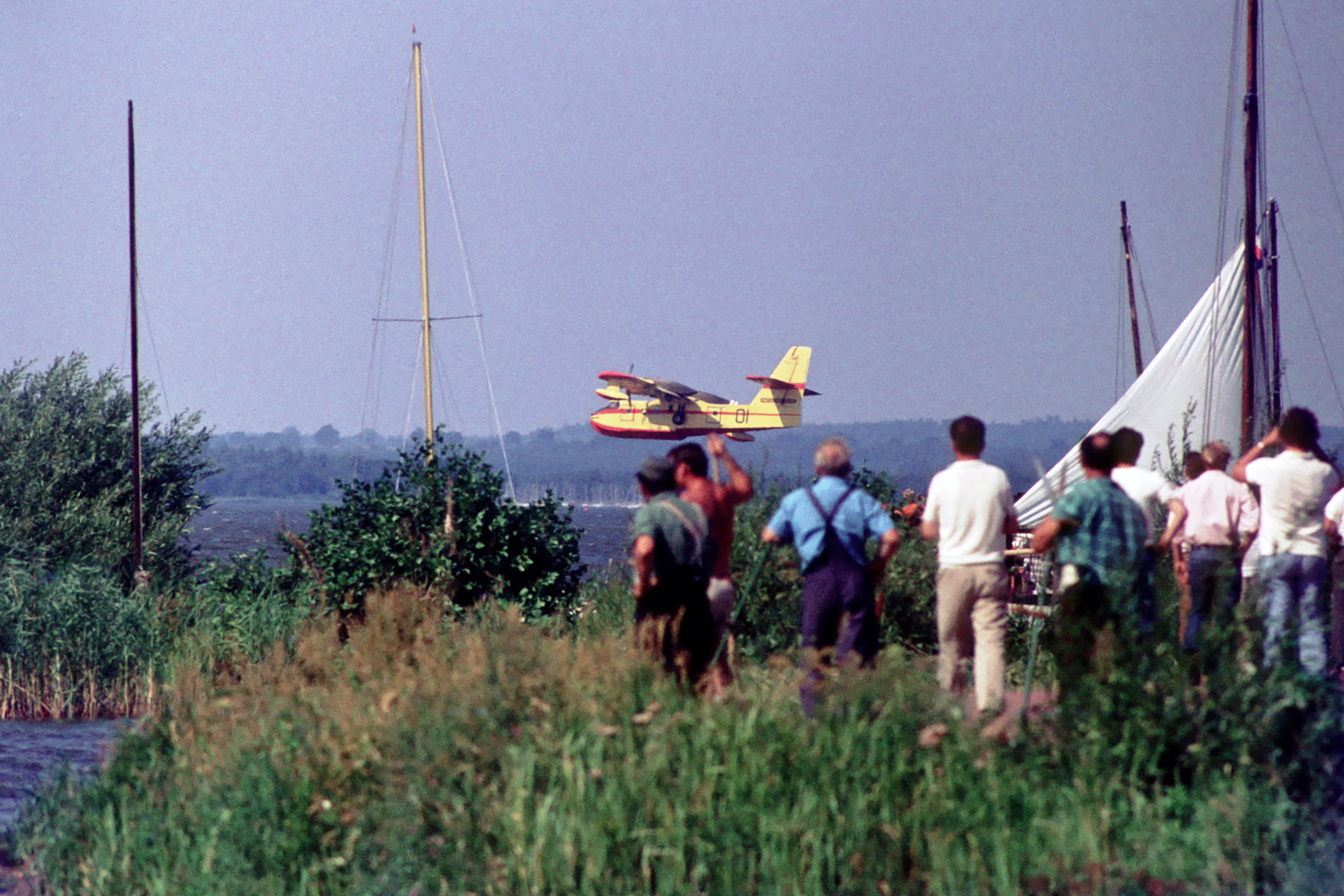
Canadair CL-215 taking water from the Steinhuder Meer 1

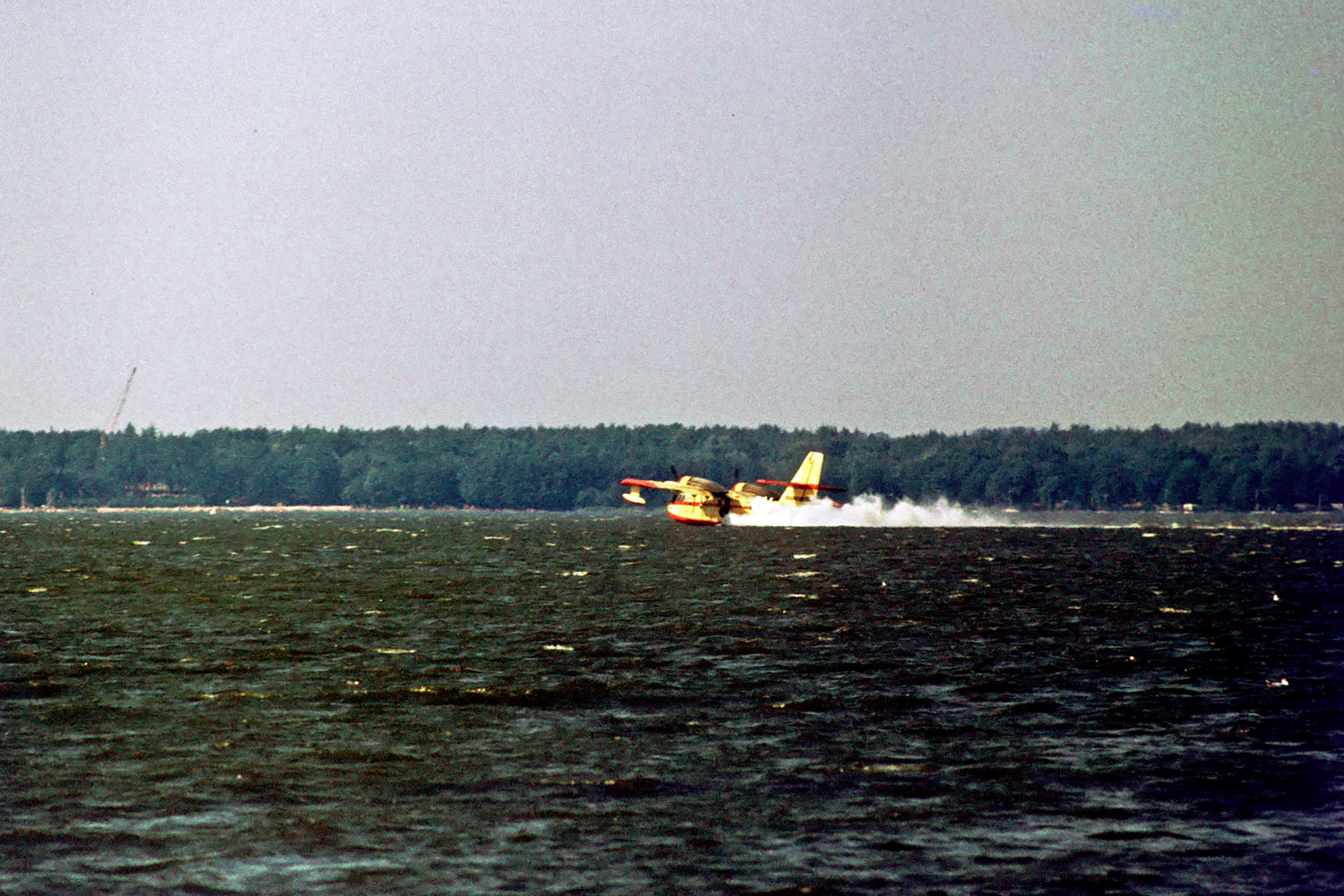
Canadair CL-215 taking water from the Steinhuder Meer 2

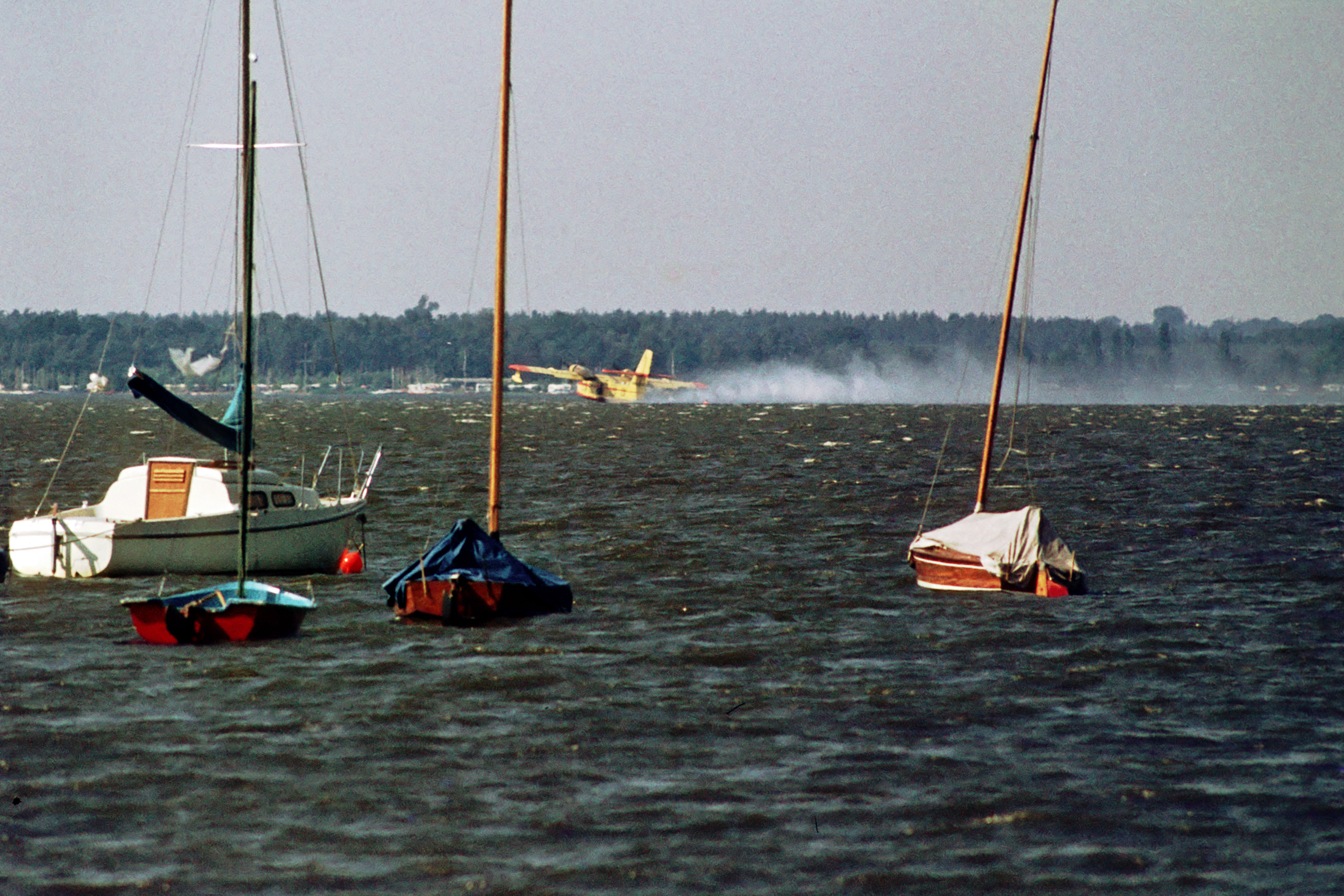
Canadair CL-215 taking water from the Steinhuder Meer 3

About 15,000 fire fighters from across Germany fought the fire. A total of 3,800 fire engines were deployed. Other authorities such as the police, Bundesgrenzschutz, customs, Technisches Hilfswerk and Forestry Commission as well as aid organisations like the German Red Cross, St. John's Ambulance, Malteser Hilfsdienst and Arbeiter-Samariter-Bund were engaged in fighting the forest fires in Lower Saxony.

But only when around 11,000 Bundeswehr soldiers with cross-country capable vehicles and heavy clearance equipment (including armoured recovery tanks with dozer blades) were deployed could the fire be contained by the creation of firebreaks. In addition there were many British troops deployed in particular AVRE's (Assault Vehicles Royal Engineers) from 26 Armoured Engineer Squadron from Hohne garrison.

For the first time, three aerial firefighter aircraft of the Canadair CL-215 type from France were used in support. These were exclusively used to protect small hamlets and farmsteads in the fire zone. They picked up water from the Steinhuder Meer. Airport fire appliances from the Rhineland were stationed at a Bundeswehr barracks in Wesendorf north of Gifhorn.

Firefighting was made more difficult by the weather conditions, the poor going on the tracks and constantly changing winds. The biggest problem however was an acute lack of water to fight the fire. Most of the natural water sources such as ponds, gravel pits or rivers were a long way from the sites of the fire. Water tenders had to travel long distances in order to refill their tanks.

== Firefighting from the railway ==
During the emergency a railway firefighting train was deployed. The Hanover Railway Fire Service had stood by on 12 August 1975 for deployment to the disaster area. Four tank wagons and a flat wagon were made available for the firefighting train. Each tanker held 45,000 litres of water. The Hanover Railway Fire Service put out fires by the railway track between Eschede and Garßen.

The flat wagon carried the Hanover Fire Service's TLF 16 fire appliance; two tank wagons provided it with water. So that water would be continuously available, the two other tank wagons were also filled with water. Once the diesel locomotive had delivered two full tank wagons, it would then return to Uelzen with the empty ones in order to refill them at the water crane there. The deployment of the fire train ended on 16 August 1975. For future incidents the Deutsche Bundesbahn has stationed four water wagons along the railway line from Hanover to Celle.

== Consequences ==
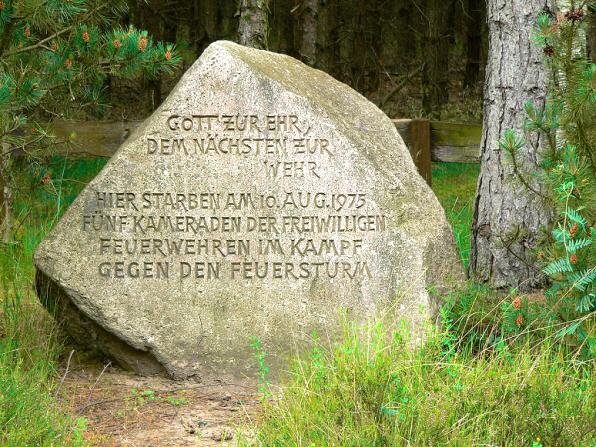
Memorial at the spot where five firemen were killed near Meinersen.

The fire destroyed 7,418 hectares (18,330 acres) of forest and caused damage assessed at more than 18 million euros. Immediately after the fire, the chief executive (Oberkreisdirektor) responsible for the district of Celle, who was not felt to have handled the problem well, was replaced. At the site where five firemen died a memorial was erected; it lies in a wooded are east of Meinersen by the B 188 federal road and is signed. It consists of a walled enclosure with a large memorial stone and five smaller ones, symbolising each of the victims.

A commemorative medal and certificate was awarded to all those deployed during the fire disaster in August 1975.

=== Fire service equipment ===
The fire services have been better equipped since the fire:

- They have been given forest firefighting maps to the same standard as those of the Bundeswehr and the forestry commission.
- Fire engines have been fitted with all-wheel drive.
- Before the disaster, the fire services only had radios with a few channels (SEM 37/47/57), which led to communication problems during the fire. The fire services that had deployed from outside the area only turned up with their own communication channels - and not that of the local area. As a result, several appliances burned because they could not call for assistance. Following this operation the use of multi-channel radios (FuG-7/8) was ordered.
- Amongst the improved equipment purchased were 8/18 water tenders with a larger tank (2,400 L), the so-called Niedersachsentanker or "Lower Saxony tanker".
- In addition, command and control vehicles (Einsatzleitfahrzeuge) were procured and specialized communication units (Fernmeldezüge) established.
- Furthermore, disaster management was improved, something which turned out to be of benefit at the 1998 Eschede train disaster.

=== Water for firefighting ===
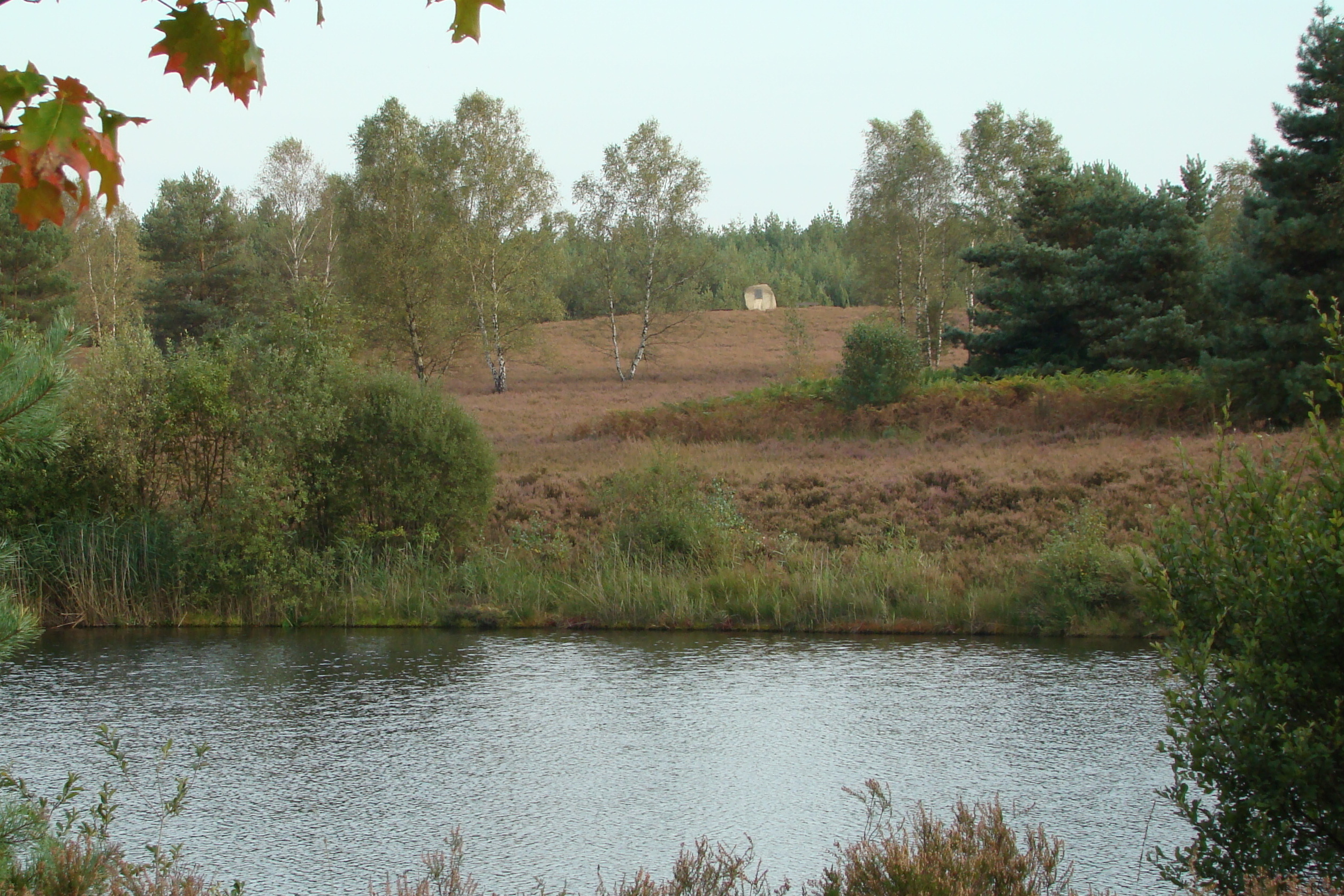
Pond between Oldendorf und Eschede used for water to fight the fire with a memorial stone in the background. It was near this spot that the forest fire in the district of Celle started on 10 August.

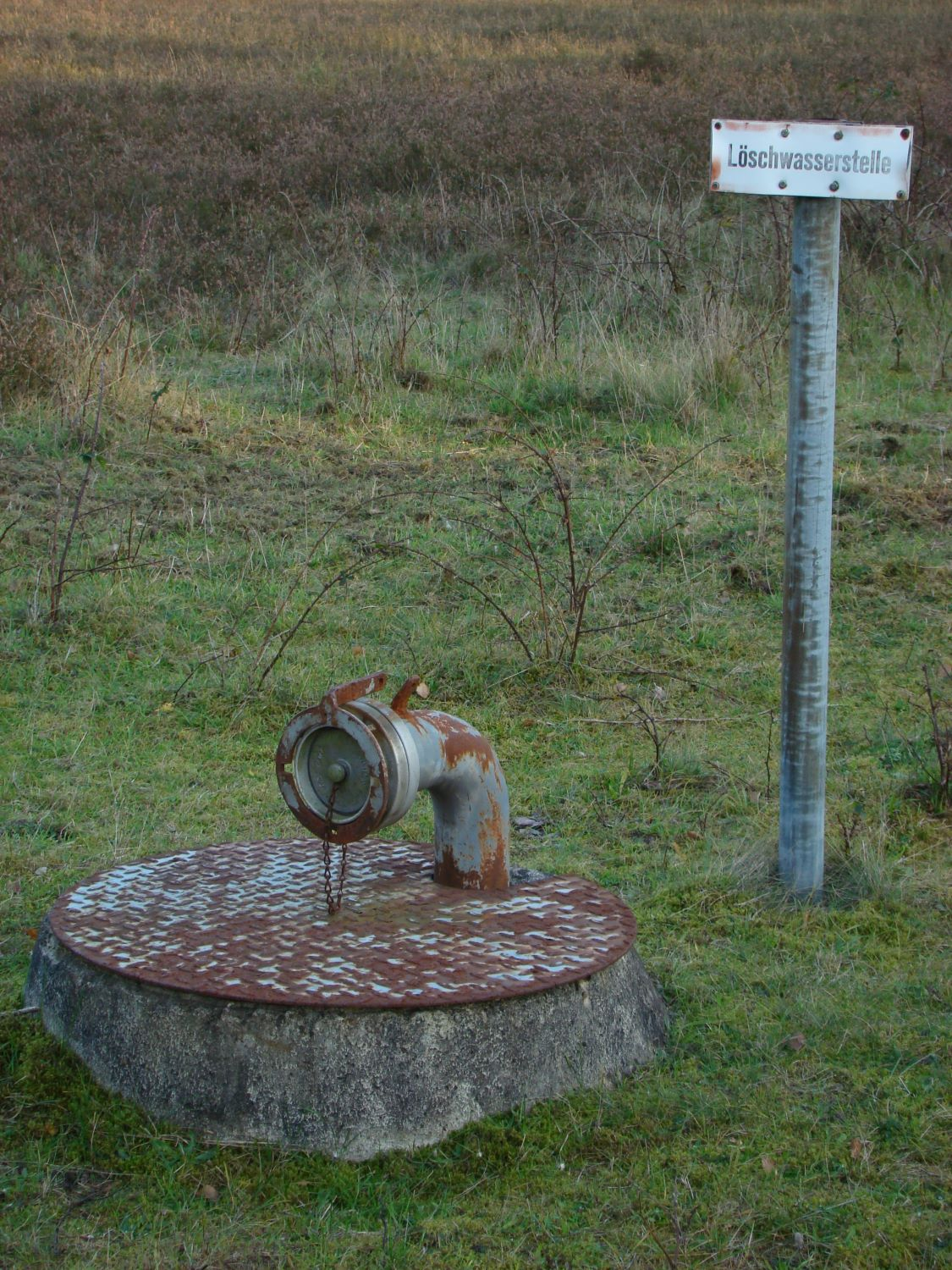
Pipe of a water tank for firefighting

A consequence of the fire disaster has been that fire protection on the Lüneburg Heide, as well as Germany-wide, has been considerably improved. For example, at particularly endangered places when the risk of forest fire is heightened an aerial firefighting service is deployed to provide aerial observation of the forests, which enables early warning. In order to be better equipped for future forest fires, metalled tracks were built for fire engines.

At lakes, fish ponds or gravel pits in the area, water take-off points were installed. In particularly endangered areas, special ponds were dug in order to provide rapid and efficient water collection by fire engines. Where there are no rivers for water collection, old heating oil tanks were used as water supply tanks each with between 20,000 and 100,000 litres of water in the ground.

=== Reforestation ===
In reforesting the areas destroyed by storm and forest fire, it was initially thought that pine monocultures should be abandoned and more deciduous trees (oaks and beech) should be planted. Soil investigations revealed, however, that deciduous trees would only be able to establish in a few places due to the poor sandy soil. The forest fire had also destroyed much of the available humus soil. On the edge of the forests, larch was planted in places in order to act as fire protection. Otherwise the scorched areas were again uniformly reforested with pines.

== Sources ==
- Rudolf Augstein (Hrsg.): Das große Feuer. Wer hat versagt? 1975
