= Sassenburg-Stüde =

Coordinates: 52°33′21″N 10°40′38″E

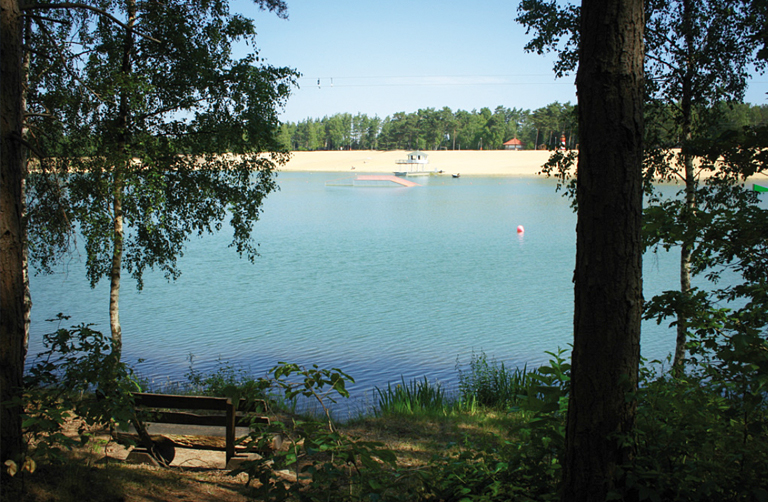
Bernsteinsee

Stüde is a village in the municipality of Sassenburg in Gifhorn district in the German state of Lower Saxony. In March 2005 it had 714 main residences and 339 secondary residences. It has an area of about 1,900 ha which consists mainly of woodland, including many clumps of pines on sandy soil. The Elbe Lateral Canal runs nearby. It is also home to the recreation area of the Bernsteinsee. Near the village is a glider airfield belonging to the Wolfsburg Aero-Club.

Village societies include the Sassenburg-Stüde Volunteer Firemen, the Stüde Marathon Club, the Wolfsburg Aero-Club, the shooting club and the Doppelzentner Brothers.

== Forest fire disaster ==
Stüde received national attention in 1975 when a forest and heath fire broke out there on 8 August and ran out of control, quickly leaping across the Elbe Side Canal and causing the most disastrous forest fire that summer.

== Canal marathon ==
Since 1991 Stüde has provided the start and finish for a marathon which follows the canal path almost entirely. From 1994 to 2003, in addition to a normal marathon, the unusual format of a double marathon was offered: two marathons inside 24 hours with a combined time. On the night of 31 December 1999/1 January 2000, under the name of the Millennium Run, the last marathon of 1999 in Europe and the first one of 2000 took place on the Stüde course. The run attracts participants from far afield. The course marathon record has been held since 1995 by Andrzej Nowak from Poland and the double marathon record by Paul Houston from Brisbane, Australia.
