= Neudorf-Platendorf =

- Ortsteil of Sassenburg
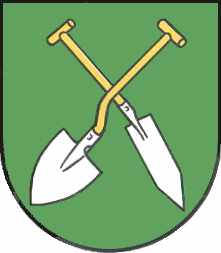
- Coat of arms
- Interactive map of Neudorf-Platendorf
- Location within Germany Location within Lower Saxony
- Coordinates: 52°32′11″N 10°36′12″E
- Country: Germany
- State: Lower Saxony
- District: Gifhorn
- Municipality: Sassenburg
- Elevation: 54 m (177 ft)

Population (2020)
  - Total: 2,800
- Time zone: UTC+01:00 (CET)
  - Summer (DST): UTC+02:00 (CEST)
- Postal codes: 38524
- Dialling codes: 05378

Neudorf-Platendorf is a village in the municipality of Sassenburg in Gifhorn district in the German state of Lower Saxony. As of 2020, its population is about 2,800.

== Geography ==
=== Location ===
The village lies east of the River Ise and the state forest of Dragen. The Aller flows by to the south. To the north and east lies the Großes Moor.

The six kilometre long village street is the longest straight village road in Lower Saxony. One feature of the village are the bridges that link each property to the village street.

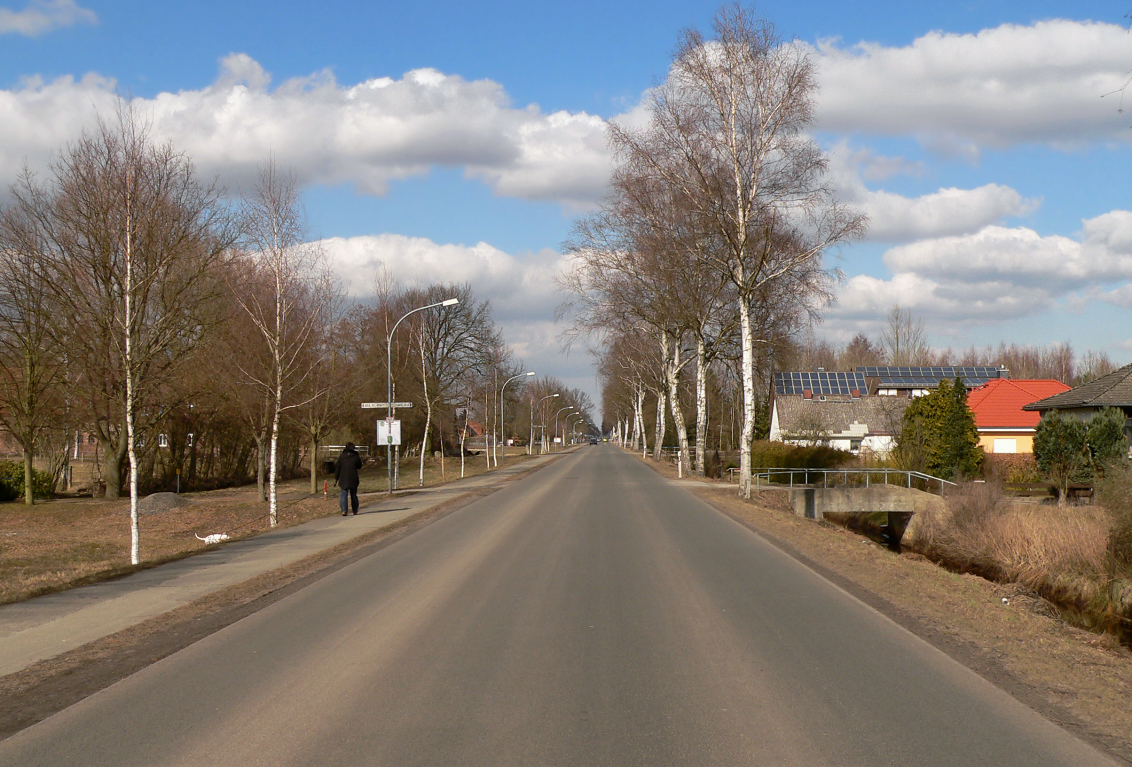
The main street

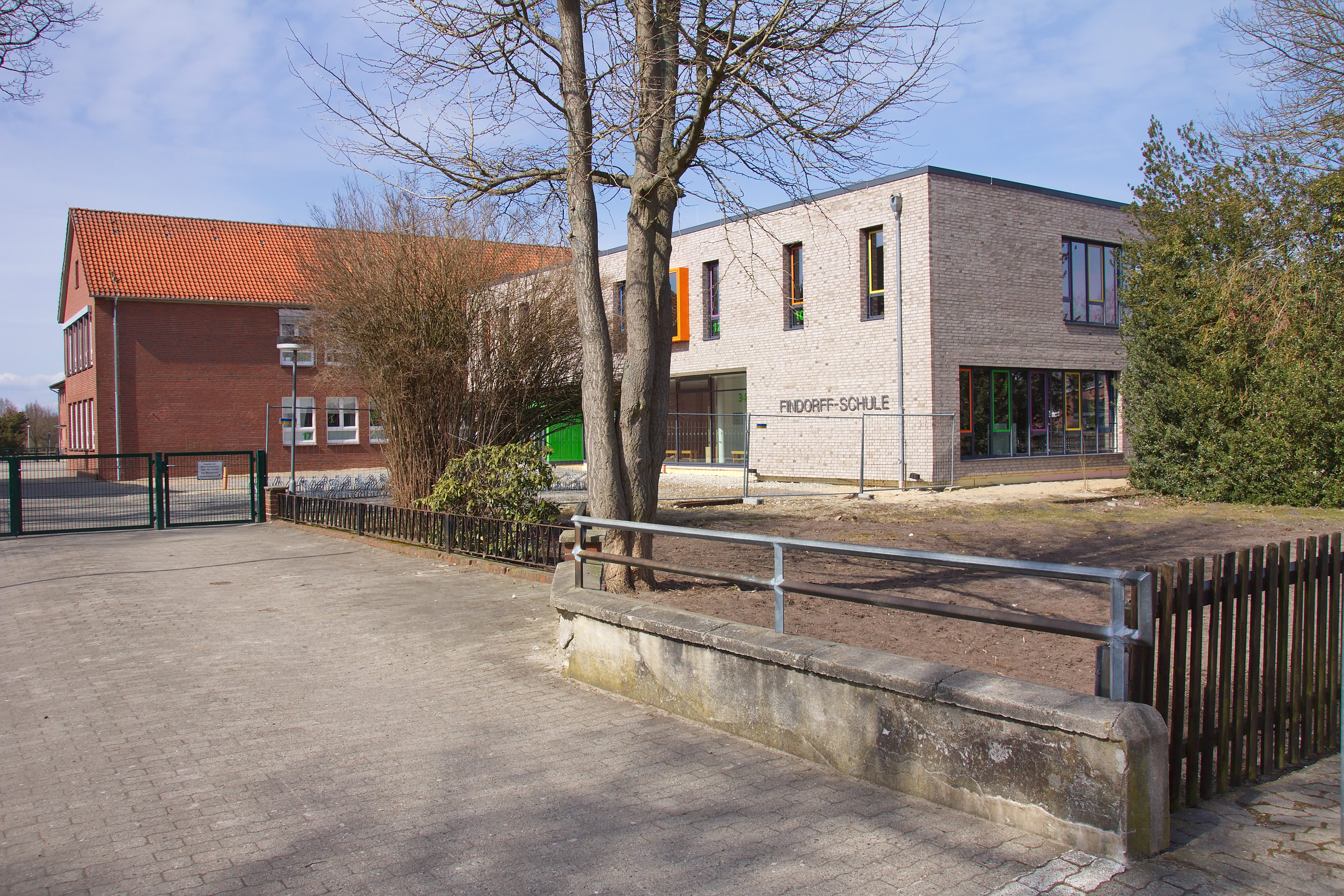
The school

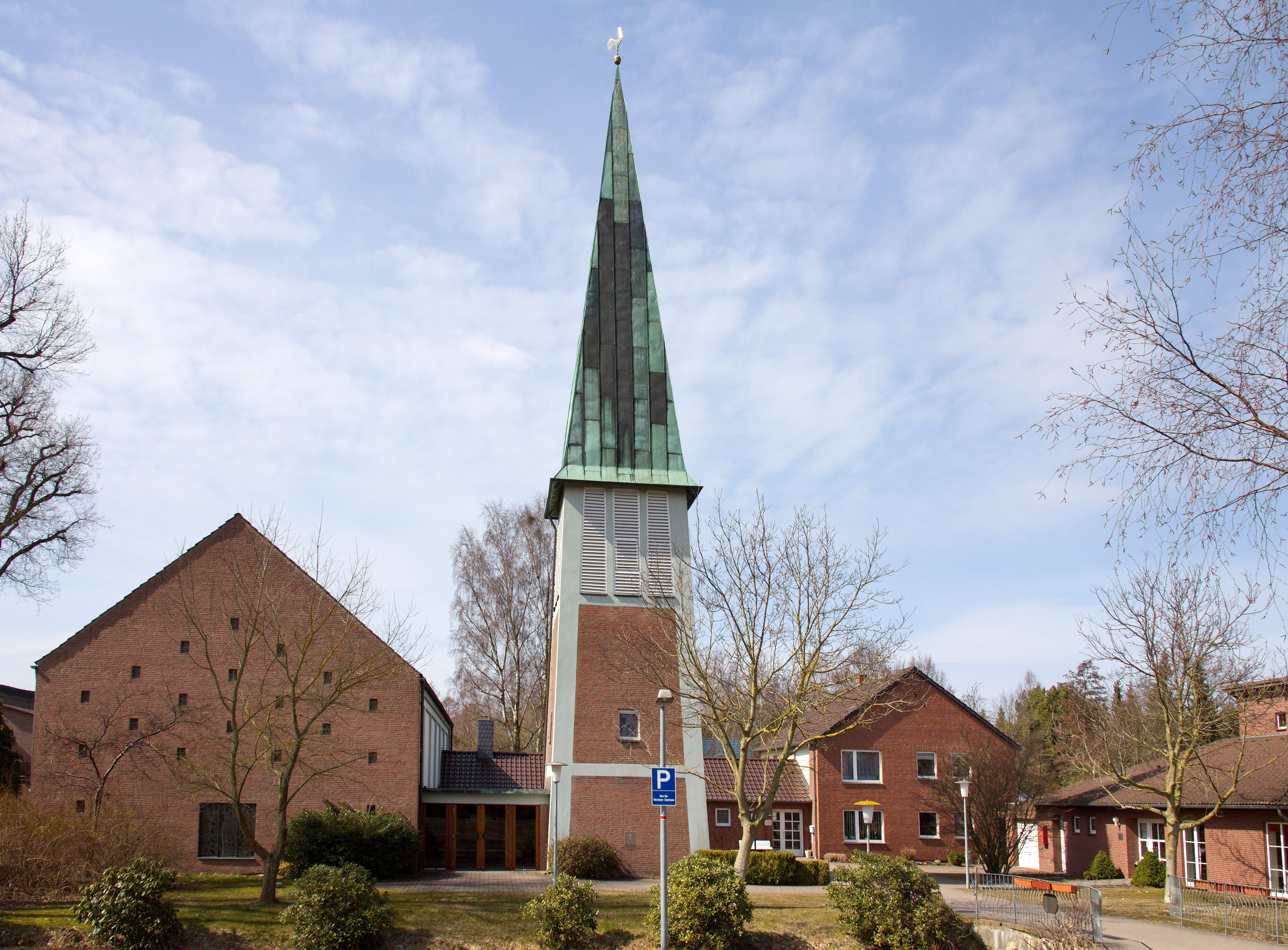
The Lutheran church

== Literature ==
- Der Landkreis Gifhorn. Die Landkreise in Gifhorn, Bd. 26. Hrsg. von Niedersächsischen Landesverwaltungsamt, Bremen 1972, ISBN 3-87172-327-4.
