= Will Vesper =

German author and literary critic (1882-1962)

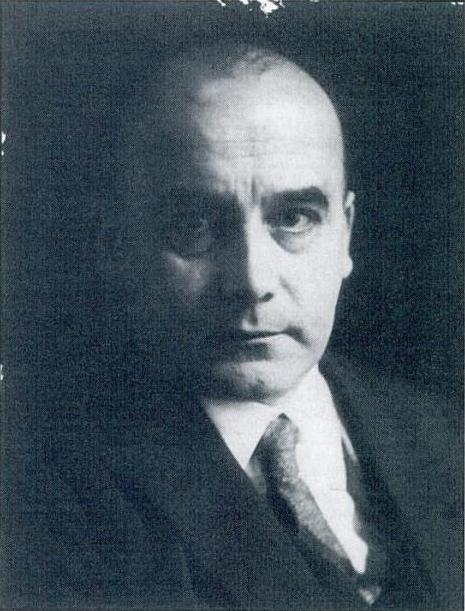
Vesper in 1932

Will Vesper (11 October 1882 – 14 March 1962) was a German author and literary critic who was involved in the Nazi book burnings.

== Life and work ==
Born into a Protestant farmer family in Barmen, he read History and Germanic philology (Germanistik) in Munich. From 1906, he was active as literary adviser and translator at the C. H. Beck publishing house. In 1913–1914, he was in Florence, Italy. He rose to early fame as the editor of several anthologies of German poetry of a spiritual kind, including Der deutsche Psalter and two volumes of Die Ernte aus acht Jahrhunderten deutscher Lyrik, and for his retelling of the Tristan and Isolde and Parzifal legends, all of which sold in tens of thousands before 1914. Vesper took part in World War I from 1915 to 1918, first as an infantryman, and towards the end of the war as scientific or intelligence assistant in the military staff.

After a two-year period as manager of the cultural section of the Deutsche Allgemeine Zeitung from 1918 to 1920, Vesper was employed from 1923 until 1943 as editor of the periodical Die schöne Literatur (Beautiful Literature), later under the title Die Neue Literatur (New Literature), which was to become the leading national socialist literature magazine. At the same time he published his own novels, stories and poems. His works mainly dealt with German history, and above all with proto-Germanic times. In these he displayed a decidedly nationalistic perception, which together with his glorification and exalting of the love of the native soil, of motherhood and war, made it inevitable that he would become a representative of Nazi ideology. His best-known work Das harte Geschlecht, about the Christian conversion of Iceland, appeared in 1931, and in May 1933 was praised in the Völkischer Beobachter as a "thoroughly bloodthirsty Northland novel".

In 1931, Vesper, whom Thomas Mann described as "already one of the worst of the nationalist buffoons", joined the NSDAP. After the exclusion of the disapproved authors from the Poetry department of the Academy of Prussian Arts like Thomas Mann, Leonhard Frank, Alfred Döblin, and others, Vesper installed among others Hans Friedrich Blunck, Hans Carossa, and Hans Grimm in the Poets Academy around 1933. In the May 1933 public book-burning in Dresden, Vesper gave the ceremonial speech. He was one of the 88 authors who in October 1933 signed the Vow of the Loyal Followers (Gelöbnis treuester Gefolgschaft) for Adolf Hitler published in the Vossische Zeitung and Frankfurter Zeitung.

Already, at the beginning of the thirties, Vesper was becoming known as an author of the Bertelsmann editions. In his literary Journal Die Neue Literatur Vesper carried out a kind of private censorship or revisionism, regularly embarking upon defamatory campaigns against authors and publishers who did not agree with his personal views. When he also did not hold back from attacking the State Directives in regard to writing, he lost the advantage of his position. By 1936, he withdrew from his duties to the estate of his wife Rose (Rimpau) Vesper at Triangel bei Gifhorn, where he occupied himself as a farmer but also continued to issue his literary newsletters until the year 1943.

After the war, Vesper was an editor in the Bertelsmann-Verlag and was active in right-wing circles through readings and Writers' Congresses for Hans Grimm in Lippoldsberg, also where he worked. He died in Gut Triangel, near Gifhorn, on 14 March 1962. Vesper's son, the author Bernward Vesper (1938–1971), also became well known when his autobiographic novel Die Reise (Journey, or, Trip) was posthumously published in 1977. As a student of German studies and sociology, he had been the partner of Gudrun Ensslin, who later became founder of the Red Army Faction. Die Reise is considered an important document of the spirit of the German student movement and German society of the 1960s.

== Writings ==
Novels, stories, and fables

- Der Segen, 1905
- Tristan und Isolde (Nacherzählung), 1911
- Parzifal (Nacherzählung), 1911
- Martin Luthers Jugendjahre, 1918
- Der Balte, 1919
- Annemarie, 1920
- Traumgewalten, 1920
- Gute Geister, 1921
- Die Nibelungensage (Nacherzählung), 1921
- Daniel Defoe. Leben und Abenteuer des Robinson Crusoe (Bearbeitung), 1922
- Die Gudrunsage (Nacherzählung), 1922
- Fröhliche Märchen (Neuerzählung), 1922
- Porzellan, 1922
- Die Wanderung des Herrn Ulrich von Hutten, 1922
- Die ewige Wiederkehr, 1922
- Der arme Konrad, 1924
- Der Pfeifer von Niclashausen, 1924 (Erzählung über den fränkischen Prediger Hans Böhm)
- Der Bundschuh zu Lehen, 1925
- Jonathan Swift: Lemuel Gullivers vier Reisen (Nacherzählung), 1927
- Der Heilige und der Papst, 1928
- Die Historie von Reinecke dem Fuchs (Nacherzählung), 1928
- Das Mutterbüchlein, 1928
- Tiermärchen aus aller Welt (Nacherzählung), 1928
- Das harte Geschlecht, 1931
- Sam in Schnabelweide, 1931
- Drei Erzählungen, 1933
- Ein Tag aus dem Leben Goethes, 1933
- Der entfesselte Säugling, 1935
- Geschichten von Liebe, Traum und Tod, 1937
- Kämpfer Gottes, 1938
- Im Flug nach Spanien, 1943
- Der unzufriedene Igel, 1943
- Seltsame Flöte, 1958
- Zauber der Heide, 1960
- Letzte Ernte, 1962

Dramas and farces

- Spiele der Liebe, 1913
- Die Liebesmesse, 1913
- Wer? Wen?, 1927
- Eine deutsche Feier, 1936

Poems

- Die Liebesmesse und andere Gedichte, 1913
- Vom großen Krieg 1914, 1915
- Der blühende Baum, 1916
- Briefe zweier Liebender, 1916
- Schön ist der Sommer, 1918
- Das Buch vom lieben Weihnachtsmann, 1920
- Mutter und Kind, 1920
- Des Wiesenmännchen Brautfahrt, 1920
- Inschriften und Gedichte, 1928
- Kranz des Lebens. Gesamtausgabe meiner Gedichte, 1934
- Rufe in die Zeit. Sprüche und Gedichte, 1937
- Das Neue Reich, 1939
- Bild des Führers, 1942
- Dennoch!, 1944
- Kleiner Kranz des Lebens. Auswahl, 1960

Essays and editions

- Friedrich Hölderlin: Hyperion (Nachwort), 1921
- Lob der Armut, 1921
- Die Jugendbibel (Bearbeitung), 1927
- Das Recht der Lebenden, 1927
- In den Bergen, auf dem Wasser (Einführung), 1928
- Die Weltenuhr, 1932
- (Ed.) Die Ernte aus acht Jahrhunderten deutsche Lyrik, 1906 (2 vols)
- (Ed.) Der deutsche Psalter – ein Jahrtausend geistlicher Dichtung, 1914
- (Ed.) Deutsche Lyrik von Heute: Ernte der Gegenwart und Ernte der Zeit, 1940

== Sources ==
- Gisela Berglund, Der Kampf um den Leser im Dritten Reich. Die Literaturpolitik der "Neuen Literatur" (Will Vesper) und der "Nationalsozialistischen Monatshefte" (The struggle surrounding the reader in the Third Reich) (Worms, Heintz 1980). (= Deutsches Exil 1933–45; 11) ISBN 3-921333-11-3
- Uwe Day, Hohepriester des Hitlerkults und literarischer Inquisitor. Über Will Vesper (High-Priests of the Hitler-cult and the literary Inquisitor - about Will Vesper). In: Griffel. Hannover. 9. (2000), p. 61-73.
- Frederick Alfred Lubich, Bernward Vespers "Die Reise". Von der Hitler-Jugend zur RAF. Identitätssuche unter dem Fluch des Faschismus (Bernward Vesper's The Journey. From the Hitler-youth to the RAF. The search for identity under the curse of Fascism.) In: German Studies Review. Tempe, Ariz. 10 (1987), p. 69-94.
- Wilhelm Pleyer, Hans Grimm, E. G. Kolbenheyer, Will Vesper. Gedenkrede (on 15 July 1962 on the occasion of the Lippoldsberg Poets'-days). (Munich and elsewhere, Bogen-Verlag 1962).
- Alexander Reck (Ed.), Briefwechsel Paul Ernst - Will Vesper 1919-1933 (Letters between). Einführung - Edition - Kommentar. (Würzburg: Königshausen und Neumann, 2003). ISBN 3-8260-2427-3
- Bernward Vesper, Die Reise (Trip). (Novel-essay). (Frankfurt am Main: März bei Zweitausendeins 1977).
- Böckelmann/Fischler, Bertelsmann. Hinter der Fassade des Medienimperiums (Betelsmann: Behind the facade of the Media empire). (Frankfurt am Main 2004, Eichborn) ISBN 3-8218-5551-7. (pp 66, 84f., 92, 110.)
- This article translated and abridged from German Wikipedia 2007
- Literature of and about Will Vesper in the Catalogue of the German National Library
