= Westerbeck (Sassenburg) =

- Ortsteil of Sassenburg
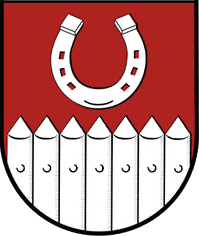
- Coat of arms
- Interactive map of Westerbeck
- Location within Germany Location within Lower Saxony
- Coordinates: 52°31′N 10°38′E
- Country: Germany
- State: Lower Saxony
- District: Gifhorn
- Municipality: Sassenburg

Government
  - Mayor: Annette Merz (CDU)

Area
  - Total: 88.4 km^{2} (34.1 sq mi)

Population (2021)
  - Total: 2,374
  - Density: 26.9/km^{2} (69.6/sq mi)
- Time zone: UTC+01:00 (CET)
  - Summer (DST): UTC+02:00 (CEST)
- Postal codes: 38524
- Dialling codes: 05371, 05378, 05379
- Vehicle registration: GF
- Website: www.sassenburg.de

Westerbeck is a district of the municipality of Sassenburg in the district of Gifhorn, Lower Saxony, Germany.

== Geography ==
Westerbeck is to the east of the Neudorf-Platendorf district and to the north of Dannenbüttel. The Neuhaus residential area belongs to Westerbeck.

== History ==
Westerbeck was first mentioned in a document in 1390 as Westerbeke. In 1838 an inn was set up in the Moorvogthaus at Schiffgraben, for which the building that still exists today was built in 1860, which is operated as Gasthof Neuhaus. In 1950, the Heinz Kunze peat factory was founded in the buildings of an abandoned prison camp in the forest near Westerbeck. On March 1, 1974, Westerbeck was incorporated into the new municipality of Sassenburg

=== Coat of arms ===
In red, a silver (white) horseshoe over a silver (white) picket fence.

== Politics ==
Westerbeck is represented by an eight-member local council. The local mayor is Annette Merz (CDU).
