= Sassenburg =

- Municipality
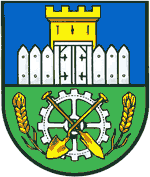
- Coat of arms

- Location of Sassenburg within Gifhorn district
- Interactive map of Sassenburg
- Location within Germany Location within Lower Saxony
- Coordinates: 52°31′N 10°38′E
- Country: Germany
- State: Lower Saxony
- District: Gifhorn
- Subdivisions: 6 districts

Government
  - Mayor (2021–26): Jochen Koslowski (Ind.)

Area
  - Total: 88.4 km^{2} (34.1 sq mi)
- Elevation: 55–69 m (180–226 ft)

Population (2025-12-31)
  - Total: 11,869
  - Density: 134/km^{2} (348/sq mi)
- Time zone: UTC+01:00 (CET)
  - Summer (DST): UTC+02:00 (CEST)
- Postal codes: 38524
- Dialling codes: 05371, 05378, 05379
- Vehicle registration: GF
- Website: www.sassenburg.de

Sassenburg is a municipality in the district of Gifhorn, Lower Saxony, Germany. It is situated approximately 7 km northeast of Gifhorn, and 15 km northwest of Wolfsburg. Sassenburg includes the villages of Dannenbüttel, Grußendorf, Neudorf-Platendorf, Stüde, Triangel and Westerbeck. The seat of the municipality is in the village Westerbeck.

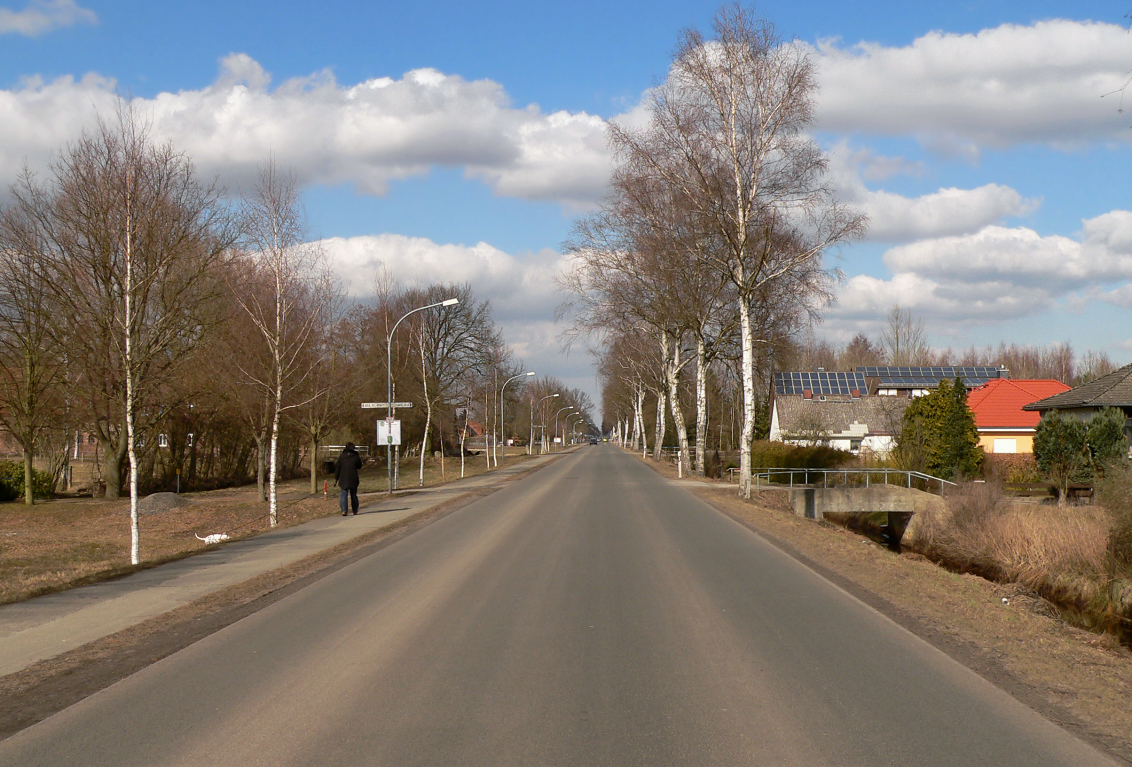
The main street in Neudorf-Platendorf

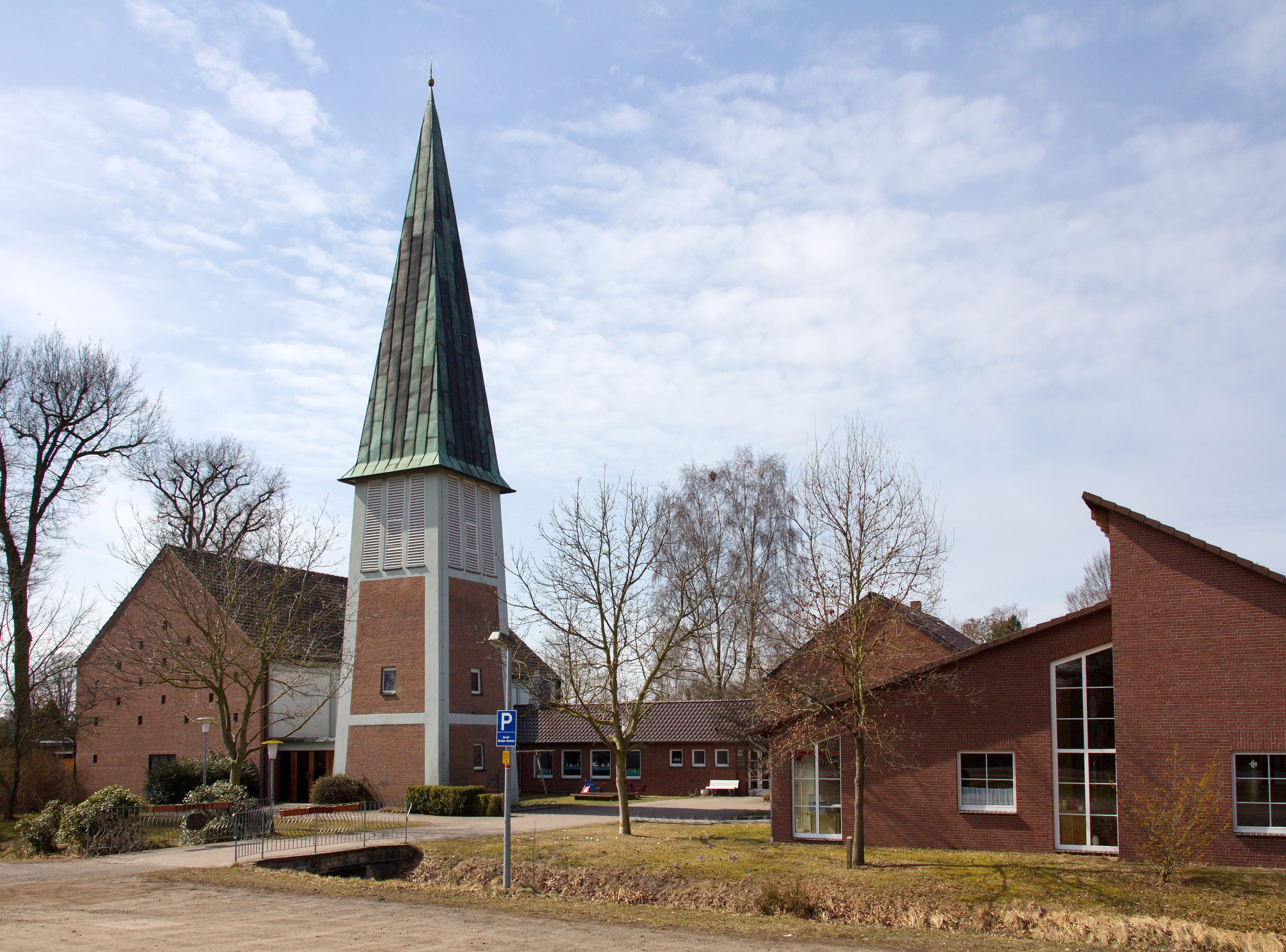
The Lutheran church in Neudorf-Platendorf

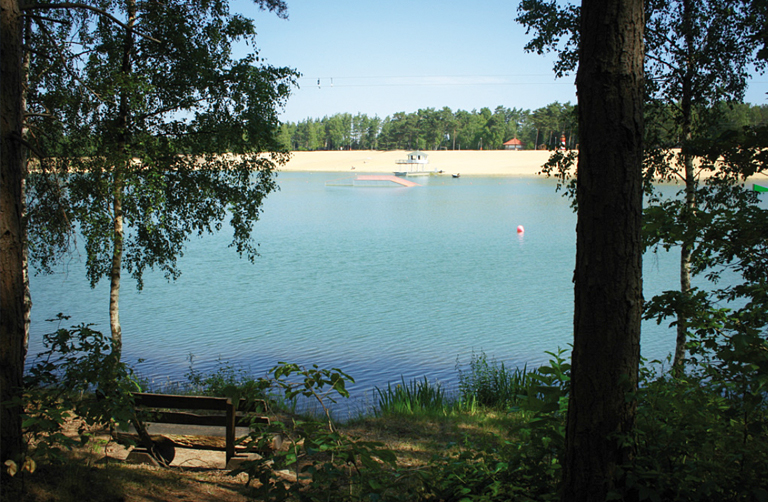
Lake Bernsteinsee near Stüde

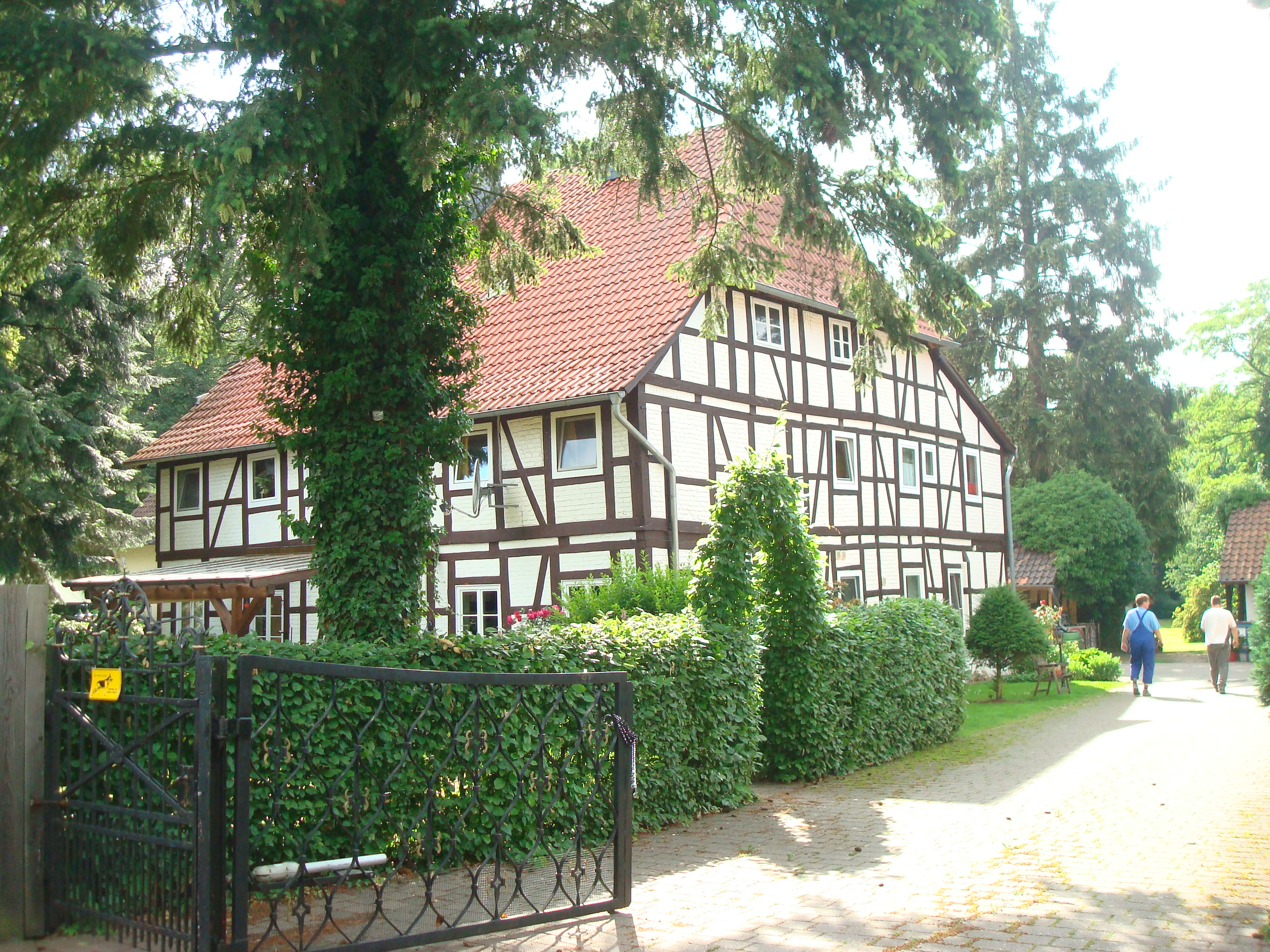
House in Triangel
