= Tostedt =

- Municipality
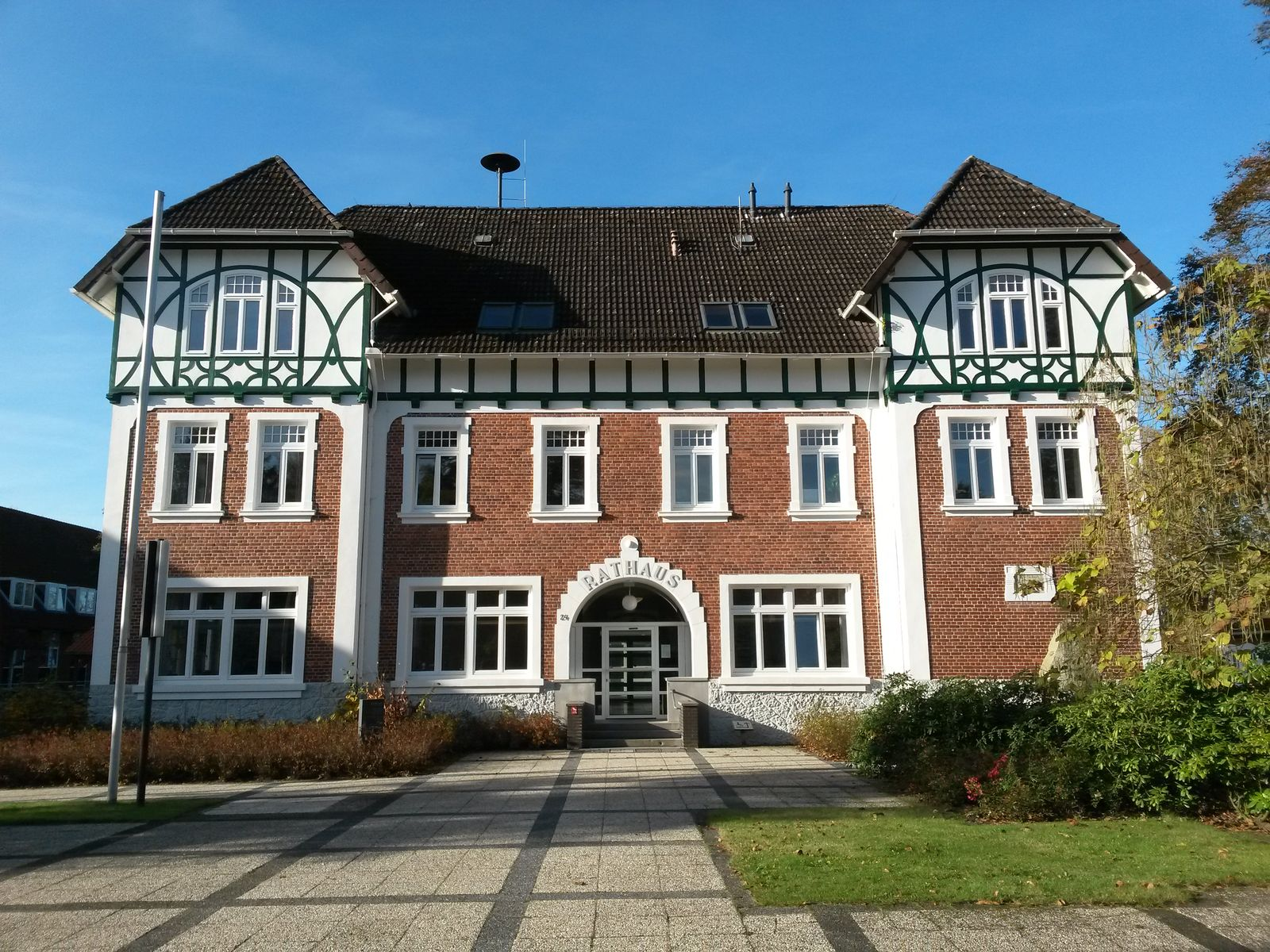
- Town hall

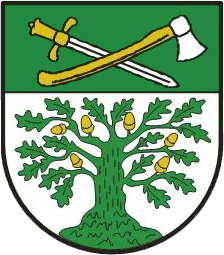
- Coat of arms

- Location of Tostedt within Harburg district
- Interactive map of Tostedt
- Location within Germany Location within Lower Saxony
- Coordinates: 53°17′N 9°43′E
- Country: Germany
- State: Lower Saxony
- District: Harburg
- Municipal assoc.: Tostedt

Government
  - Mayor: Nadja Weippert (Greens)

Area
  - Total: 48.24 km^{2} (18.63 sq mi)
- Elevation: 61 m (200 ft)

Population (2025-12-31)
  - Total: 14,411
  - Density: 298.7/km^{2} (773.7/sq mi)
- Time zone: UTC+01:00 (CET)
  - Summer (DST): UTC+02:00 (CEST)
- Postal codes: 21255
- Dialling codes: 04182
- Vehicle registration: WL
- Website: www.tostedt.de

Tostedt (Low German Töst) is a municipality in the district of Harburg, in Lower Saxony, Germany. It is the central administration of the collective municipality (Samtgemeinde Tostedt) which consists of 9 joint communities.

== Geography ==
=== Geography ===
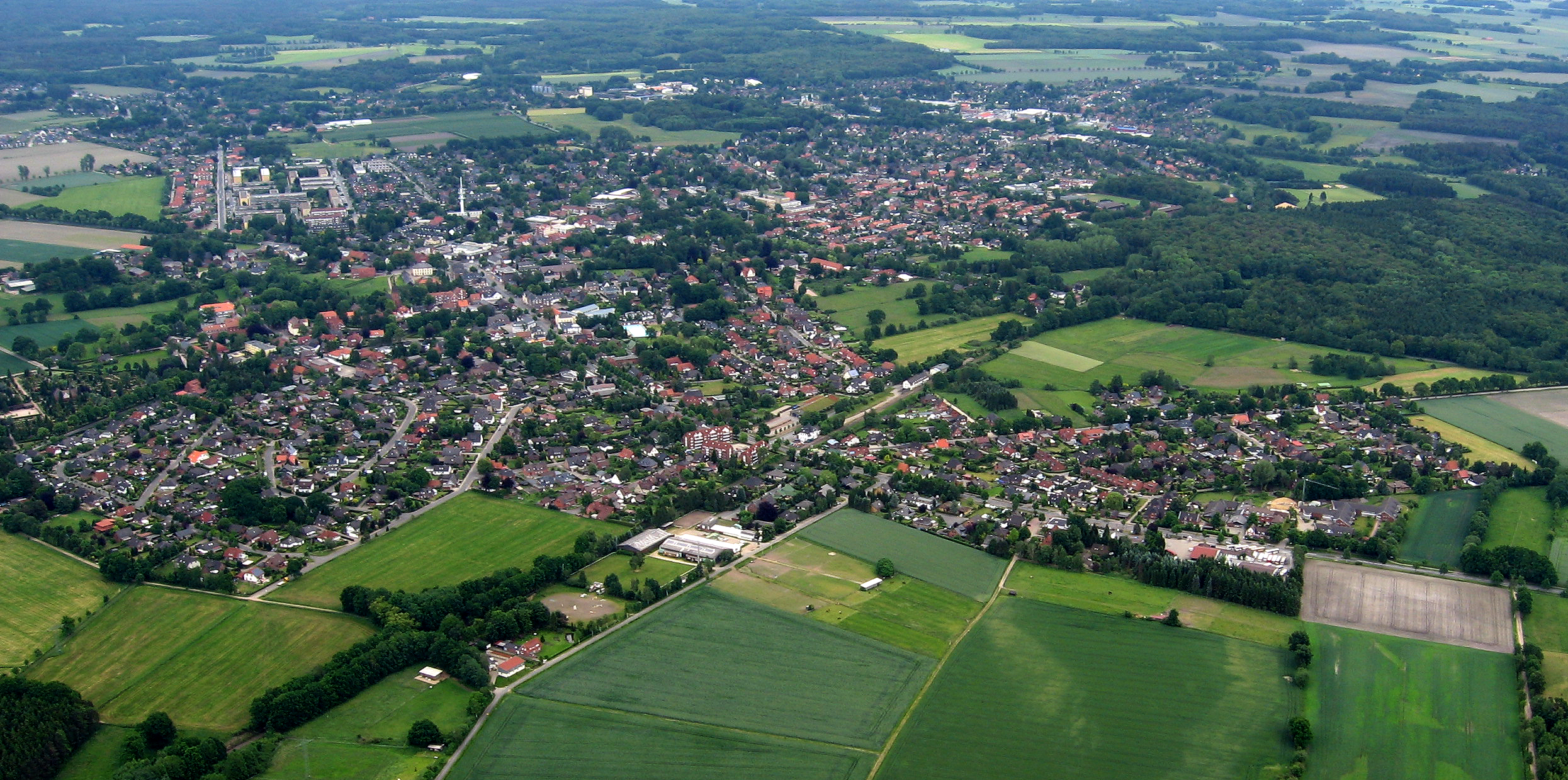
Tostedt 2012

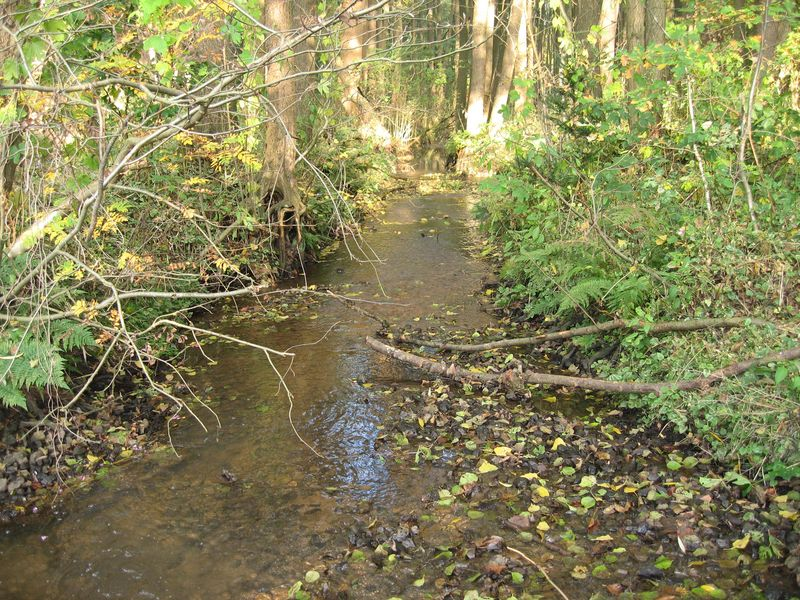
Stream Todtglüsinger Bach

Tostedt is located on the northwestern edge of Lüneburger Heide, 35 km southwest of Hamburg and 55 km east of Bremen. The areas highest point of 70 meters above sea level is to be found at the entrance facing Welle, its lowest point is 43 meters above sea level at the eastend of Todtglüsingen.

Near Tostedt the river Este flows towards Hollenstedt, and there are the spring of the river Oste towards Sittensen, as well as the streams Dohrener Mühlenbach, Langeloher Bach and Todtglüsinger Bach.

=== Neighboring cities and municipalities ===
- Buchholz in der Nordheide
- Dohren
- Handeloh
- Heidenau
- Kakenstorf
- Königsmoor
- Otter
- Welle
- Wistedt

=== Municipality ===
Approximately 10,500 residents live in Tostedt. In the district of Todtglüsingen there are another 3,200 residents. The municipality of Tostedt includes the villages Tostedt, Todtglüsingen, Langeloh, Neddernhof and Wüstenhöfen and the farmyards Dreihausen and Tiefenbruch. The place Tostedt-Land belongs partly to the municipality of Tostedt and partly to the municipality of Wistedt.

== History ==
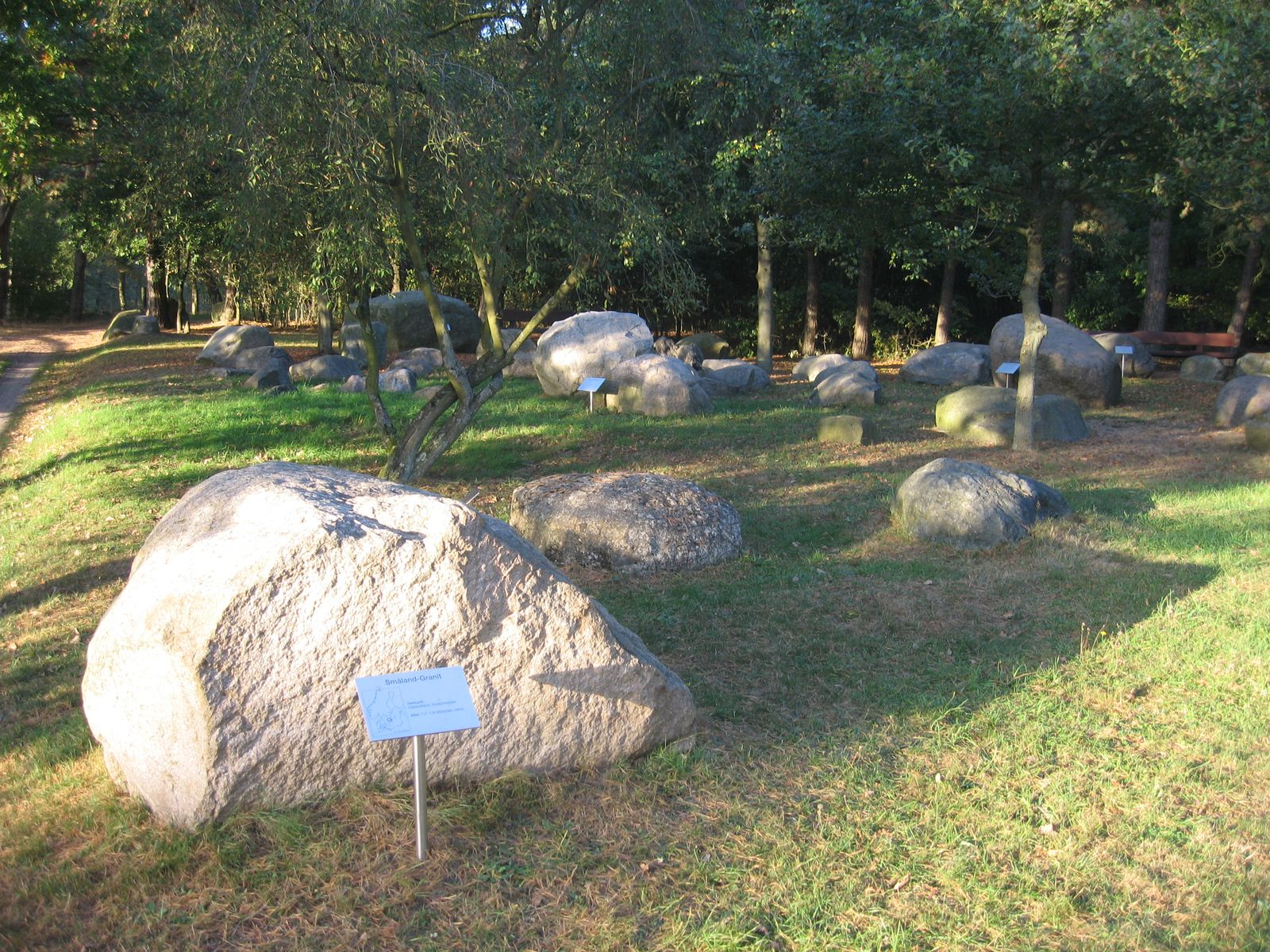
Ice-age-boulder-park Todtglüsingen

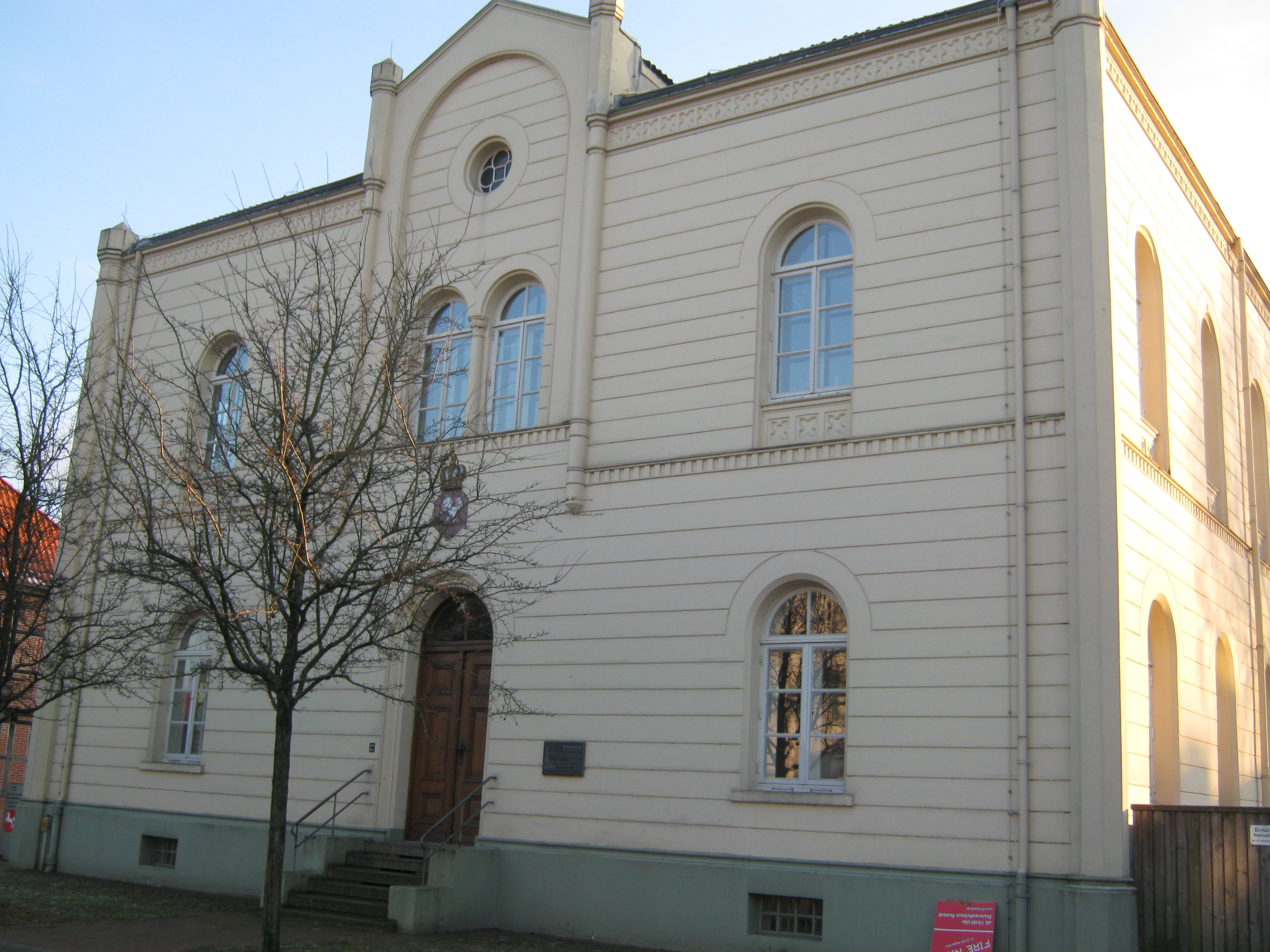
Court

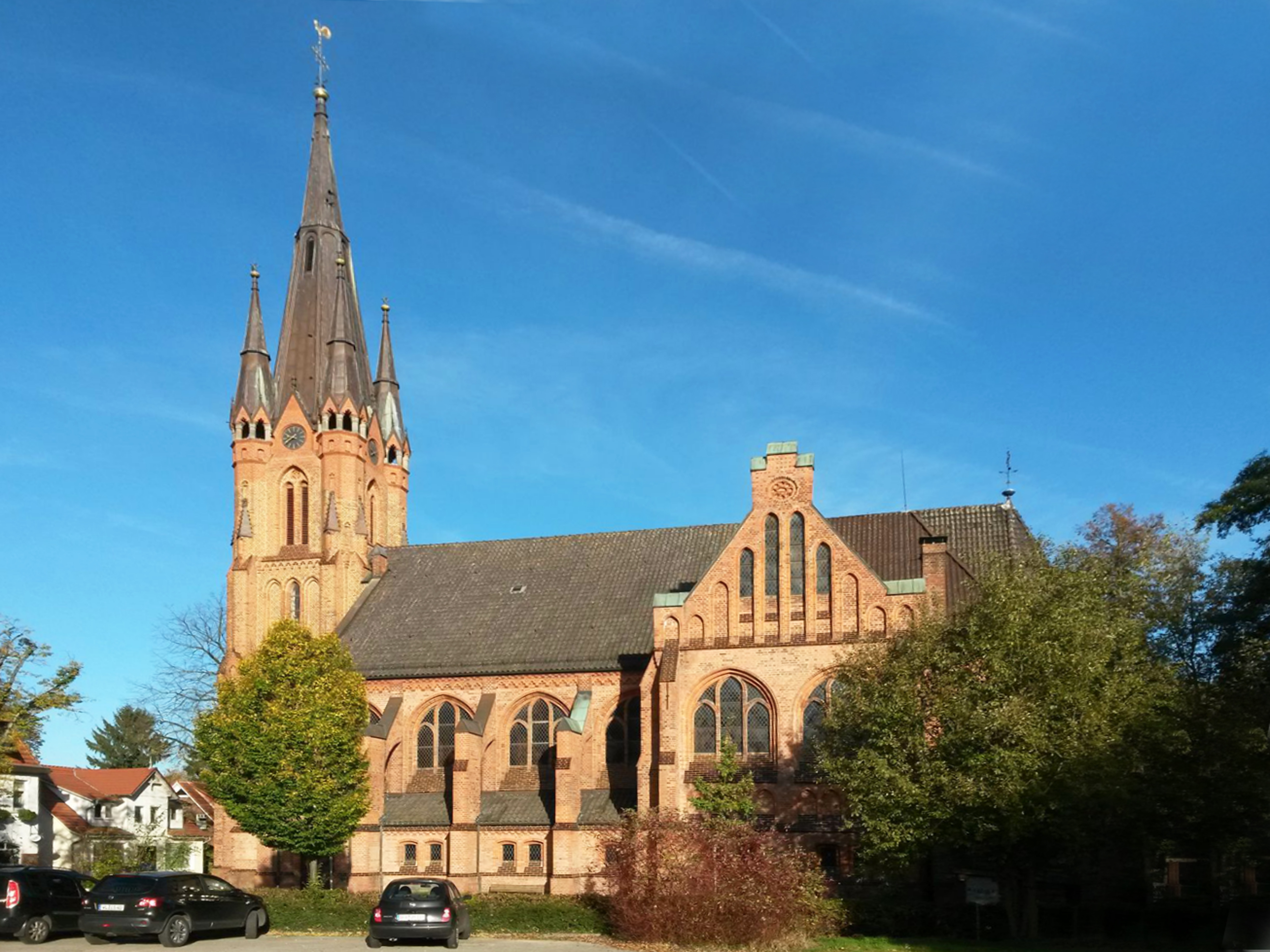
Church Johanneskirche

The first recording of Tostedt go back to 1105. In 1625 the jurisdiction was established in Tostedt, and Tostedt still has a local court with jurisdiction of the trade register in the Elbe-Weser triangle region. The house of the old post office Am Sande was once a coaching inn, where the Emperor Napoleon once stayed overnight.

Todtglüsingen and Tostedt were united on July 1, 1972.

== Politics ==
=== Council ===
The members of the council, which was elected in 2026, are:

- Greens - 8 seats
- CDU - 7 seats
- AfD - 5 seats
- SPD - 4 seats
- Zusammen - 3 seats
- WiT - 2 seat
- FDP - 1 seat
- Die Linke - 1 seat

=== Mayors ===
The title "mayor" was introduced in 1935.

- Christoph Wicke (1853–1872)
- Joachim Kröger (1872–1898)
- Friedrich Sommerfeld (1899–1904)
- Karl Möller (13 March 1904 – 27 October 1919)
- Adolf Gerlach (27 October 1919 – 23 January 1931)
- Claus Hamann (1 February 1931 – 30 September 1933)
- Otto Mohrmann (1 October 1933 – 30 September 1934)
- Claus Hamann (1 October 1934 – 31 May 1945)
- Alexander Daum (11 June 1945 – 31 August 1945)
- Friedrich Rossmann (1 September 1945 – 28 September 1946)
- Heinrich Fricke (29 September 1946 – 7 December 1950)
- Willy Aldag (8 December 1950 – 15 March 1971)
- Paul Elbers (13 April 1971 – 18 November 1976)
- Eckart Weithoener (19 November 1976 – 14 January 1979)
- Ruth Zuther (18 January 1979 – 5 November 1981)
- Günter Weiß (5 November 1981 – 27 November 1991)
- Klaus-Dieter Feindt (27 November 1991 – 31 October 1996)
- Günter Weiß (1 November 1996 – 21 March 2008)
- Erwin Becker (25 August 2008 – 1 November 2011)
- Gerhard Netzel (2 November 2011 – 12 September 2021)
- Nadja Weippert (since 13 September 2021)

=== Community Partnerships ===
- since 1989 with Morlaàs in France
- since 1992 with Lubaczów in Poland

== Musical life ==
For over 150 years, there have been the marching band of the shooting club Todtglüsingen, and the one of Tostedt and the Men's Glee Club Tostedt.

== Sport ==
The most successful sports clubs are the Todtglüsinger sports club, sports club MTV Tostedt with a membership in the second National Table Tennis League and the Women's Baseball League team of Dohren Wild Farmers. The juniors of Wild Farmers won the German championship in 2010. There is a Tostedt shooting club, a Todtglüsingen shooting club, a tennis club and a riding club.

== Security ==
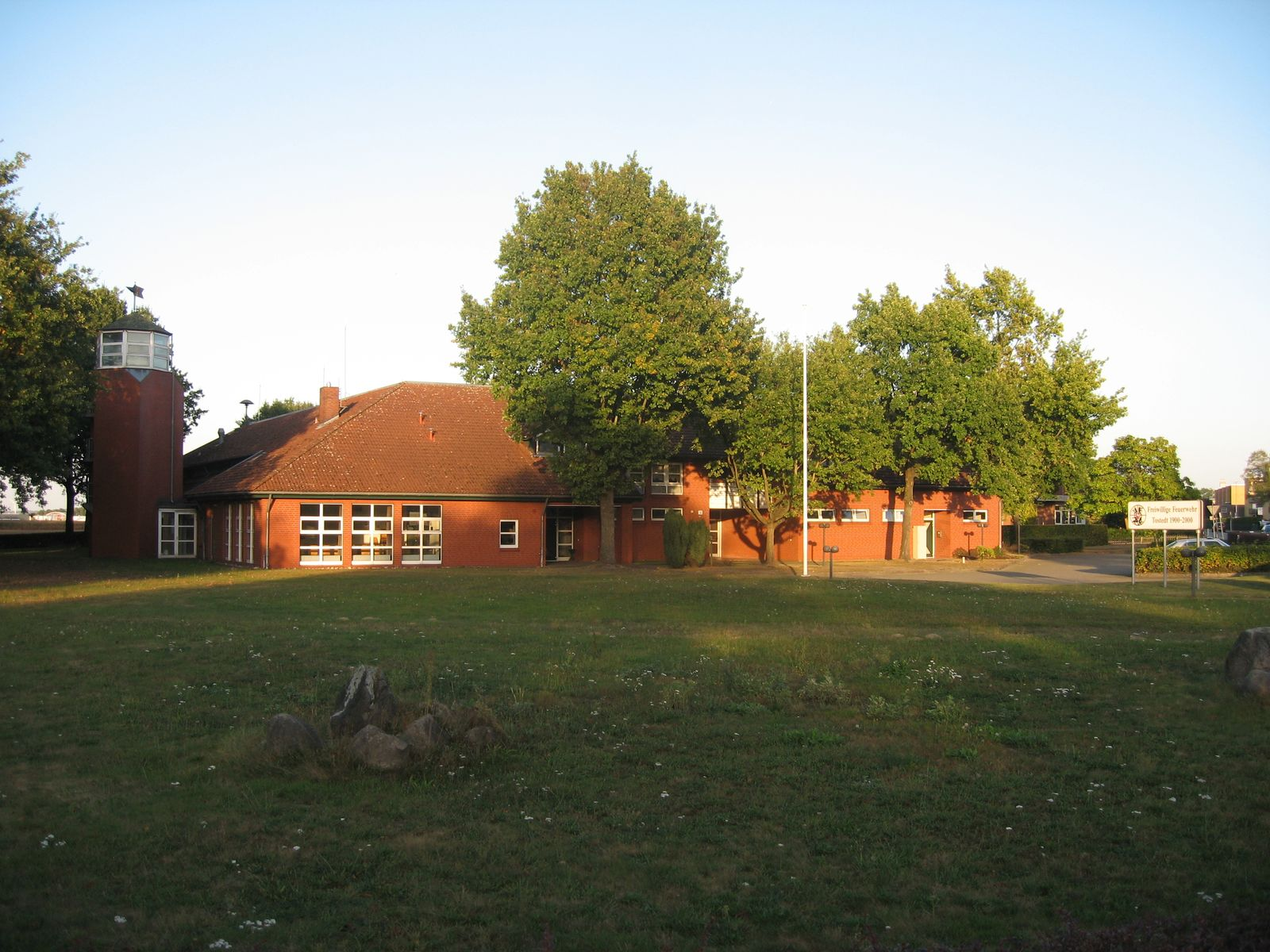
Tostedt fire department

There are two volunteer fire departments in Tostedt, the Tostedt firefighters and the firefighters Todtglüsingen. There is a police station.

== Events ==
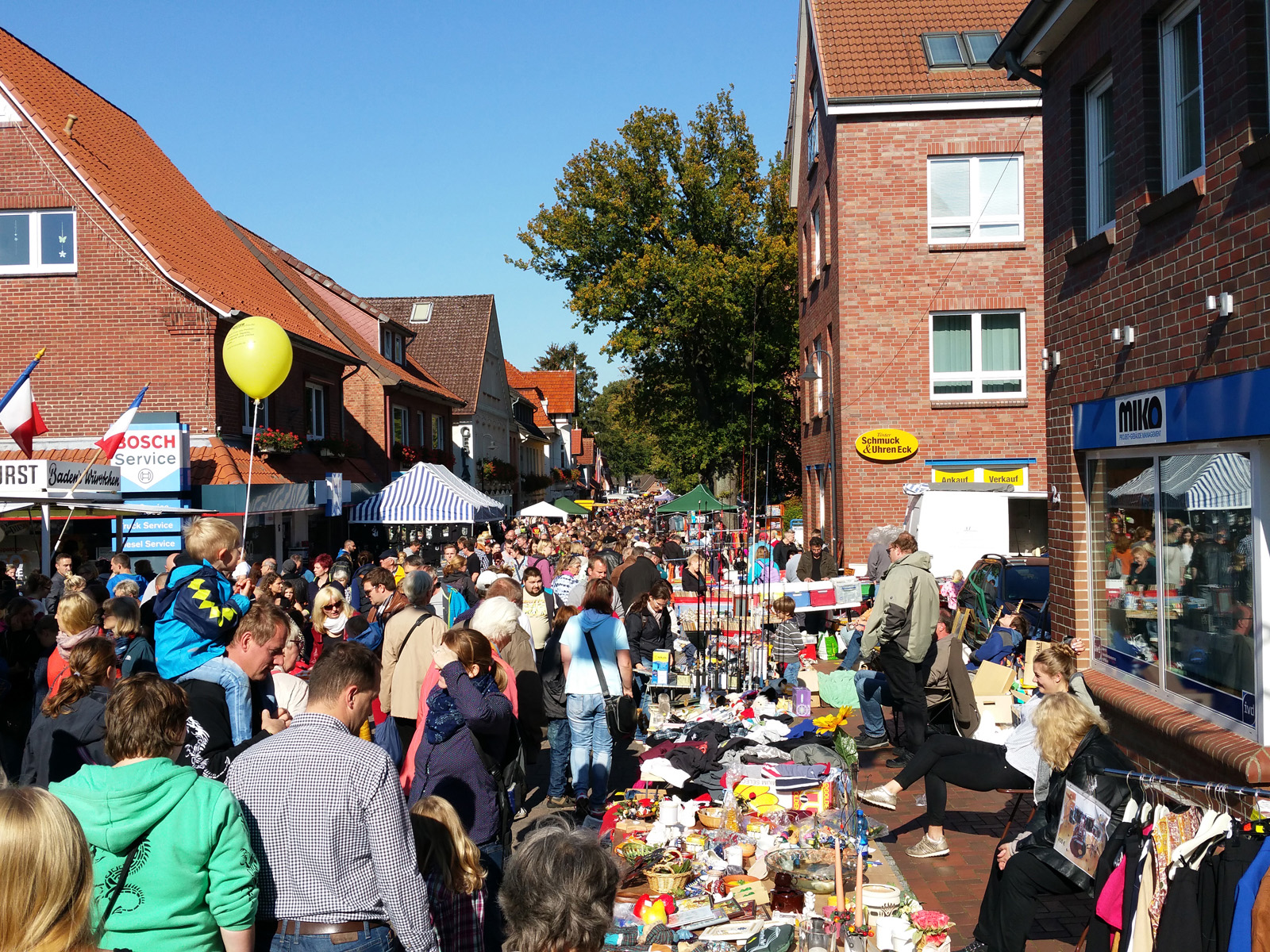
Tostedt flea market in Himmelsweg

- Since 1973 the Töster flea market place has taken on the first weekend of October. It is the largest flea market in northern Germany. About 700 exhibitors come from across Germany, the Netherlands and Denmark.
- The Advertising circle Tostedt, presents the Christmas Market.
- The maypole as a common festival takes place in Todtglüsingen on 1 May of the Todtglüsingen shooting club, the fire department and the sports club Todtglüsingen.
- There are Schützenfests in Tostedt and Todtglüsingen.

== Tourism ==
The Este bike path and the Oste bike path towards Bremervörde reach the station in Tostedt. The trails E1 European long distance path, Heidschnuckenweg, Freudenthalweg and Heidepuzzle-trail pass by in the eastern forest area Lohbergen.

== Economy and Infrastructure ==
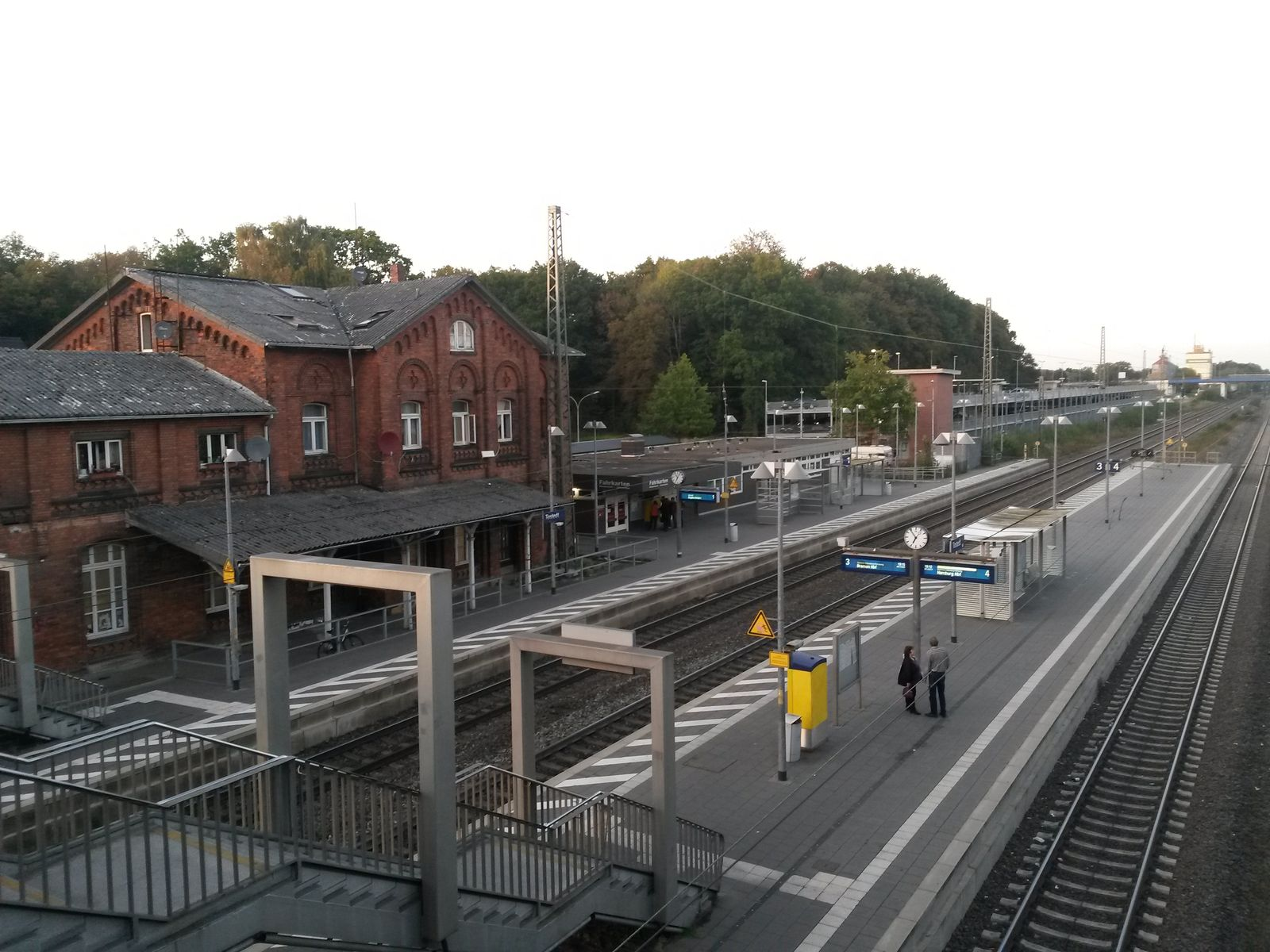
Station Tostedt

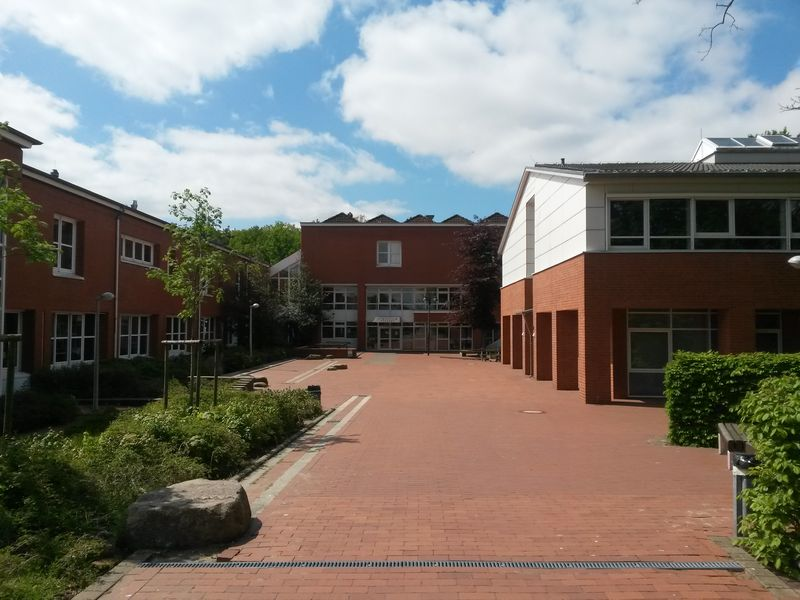
Gymnasium Tostedt

=== Traffic ===
Tostedt on the Bundesstraße 75 near the Highway A1 was once a stopover for stagecoaches between Hamburg and Bremen. Tostedt is part of the metropolitan region of Hamburg and a member of the Hamburg Transport Association HVV. The Tostedt station is a stopover of metronome railway company from Hamburg to Bremen. The station Tostedt is equipped for disabled people. From the station it is 32 minutes to the Hamburg main station and 36 minutes to the Bremen central station.

=== Courts and authorities ===
Tostedt is the place of District Courts Tostedt and the seat of the collective municipality Tostedt.

=== Public Institutions ===
- The Tostedt public swimming pool is one of the few in Germany that is free of charge.
- In Tostedt there is a workshop for handicapped and for mentally disabled people established in 1982.

=== Education ===
Tostedt schools are a Gymnasium, a Realschule, a Hauptschule and several elementary schools. Several kindergarten and a nature kindergarten.
