= History of the Irish Guards =

Infantry regiment of the British Army

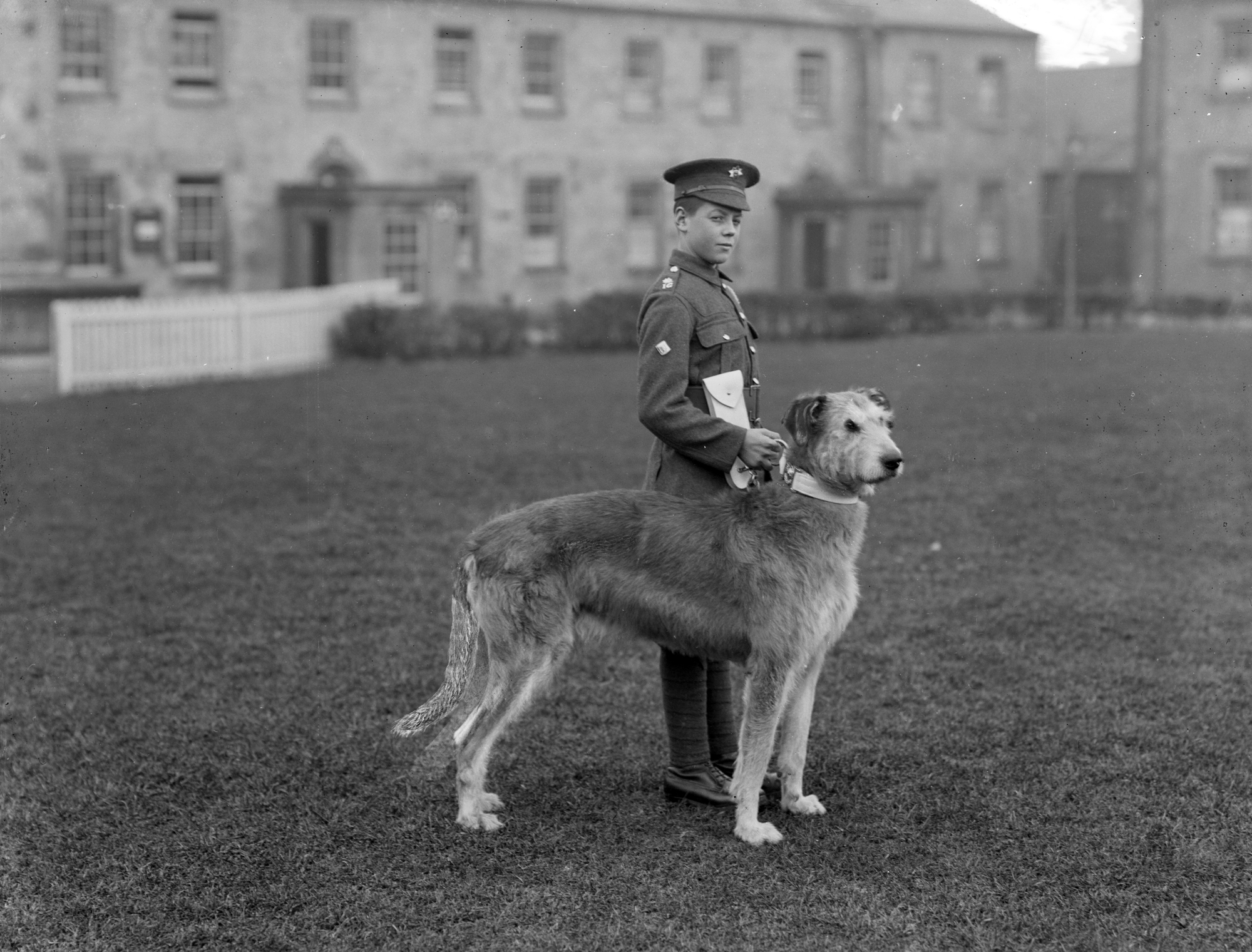
The Irish Guards mascot Leitrim Boy on recruiting duties in Waterford during the First World War, 21 February 1917.

The history of the Irish Guards as an infantry regiment of the British Army dates from the Regiment's formation in 1900. The Irish Guards have an over one hundred year-long history during which the regiment have served with distinction in almost all of the United Kingdom's conflicts throughout the 20th and early 21st centuries ranging from the First World War to the War in Afghanistan.

The Irish Guards were formed by Queen Victoria in 1900 to honour the Irishmen who had fought in the Second Boer War. The Irish Guards first saw combat as a regiment in the First World War during which they fought on the Western Front from the beginning to the end of the war. The regiment played a significant role in many of the First World War's pivotal battles such as the First Battle of Ypres, the Battle of Loos and the Battle of the Somme. By the end of the war, the regiment had experienced significant losses and won four Victoria Crosses, two of them posthumous. The Irish Guards were to experience similar fighting just twenty one years later with the commencement of the Second World War. The regiment won two further Victoria Crosses and saw action during the Norwegian Campaign, the Battle of France, the Tunisian Campaign, the Italian Campaign, Operation Overlord and Operation Market Garden. Following the conclusion of the Second World War, the Irish Guards were involved in several conflicts arising from the decline of the British Empire, including the Jewish insurgency in Mandatory Palestine, against the EOKA group in Cyprus and in the Aden Emergency. Moving into the 21st Century, the Irish Guards served in the Balkans Conflicts, the Iraq War and the War in Afghanistan.

== Creation ==
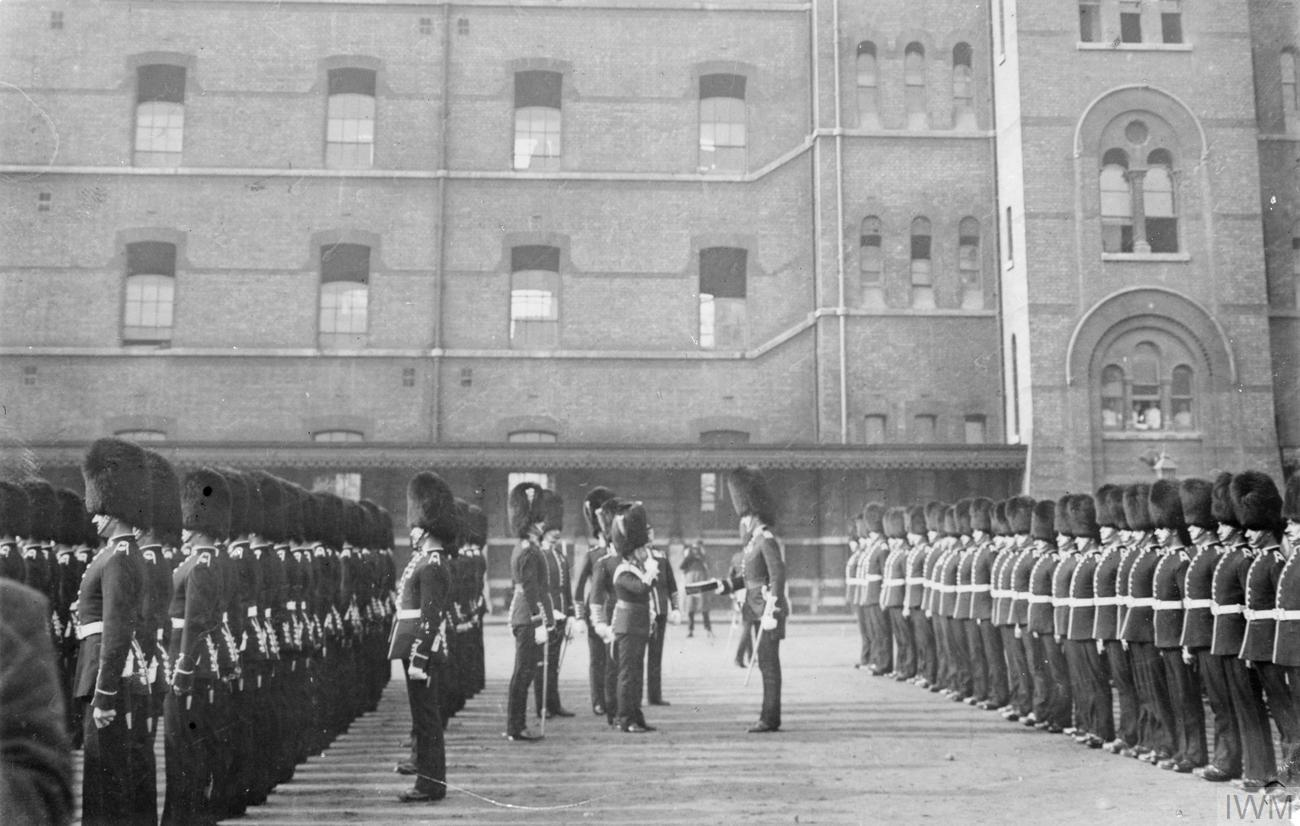
Lord Roberts presenting shamrock to the Irish Guards at Chelsea Barracks on 17 March 1904.

The Irish Guards was formed on 1 April 1900 by order of Queen Victoria to commemorate the Irish people who fought in the Second Boer War for the British Empire. This followed an initial suggestion from the Irish-born British Army officer Field Marshal Viscount Wolseley to allow soldiers in Irish Regiments to wear the shamrock in their headdress on St. Patrick's Day. This developed into a suggestion that an Irish Guards regiment should be created.

The Irish Guards' first honorary Colonel-of-the-Regiment was Field Marshal Lord Roberts, known to many troops as "Bobs". Because of this, the regiment gained the nickname "Bob's Own" but are now known affectionately as "The Micks" (although a generally derogatory term if used in society, this term is not seen as offensive or derogatory by the regiment.)

Roberts, as the new Commander-in-Chief in the Second Boer War, was too busy at the time to take over a new regiment, but he was appointed a Colonel of the regiment on 17 October 1900. Major Richard Joshua Cooper, of the 1st Battalion, Grenadier Guards, was appointed the first Commanding Officer on 2 May 1900 and 200 Irishmen from the same regiment were transferred as the nucleus of the new regiment. Selected members of the line infantry regiments were chosen to fill out the ranks of the new regiment.

The regiment's first Colours were presented by King Edward VII to the 1st Battalion on 30 May 1902 at Horse Guards Parade. A few Irish Guardsmen saw action as mounted infantry in the final stages of the Boer War. Otherwise, the Irish Guards were stationed in the United Kingdom for the first fourteen years of its existence, performing ceremonial duties in London during that time until the beginning of World War I.

== First World War ==
=== 1914-1915: Outbreak of War and the first battles on the Western Front ===
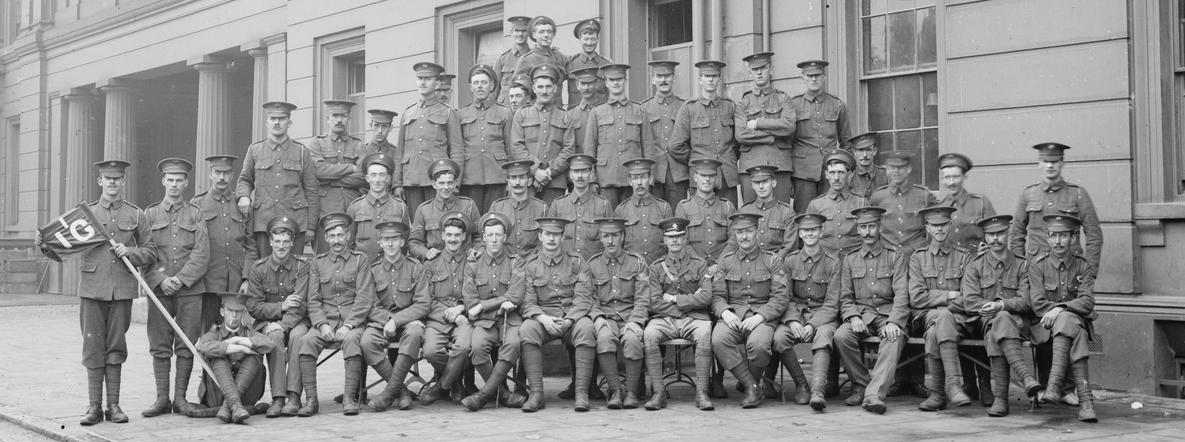
A platoon of the 1st Battalion, Irish Guards, pictured upon the outbreak of the First World War, 1914. Lieutenant Harold Alexander is seated seventh from the right.

The 1st Battalion, Irish Guards deployed to France, eight days after the United Kingdom had declared war upon the German Empire, as part of 4th (Guards) Brigade of the 2nd Division, and would remain on the Western Front for the duration of the war. The battalion took part in the Battle of Mons and the subsequent arduous and bloody Great Retreat. The Irish Guards was part of the rearguard during the retreat and took part in a small-scale action at Landrecies against the advancing Germans. The 1st Irish Guards also took part in another rearguard action at the woods near Villers-Cotterets, on 1 September, during the Battle of Le Cateau in which their Commanding Officer, Lieutenant-Colonel the Hon. George Morris and the Second-in-Command Major Hubert Crichton were killed. Le Cateau was a successful action that inflicted very heavy losses on the Germans and helped delay their advance towards Paris.

In August that year, the 2nd (Reserve) Battalion was raised at Warley Barracks to serve as a training battalion for the men needed to replace losses sustained by the 1st Battalion in France. The 1st Irish Guards later in September took part in the First Battle of the Marne and the advance towards the Aisne. The Irish Guards, having lost their Commanding Officer only a few weeks after they had reached France, would take part in one of the bloodiest battles of 1914, the First Battle of Ypres, which began on 19 October. The battle caused major casualties among the old Regular Army. The 1st Battalion was involved in fighting for the duration of the battle, taking part in the major actions, at Langemarck, Gheluvelt and Nonne Bosschen.

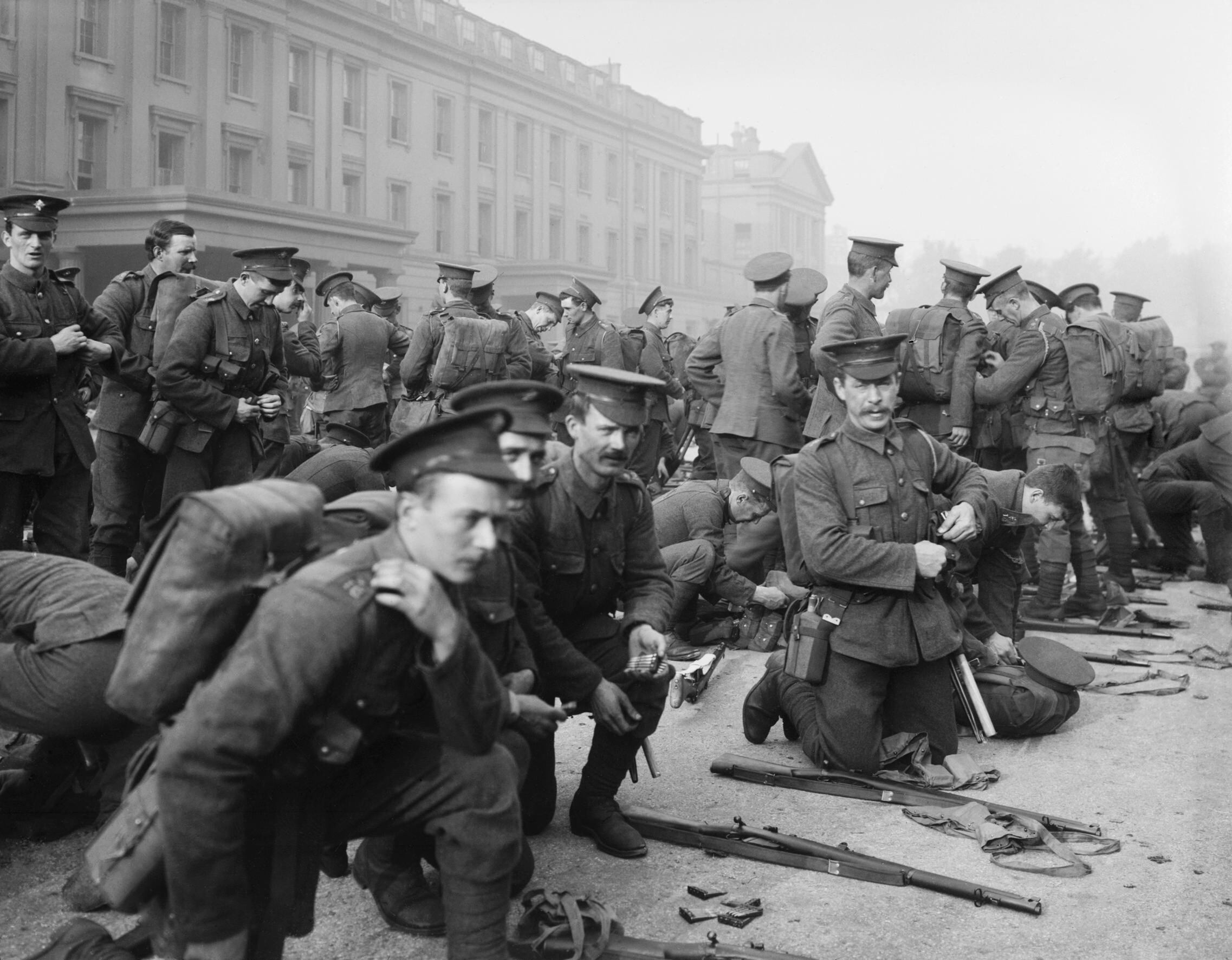
Men of the 1st Battalion, Irish Guards prepare to leave Wellington Barracks following the outbreak of the First World War, 6 August 1914.

The 1st Battalion suffered huge casualties between November 1–8 holding the line against near defeat by German forces, while defending Klein Zillebeke, with No. 3 Company suffering severe casualties on November 1 and No. 1 Company being caught in the open after a French retreat on November 6 exposed their flank, ensuring that at the end of the day "the greater part of them were missing". By the end of First Battle of Ypres on the 22 November, the battalion had suffered over 700 casualties and could only field two companies from the survivors. The 2nd Division, of which the 1st Irish Guards were part of, suffered 5,769 officers and men killed, wounded or missing in action. The original battalion of 1st Irish Guards which had arrived in France barely two months before had been practically wiped out and had to be reconstructed with new arrivals. The rest of 1914 and early 1915 was spent in the trenches with little action, although the soldiers were at risk from snipers and shells.

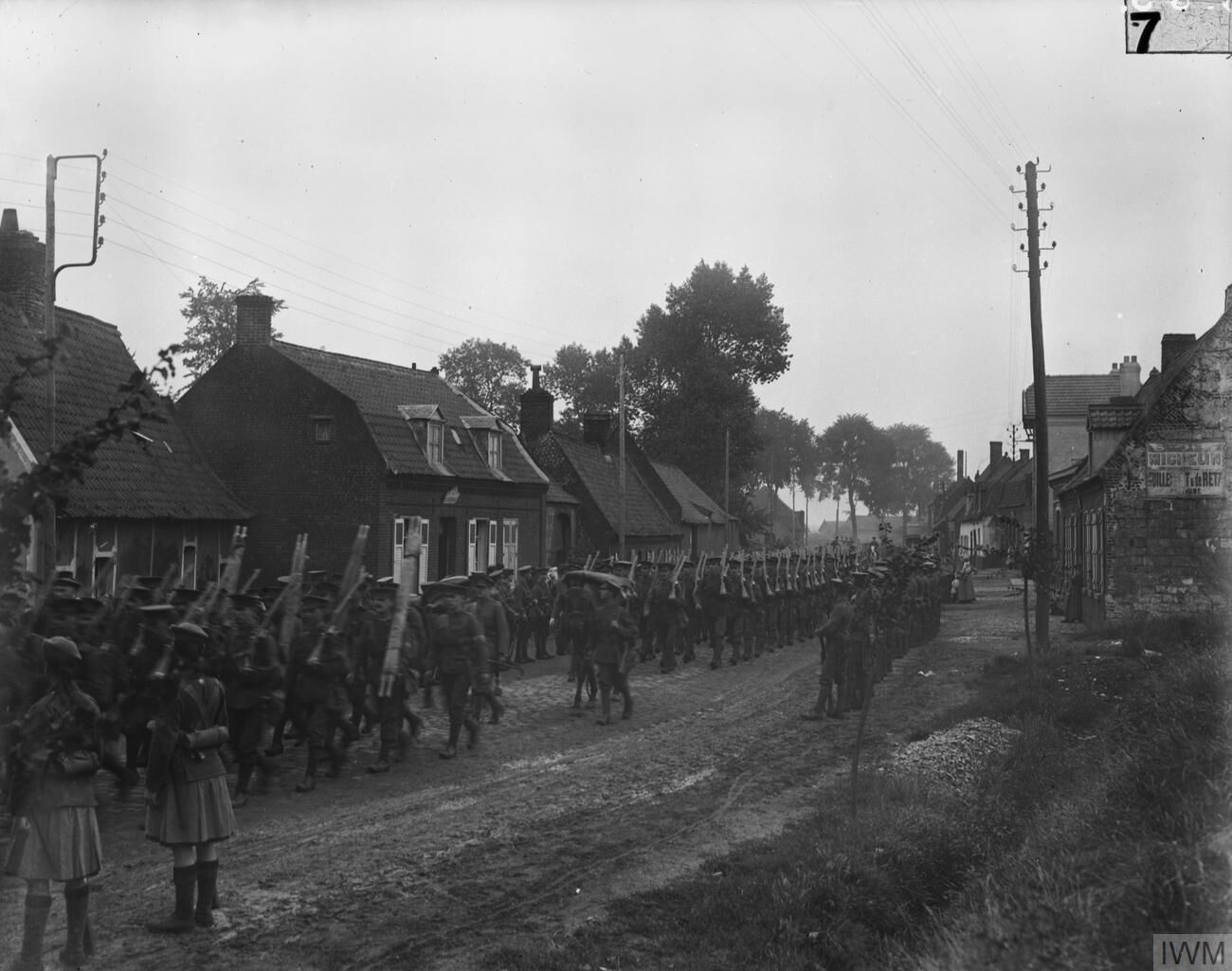
Men of the 1st Battalion, Irish Guards marching through a French village on the Western Front, August 1915.

In February 1915, Lance-Corporal Michael O'Leary performed an act of bravery at Cuinchy, where attack and counter-attack had been taking place between the British and Germans since 29 January until early February. On 1 February, O'Leary was part of a storming party which attacked an enemy barricade, during the attack the party suffered casualties and a group of the storming party then were hit by their own artillery bombardment. O'Leary rushed forward, shooting five Germans before attacking a further three in a machine-gun position at the next barricade, capturing two Germans in the process. The trench and many prisoners were taken thanks to the actions of O'Leary. He was awarded the Victoria Cross, the first VC the Irish Guards won in the war.

In May 1915, the 1st Irish Guards took part in the Battle of Festubert, though did not see much action. In July 1915, the 2nd (Reserve) Battalion was redesignated the 3rd (Reserve) Battalion, and another battalion, the 2nd Battalion Irish Guards was formed at Warley Barracks. In August that year the 1st Irish Guards, along with the rest of the 4th (Guards) Brigade, was moved to the Guards Division. The brigade was redesignated the 1st Guards Brigade. August 1915 also saw the arrival to France of 2nd Irish Guards who were subsequently attached to the 2nd Guards Brigade. In September that year, both battalions of the Irish Guards fought together for the first time in the Battle of Loos, which lasted from 25 September until early October.

=== 1916-17: The Battle of the Somme and Passchendaele ===
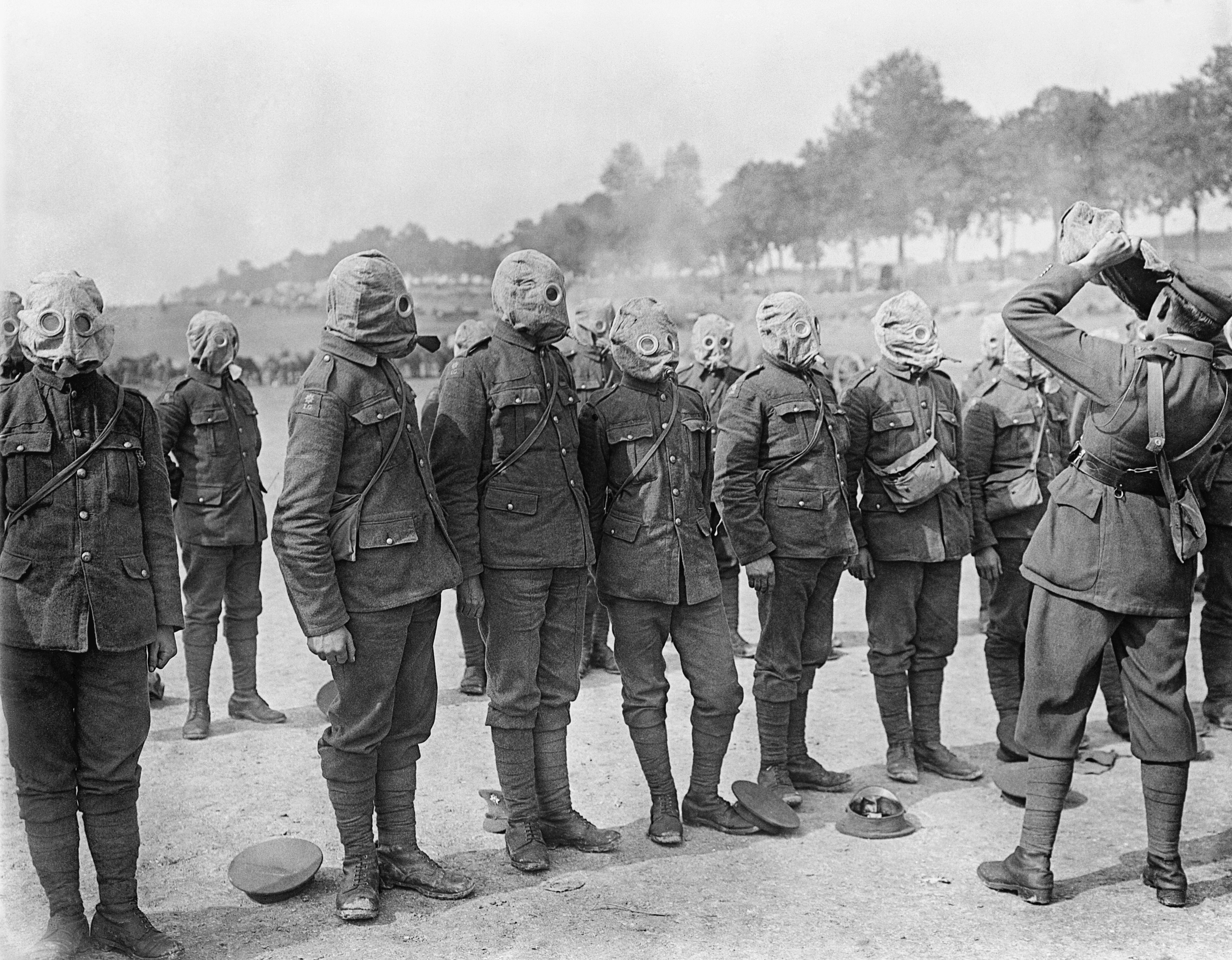
Troops of the Irish Guards during respirator drill, Battle of the Somme, 1916.

Both the 1st and 2nd Irish Guards spent much of the remainder of 1915 and early 1916 in the trenches until 1 July 1916 when the Battle of the Somme began, which was, and still is, the bloodiest day in the history of the British Army, but the 1st Irish Guards were spared the day's bloodshed as they were held in reserve. The 1st Irish Guards were soon called into the fray at the Battle of Flers–Courcelette where they suffered severe casualties in the attack in the face of withering fire from the German machine-guns. The battalion then went on to take part in the Battle of Morval. They were involved in the capture of the northern part of the village on 25 September and were relieved the following day by the 2nd Irish Guards. The 1st Irish Guards suffered quite heavily during the Morval engagement with over 250 casualties. The 2nd Irish Guards fought until 28 September when they too were relieved and entered into a period of rest along with the rest of the Guard's Division.

The Irish Guards had been brought back up to strength sufficiently during their rest period so that by the summer of 1917 they would once again be called on to front a major British offensive with the start of the Battle of Passchendaele. The 2nd Irish Guards were the first to enter the Battle of Pilckem which began on 31 July and despite taking heavy casualties, including their Commanding Officer, achieved their objectives in the face of heavy German resistance.

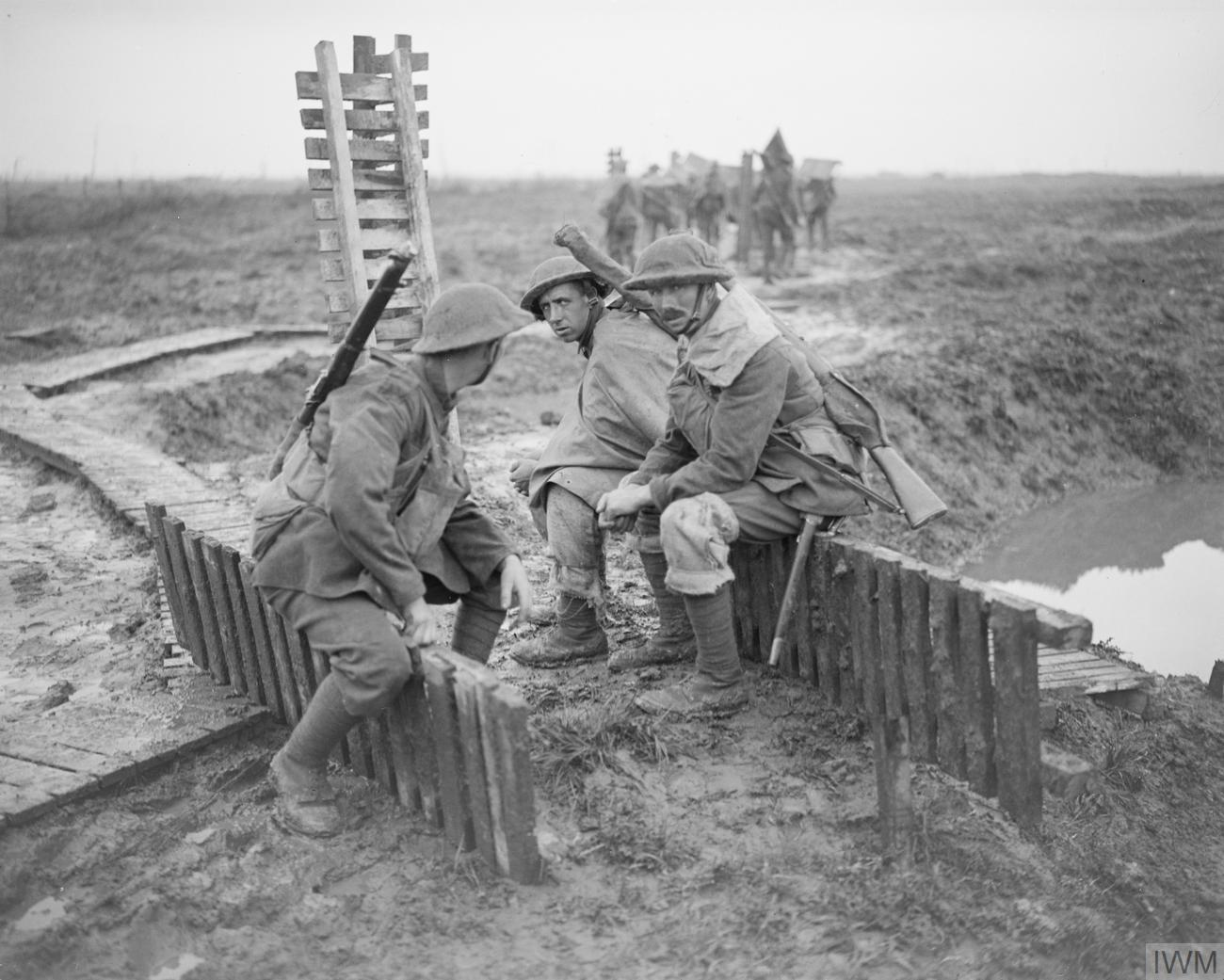
Soldiers of the 2nd Battalion, Irish Guards resting during the Battle of Passchendaele, 10 October 1917.

1st Irish Guards spent the first day of the offensive in reserve before joining their sister battalion on 1 September. Further actions took place for the 1st Irish Guards at the Battle of the Menin Road Ridge, where they beat off several German counterattacks, and at the Battle of Poelcapelle, during which the battalion lost every one of its company commanders although 2nd Irish Guards suffered few casualties.

In a testament to the ferocity of fighting that the Irish Guards faced at the Battle of Passchendaele, an action took place on 12 September that would see two members of the regiment win the Victoria Cross. Lance-Sergeant John Moyney and Private Thomas Woodcock of the 2nd Battalion, Irish Guards, were part of an advance post that became surrounded by Germans. During the defence, the Lance-Sergeant attacked the advancing Germans with grenades and with his lewis gun. He, and his men, then charged the Germans, breaking through them and reaching a stream where he and Private Woodcock formed a rearguard while the rest of the party withdrew. They subsequently began to withdraw, crossing the stream, but Private Woodcock heard cries for help and he returned, retrieving the wounded man and carrying him back to British lines under machine-gun fire. They had held out for ninety-six hours.

The Irish Guards took part in the Battle of Cambrai, the first large use of the tank in battle took place during the engagement. The 1st Irish Guards initially enjoyed a quiet sector for the opening of the battle until 30 November when they suffered heavy casualties fighting through the streets of the village of Gouzeaucourt. The Guards Division, and with it the 1st and 2nd Irish Guards, were pulled off the line on 6 December for a rest period, having fought almost continuously since the start of August.

=== 1918: Final victory and the ending of the War ===
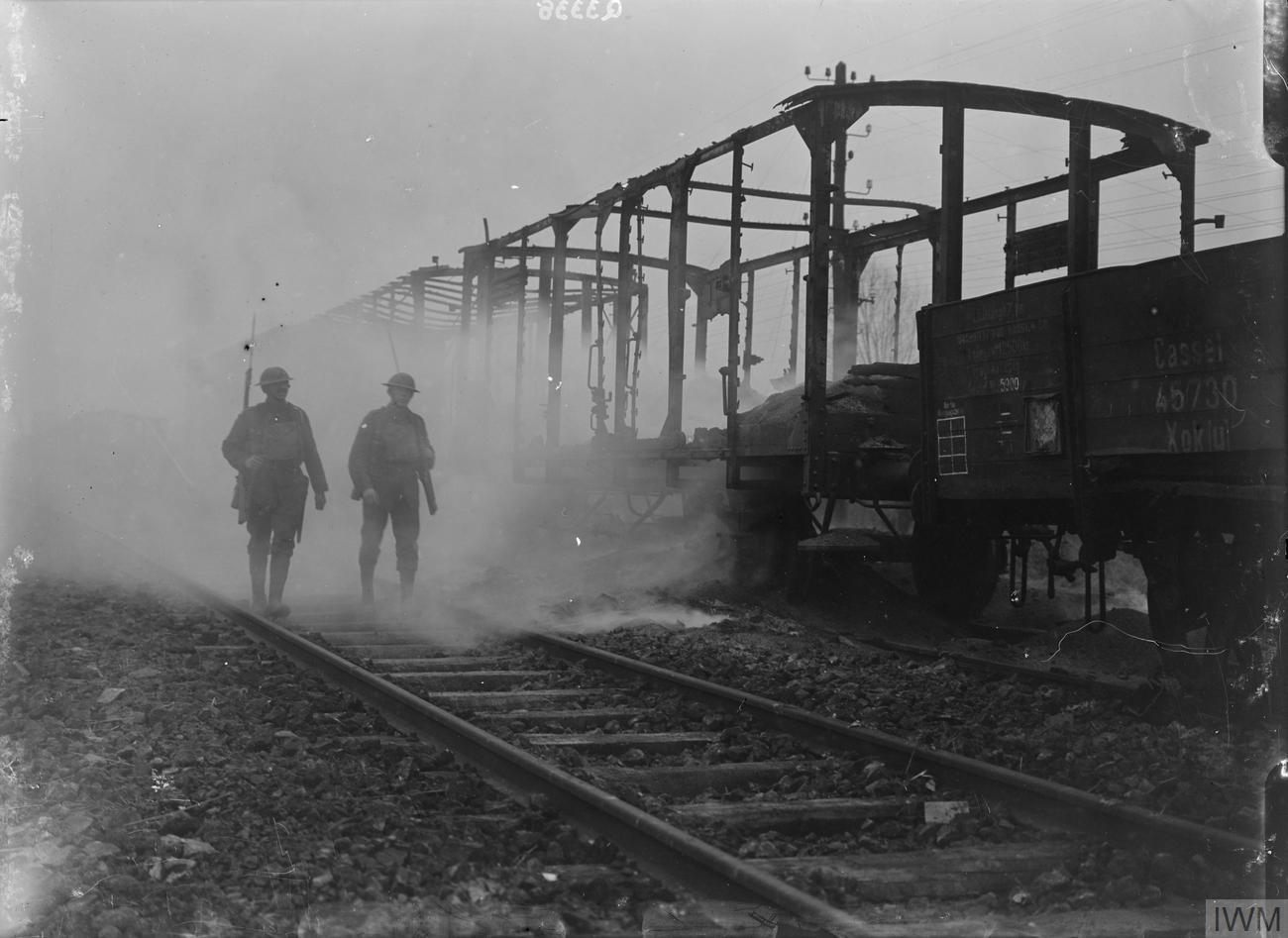
Irish Guards pass a railway carriage set on fire by the retreating Germans.

The regiment enjoyed the relative respite provided by the stalemate that the Western Front experienced in early 1918. This respite, however, was going to be short lived with a major German offensive expected. This great German offensive, termed the Spring Offensive, began on 21 March 1918 with the launching of Operation Michael. The 1st Irish Guards were ordered to join the fight on the night of 21 March once the British realised how serious the situation had become and the battalion found themselves forming the rearguard for a retreating army on the defensive for the first time since the opening stages of the war four years previously. The 2nd Irish Guards, who had been in reserve to meet the expected German offensive, were ordered to create a defensive line east of Boisleux-Saint-Marc in an attempt to stem the German advance. The men of the 2nd Irish Guards would continue a fighting withdrawal for ten days until, finally, the German offensive ran out of momentum and the battalion were relieved from the line on 31 March. The failed German offensive marked the beginning of the end of the war but the Irish Guards would fight in a number of engagements before its finish, including at the Battle of Arras and the Battle of Albert. The regiment also took part in a number of battles during the British offensives against the Hindenburg Line.

On 4 November 1918 at the Sambre-Oise Canal, Acting Lieutenant Colonel James Marshall of the Irish Guards but attached to the 16th (Service) Battalion, Lancashire Fusiliers, organised repair parties who were trying to repair a damaged partly finished bridge. The first party soon came under fire and all were killed or wounded. Marshall, disregarding his own safety, stood on the bank, encouraging and helping the men as they worked on the bridge.

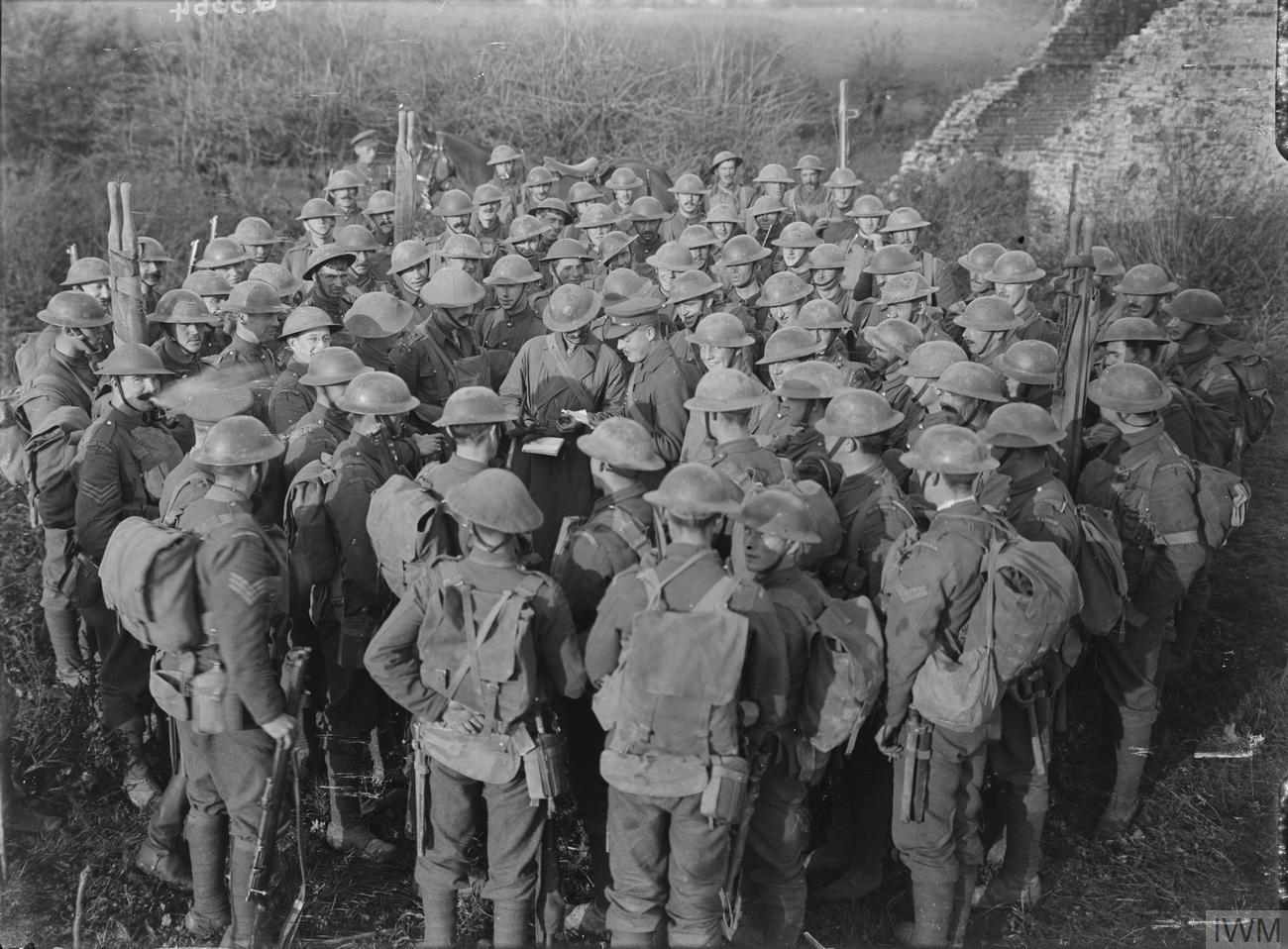
Irish Guardsmen reading news of the Armistice at the conclusion of the First World War.

Once it was repaired, he began to lead his men across the bridge but was shot and killed. He was awarded the posthumous Victoria Cross, the fourth and final to be earned by the Irish Guards during the First World War.

Throughout October and early November, the Irish Guards took place in the last advances on the Western Front against the crumbling German Army. On 11 November 1918 the Armistice with Germany was signed. The 1st Battalion, Irish Guards were at Maubeuge when the Armistice was signed, which was near to where the Irish Guards began their war in 1914 at Mons, although by 11 November there were few surviving Irish Guardsmen of that first battle. The sacrifice by the Irish Guards during the First World War had been immense. The two battalions of Irish Guards had suffered 2,349 officers and men killed and well over 5,000 wounded. The regiment was awarded 406 medals, including four Victoria Crosses, during the Great War.

Among those killed serving with the Irish Guards in the First World War was Second Lieutenant John Kipling, the 18-year-old son of author Rudyard Kipling, who was listed as missing during the Battle of Loos in September 1915. (Note: It was claimed that his grave was identified in 1992, though this is disputed.) In tribute to his son's regiment, Kipling composed the poem "The Irish Guards" and after the war wrote a two-volume history of the regiment's service in the war.

== Inter-War ==
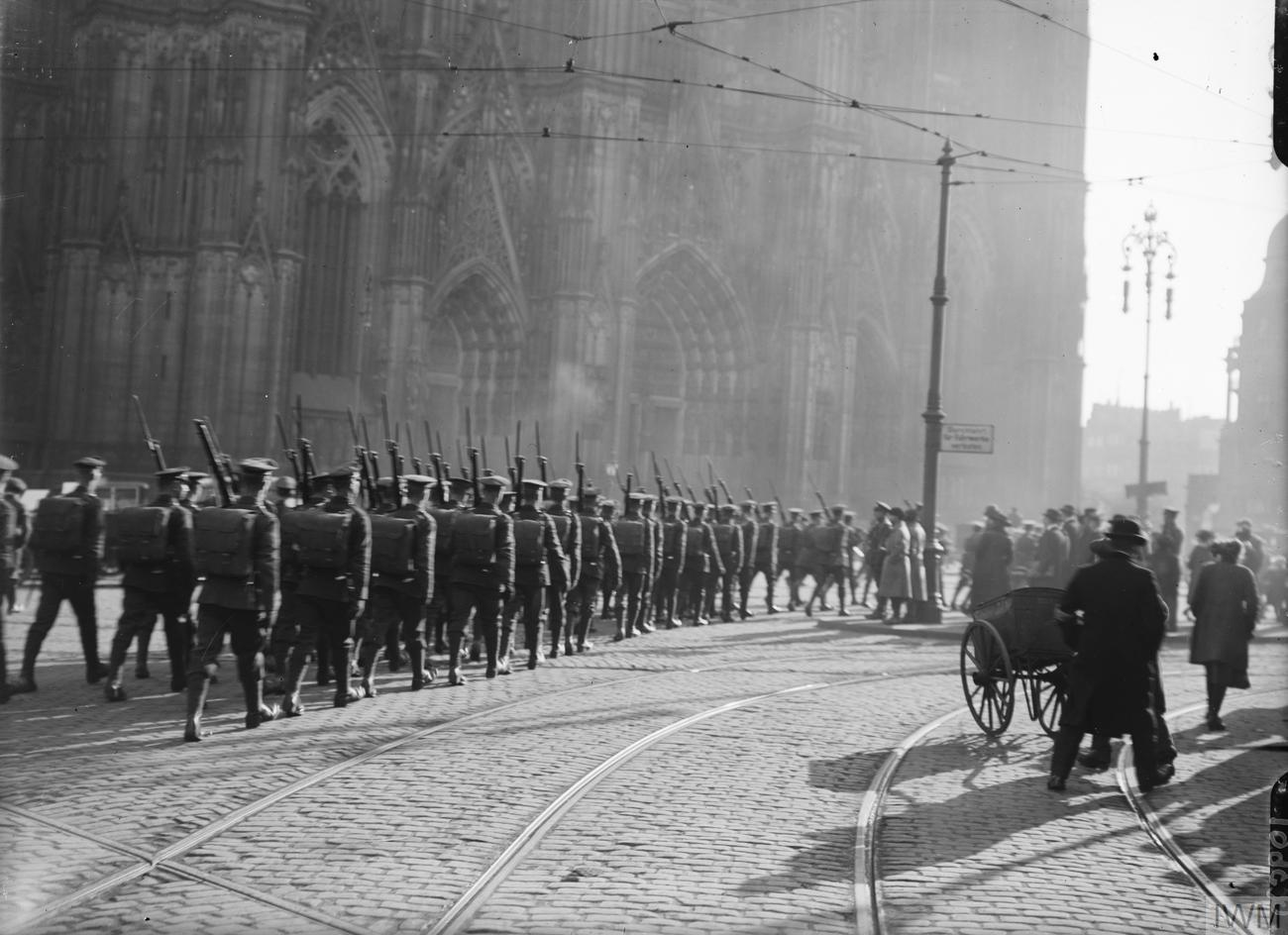
Irish Guards passing the Cologne Cathedral during the Allied occupation of Germany, February 1919.

With the First World War at an end, occupation duties awaited the Irish Guards and on 11 December 1918 the regiment marched into Germany, drums beating, as part of the British Army of the Rhine. Both battalions returned to Britain victoriously in the spring of 1919 and after a final parade through London, the 2nd and 3rd Irish Guards were now surplus to requirements and disbanded. In 1920, for St Patrick's Day, the regiment donned its full-dress for the first time since before the outbreak of World War I. The regiment was also compelled to cope with the internal tensions caused by the political situation back home in Ireland following the end of the First World War although the regiment remained largely detached from the events of the Irish War of Independence, with only one member of the Irish Guards being charged with trying to smuggle weapons to republicans and even this act was motivated by a desire for monetary gain rather than political motives.

The regiment's continued existence was threatened briefly when Winston Churchill (later destined to become the Prime Minister), who served as Secretary of State for War between 1919 and 1921, sought the elimination of the Irish Guards and Welsh Guards as an economy measure. This proposal, however, did not find favour in government or Army circles and was dropped.

In 1922 the regiment deployed to Constantinople as part of an allied force during the troubles in that region. In late 1923 the regiment deployed to the garrison at Gibraltar. They returned to the United Kingdom in 1924. They were then based in the south of England until 1936 when they deployed to Egypt. While stationed there, the regiment deployed to Palestine for a number of months on internal security duties against Arab militants. The regiment returned to the United Kingdom in 1938 as war with Germany looked increasingly likely. The following year the 2nd Battalion of the Irish Guards was re-formed five months before World War II began.

== Second World War ==
=== Norwegian Campaign and retreat from North-West Europe ===
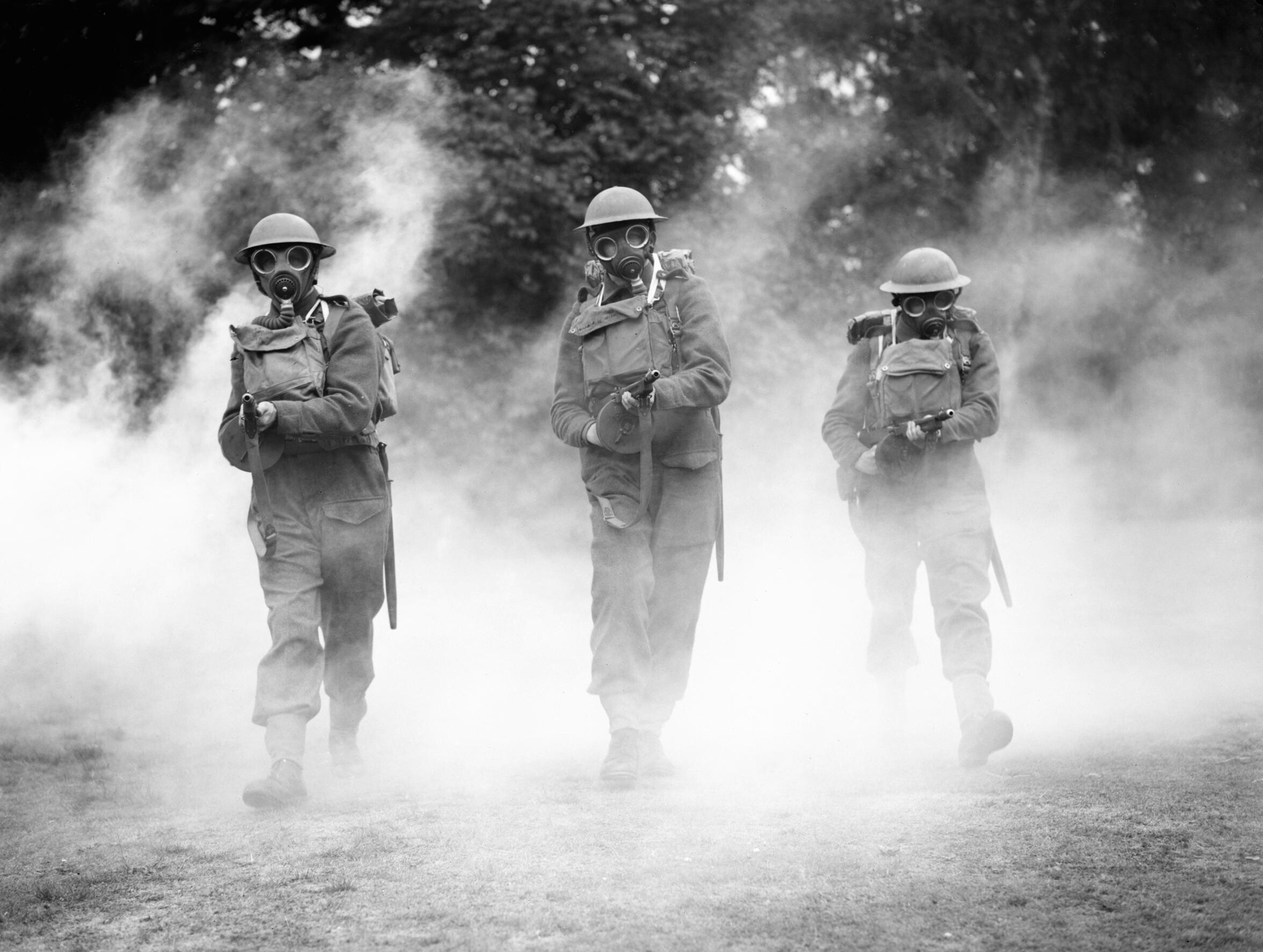
Irish Guardsmen wearing gasmasks advance through smoke with 'tommy guns' at the ready, Nooks Head near Woking in Surrey, 8 July 1940.

Upon the outbreak of war in September 1939, both battalions of the Irish Guards were based in the United Kingdom. In April 1940, the 1st Battalion deployed to Norway as part of the 24th (Guards) Brigade. In May the brigade HQ and the 1st Irish Guards was aboard the Polish liner/troopship Chrobry, being transported to the northern Norwegian town of Bodø from another area of Norway. Chrobry was attacked by German Heinkel He 111 bombers which killed many men, including the commanding officer (CO), the second-in-command, the adjutant and three of the five company commanders of the 1st Irish Guards, as well as all their heavy equipment. Fire engulfed the ship and, considering the amount of ammunition on board, an immense explosion seemed imminent. However, the surviving Guardsmen were rescued by escorting vessels.

Later that month the battalion fought in northern Norway, seeing action at Pothus, where they held out against heavy German attacks for two days until they were finally forced to withdraw as their positions were being outflanked. The brigade HQ and battalion were withdrawn by boat, though they left many men behind, who managed to break through the German forces and reach Allied lines later that day. With the situation worsening for the British in the Battle of France, it was decided to withdraw all British forces from Norway and the 1st Irish Guards were evacuated back to the United Kingdom with the rest of the expeditionary force in June.

In May 1940, the 2nd Battalion, Irish Guards deployed to the Hook of Holland to cover the evacuation of the Dutch Royal Family and Government. The battalion returned to the United Kingdom the day after the evacuation, but had only a short respite, for just a few days later they, along with the Welsh Guards, crossed over to the northern French port of Boulogne, reaching the town on 22 May. Their orders were to defend part of Boulogne during the evacuation of the British Expeditionary Force (BEF) from the overwhelming and inexorable advance of the Germans. The Guards stoutly defended their area of responsibility from better-equipped German forces, repulsing a number of German attacks on the 22nd, but on the morning of the 23rd, superior German forces attacked the battalion and the Guards suffered very heavily. Later that day the battalion was evacuated from Boulogne, being the last to leave and having fought valiantly while awaiting evacuation.

In 1941, 2nd Irish Guards made regimental history when they were reorganised as an armoured battalion, the first in the Irish Guard's history, joining the newly formed Guards Armoured Division as part of 5th Guards Armoured Brigade. The Training Battalion of the Irish Guards was raised the same year, later becoming the 3rd Battalion, Irish Guards. In 1943, the 3rd Irish Guards were reorganised as a full infantry battalion and followed their sister regiment into the Guards Armoured Division as part of the 32nd Guards Brigade.

=== North Africa and Italy ===
In March 1943 the 1st Battalion, Irish Guards, who had been based in the United Kingdom since their return from Norway in June 1940, landed, with the rest of the 24th Guards Brigade, in Tunisia, to fight in the final stages of the campaign in North Africa. The battalion fought in the Medjez Plain area, seeing heavy action at Djebel bou Aoukaz, or 'Bou'. The 1st Irish Guards were tasked with capturing a vital ridge and part of the area was taken on 27 April but further fighting continued for several days with the Irish Guards beating off several German counterattacks and suffering heavy casualties before they were relieved on 1 May.

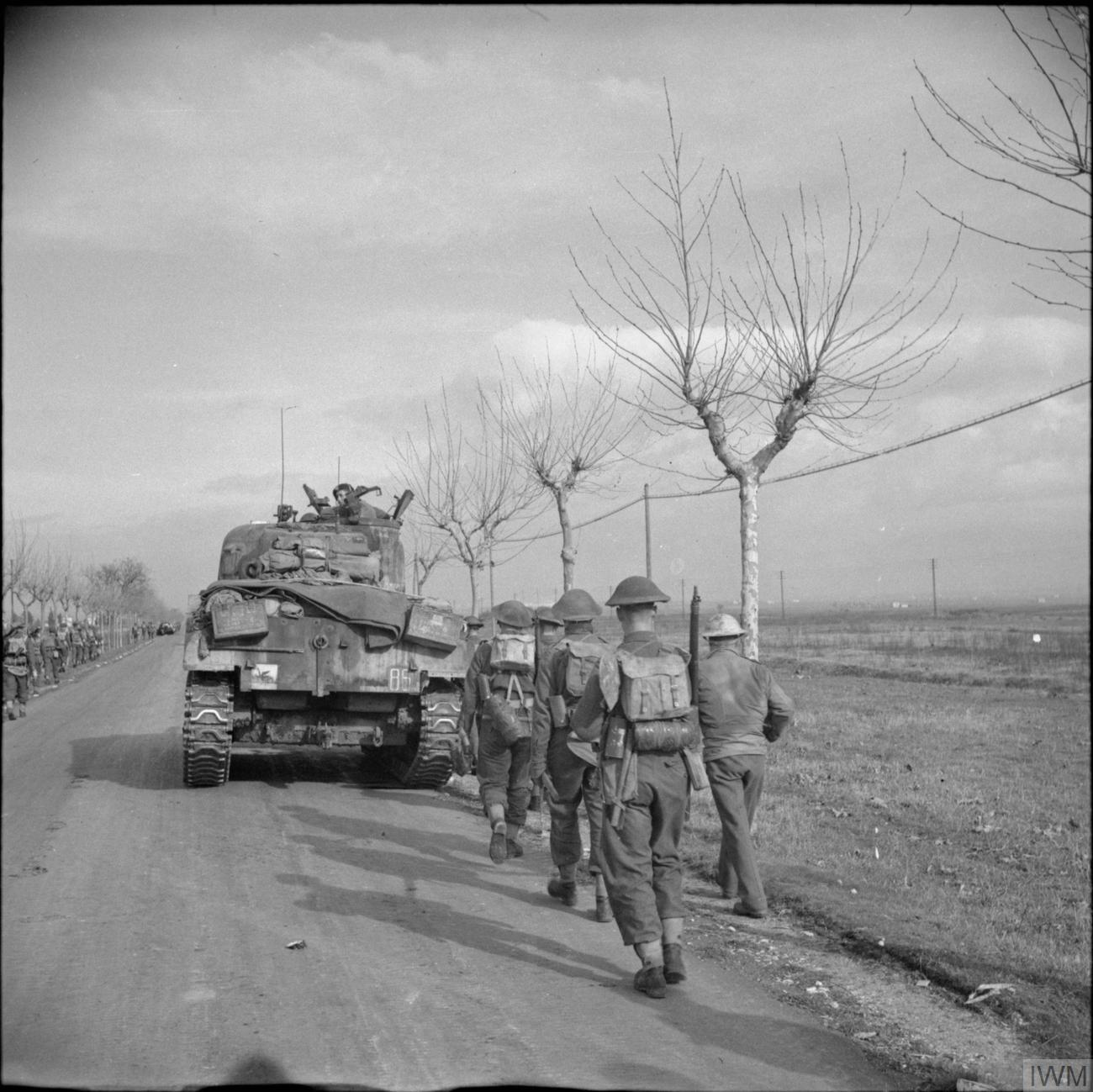
Irish Guardsmen advancing north of Anzio supported by Sherman tanks of the 46th (Liverpool Welsh) Royal Tank Regiment during the Italian Campaign, 25 January 1944.

It was in this fierce fighting which marked the Irish Guard's Tunisian Campaign that the regiment would win their first Victoria Cross of the Second World War. During an action on 28 April, Lance-Corporal John Patrick Kenneally of the 1st Irish Guards charged down the forward slope of the ridge on which his company was positioned, attacking the main body of a German company preparing to assault the ridge. He fired his Bren LMG as he advanced, causing so much surprise and confusion that the Germans broke in disorder and retreated. Lance-Corporal Kenneally then returned to his position unharmed. On 30 April Lance-Corporal Kenneally repeated his brave actions when, accompanied by a sergeant of the Reconnaissance Corps, he charged the enemy who were again forming up to assault the same ridge. Both men charged the Germans, inflicting heavy casualties on the Germans which resulted in the rout of the German force. The two men began to return to their position but as they did so, Kenneally was hit in the thigh. However, he continued to fight, refusing to relinquish his Bren gun or leave his position. Despite his wound he fought for the rest of the day and for his actions was awarded the Victoria Cross.

Sixty hand-picked men of the Irish Guards were part of the 14,000 strong British contingent that took part in the victory parade in the capital Tunis on 20 May 1943. The 1st Irish Guards did not have much time to bask on their victories in North Africa however when in December of that year they were, together with the rest of the 24th Guards Brigade, deployed to the Italian Front.

The battalion took part in the Anzio landings (codenamed Operation Shingle) as one of the first units to land in Italy on 22 January 1944. The landings were met by stronger than expected resistance as the Allied armies moved inland and a German counterattack was launched several days later. The Allies were soon driven back to the beachhead where fierce fighting raged and the 1st Irish Guards saw action at Carroceto where they repulsed several German attacks. The battalion also took part in the attack on Campoleone, where they experienced heavy casualties. The Irish Guards inflicted heavy casualties on the Germans, but were surrounded the following day with little support against German armour, and were forced to fight their way through to Allied lines, suffering many casualties in the process. A few further actions took place for the battalion's companies but, by April, the 1st Irish Guards, having suffered devastating losses, had been severely depleted in manpower and were returned to the UK along with the remainder of the 24th Guards Brigade. Back in the UK, it was decided that the 1st Irish Guards would become the regiment's training battalion in order to provide manpower to the 2nd and 3rd Irish Guards who would soon be undertaking the invasion of Europe.

=== Landing in Normandy, Market Garden and the advance to Germany ===
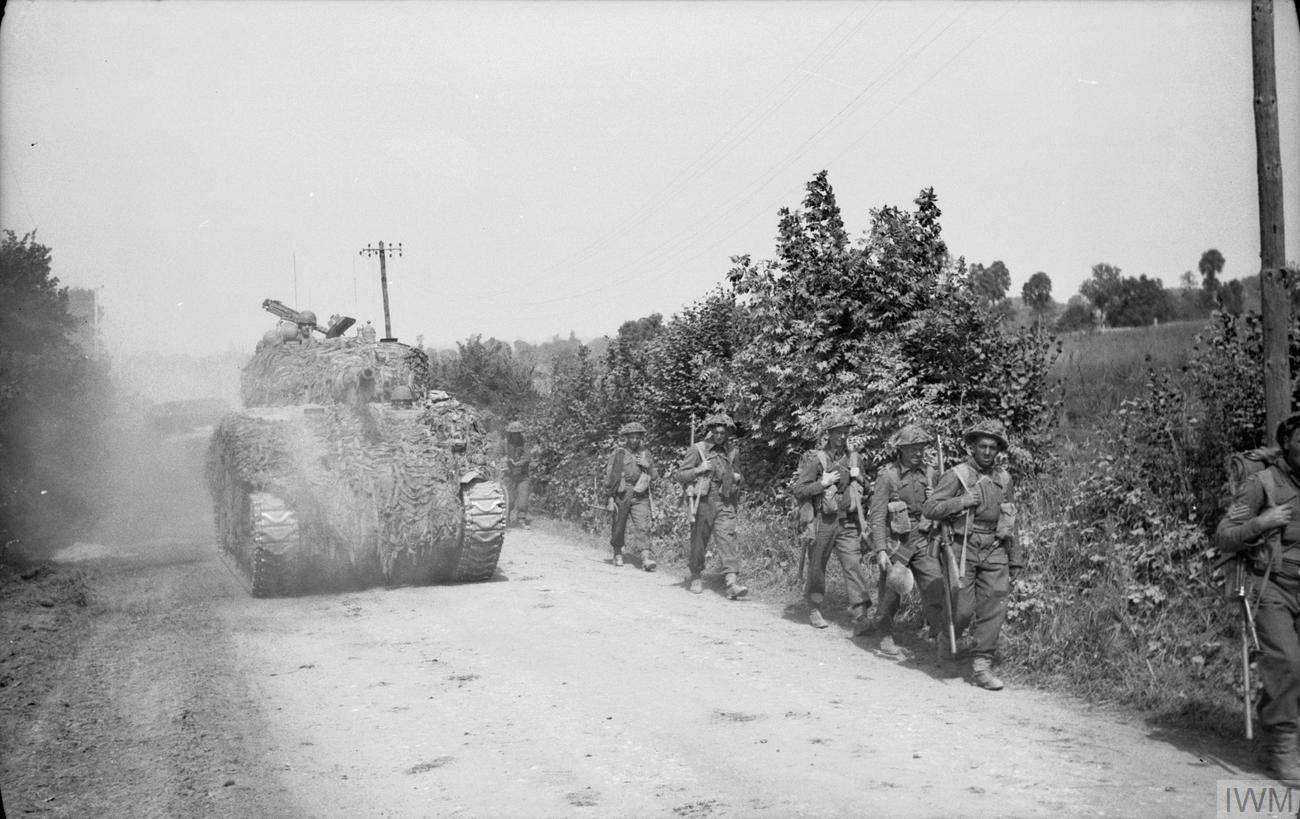
A Sherman tank and infantry of the Irish Guards advance along a road near St Martin-des-Besaces during Operation Bluecoat, 1 August 1944.

Following the Normandy landings on 6 June 1944, the 2nd and 3rd Irish Guards were landed in France on 25 June to take part in the Normandy Campaign. The Irish Guards, as part of the Guards Armoured Division, took part in Operation Goodwood (18–20 July). The Division's objective was Cagny, Vimont and the surrounding area. During 18 July 1944, near Cagny, Lieutenant (later Sir) John Gorman of the 2nd Battalion, Irish Guards was in his Sherman tank when he was confronted by a far superior German Tiger II or 'King Tiger'. Gorman's tank fired one shot at the Tiger II, but the shot bounced off its thick armour. The Sherman's gun jammed before a second shot could be fired, and Gorman then gave the order to ram the Tiger II just as it was beginning to turn its massive 88mm gun on his tank. The Sherman smashed into the Tiger II, the collision disabling both tanks. The crews of both tanks then bailed out. Lieutenant Gorman, once he had seen his crew to safety, returned to the scene in a commandeered Sherman Firefly and destroyed the King Tiger. He was awarded the Military Cross for his actions, while the driver from his own crew, Lance-Corporal James Baron, won the Military Medal. The Irish Guards were involved in the further fighting that raged around Cagny for the rest of the day. Cagny, devastated by heavy bombing, was finally liberated by the Guards on the morning of 19 July. The Irish Guards also saw action in Operation Bluecoat launched on 30 July which saw the British capture the strategically important high ground around the Mont Pincon area. Following the breakout from Normandy and rapid advance through the more open French terrain, the 2nd and 3rd Irish Guards crossed the River Seine on 29 August and began the advance into Belgium with the rest of the Guards Armoured Division towards Brussels which was liberated on 3 September.

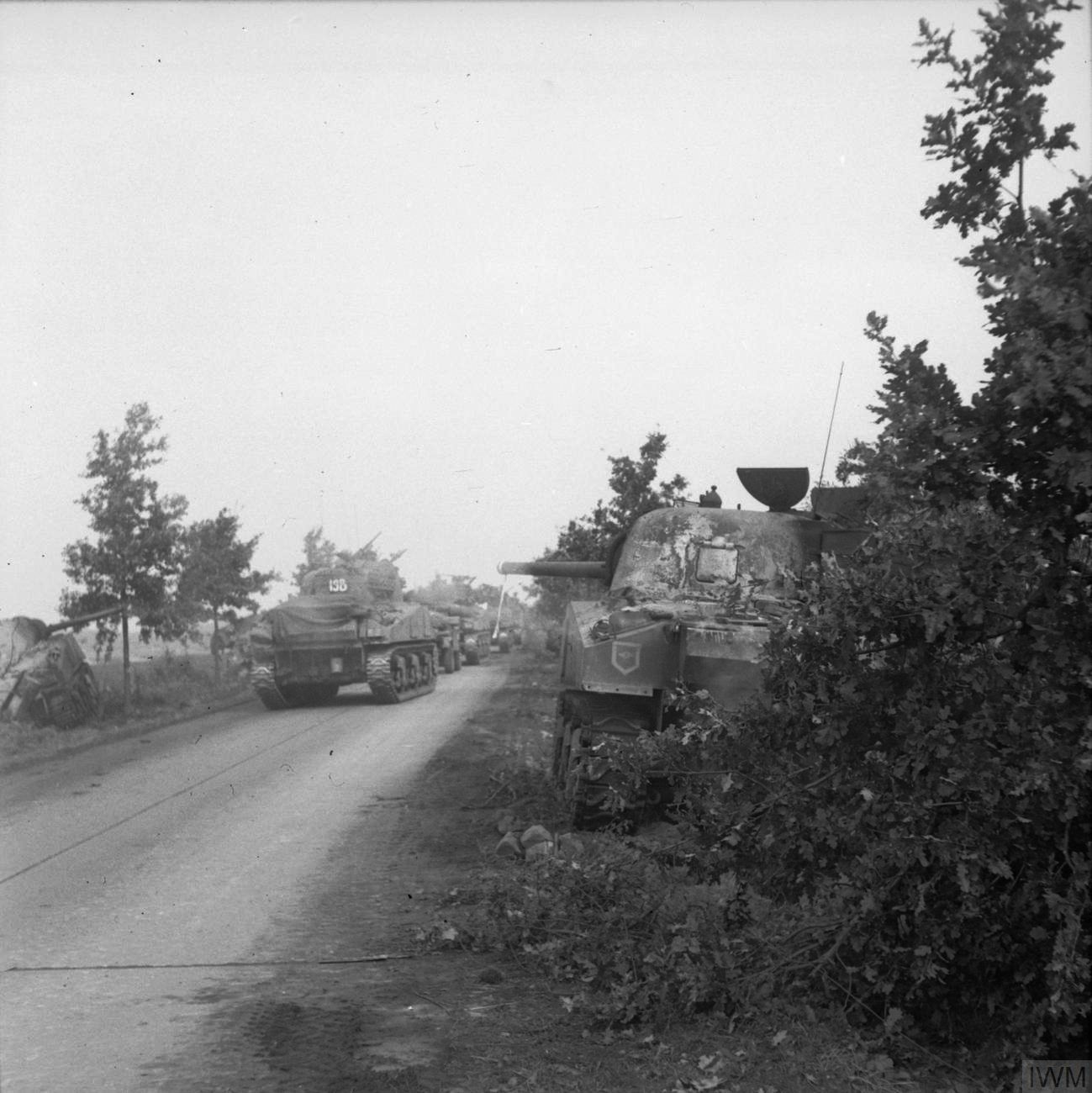
Sherman tanks of the 2nd Battalion, Irish Guards advance past previously destroyed ones in the initial stage of Operation Market Garden on 17 September 1944.

Following the liberation of Brussels, the Irish Guards pushed into north-east Belgium in the face of stiffening resistance and reached the Dutch border on the evening of 10 September, capturing the strategically vital Joe's Bridge in a daring surprise assault. The Irish Guards were then chosen to be part of the ground force of Operation Market Garden, 'Market' being the airborne assault and 'Garden' the ground attack, which one of the most ambitious operations of the entire war and designed to enable a swift advance into Germany by capturing vital bridges over the River Rhine. The Irish Guards Group were commanded by Lieutenant-Colonel "JOE" Vandeleur. The 2nd Irish Guards led XXX Corps in their advance towards Arnhem, which was the objective of the British 1st Airborne Division, furthest from XXX Corps' start line.

Operation Market Garden opened on the afternoon of 17 September with the dropping of three Allied Airborne divisions behind the German line. XXX Corps crossed the Belgian-Dutch border 15:00 hours, advancing from Neerpelt, but met very heavy resistance from German forces prepared with anti-tank weapons and most of the tanks in the initial troops were hit and destroyed. After Hawker Typhoons were called in to provide the Irish Guards aerial support, the Guardsmen moved forward to clear the German positions, manned by elements from two German parachute battalions and two battalions of the 9th SS Panzer Division and soon routed the German forces flanking the road. The fighting soon died down and the Irish Guards were able to advance and occupy Valkenswaard Despite the progress of XXX Corps, the unexpected resistance meant that the advance was already much slower than planned. Early on 18 September, reconnaissance units of the Guards Armoured Division made contact with the U.S. 101st Airborne Division who had liberated Eindhoven, with the rest of XXX Corps reaching the city later that day. The Irish Guards now camped outside Son while the Royal Engineers built a Bailey bridge over the Wilhelmina Canal so that XXX Corps could advance to Nijmegen. The bridge was completed early on 19 September and XXX Corps continued their advance. Later that day the Guards Division, still led by the 2nd Irish Guards, reached Nijmegen where the U.S. 82nd Airborne Division was located. Their advance had to be halted, however, for the 82nd had failed to take the bridge due to heavy German resistance. The bridge was finally captured on the evening of the 20th but the Irish Guards and the rest of the Guards Armoured Division were now scattered over 25 square miles trying to secure Nijmegen itself and defend their rear from constant German attacks. On the 21st, the British 1st Airborne Division at Arnhem, heavily outnumbered and outgunned, had to surrender after many days fighting that saw true heroism and courage. XXX Corps had been just an hour from the bridge at Arnhem but had to wait for the arrival of the 43rd (Wessex) Infantry Division before they could advance. The Irish Guards took part in further fighting until 25 September when the remnants of the 1st Airborne Division were evacuated across the Rhine.

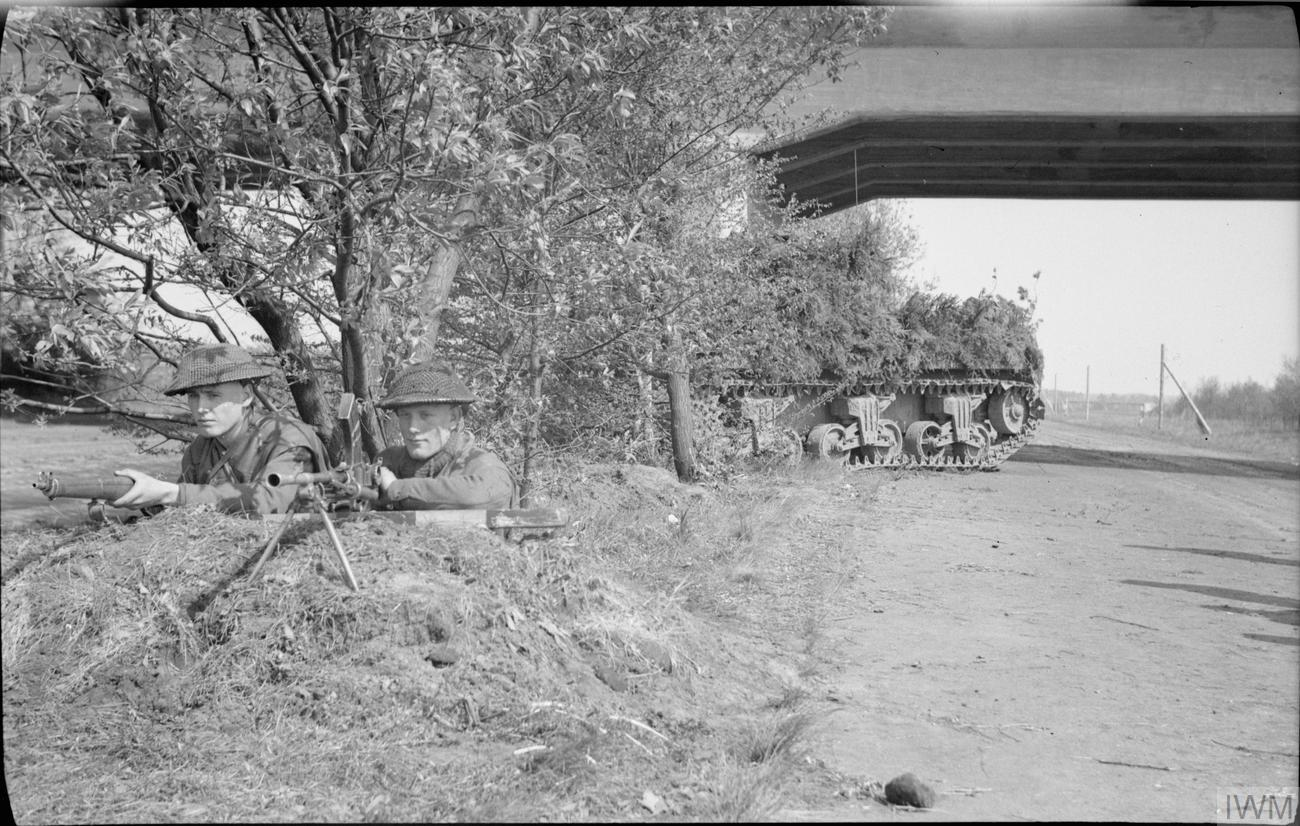
Two Irish Guardsmen and a camouflaged Sherman Firefly guard a section of the Bremen-Hamburg autobahn, 20 April 1945.

The Irish Guards remained in the Netherlands until the Allied advance into Germany was launched, seeing heavy action during the Rhineland Campaign. On 21 April 1945, at the village of Wistedt in northern Germany, Guardsman Edward Charlton of the 2nd Battalion, Irish Guards, was a co-driver of a tank during the capture of the village by a small force of the Irish Guards. The Germans soon attempted to retake the village with numerically superior forces, consisting mostly of officer cadets under the command of very experienced instructor officers as well as two or three self-propelled guns. Three of the four tanks of the Irish Guards force were knocked out, while the fourth (Charlton's) was disabled by a complete electrical failure before the action started. When the tank was disabled, Guardsman Charlton was ordered to dismount the turret 0.50 Browning machine gun and support the infantry, who were in danger of being overrun by the Germans. Charlton took the machine gun from his disabled tank and advanced in full view of the attacking Germans, firing and inflicting heavy casualties on them, halting their lead company and allowing the rest of the Guards to reorganise and retire. Charlton, despite having one arm shattered, continued firing until he collapsed from a further wound and loss of blood. His courageous and selfless disregard for his own safety helped most of the Irish Guards to escape capture. He later died of the wounds he had received and was awarded a posthumous Victoria Cross, the last VC of the European theatre, and the last, so far, of the Irish Guards. Unusually, much of the citation for the award of the VC was based on German accounts of the fight as most of his later actions were not witnessed by any Guards officers or surviving non-commissioned officers.

With the signing of the final German surrender on 9 May 1945, the Irish Guard's war had finally come to an end. For the second time in barely a generation, the Irish Guards had served throughout a world war with distinction and sacrifice with the regiment losing over 700 men killed, 1,500 wounded and being awarded 252 gallantry medals, including two Victoria Crosses.

== 1945 – present day ==
=== End of Empire and the Cold War in Europe ===
The end of the Second World War signaled the inevitable downsizing of the British Army and the demobilisation of its wartime strength which led to the 3rd Irish Guards being disbanded in 1946 and the 2nd doing so the following year. The ending of the Second World War had also signaled the beginning of the end for the British Empire and over the next decades the Irish Guards would find themselves serving in conflicts throughout Britain's withdrawal from its remaining colonies. In 1947, the 1st Irish Guards deployed abroad for the first time since 1944, heading for troubled Palestine to perform internal security duties there against the Jewish insurgency in Mandatory Palestine. Following the British withdrawal from Palestine in May 1948, the battalion moved to Tripoli, Libya for a year before returning home to the UK in 1949. Faced with the new reality of the Cold War tensions with the Soviet Union in Europe, the Irish Guards joined the British Army of the Rhine (BAOR) in West Germany in 1951, remaining there until 1953. After returning to the UK, the Irish Guards participated in ceremonial duty for the Coronation of Elizabeth II before it was posted to the Suez Canal Zone in Egypt, remaining there until the British withdrawal in 1956.

It was not long before the Irish Guards would find themselves in another trouble spot of Britain's declining Empire when they were deployed to Cyprus to once again perform vital internal security duties due to the EOKA campaign against the British forces as well as the tension, indeed violence, that was occurring between Greek and Turkish Cypriots. They returned to Britain in the closing months of that year before once again joining the BAOR in 1961 when they were moved back to West Germany. In 1966, the regiment was deployed to Aden, another colony experiencing violence with the Radfan Uprising against British rule. During their tour of Aden, the Irish Guards experienced some of the fiercest fighting they had seen since the Second World War. The Irish Guards returned home to the UK just before Aden gained independence from the British Empire in 1967.

In 1970 the Irish Guards were posted to the Hong Kong garrison, remaining there for two years until its return to the UK. In 1974, the regiment was re-roled as a mechanised battalion, subsequently being posted to the BAOR for the third time. During this time the Irish Guards had to once again contend with face the difficult reality of trouble on their home island of Ireland and in 1977 the regiment suffered their only fatal casualty of The Troubles, when Guardsman Samuel Murphy was shot by the Provisional IRA while walking with his mother near his parents’ home in Andersonstown in West Belfast whilst on leave. He later died of wounds. Upon returning to the United Kingdom from Germany, however, "The Troubles" reached into central London when an IRA bomb blasted a bus carrying men of the regiment to Chelsea Barracks on 10 October 1981. Twenty-three soldiers and 16 others were wounded and two passers-by killed.

The late 1970s saw the Irish Guards playing supporting roles in several high-profile diplomatic and foreign policy events. In July 1978, they secured the grounds around Leeds Castle for a preliminary meeting between the foreign ministers of the US, Egypt and Israel prior to the historic Camp David Accords. In 1980, they were part of the Commonwealth force dispatched to the former Southern Rhodesia (now Zimbabwe) to supervise that country's first internationally recognized elections as an independent country.

In between, from February to August 1979, they were posted to the Central American country of Belize for the second time. (Their first was in 1973 after their return from Hong Kong.) That country (which gained its independence in 1981), was threatened by Guatemala, which claimed its territory.

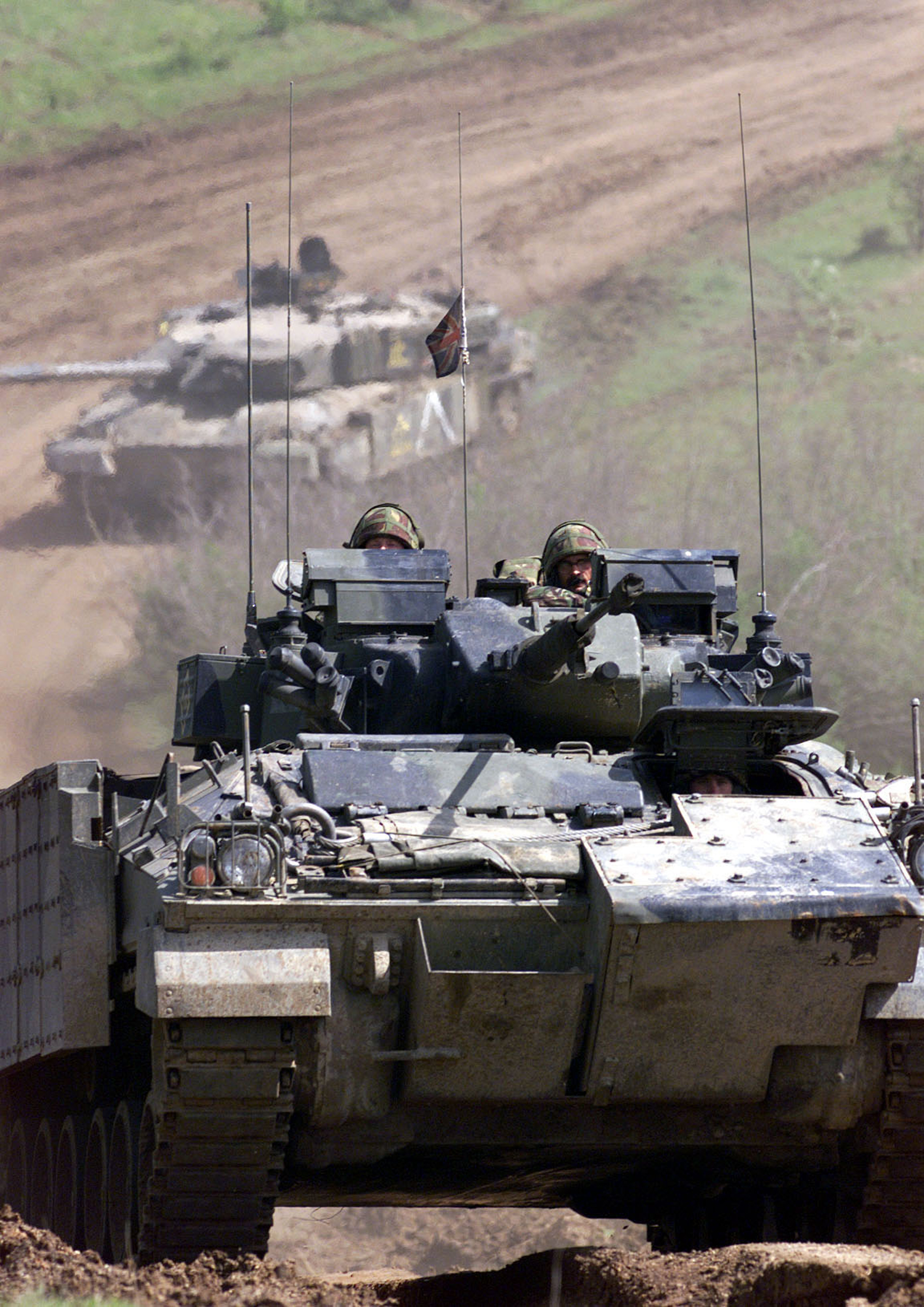
A Warrior Infantry Fighting Vehicle of the Irish Guards training with the Kings Royal Hussars in Macedonia during the Yugoslav Wars, April 1999.

The Irish Guards returned to the BAOR in February 1982, just missing the Falklands War which was instead participated in by the Scots Guards and Welsh Guards. In 1986, the regiment returned home from Germany and received new colours two years later from Queen Elizabeth. They returned to Belize later that year, before being posted to the British sector of West Berlin in 1989, which was their first and only deployment to the city. The regiment were present for the historic moment when the Berlin Wall fell that year, signifying the end of the Cold War in Europe. They Irish Guards left the newly united Berlin in 1992 and returned home to the UK.

=== 1990's: Northern Ireland and the Balkans Conflict ===
The Irish Guards and a number of other British Army regiments including the Gurkhas were long exempted from service in Northern Ireland. (Small numbers of Irish Guardsmen, however, gained experience in Ulster while attached to other Guards regiments during their service in the troubled province). The drawdown in the overall size of the British Army following the end of the Cold War, however, meant that this policy was no longer sustainable and the year 1992 saw the regiment finally carry out its first tour-of-duty in Northern Ireland, being based in County Fermanagh. The violence in Northern Ireland had mostly subsided by this time and their first-ever tour west of the Irish Sea passed quietly. They left the following year. In 1995, the Irish Guards began their second tour of Northern Ireland, being based in County Tyrone. The regiment headed for Germany in 1998 as part of British Forces Germany, successor to BAOR.

The Irish Guards were not in Germany long before the Yugoslav Wars meant they were called on to deal with the troubles in the Balkans in 1999. The regiment formed the Irish Guards Battle Group which was split with a company of the Irish Guards deployed to Macedonia while the rest deployed to Kosovo, where heavy fighting had broken out between Serbian forces and Kosovo Albanian rebel groups. The Irish Guards were the first British unit to enter the Kosovan capital city of Pristina on 12 June and were greeted by the local population who treated the Guards like heroes. After the city had been secured the British troops began to consolidate their position, moving across the surrounding countryside to secure it. The Irish Guards performed professionally, attempting to prevent violence from breaking out between the Albanian and Serb Kosovans while also helping to rebuild the country. The Irish Guards left the Balkans in September 1999, heading back to their base in Germany.

=== 21st Century: The Wars in Iraq and Afghanistan ===
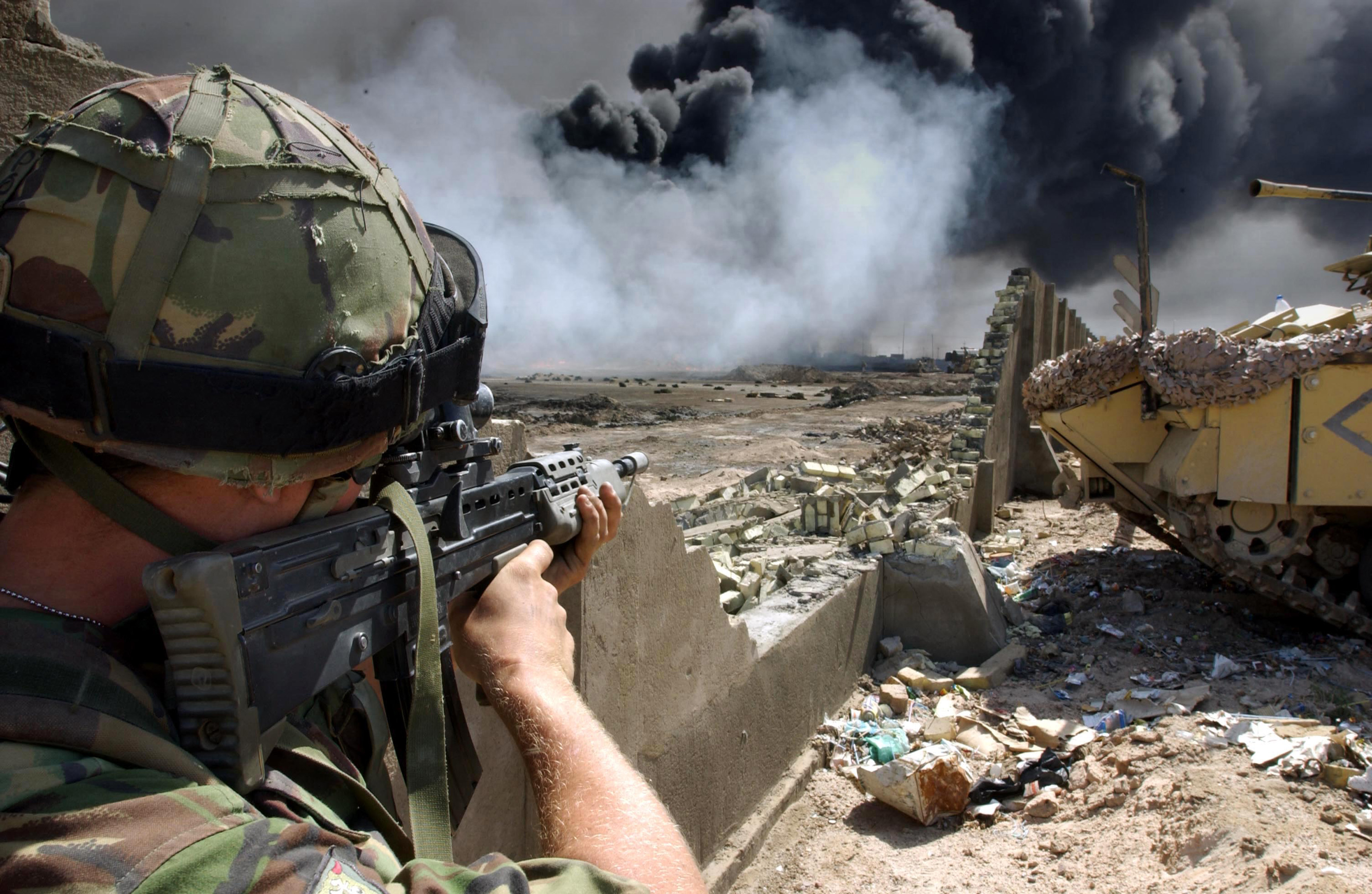
An Irish Guardsman provides cover for Royal Engineers during the Invasion of Iraq.

The beginning of the Irish Guards second century in existence saw the death of Queen Elizabeth The Queen Mother, who had for many decades traditionally presented the Irish Guards with shamrock on St. Patrick's Day, in 2002. At the Queen Mother's funeral the coffin bearer-party was made up of Irish Guardsmen. This was a remarkable honour, given the fact that the late Queen Mother not only was not the regiment's colonel (she was, in fact, colonel-in-chief of the Black Watch), she had no official connection with the regiment at all, in spite of her long identification with it.

In 2003, the Irish Guards were deployed to Kuwait during the build-up to the Iraq War. The Irish Guards formed part of the 7th Armoured Brigade which was the successor of the famed 7th Armoured Division, or 'The Desert Rats', which had fought throughout the deserts of North Africa during the Second World War, and began training to prepare for the war. Similarly to their experience in the Balkans, the Irish Guards were split up with companies, platoons and sections being attached to various units of the Desert Rats. The war began on 21 March when British and American forces began crossing the Iraq border, with the Desert Rats beginning the journey towards Basra, Iraq's second largest city. The British troops spent the next few weeks gradually taking control of much of the area that surrounded Basra with soldiers of the Irish Guards leading the British advance on Basra from late March, helping in securing objectives on the outskirts of the city. After a number of days consolidating their position, the Irish Guards fought their way into the city on 6 April and took a number of casualties in heavy urban warfare before securing the city by the end of the day. The regiment claim to have been the first to enter Basra on 6 April, stating they did so many hours before the Parachute Regiment.

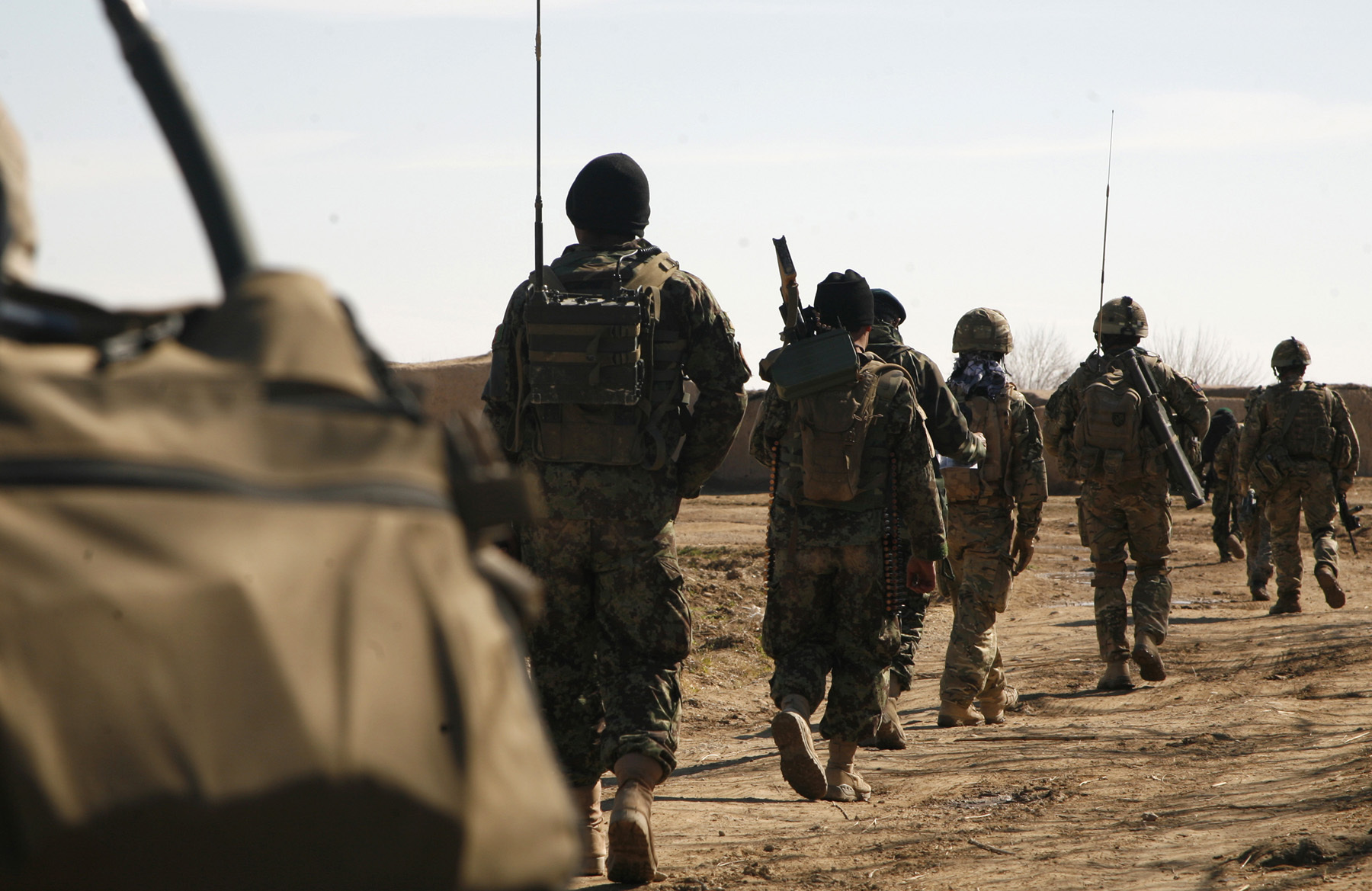
Irish Guardsmen in Helmand Province with members of the Afghan National Army during the War in Afghanistan.

Following the conclusion of the conventional warfare phase in Iraq, the British Army were now faced with a growing insurgency and the Irish Guards reverted from a war-role to performing many duties that would be familiar to any British soldier that has served in Northern Ireland. They performed these duties until early May when they left Iraq and returned home but upon their return to the UK, they were almost immediately posted back to Northern Ireland for a four-month posting for their third tour of the province. In 2005, the 1st Battalion, Irish Guards became the first regiment in the British Army to be officially awarded battle honours for service in Iraq – this was to enable these to be displayed on the battalion's new regimental colour during the Sovereign's Birthday Parade. The Irish Guards returned to Iraq in April 2007 for a six-month tour of the country during which they were based Basra Airport and were responsible for training the Iraqi Army in the face of an intensifying Shia-led insurgency.

Following their return from their second tour of Iraq, the Irish Guards enjoyed a two-year rest period before, in September 2010, they deployed to Afghanistan as part of the British forces in the Afghanistan. While deployed in Helmand Province, the Irish Guards fought the Taliban insurgency and helped to train the Afghan National Army before returning home in April 2011. The regiment returned to Afghanistan in 2013 to complete their second and final tour of Afghanistan. Following the Manchester Arena bombing, 1st Battalion, Irish Guards were deployed in London to guard key locations, including the Ministry of Defence building in Whitehall, as part of Operation Temperer.

Over twelve years after their last deployment to Iraq, the Irish Guards returned to the country in early December 2019 to help train the Iraqi security forces in their fight against ISIS as part of Operation Shader. However, the deployment rapidly changed in January 2020 with the escalation of the 2019–20 Persian Gulf crisis following the American killing of Major General Qasem Soleimani of the Islamic Revolutionary Guard Corps. The Irish Guard's role switched from training to force protection in order to protect British assets in Iraq from possible retaliation by Iran.

== Notes ==
Notes

Citations
