= Handeloh =

- Municipality
- Coat of arms

- Location of Handeloh within Harburg district
- Interactive map of Handeloh
- Location within Germany Location within Lower Saxony
- Coordinates: 53°15′N 9°49′E
- Country: Germany
- State: Lower Saxony
- District: Harburg
- Municipal assoc.: Tostedt
- Subdivisions: 3

Government
  - Mayor: Heinrich Richter

Area
  - Total: 26.91 km^{2} (10.39 sq mi)
- Elevation: 46 m (151 ft)

Population (2025-12-31)
  - Total: 2,440
  - Density: 90.7/km^{2} (235/sq mi)
- Time zone: UTC+01:00 (CET)
  - Summer (DST): UTC+02:00 (CEST)
- Postal codes: 21256
- Dialling codes: 04188
- Vehicle registration: WL
- Website: Gemeinde Handeloh

Handeloh is a municipality located in the district of Harburg, in Lower Saxony, Germany.

== Geography ==
=== Location ===
Handeloh lies between the rivers Seeve and Este, south of Buchholz in der Nordheide. The Harburg Hills lie to the northwest and the Lüneburg Heath Nature Reserve to the southeast. The parish belongs to the collective municipality of Tostedt, whose seat is in the village of Tostedt.

=== Neighbouring communities ===
- Welle
- Otter
- Undeloh
- Buchholz in der Nordheide

=== Sub-divisions ===
Handeloh has the following sub-divisions: Handeloh, Höckel, Inzmühlen and Wörme.

== Politics ==
=== Parish council ===
The parish council, which was elected on 11 September 2011, is made up as follows:

- Freie Wählergemeinschaft Handeloh 4 seats
- CDU 4 seats
- SPD 2 seats
- Bündnis 90/Die Grünen 2 seats
- single candidate 1 seat

(as at: the local elections on 11 September 2011)

=== Coat-of-arms ===
On the left hand side of the shield, in the upper half a gold wagon wheel with 8 spokes on green, in the lower half two blue wavy lines on silver, on the right hand side a black pine with four roots on gold.

Meaning: The wagon wheel symbolises the former importance of forestry in the parish. The two wavy lines represent the rivers Este and Seeve that flow through the parish. The dense woods are portrayed by the pine tree whose four roots symbolise the four villages in the parish association.

== Culture and places of interest ==
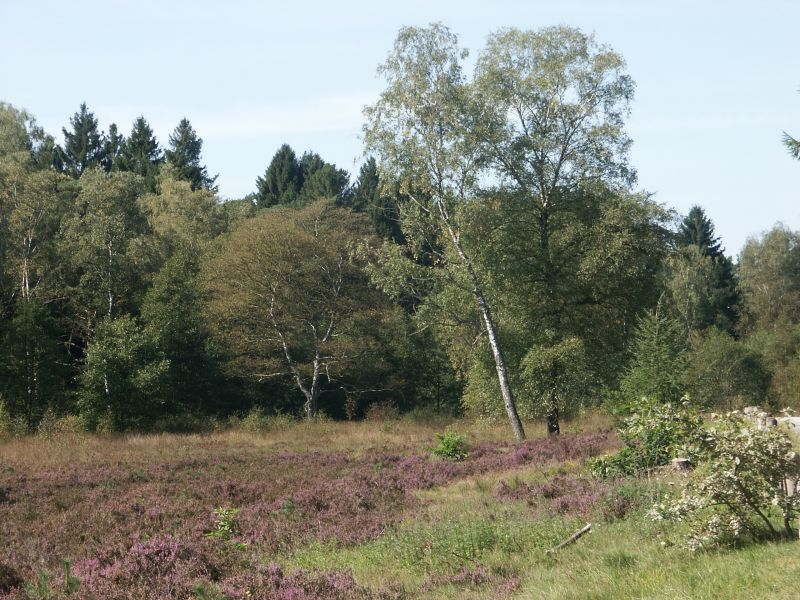
Büsenbach valley

=== Museums ===
- The Alte Schmiede ("Old Smithy") Natural History Museum and Training School

Exhibitions cover the local bird world, mammals and birds of North Germany, including the coasts, local amphibians and reptiles.
The training school hosts seminars for employees in nature conservation management and support.

== Economy and infrastructure ==
=== Transport ===
The village is served by two stations on the Heath Railway (Heidebahn): Handeloh and Büsenbachtal. The latter also serves the village of Wörme and the Büsenbach valley walking area. In addition the station of Handeloh on the Heath Railway is the last stop within the HVV tariff zone. However since 2008 season tickets have been valid to Soltau.

== Media ==
A manor house (Reiterhof) in Handeloh was the main setting for the 52-part TV series Neues vom Süderhof.
