= Tostedt (Samtgemeinde) =

Samtgemeinde Tostedt
- Samtgemeinde
- Location of Samtgemeinde Tostedt within Harburg district
- Interactive map of Samtgemeinde Tostedt
- Location within Germany Location within Lower Saxony
- Coordinates: 53°17′N 09°43′E
- Country: Germany
- State: Lower Saxony
- District: Harburg
- Subdivisions: 9

Government
  - Mayor (2021–26): Peter Dörsam (Ind.)

Area
  - Total: 221.29 km^{2} (85.44 sq mi)

Population (2025-12-31)
  - Total: 27,105
  - Density: 122.49/km^{2} (317.24/sq mi)
- Time zone: UTC+01:00 (CET)
  - Summer (DST): UTC+02:00 (CEST)
- Postal codes: 21255
- Website: www.tostedt.de

Tostedt is a Samtgemeinde ("collective municipality") in the district of Harburg, in Lower Saxony, Germany. Its seat is in the village Tostedt.

== Municipality structure ==
The Samtgemeinde (SG) Tostedt consists of the following municipalities:

1. Dohren
2. Handeloh
3. Heidenau
4. Kakenstorf
5. Königsmoor
6. Otter
7. Tostedt
8. Welle
9. Wistedt

=== Population development ===
The inhabitants of the municipality Tostedt are distributed among the following member communities:

Municipality	Population 2004	Population 2011
SG Tostedt	25,153	25,511
Dohren	939	1084
Handeloh	2453	2423
Heidenau	2064	2126
Kakenstorf	1275	1293
Königsmoor	629	650
Otter	1424	1524
Tostedt (including Todtglüsingen)	13,591	13,569
Welle	1194	1192
Wistedt	1584	1650
