= Dohren =

- Municipality
- Coat of arms

- Location of Dohren within Harburg district
- Interactive map of Dohren
- Location within Germany Location within Lower Saxony
- Coordinates: 53°18′18″N 9°42′9″E
- Country: Germany
- State: Lower Saxony
- District: Harburg
- Municipal assoc.: Tostedt
- Subdivisions: Dohren-Gehege

Government
  - Mayor: Rolf Aldag

Area
  - Total: 12.2 km^{2} (4.7 sq mi)
- Elevation: 54 m (177 ft)

Population (2025-12-31)
  - Total: 1,193
  - Density: 97.8/km^{2} (253/sq mi)
- Time zone: UTC+01:00 (CET)
  - Summer (DST): UTC+02:00 (CEST)
- Postal codes: 21255
- Dialling codes: 04182
- Vehicle registration: WL

Dohren (German pronunciation: [ˈdoːʁən]; Low German: Duhrn) is a municipality in the district of Harburg, in Lower Saxony, Germany.

It belongs to the district (Landkreis) of Harburg (registration plate WL) and is part of the administrative community (Samtgemeinde) of Tostedt.

Dohren is home to a Baseball Bundesliga team, the Dohren Wild Farmers. The team was promoted to the Bundesliga after the 2009 season.
