= Edward Colquhoun Charlton =

Recipient of the Victoria Cross

- Born: 15 June 1920; Rowlands Gill, County Durham, England
- Died: 21 April 1945 (aged 24); Wistedt, Nazi Germany
- Burial place: Becklingen War Cemetery, Germany
- Military career
- Allegiance: United Kingdom
- Branch: British Army
- Service years: 1940–45 †
- Rank: Guardsman
- Units: Irish Guards
- Conflicts: World War II: Western Front; Western Allied invasion of Germany (DOW)
- Awards: Victoria Cross

Edward Colquhoun Charlton VC (15 June 1920 – 21 April 1945) was an English recipient of the Victoria Cross, the highest and most prestigious award for gallantry in the face of the enemy that can be awarded to British and Commonwealth forces.

Charlton was a guardsman in the 2nd Battalion, Irish Guards, Guards Armoured Division, British Army during the Second World War. On 21 April 1945 Guardsman Charlton was a co-driver of one tank of a troop that was supporting an infantry platoon. They occupied the village of Wistedt, Germany, which a unit from Panzergrenadier Regiment 115, part of the 15th Panzergrenadier Division, attempted to re-take. The numerically superior German forces consisted largely of officer cadets under the command of experienced instructor officers, supported by two or three self-propelled guns.

Three of the four Irish Guards tanks were badly hit, while Charlton's had already been disabled by a complete electrical failure before the attack began. Charlton was ordered to dismount the turret 0.30 Browning machine gun and support the infantry. The Irish Guards were in danger of being overrun. Charlton, on his own initiative, took the machine gun and advanced in full view of the attacking Germans, firing from the hip and inflicting heavy casualties. The lead German company was halted, which gave the rest of the Guards a respite in which to reorganise and retire. He continued firing, even when he was wounded in his left arm. Charlton placed the machine gun on a fence, where he launched a further attack, before his left arm was hit again, becoming shattered and useless. Charlton fought on, until a further wound and loss of blood resulted in the guardsman collapsing. His stand enabled the rest of the Irish Guards troop and infantry to escape. He later died of the wounds in enemy hands.

Charlton was awarded a posthumous Victoria Cross, the last Victoria Cross of the European theatre, and the last awarded to a member of the Irish Guards. Unusually, much of the citation was based on German accounts of the fight, as most of his later actions had not been witnessed by any of the Guards officers or surviving non-commissioned officers. His Victoria Cross is displayed at The Guards Regimental Headquarters (Irish Guards RHQ), Wellington Barracks, London, England.

A road is named after Charlton in Firswood, Greater Manchester, near where he lived.
