= Kakenstorf =

- Municipality
- Coat of arms

- Location of Kakenstorf within Harburg district
- Interactive map of Kakenstorf
- Location within Germany Location within Lower Saxony
- Coordinates: 53°19′N 09°46′E
- Country: Germany
- State: Lower Saxony
- District: Harburg
- Municipal assoc.: Tostedt

Government
  - Mayor: Heiko Knüppel

Area
  - Total: 38.71 km^{2} (14.95 sq mi)
- Elevation: 49 m (161 ft)

Population (2025-12-31)
  - Total: 1,499
  - Density: 38.72/km^{2} (100.3/sq mi)
- Time zone: UTC+01:00 (CET)
  - Summer (DST): UTC+02:00 (CEST)
- Postal codes: 21255
- Dialling codes: 04186
- Vehicle registration: WL

Kakenstorf is a municipality in the district of Harburg, in Lower Saxony, Germany.
