= Königsmoor =

- Municipality
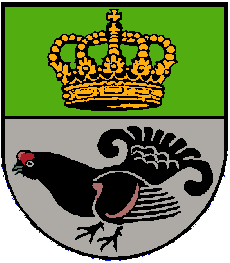
- Coat of arms

- Location of Königsmoor within Harburg district
- Interactive map of Königsmoor
- Location within Germany Location within Lower Saxony
- Coordinates: 53°14′N 09°39′E
- Country: Germany
- State: Lower Saxony
- District: Harburg
- Municipal assoc.: Tostedt

Government
  - Mayor: Hans-Jürgen Dahl

Area
  - Total: 10.01 km^{2} (3.86 sq mi)
- Elevation: 39 m (128 ft)

Population (2025-12-31)
  - Total: 581
  - Density: 58.0/km^{2} (150/sq mi)
- Time zone: UTC+01:00 (CET)
  - Summer (DST): UTC+02:00 (CEST)
- Postal codes: 21255
- Dialling codes: 04180
- Vehicle registration: WL
- Website: www.gemeindekoenigsmoor.de

Königsmoor is a municipality in the district of Harburg, in Lower Saxony, Germany.
