= Heidenau, Lower Saxony =

Heidenau
- Municipality
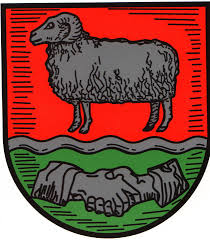
- Coat of arms

- Location of Heidenau within Harburg district
- Interactive map of Heidenau
- Location within Germany Location within Lower Saxony
- Coordinates: 53°19′N 09°40′E
- Country: Germany
- State: Lower Saxony
- District: Harburg
- Municipal assoc.: Tostedt
- Subdivisions: 7

Government
  - Mayor: Anette Randt (CDU)

Area
  - Total: 38.9 km^{2} (15.0 sq mi)
- Elevation: 48 m (157 ft)

Population (2025-12-31)
  - Total: 2,291
  - Density: 58.9/km^{2} (153/sq mi)
- Time zone: UTC+01:00 (CET)
  - Summer (DST): UTC+02:00 (CEST)
- Postal codes: 21258
- Dialling codes: 04182
- Vehicle registration: WL

Heidenau (German pronunciation: [ˈhaɪdənaʊ]) is a municipality in the district of Harburg, in Lower Saxony, Germany.
