= Otter, Germany =

Otter
- Municipality
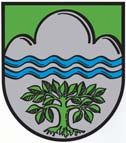
- Coat of arms

- Location of Otter within Harburg district
- Interactive map of Otter
- Location within Germany Location within Lower Saxony
- Coordinates: 53°14′26″N 9°44′32″E
- Country: Germany
- State: Lower Saxony
- District: Harburg
- Municipal assoc.: Tostedt

Government
  - Mayor: Herbert Busch (CDU)

Area
  - Total: 34.13 km^{2} (13.18 sq mi)
- Elevation: 47 m (154 ft)

Population (2025-12-31)
  - Total: 1,660
  - Density: 48.6/km^{2} (126/sq mi)
- Time zone: UTC+01:00 (CET)
  - Summer (DST): UTC+02:00 (CEST)
- Postal codes: 21259
- Dialling codes: 04182
- Vehicle registration: WL
- Website: www.otter.de

Otter is a municipality in the district of Harburg, in Lower Saxony, Germany.
