= Wistedt =

- Municipality
- Coat of arms

- Location of Wistedt within Harburg district
- Interactive map of Wistedt
- Location within Germany Location within Lower Saxony
- Coordinates: 53°16′N 09°41′E
- Country: Germany
- State: Lower Saxony
- District: Harburg
- Municipal assoc.: Tostedt
- Subdivisions: 1

Government
  - Mayor: Wolfgang Indorf (CDU)

Area
  - Total: 18.49 km^{2} (7.14 sq mi)
- Elevation: 45 m (148 ft)

Population (2025-12-31)
  - Total: 1,803
  - Density: 97.51/km^{2} (252.6/sq mi)
- Time zone: UTC+01:00 (CET)
  - Summer (DST): UTC+02:00 (CEST)
- Postal codes: 21255
- Dialling codes: 04182
- Vehicle registration: WL
- Website: www.wistedt.de

Wistedt is a municipality in the district of Harburg, in Lower Saxony, Germany.
