= Lüchow-Dannenberg – Lüneburg =

Federal electoral district of Germany

37 Lüchow-Dannenberg – Lüneburg
- Electoral district for the Bundestag
- Lüchow-Dannenberg – Lüneburg in 2025
- State: Lower Saxony
- Population: 232,600 (2019)
- Electorate: 182,673 (2017)
- Major settlements: Lüneburg
- Area: 2,555.1 km^{2}

Current electoral district
- Created: 1949
- Party: SPD
- Member: Jakob Blankenburg
- Elected: 2021, 2025

Lüchow-Dannenberg – Lüneburg is an electoral constituency (German: Wahlkreis) represented in the Bundestag. It elects one member via first-past-the-post voting. Under the current constituency numbering system, it is designated as constituency 37. It is located in northeastern Lower Saxony, comprising the Lüchow-Dannenberg and Lüneburg districts.

Lüchow-Dannenberg – Lüneburg was created for the inaugural 1949 federal election. Since 2021, it has been represented by Jakob Blankenburg of the Social Democratic Party (SPD).

== Geography ==
Lüchow-Dannenberg – Lüneburg is located in northeastern Lower Saxony. As of the 2021 federal election, it comprises the entirety of the districts of Lüchow-Dannenberg and Lüneburg.

== History ==
Lüchow-Dannenberg – Lüneburg was created in 1949, then known as Lüneburg – Dannenberg. In the 1965 through 1998 elections, it was named Lüneburg – Lüchow-Dannenberg. It acquired its current name in the 2002 election. In the inaugural Bundestag election, it was Lower Saxony constituency 13 in the numbering system. From 1953 through 1961, it was number 35. From 1965 through 1998, it was number 31. In the 2002 and 2005 elections, it was number 37. In the 2009 election, it was number 38. Since the 2013 election, it has been number 37.

Originally, the constituency comprised the independent city of Lüneburg and the districts of Landkreis Lüneburg and Lüchow-Dannenberg. In the 1953 election, it gained the Uelzen district with the exception of the city of Uelzen and the Samtgemeinden of Altes Amt Ebstorf and Suderburg. In the 1980 through 1998 elections, it comprised only the Lüchow-Dannenberg and Lüneburg districts. In the 2002 and 2005 elections, it also contained the Samtgemeinden of Elbmarsch, Hanstedt, and Salzhausen from Harburg district and the municipality of Munster from Soltau-Fallingbostel district. Since the 2009 election, it has comprised only the Lüchow-Dannenberg and Lüneburg districts.

Election	No.	Name	Borders
1949	13	Lüneburg – Dannenberg	Lüneburg city; Landkreis Lüneburg district; Lüchow-Dannenberg district
1953	35	Lüneburg – Dannenberg	Lüneburg city; Landkreis Lüneburg district; Lüchow-Dannenberg district
1957	35	Lüneburg – Dannenberg	Lüneburg city; Landkreis Lüneburg district; Lüchow-Dannenberg district
1961	35	Lüneburg – Dannenberg	Lüneburg city; Landkreis Lüneburg district; Lüchow-Dannenberg district
1965	31	Lüneburg – Lüchow-Dannenberg	Lüneburg city; Landkreis Lüneburg district; Lüchow-Dannenberg district; Uelzen district (only Uelzen municipality and Altes Amt Ebstorf and Suderburg Samtgemeinden)
1969	31	Lüneburg – Lüchow-Dannenberg	Lüneburg city; Landkreis Lüneburg district; Lüchow-Dannenberg district; Uelzen district (only Uelzen municipality and Altes Amt Ebstorf and Suderburg Samtgemeinden)
1972	31	Lüneburg – Lüchow-Dannenberg	Lüneburg city; Landkreis Lüneburg district; Lüchow-Dannenberg district; Uelzen district (only Uelzen municipality and Altes Amt Ebstorf and Suderburg Samtgemeinden)
1976	31	Lüneburg – Lüchow-Dannenberg	Lüneburg city; Landkreis Lüneburg district; Lüchow-Dannenberg district; Uelzen district (only Uelzen municipality and Altes Amt Ebstorf and Suderburg Samtgemeinden)
1980	31	Lüneburg – Lüchow-Dannenberg	Lüneburg district; Lüchow-Dannenberg district
1983	31	Lüneburg – Lüchow-Dannenberg	Lüneburg district; Lüchow-Dannenberg district
1987	31	Lüneburg – Lüchow-Dannenberg	Lüneburg district; Lüchow-Dannenberg district
1990	31	Lüneburg – Lüchow-Dannenberg	Lüneburg district; Lüchow-Dannenberg district
1994	31	Lüneburg – Lüchow-Dannenberg	Lüneburg district; Lüchow-Dannenberg district
1998	31	Lüneburg – Lüchow-Dannenberg	Lüneburg district; Lüchow-Dannenberg district
2002	37	Lüchow-Dannenberg – Lüneburg	Lüneburg district; Lüchow-Dannenberg district; Harburg district (only Elbmarsch, Hanstedt, and Salzhausen Samtgemeinden); Soltau-Fallingbostel district (only Munster municipality)
2005	37	Lüchow-Dannenberg – Lüneburg	Lüneburg district; Lüchow-Dannenberg district; Harburg district (only Elbmarsch, Hanstedt, and Salzhausen Samtgemeinden); Soltau-Fallingbostel district (only Munster municipality)
2009	38	Lüchow-Dannenberg – Lüneburg	Lüneburg district; Lüchow-Dannenberg district
2013	37	Lüchow-Dannenberg – Lüneburg	Lüneburg district; Lüchow-Dannenberg district
2017	37	Lüchow-Dannenberg – Lüneburg	Lüneburg district; Lüchow-Dannenberg district
2021	37	Lüchow-Dannenberg – Lüneburg	Lüneburg district; Lüchow-Dannenberg district
2025	37	Lüchow-Dannenberg – Lüneburg	Lüneburg district; Lüchow-Dannenberg district

== Members ==
The constituency was first held by Friedrich Nowack of the Social Democratic Party (SPD), who served from 1949 until 1953. He was succeeded by Willi Koops of the Christian Democratic Union (CDU), who served a single term. He was succeeded by fellow CDU member Lambert Huys. In 1972, Horst Schröder of the CDU was elected representative. Klaus Harries served from 1987 to 1994, then Kurt-Dieter Grill from 1994 to 1998. The SPD won the constituency in 1998, and Arne Fuhrmann served a single term as representative. Hedi Wegener then served from 2002 to 2005. In 2009, Eckhard Pols of the CDU won the constituency. He was re-elected in 2013 and 2017. Jakob Blankenburg won the constituency for the SPD in 2021.

Election	Member	Party	%
1949	Friedrich Nowack	SPD	31.7
1953	Willi Koops	CDU	25.5
1957	Lambert Huys	CDU	36.4
1961	Lambert Huys	CDU	36.0
1965	Lambert Huys	CDU	51.5
1969	Lambert Huys	CDU	49.7
1972	Horst Schröder	CDU	47.4
1976	Horst Schröder	CDU	51.2
1980	Horst Schröder	CDU	43.9
1983	Horst Schröder	CDU	49.0
1987	Klaus Harries	CDU	46.1
1990	Klaus Harries	CDU	46.5
1994	Kurt-Dieter Grill	CDU	44.6
1998	Arne Fuhrmann	SPD	49.4
2002	Hedi Wegener	SPD	46.8
2005	Hedi Wegener	SPD	43.8
2009	Eckhard Pols	CDU	33.3
2013	Eckhard Pols	CDU	39.8
2017	Eckhard Pols	CDU	33.5
2021	Jakob Blankenburg	SPD	28.2
2025	Jakob Blankenburg	SPD	27.8

== Election results ==
=== 2025 election ===
Federal election (2025): Lüchow-Dannenberg – Lüneburg
Notes:	Blue background denotes the winner of the electorate vote. Pink background denotes a candidate elected from their party list. Yellow background denotes an electorate win by a list member, or other incumbent. A ✓ or ✗ denotes status of any incumbent, win or lose respectively.						
Party	Candidate	Votes	%	±%	Party votes	%	±%
SPD	✓ Jakob Blankenburg	42,817	27.8	▼0.4	32,399	21.0	▼8.9
CDU	Marco Schulze	40,541	26.3	▲1.4	37,097	24.1	▲3.0
Greens	Julia Verlinden	25,243	16.4	▼8.7	25,602	16.6	▼5.5
AfD	Michael Teixeira Gonçalves	23,895	15.5	▲9.3	25,017	16.2	▲9.6
Left	Marianne Esders	10,925	7.1	▲3.2	15,934	10.3	▲5.8
BSW					5,962	3.9	
FDP	Cornelius Grimm	3,894	2.5	▼4.4	5,627	3.7	▼5.9
FW	Henning Harms	3,710	2.4	▲1.3	1,880	1.2	▲0.4
Tierschutzpartei					1,766	1.1	▼0.1
dieBasis	Dietrich Münster	1,524	1.0	▼0.9	565	0.4	▼1.4
Volt	Nico Abraham	1,338	0.9		977	0.6	▲0.4
PARTEI					802	0.5	▼0.6
Pirates					258	0.2	▼0.2
BD					146	0.1	
Humanists					88	0.1	0.0
MLPD					35	0.0	0.0
Informal votes		944			676		
Total valid votes		153,887			154,155		
Turnout		154,831	84.8	▲6.6			
SPD hold	Majority	2,276	1.5	▼1.6			

=== 2021 election ===
Federal election (2021): Lüchow-Dannenberg – Lüneburg
Notes:	Blue background denotes the winner of the electorate vote. Pink background denotes a candidate elected from their party list. Yellow background denotes an electorate win by a list member, or other incumbent. A ✓ or ✗ denotes status of any incumbent, win or lose respectively.						
Party	Candidate	Votes	%	±%	Party votes	%	±%
SPD	Jakob Blankenburg	38,784	28.2	▲0.1	41,262	29.9	▲6.4
Greens	Julia Verlinden	34,606	25.1	▲10.4	30,585	22.1	▲8.7
CDU	✗ Eckhard Pols	34,287	24.9	▼8.6	29,032	21.0	▼10.3
FDP	Edzard Schmidt-Jortzig	9,513	6.9	▲0.3	13,241	9.6	▲0.3
AfD	Armin-Paulus Hampel	8,603	6.3	▼2.4	9,145	6.6	▼2.3
Left	Thorben Peters	5,378	3.9	▼4.5	6,328	4.6	▼4.5
dieBasis	Sören Köppen	2,542	1.8		2,399	1.7	
Tierschutzpartei					1,681	1.2	▲0.1
PARTEI	Meike Hilbeck	2,187	1.6		1,489	1.1	▲0.1
FW	Volker Heinecke	1,561	1.1		1,161	0.8	▲0.4
Pirates					453	0.3	0.0
Volt					368	0.3	
Team Todenhöfer					189	0.1	
NPD					179	0.1	▼0.2
ÖDP					147	0.1	▼0.1
Humanists					119	0.1	
du.					94	0.1	
V-Partei3					91	0.1	▼0.1
DKP					65	0.1	0.0
LKR	Fronke Gerken	105	0.1		53	0.0	
Independent	Tristan Großkopf	71	0.1				
MLPD					25	0.0	0.0
Informal votes		1,546			1,077		
Total valid votes		137,637			138,106		
Turnout		139,183	76.2	▼1.8			
SPD gain from CDU	Majority	4,178	3.1				

=== 2017 election ===
Federal election (2017): Lüchow-Dannenberg – Lüneburg
Notes:	Blue background denotes the winner of the electorate vote. Pink background denotes a candidate elected from their party list. Yellow background denotes an electorate win by a list member, or other incumbent. A ✓ or ✗ denotes status of any incumbent, win or lose respectively.						
Party	Candidate	Votes	%	±%	Party votes	%	±%
CDU	✓ Eckhard Pols	46,740	33.5	▼6.3	43,861	31.3	▼5.5
SPD	Hiltrud Lotze	39,169	28.1	▼5.6	32,865	23.5	▼5.6
Greens	Julia Verlinden	20,604	14.8	▲2.7	18,906	13.5	▼0.8
AfD	Gunter Runkel	12,131	8.7	▲5.0	12,498	8.9	▲4.5
Left	Michèl Pauly	11,729	8.4	▲2.5	12,705	9.1	▲2.1
FDP	Edzard Schmidt-Jortzig	9,245	6.6	▲5.0	12,959	9.2	▲5.3
Tierschutzpartei					1,506	1.1	▲0.3
PARTEI					1,387	1.0	
BGE					881	0.6	
FW					552	0.4	
Pirates					486	0.3	▼1.9
NPD					395	0.3	▼0.6
DiB					312	0.2	
DM					263	0.2	
ÖDP					250	0.2	
V-Partei³					241	0.2	
DKP					36	0.0	
MLPD					36	0.0	0.0
Informal votes		1,382			861		
Total valid votes		139,618			140,139		
Turnout		141,000	78.0	▲3.4			
CDU hold	Majority	7,571	5.4	▼0.7			

=== 2013 election ===
Federal election (2013): Lüchow-Dannenberg – Lüneburg
Notes:	Blue background denotes the winner of the electorate vote. Pink background denotes a candidate elected from their party list. Yellow background denotes an electorate win by a list member, or other incumbent. A ✓ or ✗ denotes status of any incumbent, win or lose respectively.						
Party	Candidate	Votes	%	±%	Party votes	%	±%
CDU	✓ Eckhard Pols	52,644	39.8	▲6.5	48,756	36.8	▲8.2
SPD	Hiltrud Lotze	44,491	33.7	▲2.5	38,415	29.0	▲4.2
Greens	Julia Verlinden	15,918	12.0	▼3.1	18,892	14.3	▼3.8
Left	Johanna Voß	7,784	5.9	▼3.3	9,202	6.9	▼3.2
AfD	Michael Recha	4,925	3.7		5,852	4.4	
Pirates	Olaf Forberger	2,879	2.2		3,000	2.3	▲0.1
FDP	Tobias Debuch	2,112	1.6	▼7.1	5,281	4.0	▼8.6
NPD	Manfred Börm	1,240	0.9	▼0.5	1,145	0.9	▼0.4
Tierschutzpartei					1,081	0.8	0.0
FW					402	0.3	
PBC	Sonni Tonne	206	0.2		177	0.1	
PRO					136	0.1	
REP					47	0.0	
MLPD					30	0.0	0.0
Informal votes		1,375			1,158		
Total valid votes		132,199			132,416		
Turnout		133,574	74.6	▲0.4			
CDU hold	Majority	8,153	6.1	▲3.9			

=== 2009 election ===
Federal election (2009): Lüchow-Dannenberg – Lüneburg
Notes:	Blue background denotes the winner of the electorate vote. Pink background denotes a candidate elected from their party list. Yellow background denotes an electorate win by a list member, or other incumbent. A ✓ or ✗ denotes status of any incumbent, win or lose respectively.						
Party	Candidate	Votes	%	±%	Party votes	%	±%
CDU	Eckhard Pols	43,229	33.3	▼2.7	37,291	28.7	▼2.1
SPD	Hiltrud Lotze	40,411	31.1	▼13.7	32,321	24.8	▼14.5
Greens	Andreas Meihsies	19,645	15.1	▲6.7	23,543	18.1	▲6.1
Left	Johanna Voß	11,935	9.2	▲4.0	13,166	10.1	▲4.1
FDP	Boris Freiherr von der Bussche	11,242	8.7	▲4.6	16,323	12.5	▲3.3
Pirates					2,795	2.0	
NPD	Christian Berisha	1,860	1.4	0.0	1,594	1.2	▼0.1
Tierschutzpartei					1,002	0.8	▲0.2
RRP	Horst Gilles	1,449	1.1		1,703	1.3	
ÖDP					194	0.1	
DVU					135	0.1	
MLPD					32	0.0	0.0
Informal votes		1,695			1,366		
Total valid votes		129,771			130,100		
Turnout		131,466	74.2	▼5.0			
CDU gain from SPD	Majority	2,818	2.2				

=== 2005 election ===
Federal election (2005):Lüchow-Dannenberg – Lüneburg
Notes:	Blue background denotes the winner of the electorate vote. Pink background denotes a candidate elected from their party list. Yellow background denotes an electorate win by a list member, or other incumbent. A ✓ or ✗ denotes status of any incumbent, win or lose respectively.						
Party	Candidate	Votes	%	±%	Party votes	%	±%
SPD	✓ Hedi Wegener	75,927	43.8	▼2.9	67,091	38.6	▼4.9
CDU	Kurt-Dieter Grill	66,388	38.3	▲1.4	56,575	32.6	▼1.2
Greens	Marianne Tritz	13,172	7.6	▲0.5	18,985	10.9	▲0.2
Left	Kurt Herzog	8,209	4.7	▲3.4	9,519	5.5	▲3.9
FDP	Dennis Domanski	7,162	4.1	▼0.8	16,812	9.7	▲2.0
NPD	Hans-Joachim Bäätjer	2,468	1.4	▲0.9	2,312	1.3	▲1.0
Tierschutzpartei					1,054	0.6	▲0.2
GRAUEN					714	0.4	▲0.3
PBC					339	0.2	0.0
Pro German Center – Pro D-Mark Initiative					148	0.1	
MLPD					81	0.0	Steady
BüSo					67	0.0	
Informal votes		2,393			2,022		
Total valid votes		173,326			173,697		
Turnout		175,719	79.5	▼1.3			
SPD hold	Majority	9,539	5.5				
