= Undeloh =

- Municipality
- Coat of arms

- Location of Undeloh within Harburg district
- Interactive map of Undeloh
- Location within Germany Location within Lower Saxony
- Coordinates: 53°11′46″N 9°59′00″E
- Country: Germany
- State: Lower Saxony
- District: Harburg
- Municipal assoc.: Hanstedt

Area
  - Total: 48.2 km^{2} (18.6 sq mi)
- Elevation: 85 m (279 ft)

Population (2025-12-31)
  - Total: 1,015
  - Density: 21.1/km^{2} (54.5/sq mi)
- Time zone: UTC+01:00 (CET)
  - Summer (DST): UTC+02:00 (CEST)
- Postal codes: 21274
- Dialling codes: 04189
- Vehicle registration: WL

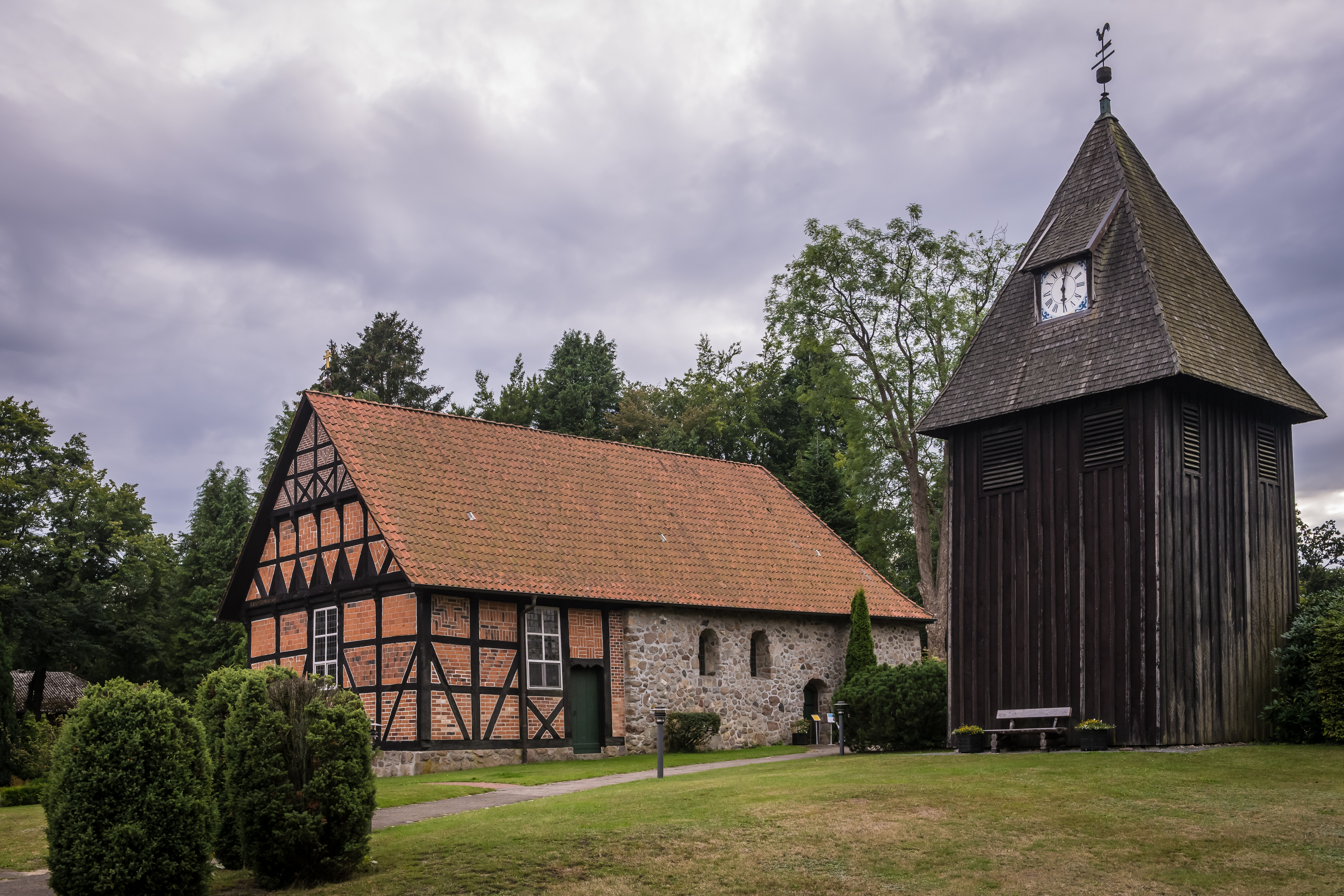
St. Magdalene's Heath Church

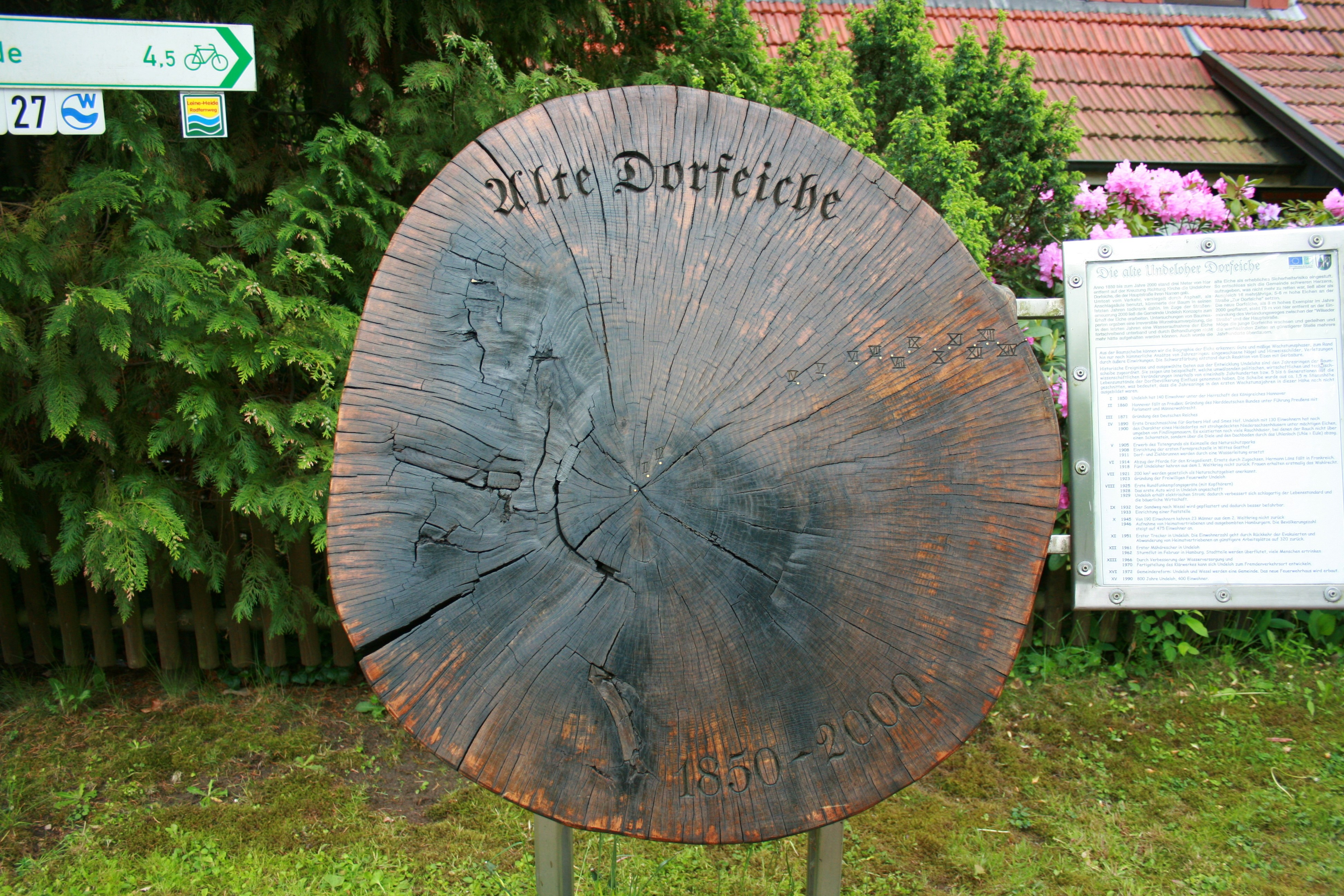
The old village oak in the heart of the village

Undeloh (Low German: Unnel) is a village in the district of Harburg, in Lower Saxony, Germany.

== Geography ==
=== Location ===
Undeloh lies on the Lüneburg Heath near its highest hill, the Wilseder Berg.

=== Neighbouring communities ===
- Jesteburg, Hanstedt, Egestorf und Bispingen

=== Municipal divisions ===
The municipality or parish of Undeloh consists of 6 villages: Undeloh, Wehlen, Wesel, Meningen, Thonhof and Heimbuch.

== Coat-of-arms ==
A red clock tower with a green roof on a green base; in the left-hand black field a gold set of stag's antlers with a silver skull.

== Economy and infrastructure ==
Undeloh is a popular destination on the heath, especially for the Hamburg region.

=== Transport ===
- Car:

The nearest motorway exit is Egestorf on the A7.

- Railway:

The nearest railway station is at Handeloh (11 km), but there is a better train service at Buchholz (22 km).

- Bus:

Undeloh linked by KVG regional bus lines number 4207 (to Hanstedt/Hamburg-Harburg) and 5200 (to Salzhausen/Lüneburg). These lines belong to the Hamburg Transport Association (Hamburger Verkehrsverbund or HVV).

In addition public schoolbuses run to schools at Egestorf, Hanstedt and Buchholz (lines 4611 and 4631).

== Origins and history ==
The name Undeloh means something like "grove by the head of a stream" (Quellhain). A small pond, the so-called Hungerteich (aka the Hungerpohl), presumably supplied a lot of water in times of drought and could be used to water the fields and cattle. In addition tradesmen came from around the region in order to see whether it would be a dry or wet year.
