= Drage, Lower Saxony =

Drage
- Municipality
- Coat of arms

- Location of Drage within Harburg district
- Interactive map of Drage
- Location within Germany Location within Lower Saxony
- Coordinates: 53°25′N 10°16′E
- Country: Germany
- State: Lower Saxony
- District: Harburg
- Municipal assoc.: Elbmarsch
- Subdivisions: 9

Government
  - Mayor: Uwe Harden (SPD)

Area
  - Total: 30.35 km^{2} (11.72 sq mi)
- Elevation: 4 m (13 ft)

Population (2025-12-31)
  - Total: 4,327
  - Density: 142.6/km^{2} (369.3/sq mi)
- Time zone: UTC+01:00 (CET)
  - Summer (DST): UTC+02:00 (CEST)
- Postal codes: 21423
- Dialling codes: 04177
- Vehicle registration: WL

Drage (German pronunciation: [ˈdʁaːɡə]) is a municipality in the district of Harburg, in Lower Saxony, Germany. With Marschacht and Tespe it completes the Samtgemeinde Elbmarsch. Drage is close beside Winsen (Luhe), the center of the county Harburg.
