= Tangendorf disc brooch =

Iron Age brooch found near Tangendorf, Germany

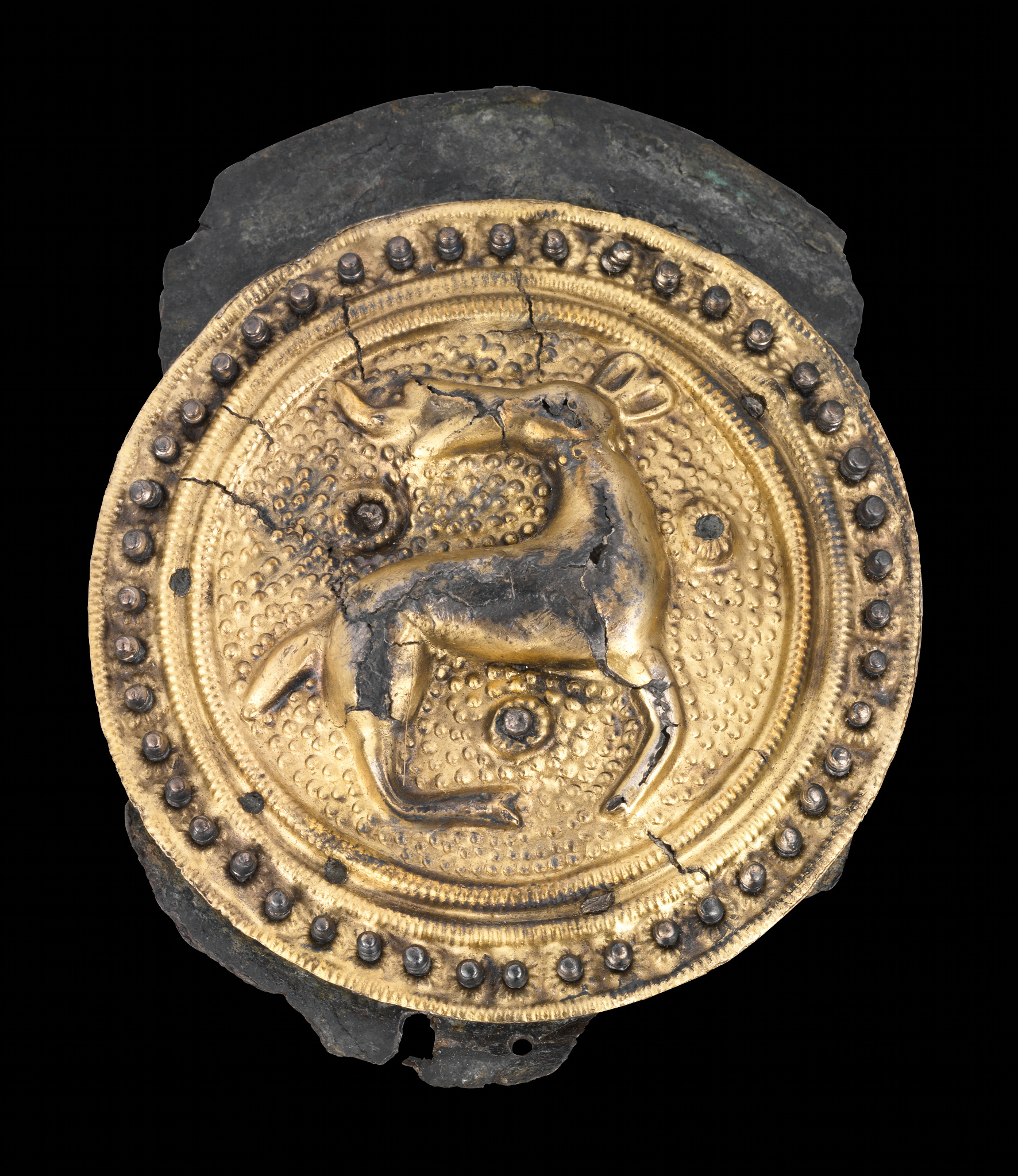
- Year: 3rd century AD
- Type: Brooch
- Medium: Fire gilded silver
- Subject: Animal
- Dimensions: 58 mm diameter (2.3 in)
- Location: Archäologisches Museum Hamburg; Harburg, Hamburg
- Owner: Archäologisches Museum Hamburg

The Tangendorf disc brooch (German: Scheibenfibel von Tangendorf) is an Iron Age fibula from the 3rd century AD, which was dug up in 1930 from the sand of a Bronze Age tumulus near Tangendorf, Toppenstedt, Harburg, Lower Saxony, Germany. The front of the elaborately crafted garment fibula is decorated with a rear-facing four-legged animal, probably a dog or a deer. It is one of Harburg's most important finds from the period of the Roman Empire, and is in the permanent exhibition of the Archaeological Museum Hamburg in Harburg, Hamburg. An image of this fibula is part of the logo of this museum.

== Discovery ==
The Tangendorf disc brooch was found in 1930 in a tumulus (at 53.30202°N 10.076256°E) on a parcel of land known as Im schwarzen Dorn (in the black dorn), on the outer northwest corner of Tangendorf. While digging off sand from a Bronze Age grave mound in his field, farmer Heinrich Wille found the fibula together with a bronze hair clip (German: Haarknotenfibel) and a bronze spear blade. The hair clip and the spear blade were passed to the Helms-Museum; however, the brooch was left with a teacher at the Tangendorf elementary school.

In the summer of 1938 the teacher asked Helms-Museum's director Willi Wegewitz to pick up a Neolithic stone axe. While handing over the stone axe the brooch was rediscovered in a drawer, among the school's exercise equipment. The teacher was considering disposing of the brooch because he thought it was simply a worthless modern object without any archaeological significance. Wegewitz immediately arranged an excavation of the tumulus. The mound's original diameter of 16 metres (52 ft) was still clearly visible on the ploughed field and further remnants of a hair clip were discovered. The farmer revealed that he had found the brooch on the edge of the grave mound in the amount of increased soil in sand; he had not noticed that Erdverfärbungen (earth discolorations), might indicate a cremation burial.

== Findings ==
The fibula is a multilayered structure. Its face consists of a very thin fire gilded and contoured silver disc, having a diameter of 58 millimetres (2.3 in). This is fixed by three silver rivet pins to an identically sized, 3 millimetres (0.12 in) thick copper plate and together with this on a stronger silver plate. The rear plate, 78 millimetres (3.1 in) in diameter, is significantly larger. On its rear, the pin was mounted. The reverse of the front plate was filled with a now whitish green mix of tin, lead and traces of copper in order to support the sensitive friction work and to prevent the pressing of the driven ornaments. But the tin components of the filler have damaged some of the metal parts of the decoration due to allotropic processes forced by low temperatures during long term storage in the soil (tin pest). The decoration consists of a quadrupedal animal walking to the right, with the animal's head facing backwards. It has two ears and a protruding tongue. Around its neck it wears a collar shaped ornament. The legs are positioned under the body to accommodate the round shape of the disc. The background is decorated with irregularly distributed impressions, imitating a granulation. The scene is framed by two ribbed bands, which are enclosed by an ornamental wreath and another ribbed band. Around the body of the animal there are three rosette shaped rivet heads. The body of the animal has a large defect caused by the degenerated tin filling. Some of the protruding edges of the rear mounting plate are broken away. Beneath the copper plate, residual amounts of organic material were found, which were interpreted as ivory. Due to typological comparisons of the ornaments, the fibula was dated to circa 300 AD.

== Interpretation ==
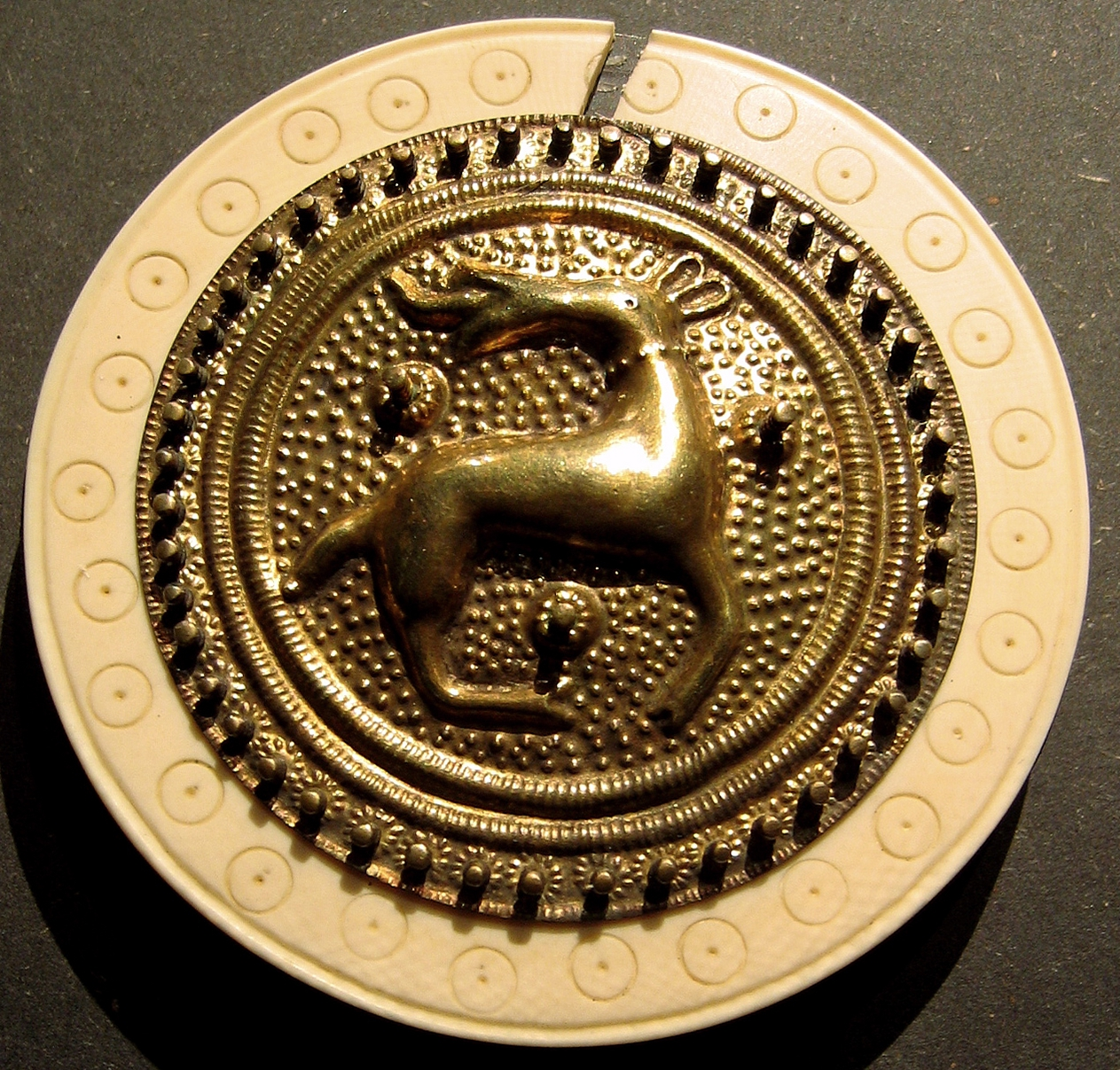
Reconstruction by Hans Drescher (with broken ivory ring)

Due to the improper recovery without accurate documentation of the find, accurate statements can not be given about the archaeological context the disc brooch to the Iron Age burial and the Bronze Age secondary burial. It is also not known how many additional grave goods were lost. Compared to similar finds, all of these burials should have usually contained other jewellery and utensils. Based on the statements of farmer Wille, the Iron Age grave with the disc brooch was suspected to be a cremation burial, on top of a pre-existing burial mound, a suspicion which is supported from many other Iron Age grave findings. The brooch is a high-quality, most likely Germanic, goldsmiths' work, inspired by Roman models. The animal depicted is interpreted as a dog or an antler-less deer. The reason for the depiction of a rear-facing animal may be found in Germanic art conventions or it may based on mythological ideas, but it can also be attributed to the fact that it allows a larger depiction of the animal within the available space. The protruding edge of the rear silver disc and the remains of organic material beneath the copper disk suggests that the front plates of the fibula was surrounded by an ornate ring of ivory of about 10 millimetres (0.39 in) width.

=== Comparable artwork ===
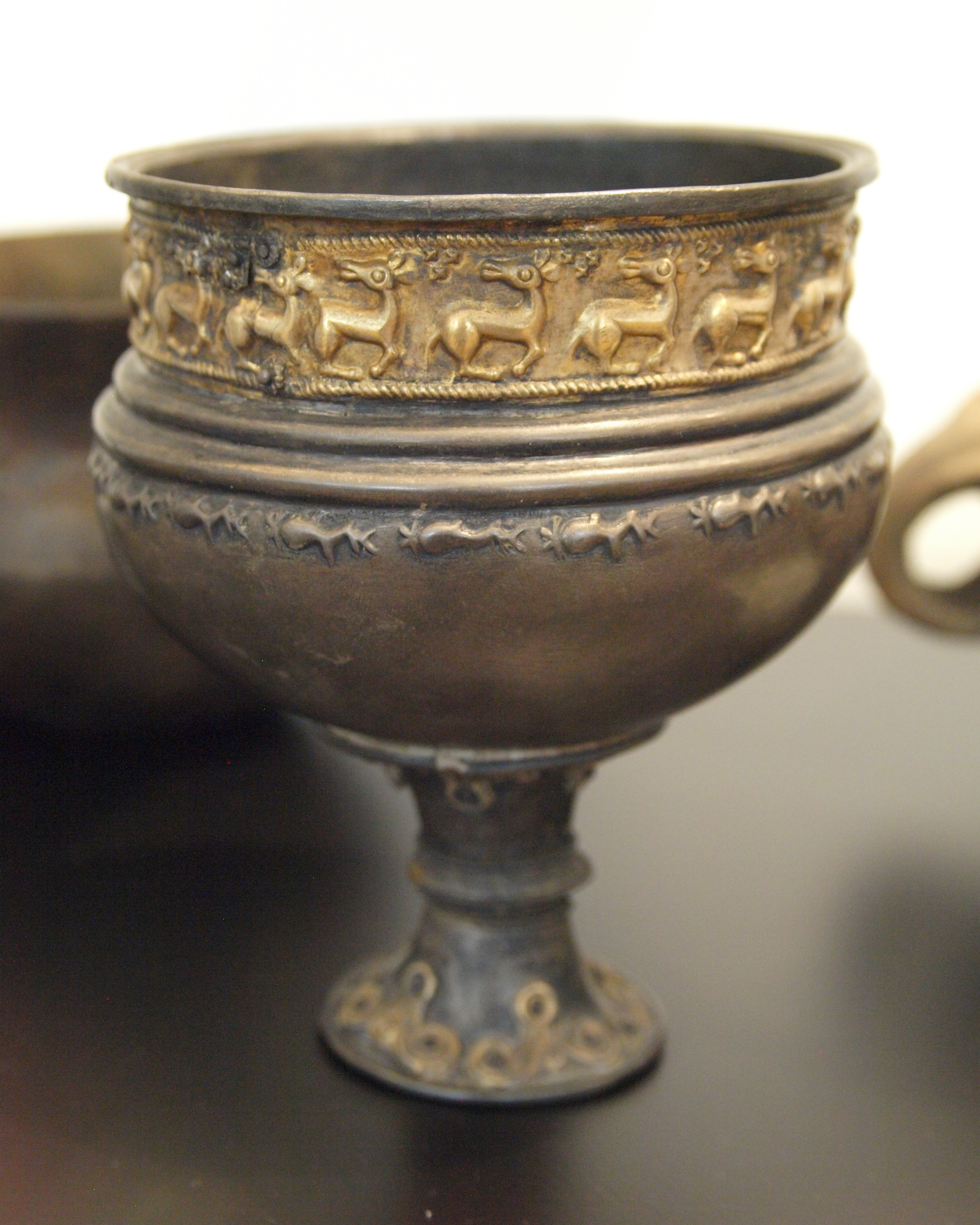
Partly reconstructed Nordrup Silver Goblet showing similar rear-facing animals at National Museum of Denmark

A similar, 55 millimetres (2.2 in) diameter, disc brooch is known from a burial at Häven in Mecklenburg-Vorpommern, Germany, but depicts a forward-facing animal. The similarities in manufacture and decoration are so striking that Wegewitz believed they were produced in the same workshop. Parallels of the illustrated animal are known from archaeological finds on a silver goblet from Nordrup (near Skaftelev in Slagelse Municipality, Zealand (Denmark), a belt decoration plate from Skedemosse (Sweden), a drawing on a Quadi vessel shard of the 2nd century from Prikas, Olomouc, Moravia (Czech Republic), and on the gold bracteate of Ponsdorf Mistelbach District, Lower Austria. According to Willi Wegewitz the Tangendorf disc brooch is one of the most magnificent brooches of the period of the Roman Empire from northern Germany and Scandinavia.

=== Reconstruction ===
After a detailed analysis of the construction, Hans Drescher manufactured two reconstructions of the Tangendorf disc brooch, one copy for the Helms-Museum and the second for the Niedersächsisches Landesmuseum Hannover. Drescher used ivory for the organic ring, giving a decorative contrast between its white color and the golden disc. Drescher published his detailed findings in 1955.

== Reception ==
Coat of arms of Toppenstedt

Since 2002, Toppenstedt has used a stylised representation of the brooch in its coat of arms.

== Bibliography ==
- Wegewitz, Willi (1988). "Die Scheibenfibel von Tangendorf". Hammaburg N.F. (in German). 8: 148–150. ISSN 0173-0886.
- Drescher, Hans (1955). "Die Nachbildung der Scheibenfibel aus Tangendorf". Die Kunde N.F. (in German). 6. Niedersächsischer Landesverein für Urgeschichte: 25–33. ISSN 0342-0736.
- Wegewitz, Willi (1941). "Die Scheibenfibel von Tangendorf, Kr. Harburg". Die Kunde (in German). 9. Niedersächsischer Landesverein für Urgeschichte: 36–41. ISSN 0342-0736.

This article has been translated in part from the German Wikipedia equivalent.
