= Tespe =

- Municipality
- Flag Coat of arms

- Location of Tespe within Harburg district
- Interactive map of Tespe
- Location within Germany Location within Lower Saxony
- Coordinates: 53°24′N 10°25′E
- Country: Germany
- State: Lower Saxony
- District: Harburg
- Municipal assoc.: Elbmarsch
- Subdivisions: 3 Ortsteile

Government
  - Mayor: Jörg Werner (SPD)

Area
  - Total: 24.87 km^{2} (9.60 sq mi)
- Elevation: 12 m (39 ft)

Population (2025-12-31)
  - Total: 4,800
  - Density: 190/km^{2} (500/sq mi)
- Time zone: UTC+01:00 (CET)
  - Summer (DST): UTC+02:00 (CEST)
- Postal codes: 21395
- Dialling codes: 04176, 04133
- Vehicle registration: WL
- Website: gemeinde-tespe.de

Tespe is a municipality in the district of Harburg, in Lower Saxony, Germany. Situated on the left bank of the river Elbe, it abuts on the district of Lüneburg at the south and the west. Tespe is 5 km southeast of Geesthacht and about 30 kilometres southeast of Hamburg.

The municipalities Tespe, Marschacht and Drage together form the Samtgemeinde Elbmarsch. On the opposite bank of the Elbe is the Krümmel Nuclear Power Plant.
