= Vierhöfen =

- Municipality
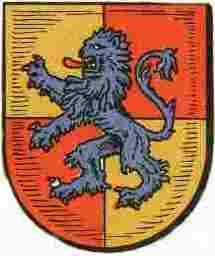
- Coat of arms

- Location of Vierhöfen within Harburg district
- Interactive map of Vierhöfen
- Location within Germany Location within Lower Saxony
- Coordinates: 53°16′N 10°13′E
- Country: Germany
- State: Lower Saxony
- District: Harburg
- Municipal assoc.: Salzhausen

Government
  - Mayor: Helmut Gehrke

Area
  - Total: 13.92 km^{2} (5.37 sq mi)
- Elevation: 28 m (92 ft)

Population (2025-12-31)
  - Total: 948
  - Density: 68.1/km^{2} (176/sq mi)
- Time zone: UTC+01:00 (CET)
  - Summer (DST): UTC+02:00 (CEST)
- Postal codes: 21444
- Dialling codes: 04172
- Vehicle registration: WL

Vierhöfen is a municipality in the district of Harburg, in Lower Saxony, Germany.
