= Horse burial =

Ritual burial of a horse

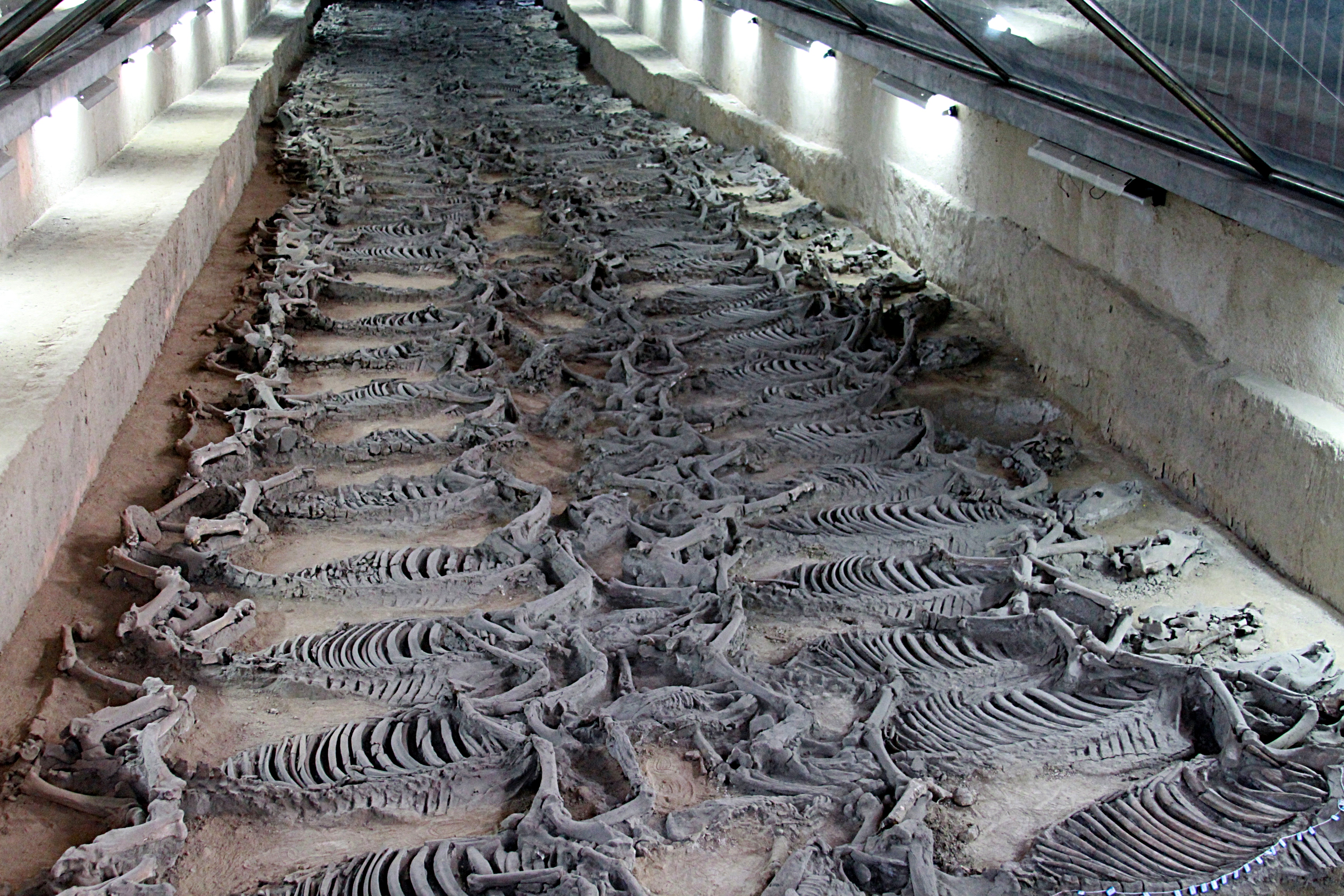
Mass horse burial for Duke Jing of Qi (reigned 547–490 BCE) of Spring and Autumn period China

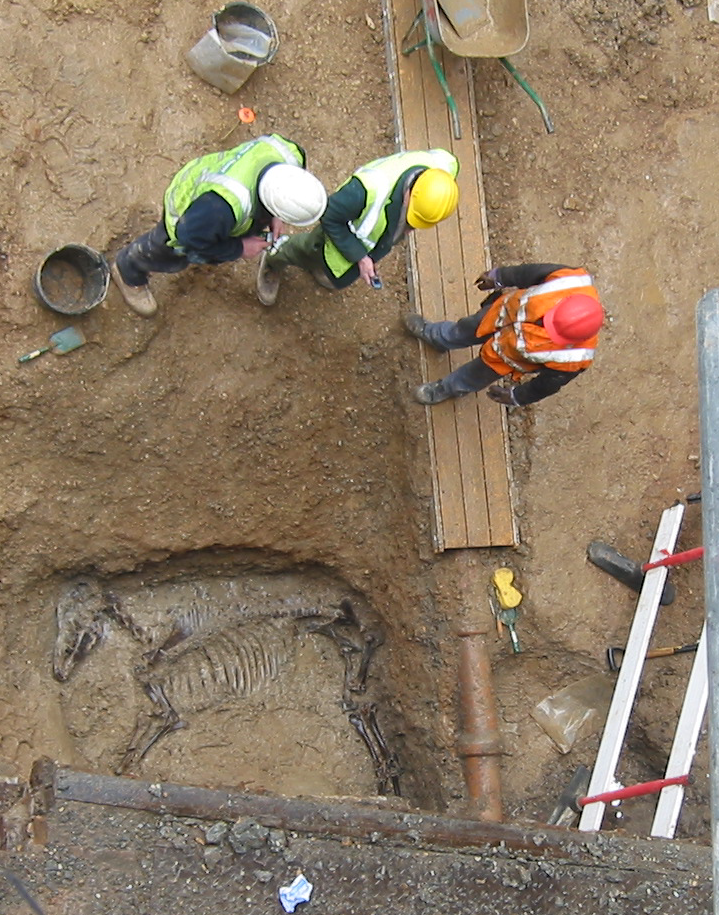
Excavating a Roman horse burial in London in 2006

Horse burial is the practice of burying a horse as part of the ritual of human burial. The practice is found among many Indo-European speaking peoples; it is also found in other cultures, including Chinese and Turkic peoples. The act indicates the high value placed on horses in the particular cultures and provides evidence of the migration of peoples with a horse culture. Human burials that contain other livestock are rare; in Britain, for example, 31 horse burials have been discovered but only one cow burial, unique in Europe. This process of horse burial is part of a wider tradition of horse sacrifice. An associated ritual is that of chariot burial, in which an entire chariot, with or without a horse, is buried with a dead person.

== Background and detail ==
The horse carries great symbolic meaning in human cultures (see horse worship). In Celtic and Germanic cultures, for instance, the horse "could be associated with the journeying sun", and horses were deified and used in divination. However, Celtic horse sacrifice is rare whereas horses were regularly sacrificed and buried alongside dead humans in Germany and Scandinavia. The Indo-European ubiquity and importance of horse sacrifice (which in many cases involves a symbolic coupling between king and mare) attests to this importance.

Considerable differences exist between different horse burials even within a single area and culture, so much so that it is perhaps impossible to generalize. Sometimes horses were cremated, sometimes buried; sometimes they were placed in the same grave as humans, sometimes in a different pit; some cultures appear to favor horse burial for male warriors, others did not seem to differentiate in sex.

== Geographical and historical distribution ==
The practice of horse burial is bound to the historical territory covered by the domesticated horse, which initially was the Eurasian Steppe, ca. 4000–3500 BCE. Early cultures with a mythology that would support horse burial are those in or bordering those areas—Turkic cultures, Chinese cultures, and Indo-European cultures.

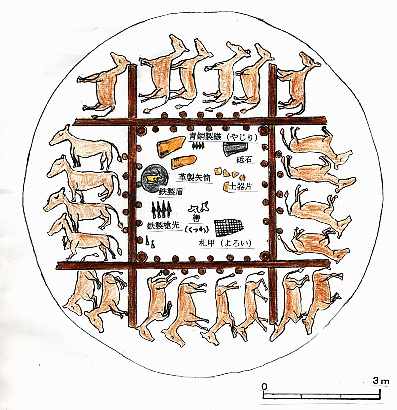
Sketch plan of the kurgan burial at Kostromskaya in southern Russia

It is claimed that a form of horse burial is attested from the Paleolithic, when the skin of a horse was hung over a pole; some of the animal's bones were left inside the skin to preserve its shape. This supposed "head and hooves" culture, however, is only one explanation for archeological finds from the third millennium BCE. The earliest proven horse burial in the Old World dates back to the fifth or fourth millennium BC and is found in S'ezzhee, in a cemetery on the Samara River from the Samara culture. Thousands of years later, Herodotus described the practice among the Scythians. Typically, such burials involved the sacrifice and burial of one or more horses to accompany the remains of high-ranked members or warriors. In China, horse burials (including chariots) are found beginning in the Shang dynasty (1600–1100 BCE). Remains of the ritual are found in Kazakh culture, where a dead person's horse is slaughtered a year after its owner's death, in a ceremony accompanied by horse races. Horse burial and related rituals survived among other peoples as well into recent times, for instance among the Nez Perce people (where skinned and stuffed horses were used as grave monuments) and the Blackfoot Confederacy.

Sites featuring horse burials are found throughout the regions of the world occupied by Indo-Aryan, Turkic, and Chinese peoples. They include Tall al-Ajjul (Gaza Strip, dating back to 1450 BCE), Central Iran, where horse burials are attested in the second millennium BC, Marlik (in Iran, from the late second millennium BCE), and Gordium (in Phrygia, with horse burials attested possibly after 700 BCE). A horse burial from Bactria provides evidence of the migration in the second millennium BCE of horse cultures from Central Asia into Turkmenistan. A horse burial in Tell el-Dab'a, Egypt, evidences the introduction of the horse to Egypt by the Hyksos, in the Second Intermediate Period of Egypt (1650–1550 BCE).

A nomad's kurgan burial of around 700 BCE at Kostromskaya in southern Russia included, as well as the principal male body with his accoutrements, thirteen humans with no adornment above him, and around the edges of the burial twenty-two horses buried in pairs. Horse burials are part of the Pazyryk burials, where lavishly decked-out horses were killed and sometimes buried in chambers separate from those containing human remains. They were characteristic in pre-Christian Hungary (one horse burial was excavated in Mikulčice, another in Sterlitamak) of the ninth and tenth centuries, especially for rich members of society, where people were buried next to the skin and the skull of a saddled horse; the rest of the horse meat was possibly eaten during a burial ceremony. Roman culture left horse burials throughout their empire, including first-century burials in modern-day Waremme, Belgium and Beuningen, Netherlands.

=== Germanic cultures ===
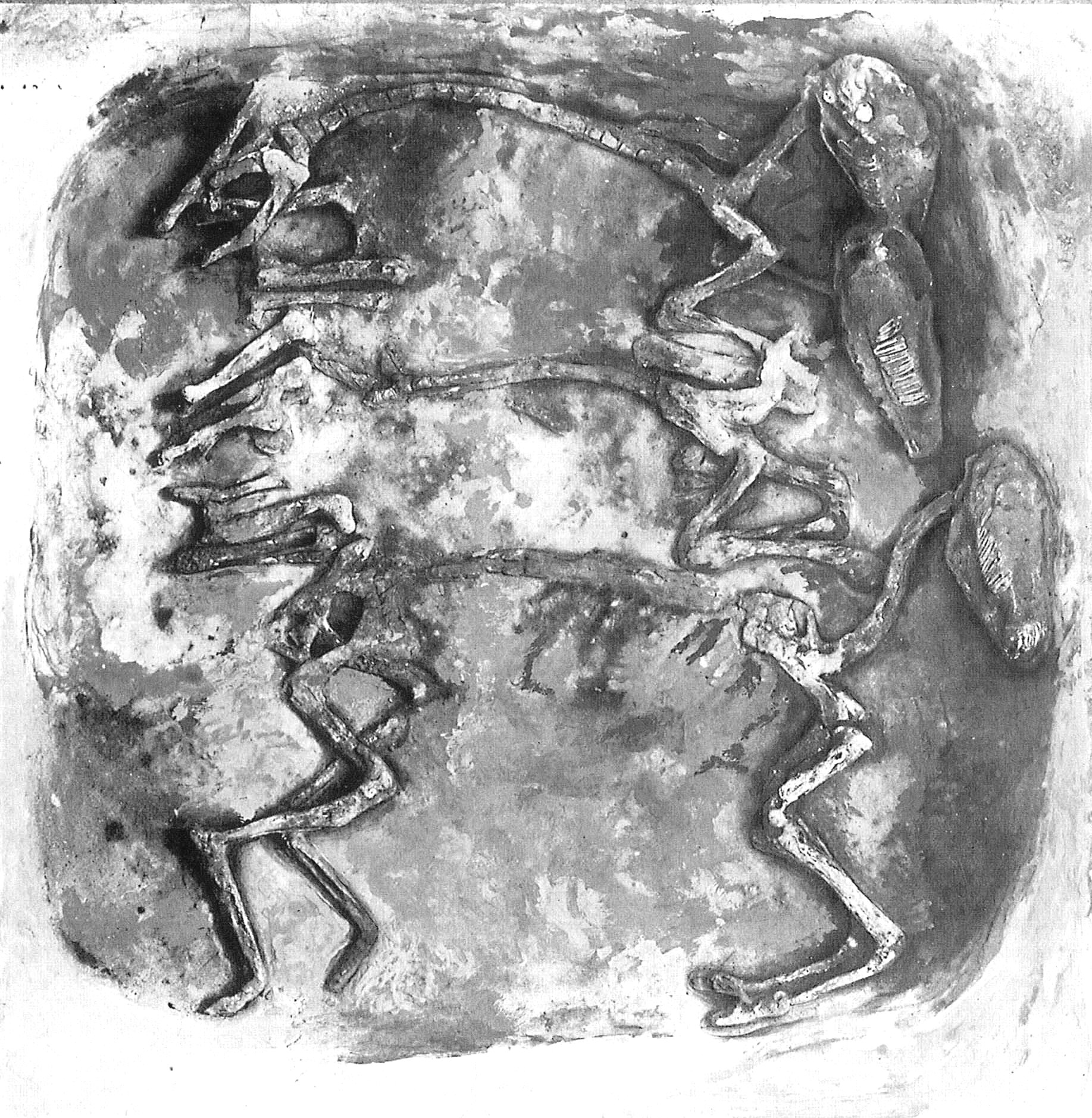
The Wulfsen horse burial shown in situ

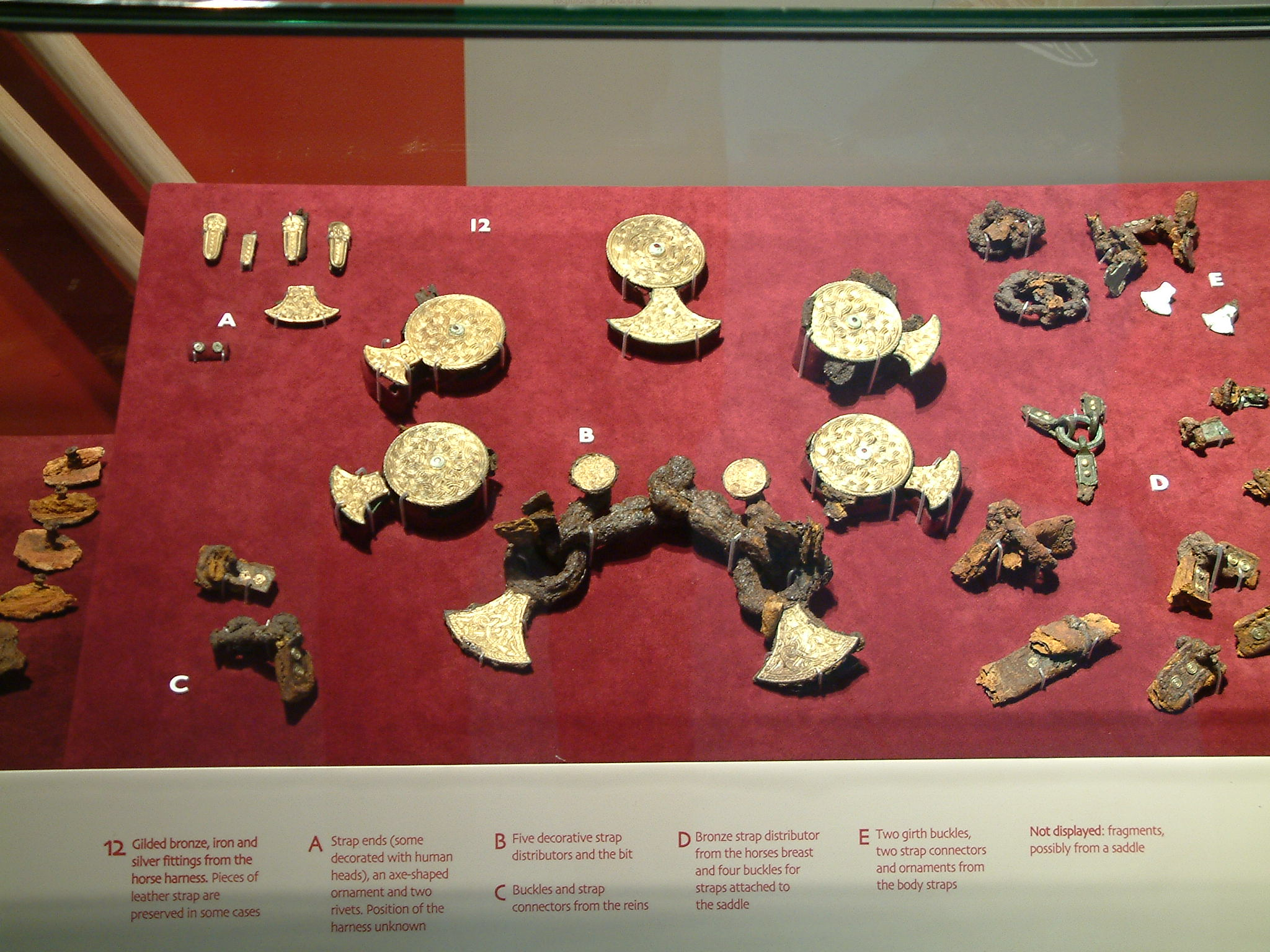
Remains of the horse burial in Mound 17, Sutton Hoo

Germanic peoples attached great significance to the horse; a horse may have been an acquaintance of the god Wodan, and they may have been (according to Tacitus) confidants of the gods. Scandinavian literature from the 8th to 11th centuries emphasizes the importance of horses in Viking society. Horses were closely associated with gods, especially Odin and Freyr. Horses played a central role in funerary practices as well as in other rituals. Horses were prominent symbols of fertility, and there were many horse fertility cults. The rituals associated with these include horse fights, burials, consumption of horse meat, and horse sacrifice.

Hengist and Horsa, the mythical ancestors of the Anglo-Saxons, were associated with horses, and references to horses are found throughout Anglo-Saxon literature. Actual horse burials in England are relatively rare and "may point to influence from the continent". A well-known Anglo-Saxon horse burial (from the sixth/seventh century) is Mound 17 at Sutton Hoo, a few yards from the more famous ship burial in Mound 1. A sixth-century grave near Lakenheath, Suffolk, yielded the body of a man next to that of a "complete horse in harness, with a bucket of food by its head." Another prominent example is the Wulfsen horse burial dated to 700–800 CE, near Hamburg, Germany.

Horse burials are relatively widespread in Iceland; as of 1999, 115 graves were found that contained the remains of horses. There were so many graves in which the remains of a human female was associated with those of a horse, that it was speculated that a horse burial in association with a male warrior did not occur in Iceland.

Examination of the archaeological record in Norway has revealed some patterns that are comparable to horse burials in other areas. Of the six-hundred graves excavated forty of them are horse burials. Horse burials are found in both Norway and Iceland to occur more frequently with males, but are not exclusive to males. There are some female burials with horses, but a significantly lower number of them are found. Most graves are covered by circular or oval mounds. The grave goods found in Viking burials associated with horses in Norway and Iceland are also pretty similar. For male burials there are usually found weapons and tools, and women are usually found with tools, beads, brooches. Both genders are often found buried with riding equipment like horse bits and headstalls.

Viking burial rituals were complex and dramatic. One witness Ibn Fadlan Risala describes the ship burial ritual in detail. The burial consisted of days of mourning, sewing special burial clothes, dog sacrifice, running horses then cutting them into pieces and putting them in the ship with the deceased, and burning the whole thing. This shows that horse slaughter was dramatic and memorable; it was noted in this story. Also taking into consideration the economic value of horses, it was probably not a decision taken lightly. Given the public display of the sacrifice, it could not have solely been for personal religious reasons and could have had important social implications as well.

=== Celtic cultures ===
Archaeologists found that horses were killed and their whole bodies carefully buried at some Gaulish and British sanctuaries. At Gournay-sur-Aronde, the animals were left to decompose before their bones were buried around the bounds of the sanctuary along with numerous broken weapons. This was repeated at regular intervals of about ten years. Some southern British tribes carefully buried horses and dogs in grain storage pits. It is believed these were thanksgiving sacrifices to underworld gods once the stores reached the end of their use.

=== Chinese culture ===
Horse burials are well known from Ancient China as well, beginning with the Shang dynasty. Particularly notable is the tomb of Duke Jing of Qi (reigned 547–490 BCE), which contained a separate pit with the remains of possibly over 600 horses. Later burials, especially from the Tang dynasty, featured the well-known pottery horses.

== Bibliography ==
- Loumand, Ulla, "The Horse and its role in Icelandic burial practices, mythology, and society," in Old Norse Religion in Long-term Perspectives Origins, Changes, and Interactions, ed. Andren, Anders, Kristina Jennbert, and Catharina Raudvere, pp. 130–33. Lund, Sweden: Nordic Academic, 2006. ISBN 918911681X
- Bonser, Wilfrid, "Magical Practices against Elves." Folklore 37.4 (1926): 350–63.
- Jennbert, Kristina. Animals and Humans: Recurrent Symbiosis in Archaeology and Old Norse Religion. Lund, Sweden: Nordic Academic, 2011.
- Sikora, Maeve. "Diversity in Viking Age Horse Burial: A Comparative Study of Norway, Iceland, Scotland and Ireland." The Journal of Irish Archaeology 12/13 (2003/2004): 87–109.
- Turville-Petre, Joan. “Hengest and Horsa.” Saga-Book of the Viking Society, 14 (1953–57), 273–290
- Simpson, Jacqueline. "Some Scandinavian Sacrifices." Folklore 78.3 (1967): 190–202.
