= Wulfsen horse burial =

Early medieval burial of horses in Germany

- Pferdebestattung von Wulfsen (German)
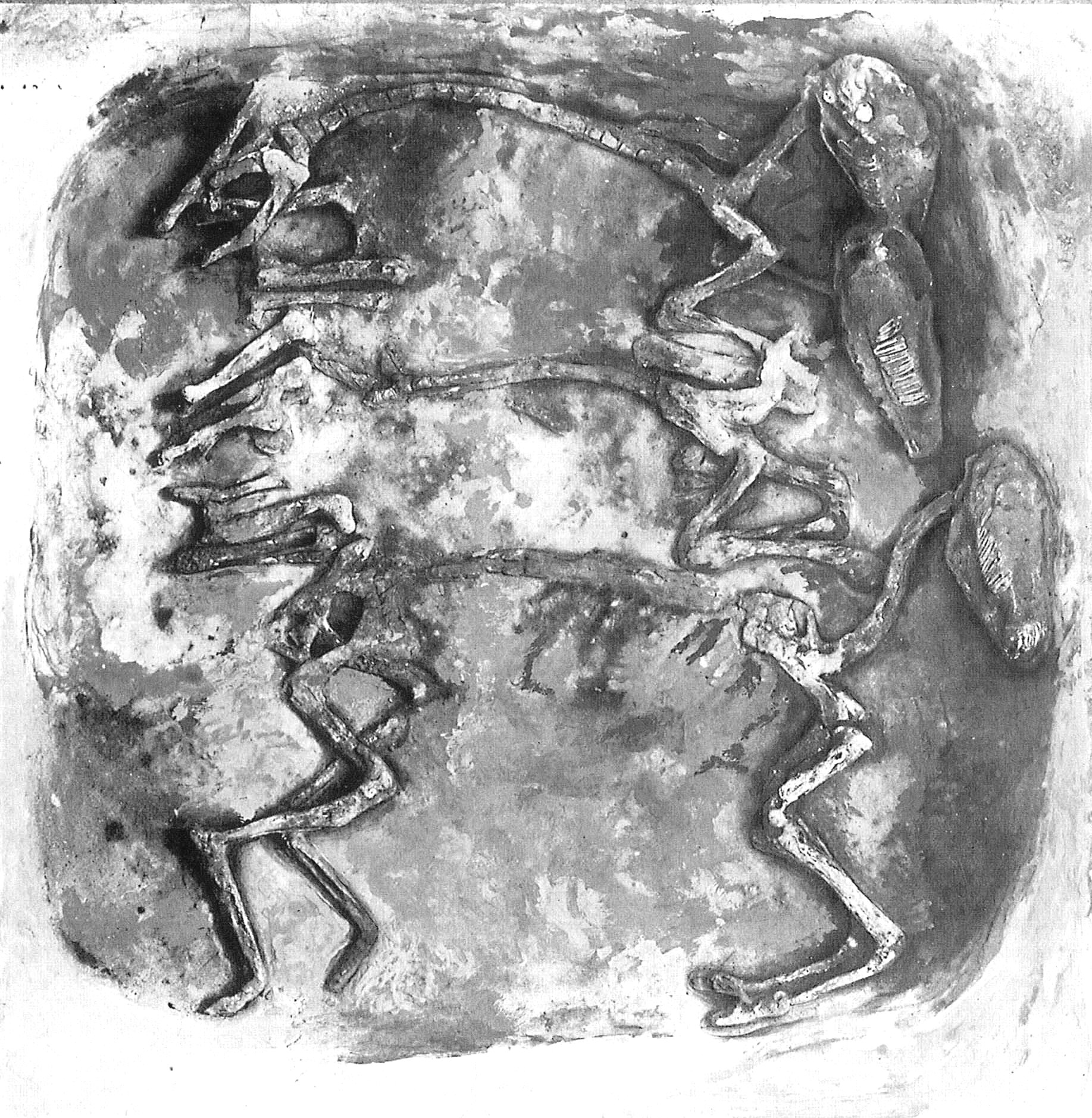
- The horse grave of Wulfsen shown in situ

- Location within Germany
- 53°18′23″N 10°09′30″E
- Type: Grave
- Periods: Early Middle Ages
- Cultures: Saxon
- Location: Wulfsen, Lower Saxony, Germany
- Region: Old Saxony

History
- Built: 700 to 800 AD

Site notes
- Length: 230 cm (91 in)
- Width: 240 cm (94 in)
- Excavation dates: 1974

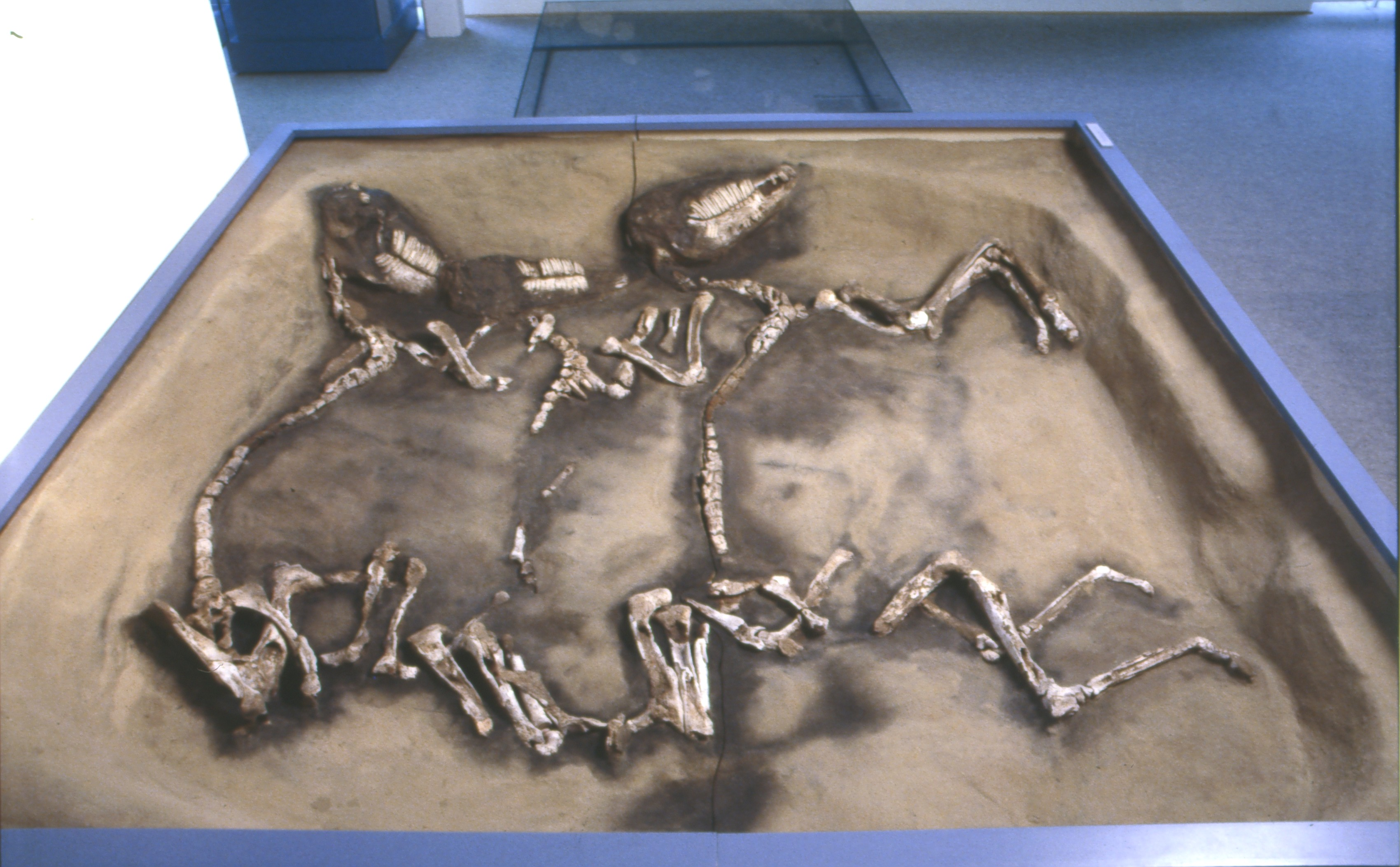
Presentation of the burial site model in the permanent collection. Shown in 2008.

The Wulfsen horse burial (German: Pferdebestattung von Wulfsen) is an early medieval horse burial, consisting of three horses, that was discovered in 1974 in a Saxon grave field in the village of Wulfsen, in the German district of Harburg. The find was rescued as a varnish profile, which is on display in the permanent exhibition of the Archaeological Museum Hamburg in Harburg, Hamburg.

== Discovery ==
The archaeological site was located on the northeastern escarpment of a sand pit near Wulfsen. In summer of 1974 a fossil collector observed a discoloration of the soil, which he considered of archaeological interest. He reported his observation to the Museum of the Principality of Lüneburg, which forwarded the message to the Helms-Museum in Hamburg-Harburg being the archaeological authority for the region. An excavation was conducted on the already disturbed burial site, which unearthed 35 human burials and the horse burial, containing the three horses. Due to the sandy soil, preservation of the burials was relatively poor. In total 26 older burials, oriented in north-south direction and nine younger burials oriented in east-west direction were excavated. Except for two arrowheads in a young person's grave, no other grave goods were observed.

== Horse burial ==
The three horses were buried in a steep-walled pit of 230 centimetres (91 in) by 240 centimetres (94 in). The bodies of the animals were fully decomposed, only bones and teeth remaining, but the bones were very brittle and fragile. Offerings or grave goods such as bridles were not detected. All the horses were lying on their left side, orientated in south–north direction. Their heads were placed in an upright posture on an elevated part of the pit. The middle horse was lying with its abdomen in a ventral position. The legs of the middle and eastern animal were sharply flexed. The legs of the western horse were lying in a half-extended position; it occupied about half of the pit's space. By use of a working platform, the bones were carefully exposed and soaked with cold glue, the pit was then laminated with lacquer and crêpe paper. The single bones were further secured with wires and pins. Then the pit was filled with a construction foam, secured in a wooden crate and recovered as a block. The entire object consists of a prepared sand layer of about 3 millimetres (0.12 in) to 4 millimetres (0.16 in) millimeters thickness with the embedded bone. The poor preservation of the bones complicated zoological investigations. The western horse was likely a mare, the others stallions. Their withers has been between 130 centimetres (51 in) and 140 centimetres (55 in), which is relatively small compared to today's standards, but was average for those days. The ages of the animals have been determined between five and seven years.

== Interpretation ==
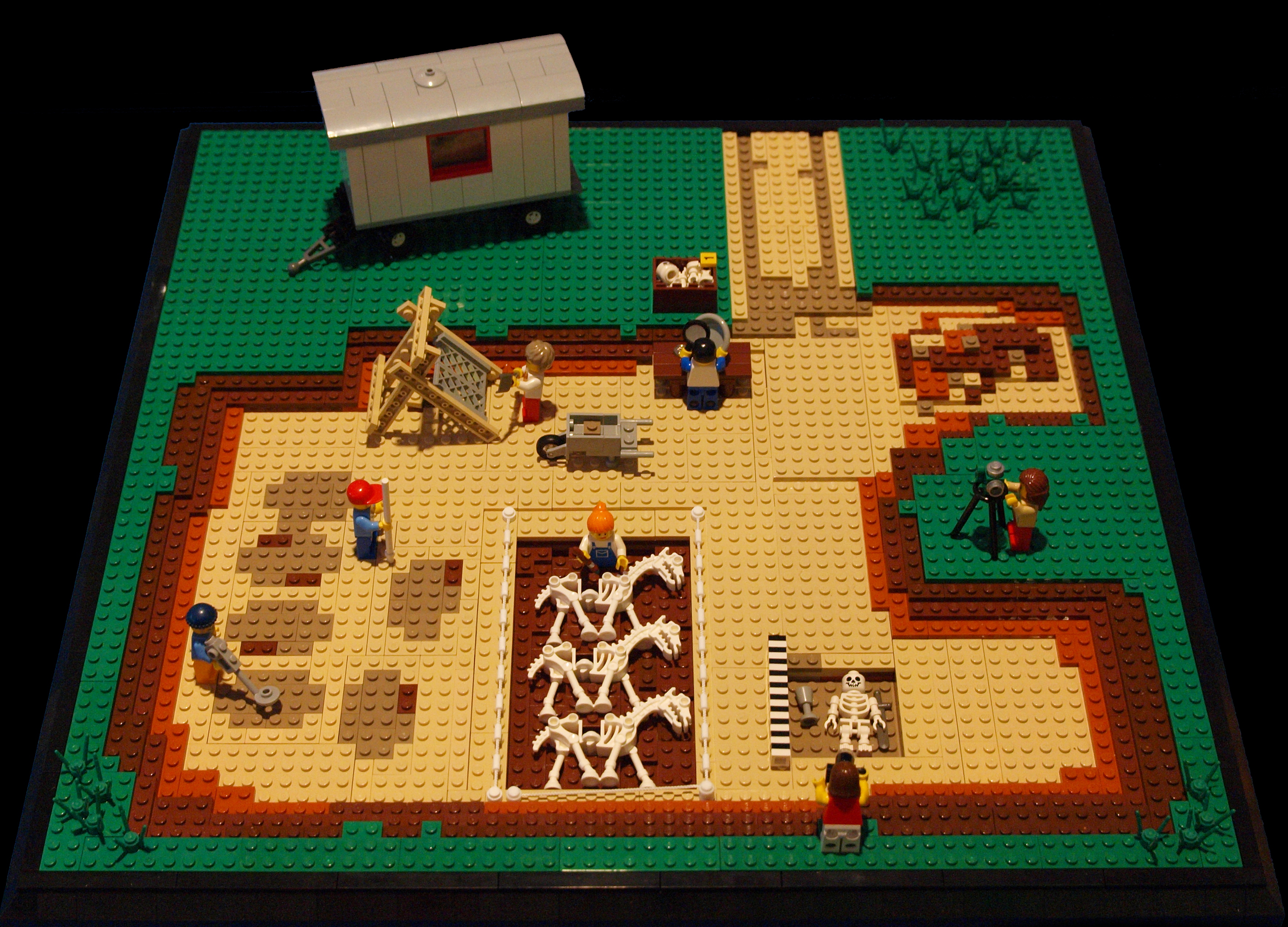
The excavation of the Wulfsen horse burial as a LEGO miniature

Based on evidence such as mortuary practice, the geographical orientation of remains and their grave goods, the burial was dated to 700–800 AD. The younger burials especially are dated to a period shortly before the wide Christianization of the region, which resulted in fundamental changes of burial practices. The horse burial could not be clearly assigned to one of the warrior's graves, therefore it is unclear whether it was an individual burial of the animals or it was an addition to one of the human interments. Funerals of animals, especially of individual horses are well known from many grave fields of the Early Middle Ages. Similar burial sites have been found in Suffolk, England. Triple horse burials, for example, were discovered near Griefstedt (Sömmerda (district)) in Thuringia and Beckum (Warendorf (district)) in North Rhine-Westphalia, but for north-eastern Lower-Saxony it is unprecedented.

A LEGO miniature of the excavation of Wulfsen horse burial was built in 2013 for the special exhibition LEGO Zeitreise (LEGO time travel) of Archäologische Museum Hamburg.

== Bibliography ==
- Busch, Ralf (2000). "Dreifachbestattung aus Wulfsen, Lkr. Harburg". In Busch, Ralf (ed.). Opferplatz und Heiligtum, Kult der Vorzeit in Norddeutschland (in German). Neumünster: Wachholtz. pp. 216–217. ISBN 3-529-02010-9.
- Ahrens, Claus (1975). "Ein neues spätsächsisches Gräberfeld mit Dreifach-Pferdebestattung bei Wulfsen, Kreis Harburg". Hammaburg N.F. (in German). 2: 119–124. ISSN 0173-0886.
- Reichenstein, Hans (1975). "Bemerkungen zu der Pferdebestattung von Wulfsen aus zoologisch-haustierkundlicher Sicht". Hammaburg N.F. (in German). 2: 125–126. ISSN 0173-0886.
