= Welle, Germany =

Welle
- Municipality
- Coat of arms

- Location of Welle within Harburg district
- Interactive map of Welle
- Location within Germany Location within Lower Saxony
- Coordinates: 53°13′N 9°48′E
- Country: Germany
- State: Lower Saxony
- District: Harburg
- Municipal assoc.: Tostedt

Government
  - Mayor: Gerd Schröder

Area
  - Total: 20.04 km^{2} (7.74 sq mi)
- Elevation: 49 m (161 ft)

Population (2025-12-31)
  - Total: 1,227
  - Density: 61.23/km^{2} (158.6/sq mi)
- Time zone: UTC+01:00 (CET)
  - Summer (DST): UTC+02:00 (CEST)
- Postal codes: 21261
- Dialling codes: 04188
- Vehicle registration: WL
- Website: Gemeinde Welle

Welle (German pronunciation: [ˈvɛlə]; Low German: Will) is a municipality in the district of Harburg, in Lower Saxony, Germany.
