= Stelle, Germany =

Stelle
- Municipality
- Coat of arms

- Location of Stelle within Harburg district
- Interactive map of Stelle
- Location within Germany Location within Lower Saxony
- Coordinates: 53°22′N 10°07′E
- Country: Germany
- State: Lower Saxony
- District: Harburg
- Subdivisions: 7 districts

Government
  - Mayor (2016–24): Robert Isernhagen (Ind.)

Area
  - Total: 38.50 km^{2} (14.86 sq mi)
- Elevation: 2 m (6.6 ft)

Population (2025-12-31)
  - Total: 12,082
  - Density: 313.8/km^{2} (812.8/sq mi)
- Time zone: UTC+01:00 (CET)
  - Summer (DST): UTC+02:00 (CEST)
- Postal codes: 21435
- Dialling codes: 04174
- Vehicle registration: WL

Stelle (German pronunciation: [ˈʃtɛlə]; Low German: Stell) is a municipality in the district of Harburg, in Lower Saxony, Germany. It is situated approximately 20 km southeast of Hamburg, and 7 km west of Winsen (Luhe). It is twinned with the village of Glenfield in Leicestershire, England and with the village of Plouzané (Brittany, France).
