= Julia Verlinden =

German politician (born 1979)

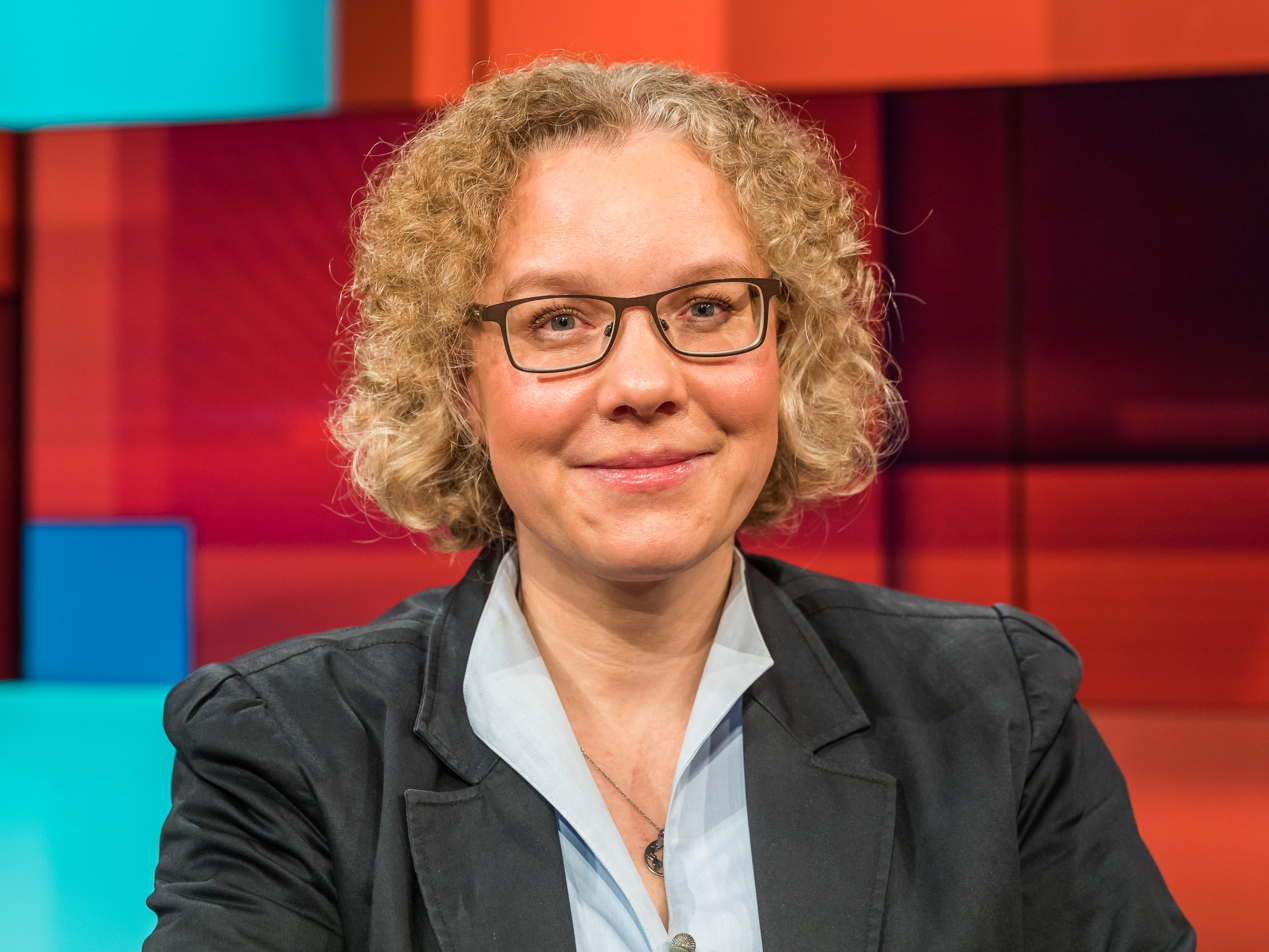
- Verlinden in 2023

Member of the Bundestag for Lower Saxony
- Incumbent
- Assumed office 26 September 2021

Personal details
- Born: 18 January 1979 (age 47) Bergisch Gladbach, West Germany (now Germany)
- Party: Greens
- Education: University of Lüneburg

Julia Verlinden (born 18 January 1979) is a German politician of the Alliance 90/The Greens who has been serving as a member of the Bundestag from the state of Lower Saxony since 2013.

== Early life and career ==
Verlinden was born on 18 January 1979 in Bergisch Gladbach. She studied environmental sciences at the University of Lüneburg from 1998 to 2005 and graduated with a diploma. From 2006 to 2013 she was a research associate at the Federal Environment Agency (UBA) in Dessau. In late 2012 she received her Doctor of Philosophy under Thomas Saretzki at her alma mater in a thesis called "Energieeffizienzpolitik als Beitrag zum Klimaschutz", which analyzed the implementation of EU building directives in Germany. From January 2013 until she moved to the Bundestag in October 2013, she headed the Energy Efficiency Division at the Federal Environment Agency.

== Political career ==
From 2002 to 2006 she was a councillor in the Lüneburg city council, which she returned to doing starting in 2021. She then became a member of the Lüneburg district council from 2006 to 2011. During this time, she was also a member of the party council for The Greens.

Verlinden became a member of the Bundestag in the 2013 German federal election. From 2013 to 2021, she was a member of the Committee for Economic Affairs and Energy and served as her parliamentary group's spokesperson for energy policy.

Since 2021, Verlinden has been serving as one of her parliamentary group's deputy chairs, under the leadership of co-chairs Britta Haßelmann and Katharina Dröge.

Verlinden contested Lüchow-Dannenberg – Lüneburg in 2013, 2017 and 2021.

== Other activities ==
- Agora Energiewende, Member of the Council (since 2022)
- Federal Bioenergy Association (BBE), Member of the Advisory Board
- German Industry Initiative for Energy Efficiency (DENEFF), Member of the Parliamentary Advisory Board (since 2018)
- German Renewable Energy Federation (BEE), Member of the Parliamentary Advisory Board
- German Federation for the Environment and Nature Conservation (BUND), Member
- German United Services Trade Union (ver.di), Member
