= Gödenstorf =

- Municipality
- Location of Gödenstorf within Harburg district
- Interactive map of Gödenstorf
- Location within Germany Location within Lower Saxony
- Coordinates: 53°13′N 10°07′E
- Country: Germany
- State: Lower Saxony
- District: Harburg
- Municipal assoc.: Salzhausen
- Subdivisions: 2

Government
  - Mayor: Eckhard Schröder

Area
  - Total: 16.54 km^{2} (6.39 sq mi)
- Elevation: 49 m (161 ft)

Population (2025-12-31)
  - Total: 1,080
  - Density: 65.3/km^{2} (169/sq mi)
- Time zone: UTC+01:00 (CET)
  - Summer (DST): UTC+02:00 (CEST)
- Postal codes: 21376
- Dialling codes: 04172
- Vehicle registration: WL

Gödenstorf is a municipality in the district of Harburg, in Lower Saxony, Germany.
