= Regesbostel =

- Municipality
- Flag Coat of arms

- Location of Regesbostel within Harburg district
- Interactive map of Regesbostel
- Location within Germany Location within Lower Saxony
- Coordinates: 53°22′N 09°39′E
- Country: Germany
- State: Lower Saxony
- District: Harburg
- Municipal assoc.: Hollenstedt
- Subdivisions: 2

Government
  - Mayor: Bernd Mißfeld

Area
  - Total: 16.27 km^{2} (6.28 sq mi)
- Elevation: 34 m (112 ft)

Population (2025-12-31)
  - Total: 1,050
  - Density: 64.5/km^{2} (167/sq mi)
- Time zone: UTC+01:00 (CET)
  - Summer (DST): UTC+02:00 (CEST)
- Postal codes: 21649
- Dialling codes: 04165
- Vehicle registration: WL

Regesbostel is a municipality in the district of Harburg, in Lower Saxony, Germany.
