= Jakob Blankenburg =

German politician (born 1997)

Jakob Blankenburg MdB

Member of the Bundestag; for Lüchow-Dannenberg – Lüneburg
- Incumbent
- Assumed office 26 September 2021
- Preceded by: Eckhard Pols

Personal details
- Born: 5 August 1997 (age 29) Uelzen, Germany
- Party: Social Democratic
- Education: University of Hanover
- Website: jakobblankenburg.de

Jakob Blankenburg (born 5 August 1997) is a German politician of the Social Democratic Party (SPD) who has been serving as a member of the German Bundestag since 2021, representing the Lüchow-Dannenberg – Lüneburg district.

== Early life and education ==
From 2015 to 2021, Blankenburg studied political science at Leibniz University Hannover. During his studies, he did an internship with Lars Klingbeil.

== Political career ==
In parliament, Blankenburg has been serving on the Committee on the Environment, Nature Conservation, Nuclear Safety and Consumer Protection and the Parliamentary Advisory Board on Sustainable Development. Since the 2025 elections, he has been his parliamentary group's spokesperson on the environment and climate protection.

Within his parliamentary group, Blankenburg belongs to the Parliamentary Left, a left-wing movement.
