= Toppenstedt =

- Municipality
- Coat of arms

- Location of Toppenstedt within Harburg district
- Interactive map of Toppenstedt
- Location within Germany Location within Lower Saxony
- Coordinates: 53°16′N 10°06′E
- Country: Germany
- State: Lower Saxony
- District: Harburg
- Municipal assoc.: Salzhausen
- Subdivisions: 2

Government
  - Mayor: Heinrich Nottorf

Area
  - Total: 29.09 km^{2} (11.23 sq mi)
- Elevation: 35 m (115 ft)

Population (2025-12-31)
  - Total: 2,203
  - Density: 75.73/km^{2} (196.1/sq mi)
- Time zone: UTC+01:00 (CET)
  - Summer (DST): UTC+02:00 (CEST)
- Postal codes: 21442
- Dialling codes: 04173
- Vehicle registration: WL

Toppenstedt is a municipality in the district of Harburg, in Lower Saxony, Germany, not very far from the Lüneburg Heath.

It consists of two villages: Toppenstedt and Tangendorf. In both villages agriculture and tourism are key economic factors.

In 1930, a farmer discovered during his work the Tangendorf disc brooch, a fibula, dating from about 300 AD. An image of this fibula is part of Toppenstedt 's coat of arms.
