= Asendorf, Harburg =

Asendorf
- Municipality
- Coat of arms

- Location of Asendorf within Harburg district
- Interactive map of Asendorf
- Location within Germany Location within Lower Saxony
- Coordinates: 53°17′33″N 09°58′51″E
- Country: Germany
- State: Lower Saxony
- District: Harburg
- Municipal assoc.: Hanstedt

Government
  - Mayor: Peter Muus

Area
  - Total: 14.69 km^{2} (5.67 sq mi)
- Elevation: 32 m (105 ft)

Population (2025-12-31)
  - Total: 2,188
  - Density: 148.9/km^{2} (385.8/sq mi)
- Time zone: UTC+01:00 (CET)
  - Summer (DST): UTC+02:00 (CEST)
- Postal codes: 21271
- Dialling codes: 04183
- Vehicle registration: WL

Asendorf (German pronunciation: [ˈaːzn̩dɔʁf]) is a municipality in the district of Harburg, in Lower Saxony, Germany.
