= Wulfsen =

- Municipality
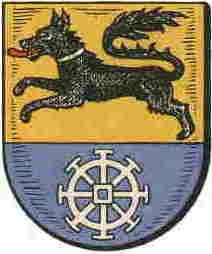
- Coat of arms

- Location of Wulfsen within Harburg district
- Interactive map of Wulfsen
- Location within Germany Location within Lower Saxony
- Coordinates: 53°18′N 10°09′E
- Country: Germany
- State: Lower Saxony
- District: Harburg
- Municipal assoc.: Salzhausen

Government
  - Mayor: Gerd Müller (CDU)

Area
  - Total: 8.42 km^{2} (3.25 sq mi)
- Elevation: 22 m (72 ft)

Population (2025-12-31)
  - Total: 1,669
  - Density: 198/km^{2} (513/sq mi)
- Time zone: UTC+01:00 (CET)
  - Summer (DST): UTC+02:00 (CEST)
- Postal codes: 21445
- Dialling codes: 04173
- Vehicle registration: WL

Wulfsen is a municipality in the district of Harburg, in Lower Saxony, Germany.

== See also ==
- Wulfsen horse burial
