= Marxen =

- Municipality
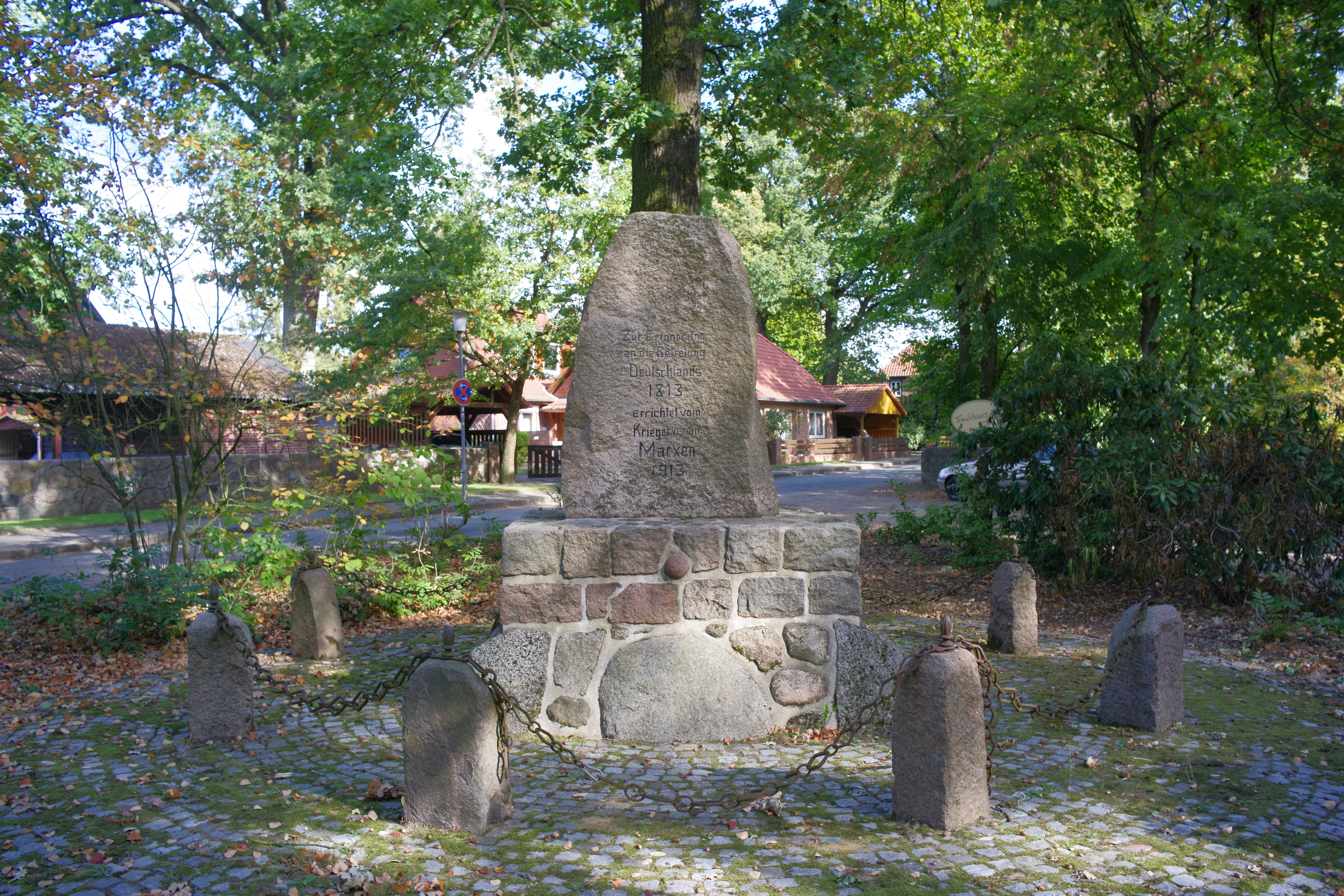
- Battle of Leipzig Memorial in Marxen

- Coat of arms

- Location of Marxen within Harburg district
- Interactive map of Marxen
- Location within Germany Location within Lower Saxony
- Coordinates: 53°19′N 10°01′E
- Country: Germany
- State: Lower Saxony
- District: Harburg
- Municipal assoc.: Hanstedt
- Subdivisions: 2

Government
  - Mayor: Christian Jedamski

Area
  - Total: 13.31 km^{2} (5.14 sq mi)
- Elevation: 43 m (141 ft)

Population (2025-12-31)
  - Total: 1,459
  - Density: 109.6/km^{2} (283.9/sq mi)
- Time zone: UTC+01:00 (CET)
  - Summer (DST): UTC+02:00 (CEST)
- Postal codes: 21439
- Dialling codes: 04185
- Vehicle registration: WL

Marxen is a municipality in the district of Harburg, in Lower Saxony, in northern Germany.

== History ==
During the final stages of World War II, on 22 March 1945, Marxen was the site of a stopover during the German-organised march of Polish prisoners of war from the Oflag II-D camp to the Stalag X-B camp.
