= Eckhard Pols =

German politician

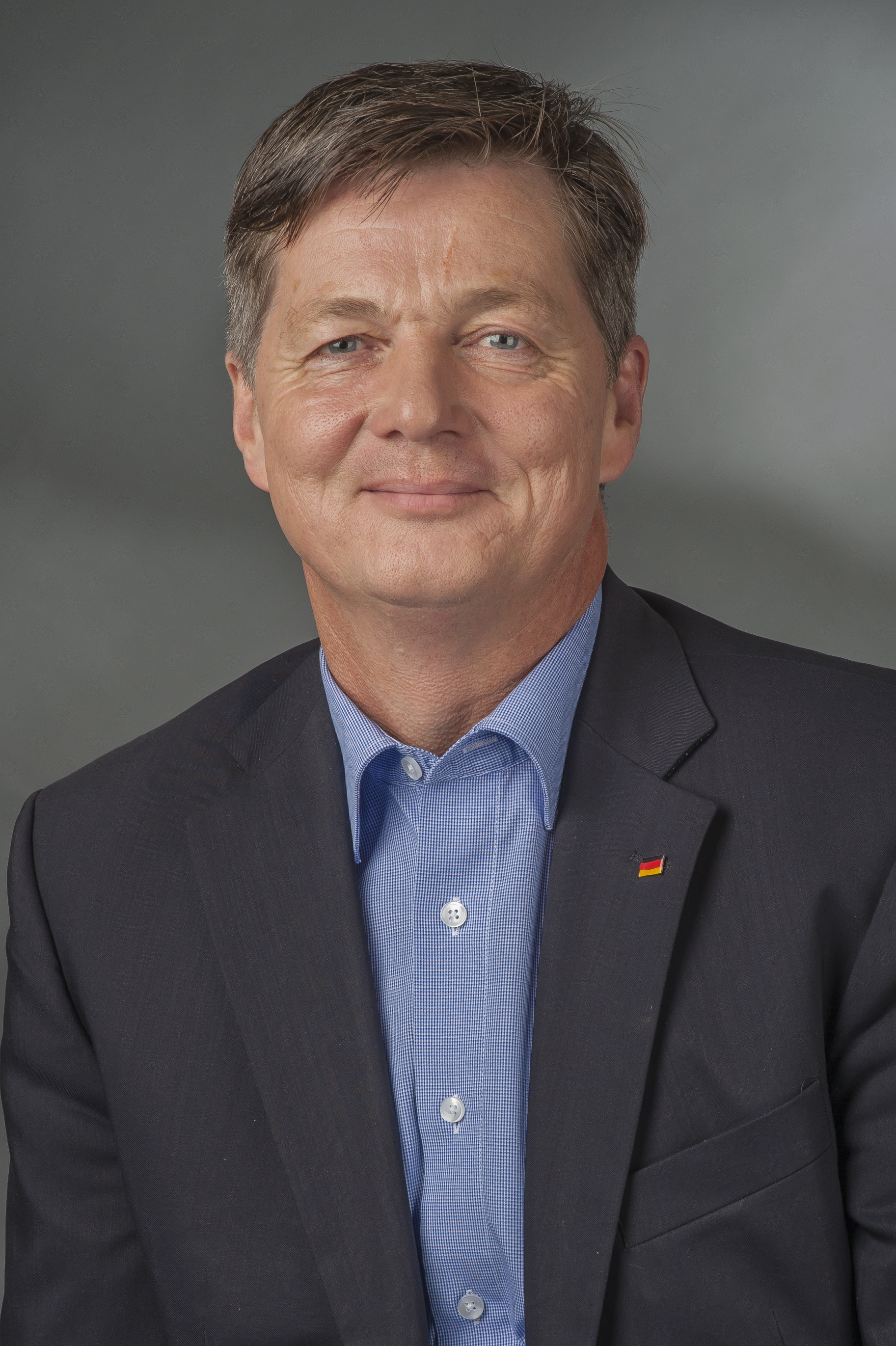
- Pols in 2014

Member of the Bundestag; for Lüchow-Dannenberg – Lüneburg
- In office 27 October 2009 – 26 October 2021
- Preceded by: Hedi Wegener
- Succeeded by: Jakob Blankenburg

Personal details
- Born: 14 March 1962 (age 64) Lüneburg, West Germany
- Party: Christian Democratic Union
- Children: 5

Eckhard Pols (born 14 March 1962) is a German politician of the Christian Democratic Union (CDU) who was a member of the Bundestag from the state of Lower Saxony from 2009 to 2021.

== Political career ==
Pols became a member of the Bundestag in the 2009 German federal election. In parliament, he served on the Committee on Transport and Digital Infrastructure and the Committee on Construction, Housing, Urban Development and Communities. In addition to his committee assignments, he was part of the German Parliamentary Friendship Group with Cyprus and Malta.

From 2014 to 2016, Pols was one of the members of the country's temporary National Commission on the Disposal of Radioactive Waste, chaired by Ursula Heinen-Esser and Michael Müller.

Pols lost his seat in the 2021 federal election.

== Other activities ==
- Foundation Flight, Expulsion, Reconciliation (SFVV), Member of the Board of Trustees
