= Garlstorf =

- Municipality
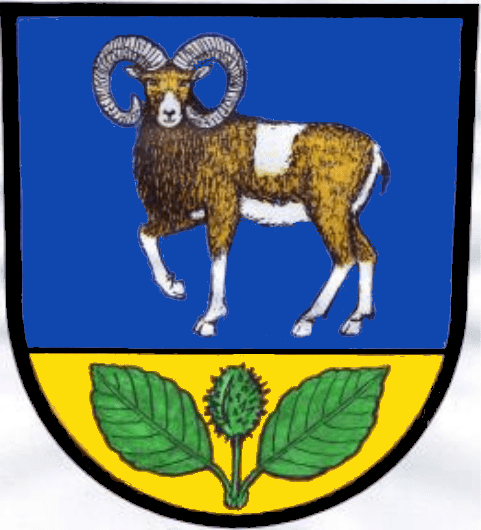
- Coat of arms

- Location of Garlstorf within Harburg district
- Interactive map of Garlstorf
- Location within Germany Location within Lower Saxony
- Coordinates: 53°13′N 10°05′E
- Country: Germany
- State: Lower Saxony
- District: Harburg
- Municipal assoc.: Salzhausen

Government
  - Mayor: Horst-Günter Jagau

Area
  - Total: 16.82 km^{2} (6.49 sq mi)
- Elevation: 53 m (174 ft)

Population (2025-12-31)
  - Total: 1,128
  - Density: 67.06/km^{2} (173.7/sq mi)
- Time zone: UTC+01:00 (CET)
  - Summer (DST): UTC+02:00 (CEST)
- Postal codes: 21376
- Dialling codes: 04172
- Vehicle registration: WL

Garlstorf is a municipality in the district of Harburg, in Lower Saxony, Germany.
