= Eyendorf =

- Municipality
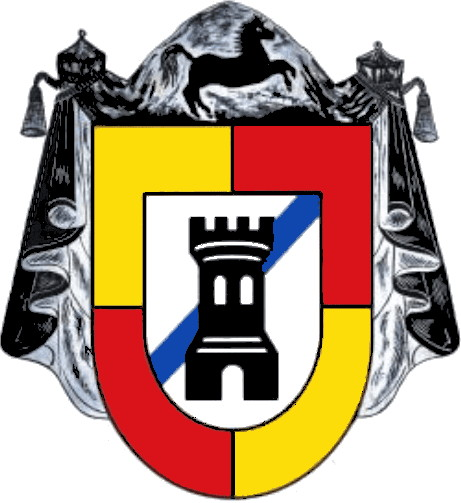
- Coat of arms

- Location of Eyendorf within Harburg district
- Interactive map of Eyendorf
- Location within Germany Location within Lower Saxony
- Coordinates: 53°12′N 10°09′E
- Country: Germany
- State: Lower Saxony
- District: Harburg
- Municipal assoc.: Salzhausen

Government
  - Mayor: Reinhold Spieker (SPD)

Area
  - Total: 13.68 km^{2} (5.28 sq mi)
- Elevation: 67 m (220 ft)

Population (2025-12-31)
  - Total: 1,249
  - Density: 91.30/km^{2} (236.5/sq mi)
- Time zone: UTC+01:00 (CET)
  - Summer (DST): UTC+02:00 (CEST)
- Postal codes: 21376
- Dialling codes: 04172
- Vehicle registration: WL

Eyendorf is a municipality in the district of Harburg, in Lower Saxony, Germany.
