= Hollenstedt =

- Municipality
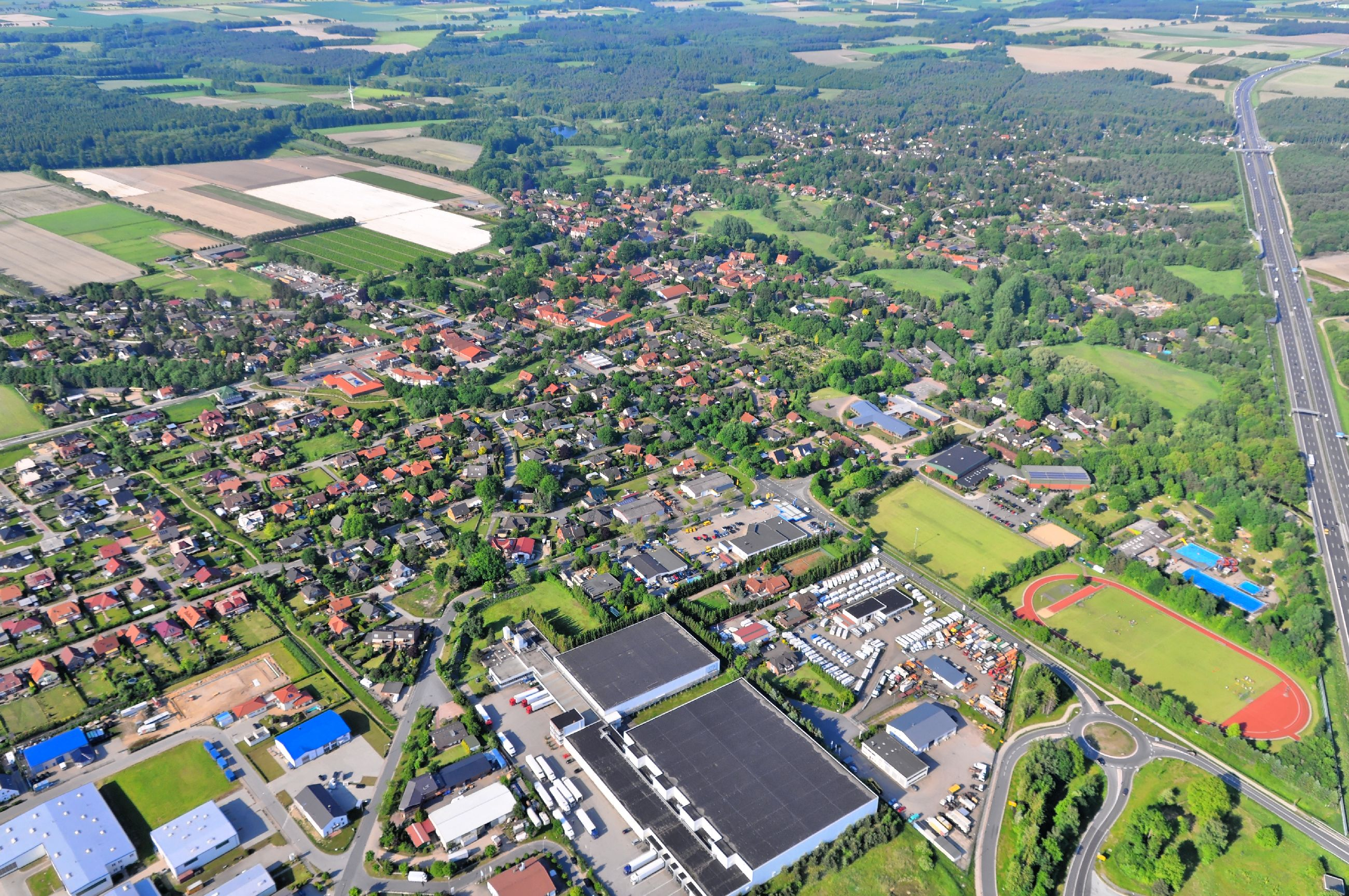
- Aerial view

- Coat of arms

- Location of Hollenstedt within Harburg district
- Interactive map of Hollenstedt
- Location within Germany Location within Lower Saxony
- Coordinates: 53°22′N 9°43′E
- Country: Germany
- State: Lower Saxony
- District: Harburg
- Municipal assoc.: Hollenstedt
- Subdivisions: 4

Government
  - Mayor: Jürgen Böhme (CDU)

Area
  - Total: 21.84 km^{2} (8.43 sq mi)
- Elevation: 30 m (98 ft)

Population (2025-12-31)
  - Total: 3,769
  - Density: 172.6/km^{2} (447.0/sq mi)
- Time zone: UTC+01:00 (CET)
  - Summer (DST): UTC+02:00 (CEST)
- Postal codes: 21279
- Dialling codes: 04165
- Vehicle registration: WL
- Website: https://www.hollenstedt.de/

Hollenstedt is a municipality in the district of Harburg, in Lower Saxony, Germany. It is situated approximately 25 km southwest of Hamburg, and 12 km south of Buxtehude.

Hollenstedt is also the seat of the Samtgemeinde ("collective municipality") Hollenstedt. It was mentioned in 804 in the Royal Frankish Annals as the residence of Charlemagne.
