= Hollenstedt (Samtgemeinde) =

Samtgemeinde in Lower Saxony, Germany

- Samtgemeinde
- Location of Hollenstedt within Harburg district
- Interactive map of Hollenstedt
- Location within Germany Location within Lower Saxony
- Coordinates: 53°22′N 9°43′E
- Country: Germany
- State: Lower Saxony
- District: Harburg
- Seat: Hollenstedt
- Subdivisions: 7 municipalities

Area
  - Total: 110.73 km^{2} (42.75 sq mi)

Population (2025-12-31)
  - Total: 12,154
  - Density: 109.76/km^{2} (284.28/sq mi)
- Time zone: UTC+01:00 (CET)
  - Summer (DST): UTC+02:00 (CEST)
- Website: www.hollenstedt.de

Hollenstedt is a Samtgemeinde ("collective municipality") in the district of Harburg, in Lower Saxony, Germany. It was created as part of municipal reorganization in Lower Saxony on 1 July 1972. Its seat is in the village Hollenstedt.

The Samtgemeinde Hollenstedt consists of the following municipalities:

1. Appel
2. Drestedt
3. Halvesbostel
4. Hollenstedt
5. Moisburg
6. Regesbostel
7. Wenzendorf

As of March 2024, construction had begun to connect four towns within the collective municipality – Wenzendorf, Winnerstorf, Dierstorf, and Dierstorf-Heide – to a fiber optic network.
