= Appel, Germany =

Appel
- Municipality
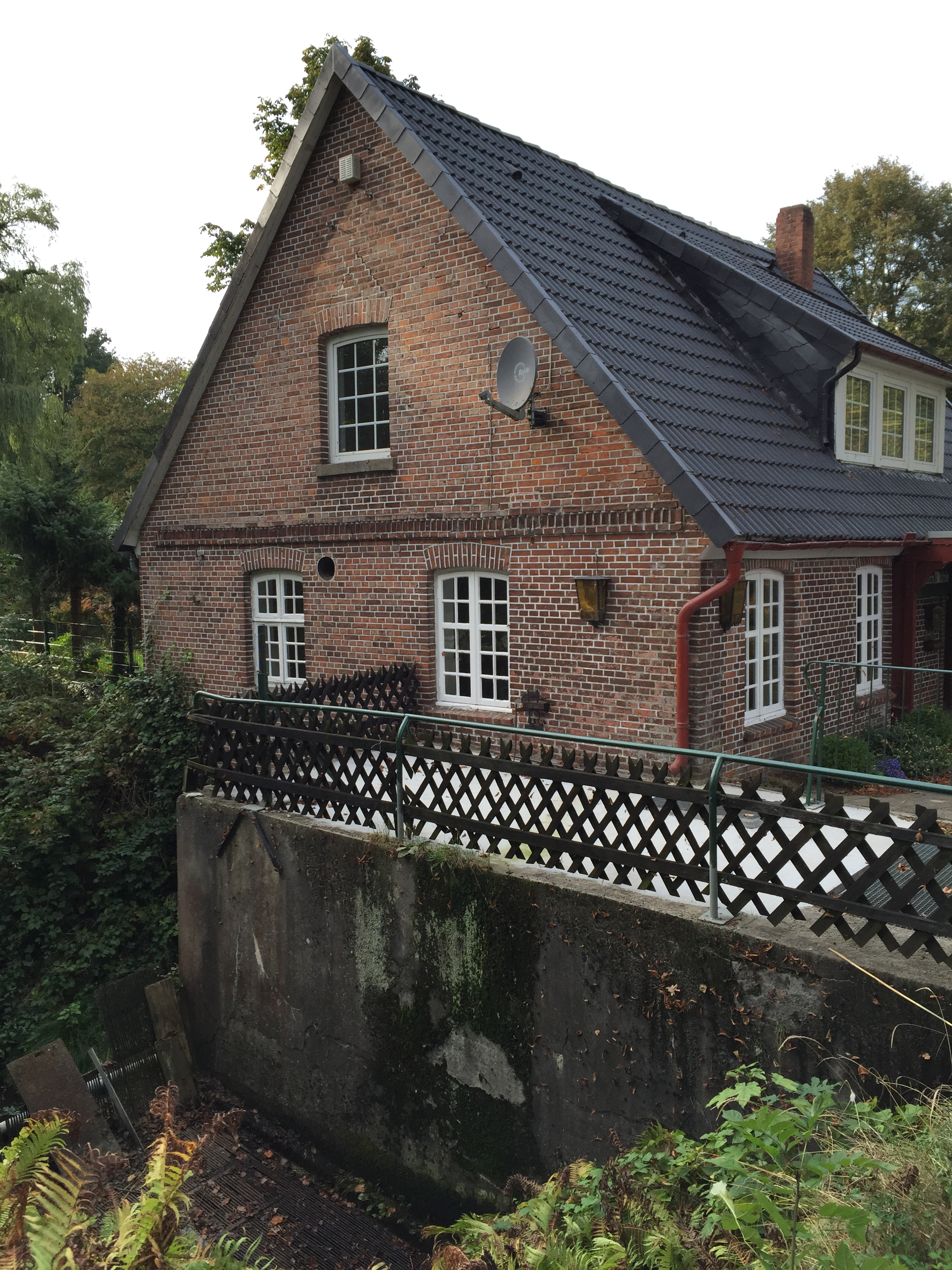

- Coat of arms

- Location of Appel within Harburg district
- Interactive map of Appel
- Location within Germany Location within Lower Saxony
- Coordinates: 53°23′35″N 09°44′50″E
- Country: Germany
- State: Lower Saxony
- District: Harburg
- Municipal assoc.: Hollenstedt
- Subdivisions: 5

Government
  - Mayor: Peter Matthies (CDU)

Area
  - Total: 15.42 km^{2} (5.95 sq mi)
- Elevation: 40 m (130 ft)

Population (2025-12-31)
  - Total: 2,096
  - Density: 135.9/km^{2} (352.1/sq mi)
- Time zone: UTC+01:00 (CET)
  - Summer (DST): UTC+02:00 (CEST)
- Postal codes: 21279
- Dialling codes: 04165
- Vehicle registration: WL

Appel is a municipality in the district of Harburg, in Lower Saxony, Germany.
