= Garstedt =

- Municipality
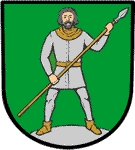
- Coat of arms

- Location of Garstedt within Harburg district
- Interactive map of Garstedt
- Location within Germany Location within Lower Saxony
- Coordinates: 53°17′N 10°09′E
- Country: Germany
- State: Lower Saxony
- District: Harburg
- Municipal assoc.: Salzhausen

Government
  - Mayor: Klaus-Peter Wind

Area
  - Total: 14.93 km^{2} (5.76 sq mi)
- Elevation: 30 m (98 ft)

Population (2025-12-31)
  - Total: 1,421
  - Density: 95.18/km^{2} (246.5/sq mi)
- Time zone: UTC+01:00 (CET)
  - Summer (DST): UTC+02:00 (CEST)
- Postal codes: 21441
- Dialling codes: 04173
- Vehicle registration: WL
- Website: www.garstedt.de

Garstedt is a municipality in the district of Harburg in Lower Saxony in Germany.
