= Wenzendorf =

- Municipality
- Flag Coat of arms

- Location of Wenzendorf within Harburg district
- Interactive map of Wenzendorf
- Location within Germany Location within Lower Saxony
- Coordinates: 53°21′N 09°46′E
- Country: Germany
- State: Lower Saxony
- District: Harburg
- Municipal assoc.: Hollenstedt
- Subdivisions: 5

Government
  - Mayor: Manfred Cohrs

Area
  - Total: 21.47 km^{2} (8.29 sq mi)
- Elevation: 64 m (210 ft)

Population (2025-12-31)
  - Total: 1,492
  - Density: 69.49/km^{2} (180.0/sq mi)
- Time zone: UTC+01:00 (CET)
  - Summer (DST): UTC+02:00 (CEST)
- Postal codes: 21279
- Dialling codes: 04165
- Vehicle registration: WL

Wenzendorf is a municipality in Lower Saxony, Germany. It is also the name of the chief village of the municipality.

The area is known mainly for the airfield near the village, where the Hamburger Flugzeugbau, the aircraft manufacturing arm of Blohm & Voss, built a factory during the Nazi era.

== Municipality ==
Wenzendorf is a municipality in the Lower Saxony district of Harburg, Germany. Its five main villages are Wenzendorf, Wennerstorf, Klauenburg, Dierstorf and Dierstorf-Heide.

Wenzendorf is the largest Christmas tree growing area in northern Germany.

=== Wenzendorf village ===
The village of Wenzendorf lies approximately 25 km southwest of Hamburg. It has a population of a little over 1,000.

== Airfield ==
Wenzendorf airfield lies about 2 km to the southeast of the main village.

=== Aircraft factory ===
In 1934, Hamburger Flugzeugbau began construction of its first dedicated aircraft factory at Wenzendorf and laid out a large aerodrome for test flying. The factory began operation in 1935, license-building the Dornier Do 23, the first of which flew in December 1935.

Not long afterwards the company adopted its parent company's name of Blohm and Voss, by which it is chiefly remembered.

A great many aircraft were assembled at Wenzendorf throughout the war period, mostly under sub-contract to other manufacturers. They included:

- Dornier Do 23
- Dornier Do 17
- Junkers W 34
- Junkers Ju 86
- Junkers Ju 88
- Blohm & Voss BV 141 prototypes and pre-production batches
- Blohm & Voss BV 155 prototypes
- Blohm & Voss BV 40 prototypes
- Messerschmitt Bf 109
- Messerschmitt Bf 110
- Messerschmitt Me 210
- Messerschmitt Me 262

On 6 October 1944 the plant was severely damaged in a bombing raid by the US Air Force, and three months later was almost completely destroyed in a second attack.

=== Modern use ===
Today, the airfield is much reduced in size. It has a single grass runway of 750m length and is home to the Airbus HFB gliding club.

Some of the old factory buildings have been converted to a retirement home.
