= Hanstedt (Samtgemeinde) =

Samtgemeinde in Lower Saxony, Germany

- Samtgemeinde
- Location of Hanstedt within Harburg district
- Interactive map of Hanstedt
- Location within Germany Location within Lower Saxony
- Coordinates: 53°16′N 10°01′E
- Country: Germany
- State: Lower Saxony
- District: Harburg
- Seat: Hanstedt
- Subdivisions: 6 municipalities

Area
  - Total: 198.64 km^{2} (76.70 sq mi)

Population (2025-12-31)
  - Total: 15,565
  - Density: 78.358/km^{2} (202.95/sq mi)
- Time zone: UTC+01:00 (CET)
  - Summer (DST): UTC+02:00 (CEST)
- Website: www.hanstedt.de

Hanstedt is a Samtgemeinde ("collective municipality") in the district of Harburg, in Lower Saxony, Germany. Its seat is in the village Hanstedt.

The Samtgemeinde Hanstedt consists of the following municipalities:

1. Asendorf
2. Brackel
3. Egestorf
4. Hanstedt
5. Marxen
6. Undeloh
