= Salzhausen =

- Municipality
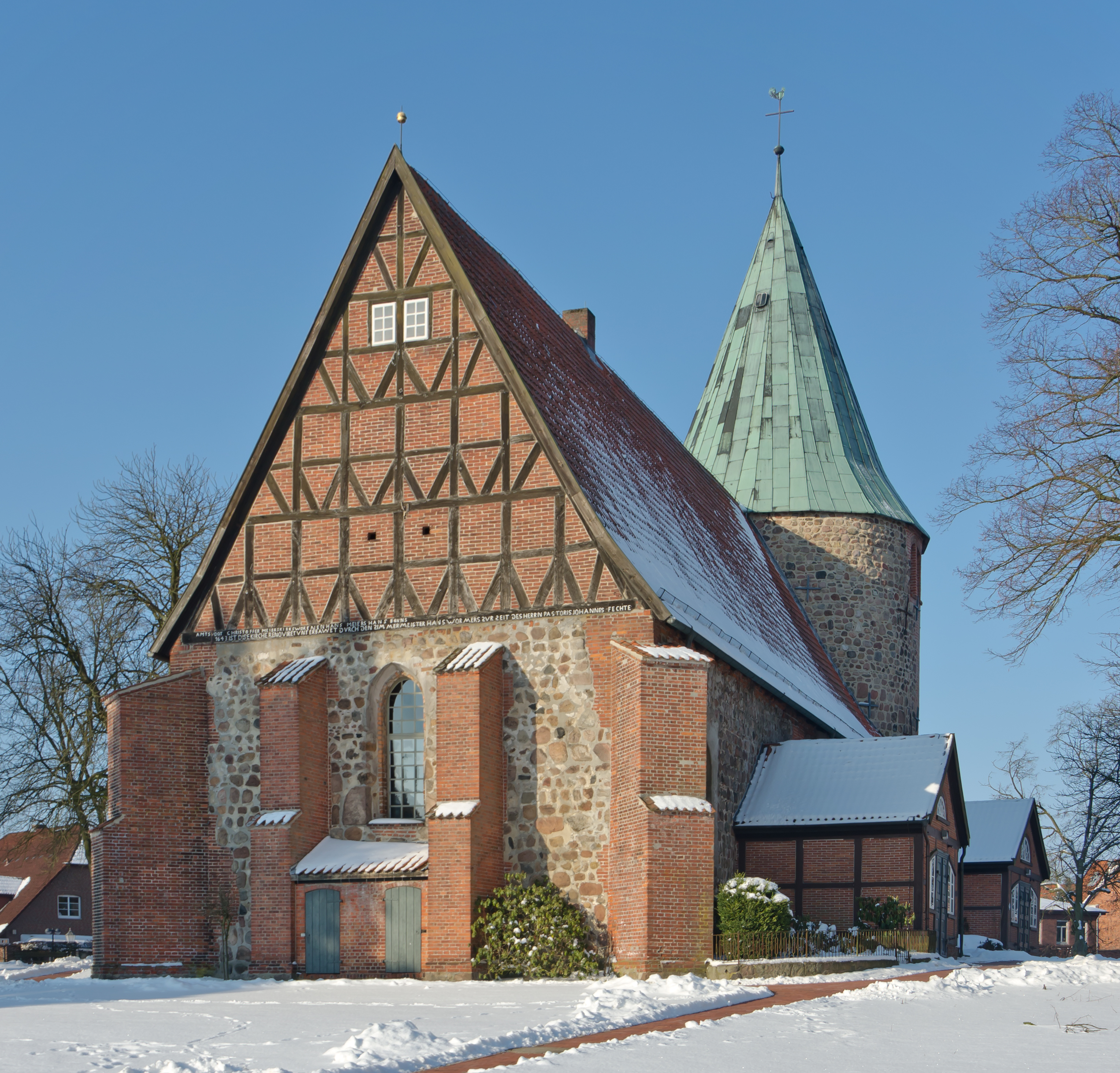
- Church of Saint John the Baptist

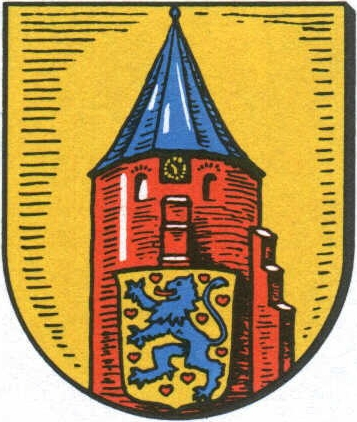
- Coat of arms

- Location of Salzhausen within Harburg district
- Interactive map of Salzhausen
- Location within Germany Location within Lower Saxony
- Coordinates: 53°13′N 10°10′E
- Country: Germany
- State: Lower Saxony
- District: Harburg
- Municipal assoc.: Salzhausen
- Subdivisions: 3

Government
  - Mayor: Elisabeth Mestmacher

Area
  - Total: 34.72 km^{2} (13.41 sq mi)
- Elevation: 27 m (89 ft)

Population (2025-12-31)
  - Total: 4,914
  - Density: 141.5/km^{2} (366.6/sq mi)
- Time zone: UTC+01:00 (CET)
  - Summer (DST): UTC+02:00 (CEST)
- Postal codes: 21376
- Dialling codes: 04172
- Vehicle registration: WL
- Website: www.salzhausen.de

Salzhausen is a municipality in the district of Harburg, in Lower Saxony, Germany. It is situated approximately 40 km southeast of Hamburg, and 15 km west of Lüneburg.

Salzhausen is also the seat of the Samtgemeinde ("collective municipality") Salzhausen.
