= Salzhausen (Samtgemeinde) =

Samtgemeinde in Lower Saxony, Germany

- Samtgemeinde
- Location of Salzhausen within Harburg district
- Interactive map of Salzhausen
- Location within Germany Location within Lower Saxony
- Coordinates: 53°14′N 10°10′E
- Country: Germany
- State: Lower Saxony
- District: Harburg
- Seat: Salzhausen
- Subdivisions: 8 municipalities

Area
  - Total: 148.96 km^{2} (57.51 sq mi)

Population (2025-12-31)
  - Total: 14,612
  - Density: 98.093/km^{2} (254.06/sq mi)
- Time zone: UTC+01:00 (CET)
  - Summer (DST): UTC+02:00 (CEST)
- Website: www.salzhausen.de

Salzhausen is a Samtgemeinde ("collective municipality") in the district of Harburg, in Lower Saxony, Germany. Its seat is in the village Salzhausen.

The Samtgemeinde Salzhausen consists of the following municipalities:

1. Eyendorf
2. Garlstorf
3. Garstedt
4. Gödenstorf
5. Salzhausen
6. Toppenstedt
7. Vierhöfen
8. Wulfsen
