= Elbmarsch =

Samtgemeinde in Lower Saxony, Germany

- Samtgemeinde
- Location of Elbmarsch within Harburg district
- Interactive map of Elbmarsch
- Location within Germany Location within Lower Saxony
- Coordinates: 53°25′N 10°23′E
- Country: Germany
- State: Lower Saxony
- District: Harburg
- Seat: Marschacht
- Subdivisions: 3 municipalities

Area
  - Total: 81.31 km^{2} (31.39 sq mi)

Population (2025-12-31)
  - Total: 13,036
  - Density: 160.3/km^{2} (415.2/sq mi)
- Time zone: UTC+01:00 (CET)
  - Summer (DST): UTC+02:00 (CEST)
- Website: www.samtgemeinde-elbmarsch.de

Elbmarsch (Northern Low Saxon: Elvmasch) is a Samtgemeinde ("collective municipality") in the district of Harburg, in Lower Saxony, Germany. It is situated on the southern (left) bank of the river Elbe, approx. 30 km southeast of Hamburg, and 20 km north of Lüneburg. Its seat is in the village Marschacht. The name refers to the marshes (German: Marsch) along the Elbe.

The Samtgemeinde Elbmarsch consists of the following municipalities:

1. Drage
2. Marschacht
3. Tespe

== Cancer cluster ==
Elbmarsch is the epicenter of a notable pediatric cancer cluster that persisted for over 15 years. Although a sparsely populated region a high rate of childhood leukemia was observed with an incidence in the region that is significantly higher compared to Germany as a whole. Ten more cases were identified than were expected throughout the period. No unique hazards have been identified. The community is surrounded by two nuclear establishments. A possible accidental release of radionuclides in 1986 was hypothesized.

Ionizing radiation is another exposure conclusively linked with childhood leukemia. Survivors (within 1000 m) of Hiroshima and Nagasaki developed leukemia 20 times more frequently than in unexposed populations.

The Krümmel Nuclear Power Plant began operations near Elbmarsch, Germany in 1983. Like Fallon, Nevada, the nearby population is quite small, including approximately 9,000 children within 10 km of the plant. Over a one and a half year period, six cases of leukemia and one case of aplastic anemia were identified among children in this area, a 41.5 increase over national incidence rates. Four more cases were diagnosed during a subsequent two-year period. Public health officials began to suspect that high levels of airborne tritium “might be involved either directly or as an indicator for earlier releases of other short-lived radionuclides”. Anti-nuclear activists believed it was due to the nuclear plant, which led to several investigations. The reported discovery of small spherical beads of nuclear material in the area led to further concern, as well as the presence of minute amounts of plutonium in the Elbe. The origins of the nuclear material were disputed, with one report determining them to not be that of the Krümmel plant. Another report claimed that they may have come from an undisclosed fire in 1986, however this theory has been questioned as it would have required a substantial government coverup. The Chernobyl disaster has also been suggested as a source, though is considered unlikely. The probable source of the material, especially in the Elbe, is nuclear reprocessing plants in France. A 2010 report exonerated the nuclear power plants on the Elbe as the cause of contamination. Further doubt was cast on the nature of the supposed beads of nuclear material, with a Federal commission chastising the original commission that claimed to have discovered the beads. The exact cause of the increased leukemia cases remains unknown, and could be due to other environmental factors, or even by chance.

The community surrounding the Savannah River nuclear facility in the U.S. was chosen for comparison with the “cluster” noted around the Kruemmel site. The tritium burden around the Savannah River site is significantly higher than the measured burden in Germany; however, the incidence of leukemia in South Carolina was not increased. Differences in population density, proximity to the power plant, and route of tritium exposure (inhalational versus oral via drinking water) may account for the lack of correlation between the two sites, or there may be alternative explanations for the increased incidence of hematopoietic malignancy between 1989 and 1991 in Elbmarsch.

Some of these alternative hypotheses have included electromagnetic fields, parental radiation exposure prior to conception, other carcinogens, and benzene exposure; however, none have been supported by the existing evidence. Intriguingly, a larger case-control study in Lower Saxony found a correlation between the “untrained immune system” (as judged as contact with other children, vaccinations, etc.) and leukemia risk, suggested that an immature immune system that has not been challenged is at greater risk for developing malignancy, possibly secondary to an undefined environment insult.
