= Egestorf =

- Municipality
- Coat of arms

- Location of Egestorf within Harburg district
- Interactive map of Egestorf
- Location within Germany Location within Lower Saxony
- Coordinates: 53°11′N 10°04′E
- Country: Germany
- State: Lower Saxony
- District: Harburg
- Municipal assoc.: Hanstedt
- Subdivisions: 5

Government
  - Mayor: Marko Schreiber

Area
  - Total: 48.83 km^{2} (18.85 sq mi)
- Elevation: 83 m (272 ft)

Population (2025-12-31)
  - Total: 2,674
  - Density: 54.76/km^{2} (141.8/sq mi)
- Time zone: UTC+01:00 (CET)
  - Summer (DST): UTC+02:00 (CEST)
- Postal codes: 21272
- Dialling codes: 04175
- Vehicle registration: WL

Egestorf (German pronunciation: [ˈeːɡəsˌtɔʁf]) is a municipality in the district of Harburg, in Lower Saxony, Germany.
