= Hanstedt =

- Municipality
- Coat of arms

- Location of Hanstedt within Harburg district
- Interactive map of Hanstedt
- Location within Germany Location within Lower Saxony
- Coordinates: 53°16′N 10°01′E
- Country: Germany
- State: Lower Saxony
- District: Harburg
- Municipal assoc.: Hanstedt
- Subdivisions: 4

Government
  - Mayor: Olaf Muus

Area
  - Total: 59.3 km^{2} (22.9 sq mi)
- Elevation: 45 m (148 ft)

Population (2025-12-31)
  - Total: 6,320
  - Density: 107/km^{2} (276/sq mi)
- Time zone: UTC+01:00 (CET)
  - Summer (DST): UTC+02:00 (CEST)
- Postal codes: 21271
- Dialling codes: 04184
- Vehicle registration: WL

Hanstedt is a municipality in the district of Harburg, in Lower Saxony, Germany. It is situated approximately 35 km south of Hamburg, and 25 km west of Lüneburg.

Hanstedt is also the seat of the Samtgemeinde ("collective municipality") Hanstedt.
