= Marschacht =

- Municipality
- Coat of arms

- Location of Marschacht within Harburg district
- Interactive map of Marschacht
- Location within Germany Location within Lower Saxony
- Coordinates: 53°25′01″N 10°22′07″E
- Country: Germany
- State: Lower Saxony
- District: Harburg
- Municipal assoc.: Elbmarsch
- Subdivisions: 5

Government
  - Mayor: Claus Eckermann (SPD)

Area
  - Total: 26.12 km^{2} (10.08 sq mi)
- Elevation: 8 m (26 ft)

Population (2025-12-31)
  - Total: 3,909
  - Density: 149.7/km^{2} (387.6/sq mi)
- Time zone: UTC+01:00 (CET)
  - Summer (DST): UTC+02:00 (CEST)
- Postal codes: 21436
- Dialling codes: 04176
- Vehicle registration: WL

Marschacht is a municipality in the district of Harburg, in Lower Saxony, Germany. It completes the Samtgemeinde Elbmarsch with Tespe and Drage. Marschacht is only a few kilometres far away from Geesthacht. 1216: First documentary mention of the settlement as Hachede, then a part of Saxony. A change in the course of the Elbe cuts the settlement into two: Geesthacht (in Schleswig-Holstein) and Marschacht .
