= Harburg (district) =

District in Lower Saxony, Germany

Coordinates: 53°20′N 10°05′E

- District
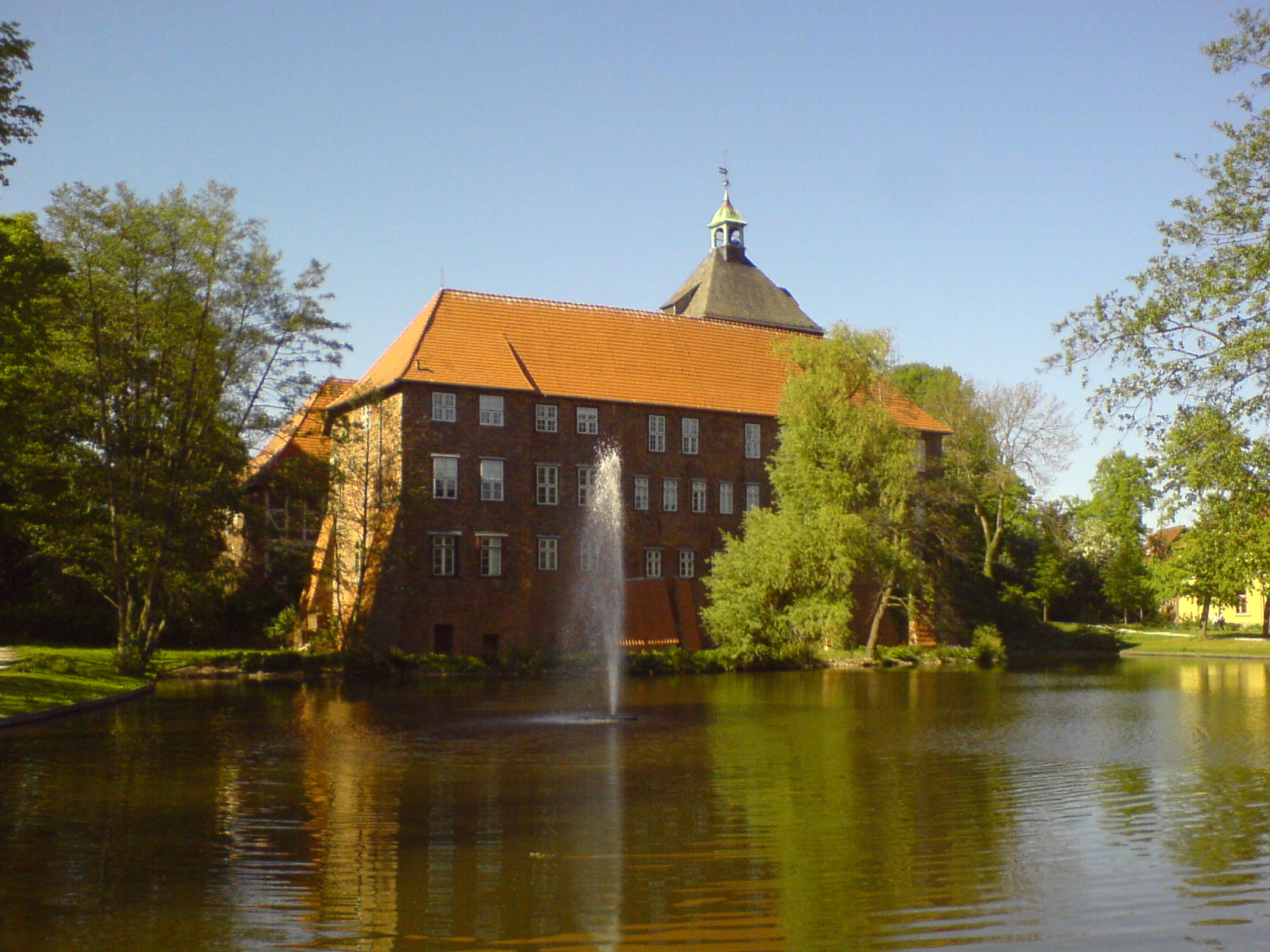

- Flag Coat of arms
- Country: Germany
- State: Lower Saxony
- Capital: Winsen (Luhe)

Government
  - District admin.: Rainer Rempe (CDU)

Area
  - Total: 1,245 km^{2} (481 sq mi)

Population (31 December 2024)
  - Total: 265,864
  - Density: 213.5/km^{2} (553.1/sq mi)
- Time zone: UTC+01:00 (CET)
  - Summer (DST): UTC+02:00 (CEST)
- Vehicle registration: WL
- Website: www.landkreis-harburg.de

District Harburg is a district (Landkreis) in Lower Saxony, Germany. It takes its name from the town of Harburg upon Elbe, which used to be the capital of the district but is now part of Hamburg and therefore no longer within the district. It is bounded by (from the east and clockwise) the districts of Lüneburg, Heidekreis, Rotenburg (Wümme) and Stade, by the City of Hamburg and the State of Schleswig-Holstein (District of Lauenburg).

== History ==
In 1885 the Prussian government established three districts in this region: the District of Harburg, the District of Winsen and the district-free City of Harburg upon Elbe. In 1932 the districts of Winsen and Harburg were merged; the City of Harburg-Wilhelmsburg (which had been merged in 1927) became the capital of the district, although it remained district-free and hence was not a part of the district.

In 1937 the City of Harburg-Wilhelmsburg was incorporated into the City of Hamburg with the Greater Hamburg Act. Harburg and Wilhelmsburg became two boroughs of Hamburg. The District of Harburg remained with the State of Prussia and retained its autonomy. Winsen upon Luhe became the new capital of the District in 1944.

== Geography ==
The District is located south of Hamburg and includes several suburbs of the Hamburg metropolitan area. In the south of the district part of the Lüneburg Heath (Lüneburger Heide) is found.

== Coat of arms ==
The lion was the heraldic animal of the Welfen family and the Duchy of Brunswick-Lüneburg, to which the region belonged before it became part of Prussia. The key is from the arms of the Prince-Archbishopric of Bremen, to which western parts of the district belonged earlier.

== Cities and municipalities ==
Clickable map of towns and municipalities in the district

Cities	Samtgemeinden
1. Buchholz in der Nordheide; 2. Winsen (Luhe); Free municipalities: 1. Neu Wulmstorf; 2. Rosengarten; 3. Seevetal; 4. Stelle	1. Elbmarsch; 1. Drage; 2. Marschacht^{1}; 3. Tespe; 2. Hanstedt; 1. Asendorf; 2. Brackel; 3. Egestorf; 4. Hanstedt^{1}; 5. Marxen; 6. Undeloh	3. Hollenstedt; 1. Appel; 2. Drestedt; 3. Halvesbostel; 4. Hollenstedt^{1}; 5. Moisburg; 6. Regesbostel; 7. Wenzendorf; 4. Jesteburg; 1. Bendestorf; 2. Harmstorf; 3. Jesteburg^{1}	5. Salzhausen; 1. Eyendorf; 2. Garlstorf; 3. Garstedt; 4. Gödenstorf; 5. Salzhausen^{1}; 6. Toppenstedt; 7. Vierhöfen; 8. Wulfsen; 6. Tostedt; 1. Dohren; 2. Handeloh; 3. Heidenau; 4. Kakenstorf; 5. Königsmoor; 6. Otter; 7. Tostedt^{1}; 8. Welle; 9. Wistedt
	^{1}seat of the Samtgemeinde
