= Maschen Marshalling Yard =

Railway marshalling yard in Lower Saxony

Maschen Marshalling Yard Maschen Rangierbahnhof
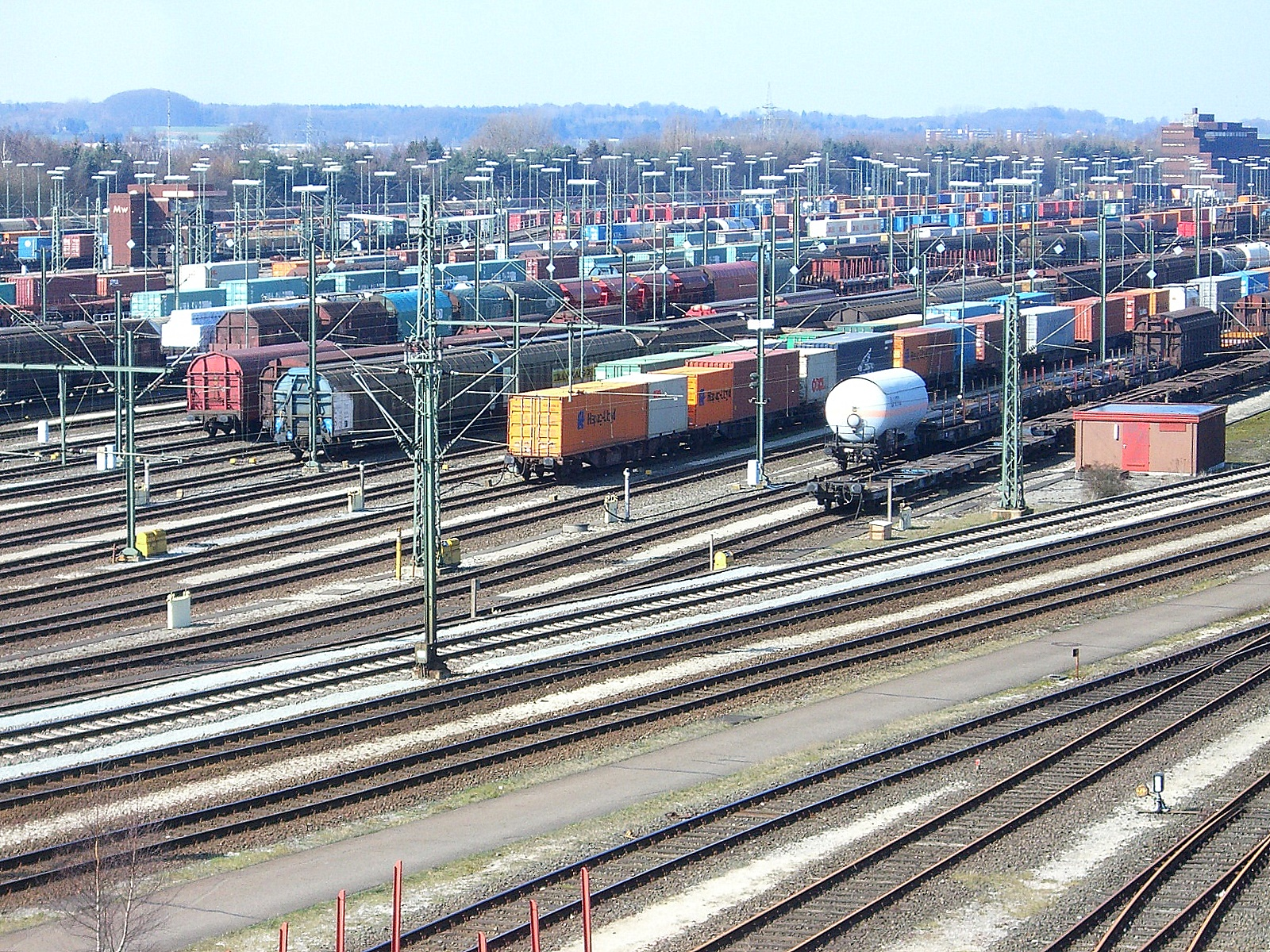
- Maschen Rbf: the north-south system

General information
- Location: Seevetal; Maschen, Lower Saxony; Germany
- Coordinates: 53°24′17″N 10°03′23″E
- System: Railway classification (hump yard) and repair facilities

Construction
- Structure type: at-grade

Other information
- Station code: AM
Location
- Location within Lower Saxony Location within Germany

Maschen Marshalling Yard (German: Maschen Rangierbahnhof, abbreviated to Maschen Rbf or AM in the official railway directory) near Maschen south of Hamburg on the Hanover–Hamburg railway in Germany is the largest marshalling yard in Europe, its size only being exceeded worldwide by the Bailey Yard in the US state of Nebraska.

== Layout and duties ==
The marshalling yard takes up an area of 280 hectares (692 acres), has a length of 7,000 metres (4.3 miles) and a maximum width of 700 metres (2,300 feet). When it opened it had a total track length of 300 kilometres (186 miles) and there were six signal boxes, 825 sets of points, 100 home, 115 distant and 688 shunting signals. As a two-sided shunting facility, Maschen has two train formation yards. The north–south system originally had a set of 48 departure sidings and a set of 16 reception sidings; the south–north system consisted of a set of 64 departure sidings and a set of 17 reception sidings. Both systems are supplemented by storage and marshalling sidings. In addition, there is an eight-road main repair shop for the repair of goods wagons and an engine shed for the maintenance of electric and diesel-driven goods train locomotives with a two-road inspection hall and numerous open-air storage sidings. Four signal boxes are responsible for the yard, two for each system. Two small signal boxes that had been built for the marshalling sidings were closed again in 1983.

In 2002 a central relief yard (Dispostelle) replaced the previous two yards—one for each direction. In 2004 the goods wagon repair shop was upgraded into a combined shop (Kombiwerk), and is now responsible for the maintenance of locomotives as well as wagons.

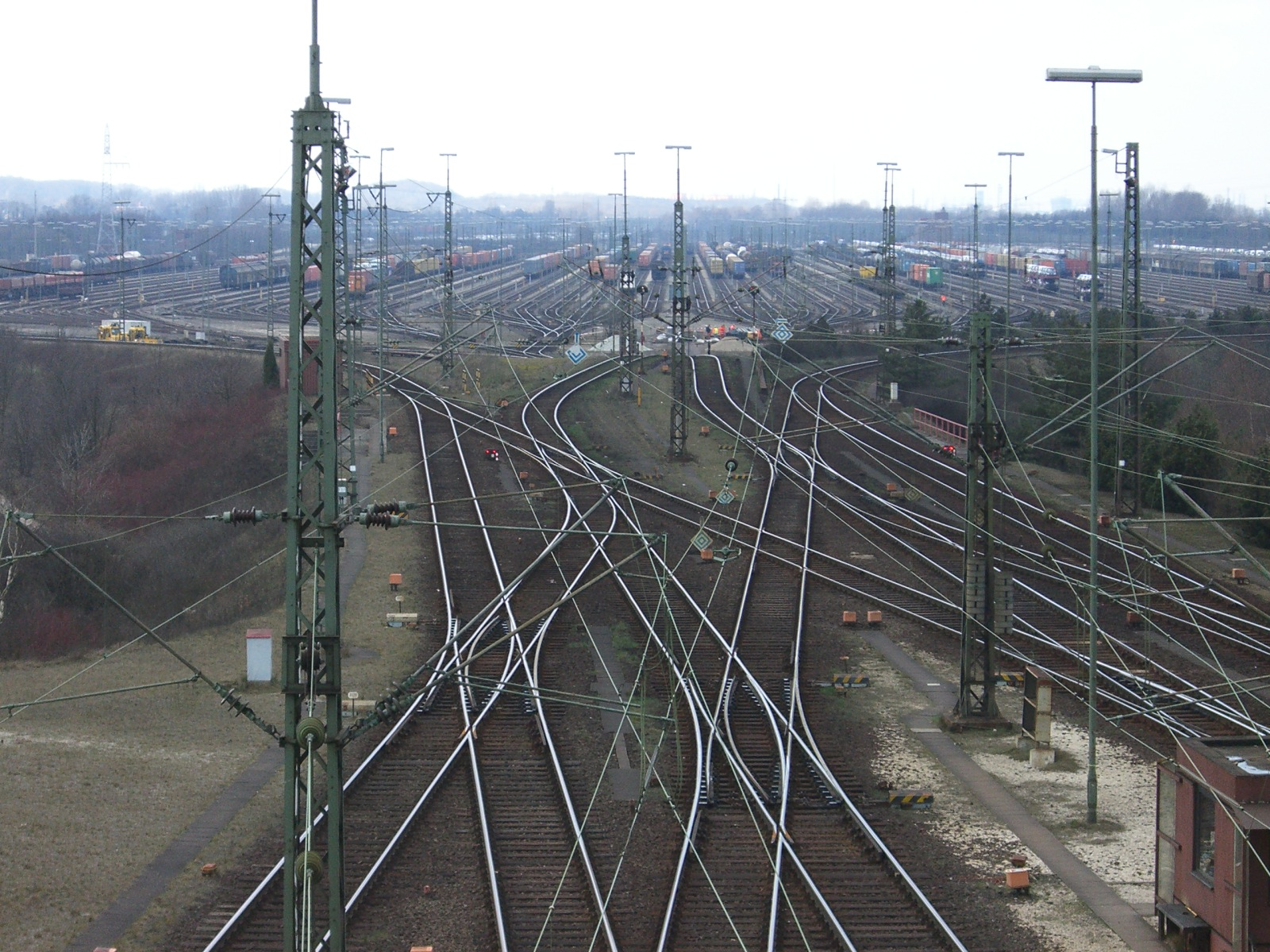
The south–north set of 64 departure sidings

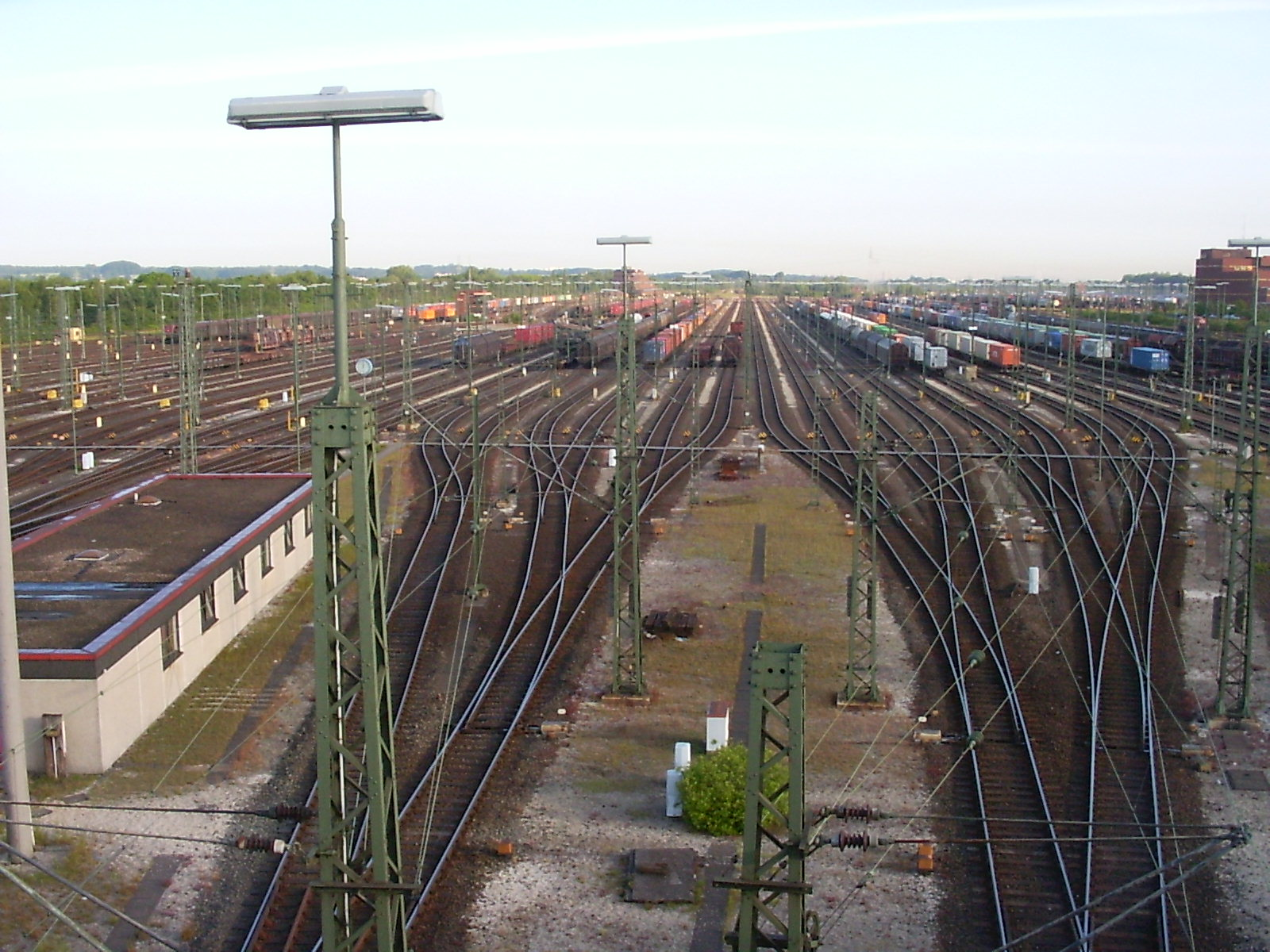
The north–south set of 48 departure sidings

In order to achieve the aspiration for a capacity of 11,000 goods wagons per day, Maschen was equipped from the beginning with the most modern shunting technology available in the 1970s. The composition of incoming goods trains was transmitted to Maschen before they arrived, so that the hitherto usual practice of handing over the trains in the reception sidings could be done away with. Using the data, train-splitting lists were created, these formed the working basis for the sequence control unit (Ablaufsteuerrechner or ASR). The ASR controls the shunters on the hump yards by radio, giving them the shunting speeds, setting the points for the rolling goods wagons and regulating their speed with retarders, 26 bar-type (Balkengleisbremsen) and 112 rubber retarders being available. 112 wagon transporters (Beidrückanlagen) move the loose wagons onwards within the sidings.

Maschen Marshalling Yard is responsible for the formation of both regional, national and also international goods trains. Importantly, it also acts as a hub for the transportation of export goods to, and imported goods from, the ports of Hamburg and Bremerhaven, as well as traffic to and from Scandinavia. Currently shunting operations are carried out by DB Cargo, Cargo Zentrum Hamburg.

From 1977 to 2007 around 1.18 million trains with a total of 35.5 million wagons were assembled and dispatched from Maschen Marshalling Yard. In the 1980s 75 trains per day were formed in the north–south system and 125 in the south–north system. The highest number of wagons dispatched was 8,400 on 11 December 1985. At the beginning of the 1990s the figure was about 8,000; in 2009 it was 4,000 goods wagons. So Maschen has so far not reached the upper planning limit of 11,000 goods wagons per day; one of the reasons is that in the last 40 years there has been a considerable increase in the length of freight wagons.

== Outlook ==
Because the 30-year-old facilities were in need of renovation, in 2009 work started on replacing and partially converting the yard. This will also take account of the increasing significance of container traffic from the ports. In the course of renovation a secondary hump with shorter sorting and formation sidings (Nachordnungsgleisen) will be given up in favour of longer sorting sidings for the formation of long-distance trains. Reception and sorting sidings and their associated points will be replaced in sets and the hump technology will be upgraded to the latest state of the art as part of the renovation work on the whole yard. A total of 220 million euros is being invested in this work which should be completed by 2014.

== Sources ==
- Deutsche Bundesbahn, Bundesbahndirektion Hamburg (ed.): Der Rangierbahnhof Maschen. Stalling, Oldenburg (Oldb.) 1975, no ISBN.
- Wolfgang Klee: Eisenbahnen in Hamburg. Eisenbahn Journal special 5/97.
- Railion Deutschland AG (today DB Schenker Rail Deutschland), Cargo Zentrum Hamburg-Maschen, Planung, Hesse, December 2007.
- Benno Wiesmüller, Dierk Lawrenz: Die Hamburger Rangier- und Güterbahnhöfe. EK-Verlag, Freiburg 2009, ISBN 978-3-88255-303-1.
