= Inge Meysel =

German actress

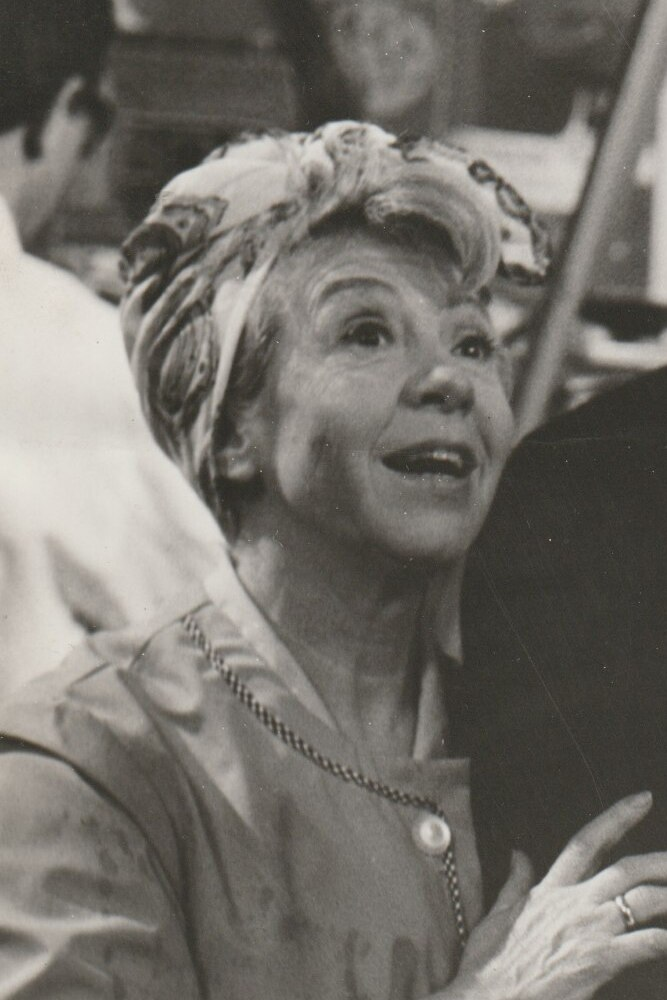
- Inge Meysel, 1964
- Born: Ingeborg Charlotte Hansen; 30 May 1910; Rixdorf (now Neukölln), German Empire
- Died: 10 July 2004 (aged 94); Seevetal, Lower Saxony, Germany

Signature
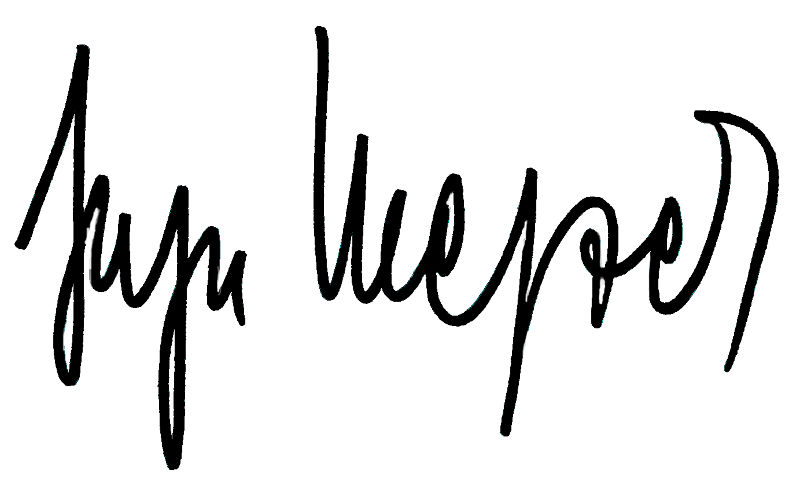

Inge Meysel (German: [ˈɪŋə ˈmaɪzl̩]; 30 May 1910 – 10 July 2004) was a German actress. From the early 1960s until her death, Meysel was one of Germany's most popular actresses. She had a successful stage career and played more than 100 roles in film and on television.

== Life and work ==
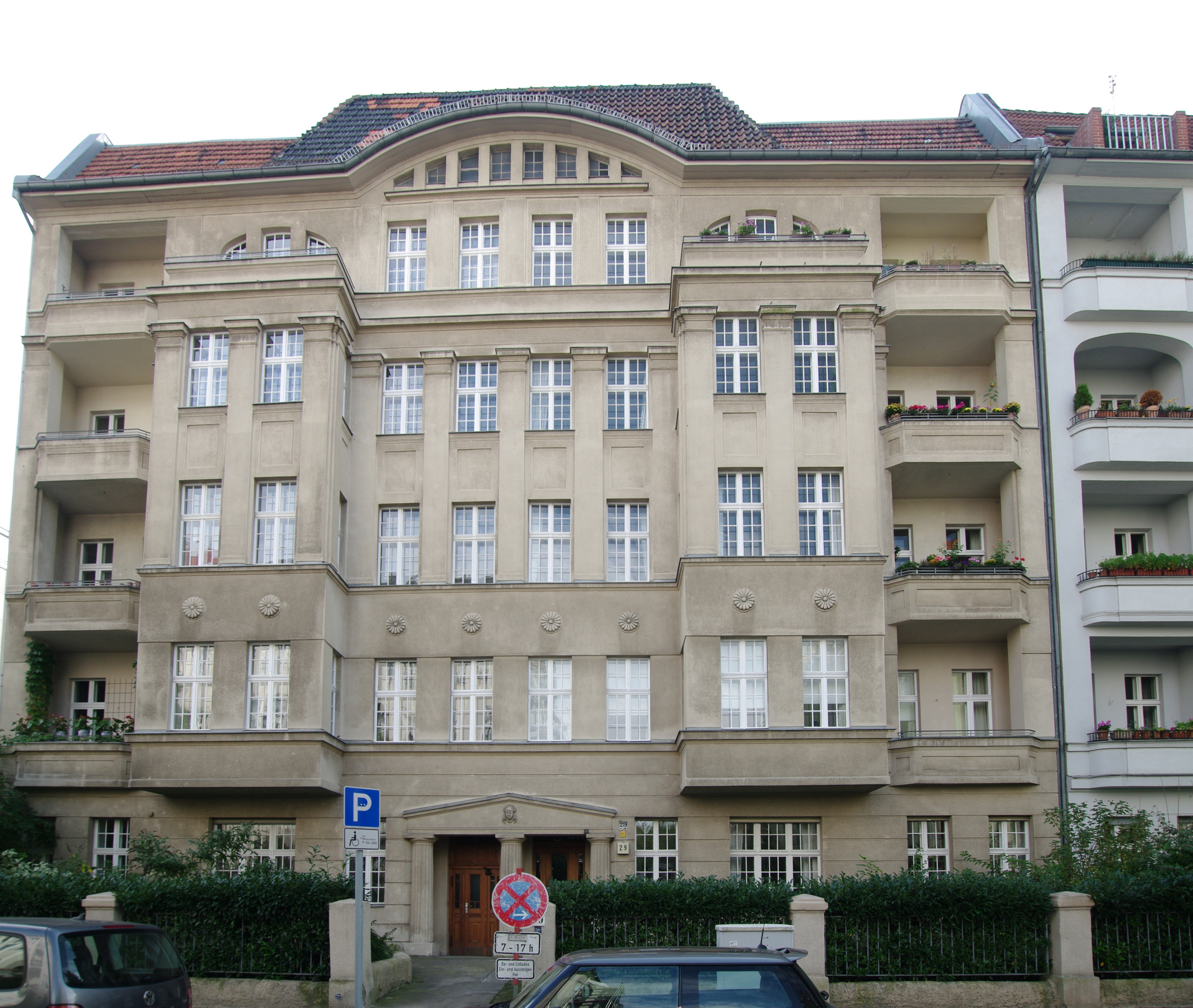
Home in Berlin-Schöneberg until 1999

Born Ingeborg Charlotte Hansen, the daughter of Anna Hansen, who was Danish, and Julius Meysel, a German Jew. She attended drama schools in Berlin from 1928 until 1930, thereafter she was on stage in Zwickau, Leipzig and Berlin.

During Nazi Germany, Meysel was banned from performing from 1935 until 1945 because of her Jewish father. In 1945 she restarted her career in Hamburg.

Since the early 1960s Inge Meysel mainly acted in made-for-TV films and got the nickname (Fernseh-) Mutter der Nation ("(Television) Mother of the Nation").

She won numerous German actor awards including a lifetime achievement award from the German Television Awards, but in 1981 she refused to accept the Bundesverdienstkreuz because "Einen Orden dafür, daß man anständig gelebt hat, brauche ich nicht" ("I don't need an order of merit just for having lived decently").

From the mid-1920s until shortly before her death, Meysel was outspoken on many – often controversial – social and political issues. Despite her decidedly leftist and feminist views, this did not harm her popularity as an actress. In 1992, she came out as bisexual.

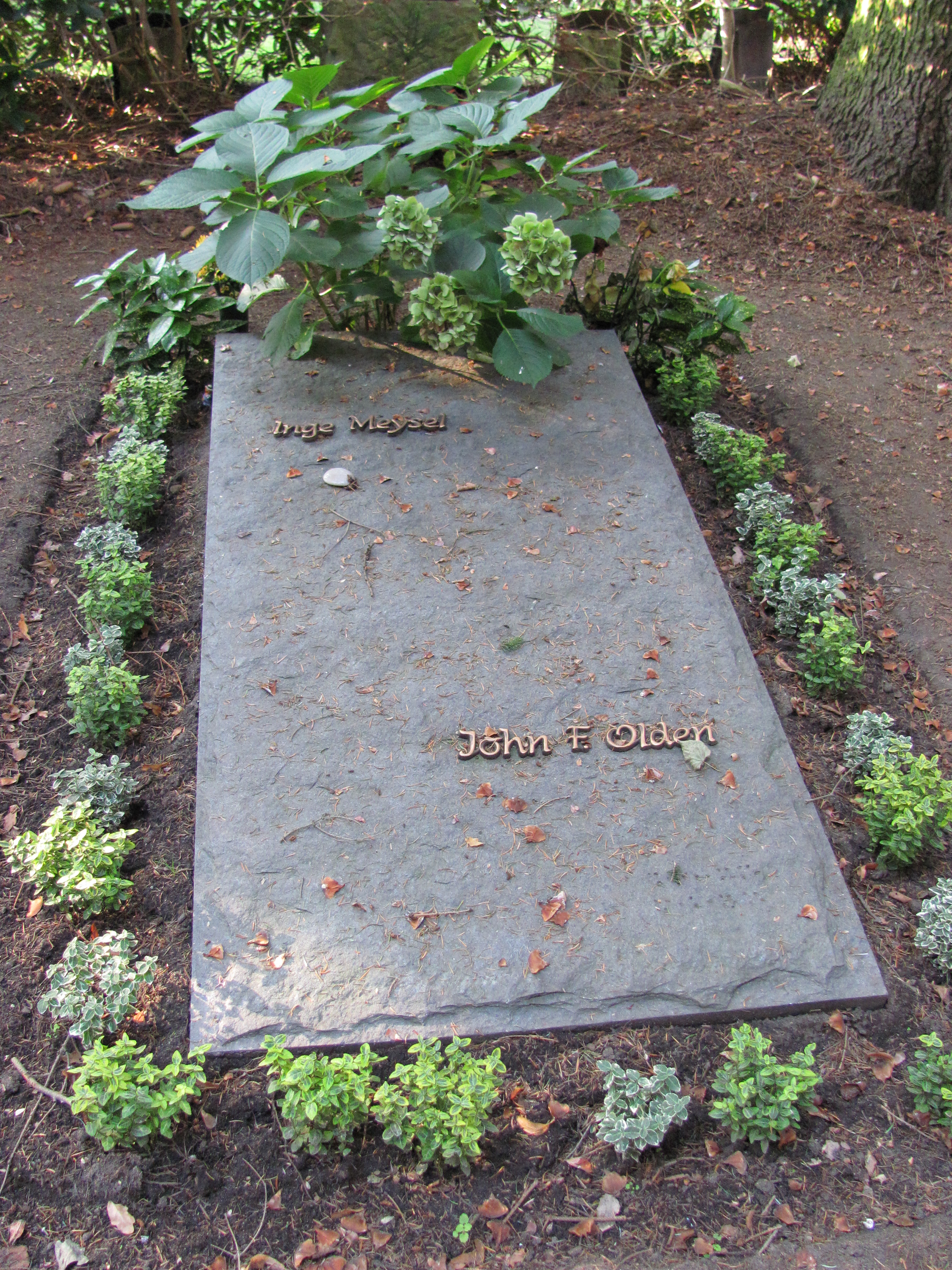
Grave of Inge Meysel in Friedhof Ohlsdorf (2011)

In 2004, aged 94, she died of heart failure at her home in Bullenhausen near Hamburg. She was cremated and her ashes were buried near her second husband the Austrian film producer John Olden (1918–1965) at Ohlsdorf Main Cemetery, Hamburg.

== Selected filmography ==
=== Television ===
- Die Wäscherin des Herrn Bonaparte (1954, based on Madame Sans-Gêne), as Catherine Hübscher
- Im sechsten Stock (TV series, 3 episodes, 1954–55), as Germaine Lescalier
- Die Heiratsvermittlerin (1955, based on The Matchmaker), as Dolly Levi
- Ein Mann für Jenny (1956, based on The Reluctant Debutante), as Sheila Broadbent
- Kabale und Liebe (1959, based on Intrigue and Love), as Miller's wife
- Im sechsten Stock (TV series, 3 episodes, 1959), as Germaine Lescalier (remake of the 1954/55 TV series)
- Die Zeit und die Conways (1960, based on Time and the Conways), as Mrs. Conway
- Das Fenster zum Flur (1960), as Anni Wiesner
- Madame Sans-Gêne (1960, based on Madame Sans-Gêne), as Catherine Hübscher (remake of Die Wäscherin des Herrn Bonaparte)
- Schau heimwärts, Engel (1961, based on Look Homeward, Angel), as Eliza Gant
- The Beaver Coat (1962, based on The Beaver Coat), as Mother Wolff
- The Conflagration (1962, based on The Conflagration), as Mrs. Fielitz
- Stadtpark (1963), as Anna Thielecke
- Wachet und singet (1964, based on Awake and Sing!), as Bessie Berger
- Die Unverbesserlichen (TV series, 7 episodes, 1965–71), as Käthe Scholz
- Gertrud Stranitzki (TV series, 13 episodes, 1966–68), as Gertrud Stranitzki
- The Rats (1969, based on The Rats), as Mrs. John
- Ida Rogalski (TV series, 13 episodes, 1969–70), as Ida Rogalski
- So war Mama (1969, based on I Remember Mama), as Mama
- Weh' dem, der erbt (1969, based on the Mrs Thursday series), as Alice Thursday
- Keiner erbt für sich allein (1970, based on the Mrs Thursday series), as Alice Thursday
- Kinderheim Sasener Chaussee (TV series, 6 episodes, 1973), as Irene König
- Eine geschiedene Frau (TV miniseries, 6 episodes, 1974), as Erika Seipold
- Endstation Paradies (1977), as Fränze Riedel
- Ihr 106. Geburtstag (1979), as Mamouret
- Bühne frei für Kolowitz (1980, based on Enter Laughing), as Emma Kolowitz
- Mrs. Harris (TV series, 6 episodes, 1982–91, based on the "Mrs. 'Arris" novels by Paul Gallico), as Ada Harris
- Derrick - Season 12, Episode 8: "Schwester Hilde" (1985), as Schwester Hilde
- Die Erbschaft (1987), as Wilhelmine Eisel
- The State Chancellery (1989)
- Polizeiruf 110: 1A Landeier (1995), as Elisabeth Kampnagel
- Die Liebenden vom Alexanderplatz (2001), as Ruth Levenstein
- Polizeiruf 110: Mein letzter Wille (2004), as Elisabeth Kampnagel (final film role)

=== Film ===
- Love '47 (1949)
- My Niece Susanne (1950)
- Taxi-Kitty (1950)
- Shadows in the Night (1950)
- The Dubarry (1951)
- Sensation in San Remo (1951)
- Tanzende Sterne (1952)
- Under the Thousand Lanterns (1952)
- The Man of My Life (1954)
- Des Teufels General (1955)
- Uns gefällt die Welt (1956)
- Doctor Crippen Lives (1958)
- Nasser Asphalt (1958)
- Immer die Radfahrer (1958)
- The Girl from the Marsh Croft (1958)
- Als geheilt entlassen (1960)
- You Must Be Blonde on Capri (1961)
- Im sechsten Stock (1961), as Germaine Lescalier (Remake of the 1954/55 TV series)
- Her Most Beautiful Day (1962), as Anni Wiesner (Remake of the TV film Das Fenster zum Flur)
- Ein Frauenarzt klagt an (1964), as Oberschwester Gertrud
- Der rote Strumpf (1981), as Maria Panacek
