= Ramelsloh =

- Ortsteil of Seevetal
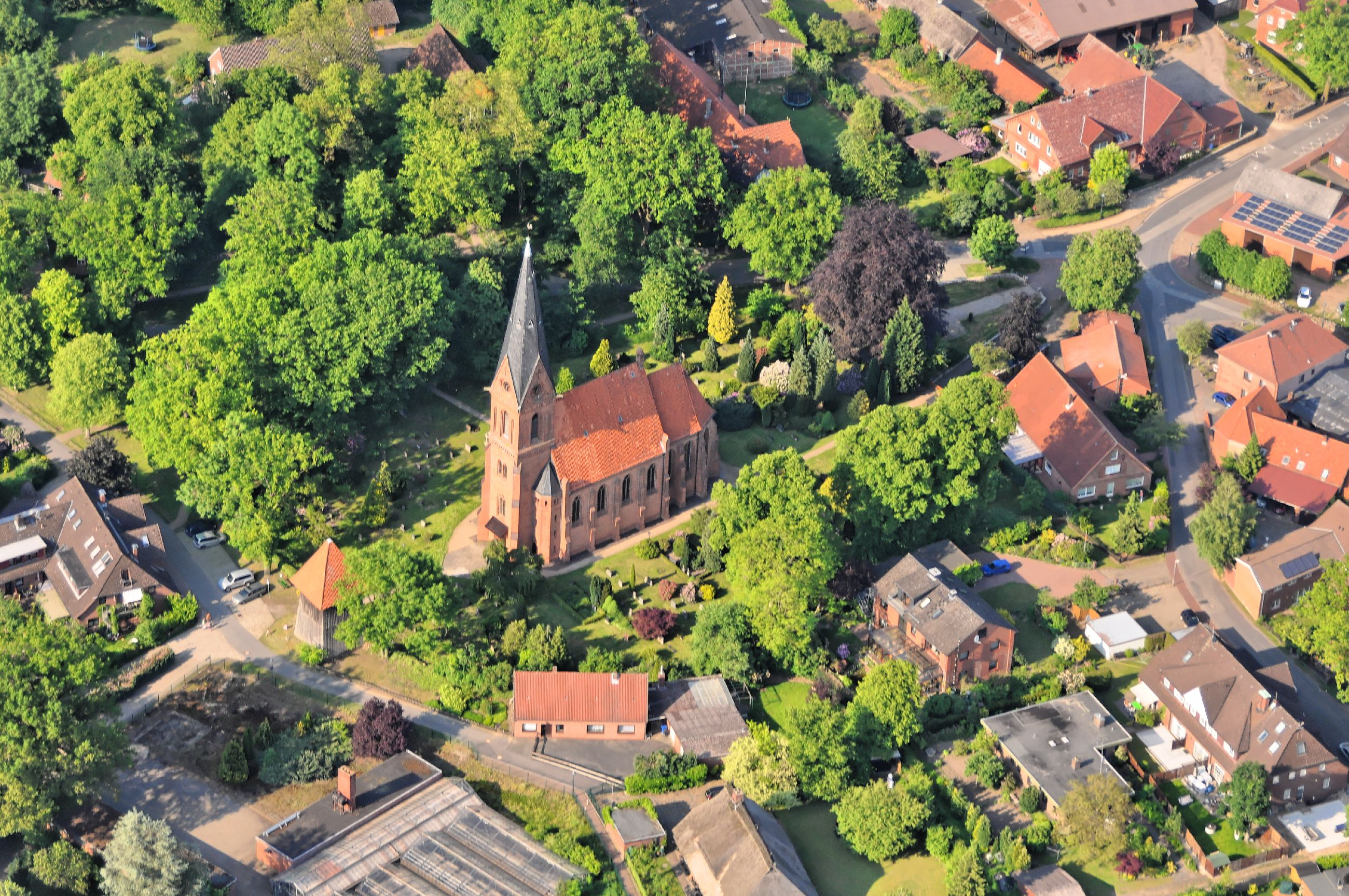
- Ramelsloh

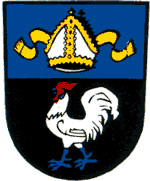
- Coat of arms

- Location of Ramelsloh within Harburg district
- Interactive map of Ramelsloh
- Location within Germany Location within Lower Saxony
- Coordinates: 53°20′31″N 10°01′31″E
- Country: Germany
- State: Lower Saxony
- District: Harburg
- Municipality: Seevetal
- Time zone: UTC+01:00 (CET)
  - Summer (DST): UTC+02:00 (CEST)

Ramelsloh (German pronunciation: [ˈʁaːml̩sˌloː]) is a village in the district of Harburg, in Lower Saxony, Germany. It is situated on a small river Seeve, 30 km south of Hamburg. There are approximately 1,600 people living within the village. Since July 1, 1972, Ramelsloh is a member of the municipality Seevetal.

Ramelsloh is known as the home of the annual Heiderock Festival, a music festival celebrating Irish and Scottish music and culture.
