= The Conflagration =

Play written by Gerhart Hauptmann

The Conflagration Der rote Hahn
- Original language: German
- Written by: Gerhart Hauptmann
- Setting: In the neighbourhood of Berlin, around 1901.

Premiere
- Date: 1901

The Conflagration (German: Der rote Hahn, 1901) is a German play written by Gerhart Hauptmann (1862–1946). Like Henrik Ibsen, Hauptmann focuses attention on social issues. Unlike The Weavers (1892) and The Assumption of Hannele (1893), it does not seem to have ever been performed on Broadway; however, it was adapted as a German film in 1962, directed by John Olden and starring Rudolf Platte as Schuhmachermeister Fielitz and Inge Meysel as Frau Fielitz.

== Characters ==
- Fielitz, cobbler
- Mrs. Fielitz, his wife
- Leontine, her oldest daughter by her first marriage
- Schmarowski, architect and son-in-law to the Fielitz'
- Langheinrich, smith
- Rauchhaupt, retired Prussian constable
- Gustav, his oldest son, congenital imbecile
- Mieze, Lottle, Trude, Lenchen,
- Lieschen, Mariechen, Tienchen, Hannchen, his daughters
- Dr. Boxer, physician of Jewish birth
- Von Wehrhahn, justice
- Ede, journeyman at Langheinrich's
- Glasenapp, clerk in the Justice's Court
- Schulze, constable
- Mrs. Schulze, his aunt
- Tschache, constable
- A fireman
- A boy
- Janitor of the Court
- Village people

== Plot ==
Setting: In the neighbourhood of Berlin, around 1901.

Fielitz, a cobbler, is arguing with his wife, who wants them to stop toiling for nothing. She suggests committing arson, setting fire to their house to obtain insurance money. Von Wehrhahn arrives, Mrs. Fielitz being formerly known as Wolff and his housekeeper. Neighbors arrive as well: Langheinrich, a smith, and Rauchhaupt, a retired constable. They make comments about the iron cross inscribed by Rauchhaupt on the grave of her former husband. Later, Langheinrich receives the visit of Dr Boxer, who has returned after being at sea for several years. Gustav, Rauchhaupt's mentally handicapped son, enters briskly, excited, making sounds from his mouth seeming like a trumpet. He drops a box of matches. There is a fire at the Fielitz house, Langheinrich being called as a voluntary fireman. The business is investigated by Wehrhahn, who concludes, contrary to his father's belief, that Gustav is guilty and must be sent away. Despite Rauchhaupt's suspicions, the Fielitz are never found out. They profit by it, together with their family, including their prosperous son-in-law to their daughter, Schmarowski, an architect. Nevertheless, the stress of the experience seems to have affected Fielitz' brain, Mrs Fielitz feels poorly, and just as Fielitz bursts in the room exclaiming: "Me ... me ... me ... me ... it was me that did it!", his wife wanders, her arms thrashing about, and dies.
