= Ovelgönne bread roll =

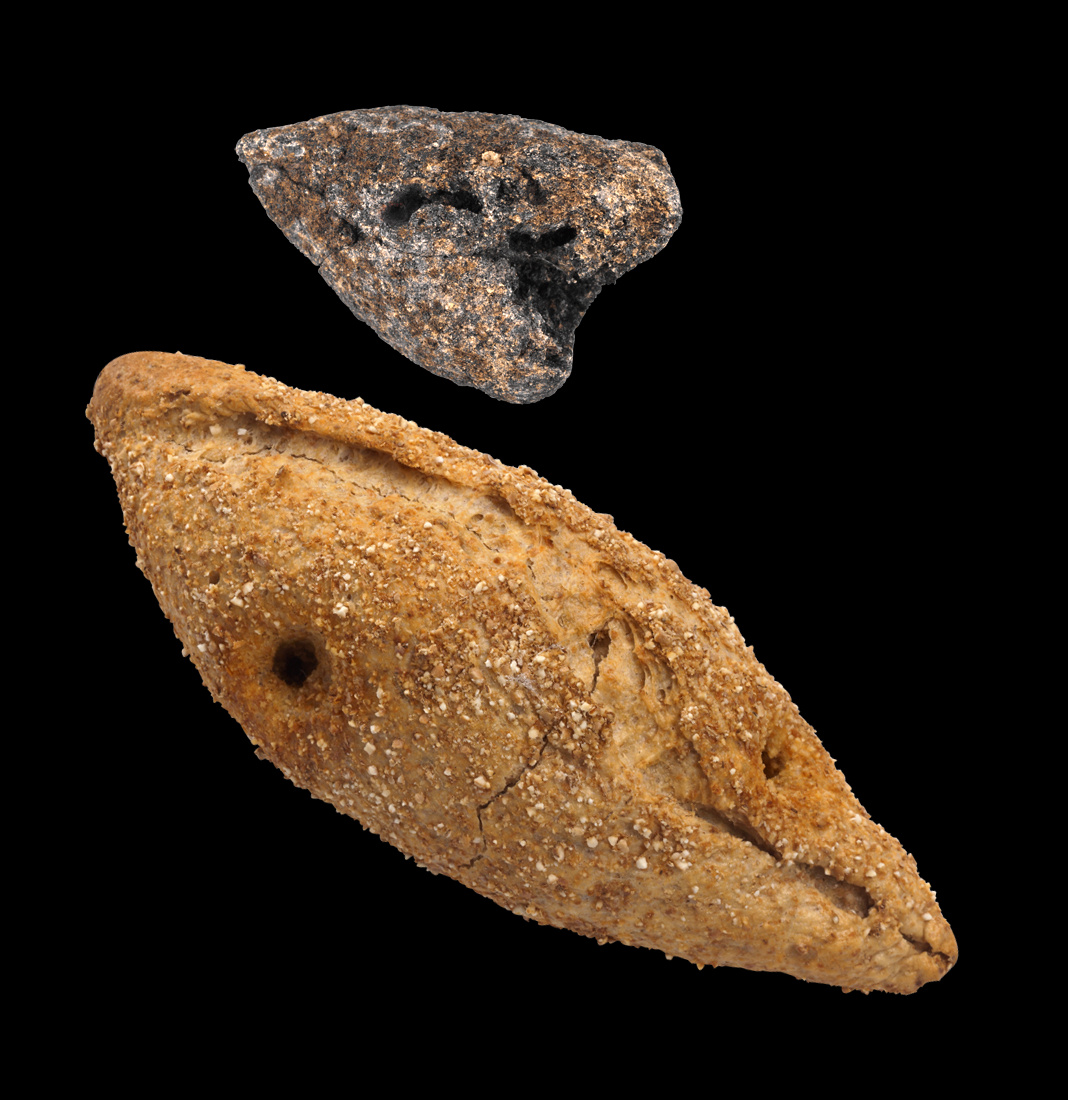
The Ovelgönne bread roll (top) with reconstruction (below)

The Ovelgönne bread roll is the remaining part of a bread roll originating from the Pre-Roman Iron Age of Northern Europe, which was found in 1952 during archaeological excavations in a loam mine in the Buxtehude district Ovelgönne in Lower Saxony, Germany. The piece of bread is the oldest surviving formed bakery product from Europe. The find, along with a reconstruction, are in the permanent exhibition of the Archaeological Museum Hamburg in Harburg, Hamburg.

== Location of find ==
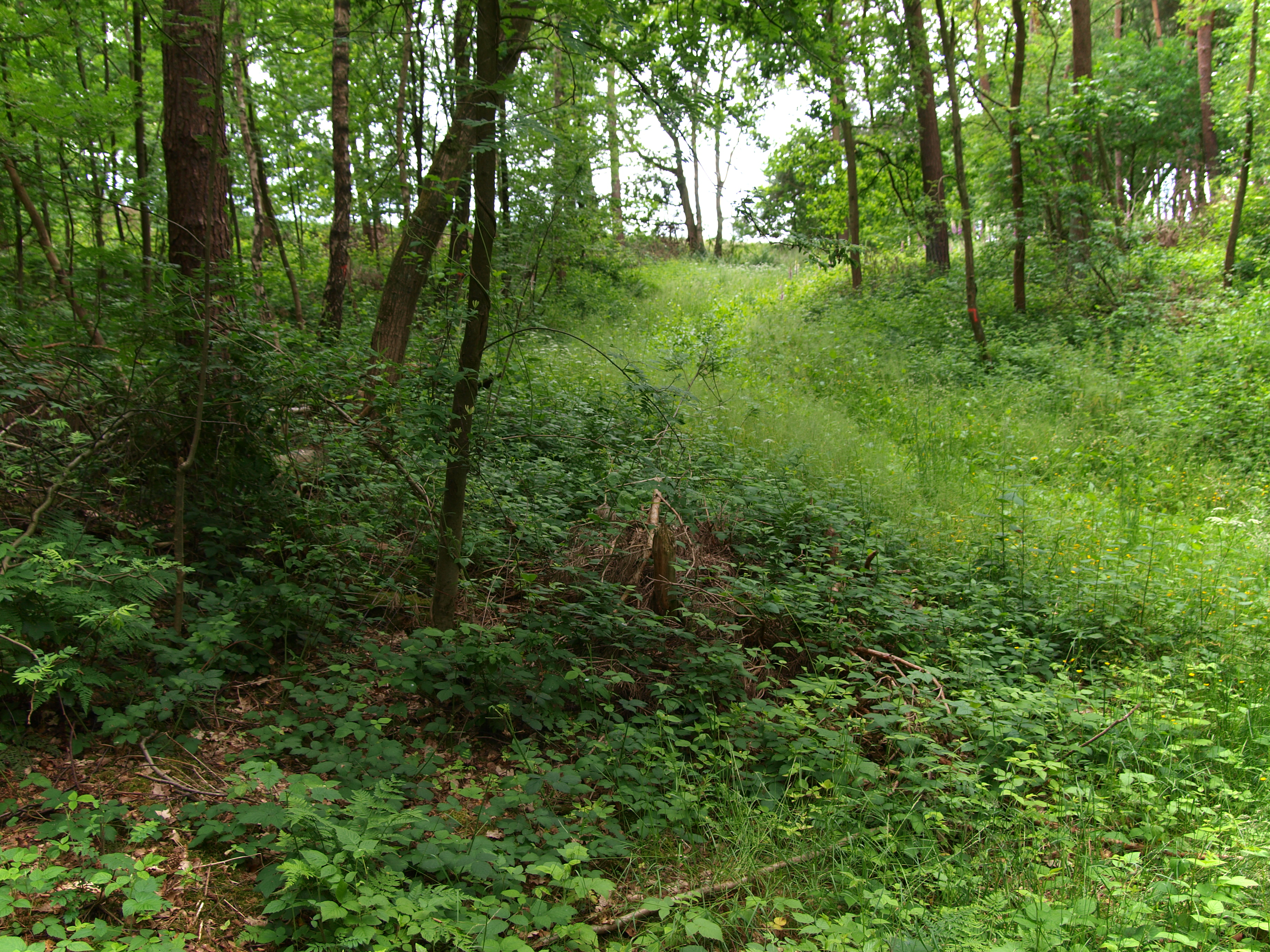
The location in June 2012

In May 1952 one of Helms-Museum’s staff, Willi Rühland, discovered a dark discoloration in a freshly cut clay wall on the north side of the municipal loam mine of Ovelgönne at 53.447161°N 9.739006°E. The irregular pit had a depth of 150 centimetres (59 in) and a width of 150 centimetres (59 in). The backfilling of the pit was irregularly mixed up with shards of pottery, pieces of charcoal, lumps of clay, and stones, suggesting an Iron Age rubbish pit. Half down the pit, the remains of the charred bread was found.

== Findings ==
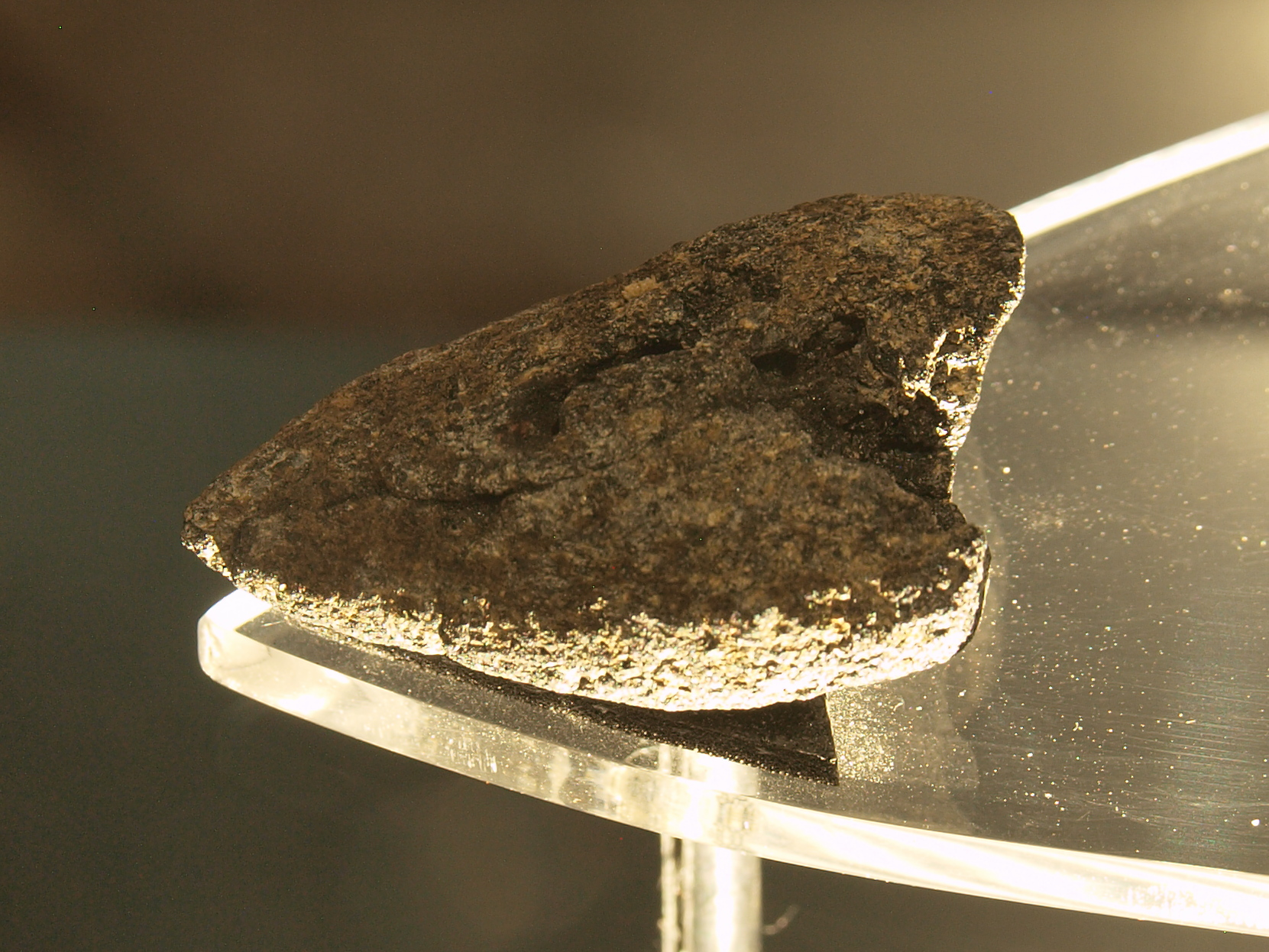
The surviving bread roll piece in the museum

The Ovelgönne bread roll originally had two tip-shaped ends. Due to its regular shape, it is categorized among the formed bakery products having a predefined shape. The strongly charred loaf of bread was aborted at about the half its length. The surviving part of the bread has a length of 35 millimetres (1.4 in), a width of 22.94 millimetres (0.903 in) and a height of 11.44 millimetres (0.450 in), having a weight of 2.5 grams (0.088 oz) only. The point of the remaining end is missing. The colour of the surface is pearl grey to slate grey, the underside is grey to black. The top of the roll has a fine and slightly curved incision, which is designed to prevent tearing during the baking process. Nearly in the center of the resulting surface on the top is a 2 millimetres (0.079 in) deep and 3.56 millimetres (0.140 in) × 2.80 millimetres (0.110 in) depression, which was pressed into it with a round tool at an angle of approximately 45°. A second hole was most likely also on the missing half of the loaf. The bread had no pronounced crust and it was baked from a very finely ground and sifted wheat flour. A microscopic examination of the surface showed that the dough contained only remarkable small traces of wear fine millstones. The dough itself was kneaded thoroughly and showed only very small porosity, suggesting that neither a wild yeast fermentation nor a sourdough were used to leaven the bread loaf. Possibly for lightening of the dough, egg white or fat was added. The baking process must have taken place in an oven on a stone surface which was good, but not completely cleaned of coal, as small charcoal remains have been reflected in the pores of the base. The bread was baked at an excessive top heat, compared to today's baking practice. Sandy deposits in the inner parts of the fracture surface indicates that the bread was broken apart before its discovery. A radiological examination performed in Bern (Switzerland) showed that the superficial incision widened inwards slightly. The radiological images also showed two, mysterious metal particles of 2.92 millimetres (0.115 in) × 1.7 millimetres (0.067 in) and 3.16 millimetres (0.124 in) × 2.92 millimetres (0.115 in), embedded in the dough.

From his investigation of numerous archaeological bread finds, Max Währen reconstructed the original size of the complete bread roll, considering a 15% shrinkage by the charring to estimate 70 millimetres (2.8 in) × 45.88 millimetres (1.806 in) × 22.48 millimetres (0.885 in).

Due to typological determination of the ceramic vessel shards found in the pit, the Ovelgönne bread roll was dated to the early Iron Age, around 800-500 B.C.

== Interpretation ==
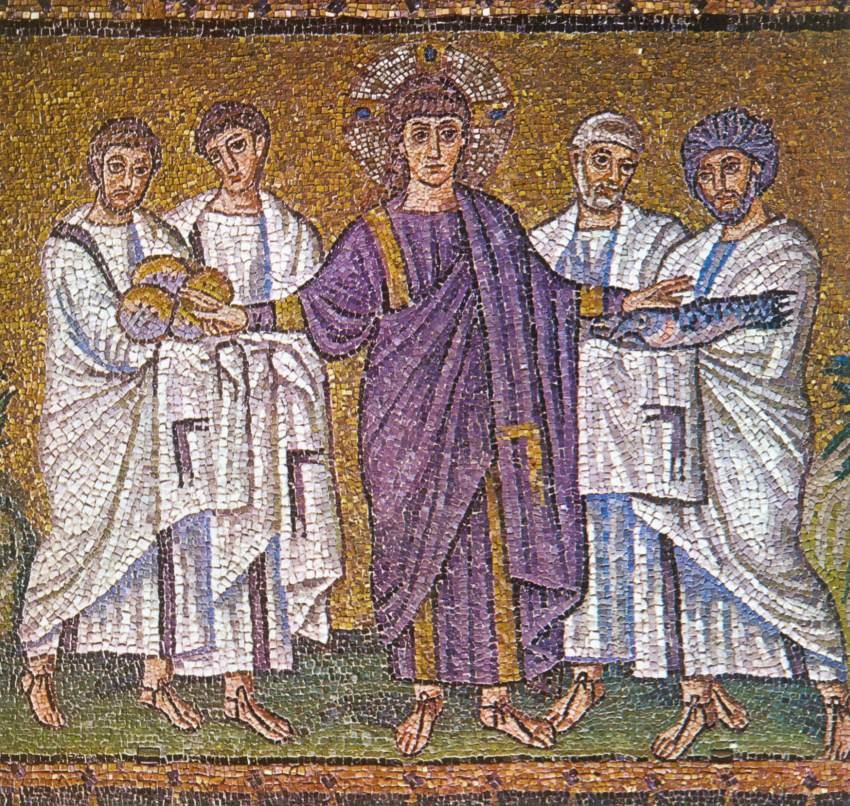
Four loaves of bread with dipped in holes (left) on a mosaic of Basilica of Sant'Apollinare Nuovo

The circumstances and the location of the Ovelgönne bread roll in the pit is the subject of debate. Some authors suggest a cultic context. This is attributed to the halving of the bread roll before its deposition and the baked in metal pieces. Whether the metal pieces were deliberately baked in or accidentally fell into the dough is unclear. Währen questions whether "the Ovelgönne bread roll was a technical creation or a replica of a profane or ritual object." He sums up the importance of the object up as follows:

The Ovelgönne bread roll represents the oldest bread survived of Europe, having a predefined shape, in a Wecken shaped form of fine pastry probably having a ritual and religious significance, perhaps for this reasons it has been made in its delicacy and refinement previously unimaginable.

His opinion is based on the remarkable subtlety of the used wheat flour, which is close to grain sizes of modern flours, as well as the incision and the dipped in holes. Such dipped in holes are also known from an ancient Egyptian find dating around 2000-1778 BCE as well as from mosaics at the Basilica of Sant'Apollinare Nuovo in Ravenna dating to the 6th Century. However, the dipped in hole on the Ovelgönne bread roll is the earliest prehistoric evidence for this technique in Europe.

== See also ==
- Food history
- List of bread rolls
- List of breads

== Literature ==
- Währen, Max (1996). "Vorgeschichtliche Brotreste aus der nördlichen Lüneburger Heide". Harburger Jahrbuch (in German). 19. Hamburg-Harburg: 11–38. ISSN 0722-6055.
- Währen, Max (2002). "Pain, pâtisserie et religion en Europe Pré- et Protohistorique Origines et attestations cultuelles". Civilisations (in French). 49: 381–400. doi:10.4000/civilisations.1822.
