= Seeve =

River in Germany

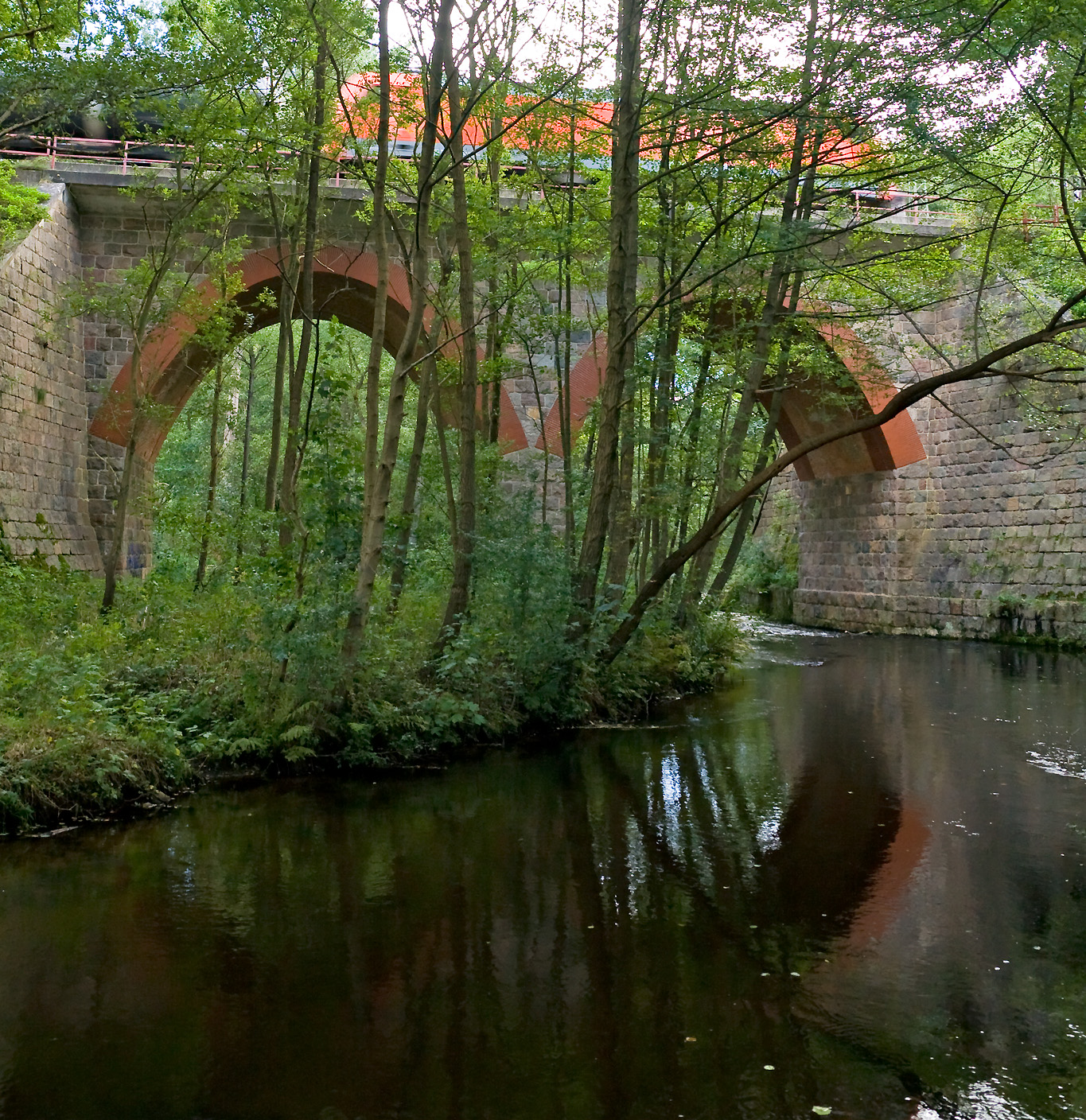
- Seeve near Jesteburg

Location
- Country: Germany
- State: Lower Saxony

Physical characteristics
- Source
  - location: Lüneburg Heath
- Mouth
  - location: Elbe
  - coordinates: 53.4246°N 10.1050°E
- Length: 40.8 km (25.4 mi)
- Basin size: 472 km^{2} (182 sq mi)

Basin features
- Progression: Elbe→ North Sea

Seeve (German pronunciation: [ˈzeːvə]; Low German: Seev) is a river of Lower Saxony, Germany, a tributary of the Elbe. It is approximately 40 km (25 mi) long.

The municipality of Seevetal is named after this river.

== Course ==
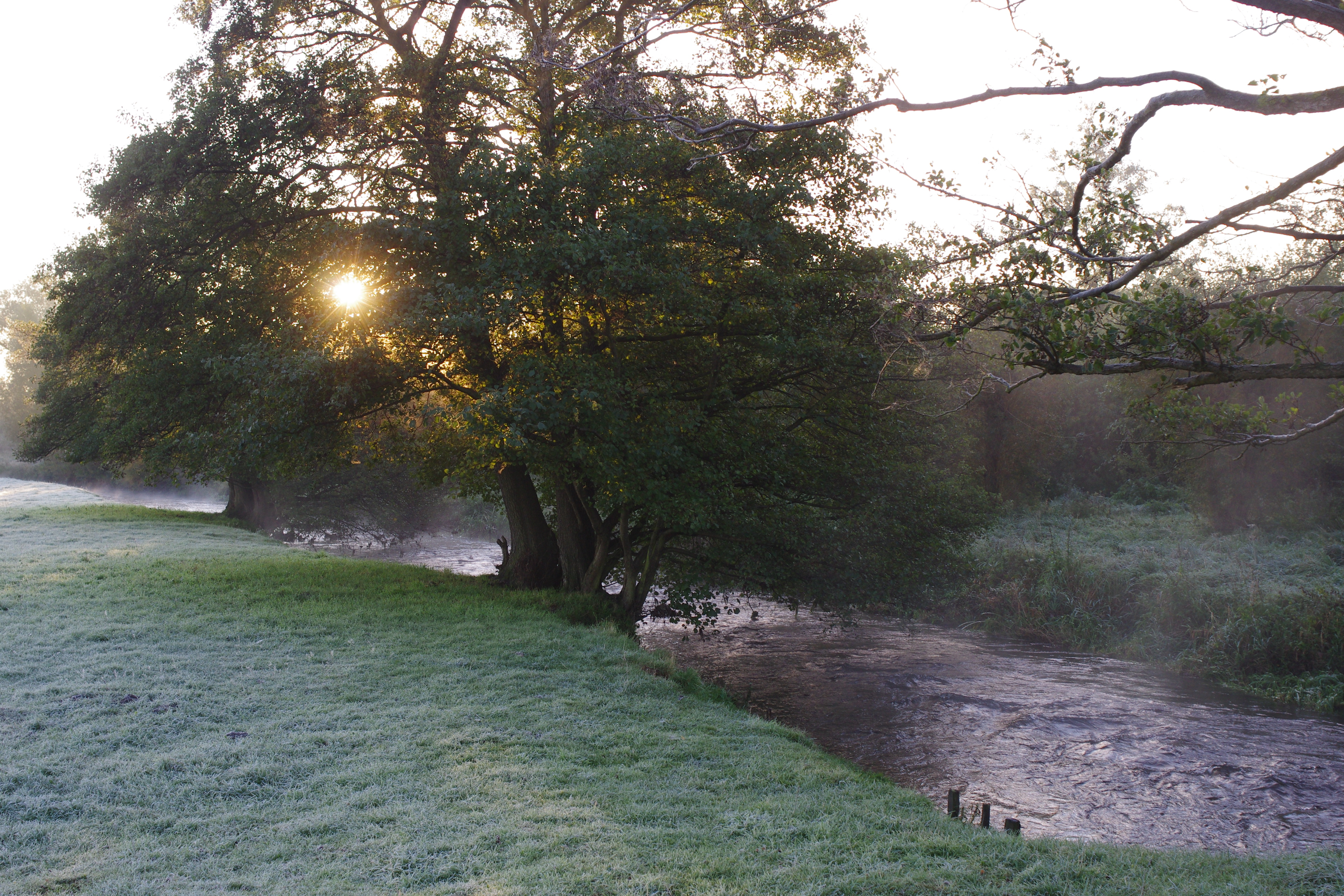
The Seeve in the Untere Seeveniederung a few kilometres before joining the Elbe

The Seeve source located is near Wehlen, south-east of Undeloh in the northern part of the Lüneburg Heath at an elevation of about 67 metres. It passes Holm, Lüllau, Jesteburg, Bendestorf, Ramelsloh, Horst, Lindhorst, Hittfeld, Karoxbostel, Glüsingen, Maschen and Hörsten. It then flows into the Elbe between Over and Wuhlenburg.

In Holm and Horst there are barrages to drive watermills. Just before joining the Elbe, the Seeve passes the natural reserve Untere Seeveniederung.

== Water ==
The Seeve has a relatively steady, low water temperature throughout the year of 7 °C (45 °F) and is known as coldest river in northern Germany.

== See also ==
- List of rivers of Lower Saxony
