= Over, Seevetal =

Coordinates: 53°26′09″N 10°05′47″E

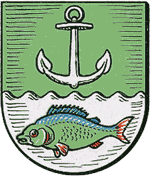
Over coat of arms

Over is a village in the municipality of Seevetal in Lower Saxony, Germany with about 1,400 citizens (as of December 2010). In 1972, Over and 18 other municipalities were assembled to form the new municipality of Seevetal.

== Geography ==
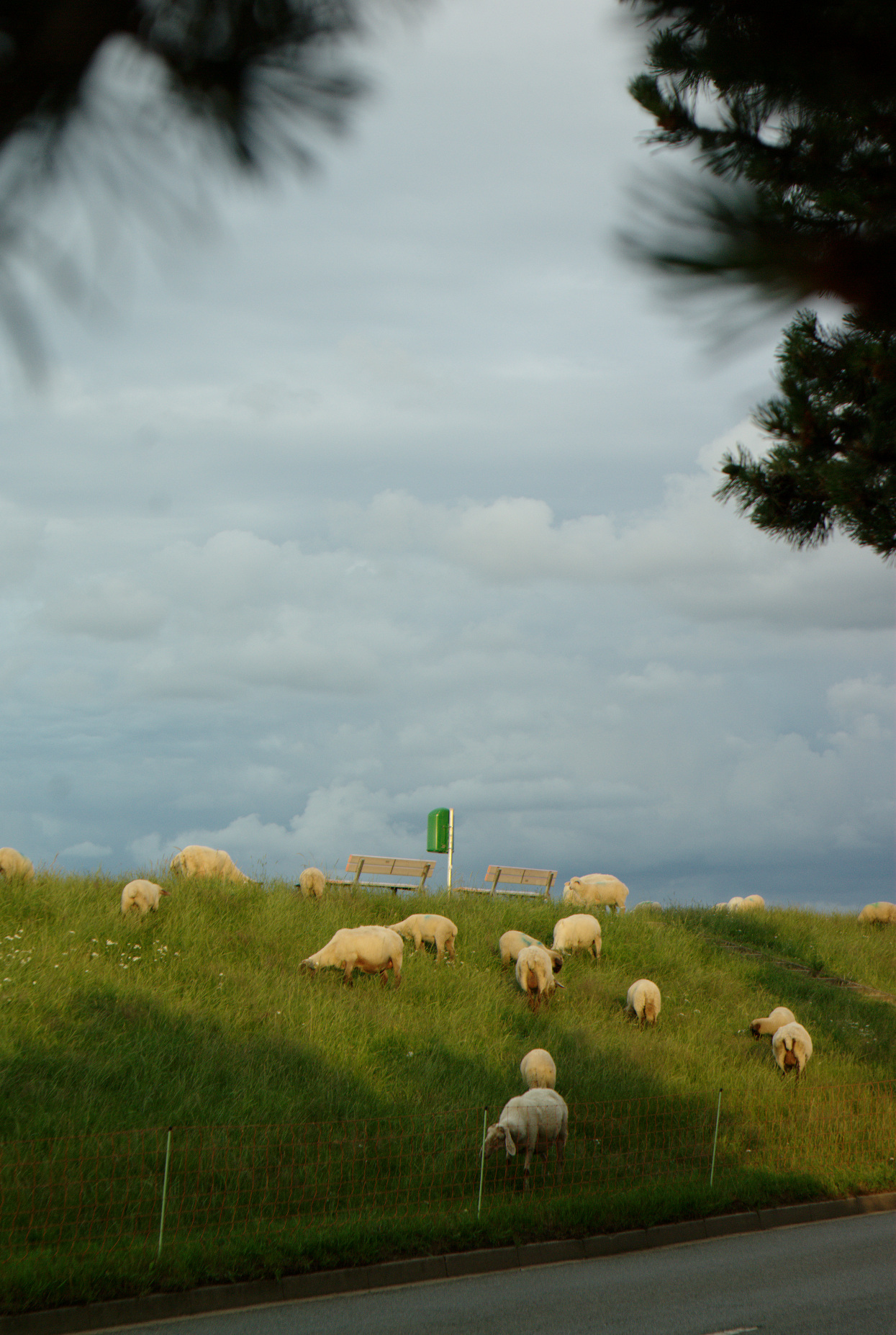
Elbe-dike in Over

Over lies south of the river Elbe. In Over, the river Seeve flows into the Elbe. A part of the natural reserve Untere Seeveniederung lies in Over.

== Sports ==
The sports club TSV Over-Bullenhausen was founded in 1931. Among its activities are soccer, tennis and swimming. Over has a public indoor swimming pool.
