= Metzendorf-Woxdorf head burial =

Stone age burial of a human skull from Lower-Saxony, Germany

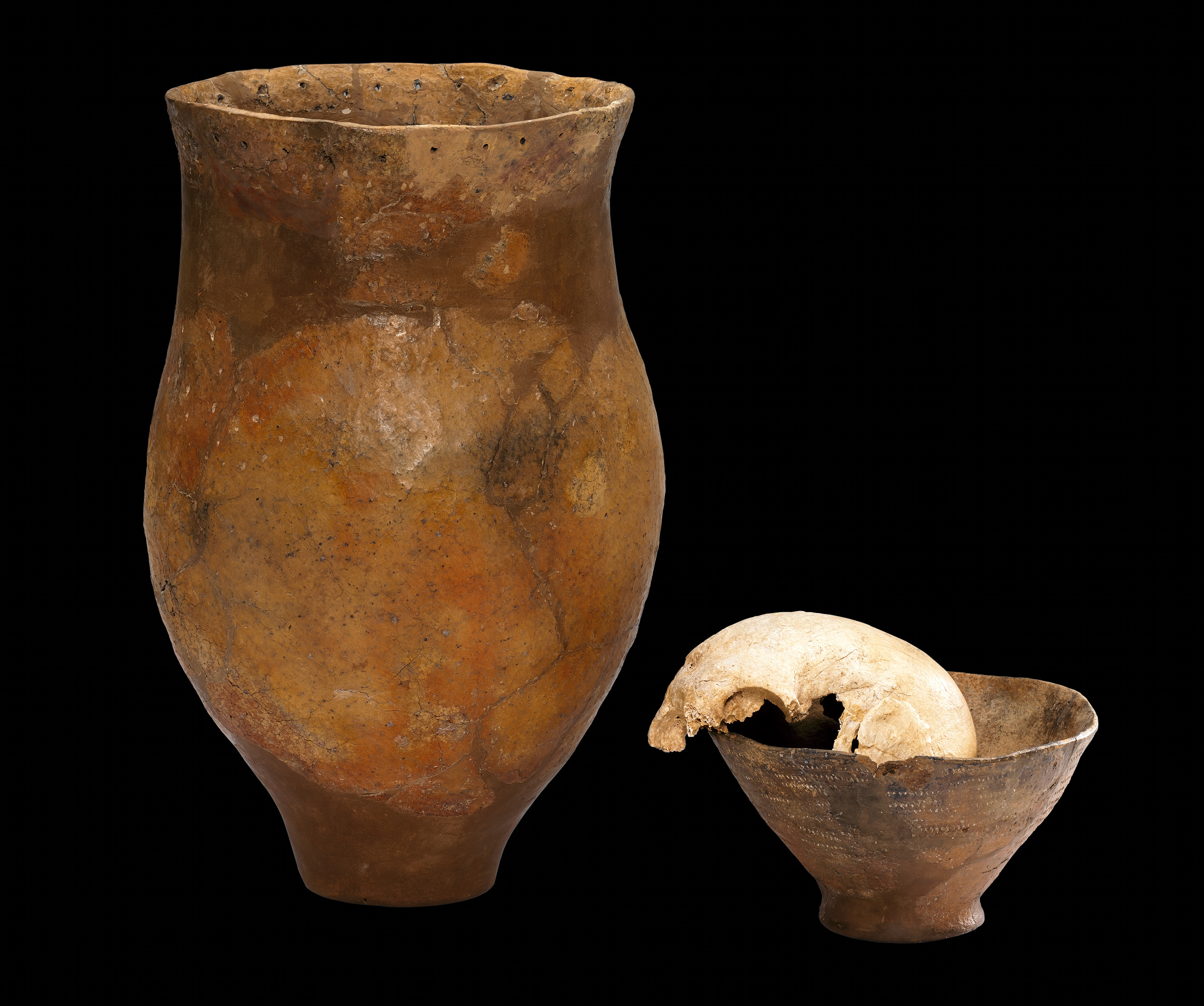
The Metzendorf-Woxdorf head burial

The Metzendorf-Woxdorf head of burial is the Neolithic burial of a single human skull that was found in 1958 in the Seevetal district of Woxdorf, in Harburg, in Lower Saxony. The find is currently the only one of its kind of the Single Grave Culture (German: Einzelgrabkultur) in Germany and is in the permanent exhibition of the Archaeological Museum Hamburg in Harburg, Hamburg.

== Discovery ==
Even before the discovery of the head burial numerous archaeological finds were made in the vicinity due to intensive agricultural land use. The find spot, was located at 53.408732°N 9.958667°E on a flat hilltop between two fields which has not been used for agriculture. The Metzendorf-Woxdorf head burial has been discovered during levelling work, while taking off soil of the hill with a bulldozer for a pipeline for the local the Metzendorf water supply association. The workers noticed broken ceramic sherds in the plained soil. They stopped their work on this site and reported their discovery to the Helms-Museum. During the following archaeological excavation, a large, upside stored giant beaker (German: Riesenbecher) was uncovered in a depth of 30 centimetres (12 in), the vessel floor and wall was broken by the levelling work. The giant beaker was put over a foot shell (German: Fußschale) which contains the remains of a single human skull.

== Findings ==
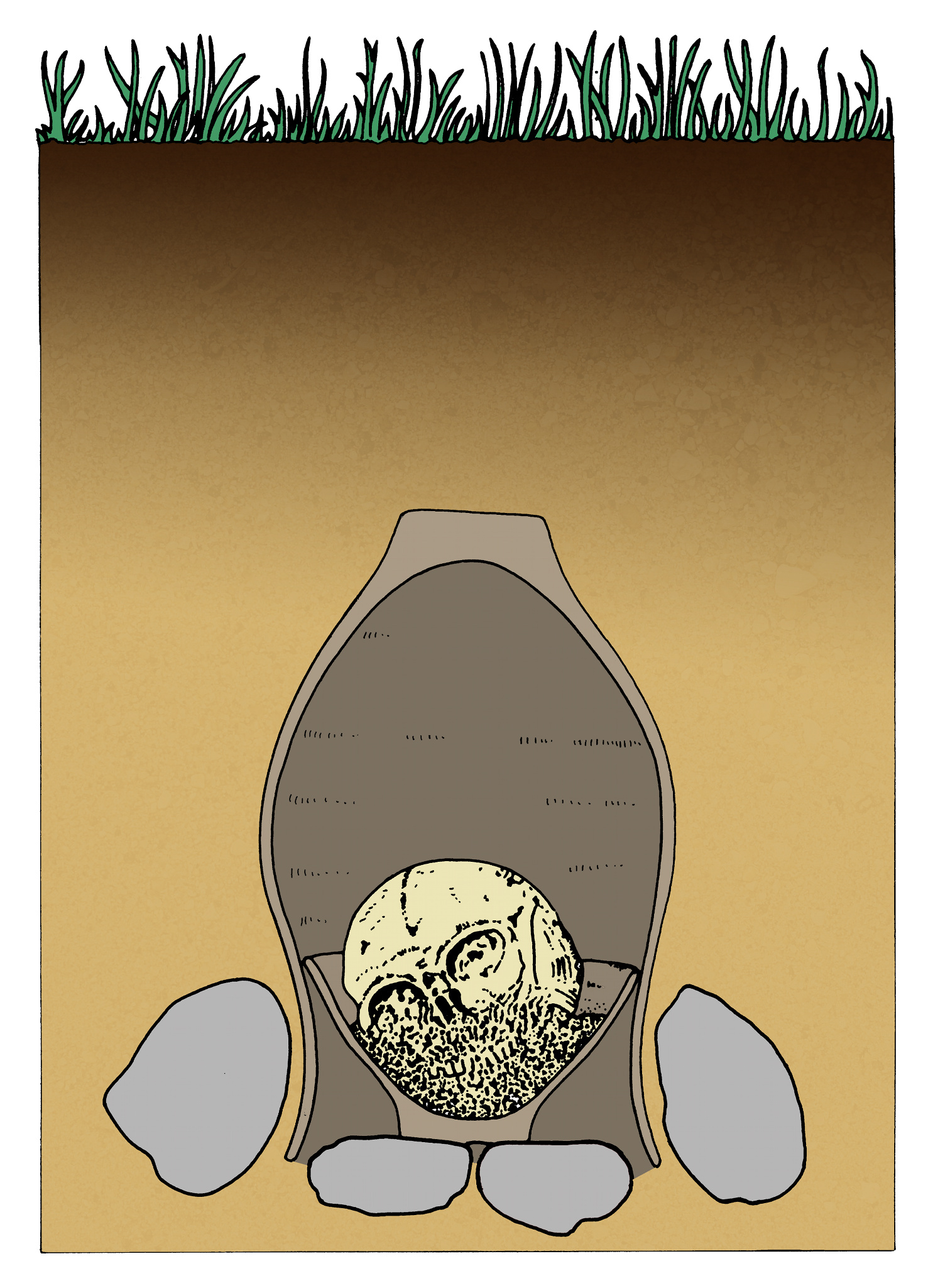
Graphic reconstruction of the burial in situ

The foot shell was placed on three smaller stones. It was made from a greyish brown clay having a height of 105 millimetres (4.1 in) and diameters of 83 millimetres (3.3 in) at the stand and 207 millimetres (8.1 in) at its mouth. The outside wall of the vessel is irregularly decorated with 23 millimetres (0.91 in) long parallel impressions of a comb-like tool. Inside, the foot shell was filled up to a height of two-thirds with humus soil on which the skull lay. The giant beaker was placed upside down over the cup. The retracted walls below the mouth of the vessel were carefully framed with larger stones. The giant beaker consists of a brownish-gray to reddish-brown clay. It has a height of 425 millimetres (16.7 in) with diameters of about 97 millimetres (3.8 in) at the base and 240 millimetres (9.4 in) at the mouth. Its largest diameter is 195 millimetres (7.7 in) to 210 millimetres (8.3 in) at a height of 265 millimetres (10.4 in) from the base. The shards of the damaged vessels base could not be recovered. Below the vessels rim, the vessel is decorated with an irregular series of small triangular recesses, whose tips are directed downward. Prior to its discovery the vessel and its interior was intact but it has been damaged with the bulldozer. The shape of the giant beaker corresponds to the Bentheim group, defined by Karl Hermann Jacob Friesen, although this vessel stands out because of its size. Wegewitz interprets the giant beaker as storage vessel. The skull has been preserved from its cranium to the ear bones and nasal bone, while the facial skeleton and jaws were probably decomposed after the funeral. The closed air space inside the large vessel favoured the preservation of the skull as opposed to being stored in well-aerated sandy soil at the site. In the earthy filling of the foot shell a few remains of tooth enamel were found. Due to its small amount Wegewitz suspected that at the times of the funeral only the head and upper jaw were present while the lower jaw and cervical vertebrae were already lost. The skull was anthropologically determined as most likely that of an adult male. Whether the burial was dug in a pit into the ground or settled above the ground could not be determined due to lack of soil discolouration at site. Likewise, it remains unclear whether the head burial was created in close proximity to a possibly nearby or lost full body burial.

Due to typological determination of the ceramic vessels the Metzendorf-Woxdorf head burial was dated to the Chalcolithic period, around 2200 BCE.

== Interpretation ==
The funeral of a single Human head, separated from his body is, unique for the northern German Neolithic so far, it suggests cultural influences from early Bronze Age Bohemia, where such separate head burials in ceramic vessels with their bodies buried underneath were common at the same time. Likewise, giant beakers similar to the Metzendorf-Woxdorf type were widely used there. Similar archaeological finds of giant beakers are known from the Hannoversches Wendland along the river Elbe supporting the theory of cultural ties to Bohemia, but the vessels found in Wendland were always found without content, so that the use as a funeral vessel here appears unlikely.

== Bibliography ==
- Articus, Rüdiger; Brandt, Jochen; Först, Elke; Krause, Yvonne; Merkel, Michael; Mertens, Kathrin; Weiss, Rainer-Maria (2013). Archaeological Museum Hamburg Helms-Museum: A short guide to the Tour of the Times. Archaeological Museum Hamburg publication - Helms-Museum. Vol. 103. Hamburg. p. 78. ISBN 978-3-931429-24-9.
- Wegewitz, Willi (1960). "Eine Schädelbestattung der Einzelgrabkultur". Nachrichten aus Niedersachsens Urgeschichte. 29: 6–17. ISSN 0342-1406.
- Laux, Friedrich (1995), Ralf Busch (ed.), Schädelbestattung aus Metzendorf-Woxdorf, Gem. Seevetal, Ldkr. Harburg, Fund und Deutung - Alte und neue Funde aus den archäologischen Sammlungen (in German), Hamburg-Harburg: Hamburger Museum für Archäologie und die Geschichte Harburgs Helms-Museum, pp. 28–29
