= Seevetal =

- Municipality
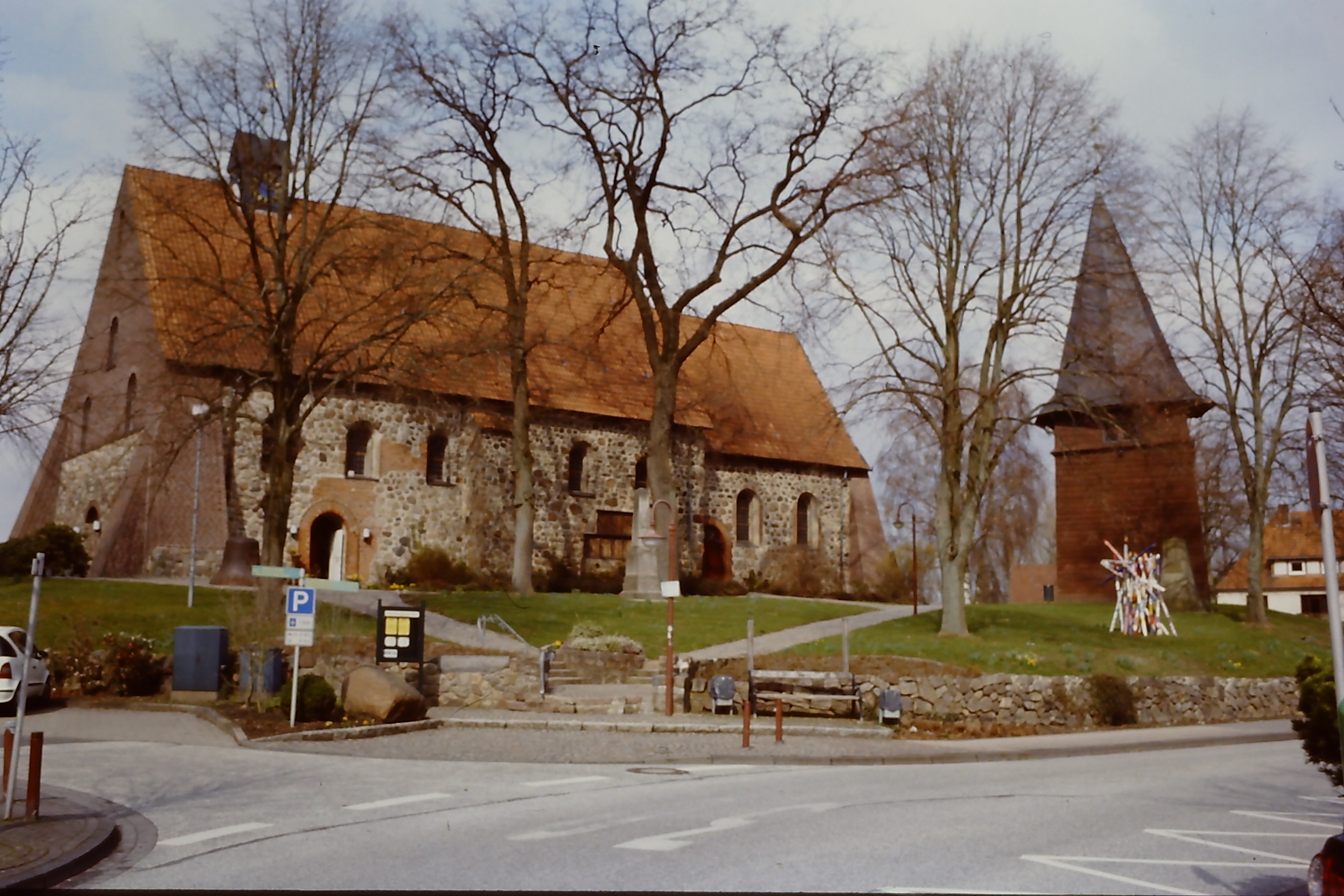
- Church of Saint Maurice at Hittfeld

- Flag Coat of arms

- Location of Seevetal within Harburg district
- Interactive map of Seevetal
- Location within Germany Location within Lower Saxony
- Coordinates: 53°23′N 09°58′E
- Country: Germany
- State: Lower Saxony
- District: Harburg

Government
  - Mayor (2021–26): Emily Weede (CDU)

Area
  - Total: 105.33 km^{2} (40.67 sq mi)
- Elevation: 3–70 m (9.8–229.7 ft)

Population (2025-12-31)
  - Total: 44,091
  - Density: 418.60/km^{2} (1,084.2/sq mi)
- Time zone: UTC+01:00 (CET)
  - Summer (DST): UTC+02:00 (CEST)
- Postal codes: 21220, 21217, 21218
- Dialling codes: 04105, 04185, 040
- Vehicle registration: WL
- Website: www.seevetal.de

Seevetal (German pronunciation: [ˈzeːvətaːl]; Low German: Seevdaal; both lit. 'Seeve Valley') is a municipality in the district of Harburg, in Lower Saxony, Germany. It is situated approximately 20 km south of Hamburg, and 15 km west of Winsen (Luhe). Its seat is in the village Hittfeld. It is named after the river Seeve.

== History ==
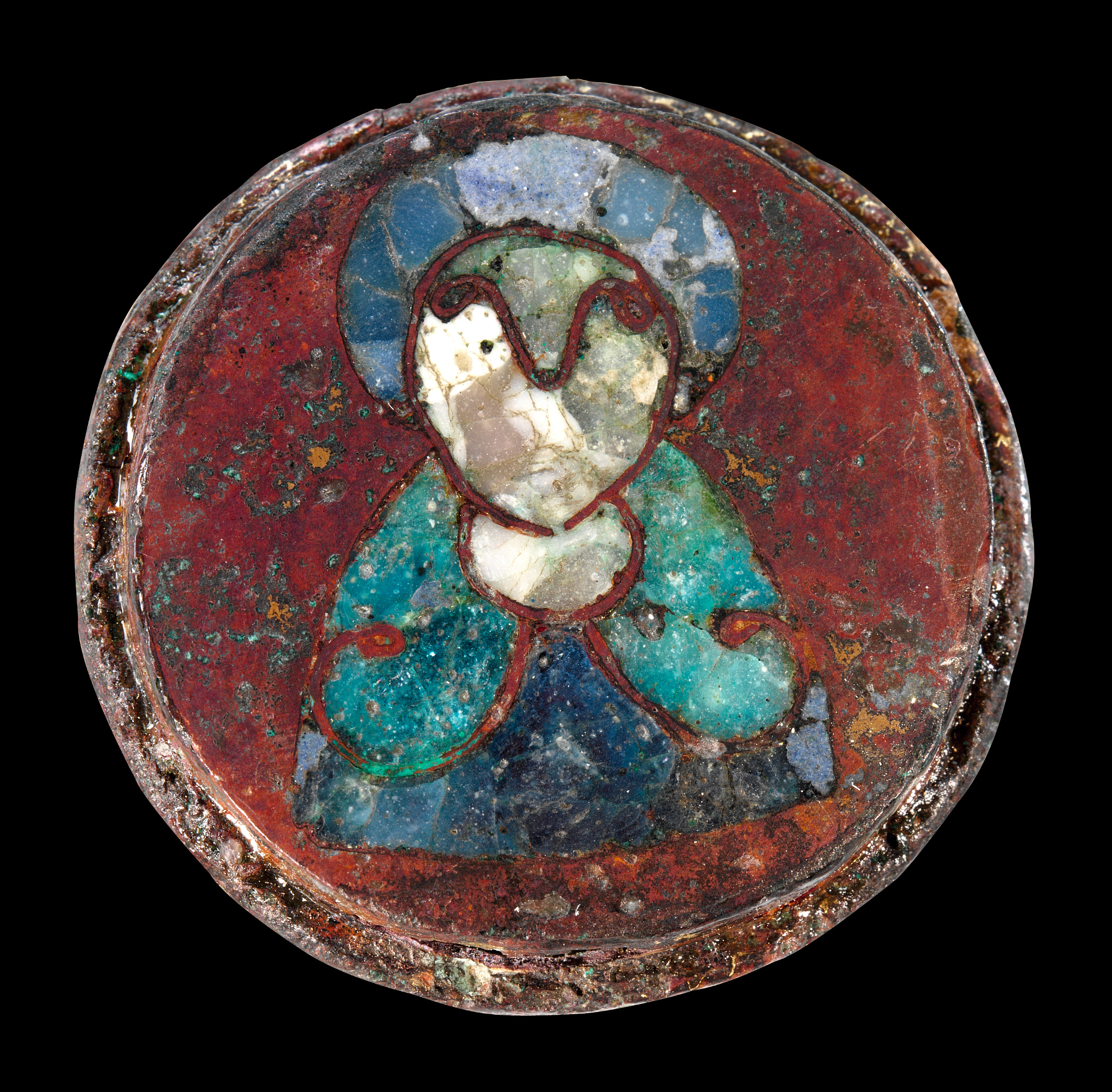
Maschen disc brooch

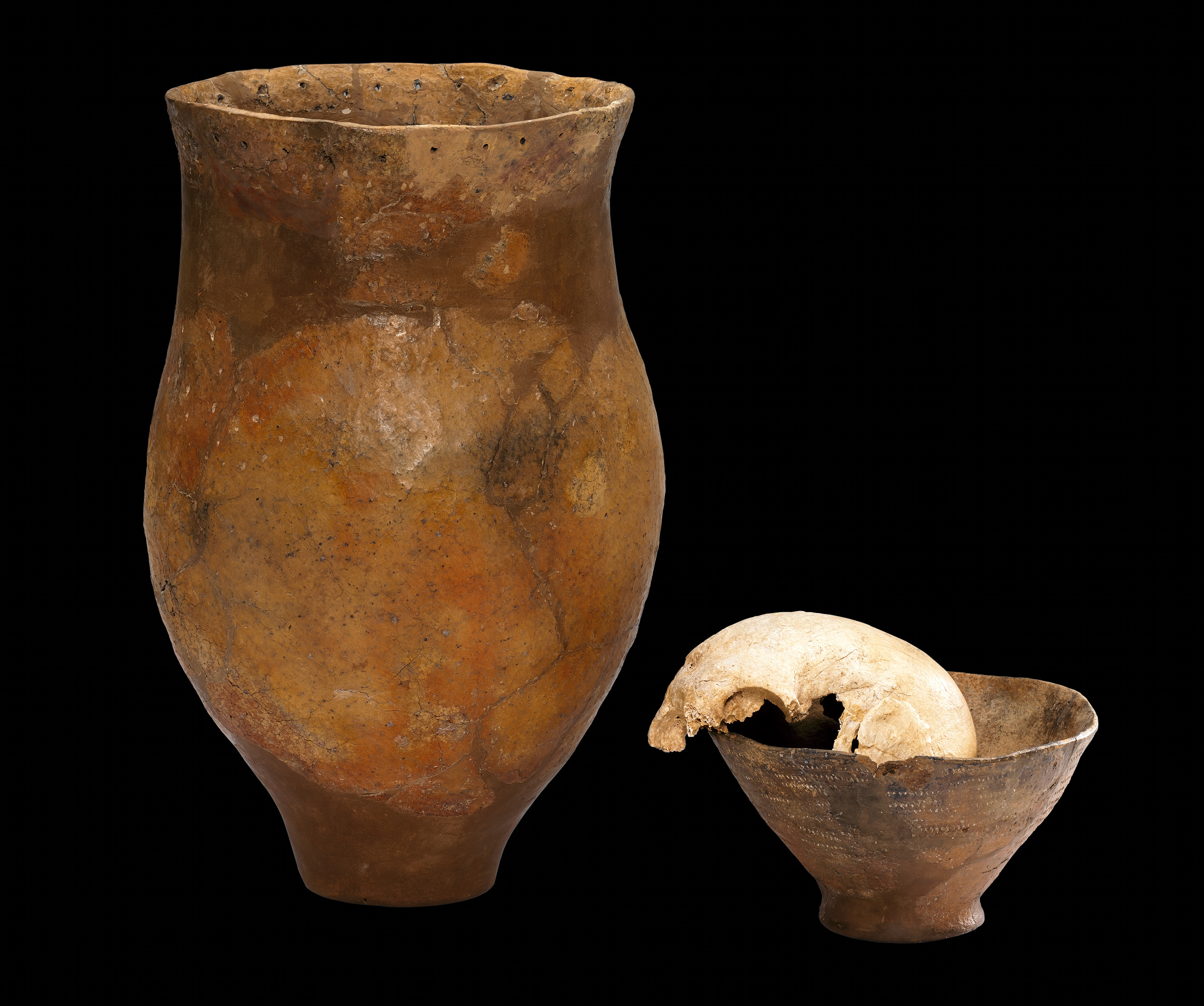
The Metzendorf-Woxdorf head burial

On 1 July 1972, the administrations of 19 independent smaller municipalities were merged to form the Seevetal municipality. The 19 towns and villages forming Seevetal are Beckedorf, Bullenhausen, Emmelndorf, Fleestedt, Glüsingen, Groß Moor, Helmstorf, Hittfeld, Holtorfsloh, Horst, Hörsten, Klein Moor, Lindhorst, Maschen, Meckelfeld, Metzendorf, Ohlendorf, Over and Ramelsloh.

Several of these towns have a rich history: the existence of Ramelsloh was first vouched in the year 845, Maschen was first mentioned in official documents in 1294, and Hittfeld celebrated its 900th anniversary in June 2007. The St. Mauritius church in Hittfeld dates back to the 12th century. Remarkable archaeological finds of the region are the Metzendorf-Woxdorf head burial dating to ca. 2200 BCE or the early Christian Maschen disc brooch which are in the permanent exhibition of the nearby Archaeological Museum Hamburg.

== Populated places ==
Seevetal is further subdivided into 19 villages and hamlets, which are grouped into six boroughs:

- Fleestedt: Fleestedt, Glüsingen, Beckedorf, Metzendorf
- Hittfeld: Hittfeld, Emmelndorf, Helmstorf, Lindhorst
- Maschen: Maschen, Horst, Hörsten
- Meckelfeld: Meckelfeld, Klein-Moor
- Over: Over, Bullenhausen, Groß-Moor
- Ramelsloh: Ramelsloh, Ohlendorf, Holtorfsloh

== Demographics ==
Population of Seevetal (as of December 31 of each year):

- 1998 – 39,564
- 1999 – 40,164
- 2000 – 40,536
- 2001 – 40,819
- 2002 – 41,060
- 2003 – 41,157
- 2004 – 41,287
- 2005 – 41,614

Seevetal is the most populous German municipality that has no city rights, i.e., it is the most populous rural municipality ("Gemeinde") in Germany.

== Politics ==
The council of the Seevetal municipality consists of 40 seats. The current council was elected on September 10, 2006 and consists of:

- CDU – 17 seats
- SPD – 13 seats
- BIS – 4 seats
- FDP – 3 seats
- Alliance 90/The Greens – 3 seats

The current mayor Emily Weede (CDU) was elected on 26 September 2021.

== Sport ==
- TuS Fleestedt
- HSG Seevetal
- TSV Eintracht Hittfeld
- SC Seevetal
- HSG Seevetal/Ashausen
- VfL Maschen
- ESV Maschen
- MTV Ramelsloh
- PBC Seevetal e.V. – Poolbillard
- SV Emmelndorf
- TV Meckelfeld
- Schützenverein Moor
- TSV Over Bullenhausen
- Windsurfer Seevetal e.V.

== Twin towns – sister cities ==
Seevetal is twinned with:

- Decatur, United States

== Notable people ==
- Caroline Daur (born 1995), fashion blogger, grew up here
