= Bishop's Tower =

Coordinates: 53°33′00″N 9°59′51″E

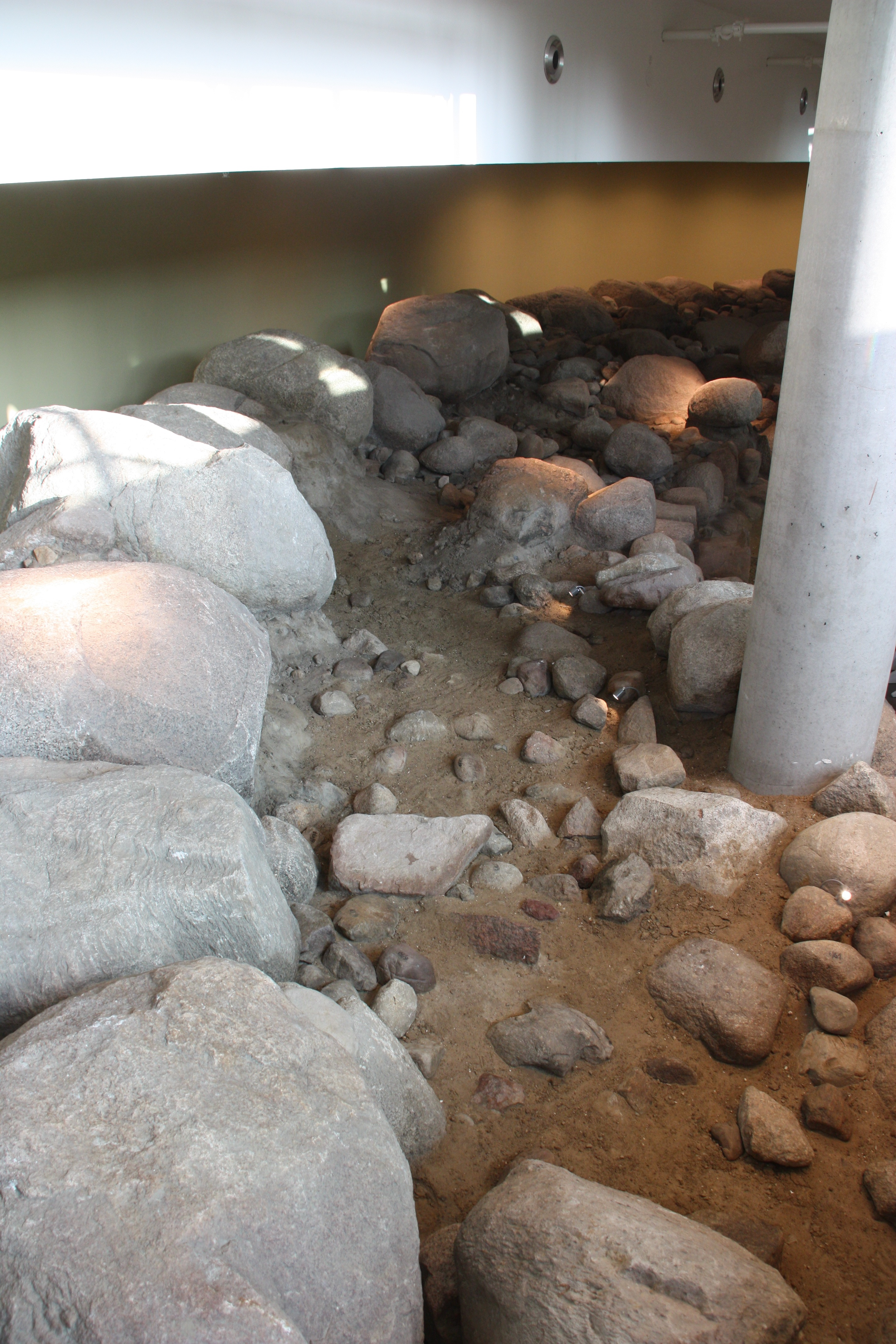
Part of the stone circle forming the tower's foundation

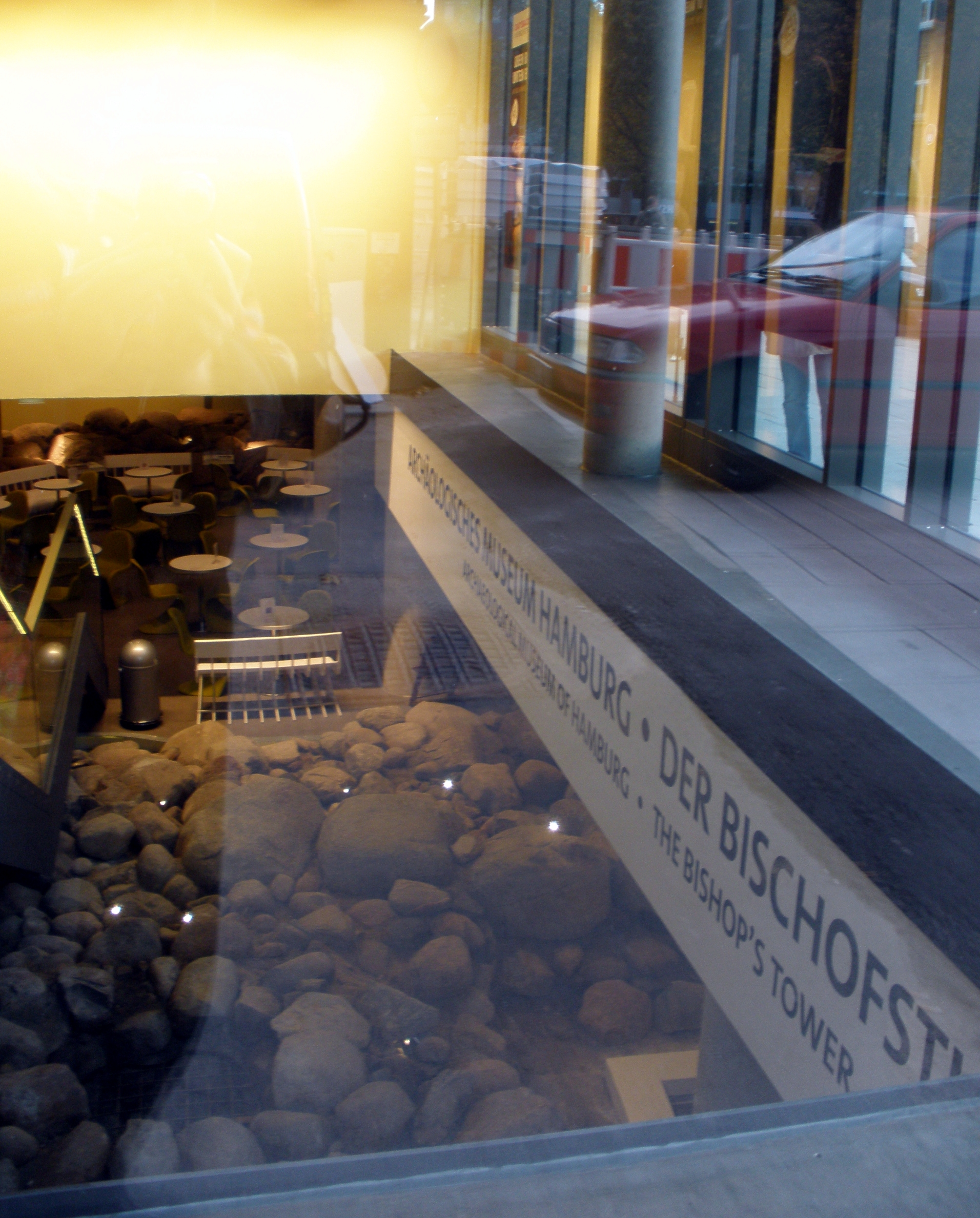
A view down into the showroom from outside. The well can be seen in the lower left.

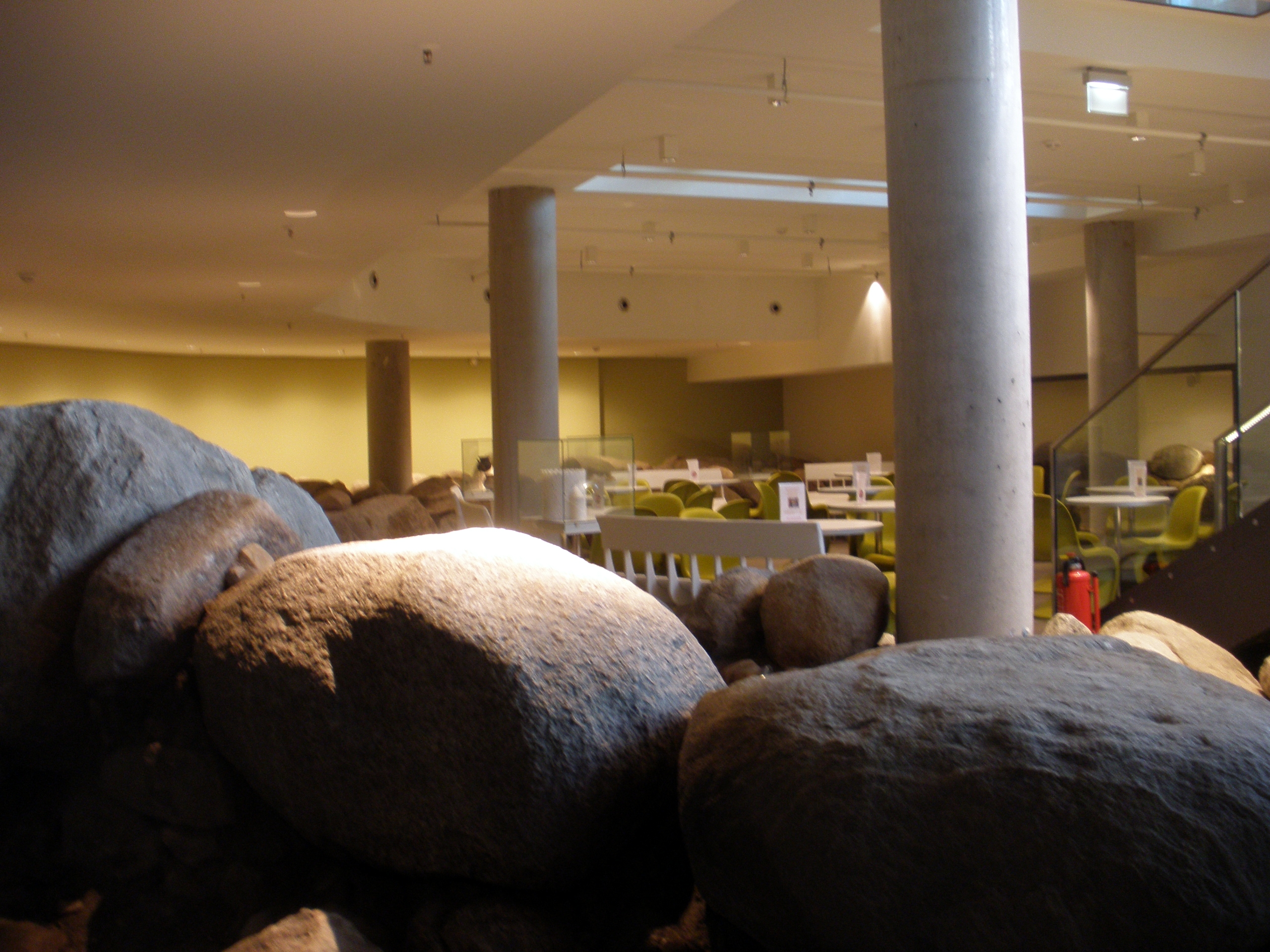
The Bishop's Tower with café

The Bishop's Tower (German: Bischofsturm), or Bishop's Castle (Bischofsburg), is an archaeological site in the historic city center of Hamburg, Germany, containing the oldest known remains of a stone building in the city. The site includes the foundations of a circular tower and a well, originally believed to represent the 11th-century stone residence of Archbishop Adalbrand of Bremen. Later finds, however, disproved this theory and it is now considered to be part of a 12th-century defensive structure.

== Location and significance ==
The tower's foundations lie under a commercial building at the corner of Kreuslerstraße and Speersort in the immediate vicinity of St. Peter's Church. The area is a light geest, where the first settlement of Hamburg has been documented. The base of the tower was discovered on 30 August 1962 during demolition work for the St. Peter's Community Center. Initially it was assumed that displaced boulders from nearby Steinstraße had been found, which is believed to be the oldest street of the city of Hamburg, and an ancient trade route. But after further excavation the remaining foundations of the tower were uncovered.

Until the 2008 excavations, it was thought to be the stone house of the Archbishop Adalbrand, built as a round tower and mentioned in the Hamburg church history of 1074 by Adam of Bremen. Further construction on St. Peter's Community Center enabled new studies of the historic area, leading to the discovery that the tower's foundation coincided with the creation of a moat to the west, located right in front of the Heidenwall, a timber soil palisade known as the first fortification of Hamburg. With this information the dating was corrected to the 12th century. A possible interpretation is that the tower represents a side gate or a part of the city gate.

== The finds ==
The tower's foundation is a stone circle of boulders with an outer diameter of 19 metres (62 ft) and an inner diameter of 11 metres (36 ft). The majority of these stones have a diameter of 1 metre (3.3 ft) or more. On the west side was a water well with a depth of 4 metres (13 ft), a diameter of 4.4 metres (14 ft), and was made of field stones roughly 50 centimetres (20 in) in diameter.

== The showroom ==
A showroom was built for the tower's foundations and other artifacts in early 1969 in the basement of the newly completed community center (and later commercial building). After demolition in 2008 for the construction of the St. Petri-Hof building, the showroom was redesigned as a branch of the Hamburg Archaeological Museum. It is now freely accessible to visitors through a commercial bakery on the ground floor, which has also set up a café amidst the tower's foundations.

== Literature ==
- Trede, Beate (December 2011). "Der Bischofsturm". Helms-Museum Aktuell. 24. Museums- und Heimatverein: 1–2.
- Först, Elke (2004), Der Bischofsturm (in German), Hamburg: Helms-Museum, ISBN 3-931429-10-5
- Busch, Ralf; Harck, Ole (2002), Domplatzgrabung in Hamburg - Teil 2 (in German), Neumünster: Wachholtz, ISBN 3-529-01846-5
- Busch, Ralf (1995), Domplatzgrabung in Hamburg - Teil 1 (in German), Neumünster: Wachholtz, ISBN 3-529-01847-3
