= Bullenhausen =

This image shows the location of the marked district in the Gemeinde Seevetal.

Bullenhausen (Low German Bullenhuus) is a district of the municipality Seevetal in the county of Harburg in Lower Saxony.

Bullenhausen has a population of 1271 (35 of which own a secondary residence) and it is located at the Elbe southeast of Hamburg. The former independent municipality of Bullenhausen, together with 18 other districts, is a part of Seevetal since the 1 July 1972. On 3 October 1975 the town twinning arrangement with Decatur (Illinois), United States, was officially sealed. Bullenhausen owns a yacht club.

== Notable people ==
- Inge Meysel (1910–2004) – actress
- John Olden (1918–1965) – movie director, movie producer and screenwriter

== Trivia ==
- Two robinia, each about 250 years old, are located in Bullenhausen
- A two-circuit 380 kV overhead line crosses the Elbe on two 117 m high masts each with a span of 666 meters.
