= Maschen =

Village in Seevetal, Lower Saxony, Germany

Coordinates: 53°23′54″N 10°2′24″E

Maschen's coat of arms

Maschen is a village in the municipality of Seevetal in Hamburg district in the German state of Lower Saxony. It lies south of Hamburg on the northern edge of the Lüneburg Heath and within the commuter zone of the city of Hamburg. Maschen Marshalling Yard is the largest of its kind in Europe and the second biggest in the world. It was opened in 1977.

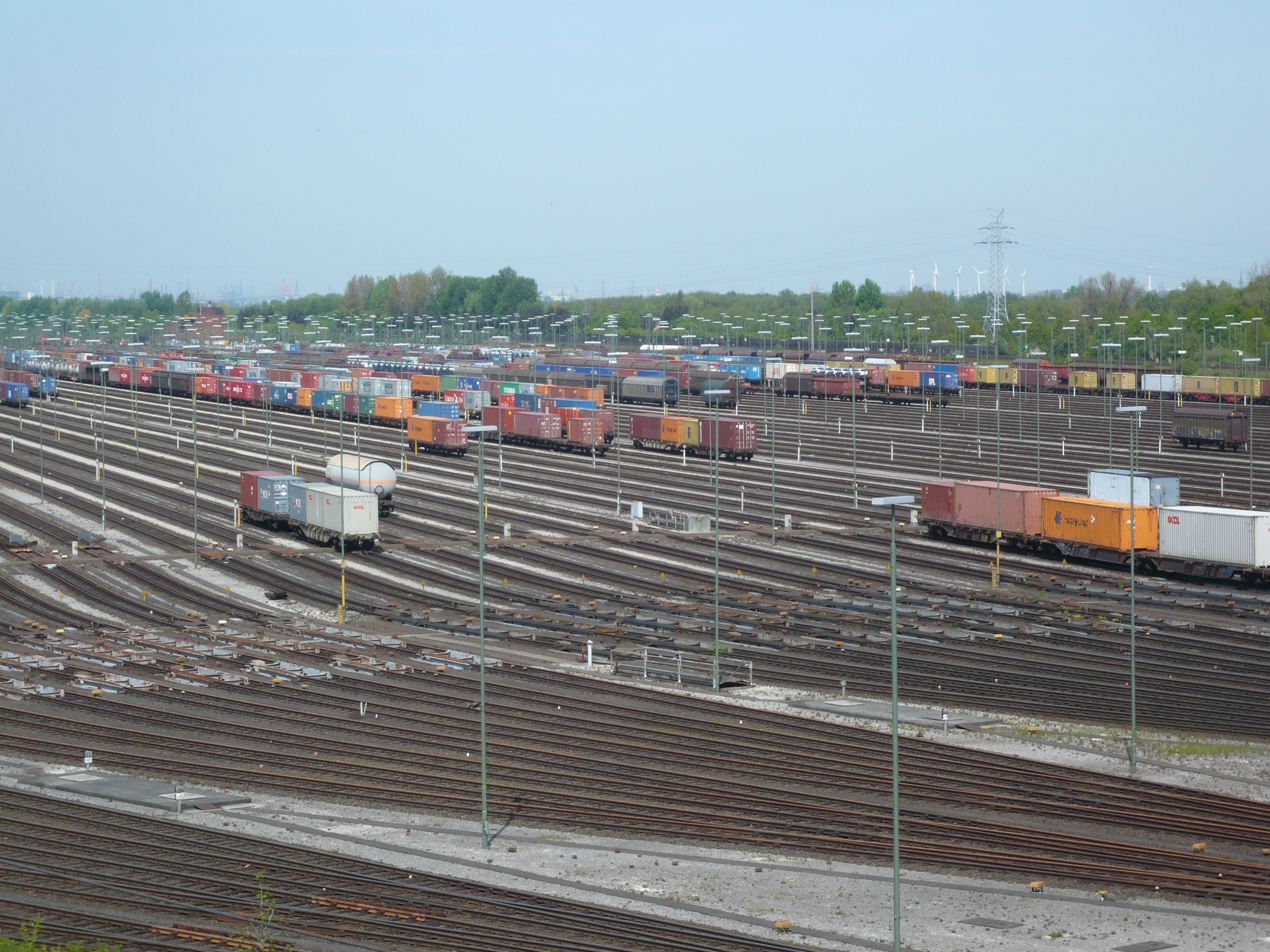
Part of the Maschen Marshalling Yard

With its 9,266 inhabitants (as of 2005), Maschen is the second largest village in Seevetal.

== History ==
Maschen was first mentioned in the records in 1294 as Merschene (Low German = end of the marsh).

In 1671 the first school was built; it has moved location several times since. Today Maschen Primary School is in the centre of Maschen next to the village hall. The town's historic tower clock has been restored and installed in the primary school.

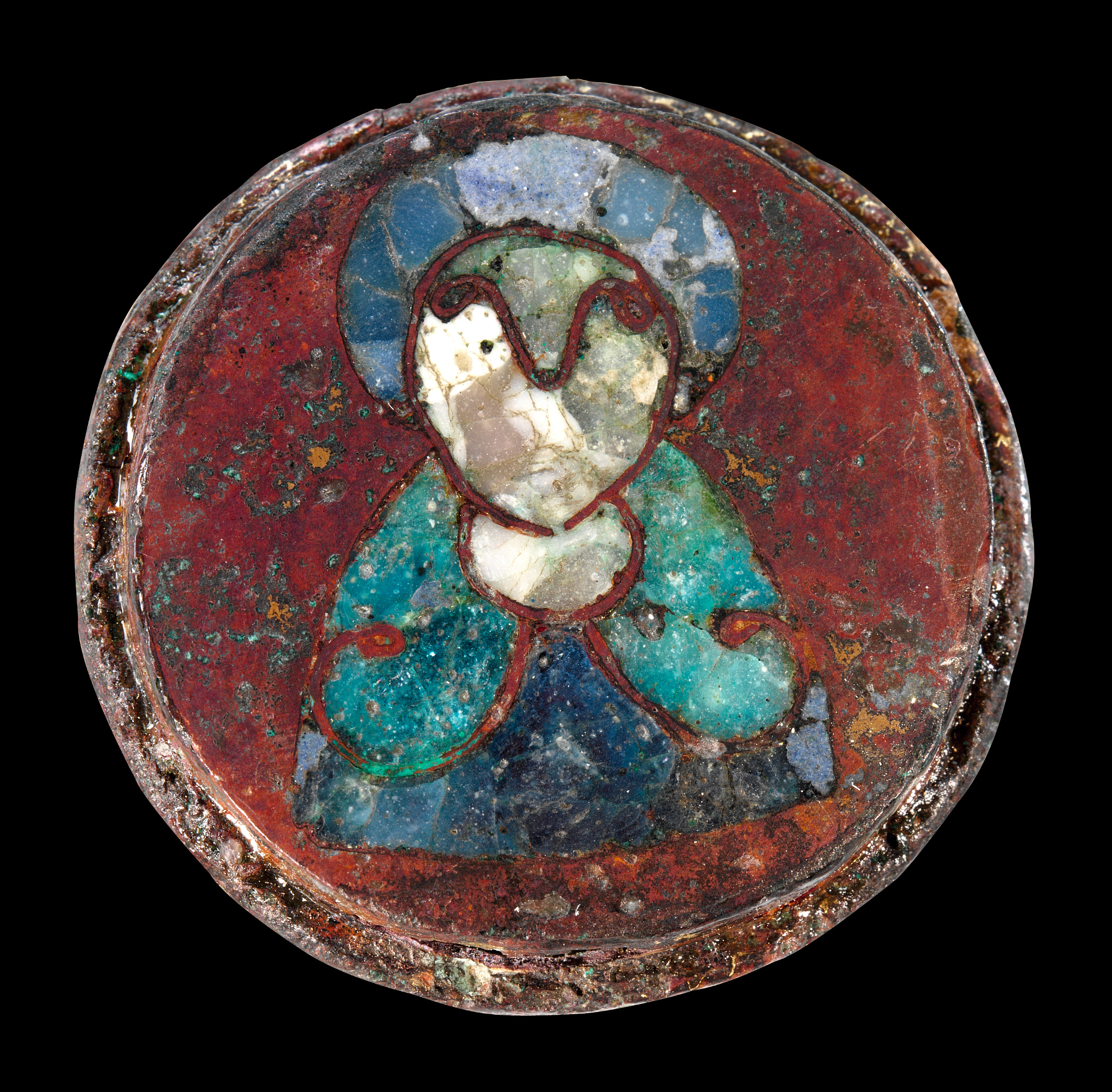
Maschen disc brooch

The Maschen disc brooch is an Early Medieval fibula, which was found on the late Saxon grave field near Maschen.

The Hanover–Harburg railway line which opened in 1847 laid track through Maschen, which received its own stop in 1901, and its own station building in 1904–1905.
