= Maschen disc brooch =

9th-century fibula

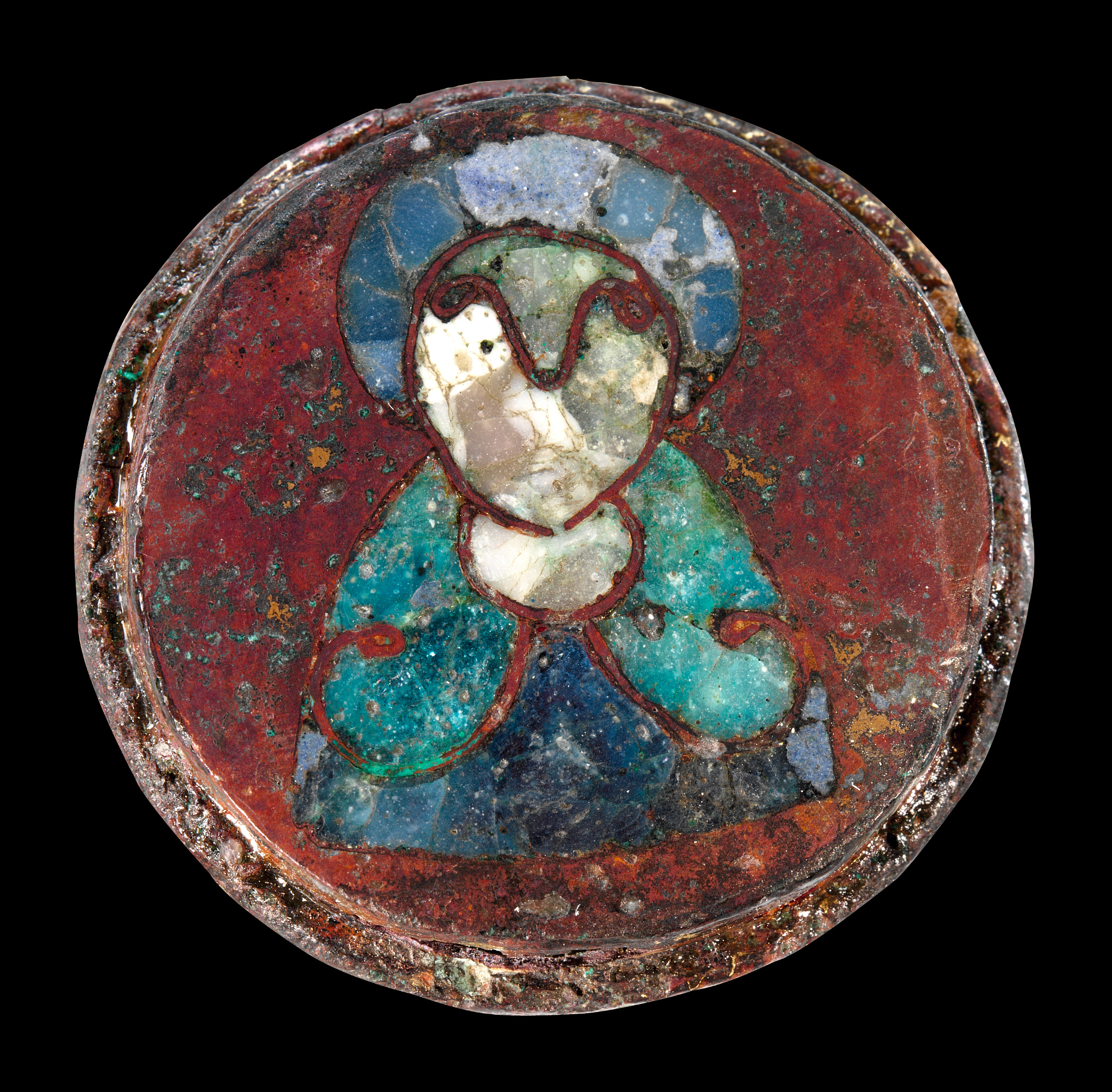
- Year: 9th century AD
- Type: Brooch
- Medium: Vitreous enamel on copper and loam
- Subject: Animal
- Dimensions: 30 mm diameter (1.2 in)
- Location: Archäologisches Museum Hamburg; Maschen
- Owner: Archäologisches Museum Hamburg

The Maschen disc brooch (German: Scheibenfibel von Maschen) is an Early Medieval fibula. It was found in 1958 during archaeological excavations of the late Saxon grave field near Maschen, in the Lower Saxony district of Harburg, Germany. On its face side, the fibula shows an unidentified saint with a halo. It was found in a woman's grave of the beginning of the Christianization of northern Germany, and is in the permanent exhibition of the Archaeological Museum Hamburg in Harburg, Hamburg.

== Discovery ==
The cemetery was located on the western fringes of the Hallonen, an approximately 63-metre-high (207 ft) mountain range which is running out on the 23-metre-high (75 ft) Fuchsberg some 1,200 metres (3,900 ft) southeast of the village center of Maschen. During sand extraction from the Fuchsberg for the construction of the nearby Bundesautobahn 1, two Bronze Age tumuli were discovered in 1958.

The following excavations revealed that both grave mounds were disturbed to the undisturbed ground. Except for a few ceramic vessel shards and a razor from several later burials on the hill, no further findings were recorded. While pushing off the humuslayer 20 metres (66 ft) north of the tumuli, the first late Saxon flat graves appeared in the ground. Additionally some soil discolorations appeared at a brim of the sand mine some 80 metres (260 ft) east, indicating burial pits. During the initially launched rescue excavation, the complete burial site were excavated and documented in a three-week operation. It was the first fully documented late Saxon burial site of northern Germany so far with a total of 210 examined burials.

21 burials were oriented in south-north direction and the majority of 189 burials were created in west-east orientation. The Maschen disc brooch was found in the grave No. 54 of a wealthy woman.

== Findings ==
The Maschen disc brooch lay with its face side down on the woman's chest. The brooch has a diameter of 30 millimetres (1.2 in) and is made of different colored vitreous enamel in cloisonné technique on a copper plate. The copper base of the brooch is can shaped, and the enamel plate was fixed in the copper base on a bed of loam by flanging the protruding edges of the bases wall. The needle apparatus was not preserved. The remaining hinges indicate that it was a needle with a coil spring. Both the metal parts and enamel inlays are slightly worn. A radiological examination revealed that the enamel layer has a thickness of 0.4 millimetres (0.016 in). The front face of the disc brooch depicts a stylized chest portrait on a now red background. The face and neck of the portrayed person are made of now greenish white enamel. Its eyes and nose region is formed by a curved bar made of copper, ending in two loops as stylized eyes. Around the head a kind of halo is shown, made of whitish to light blue enamel. The upper body has a semi-elliptical shape. The body is decorated by two widely arced copper bars from the neck towards the shoulders, which end there in small loops. The area around the neck of the figure is made of now light blue to turquoise enamel. The lower chest area, below the copper bars, is made of a now dark blue enamel.

== Interpretation ==
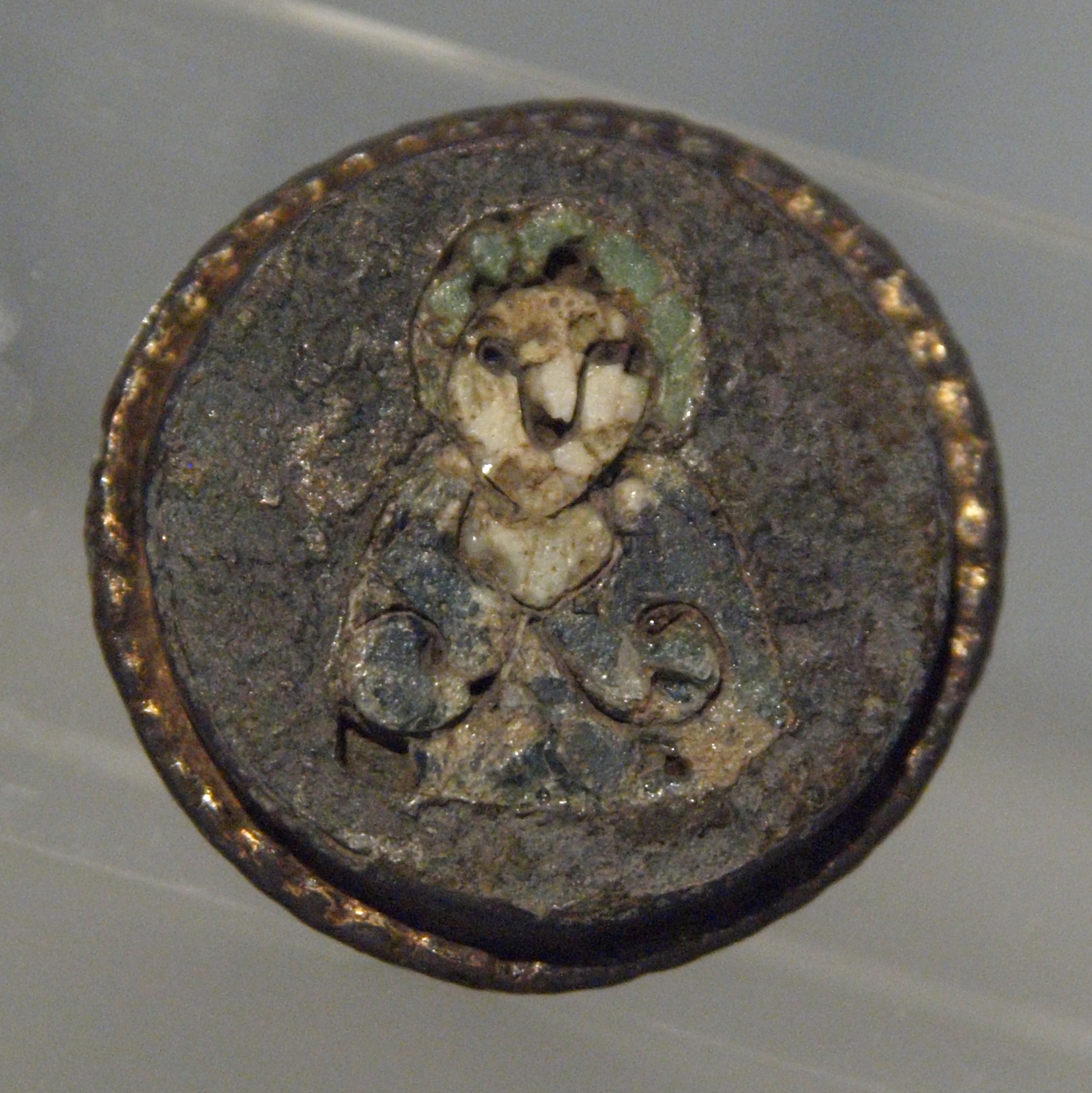
The almost identical Todtglüsingen disc brooch

Due to its halo-like ornament around the head, the figure on the Maschen disc brooch is interpreted as an unspecified saint, and may possibly depict Jesus Christ. The addition of the fibula as a grave good indicates that the buried woman was an early Christian. She may have promised herself a salvation effect from the depicted figure, as the brooch was found placed with its face side on her chest.

Due to the geographical orientation of the burial and its location within the cemetery, the burial has been dated to the period between 800 and 900 AD, which marks the beginning of the thorough Christianization of Northern Germany.

So far, some 100 comparison finds of fibulae of the Maschen disc brooch type were known, but they all came from stray finds or were collected from the surface without any assignment to a specific grave, and therefore a more precise dating of this type of brooches has been impossible before.

By the end of 2012 another nearly identical piece was found in a construction area at the Tostedt district of Todtglüsingen. The origin of this fibula is believed to be the Lower Rhine region and the noticeable accumulation of finds at the Niederelbe area may indicate that it has faced an increased popularity especially in this region.

== Bibliography ==
- Articus, Rüdiger; Brandt, Jochen; Först, Elke; Krause, Yvonne; Merkel, Michael; Mertens, Kathrin; Weiss, Rainer-Maria (2013). Archaeological Museum Hamburg Helms-Museum: A short guide to the Tour of the Times. Archaeological Museum Hamburg publication. Vol. 103. Hamburg: Helms-Museum. p. 159. ISBN 978-3-931429-24-9.
- Wegewitz, Willi (1988). "Das Reihengräberfeld von Maschen". Hammaburg N.F (in German). 8: 161-171 (164-165). ISBN 3-529-01356-0. ISSN 0173-0886.

This article has been translated in part from the German Wikipedia equivalent.
