= Archäologisches Museum Hamburg =

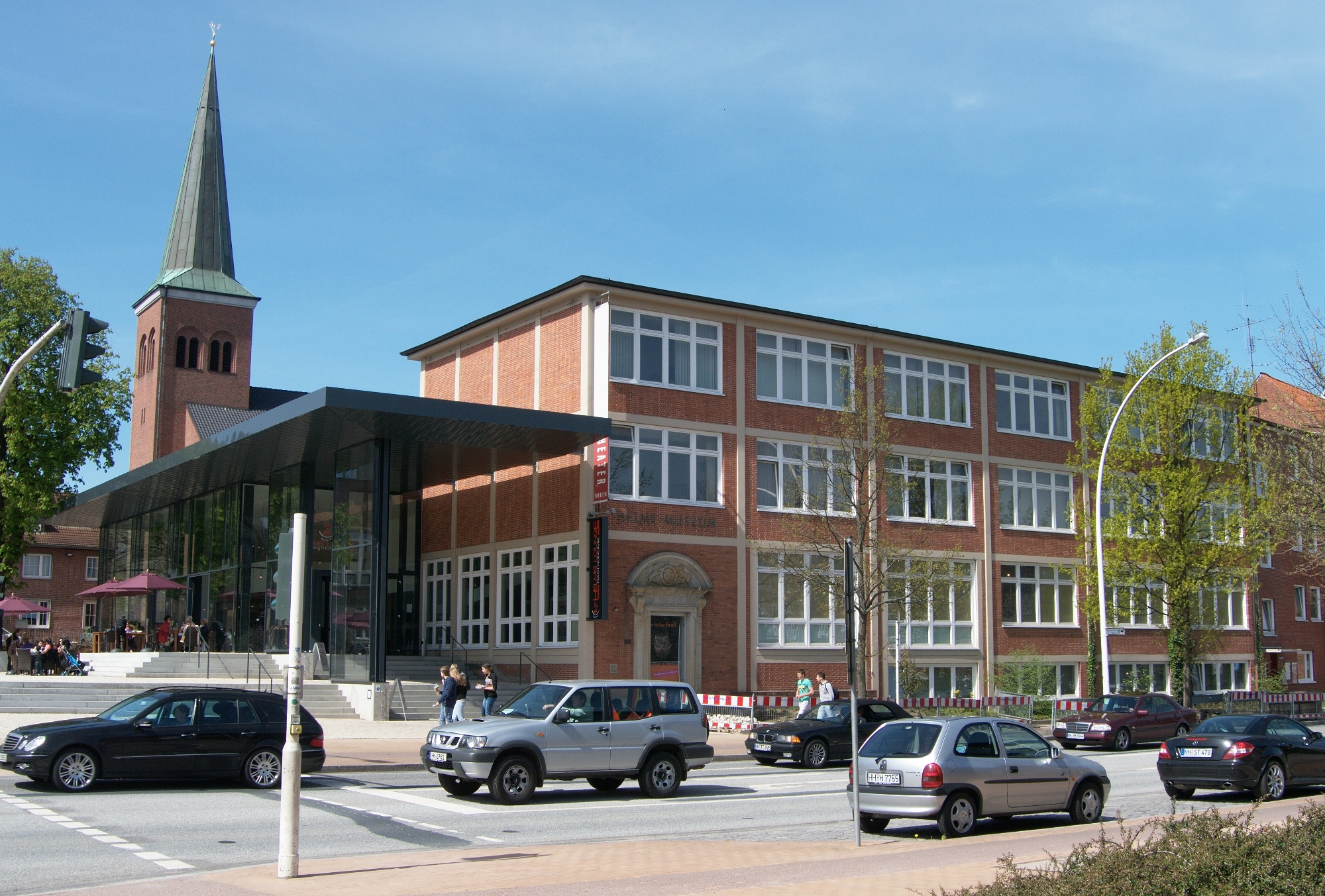
- Main building of the museum before 2009
- Interactive fullscreen map
- Established: 1898
- Location: Museumsplatz 2, 21073 Hamburg, Germany
- Coordinates: 53°27′33″N 9°58′38″E
- Type: Archaeology and history museum
- Collection size: over 2.5 million items
- Director: Rainer-Maria Weiss
- Curator: Michael Merkel
- Owner: Stiftung Historische Museen Hamburg
- Public transit access: "Harburg Rathaus" station on the Hamburg S-Bahn
- Website: amh.de

The Archäologisches Museum Hamburg (Hamburg Archaeological Museum; formerly the Helms-Museum) is an archaeological museum in the Harburg borough of Hamburg, Germany. It houses the archaeological finds of the city of Hamburg and the neighbouring counties to the south of the city. It focuses on northern German prehistory and early history as well as the history of the former city of Harburg. The museum is also home to the cultural heritage landmarks commission of the city of Hamburg and the adjacent district of Harburg in Lower-Saxony and thus supervises all archaeological undertakings in the region.

The museum has two major exhibition spaces. The future City Museum of Harburg, temporary exhibitions, the library, offices and small storage facilities are located in the main building, which is shared with the Harburger Theater at Museumsplatz 2. The permanent archaeological exhibition and education facilities are located nearby, at Harburger Rathausplatz 5. In addition, the Museum maintains as external branches the exhibition area of the 12th-century Bischofsturm (Bishop's Tower) in Hamburg's old town, the Fischbeker Heide archaeological trail at Neugraben-Fischbek and the 8th-century hillfort of Hollenstedt.

== Exhibition ==
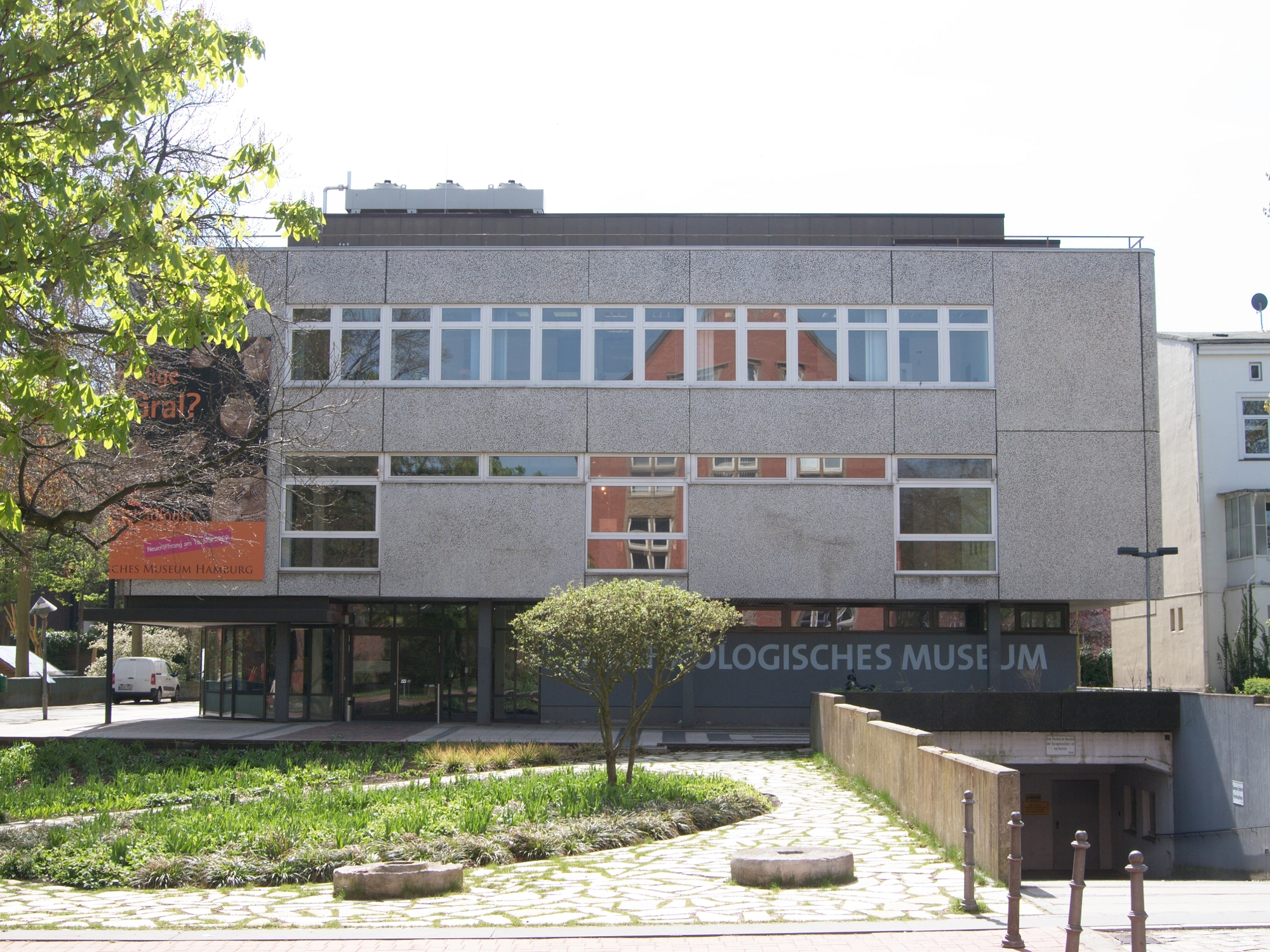
Archaeological exhibitions building

With more than 2.5 million objects, the museum holds the largest collection of prehistoric finds. On exhibit are mostly local examples of the Paleolithic and Neolithic eras, the Bronze and Iron Ages, the Migration Period and the Early Middle Ages in northern Germany. In 2009, the newly designed permanent archaeological exhibition opened. It is structured in the following subject areas: materials, food, violence, death, innovation and mobility. In more than 160 glass display cases, models and large exhibit items represent all aspects of human cultural development over the last 40,000 years. In addition, installations on cultural heritage landmarks, the archaeology of Hamburg, and methods of collection and preservation provide information about the work of the museum and archaeologists. Some of the notable exhibits are the Duvensee paddle (one of the oldest surviving paddles), the Metzendorf-Woxdorf head burial, the Bronze Age Daensen folding chair, the Ovelgönne Bread Roll, the Saxon Wulfsen horse burial, the Tangendorf disc brooch, a section of the Wittmoor Bog Trackway and the Maschen disc brooch.

A second permanent exhibition on the local history of the Harburg borough is due to be opened in the near future.

== History ==
The museum's foundation was initiated in 1898 by the Hamburg Senator August Helms, who was joined by other public figures in a museum association. Their aim was to create a museum for the then independent Prussian city of Harburg (Elbe) and their county. In 1925, the founder's sons deeded the museum a prestigious villa in Buxtehuder Straße to use as an exhibition hall, and the museum was renamed Helms-Museum. By that time, the collection already had more than 50,000 catalogued objects. In 1937, the Helms-Museum became a public institution. In 1955, the Museum left the villa, which had been damaged by a bomb in World War II, and moved to a new main building next to the Harburger Theater. In 1953, Director Willi Wegewitz initiated the open-air Museum am Kikeberg. In 1972, the Helms-Museum became Hamburg's only archaeological museum, and all archaeological holdings at other Hamburg museums were transferred to it. Since 1987, the museum has been entrusted with the preservation of cultural heritage landmarks. For space reasons, the archaeological permanent exhibition was moved to its present location at Harburger Rathausplatz. A third exhibition area was maintained from 1990 to 1999 at the old Harburg Fire Station. On 1 January 2008, the ownership of the Helms-Museum transferred to the Stiftung Historische Museen Hamburg (Foundation of Hamburg Historical Museums), and it was renamed Archäologisches Museum Hamburg - Helms-Museum. On 14 May 2009 the newly designed permanent archaeological exhibition was opened.

== Visitors ==
The museum participates in the Long Night of Museums of Hamburg, and offers a variety of educational programs for children and school classes. Since 15 November 2012 the Museum has provided an interactive electronic museum guide as an iTunes mobile app, also available for Android operating systems.

== See also ==
- List of museums and cultural institutions in Hamburg

== Literature ==
- Articus, Rüdiger; Brandt, Jochen; Först, Elke; Krause, Yvonne; Merkel, Michael; Mertens, Kathrin; Weiss, Rainer-Maria (2013). Archaeological Museum Hamburg Helms-Museum: A short guide to the Tour of the Times. Archaeological Museum Hamburg publication | Helms-Museum. Vol. 103. Hamburg. ISBN 978-3-931429-24-9.
