= Benefeld =

Coordinates: 52°54′16″N 9°37′47″E

Benefeld is part of the municipality of Walsrode in the Lower Saxon Heidekreis district in north Germany. Benefeld has a population of 2,232, although its parish covers just 2 km^{2} (as at 2008).

== Geography ==
=== Location ===
Benefeld lies in the southwestern Lüneburg Heath within the natural region of the Fallingbostel Loam Plateaus (Fallingbosteler Lehmplatten), an area characterised by very narrow valleys which roughly corresponds to the cultural region of the Heidmark. Together with the village of Bomlitz, 1 km to the east, Benefeld formed the heart of the former municipality of Bomlitz.

=== Neighbouring parishes ===
Its neighbouring villages - clockwise from the north - are Jarlingen, Bommelsen, Kroge, Bomlitz, Uetzingen and Hünzingen (all part of the town of Walsrode).

=== Rivers ===
The parish of Benefeld lies on the two largest tributaries of the River Böhme, the Bomlitz to the east and the Warnau to the west.

== History ==
The village of Benefeld coalesced from several industrial settlements and workers' camps and was named after the farm of Benefeld in the Bomlitz valley (its name probably meant "field of bones"). These settlements were built after 1935, as part of the expansion of the Bomlitz explosives industry (forerunner of today's Dow Wolff Cellulosics) on the plateau of Lohheide, favourable because of its height above the water table. The factory facilities of Eibia & Co., which were partly underground, have now been largely levelled and the site is once again a recreation area. Besides being home to Eibia's workers' accommodation, in the fall of 1944 for six weeks, Benefeld was also a satellite of the Bergen-Belsen concentration camp, with about 750 women.

Since its merger into its parent municipality in 1968 the hitherto independent parish of Benefeld has been one of eight others subordinate to the municipality of Bomlitz.

== Infrastructure ==
Benefeld has a community centre, where facilities are available for cultural and social clubs to meet and hold events.

=== Transport ===
Benefeld lies away from regional communication routes. The B 27 autobahn runs past 9 km to the southwest, the A 7 8 km to the southeast. The B 440 federal road from Dorfmark via Visselhövede to Rotenburg (Wümme) runs to the northeast, about 3 km away.
