= Kroge (Walsrode) =

Coordinates: 52.923967°N 9.694053°E

Kroge is a village in the town of Walsrode in North Germany. It lies in the Lower Saxony district of Soltau-Fallingbostel. The village has 290 inhabitants and an area of 7 square kilometres (2.7 sq mi).

== Geography ==
=== Location ===
Kroge lies in the northeastern part of the former municipality of Bomlitz, 3 km northeast of Bomlitz itself.

=== Neighbouring villages ===
Its neighbouring villages are - clockwise from the north - Bommelsen, Riepe, Bomlitz, Benefeld, Jarlingen and Ahrsen.

=== Rivers ===
The Bomlitz flows through Kroge and discharges further south into the Böhme.

== History ==
Since the land reform of 1974 the formerly independent parish of Kroge has become one of the eight villages in Bomlitz parish.

== Infrastructure ==
=== Transport ===
==== Road ====
Kroge lies right on the B 440 federal highway that runs from Dorfmark via Visselhövede to Rotenburg (Wümme). The A 27 motorway passes 12 km away to the southwest, and the A 7 4 km to the southeast.
