= Warnau (river) =

River in Germany

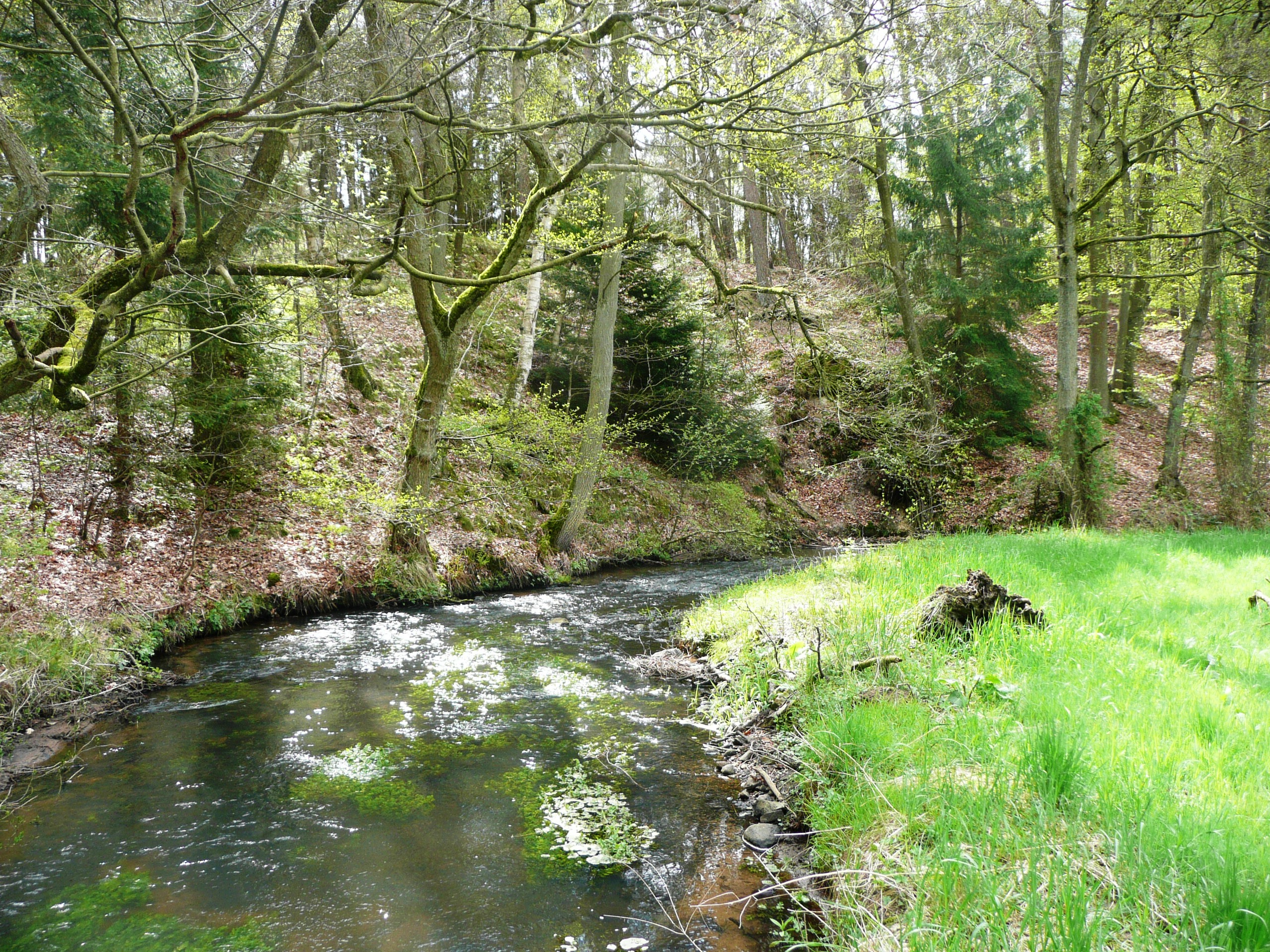
- The Warnau at Borg (Bomlitz)

Location
- Country: Germany
- State: Lower Saxony

Physical characteristics
- Source
  - location: east of Visselhövede
  - coordinates: 52°58′49″N 9°38′57″E
  - elevation: 68 m above sea level (NN)
- Mouth
  - location: north of Walsrode
  - coordinates: 52°52′41″N 9°36′34″E
  - elevation: 38 m above sea level (NN)
- Length: 13.9 km (8.6 mi)
- Basin size: 51 km^{2} (20 sq mi)

Basin features
- Progression: Böhme→ Aller→ Weser→ North Sea
- Landmarks: Villages: Ottingen, Ahrsen, Jarlingen, Benefeld, Borg

Warnau (German pronunciation: [ˈvaʁnaʊ]) is a river of Lower Saxony, Germany.

The Warnau is a right-bank tributary of the River Böhme and part of the Weser basin. It is about 14 kilometres (8.7 mi) long and has a catchment area of 51 square kilometres (20 sq mi), mostly in the Heidekreis district.

The Warnau rises in the area of Behningen near Neuenkirchen, flows generally southwards from the village of Ottingen, passes Ahrsen, Jarlingen, Benefeld and Cordingen and discharges into the Böhme south of Borg in the municipality of Walsrode. Near Ottingen the Warnau is also called the Schneebach, which comes from the fact that the stream once formed the border (Low German: Sneede) between the Bishopric of Verden and the Duchy of Lüneburg, now the district boundary between Heidekreis and Rotenburg. Between Cordingen and Benefeld it forms a charming, narrow, wooded valley with a restored mill, the Cordinger Mühle, that hosts events. Downstream to its mouth the meadow valley is accompanied on one side by a picturesque bluff with narrow footpath. At its southern end the path meets the Bomlitz Archaeological Trail (Archäologischen Wanderpfad Bomlitz), which runs through a Bronze Age burial site on a rounded hilltop in the recreation area of Eibia-Lohheide and continues south to the street Vogelparkstraße to the impressive system of ramparts belonging to the Old Saxon fort of Hünenburg at the confluence of the Warnau and the Böhme. The site is linked by legend to the founding of the oldest Lüneburg Heath's monasteries, the nearby Walsrode Abbey.

The Walsrode–Visselhövede railway follows the Warnau valley, which has now been dismantled north of Cordingen (with its old station of Jarlingen). The section south of Cordingen is now the Bomlitz–Walsrode railway which is worked by goods trains to the factory of Wolff and the Walsrode Industrial Park in Bomlitz. This line crosses the Warnau on a high bridge between Cordingen and Benefeld.

== See also ==
- List of rivers of Lower Saxony

== Sources ==
- Topographische Karte 1:25.000, Blatt 3123 „Walsrode“. (Hrsg.: Landesvermessung und Geobasisinformation Niedersachsen), Hannover 2002 (1. Auflage); ISBN 3-89435-220-5
