= Bommelsen =

Human settlement in Germany

Coordinates: 52°56′45″N 9°41′25″E

Bommelsen is a village in the town of Walsrode in North Germany. It lies in the Lower Saxon Heidekreis district. The parish has about 286 inhabitants and an area of 10 km^{2}.

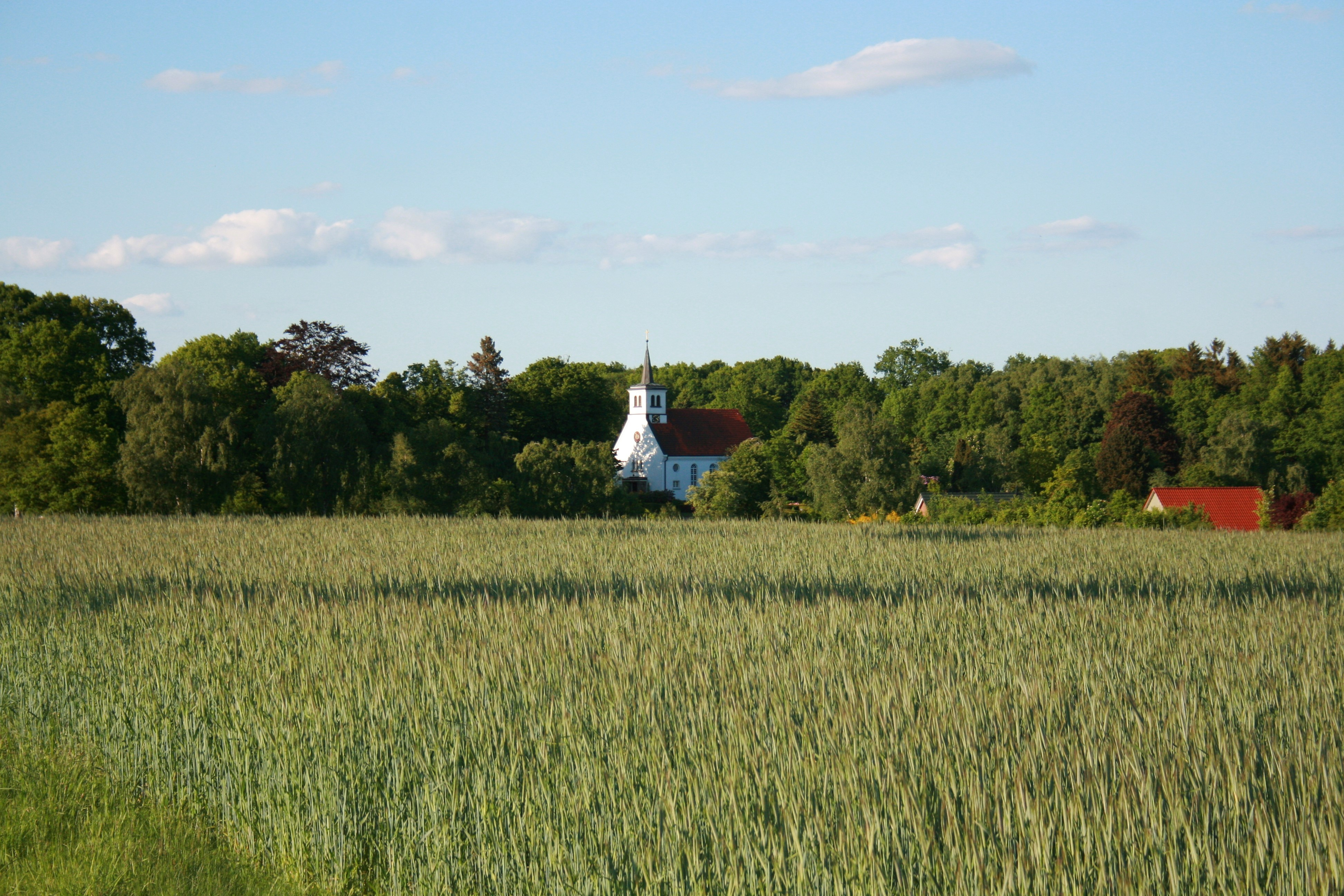
View over Bommelsen (right: the Bomlitz valley) and the Friedenskirche

== Geography ==
=== Location ===
Bommelsen lies in the northern part of the parish of Bomlitz, a good 5 km from Bomlitz itself. The village sprawls for about 1.5 km mainly along the right bank of the middle reaches of the Bomlitz valley. The Northern Low Saxon name for the Bomlitz, Bommelse, gave its name to the village.

=== Neighbouring communities ===
The neighbouring communities are – clockwise from the north – Woltem, Riepe, Kroge, Benefeld, Jarlingen and Ottingen.

== History ==
Bommelsen was first mentioned in the records in 835 as Bamlinestade (which roughly means: bank of the Little Böhme) as belonging to the estates of Corvey Abbey. It then appears in 1120 as Bomlose and from 1390 as Bommelsen. Since the land reform of 1974 the hitherto independent parish has been one of 8 villages in the parish of Bomlitz.

== Buildings and infrastructure ==
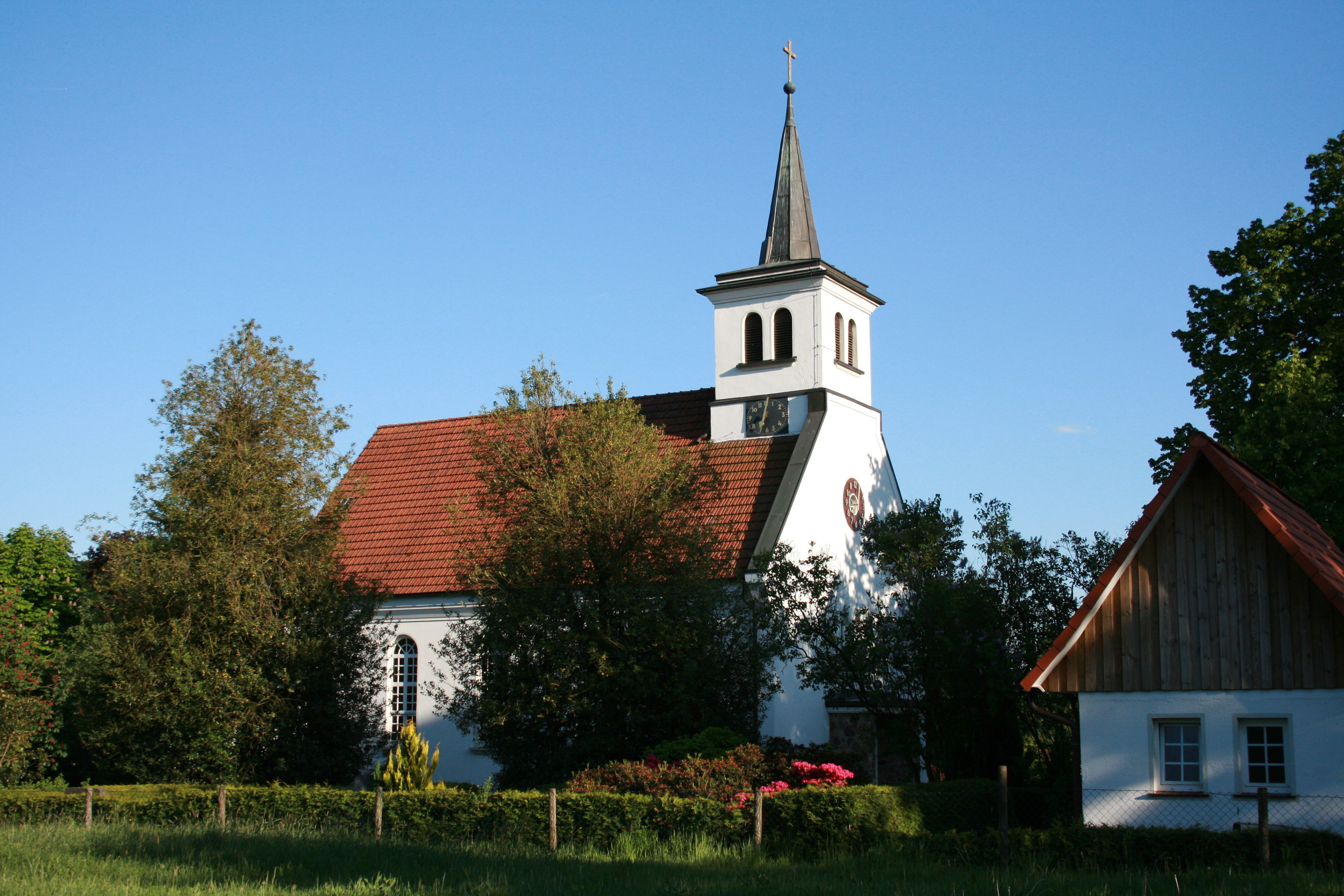
The Friedenskirche church from the north

Several farmsteads and hamlets along the River Bomlitz have been preserved as typical groups of buildings, some including historic Treppenspeicher storage barns. The landmark of the village is the Friedenskirche (Church of Peace) of 1929/1930, which was built on the initiative of Bommelsen's villagers and gave Bommelsen its own church parish and pastor for a long time. The Friedenskirche is well known as a postcard motif and is often used for weddings. In the village community centre, formerly Bommelsen's village school, rooms are available for events run by local clubs and for other cultural and social activities.

=== Transport ===
Bommelsen lies some way from the main transport routes. The A 27 motorway passes 14 km to the southwest, and the A 7 9 km to the southeast. The B 440 federal road from Dorfmark via Visselhövede to Rotenburg (Wümme) grazes its southern boundary.
