= Bomlitz (river) =

River in Lower Saxony, Germany

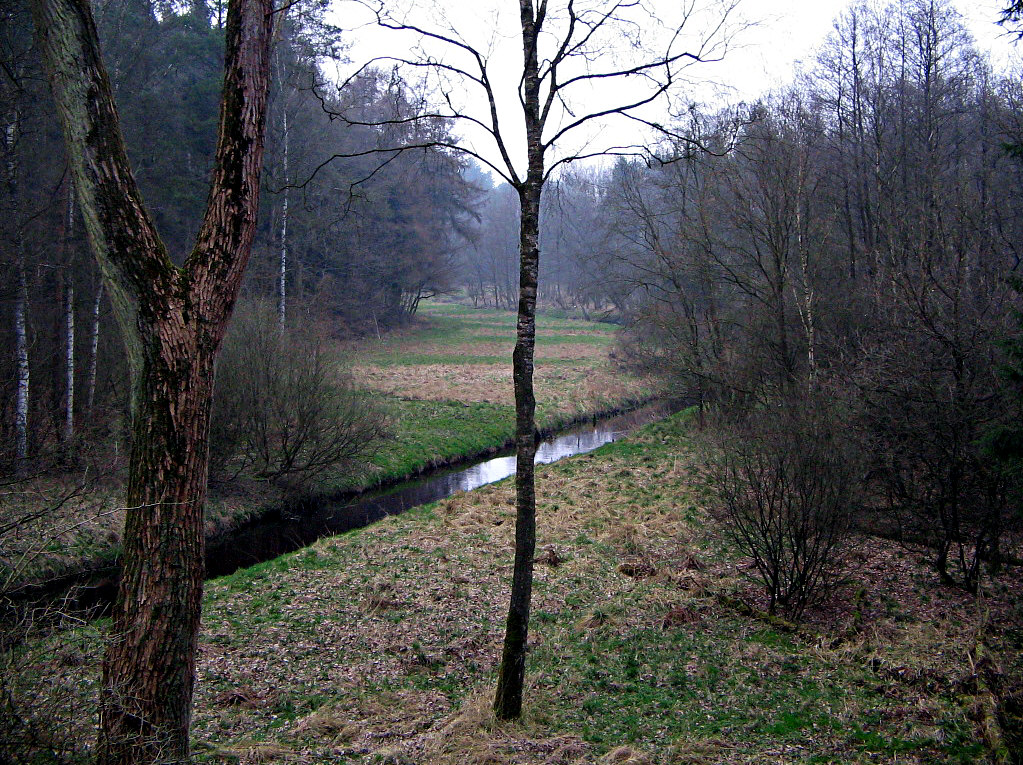
- The Bomlitz valley in the tourist region of Eibia-Lohheide near Bomlitz

Location
- Country: Germany
- State: Lower Saxony

Physical characteristics
- Source
  - location: Stichter See near Neuenkirchen (Lüneburg Heath)
  - coordinates: 53°00′32″N 9°41′52″E
  - elevation: ca. 76 m above sea level (NN)
- Mouth
  - location: near Uetzingen (Walsrode) into the Böhme
  - coordinates: 52°53′02″N 9°38′05″E
  - elevation: ca. 33 m above sea level (NN)
- Length: 17.9 km (11.1 mi)
- Basin size: 69 km^{2} (27 sq mi)
- Discharge
  - average: ca. 0.7 m^{3}/s

Basin features
- Progression: Böhme→ Aller→ Weser→ North Sea
- Landmarks: Small towns: Soltau (village of Woltem); Villages: Bomlitz
- Population: ca. 6000
- Tributaries
  - left: Riesbach
- Waterbodies: Lakes: Stichter See

The Bomlitz (German pronunciation: [ˈbɔmlɪts]) is a right-bank tributary of the River Böhme in North Germany. It is just under 18 kilometres (11 mi) long and runs through the Heidekreis district in Lower Saxony.

== Name ==
The Bomlitz is known in the local dialect as the Bommelse, a word originally derived from Bamlina meaning Kleiner Baumfluss ('Little Baum River'), because it was the main tributary of the Böhme, formerly known as the Bama or Bumen meaning Baumfluss ('tree river'). Its present name is taken from the village of Bomlitz, whose name comes from its location on the right-angled bend of the valley known as the Bommel-Etz.

== Course ==
The Bomlitz rises between Neuenkirchen and Soltau in the Stichter See, which was formed during the last ice age as a Schlatt (locally: Flatt) or wind-formed, heath lake with no outlet. Today it has largely silted up, but in 1900 it was the largest natural lake in the Lüneburg Heath with an area of 6 hectares (15 acres). It has a small natural beach.

As it makes its way through the almost unpopulated Riensheide heath the ditch-like brook constantly loses water into the porous subsoil and to the ground water that seeps towards the neighbouring stream of the Hahnenbach, 20 metres below it to the north.

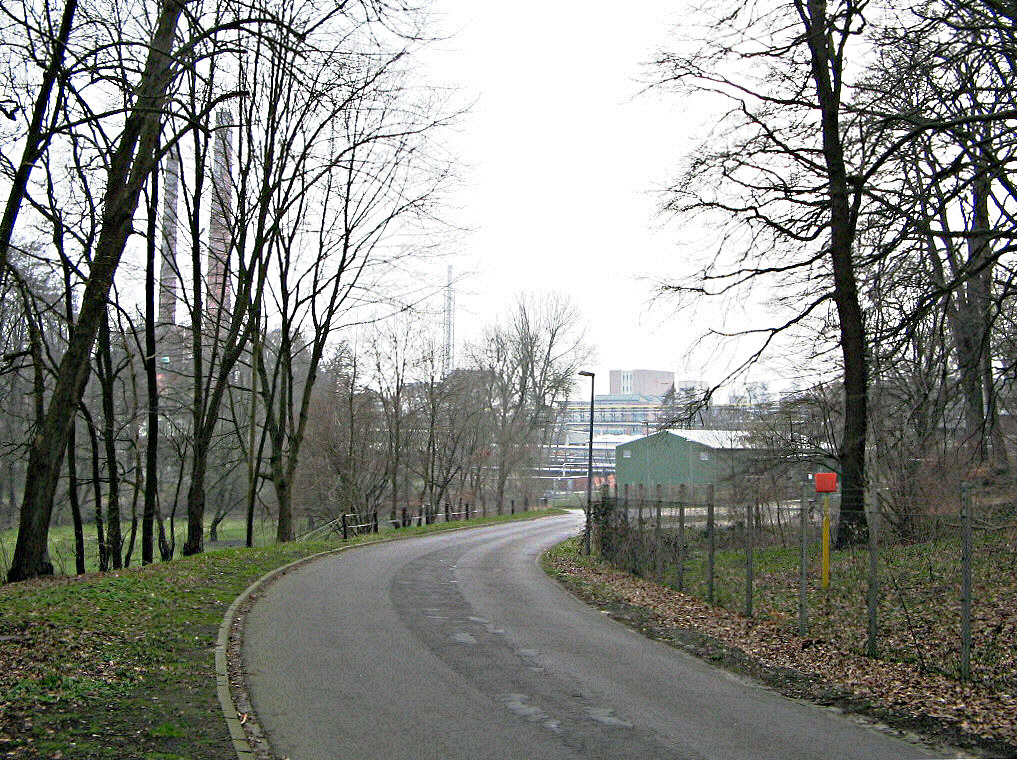
The Bomlitz valley and the Altwerk Wolff

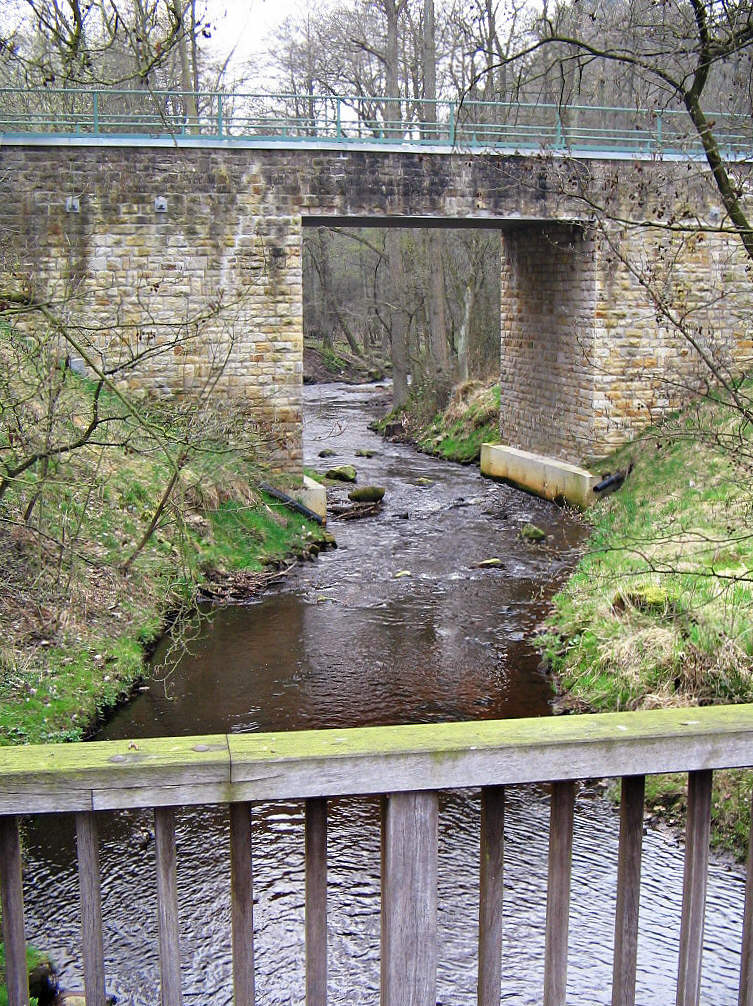
The Bomlitz between Bomlitz and Benefeld

South of the point where it is crossed by the Uelzen–Langwedel railway, part of the America Line, in the area of Frielingen and Woltem in Soltau borough, and Bommelsen and Kroge in Bomlitz parish, the Bomlitz valley gradually deepens, forming a textbook example of a former cultural landscape in the natural region of the Fallingbostel loam plateaus. There is a succession of farmsteads and hamlets close to the river, each one of which lies on a route crossing the river between the country roads on either side of the valley bottom. The sometimes well-preserved and historic Treppenspeicher-surrounded farmyards are hidden in small stands of old deciduous trees, surrounded by arable fields and, further away, by pastureland. The fields were cultivated by peat cuttings or Plaggen from the heathlands on their outskirts and turned into productive Eschflur field systems. The often once boggy heathlands are today largely wooded.

Above the village of Bomlitz the valley narrows. Here the river meanders through near-natural riparian woods and old millponds, that were laid out for the old Bommelse paper mill (in 1691) and, later, for the gunpowder factory (in 1815). It then flows through the old Bomlitz estate and then, for two kilometres, through the factory facilities of Dow Wolff Cellulosics, one of the largest and oldest chemical industrial sites in Lower Saxony. The factory terrain is divided by steep banks. The sprawling settlement of Bomlitz climbs the left bank, not unlike the village of Benefeld further downstream which perches on the right bank.

Below the bridge of the Wolff industrial siding the slope gets steeper, and the stream passes through the former out-of-bounds area and present-day recreational area of Lohheide. The ruins of the old ammunition factory run by Eibia between 1938 and 1945 are still visible in places, partly as piles of rubble, partly as embankments which used to be part of an installation with over 250 buildings integrated into the rough terrain. Here the Bomlitz forms what, for the North German Plain, is an unusual, very striking series of meanders with river banks up to 20 metres high. The narrow strips of former valley meadow have degenerated into an alder carr apart from a few less waterlogged places. The course of the stream has been canalised since about 1850, but was renaturalised in places. In the triangle formed by the settlements of Walsrode, Bad Fallingbostel and Bomlitz the stream enters the Böhme at a point dominated by the ruins of a partially blown-up railway bridge.

== Water quality ==
Above Bomlitz the river was and is slightly to moderately polluted. Until the construction of the large sewage farm jointly operated by the firm of Wolff (today: Walsrode Industrial Park) and the parish of Bomlitz, the river below the Wolff factory was one of the most heavily polluted in Lower Saxony. Three small, mechanical sewage works could not prevent the Bomlitz from transporting noticeably heated, cloudy, grey-green water that only provided a habitat for bacteria and whose strong, chemical smell made the environment of the river bank unpleasant. In the decades before 1945 the variable acidity of the river killed off fish several times in the Böhme and, occasionally, in the Aller as well.

Until the construction of the sewage farm the water was rated as having the highest levels of pollution. Since then however its water quality has improved to acidity class II-III, but other parameters are less favourable. Its smell and appearance are generally normal, so that its charming valley is now heavily frequented by tourists.

== See also ==
- List of rivers of Lower Saxony

== Sources ==
- Geowissenschaftliche Karte des Naturraumpotentials von Niedersachsen und Bremen 1: 200.000, CC 3118, Teil 4 - Grundwasser-Grundlagen, Hannover, 1981
- Topographische Karte 1:25.000, Blätter 2924 Neuenkirchen, 3024 Dorfmark, 3123 Walsrode and 3124 Fallingbostel (Hrsg.: Landesvermessung und Geobasisinformation Niedersachsen), Hannover ISBN 3-89435-220-5
- Matthiesen, H.: Geheime Reichssache Eibia, Walsrode, 1987
- Mußmann, O.: Selbstorganisation und Chaostheorie in der Geschichtswissenschaft: Der Beispiel des Gewerbe- und Rüstungsdorfes Bomlitz 1680-1930. Leipzig, 1998
- Seedorf, H.H.: Walsrode, Fallingbostel und das mittlere Böhmetal im Jahre 1778. Erläuterungen zum Blatt 89 Walsrode der Kurhannoverschen Landesaufnahme des 18. Jahrhunderts (Distribution: Landesvermessung and Geobasisinformation Niedersachsen), Hannover, 1986
- Stuhlmacher, H.: Heimatbuch des Kreises Fallingbostel. Magdeburg, 1935
