= Uetzingen =

Village in North Germany

Coordinates: 52.883309°N 9.6533°E

Uetzingen is a village in the town of Walsrode in North Germany. It lies in the Lower Saxon district of Heidekreis. The village has 462 inhabitants and its parish covers an area of 10 km^{2}.

== Geography ==
=== Location ===
Uetzingen is the southernmost village in the former municipality of Bomlitz, 2 km south of Bomlitz itself. The hamlets of Elferdingen and Wenzingen belong to Uetzingen.

=== Neighbouring parishes ===
The neighbouring parishes are - clockwise from the north – Benefeld, Bomlitz, Bad Fallingbostel, Honerdingen, Hünzingen and Cordingen.

== History ==
Since the land reform of 1974 the hitherto independent parish of Uetzingen has been one of 8 villages in the parish of Bomlitz.

== Infrastructure ==
=== Transport ===
Uetzingen lies some distance from the major transport routes. The A 27 motorway is 7 km away to the southwest, and the A 7 passes 6 km away to the southeast. The B 440 federal road from Dorfmark via Visselhövede to Rotenburg (Wümme) runs by to the northeast, 5 km away.
