= Fulde (Böhme) =

River in Germany

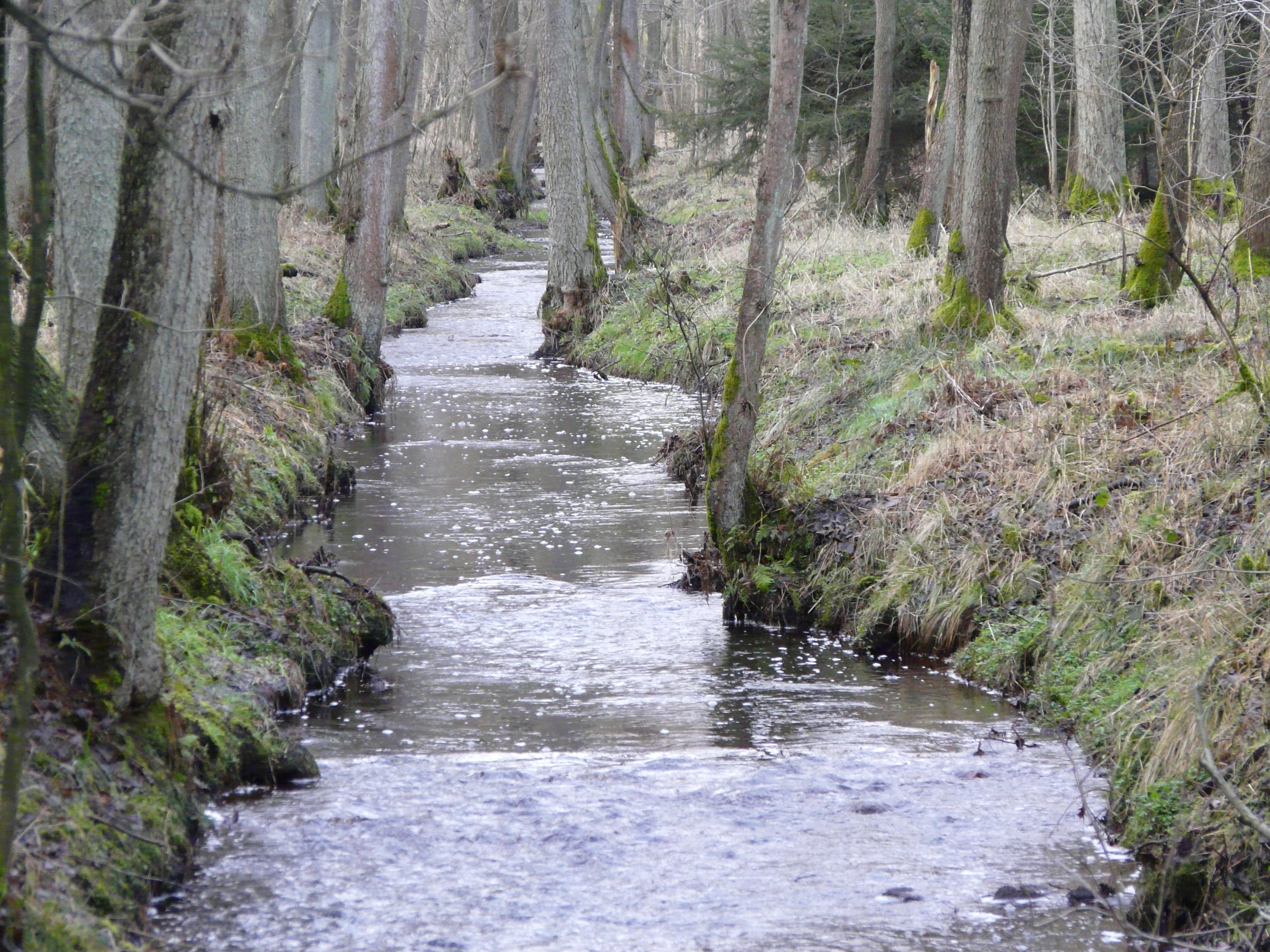
- The Fulde in Eckernworth woods

Location
- Country: Germany
- State: Lower Saxony
- District: Heidekreis

Physical characteristics
- Source
  - location: near Walsrode-Ebbingen
  - coordinates: 52°54′16″N 9°33′19″E
  - elevation: 73 m above sea level (NN)
- Mouth
  - location: in Walsrode into the Böhme
  - coordinates: 52°51′21″N 9°35′48″E
  - elevation: ca. 30 m above sea level (NN)
- Length: 11 km (6.8 mi)
- Basin size: 31.2 km²

Basin features
- Progression: Böhme→ Aller→ Weser→ North Sea
- Landmarks: Large towns: Walsrode
- Population: ca. 7000

The Fulde (German pronunciation: [ˈfʊldə]) is a river of Lower Saxony, Germany.

It belongs to the Weser river system. It is about 11 kilometres (6.8 mi) long and flows entirely within the territory of the borough of Walsrode (Heidekreis district. It rises in a valley between two parallel end moraines formed in the Saalian Ice Age. By far the largest source drains the Grundloses Moor ("bottomless moor"), 4 kilometres (2.5 mi) north of Fulde and emerges from the Kleiner See ("Little Lake") there. Another source appears 2.5 kilometres (1.6 mi) northwest of the village of Fulde, which gave the stream its name. From there the Fulde runs through, at times, picturesque scenery between steep, grass-covered, clay banks and fish ponds south of the Walsrode town forest of Eckernworth, where the Rischmannshof Heath Museum is located, crosses the centre of the town through the Fulde Park with its town hall and joins the River Böhme south of the Walsrode Abbey lake.

== See also ==
- List of rivers of Lower Saxony

== Literature ==
- Topographische Karte 1:25000, Blatt 3123. (Hrsg.: Landesvermessung und Geobasisinformation Niedersachsen), Hannover 2002 (1. Auflage); ISBN 3-89435-220-5
