= Bremervörde–Walsrode railway =

Railway line in Germany

Bremervörde-Walsrode railway
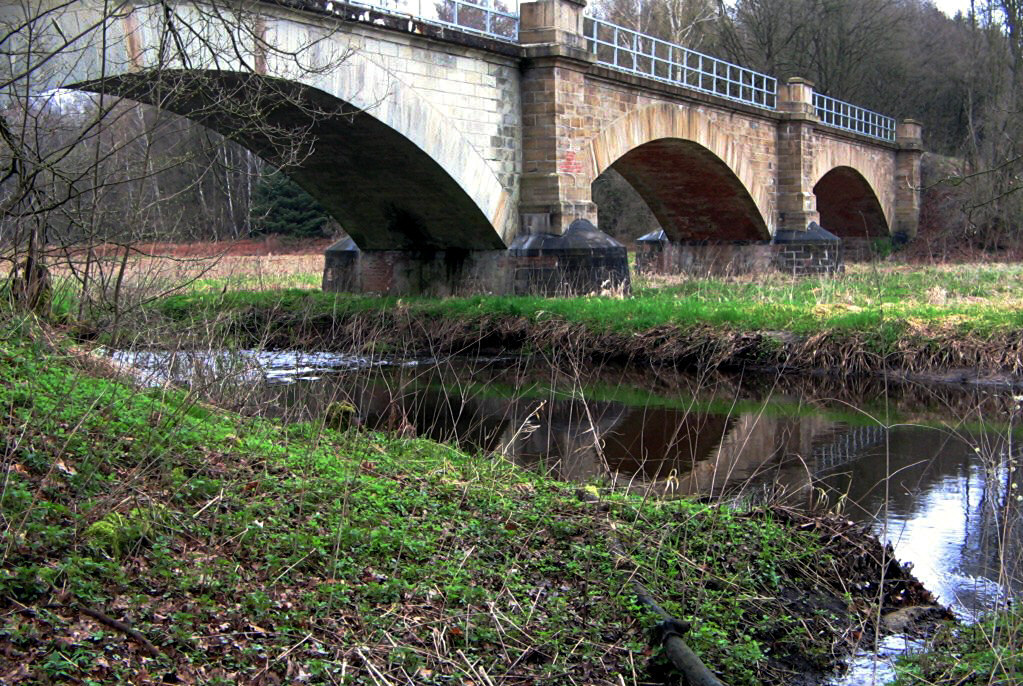
- Bremervörde–Walsrode railway

Overview
- Line number: 1711

Service
- Route number: ex 217 g

Technical
- Track gauge: 1,435 mm

The Bremervörde–Walsrode railway was a railway route of regional importance in the German state of Lower Saxony. It linked Bremervörde via Zeven, Rotenburg (Wümme) and Visselhövede to Walsrode. Passenger trains were divided in Rotenburg. Originally the link was conceived as part of a long-distance through route from Hanover to Geestemünde, but long-distance trains never worked the line.

== History ==
=== Early years ===
The first sections of the railway, those between Bremervörde and Zeven and between Visselhövede and Walsrode were opened in 1890. The Walsrode – Visselhövede stretch was initially a continuation of the southern section of the Heath Railway from Hanover to Walsrode. The gaps between Rotenburg via Brockel to Visselhövede and from Zeven to Rotenburg were opened in 1906. The route played an important role in opening up the region, in transporting agricultural goods, in school traffic, and also for tourism. During the Nazi era deportation trains worked the line to the Nazi concentration camps at Bergen-Belsen and Sandbostel.

=== Withdrawal of passenger services ===
The Rotenburg–Visselhövede section was closed to passenger traffic on 1 June 1958, the last services being just a daily pair of trains in the form of railbuses. Other parts of the route between Brockel and Visselhövede were dismantled when it was closed in 1963. This initially affected the Brockel–Wittorf stretch, which is nowadays a cycle path. In 1979 the line from Wittorf to Visselhövede was also lifted. The southern section from Visselhövede to Cordingen was the last of the three sections to be closed, in 1980, Passenger trains still ran occasionally from Walsrode via Cordingen to Bomlitz. The Visselhövede–Cordingen has now been lifted as well.

=== Takeover by the EVB ===
Although passenger services between Bremervörde and Rotenburg ceased on 29 September 1968, there continues to be a lively amount of goods traffic on the line. The remaining tracks between Bremervörde, Rotenburg and Brockel were transferred in 1991 from the Deutsche Bundesbahn into the ownership of Elbe-Weser Railways and Transport Operations (Eisenbahnen and Verkehrsbetriebe Elbe-Weser) or EVB. Their goods trains work the route between Bremervörde and Rotenburg; traffic on the Rotenburg–Brockel section was withdrawn on 31 December 2002, only potatoes being transported here in its last years. Following the derailment of a goods train in the area where the route branches in Rotenburg the turnout was removed, so that the Brockel branch is no longer accessible and increasingly overgrown by vegetation. In July 2008 work on dismantling the tracks was started here too.

== Route ==
=== Bremervörde–Rotenburg (Wümme) section ===
The railway, on which the legendary steam locomotive Heini traveled to the surrounding villages, still exists today but is only worked by goods traffic. After leaving the Bremerhaven – Hamburg route, which is still used by passenger trains, it heads southwards into a region of sprawling geest countryside with numerous pine woods, running parallel to the B 71 through Bevern, Deinstedt, Selsingen, past the former concentration camp at Sandbostel, through Seedorf and Godenstedt to Zeven. At the northern edge of the town, it passes under the Wilstedt-Zeven-Tostedt railway. Immediately south of the station at Zeven (Han) there is a turnout to the station of Zeven Süd on the former narrow gauge line (Kleinbahn) which, like the line described here, also belongs to the EVB. South of Zeven an industrial line branched off to Aspe until it was lifted at the end of 2007 before the line continued on its way through the geest country. Running past Elsdorf with its dairy, Gyhum, Mulmshorn, Bötersen, where a track to Rotenburg barracks branches off, and Waffensen, it reaches the bridge over the Rollbahn. Immediately behind this bridge, the aforementioned railway merges with the Weser-Aller railway from the south into the Rotenburg track system, which is approached from the west. The route from Bremervörde to Rotenburg(Wümme) is used mainly for goods traffic nowadays: container trains from Bremerhaven to Hamburg and back, trains for moving construction material to Zeven, and Bremervörde and log trains operated by the East Hanoverian Railways to Stendal work this line.

=== Rotenburg (Wümme)–Visselhövede section ===
Until the introduction of railbuses a steam-hauled passenger train known as Fidi ran from here to the surrounding villages with coaches known colloquially as Donnerbüchsen. Leaving Rotenburg station in an easterly direction, the route to Visselhövede branched to the southwest away from the Rollbahn after the bridge over the Wümme. There used to be a siding to the Rotenburg public utilities, but it has now been dismantled. In front of the level crossing on Harburger Straße near the Roman Catholic church, there is a large hypermarket today. Until the 1990s there was a goods station here for a local agricultural cooperative and the old wayside stop of Rotenburg Harburger Straße, which was in service in the 1950s for a short time.

The route continued southwest as straight as a die through a wild geest and forest landscape. The old halt of Hemsbünde was located in front of a level crossing with the B 71. South of the crossing there was a siding to the window and door manufacturers of HBI. The route swung around to the south for 3 kilometres. In this curve between the villages of Bothel and Brockel was the station of Brockel. For a long time, it was the terminus of the route until the tracks were lifted. Here, in addition to the old station building, there were several loading sidings for an agricultural cooperative, wooden toy manufacture, and a former station restaurant. The tracks ended in front of an old bridge over the Wiedau stream.

From here a cycle path runs on the old trackbed which runs south past Bothel. Near the state forest of Trochel the route is crossed by an old bridge, over which a field and woodland track run. In addition, the line crossed several small streams and more tracks at old level crossings. In the area of the village of Bretel, there is an old signalman's cabin by a former level crossing. An old platform edge, today a picnic site, witnesses to the former halt at Bretel. The trackbed continues southwards to Wittorf. Here the cycle path ends at the former request stop of Wittorf Ost. Wittorf station follows after about a kilometre. Today it is a private residence, but until 1979 there were loading sidings similar to those at Brockel.

South of the old station the old trackbed has now been built over. The route crossed the B 440 road, before heading west on an embankment, which is relatively high for the area, to the village of Nindorf. Here for a short time, a halt was operated which was parallel to Rotenburg Harburger Straße. The route passed under the Uelzen–Langwedel railway almost at right angles. It then ran in a sharp left curve in order to enter Visselhövede station from the west together with the "America Line".

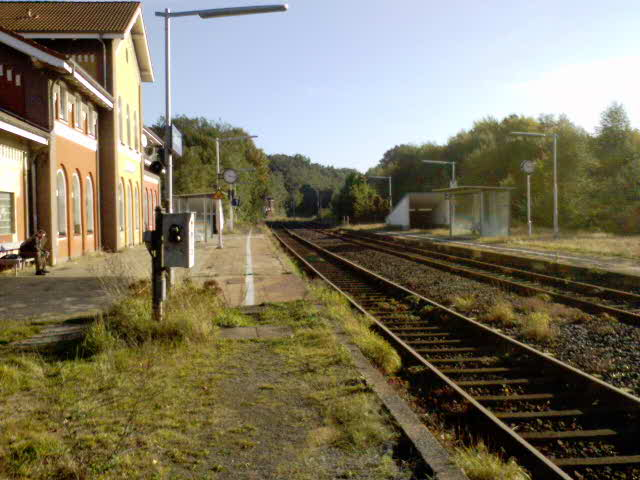
Visselhövede station today. The tracks of the Rotenburg–Walsrode line now lie amongst the bushes on the right.

=== Visselhövede–Walsrode section ===
This section held onto its passenger services longer than the other parts of the line. The line left Visselhövede station heading east, together with the America Line. The route to Walsrode swung south in a sharp curve. After passing through a forested region the railway reached the next station at the little village of Jarlingen. The station lay to one side of the village where there was a level crossing for a country lane. Today the trackbed has been built on. The route ran on to the south to the station of Cordingen. This station was sometimes served by passenger trains on the Bomlitz–Walsrode railway. Today there are still tracks, the station's exit to Visselhövede has also survived, but the tracks end after just 100 metres. South of Cordingen, the route runs through the gently rolling countryside near the Walsrode Bird Park. From the east it is joined by the Heath Railway from Bad Fallingbostel and both routes then run together into Walsrode station from the north.
