= Ettenbostel =

Coordinates: 52°47′34″N 9°42′21″E

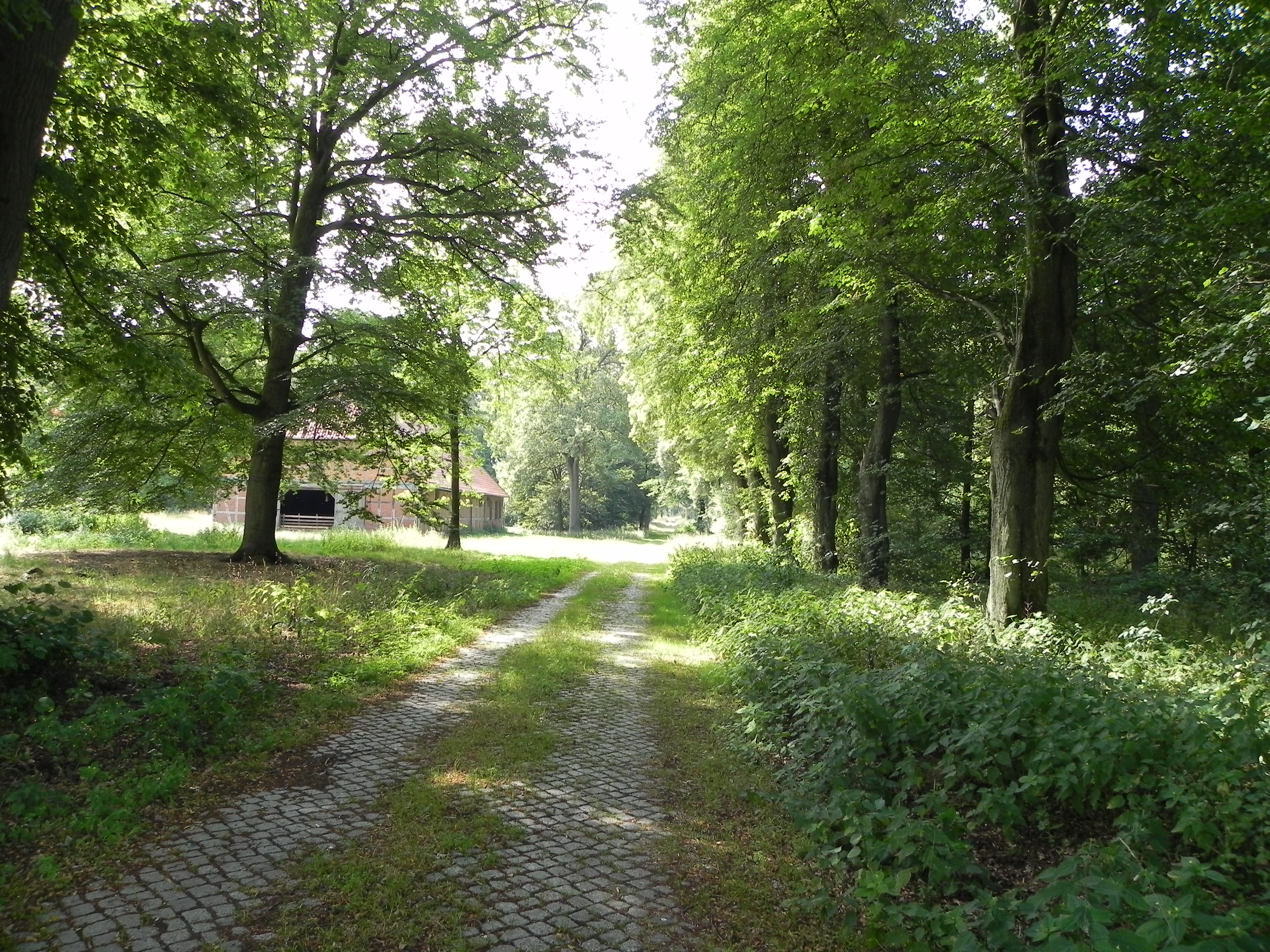
Old village street in the former village of Ettenbostel

Ettenbostel was a village in the old district (Altkreis) of Fallingbostel located in the Heidmark in the north German state of Lower Saxony. The villagers were 'relocated' in 1935/36 because the German Wehrmacht wanted to create a huge military training area on the heathland and forest of the Heidmark. Today this has become the Bergen-Hohne Training Area and is the largest in Europe.

== History ==
Ettenbostel was once called Ettingeborstelde and was first mentioned in the year 1218 in deed no. 9 of the abbey at Walsrode. Its old name is translated as "farmers of Etto", it was therefore a family settlement. In the Celle treasury register (Schatzregister Celle) five farms are recorded at this place.

The heath farmers and their wives ensured their survival by keeping hardy moorland sheep, known as Heidschnucken. Not until the hardpan could be broken, enabling the cultivation of arable land, did sheep farming decline.

The area around Ettenbostel is described in local lore as the "most beautiful ancient heathland" in the old district of Fallingbostel. At the time of the resettlement there were 173 inhabitants living in Ettenbostel and the neighbouring village of Benhorn.

== Sources ==
- Hinrich Baumann: Die Heidmark - Wandel einer Landschaft. Geschichte des Truppenübungsplatzes. Bergen 2006
- Hans Stuhlmacher: Die Heidmark. Schneeheide 1939
