= Böhme (river) =

River in Germany

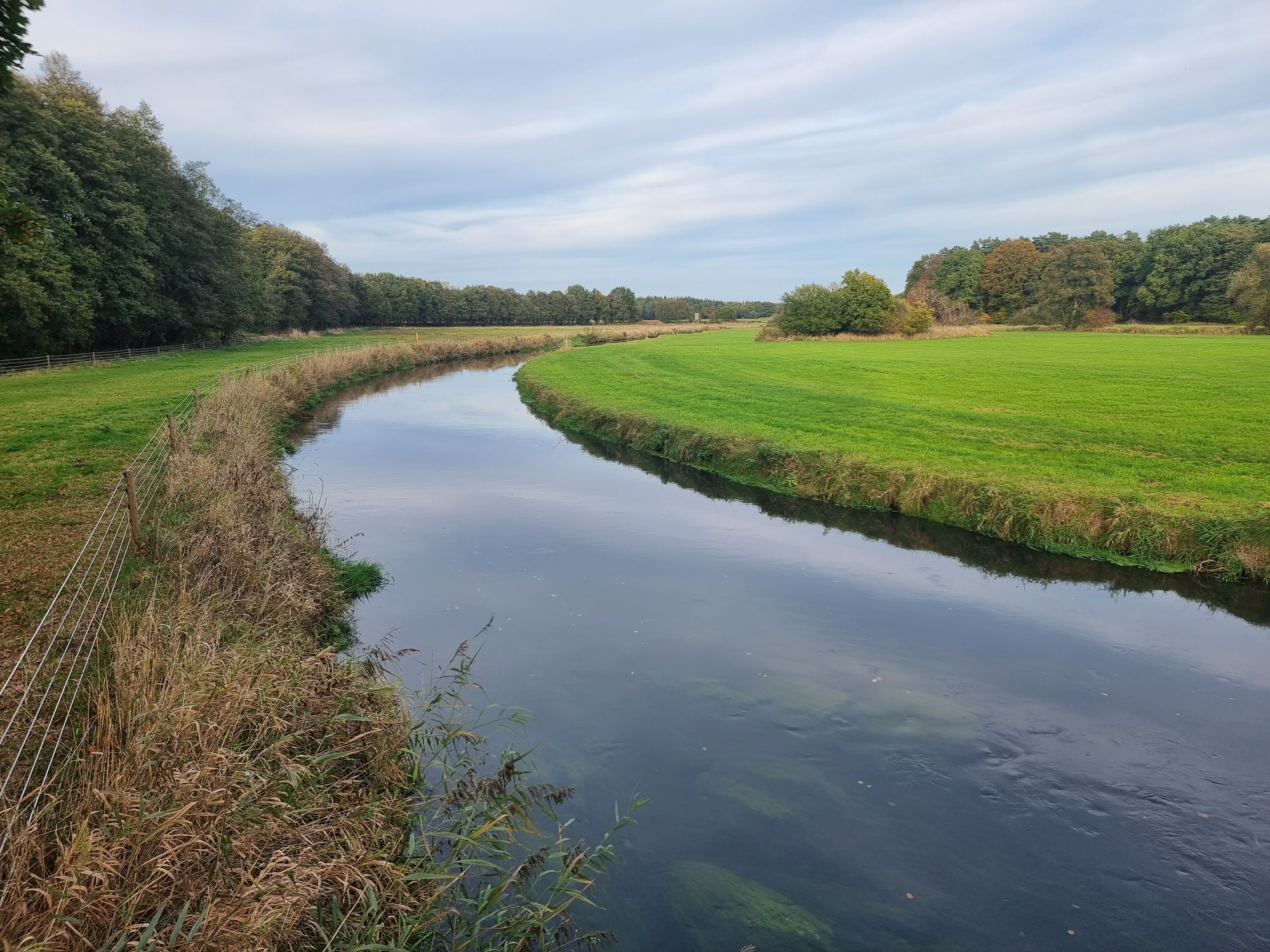
- The middle reaches of the Böhme valley (above Bad Fallingbostel)

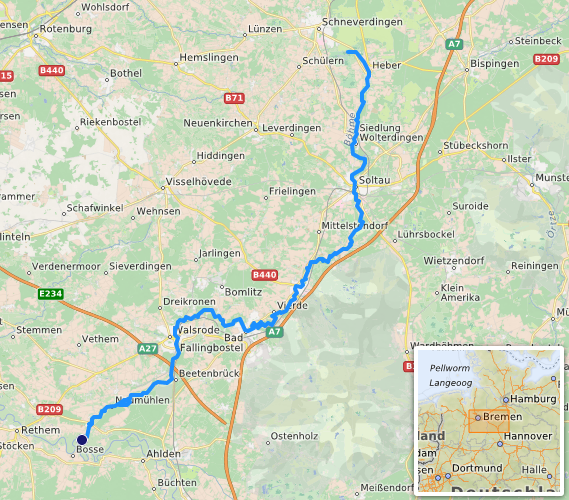
- Path of the River Böhme

Location
- Country: Germany
- State: Lower Saxony
- District: Heidekreis

Physical characteristics
- Source
  - location: in the Pietzmoor south of Schneverdingen
  - coordinates: 53°5′54″N 9°50′31″E
  - elevation: 81 m above sea level (NN)
- Mouth
  - location: between Ahlden and Rethem into the Aller
  - coordinates: 52°46′35″N 9°28′3″E
  - elevation: 18 m above sea level (NN)
- Length: 72.1 km (44.8 mi)
- Basin size: 562 km^{2} (217 sq mi)

Basin features
- Progression: Aller→ Weser→ North Sea
- Landmarks: Large towns: Soltau, Walsrode; Small towns: Bad Fallingbostel; Villages: Böhme
- Tributaries
  - left: Haesbeck, Große Aue, Kleine Aue, Forellenbach, Fischendorfer Bach, Steinbach, Oerbker Bach, Steinförthsbach
  - right: Rönnebeck, Steertbeck, Soltau, Jette, Bomlitz, Warnau, Rieselbach, Fulde, Jordanbach

The Böhme (German pronunciation: [ˈbøːmə]) is a right-bank, northeastern tributary of the Aller in the district of Soltau-Fallingbostel in the north German state of Lower Saxony. The river is 72 kilometres (45 mi) long.

== Course ==
The Böhme rises on the southwestern edge of the Lüneburg Heath Nature Park in the Pietzmoor. It flows mainly in a southwesterly direction through the district of Soltau-Fallingbostel losing 61 m in height.

The Böhme leaves its source region southwest of the town of Schneverdingen and heads south, passing through the town of Soltau about 15 kilometres (9.3 mi) later. It then runs close to the northwestern boundary of the Bergen-Hohne Training Area and through the centres of Dorfmark and Bad Fallingbostel. Above Walsrode it forms the Böhme Knee (Böhmeknie), which strikes out to the northwest, before finally swinging southwest to reach the Aller a little below the small village of Böhme between Ahlden and Rethem.

== Descriptions ==
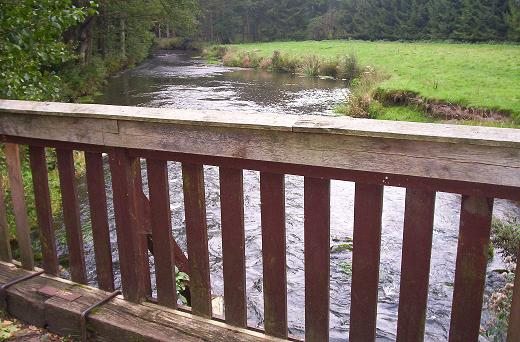
The Böhme near Vierde

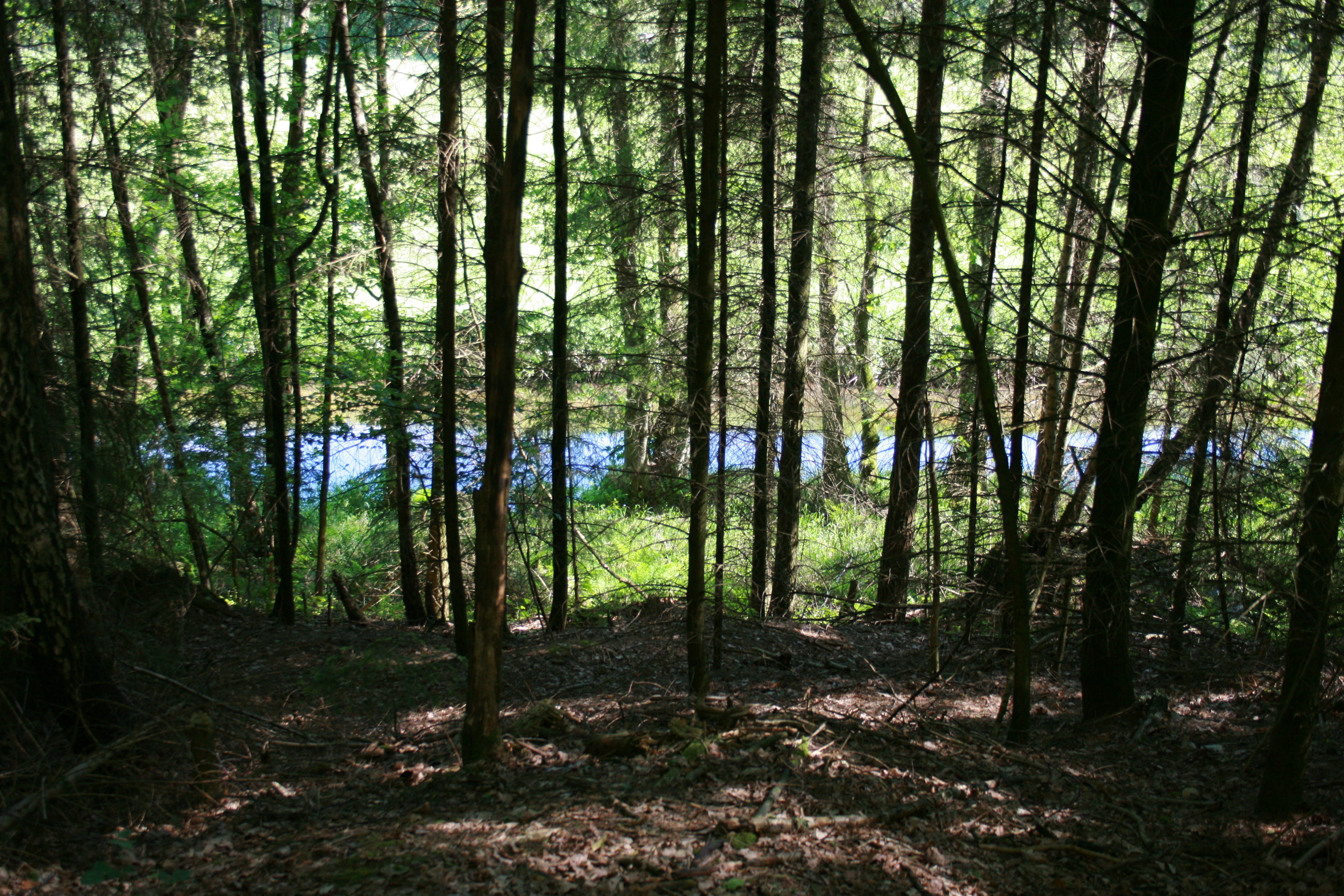
The Böhme on the Tietlinger Wacholderhain near Honerdingen

The Böhme is the westernmost of the large rivers in the Southern Heath or Südheide. Unlike the others, however, it flows through a relatively narrow valley in its middle reaches between Dorfmark and Walsrode, the highest points of which are the 40 m high bluffs of the Fallingbostel Lieth. It had already begun to attract tourists by the end of the 19th century and its popularity is reflected in local names such as the Honerdingen Switzerland (Honerdinger Schweiz) - now unrecognisable due to sand quarrying - and Böhme Gorge (Böhmeschlucht). It initially formed a single landscape unit with the small ridge of the Falkenberg end moraine, the dolmens of the Sieben Steinhäuser and the old resort of Achterberg, today inside the Bergen-Hohne Training Area. Today it is still dominated by tourism, especially visitors to the Walsrode Bird Park and the grave of Hermann Löns in Walsrode, the largest town in the Böhme valley.

This region, also called the Heidmark has a denser population than the surrounding area, partly because of the more fertile soils on the local loam heathland, but importantly due to early industrialization in Bomlitz (on the Böhme tributary of the same name).

The upper reaches of the valley are broad and typical of the southern Lüneburg Heath. Here the Böhme rises from several old peat pits in the re-flooded Pietzmoor near Schneverdingen. The main settlement on the upper river is the road and railway hub of Soltau, a town of similar centrality as Walsrode and well known as a tourist destination because of the Heide Park north of the town.

Below Walsrode the valley broadens suddenly into the Aller glacial valley with a densely wooded, sandy floodplain resembling an alluvial fan. The water quality is good being Class II: moderately polluted almost throughout.

== Economy and transport ==
The current economic development of the Böhme valley is mainly based on its accessibility to the three-way motorway interchange at Walsrode at the intersection of the catchment areas of Bremen, Hamburg and Hanover, which is convenient for logistic firms and tourist traffic, and also on industry, mainly in Bomlitz (Industriepark Walsrode, Dow Wolff Cellulosics) and Bad Fallingbostel (the main depot for Kraft Foods in Europe).

The course of Böhme is followed at a short distance by the A7 motorway, the B209 federal road and since 1890 by the Heath Railway. It is crossed by railway lines of lesser importance such as the Uelzen–Langwedel railway, part of the so-called America Line, and the Bomlitz–Walsrode railway.

== Towns and villages ==
The towns and villages on the Böhme include:

- Heber
- Wolterdingen
- Soltau
- Dorfmark
- Vierde
- Bad Fallingbostel
- Uetzingen
- Honerdingen
- Walsrode
- Böhme

The river gave its name to the proposed town of Böhmetal, which was to have been formed from the Bomlitz, Bad Fallingbostel and Walsrode in 2011, before the plans came to nothing.

== Tributaries ==
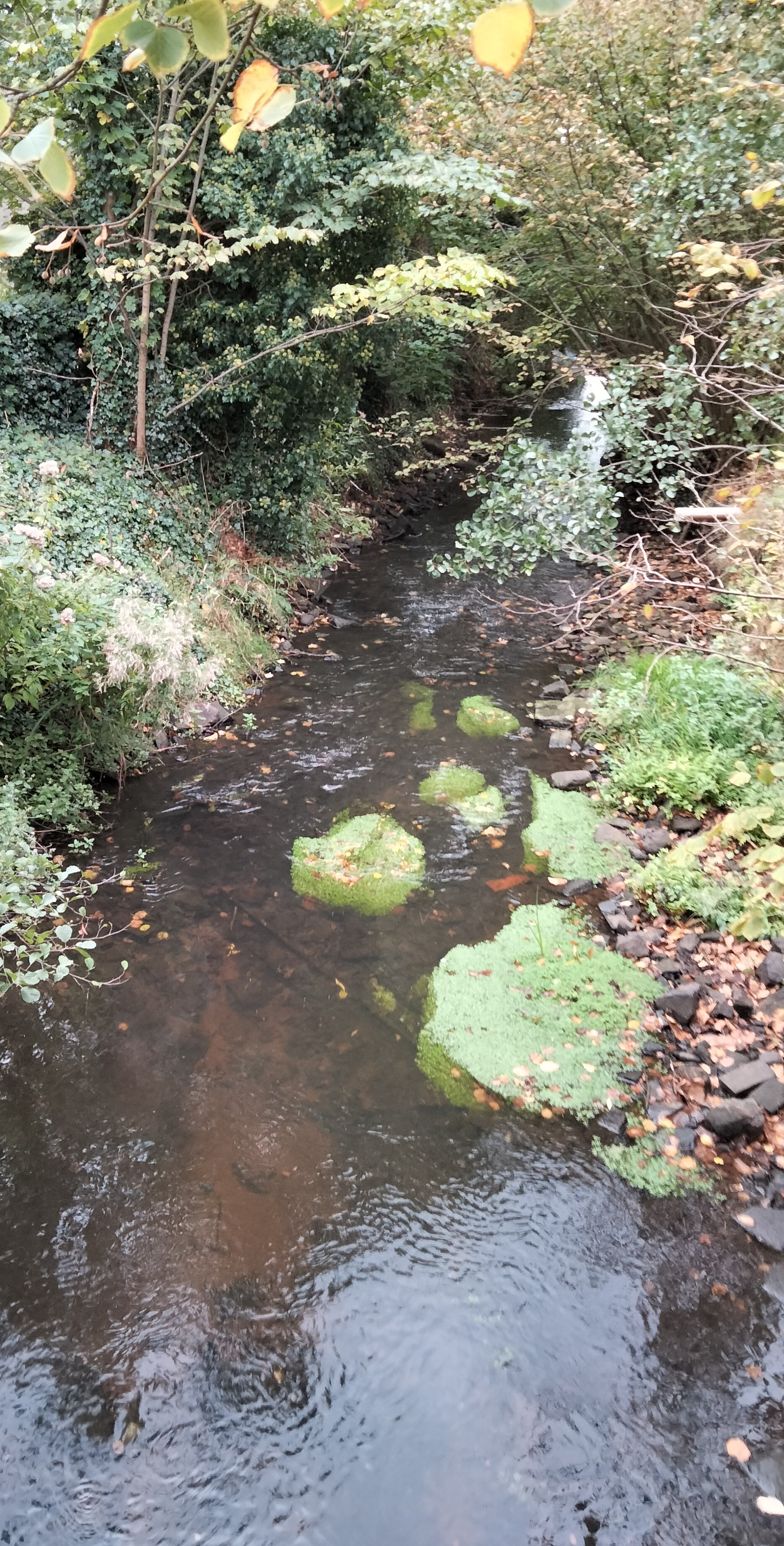
River Soltau in the centre of Soltau town at Marktstrasse

- Soltau (joins from the right in the centre of Soltau)
- Große Aue (flows through the Heide Park near Soltau and enters from the left south of Soltau into the only slightly larger Böhme)
- Fischendorfer Bach (drains the highest parts of the Falkenberg end moraine and joins from the left on the southern edge of the village of Dorfmark)
- Steinbach (enters from the left down a channel resembling that of an interlocked, mountain stream)
- Bomlitz (largest tributary of the Böhme, merges from the right in the Eibia-Lohheide resort between Bomlitz and Walsrode)
- Warnau (second largest tributary, joins 1 km below the Bomlitz from the right on the Borger Burg after a picturesque section with steep banks)
- Rieselbach (flows through the Walsrode Bird Park and enters from the right)
- Fulde (drains the Grundloses Moor and discharges into Böhme in Walsrode south of the Klostersee)
- Jordanbach (drains the large Vehmsmoor and joins from the right near Altenboitzen)

== See also ==
- List of rivers of Lower Saxony
