= Kim Schoen =

American photographer and artist

Kim Schoen is a photographer and artist from Los Angeles. She received her Master's in Philosophy in Photography at the Royal College of Art, London (2006–2007) and an MFA in Photography from the California Institute of the Arts in Valencia, California. She is the co-founder and editor of MATERIAL Press. Her work has been displayed at Kunstverein Springhornhof in Neuenkirchen, Germany; Madison Museum of Contemporary Art in Wisconsin; Focal Point Gallery UK; Maraya Art Centre in Sharjah UAE; LAXART in Los Angeles; the MOT International Projects in London and more.

Schoen has lectured about photography and visual interpretation at Otis College of Art & Design, Goldsmiths, CCA, The Royal College of Art and The School of Visual Arts.

Schoen lives and works in Los Angeles, California and Berlin, Germany.

== Recognition ==
2007 Artist Residency at the Cité internationale des arts, Paris

2007 Selected for the Artist pension Trust in Los Angeles

2007 Winner of the RCA Society Thames & Hudson Art Book Prize

2012 CCI/ARC Grant Recipient
