= Bomlitz =

- Village of Walsrode
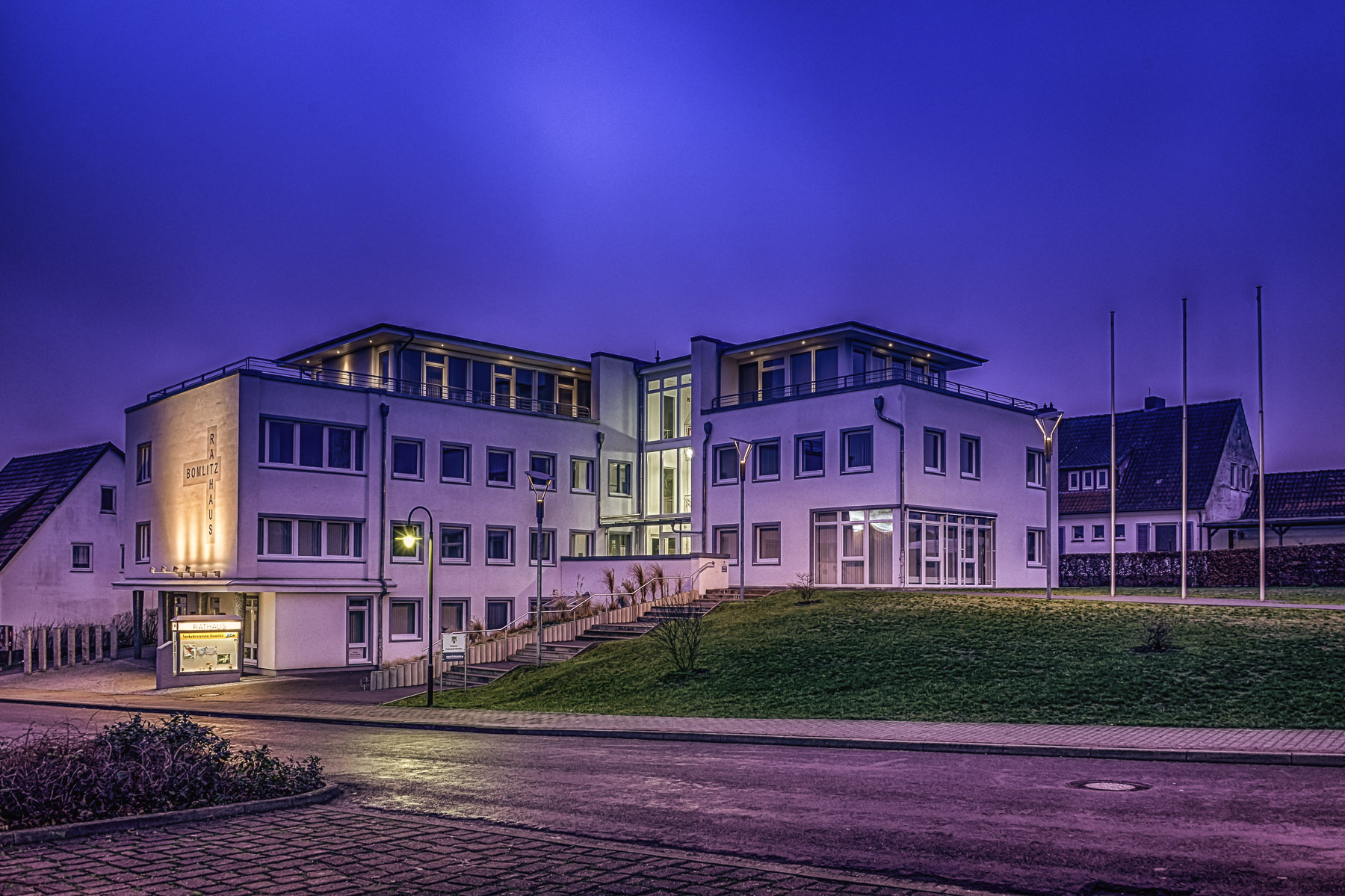
- Town hall

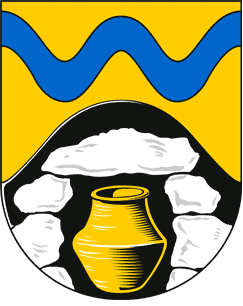
- Coat of arms
- Interactive map of Bomlitz
- Location within Germany Location within Lower Saxony
- Coordinates: 52°53′N 9°39′E
- Country: Germany
- State: Lower Saxony
- District: Heidekreis
- Town: Walsrode
- Subdivisions: 8 districts

Area
  - Total: 64.17 km^{2} (24.78 sq mi)
- Elevation: 59 m (194 ft)
- Time zone: UTC+01:00 (CET)
  - Summer (DST): UTC+02:00 (CEST)
- Postal codes: 29699
- Dialling codes: 05161
- Vehicle registration: SFA/HK
- Website: www.bomlitz.de

Bomlitz (German pronunciation: [ˈbɔmlɪts]) is a village and a former municipality in the Heidekreis district, in Lower Saxony, Germany. On 1 January 2020, it was merged into the town Walsrode.

== Geography ==
=== Location ===
Bomlitz lies on the Lüneburg Heath in a heavily wooded area. The two rivers, Bomlitz and Warnau run through the municipality.

=== Parishes ===
The municipality of Bomlitz comprised eight localities (Ortschaften): Ahrsen, Benefeld, Bomlitz, Bommelsen, Borg, Jarlingen, Kroge and Uetzingen.

== History ==
In the fall of 1944, a short-lived satellite camp of Bergen-Belsen concentration camp operated at Bomlitz-Benefeld. Guarded by SS staff, around 600 women were forced to work at the Eibia GmbH gunpowder works.

== Politics ==
=== Municipal council ===
The municipal council (Gemeinderat) of Bomlitz consists of 20 councillors and the mayor (Bürgermeister) who is from the SPD party.

- CDU 8 seats
- SPD 12 seats

(as at the local elections on 10 September 2006)

- Mayor: Michael Lebid

=== Twin towns ===
- Kępice, Poland
- Blainville sur Orne, France.

=== Parks ===
Nearby is the Walsrode Bird Park. It is one of the largest bird parks in the world with an area of 240,000 m^{2}. About 4,000 birds of over 700 different species live on the site.

=== Natural monuments ===
In the Eibia local recreation area there are several pre-Christian tumuli.

=== Sport ===
There are 2 large sports clubs in Bomlitz:

- SG Bomlitz-Lönsheide

The Bomlitz-Lönsheide Sports Club (Sportgemeinschaft Bomlitz-Lönsheide) was formed by the merger of Bomlitz Sports Club (Sportverein Bomlitz) and the Uetzingen-Honerdingen Sports Club (Spielgemeinschaft Uetzingen-Honerdingen). The club has 14 specialisations (including football, handball, cycling and swimming).

- SG Benefeld-Cordingen

The Benefeld-Cordingen Sports Club (Sportgemeinschaft Benefeld-Cordingen) has almost 1,200 members and offers a similarly broad spectrum of sports (including football, handball, gymnastics, walking and, since its merger with the Tennisclub Blau-Weiss Bomlitz in 2010, tennis as well).

- Bomlitz has a heated open-air swimming pool with a 50-metre pool, diving board and non-swimmer's and small children's pools.

== Sources ==
- Olaf Mußmann: Bomlitz. Perspektiven der Geschichte. Geiger, Horb am Neckar 1989; ISBN 3-89264-305-9
- Olaf Mußmann: Komplexe Geschichte. Systemtheorie, Selbstorganisation und Regionalgeschichte. Von der Papiermühle zur Pulverfabrik. Ein historischer Längsschnitt der Gemeinde Bomlitz. Universität, Dissertation, Hanover 1994
- Olaf Mußmann: Selbstorganisation und Chaostheorie in der Geschichtswissenschaft. Das Beispiel des Gewerbe- und Rüstungsdorfes Bomlitz 1680–1930. Leipziger Univ.-Verlag, Leipzig 1998; ISBN 3-933240-10-7
- Thorsten Neubert-Preine: Bomlitz. Von der Papiermühle zur Großgemeinde. Herausgeber Stiftung Geschichtshaus Bomlitz, Rückblende Nr. 5, Mai 2010
