= Grundloses Moor =

Coordinates: 52°54′12.54″N 9°33′0.48″E

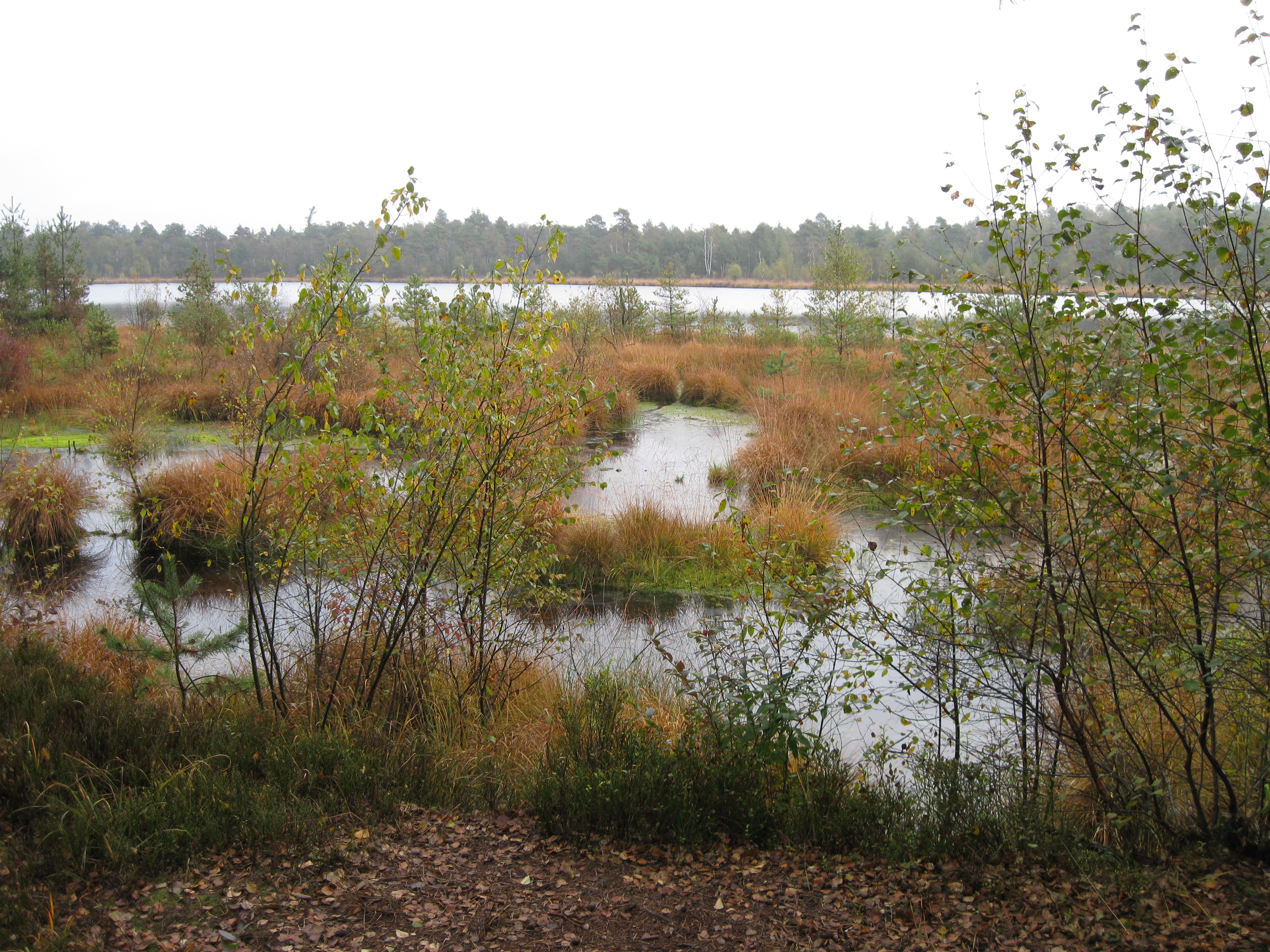
Quaking bog in the Grundloses Moor

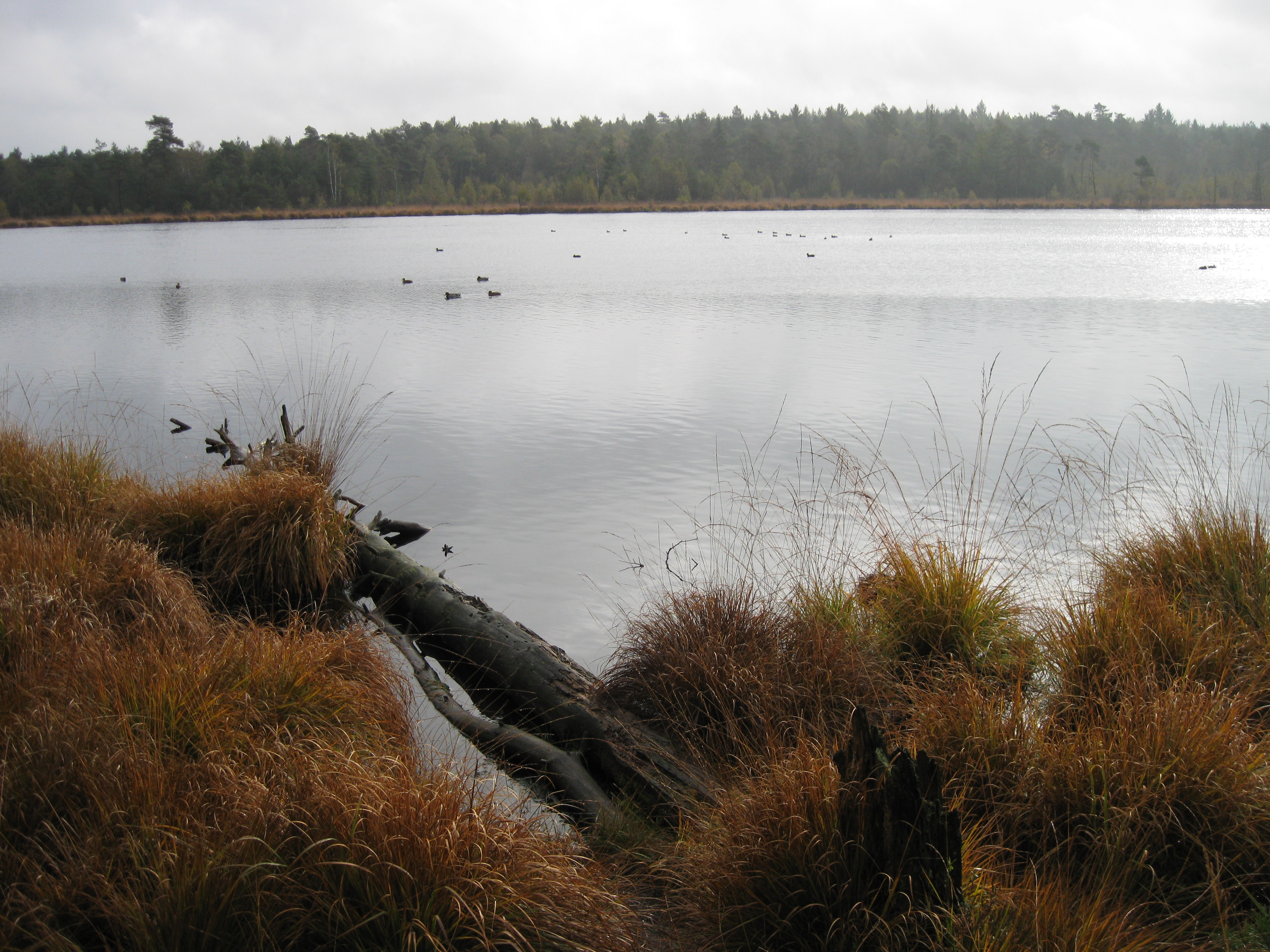
Grundloser See (lake)

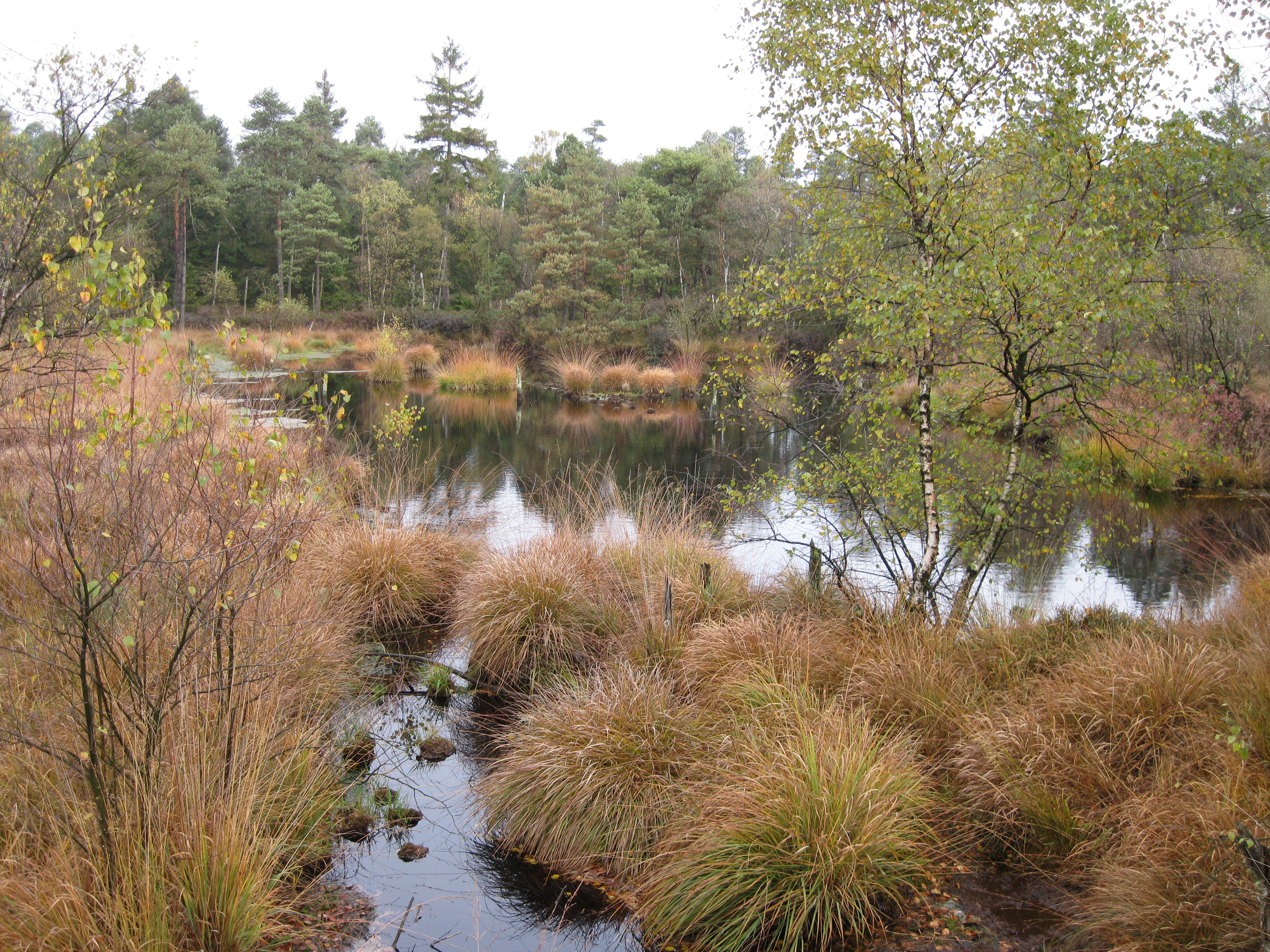
Old peat cuttings

The Grundloses Moor (literally: "Bottomless Bog") is the largest, virtually intact raised bog in the district of Heidekreis and a nature reserve in Walsrode in the German state of Lower Saxony.

== Description ==
The reserve has an area of 295 hectares (730 acres) and lies about 1.5 km west of the village of Ebbingen, 3.5 km north of the village of Fulde and five km northwest of the town of Walsrode.

In the centre of the moor is the 2.5 metre deep lake Grundloser See, which is 435 metres long from north to south, and 160 metres wide in its northern part. It has an area of 4.7 hectares (12 acres) and lies at 72.5 metres (238 ft) above mean sea level. Roughly 400 metres to the northeast lies the Kleiner See ("Little Lake") with a diameter of about 60 metres.

== History ==
The moor was formed in the northeastern half of a 4-kilometre-long depression enclosed by two parallel end moraines which were deposited during the Saalian glaciation. It is drained by a ditch that acts as the upper course of the Fulde. The Grundloser See was originally a residual ice age lake that had almost silted up. However, since then it has become a bog pond as a result of the build-up of peat moor and other processes.

== Flora ==
The Grundloses Moor nature reserve is dominated by cottongrass, cranberries, bilberries, peat moss and cross-leaved heath. It was formerly used for peat cutting, especially in the south, but has regenerated itself after measures to raise the water levels were introduced.

== Access ==
It is possible to walk around the lake close to its shore setting out from hikers' car parks to the east (Ebbingen) and south (north of the Fulde). The lake is not suitable for bathing.
