= Lilo Wanders =

German transvestite actor

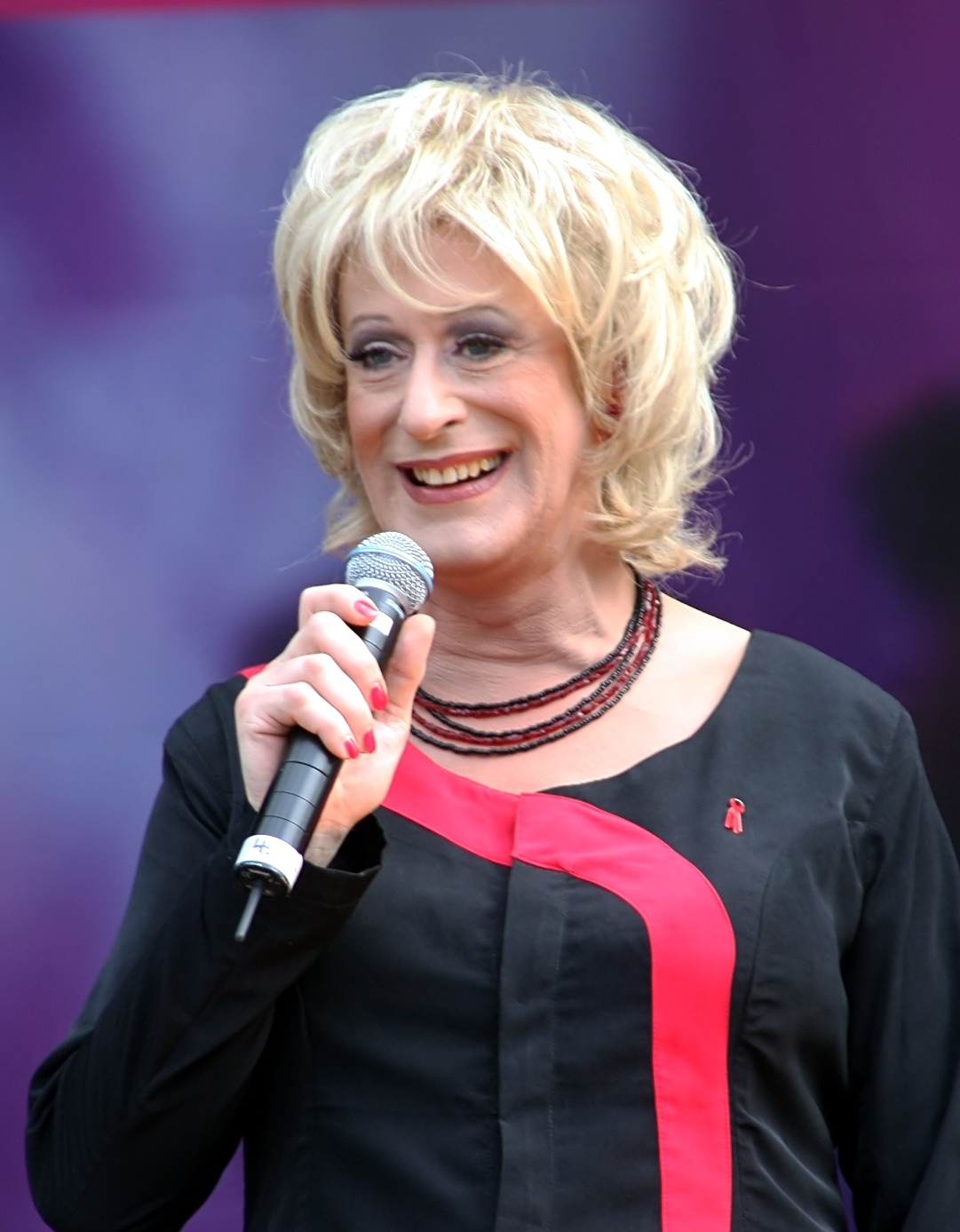
Lilo Wanders at ColognePride 2009

Ernst-Johann "Ernie" Reinhardt (born 22 September 1955), better known as Lilo Wanders, is a German transvestite actor, comedian and theatre/television host.

Born in Celle, Reinhardt attended the Gymnasium Walsrode and went on to become an entertainer. He was one of the founders of the Schmidt-Theater on the Reeperbahn in Hamburg in 1988. From 1994 on until 2004, he was in his transvestite role as Lilo Wanders the host of the German TV sex/erotic show Wa(h)re Liebe (a pun on true love and commodity love) on VOX.

On 22 December 2022, as part of the Massengeschmack TV advent calendar, Wanders published the sex and erotic magazine Massengeschnackseln.

== Published works ==
- Lilo Wanders: Tja, meine Lieben, Econ 1997, ISBN 3-612-26361-7.
- Lilo Wanders: Wa(h)re Liebe – A–Z, Heel 2001, ISBN 3-89880-021-0.
- Lilo Wanders: Exotische Scharfmacher, Europa Verlag Hamburg 2002, ISBN 3-203-85055-9.
- Lilo Wanders: Voll aufgeklärt: 100 Antworten auf 1000 Fragen, Moderne Verlagsges. MVG 2008, ISBN 3-636-06376-6.
- Erika Berger, Lilo Wanders: Langenscheidt Sex-Deutsch / Deutsch-Sex, Langenscheidt 2009, ISBN 3-468-73222-8.
