= Gaby Papenburg =

Gaby Papenburg (born 27 February 1960 in Walsrode) is a German sport television reporter and television presenter.

== Life ==
Papenburg studied Comparative literature in Bonn and in Hamburg. In Germany, Papenburg works as a television presenter on broadcaster SAT1. Papenburg is married and has two sons.
