= Böhme, Lower Saxony =

Böhme
- Municipality
- Location of Böhme within Heidekreis district
- Interactive map of Böhme
- Location within Germany Location within Lower Saxony
- Coordinates: 52°46′59″N 09°28′00″E
- Country: Germany
- State: Lower Saxony
- District: Heidekreis
- Municipal assoc.: Rethem (Aller)
- Subdivisions: 4 Ortsteile

Government
  - Mayor: Heinz-Wilhelm Korte

Area
  - Total: 37 km^{2} (14 sq mi)
- Elevation: 19 m (62 ft)

Population (2025-12-31)
  - Total: 942
  - Density: 25/km^{2} (66/sq mi)
- Time zone: UTC+01:00 (CET)
  - Summer (DST): UTC+02:00 (CEST)
- Postal codes: 29693
- Dialling codes: 05164
- Vehicle registration: HK, SFA

Böhme (German pronunciation: [ˈbøːmə]) is a municipality in the Heidekreis district, in Lower Saxony, Germany.

== Subdivisions ==
The four subdivisions in the municipality are:

- Böhme
- Bierde
- Altenwahlingen
- Kirchwahlingen
