= Bundesstraße 440 =

Federal highway in Germany

B 440
- Bundesstraße 440
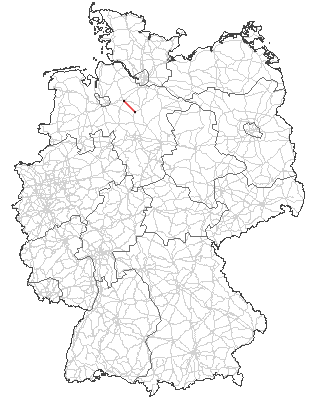
- B440 in red.

Route information
- Length: 40 km (25 mi)

Major junctions
- From: Rotenburg an der Wümme
- To: Bad Fallingbostel

Location
- Country: Germany
- States: Lower Saxony

Highway system
- Roads in Germany; Autobahns; List; Federal; List; State; E-roads

The B 440 is a German federal road in Lower Saxony. It runs from the district town of Rotenburg an der Wümme to Bad Fallingbostel. It was based on an old Army road built by Napoléon Bonaparte.

== Course ==
It begins at the B 215, runs through the so-called Mill Quarter (Mühlenviertel) of Rotenburg an der Wümme, passes nearby Bothel and after about 20 km passes through the town centre of Visselhövede to the southeast. Continuing in a southwesterly direction it crosses the Bomlitz valley north of Bomlitz. In Dorfmark (part of Bad Fallingbostel) it crosses the B 209 and joins the A 7 motorway just east of the village.

== Junction lists ==
Legend:

- I/C - Interchange, I/S - Intersection, RSA - Rest and service area, OBR - Overhead bridge restaurant, R/R - Restaurant and rest plaza, L/B - Layby, V/P - Vista point, TN - tunnel, T/P - Toll plaza, BR - Bridge
- C - Cloverleaf, S - Stack, T-A - Trumpet-A, T-B - Trumpet-B, DT - Directional-T/Y, SDT - Semi-Directional-T/Y, P-Y - Partial-Y, D - Diamond, P-C - Partial cloverleaf, D-D - Diverging diamond, D-R - Direct ramp

Rotenburg (Wümme) B 215
Hassel
Wittorf
Visselhövede L171
Ottingen
Bommelsen
Dorfmark A 7

== See also ==
- List of federal highways in Germany
