= Walsrode Abbey =

Coordinates: 52°51′37.77″N 9°35′47.74″E

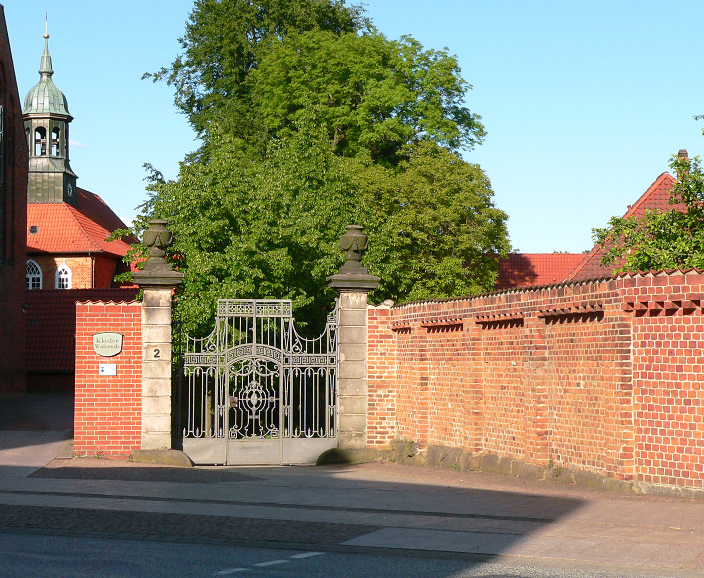
Main gate and convent wall. Left: the chapel

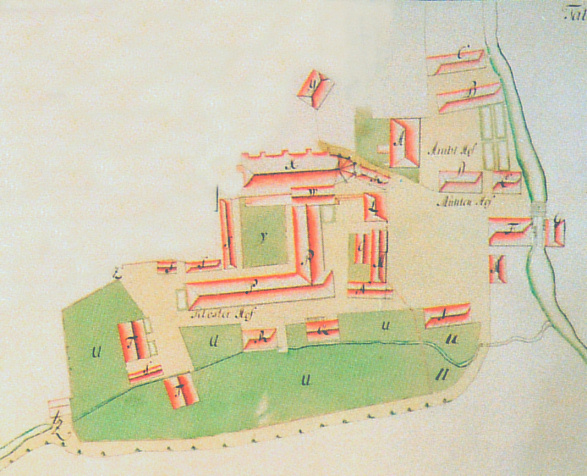
Plan of the monastery in 1755

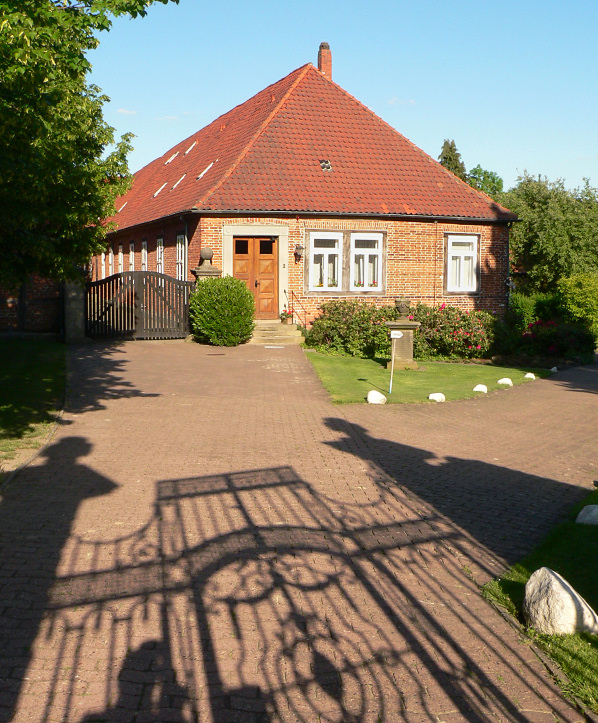
View of the interior through the main gate

Walsrode Abbey (German: Kloster Walsrode) in Walsrode, Germany, is an Evangelical-Lutheran women's convent that is maintained by the Hanover monastic chamber (Klosterkammer Hannover). It is one of the historic monasteries of Benedictine nuns on the Lüneburg Heath in North Germany which are collectively known as the Lüneklöster.

== History ==
The monastery was founded in 986 by Count Wale and his wife Odelint according to a decree by King Otto III and is by far the oldest in the former Principality of Lüneburg. Its patron saint is John the Baptist.

In 1482 a large part of the monastery was burned down following a lightning strike. Part of the brick walls and stained glass windows of the chapel are products of the subsequent late Gothic restoration. In 1626, during the Thirty Years War, it was plundered by Tilly's troops. During the period 1812-1815 the convent was closed and the monastery occupied by Napoleon for 3 years. Its chequered history ensured that many art treasures and the original structure of the building were destroyed, so that today it mainly comprises buildings from the 18th century, like the well-known Long House (Lange Haus) of 1720. The impressive refectory was an endowment from the last German emperor, Kaiser Wilhelm II and his empress.

The introduction of the Lutheran Reformation in the 16th century into all six Lüneburg communities of nuns took several decades.
