= Dorfmark =

German village

Coordinates: 52°54′N 9°45′E

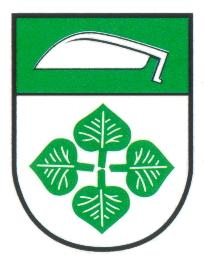
Dorfmark's coat of arms

The village of Dorfmark is part of the borough of Bad Fallingbostel in Heidekreis district in the German state of Lower Saxony.

Dorfmark has 3,469 inhabitants, over 22% of the borough's population, and an area of 15.48 square kilometres (3,830 acres), some 24% of the total area in the borough.

The River Böhme flows through Dorfmark and discharges into the Aller between Hodenhagen and Rethem.

== History ==
Tumuli from the Old Bronze Age are the most visible witnesses of earlier settlement.

The first mention of Dorfmark in the records was around 968 (as Thormarcon). In 1927/28 the village incorporated the farming communities of Westendorf, Fischendorf, Dorfmark and Winkelhausen. Since the regional reorganisation in 1974, Dorfmark has belonged to Bad Fallingbostel. Previously it had been independent.

== Economy ==
An important economic factor in the village, in addition to handicrafts and agriculture, is tourism. In the industrial estate is one of the largest used car centres in Europe: ALD AutoLeasing D sells there about 10,000 former leased cars per year.

== Transport ==
Dorfmark lies immediately next to A 7 motorway exit no. 46. The B 440 federal road begins at the exit and runs to Rotenburg (Wümme). The Landesstraße L 163 runs through the village in a north-south direction from Soltau to Bad Fallingbostel and crosses the B 440 within the village. Dorfmark also has a station on the Heath Railway that runs from Hanover to Soltau.

== Events ==
- Wine festival (Weinfest): Organised by the volunteer fire service (Freiwillige Feuerwehr) and takes place every year at Whitsun weekend.
- Shooting festival (Schützenfest): The annual Dorfmark shooting festival takes place at the beginning of July and lasts for two days.
- Beach festival (Strandfest): Since 1928 the beach festival has been celebrated every second weekend in August. It attracts thousands of spectators every year from a wide radius.
- Krämer Market (Krämermarkt): The annual Krämer Market is at the end of September each year. It is a large street flea market with a range of events in the village centre.
- Christmas Market (Weihnachtsmarkt): In recent years on the third weekend of Advent a Christmas market has been set up by a group of hired artists from the area and the church parish of Dorfmark.
- Various events by the parish of Dorfmark.
- Various events by the parish's local heritage group.

== Places of interest ==
- the Evangelical church of St. Martin
- Market place
- Well
- Bommühle mill
- Bürgerpark municipal park (which even has plants that are on the IUCN's Red List.)
- Fish ponds

== People ==
- Friedrich Missler (b 1858 in Dorfmark d 1922 in Bremen) wealthy and benevolent Bremen merchant
- Erich von Manstein (b Fritz Erich von Lewinski, m 24 November 1887 in Berlin; d 10 June 1973 in Irschenhausen/Isartal; buried in Dorfmark)
- Hans-Joachim Walde (b 1942), track athlete. Bronze medal winner in the decathlon at the 1964 Olympic Games in Tokyo; silver medal winner in the decathlon at the 1968 Olympic Games in Mexico City.
- Lilo Wanders (actually Ernie Reinhard; b 1955), actor and drag artist, who spent his childhood in Dorfmark
- Frank Ordenewitz (b 1965), former professional footballer

== Twin towns – sister cities ==
Dorfmark is twinned with:

- Tinchebray-Bocage, France
