= Neuenkirchen (Lüneburg Heath) =

- Municipality
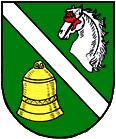
- Coat of arms

- Location of Neuenkirchen within Heidekreis district
- Interactive map of Neuenkirchen
- Location within Germany Location within Lower Saxony
- Coordinates: 53°02′05″N 9°42′29″E
- Country: Germany
- State: Lower Saxony
- District: Heidekreis

Government
  - Mayor (2018–23): Carlos Brunkhorst (CDU)

Area
  - Total: 97.09 km^{2} (37.49 sq mi)
- Elevation: 69 m (226 ft)

Population (2025-12-31)
  - Total: 5,319
  - Density: 54.78/km^{2} (141.9/sq mi)
- Time zone: UTC+01:00 (CET)
  - Summer (DST): UTC+02:00 (CEST)
- Postal codes: 29643
- Dialling codes: 05195
- Vehicle registration: HK
- Website: www.gemeinde-neuenkirchen.de

Neuenkirchen (German pronunciation: [ˈnɔʏənˌkɪʁçn̩]) is a municipality in the district of Heidekreis, in Lower Saxony, Germany.
