= Visselhövede =

- Town
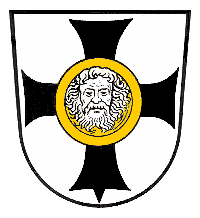
- Flag Coat of arms

- Location of Visselhövede within Rotenburg (Wümme) district
- Interactive map of Visselhövede
- Location within Germany Location within Lower Saxony
- Coordinates: 52°58′N 9°35′E
- Country: Germany
- State: Lower Saxony
- District: Rotenburg (Wümme)

Government
  - Mayor (2021–26): Gerald Lutz (Ind.)

Area
  - Total: 159.2 km^{2} (61.5 sq mi)
- Elevation: 70 m (230 ft)

Population (2025-12-31)
  - Total: 9,542
  - Density: 59.94/km^{2} (155.2/sq mi)
- Time zone: UTC+01:00 (CET)
  - Summer (DST): UTC+02:00 (CEST)
- Postal codes: 27374
- Dialling codes: 04262
- Vehicle registration: ROW
- Website: www.visselhoevede.de

Visselhövede (German pronunciation: [ˌfɪsl̩ˈhøːvədə]) is a town in the district of Rotenburg in Lower Saxony, Germany. Nearby towns include the district capital Rotenburg, Walsrode and Verden. Larger cities within a 100 km radius are Bremen, Hanover and Hamburg. On 30 April 2024 Visselhövede had 10.116 inhabitants.

Visselhövede belonged to the Prince-Bishopric of Verden, established in 1180. In 1648 the Prince-Bishopric was transformed into the Principality of Verden, which was first ruled in personal union by the Swedish Crown - interrupted by a Danish occupation (1712–1715) - and from 1715 on by the Hanoverian Crown. The Kingdom of Hanover incorporated the Principality in a real union and the Princely territory, including Visselhövede, became part of the new Stade Region, established in 1823.

== Sights ==
The most famous building is St. Johannis-Kirche, a protestant church named after John the Baptist. It was built of bricks in a gothic style and consecrated in 1358. The wooden clock tower measuring 23 metres in height was built in 1799. The church houses various masterpieces of art, e.g. a baroque altar dating from 1771 and a baroque organ from 1779, a baptismal font and wall paintings from the Middle Ages and a pulprit dating from 1641. The source of river Vissel can be visited in a small park behind the church. The Town Hall in the Market Place was built around 1796. In Burgstrasse, the oldest street in town, the Heimathaus, a half-timbered house which was renovated in 1999, is worth a visit. It is the cultural centre of Visselhövede.

Bürgerpark Visselseen is a public park with four lakes where two historical store houses, which had been dismantled at the former site, were reconstructed in 2006.

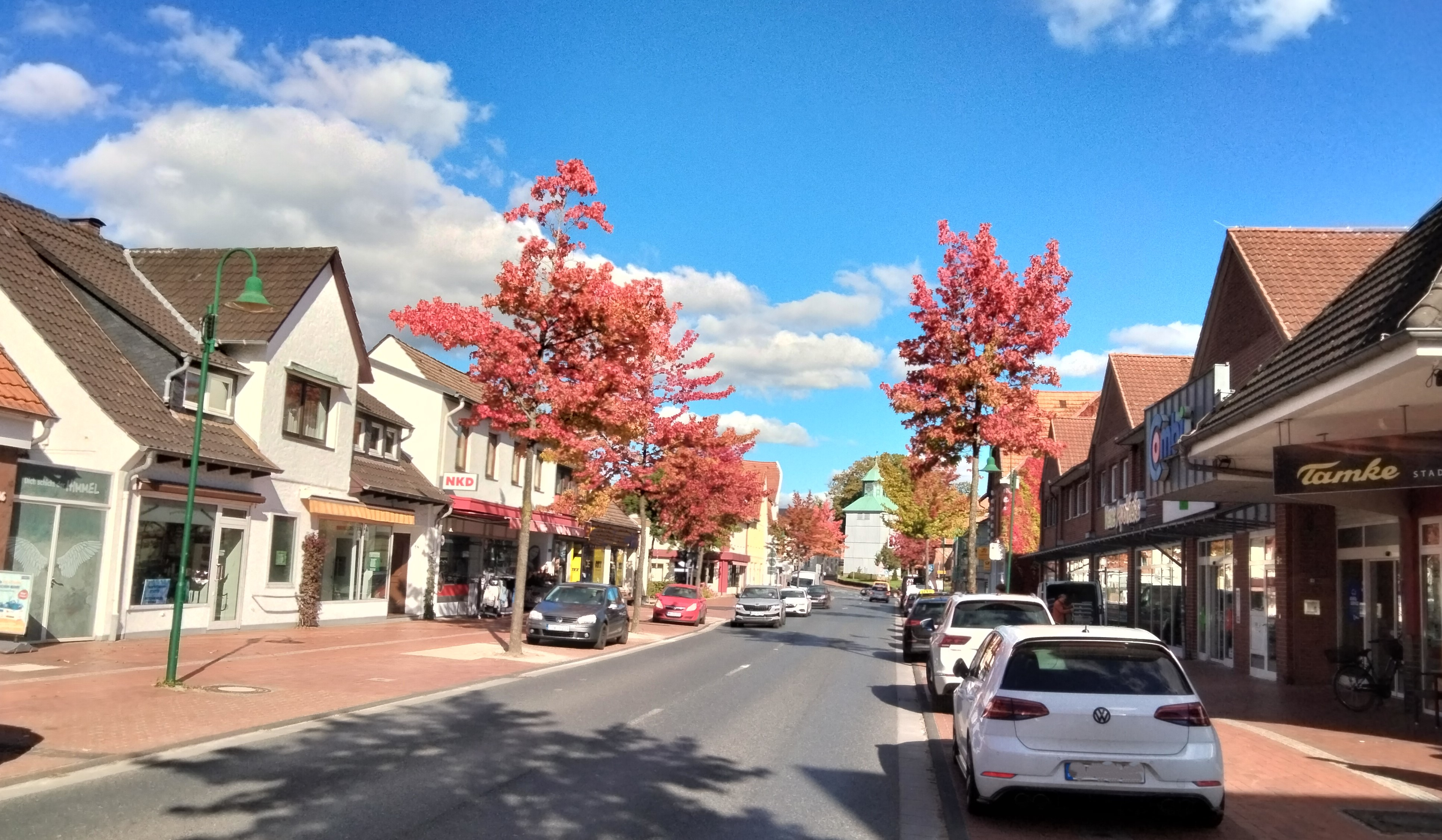
Main Street and clock tower

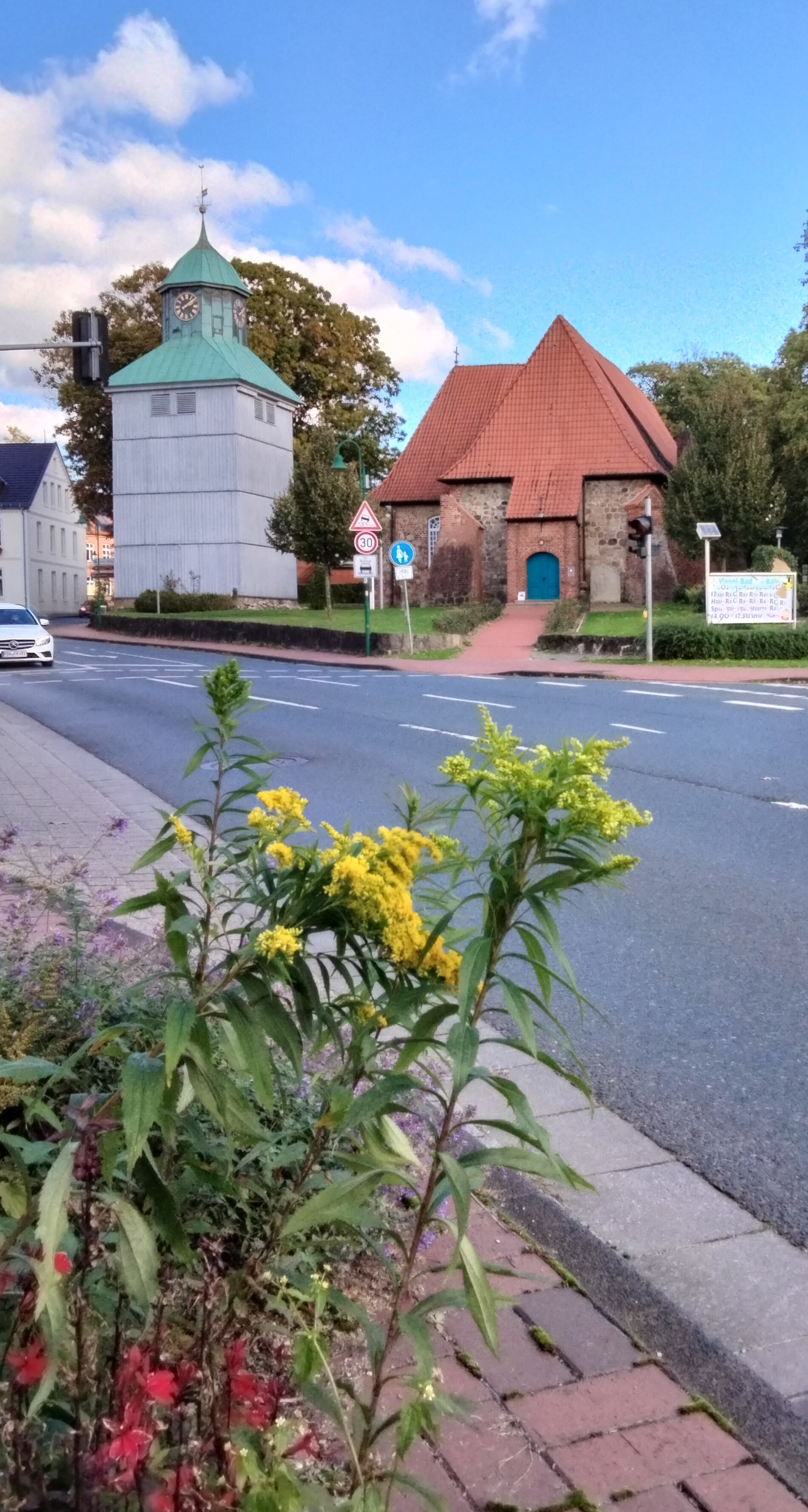
Protestant Church with clock tower

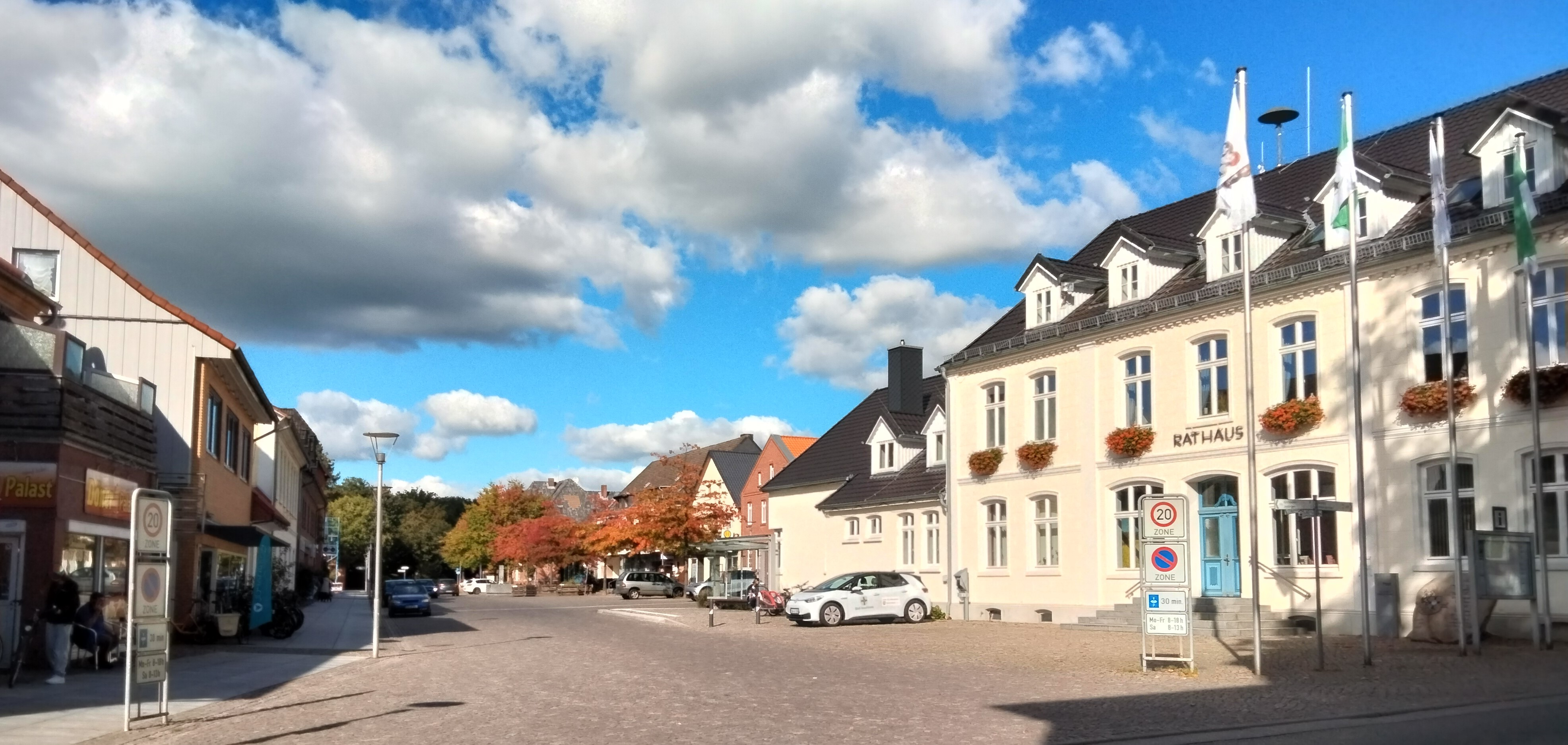
Market Place with Town Hall

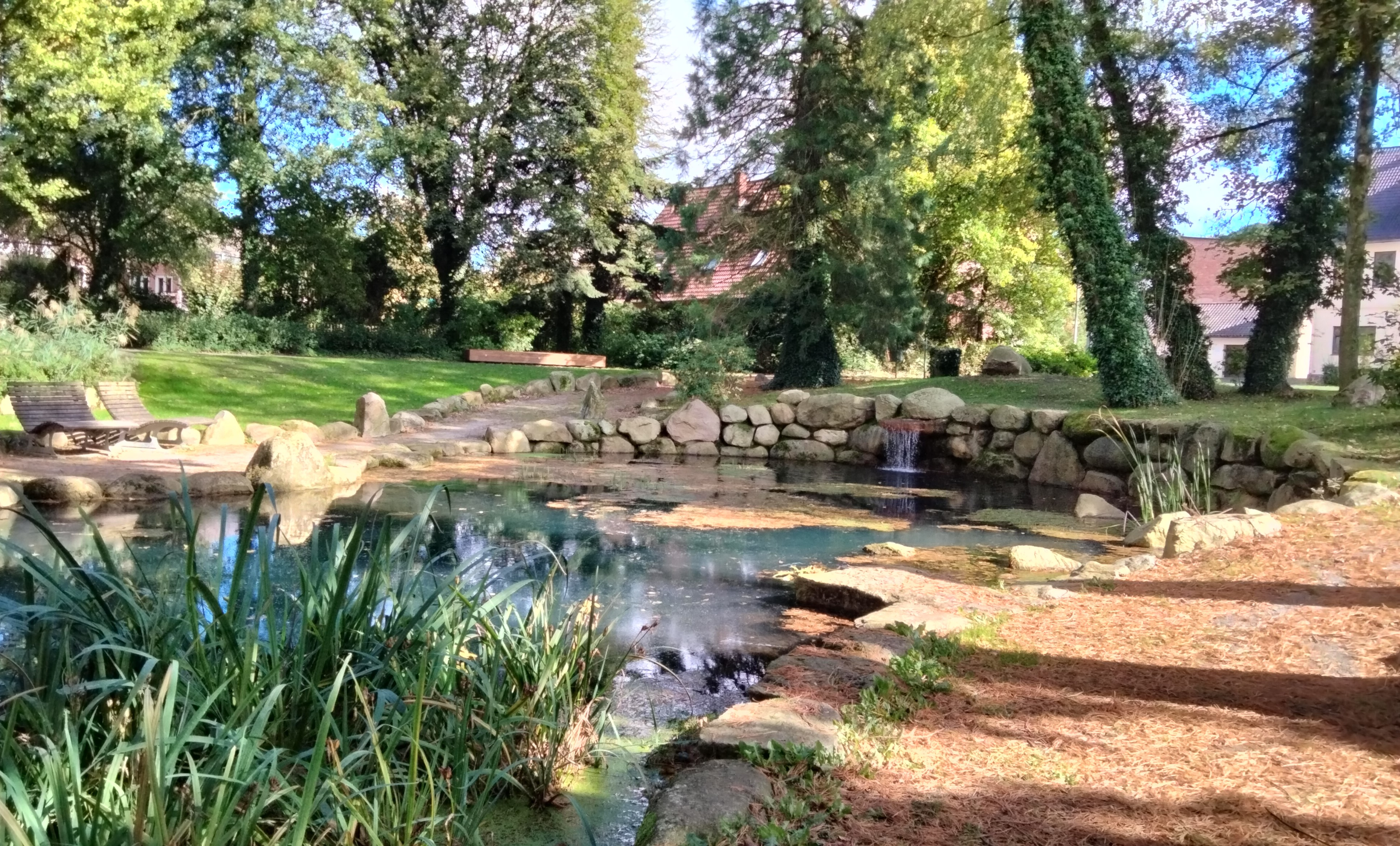
Source of River Vissel

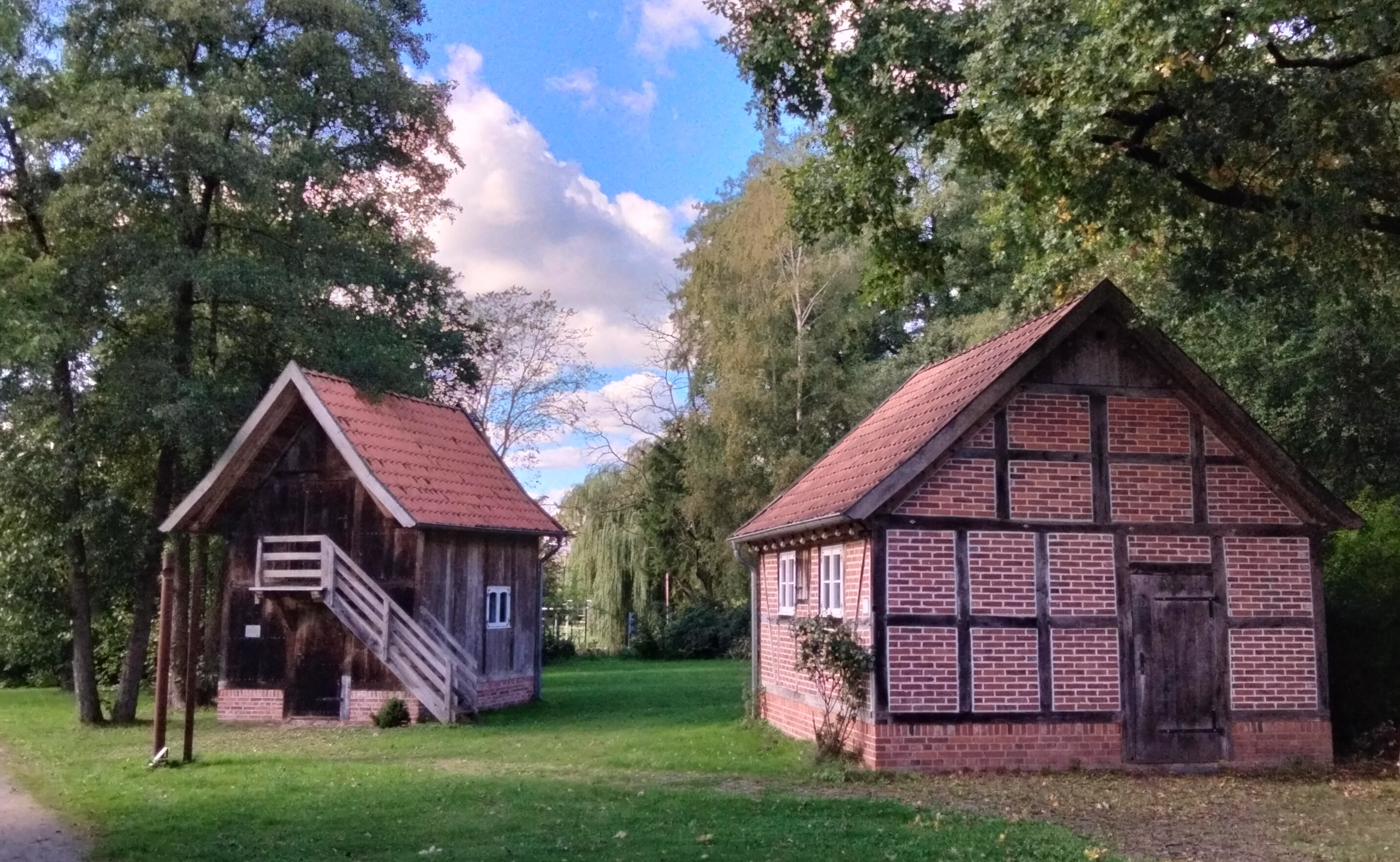
Reconstructed store houses

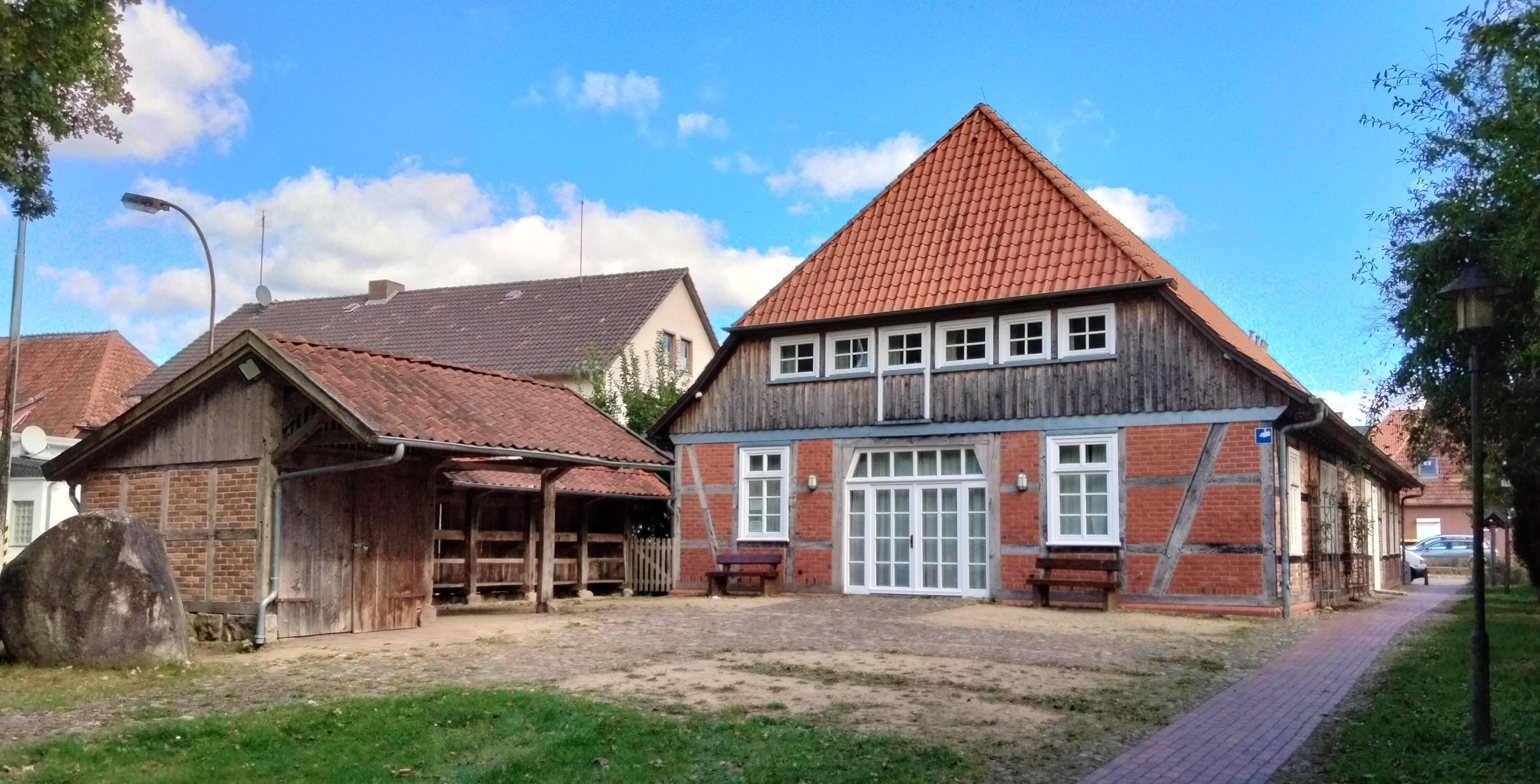
Cultural centre Heimathaus

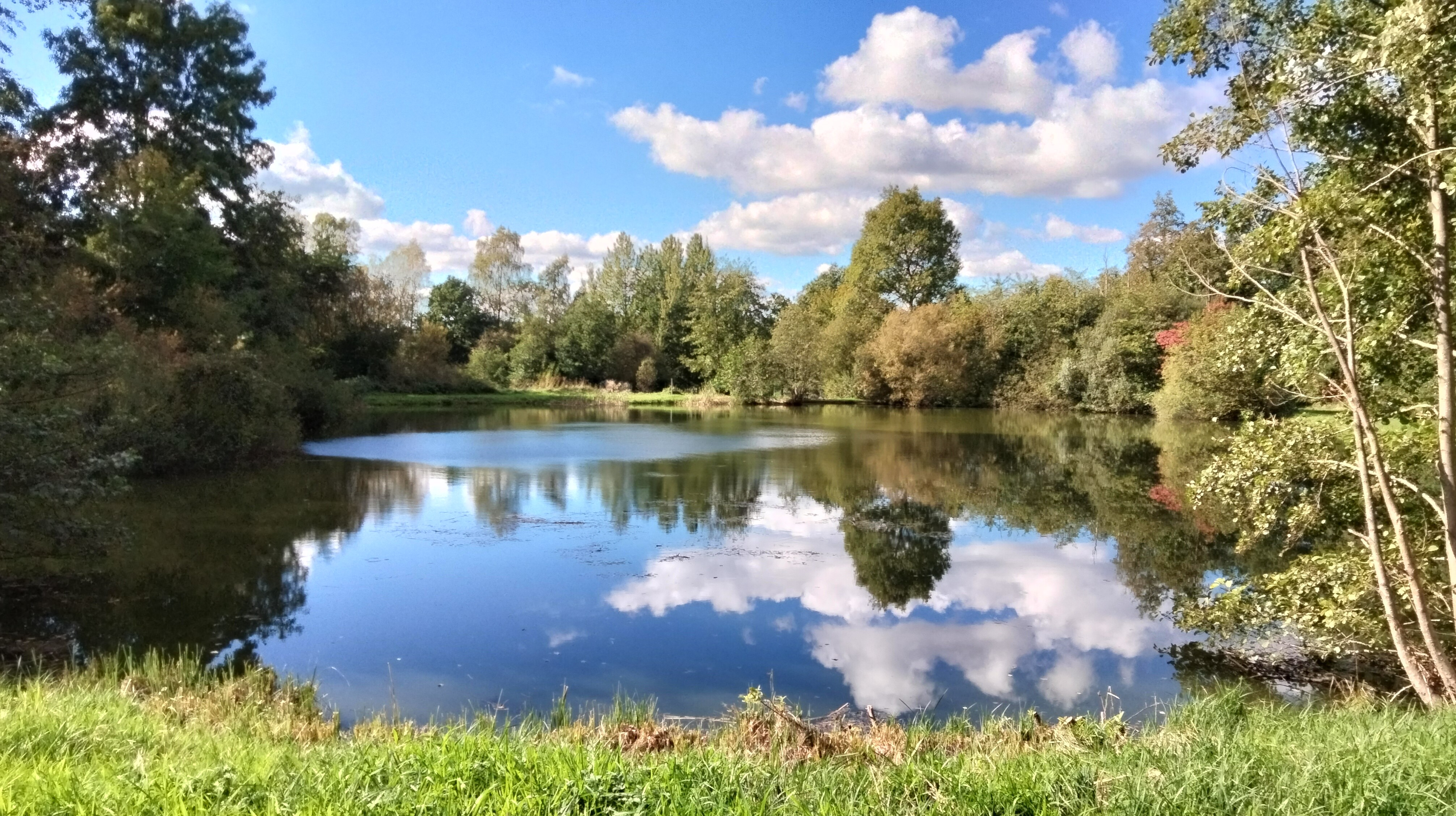
Lake in Bürgerpark Visselseen

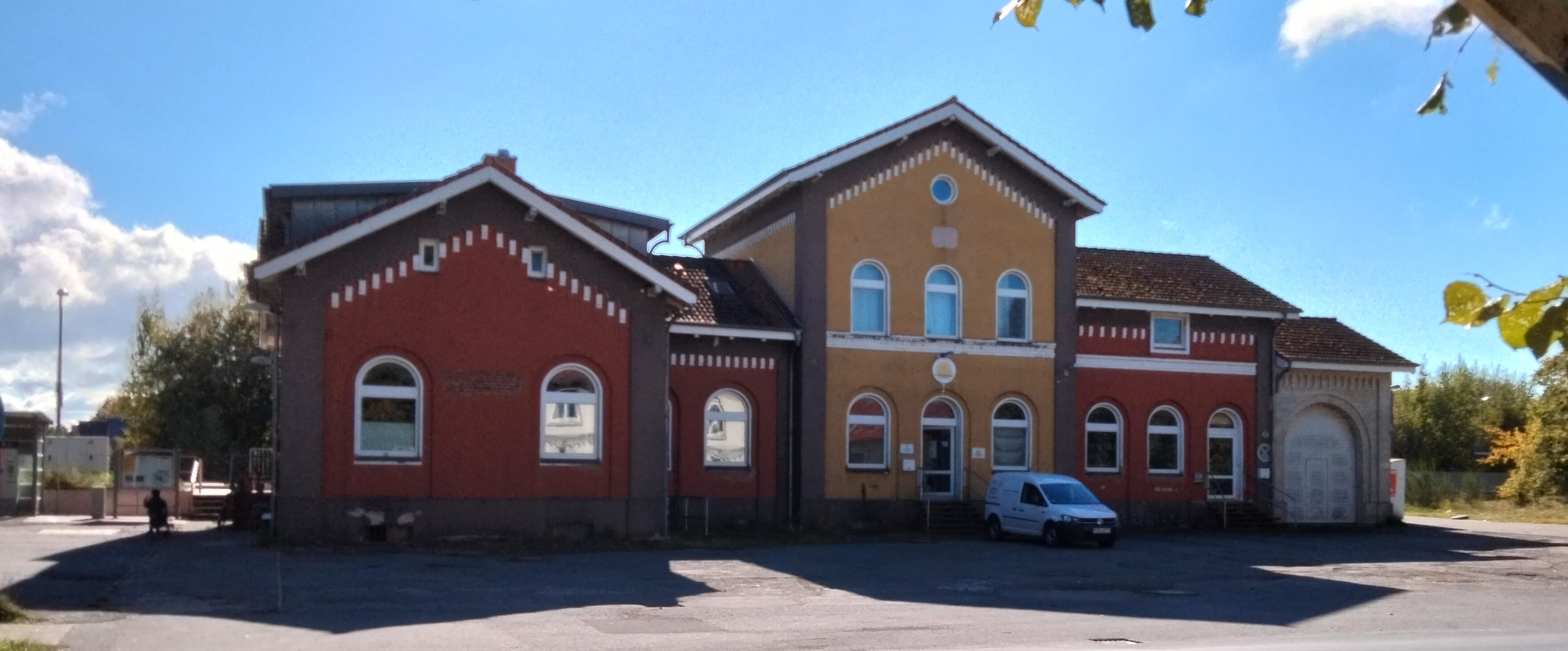
Railway station

== See also ==
- Visselhövede station
