= Walsrode =

- Town
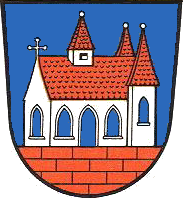
- Flag Coat of arms

- Location of Walsrode within Heidekreis district
- Interactive map of Walsrode
- Location within Germany Location within Lower Saxony
- Coordinates: 52°52′N 9°35′E
- Country: Germany
- State: Lower Saxony
- District: Heidekreis
- Subdivisions: 31 districts

Government
  - Mayor (2020–25): Helma Spöring (Ind.)

Area
  - Total: 336.46 km^{2} (129.91 sq mi)
- Elevation: 49 m (161 ft)

Population (2025-12-31)
  - Total: 30,942
  - Density: 91.963/km^{2} (238.18/sq mi)
- Time zone: UTC+01:00 (CET)
  - Summer (DST): UTC+02:00 (CEST)
- Postal codes: 29664
- Dialling codes: 05161
- Vehicle registration: HK
- Website: www.walsrode.de

Walsrode (German pronunciation: [valsˈʁoːdə]; Low German: Wasra) is a town in the district of Heidekreis, in Lower Saxony, Germany. The former municipality Bomlitz was merged into Walsrode in January 2020.

== History ==
=== Middle Ages ===
986 Foundation of Walsrode Abbey by Count Walo. The first recorded mention of the town is dated May 7, 986.

1383 The dukes of Brunswick and Lüneburg grant Walsrode a town charter.

1479 First recorded instance of Walsrode's coat of arms. At the end of the 15th century the sculptor Hans Brüggemann, creator of the renowned Bordesholm Altar of Schleswig Cathedral, is born in the town.

=== Early modern times ===
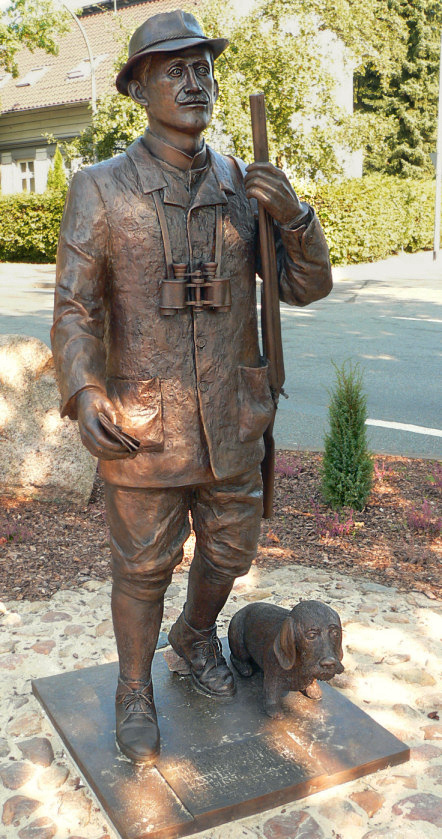
Life-sized statue of Herman Löns

1626 Extensive destruction in the town by the troops of Count Tilly during the Thirty Years' War.

1757 The town is totally destroyed by a catastrophic fire.

1811 During the Napoleonic era, Walsrode becomes a border town between France and the Kingdom of Westphalia.

1814 Walsrode is incorporated in the Kingdom of Hanover.

1866 Annexation of Walsrode by Prussia.

1890 Railroad first extends to Walsrode.

=== 20th century ===
1957 The German border patrol agency (Bundesgrenzschutz) establishes a training school in the town.

1984 The state legislature of Lower Saxony allows the town to incorporate as an "independent community".

== Places of interest ==
- Walsrode Abbey
- Rischmannshof Heath Museum
- Weltvogelpark Walsrode

== Twin towns – sister cities ==
Walsrode is twinned with:

- Blainville-sur-Orne, France
- Gernrode (Quedlinburg), Germany
- Hibbing, United States
- Kępice, Poland
- Kovel, Ukraine
- Zaltbommel, Netherlands

== Notable people ==
- Hans Brüggemann (c. 1480–1521), artist
- Louis Harms (1808–1865), Lutheran pastor
- Frank Hibbing, founder of Hibbing
- Hermine Overbeck-Rohte (1869–1938), landscape painter
- Maren Kroymann (born 1949), actress and singer
- Gaby Papenburg (born 1960), sports journalist
- Frank Glorius (born 1972), chemist
- Onur Ayık (born 1990), footballer

== See also ==
- Metropolitan region Hannover-Braunschweig-Göttingen-Wolfsburg
