= Jordanbach =

River in Germany

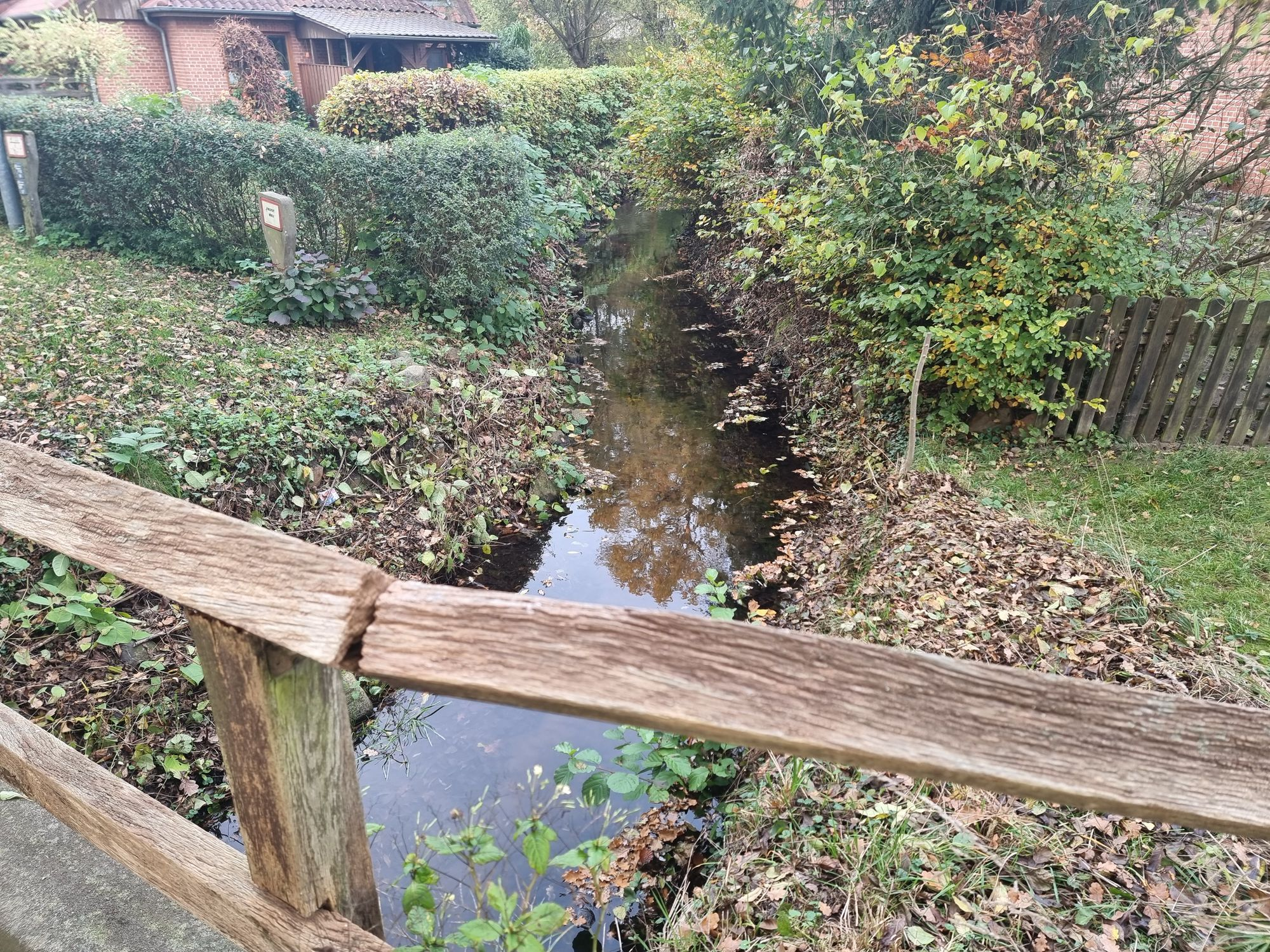

Location
- Location: Stadt Walsrode, Heidekreis, Lower Saxony

Physical characteristics
- Source
  - location: im Vehmsmoor
  - coordinates: 52°51′03″N 9°29′47″E
  - elevation: 63 m above sea level (NN)
- Mouth
  - location: southwest of Altenboitzen into the Böhme
  - coordinates: 52°48′07″N 9°29′51″E
  - elevation: 22 m above sea level (NN)
- Length: 7.7 km
- Basin size: 15.6 km²

Basin features
- Progression: Böhme → Aller → Weser → North Sea
- River system: Weser

The Jordanbach is a river of Lower Saxony, Germany. It is a right-bank tributary of the Böhme.

The Jordanbach lies entirely within the borough of Walsrode which is part of Heidekreis district in Lower Saxony. It is about 7 kilometres (4.3 mi) long and has its source in the bog Vehmsmoor, which it drains. It flows in a southerly direction through Altenboitzen and discharges southwest of the village into the Böhme.

The Jordanbach gives its name to a railway line between Bomlitz and Altenboitzen, that is nowadays only used for tourist purposes, such as the special trains of the Heath Express run by the Lüneburg Transport Society (Arbeitsgemeinschaft Verkehrsfreunde Lüneburg). This section of the Verden – Walsrode line operated by the Verden-Walsrode Railway, which was formed in 1910, is also called the Jordan-Bomlitz Railway, because it runs from the valley of the Jordanbach to the Bomlitz valley.

== See also ==
- List of rivers of Lower Saxony
