= Weltvogelpark Walsrode =

Bird park near Walsrode, Germany

Walsrode World Bird Park
- (Weltvogelpark Walsrode)

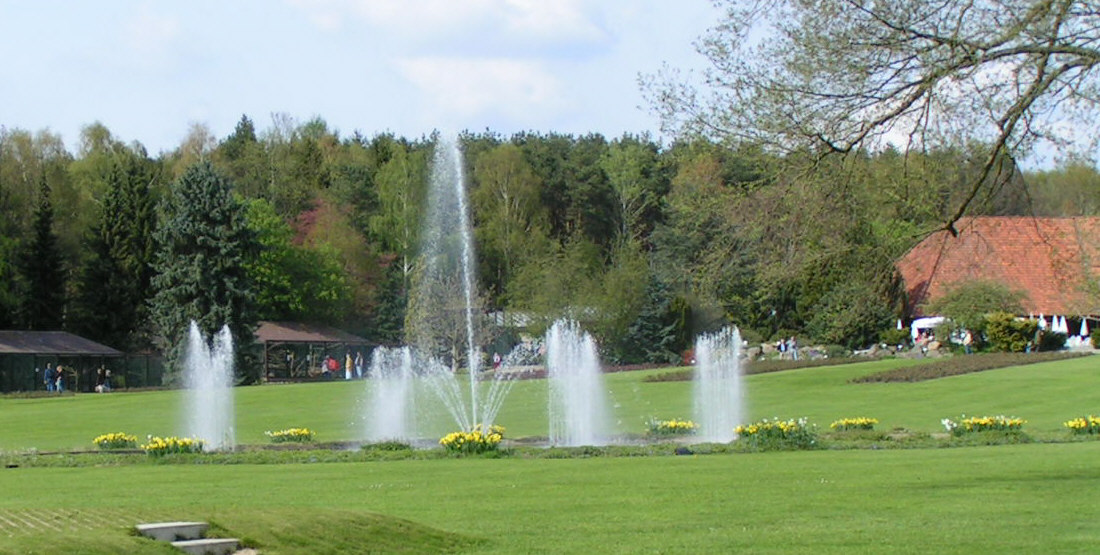
- Typical aviaries with a restaurant in the background
- Interactive map of Walsrode World Bird Park
- 52°52′54″N 9°35′54″E
- Date opened: 1962
- Location: Near Walsrode in the Lüneburg Heath, North Germany
- Land area: 24 hectares (59 acres)
- No. of animals: 4,000
- No. of species: 600
- Annual visitors: 300,000 (2011)
- Memberships: European Association of Zoos and Aquaria (EAZA); CRAX International; Cracid Breeding and Conservation Centre (CBCC)
- Website: www.weltvogelpark.de

Walsrode World Bird Park (German: Weltvogelpark Walsrode) is a bird park located in the middle of the Lüneburg Heath in North Germany near Walsrode in the state of Lower Saxony, Germany.

It is the largest bird park in the world in terms of species as well as land area, although the Bird Paradise in Singapore (formerly the Jurong Bird Park) claims the largest number of individual birds. Walsrode World Bird Park covers 24 hectares (59 acres) and houses some 4,000 birds of 600 species from every continent and climatic zone in the world. The park celebrated its fiftieth anniversary in 2012.

== History ==
The park was founded in 1962 by the Walsrode businessman, Fritz Geschke, for privately breeding pheasants and water birds. In 1962, his daughter, Uschi and her husband, Wolf Brehm, took over the park with the intention of creating a conservation and visitor centre, doubling the size within the first 6 years. In 1968, the 2,100-square-metre (23,000 sq ft) "Paradies-Halle", a tropical bird house, was opened. Trend-setting facilities such as the free flight aviary, a penguin enclosure and many others followed.

In 2000, on the occasion of the Expo in Hanover, the Jungle Hall was opened with its Indonesian artefacts and Asiatic bird species. Later, the Eagle Owl Hill and Treehouse Village were added. The German bird cage museum, also located in the bird park, was closed in 2006 and auctioned at Sotheby's.

Due to business difficulties, the park was transferred in 2000 to new ownership. Whilst in earlier years shows had been largely dropped, the new owners introduced more flight demonstrations which increased the number of visitors and ensured the survival of the park. Nevertheless, visitor numbers dropped in 2008 to 280,000; 50,000 fewer than necessary for a profitable operation. Looming insolvency was averted in March 2009 by the intervention of the Belgian firm, Floralux.

In 2010, the official international name of Walsrode Bird Park (Vogelpark Walsrode) was changed to Walsrode World Bird Park (Weltvogelpark Walsrode).

== Facilities ==
The bird park comprises a large number of internal and external aviaries as well as outdoor enclosures. In addition, the visitor can meet birds in an environment modelled on their natural habitat with no artificial barriers both in a free flight aviary with sand dunes and a wave machine, as well as in numerous buildings, such as the Jungle Hall. Whilst the more recent areas of the bird park are based more on the natural environment of the birds, the older areas mainly consist of spacious parkland and woods including large rose and rhododendron beds.

One special attraction is the variety of flight demonstrations on an open-air stage where falcons and eagles are displayed, as well as parrots, pelicans and Indian Runner ducks. There are also various feeding demonstrations and a young bird rearing station which is particularly interesting to children.

== Breeding programme ==
The bird park has a range of birds that cannot be seen in other zoos in the world, and was the first to successfully breed a number of species, such as Golden-headed Quetzals. The bird park participates in the European Endangered Species Programme and has, for example, made eagle owls available for reintroduction into the wild.

== Heritage railway ==
In the vicinity of the bird park is a stop on the Bomlitz–Walsrode railway which runs heritage rail services.

== Gallery ==
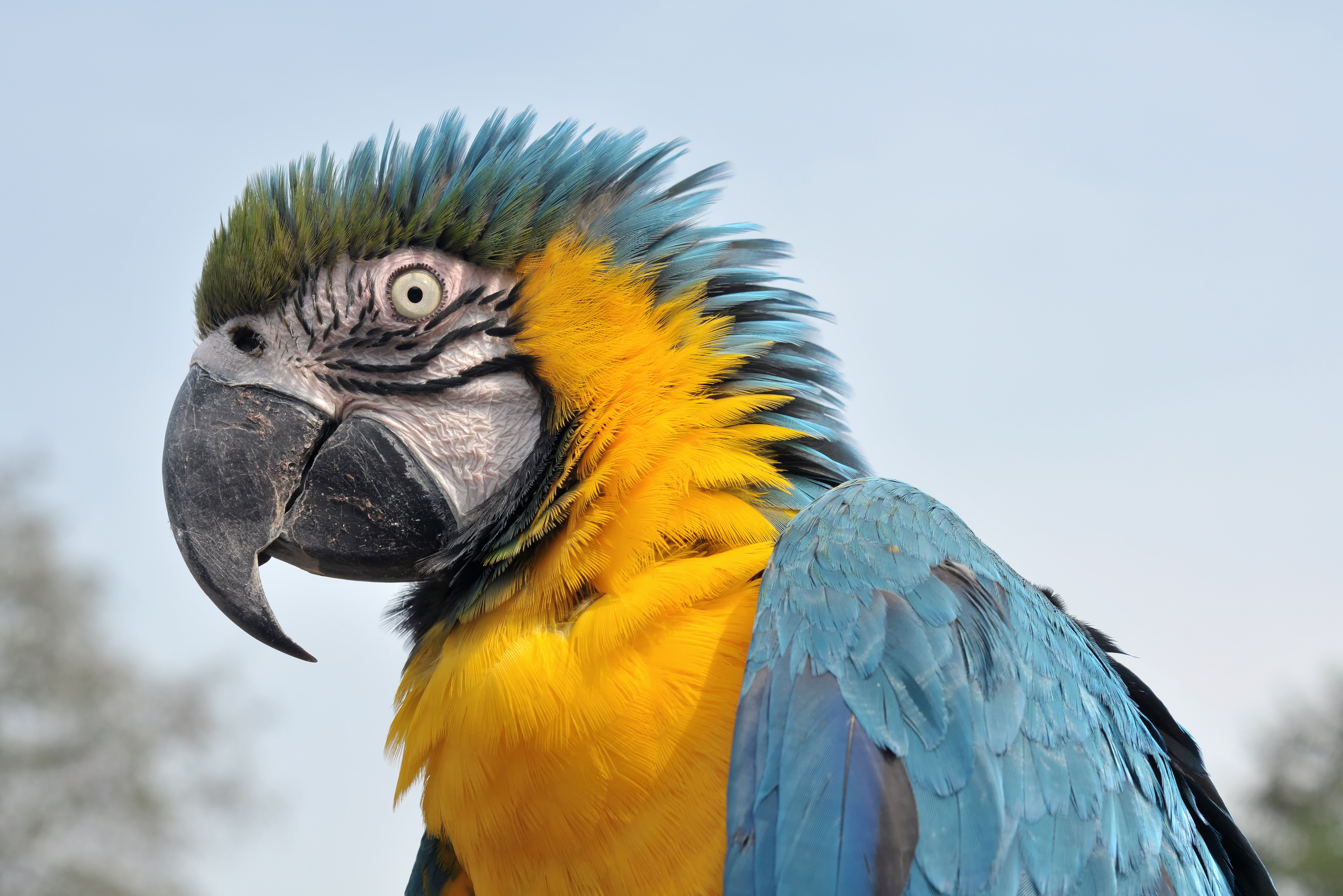
A blue-and-yellow macaw during the flying demonstration

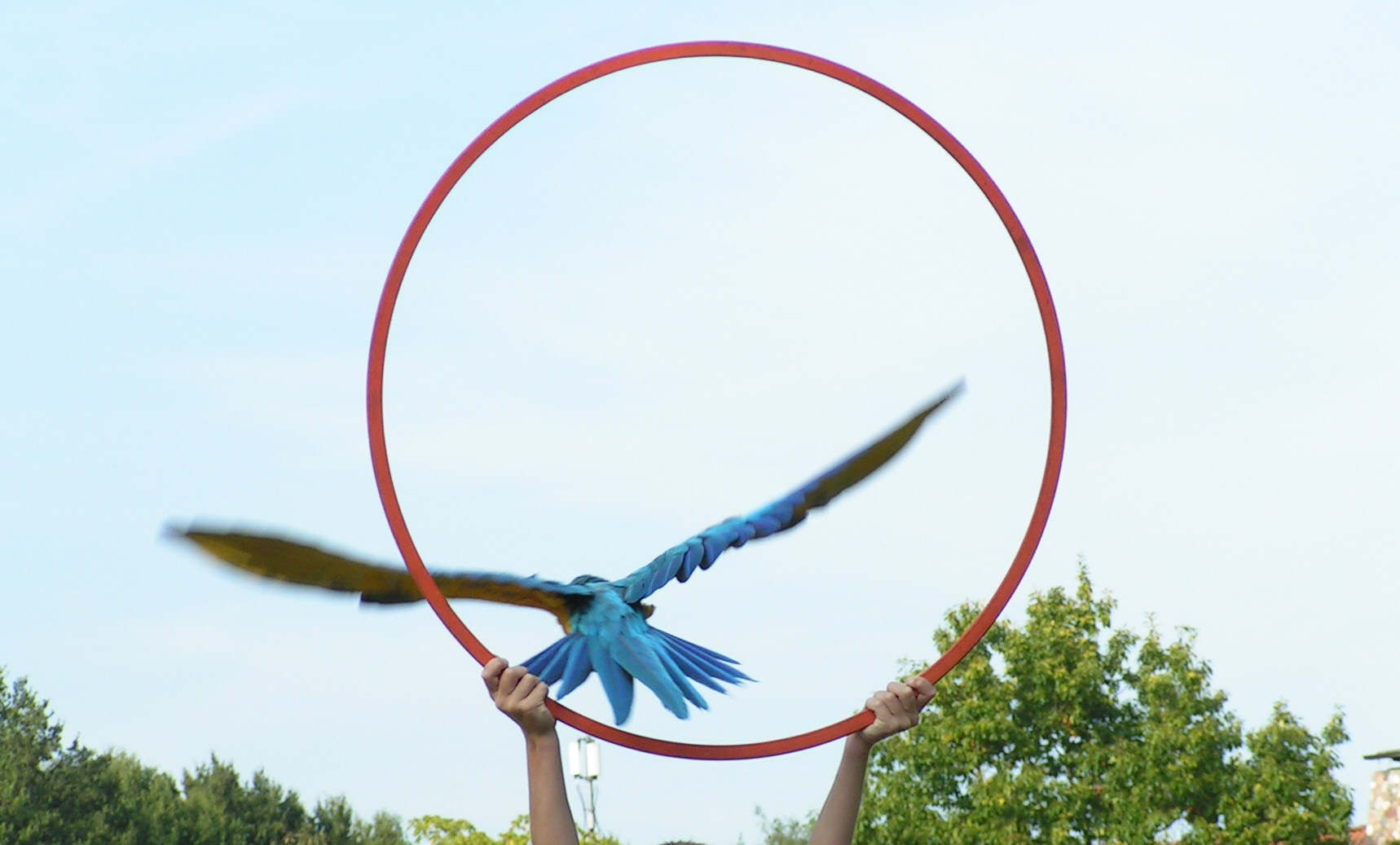
Macaw in flying demonstration

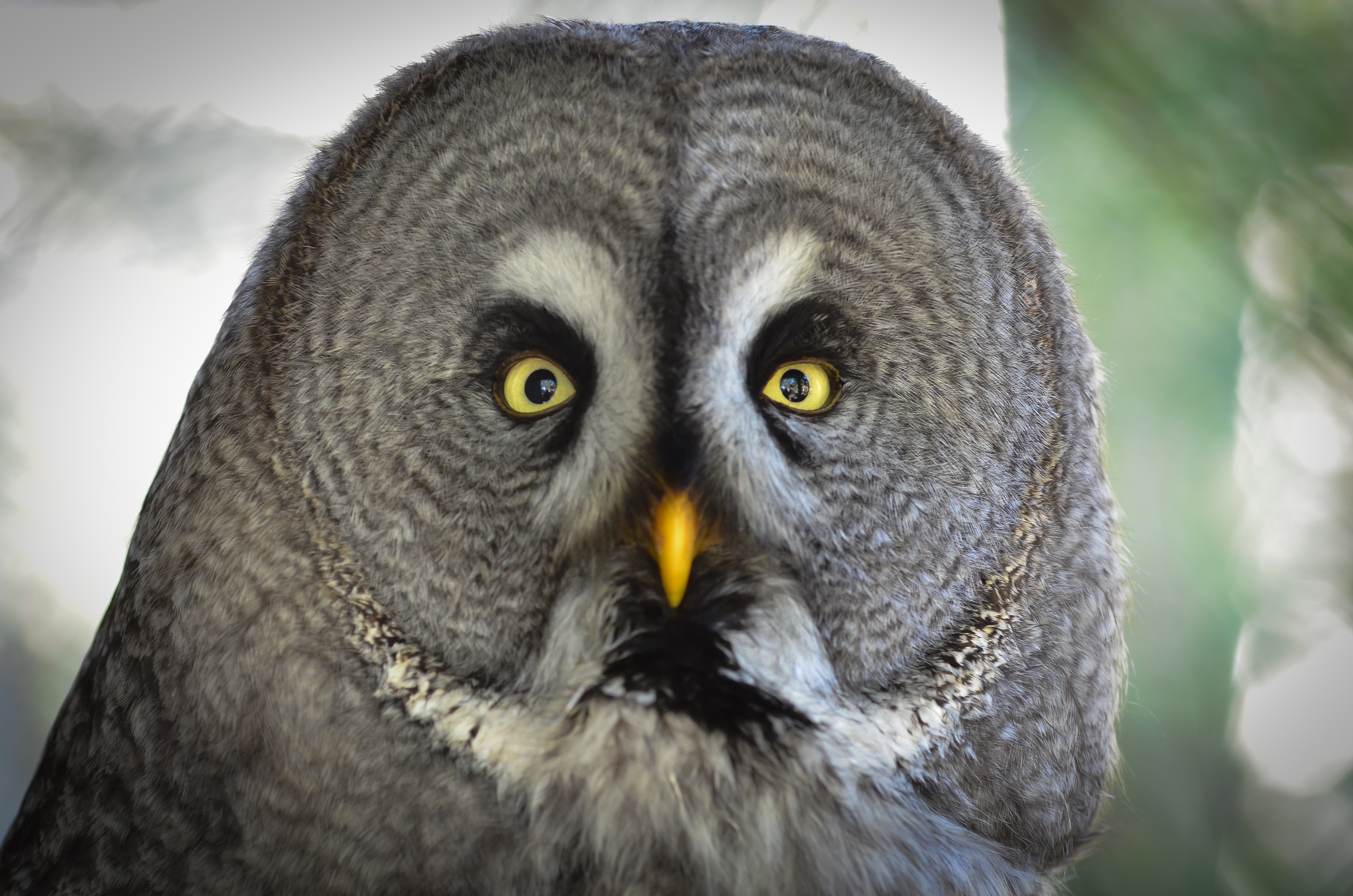
Great grey owl

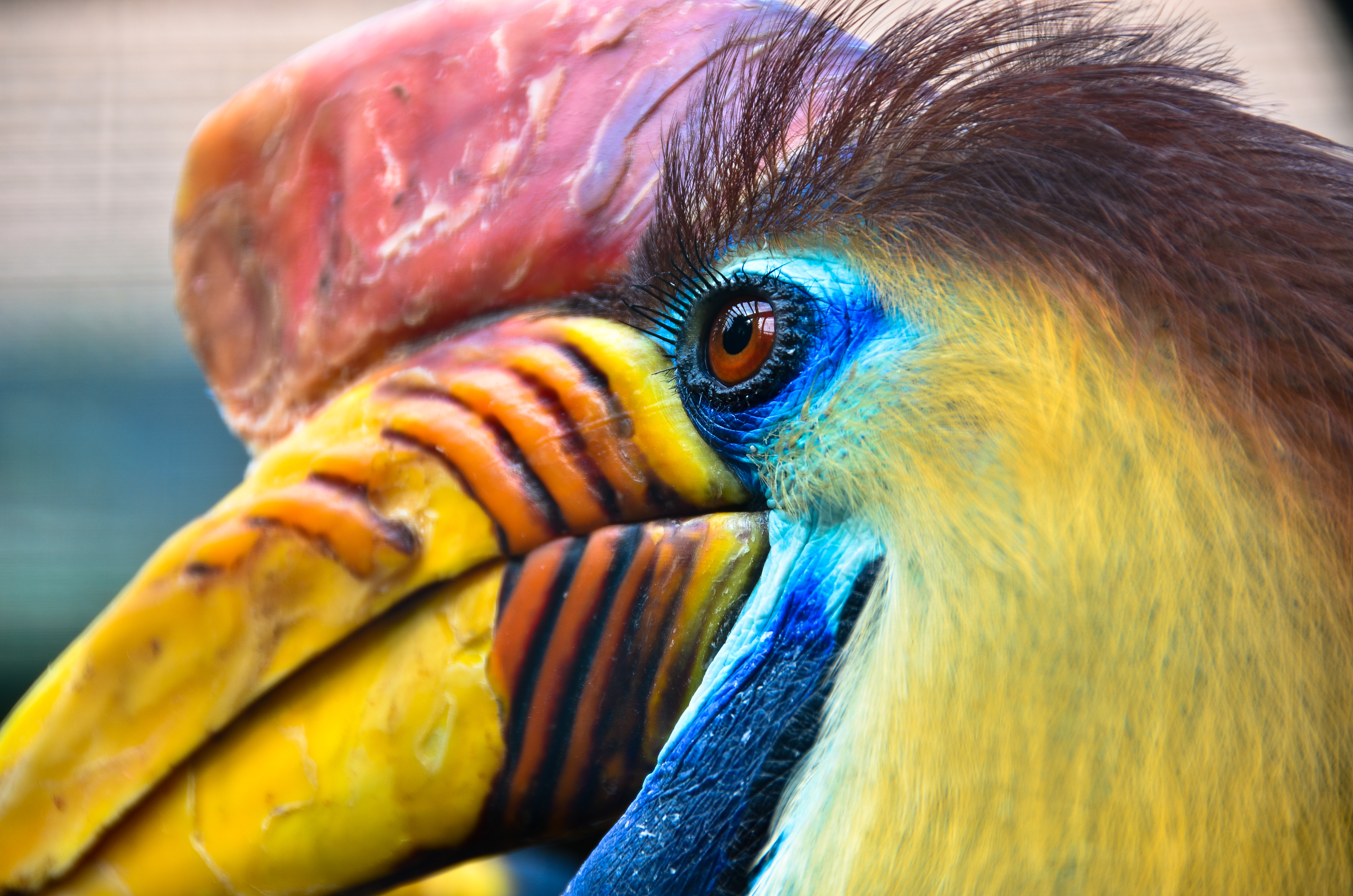
Knobbed hornbill

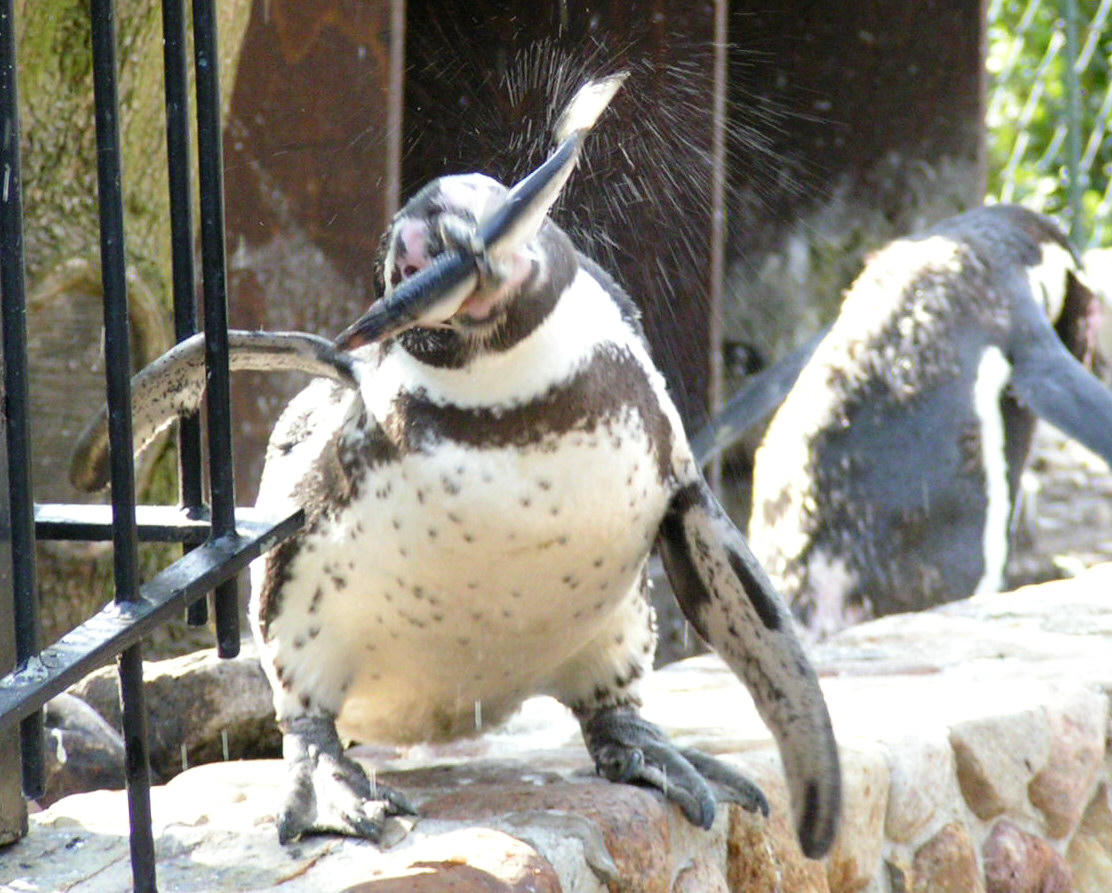
Penguin feeding time

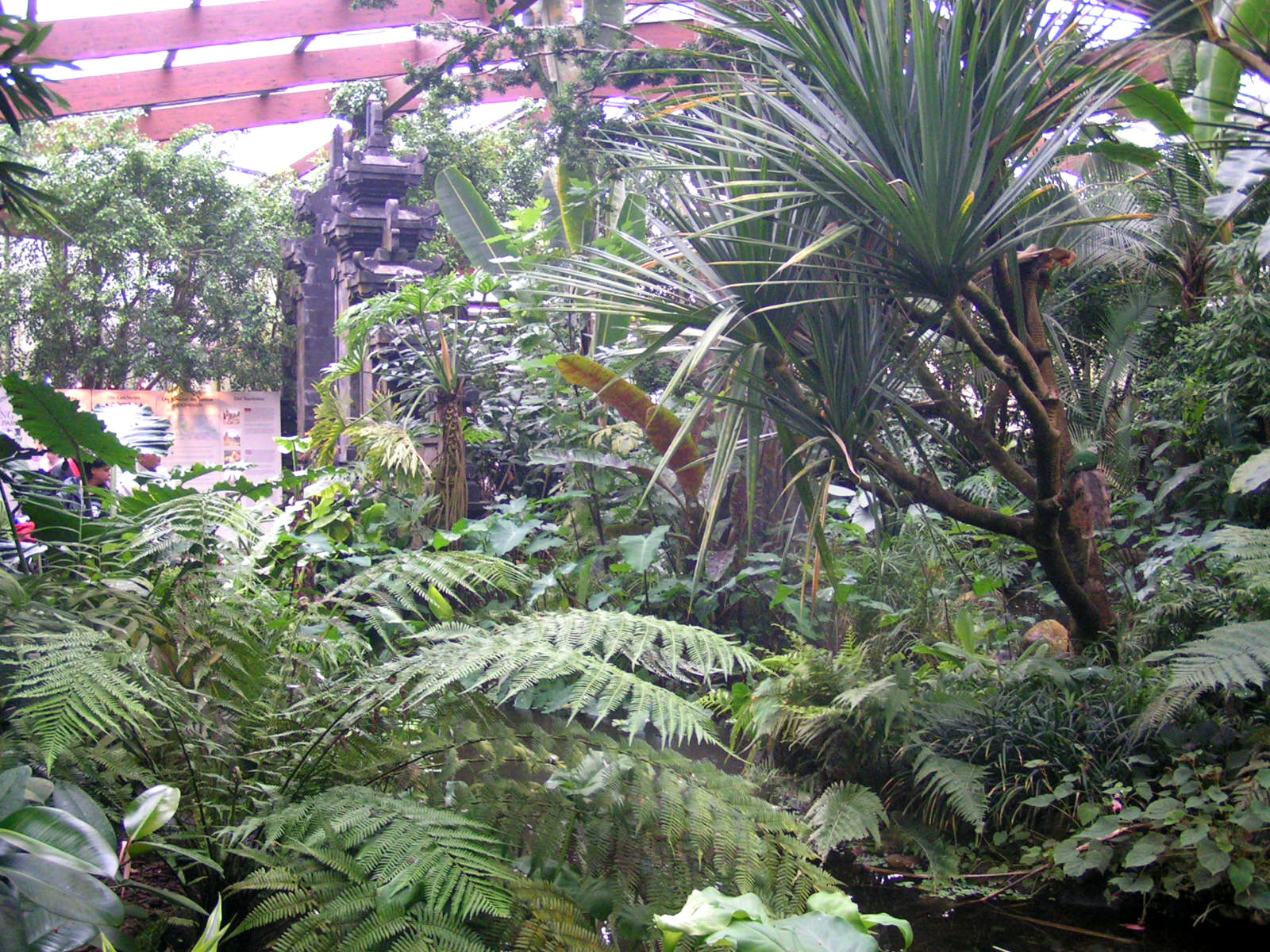
In the jungle hall

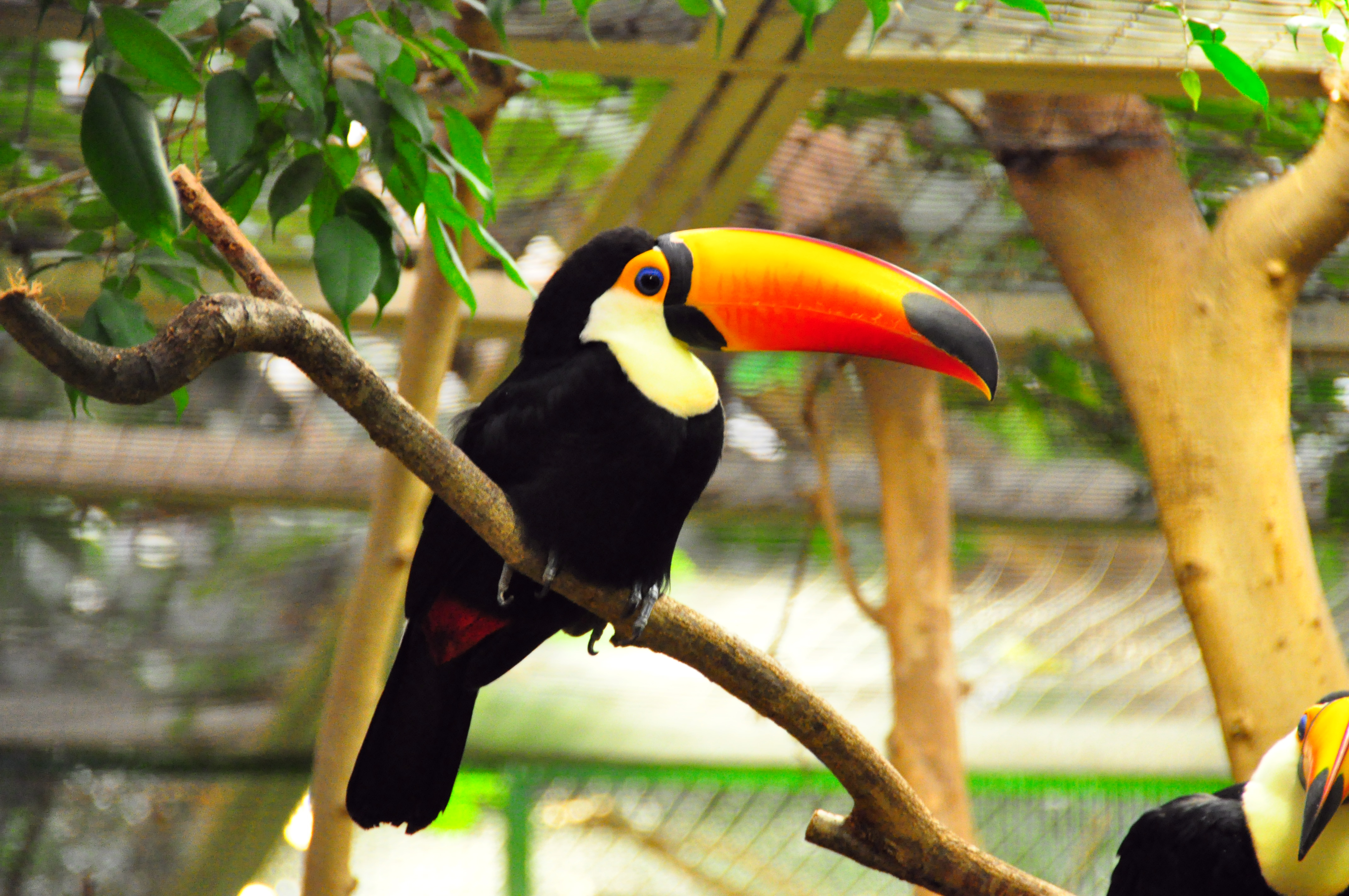
The toco toucan – mascot of the park

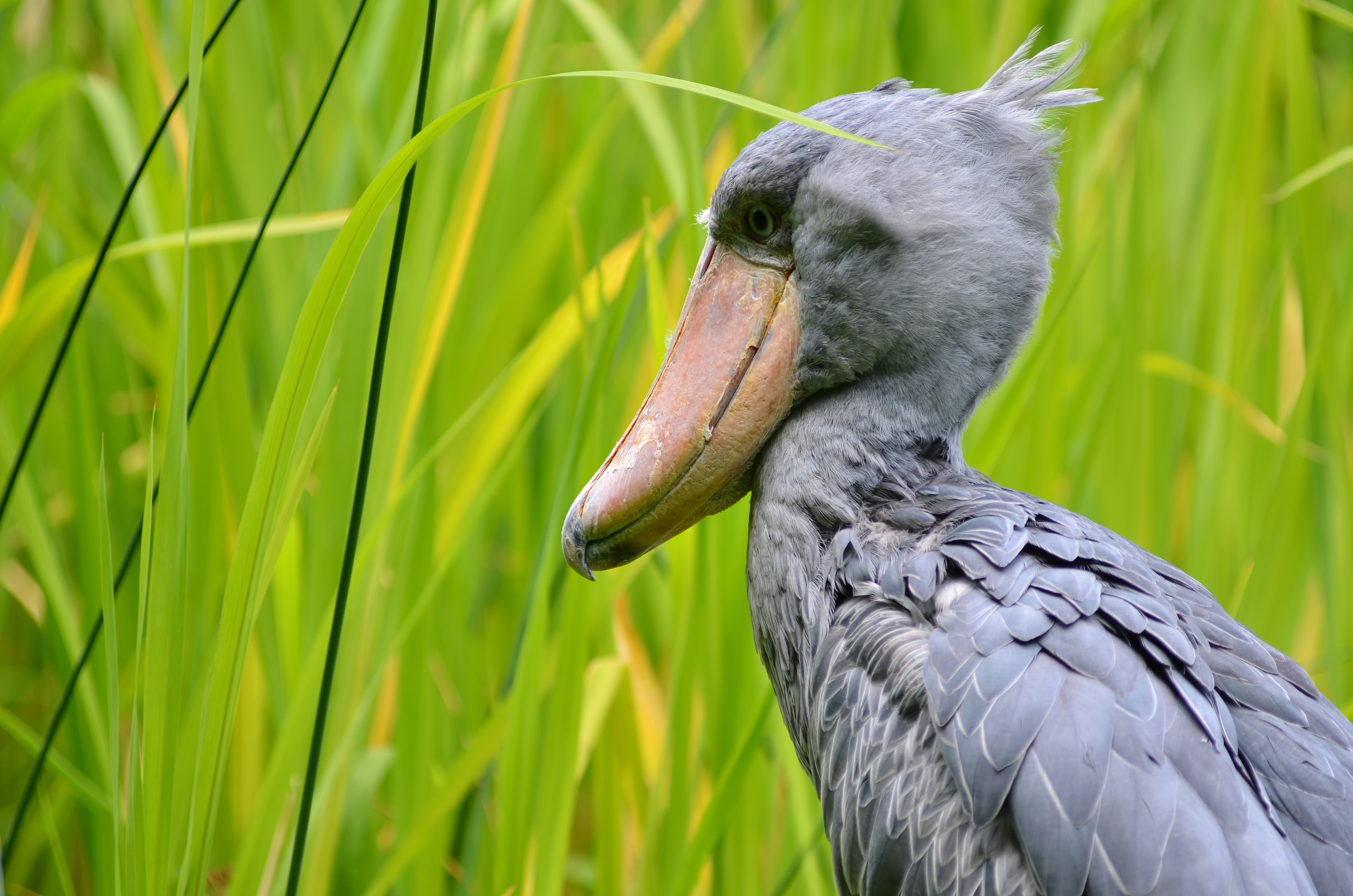
A shoebill on the lookout

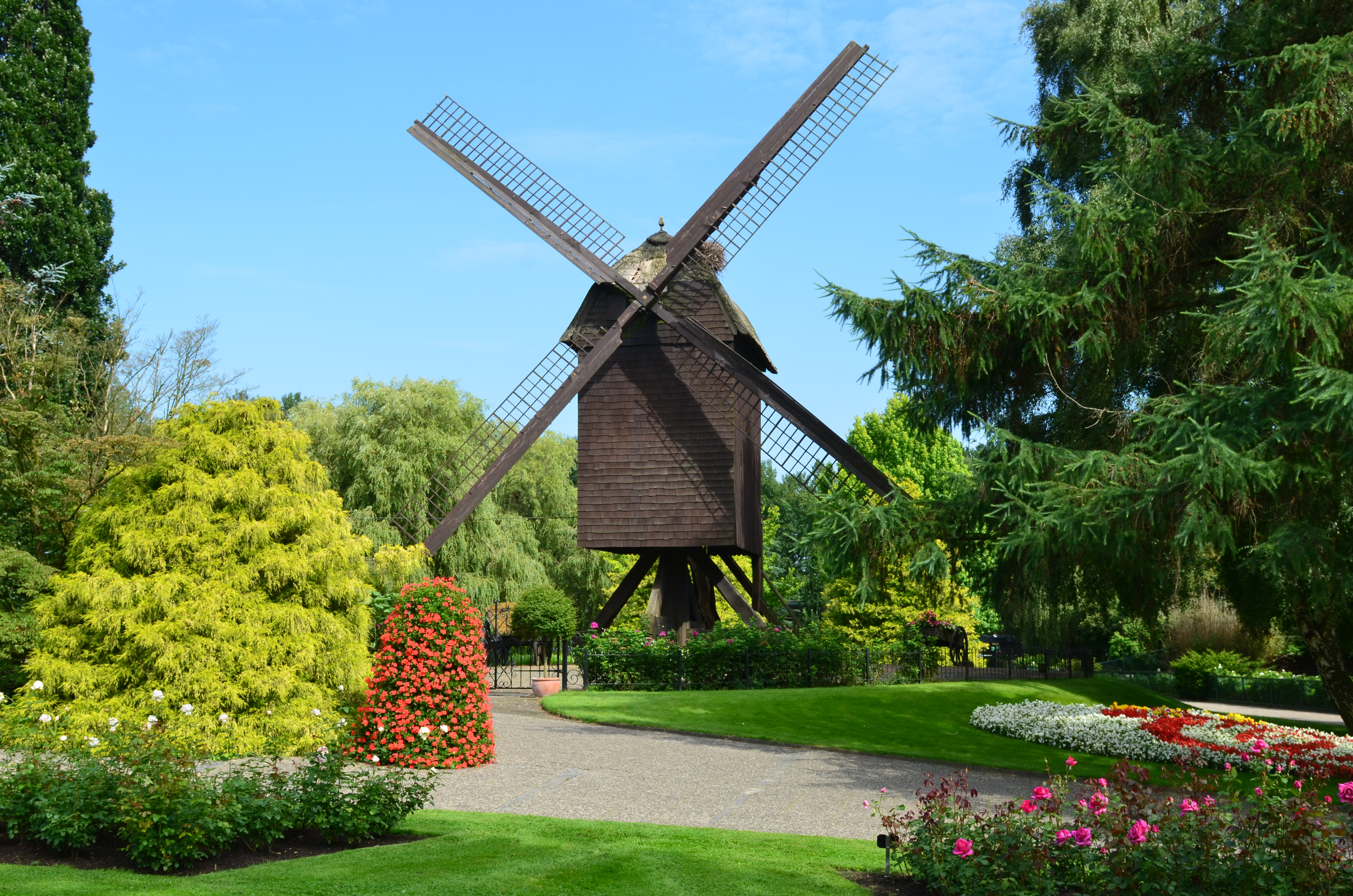
Post mill within the park

== Literature ==
- Vogelpark Walsrode - viel mehr als Vögel, (ed.: Vogelpark Walsrode), o.O. o.J. (31. A.), 162 p. with numerous illustrations.
- Wir entdecken die Vögel (Wieso? Weshalb? Warum?), Patricia Mennen (Autorin) & Anne Ebert (Illustrator), Ravensburger Buchverlag, ISBN 978-3-473-32831-4
- Wir entdecken die Vögel (Wieso? Weshalb? Warum?) [Audiobook] (Audio CD), Jumbo Neue Medien & Verlag GmbH, ISBN 978-3-8337-2620-0
