= GDT =

GDT may refer to:

== Trails ==
- Great Dividing Trail, in Victoria, Australia
- Great Divide Trail, in the Canadian Rocky Mountains

== Science and technology ==
- Gas discharge tube
- Gas Dynamic Trap, a Russian magnetic mirror used for fusion power research
- Geometric dimensioning and tolerancing, GD&T
- Global Descriptor Table, an x86 data structure
- Global distance test, to compare proteins
- Ground Data Terminal
- GDT or Gerätedatentransfer, a medical data format; see xDT

== Other uses ==
- Ganvsig daighix tongiong pingimv, a romanization system for Taiwanese Minnan
- Goal-directed therapy, in critical care medicine
- Grand dictionnaire terminologique, an online terminological database
- JAGS McCartney International Airport, Turks and Caicos Islands
- Kungardutyi language
- MaK GDT, a diesel railbus
- Guillermo del Toro, director
