= V50 =

V50 or V-50 may refer to:

== Automobiles ==
- Lambretta V50 Special, an Italian scooter
- Toyota Vista (V50), a sedan
- Volvo V50, a station wagon
- Yamaha V50 (motorcycle)

== Other uses ==
- DB Class V 50, a German locomotive
- Kamov V-50, a helicopter project
- LG V50 ThinQ, a smartphone
- Vanadium-50, an isotope of vanadium
- Yamaha V50 (music workstation)
