= Altenboitzen =

- Ortsteil of Walsrode
- Interactive map of Altenboitzen
- Location within Germany Location within Lower Saxony
- Coordinates: 52°49′0.55″N 9°30′55.38″E
- Country: Germany
- State: Lower Saxony
- District: Heidekreis
- Town: Walsrode

Area
  - Total: 6.8 km^{2} (2.6 sq mi)
- Elevation: 31 m (102 ft)

Population
  - Total: 350
  - Density: 51/km^{2} (130/sq mi)
- Time zone: UTC+01:00 (CET)
  - Summer (DST): UTC+02:00 (CEST)
- Postal codes: 29664
- Dialling codes: 05166

Altenboitzen is a village within the borough of Walsrode in Heidekreis district in the German state of Lower Saxony. Formerly an independent municipality, it is part of Walsrode since 1974.

== Location ==
The village lies southwest of the town on the Lüneburg Heath. The Jordanbach stream flows through Altenboitzen and continues in a southwesterly direction before discharging into the River Böhme.

== Road names ==
Altenboitzen has no road names, only house numbers.

== Politics ==
The municipal administrator (Ortsvorsteher) is Stephan Rengstorf.

== Points of interest ==
- In 2001 Altenboitzen was voted as one of the most beautiful villages in Lower Saxony in the competition Unser Dorf hat Zukunft ("Our Village Has a Future").
- The village is on the Verden to Walsrode railway, which was established in 1910, and which is operated by the Verden-Walsroder Eisenbahn company. It was also known as the Jordan-Bomlitz Railway between Bomlitz and Altenboitzen.
