= VWE =

VWE may refer to:

- Variable-width encoding
- Verden–Walsrode Railway in Germany
- Van Wyck Expressway in New York City
