= Vehmsmoor =

Coordinates: 52.862601°N 9.494762°E

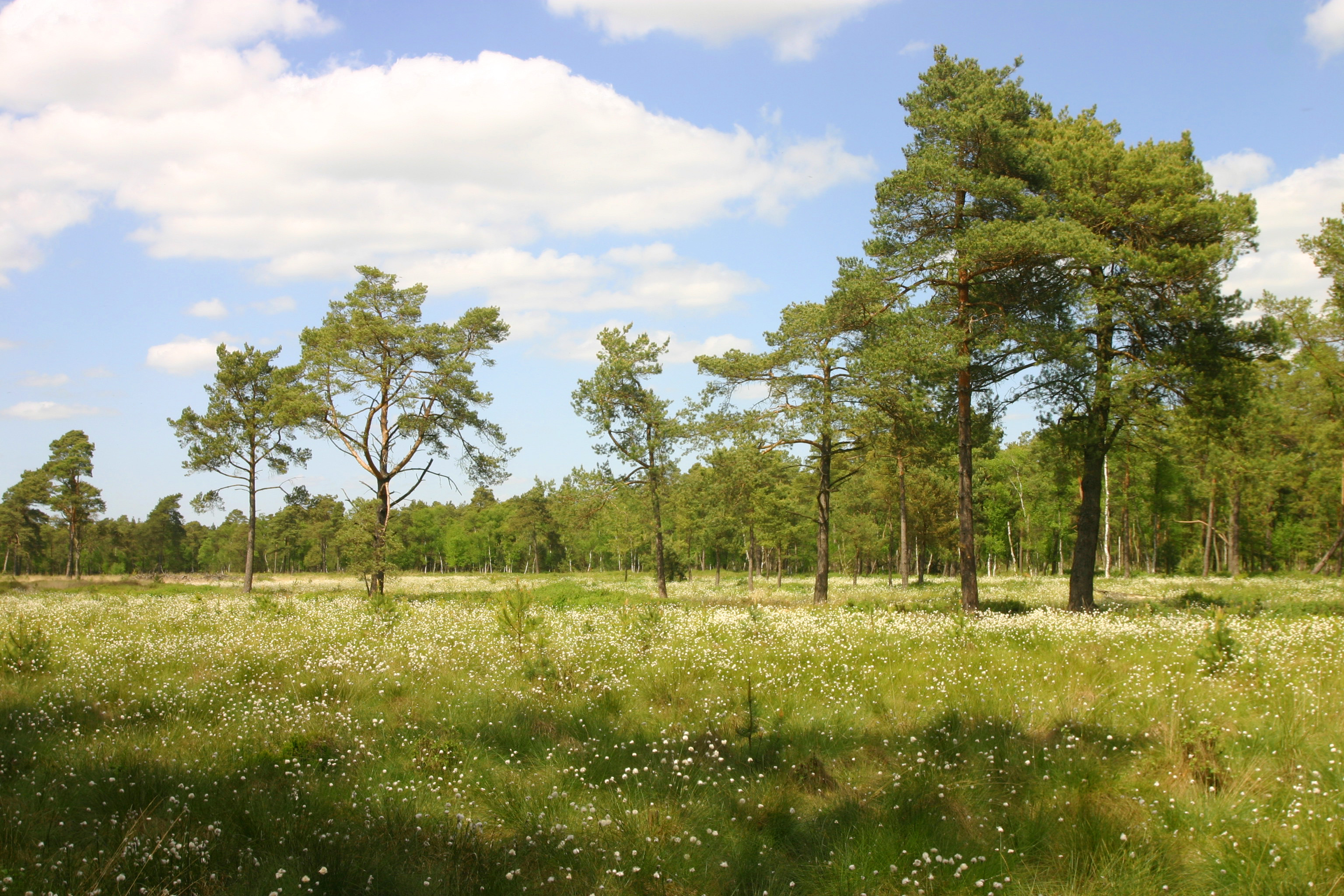
Vehmsmoor

The Vehmsmoor is a nature reserve in North Germany. It is located in the borough of Walsrode within the district of Soltau-Fallingbostel in Lower Saxony. Its classification number is NSG LÜ 182.

== Description ==
The Vehmsmoor has an area of 255 hectares (630 acres) and lies between the villages Fulde und Vethem in the borough of Walsrode, three kilometres west of the town centre of Walsrode and two kilometres south of the A 27 motorway.

The Jordanbach, a tributary of the Böhme, drains the Vehmsmoor.

Peat was cut in the raised bog for centuries. Today it is covered by a birch-pine carr (Bruchwald). Some vegetation of a raised bog nature still exists, consisting mainly of cottongrass, cranberries, heather, sundew and, in the peat cuttings, peat moss. Moor grass dominates the area. The crane is breeding again in the area.

== History ==
On 25 May 1990 the Vehmsmoor was legally designated as a nature reserve. The district of Soltau-Fallingbostel is responsible for it as the subordinate conservation authority.

== See also ==
- Nature reserves in Lower Saxony
