= Krauss-Maffei ML 500 C =

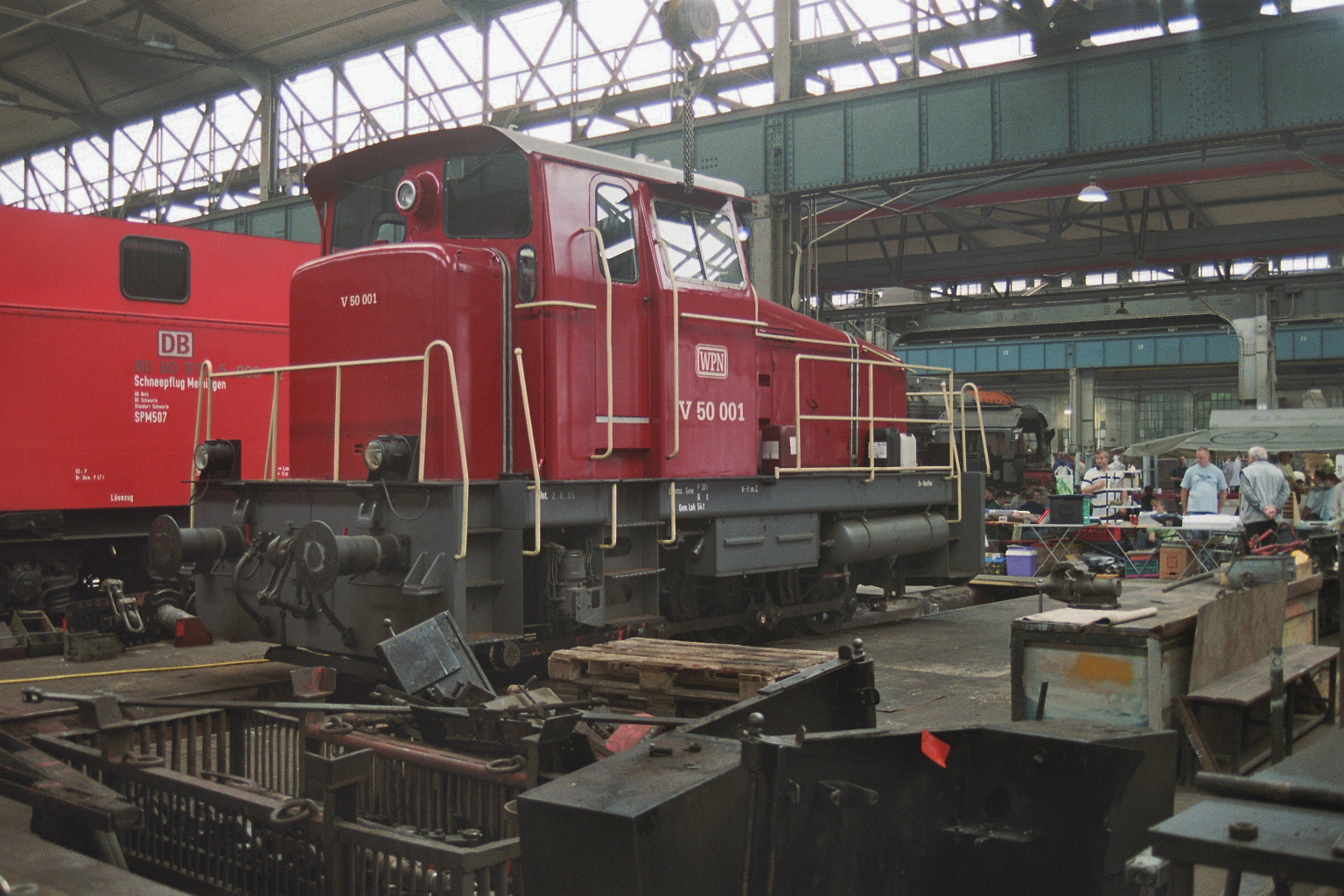
Type and origin
- Power type: Diesel-hydraulic
- Builder: Krauss-Maffei
- Build date: 1954–1966
- Total produced: 56
Specifications
- Configuration
  - Whyte: 6wDH
  - UIC: C
- Gauge: 1,435 mm (4 ft 8 1/2 in)
- Wheel diameter: 1,100 m (3,608 ft 11 1/8 in)
- Minimum curve: 50 m (160 ft)
- Wheelbase: 3.000 m (9 ft 10 1/8 in)
- Length
  - Over buffers: 8.400 m (27 ft 6 3/4 in)
- Width: 3.100 m (10 ft 2 in)
- Height: 4.190 m (13 ft 9 in)
- Axle load: 16–18 t (16–18 long tons; 18–20 short tons)
- Service weight: 48–54 t (47–53 long tons; 53–60 short tons)
- Fuel type: Diesel fuel
- Fuel capacity: 1,300 L (290 imp gal; 340 US gal)
- Prime mover: MB 836 Bb
- RPM
  - Maximum RPM: 1500 rpm
- Engine type: 4 stroke, 6 cylinder in-line engine
- Aspiration: Diesel exhaust driven supercharger
- Transmission: Hydraulic
Performance figures
- Maximum speed: 29 km/h (18 mph) / 58 km/h (36 mph)
- Power output: 500 PS (368 kW; 493 hp)
Career
- Numbers: DB: V 50 001 – V 50 002

The Krauss-Maffei ML 500 C industrial and works locomotive was built between 1954 and 1966 by Krauss-Maffei.

When the Wilhelmsburg Industrial Railway (Wilhelmsburger Industriebahn) was taken in 1962 two units ended up in the Deutsche Bundesbahn fleet and were incorporated in it as DB Class V 50. Because there were sufficient Class V 60 locomotives available at that time, the two 'loners' were sold in 1964.

No. V 50 001 joined the Verden-Walsrode Railway Company, which re-sold it in 1983 to the track construction firm of NEWAG. In 1995 it was bought by the Scheufelen Oberlenningen paper factory. In 2003 the Württemberg Private Railway Museum at Nürtingen (WPN) took over the former works engine. It is now stationed at Neuffen and is operated by the Railway Vehicle Preservation Company (Gesellschaft zur Erhaltung von Schienenfahrzeugen) or GES.

== See also ==
- Deutsche Bundesbahn
- List of DB locomotives and railbuses
