= Heide Express =

Special heritage railway service

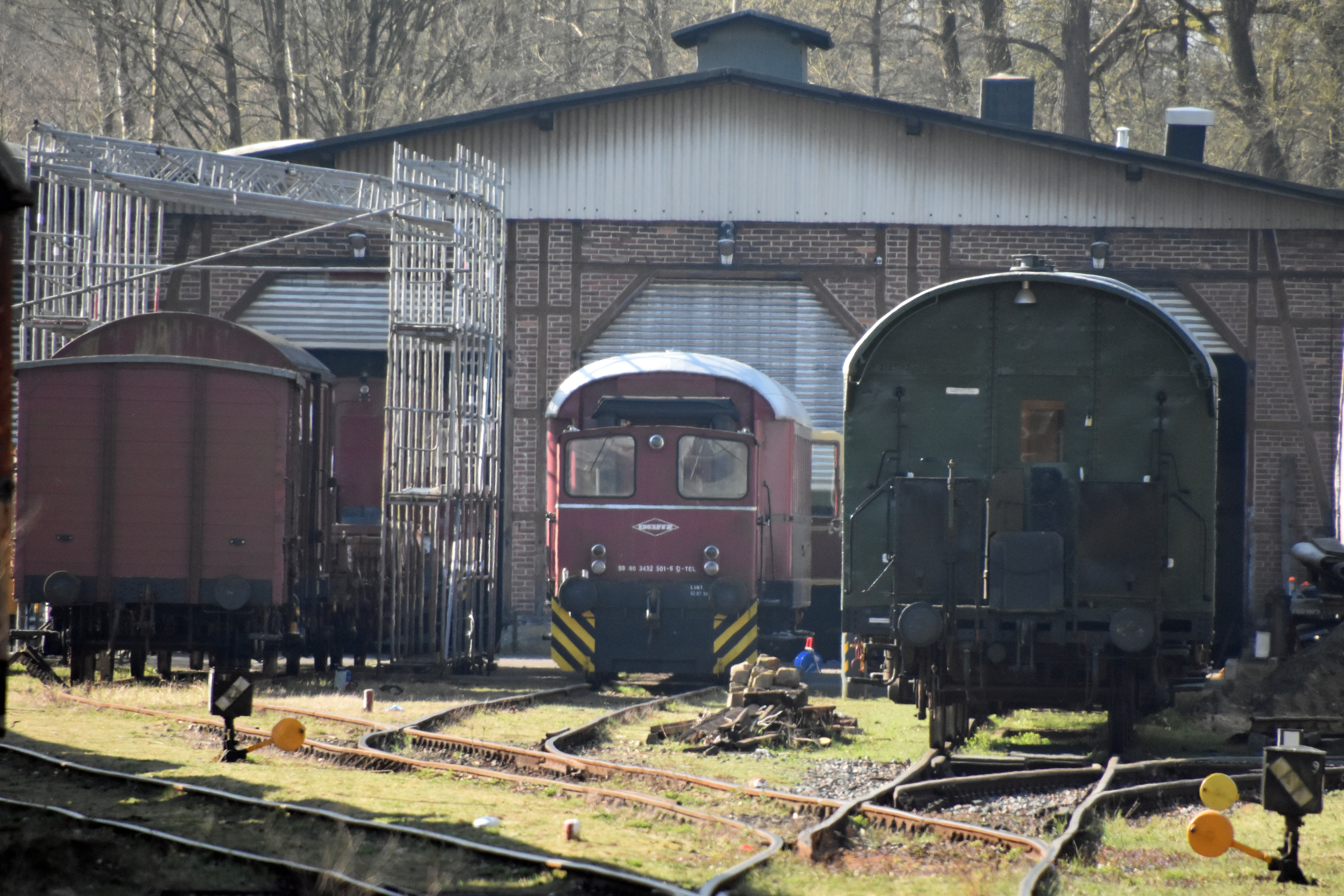
Depot of Heide-Express

The Heide Express (literally: "Heath Express") is the name used by the Lüneburg Transport Society (Arbeitsgemeinschaft Verkehrsfreunde Lüneburg) or AVL to market special railway trips with their historic trains on the East Hanoverian Railways (OHE) railway network in northern Germany.

== Activities ==
In addition to running special trains, the society organises presentations, model railway swapmeets, film showings and exhibitions, usually in Lüneburg. These are accompanied by excursions.

=== Operations today ===
The Heide Express operates today on the OHE lines around Lüneburg, Winsen, Soltau and Celle as well as Walsrode. Services operate irregularly several times a year and, in the summer months for special occasions. There are no regular weekend services as, for example, on the Moor Express.

The following routes are operated:

- Winsen (Luhe)–Niedermarschacht (with bus connexions to the Geesthacht Railway Society)
- Winsen (Luhe)–Salzhausen–Hützel
- Lüneburg–Bleckede (–Waldfrieden)
- Lüneburg Süd–Amelinghausen–Hützel (some run to Soltau)
- Celle–Hankensbüttel–Wittingen
- Celle–Beckedorf–Hermannsburg–Müden (Örtze)
- Walsrode–Bomlitz
- Walsrode–Altenboitzen

In cooperation with other societies the AVL's rolling stock is used for special trains on other lines. They appear regularly in the Hamburg region.

== Rolling stock ==
The AVL's rolling stock is used in various combinations. The Heide Express trains are mainly hauled by the V46-01 (from Lüneburg) or the DL 0601 (from Winsen) using train rakes composed of Umbauwagen and platform coaches, or they just use the GDT 0518 railbus.

=== Locomotives and railbuses ===
Vehicle	Operating number	Class	Remarks
Locomotor (Kleinlok)	1	Deutz LM216R	Monument
Locomotor (Kleinlok)	2	Deutz KS55 B	Shunter
Diesel locomotive	5	LHB S200	in storage
Line locomotive	V 46-01	MaK 600 D	
Line locomotive	D.L. 00601	WR 200 B	
Railbus	DT 0504	Diesel railbus (Gotha)	
Railbus	GDT 0515	MaK GDT	Used to provide spare-parts
Railbus	GDT 0518	MaK GDT	

=== Passenger coaches ===
Coach	Operating number	Class
Passenger coach Amelinghausen	0002	B3yg
Passenger coach Lüneburg	0003	B3yg
Passenger coach Bleckede	0004	B3yg
Buffet car Egestorf	0005	BR3yg
Passenger coach Scharnebeck	0006	B3yg
Passenger coach	0011	Ci (Donnerbüchse)
Buffet car	0012	CRi (Donnerbüchse)
Passenger coach Winsen / Luhe	0016	AB3yg
Dining car	0200	WRge
Passenger coach	0021	Ci (Donnerbüchse)
Passenger coach	0022	Ci (Donnerbüchse)
Passenger coach	0023	Ci (Donnerbüchse)
Passenger coach	0034	B3yg
Business car	0115	Pw4ü-30
Railbus trailer	0304	------
Business car	1990	Bpw 4

=== Goods wagons and special wagons ===
Wagon	Operating number	Type
Workshop wagon	0109	Post-mr/a
Luggage van	0110	Pw
Luggage van	0115	-----
Luggage van	0125	Pwgs
Luggage van	0138	OHE Pwi
Covered goods wagon	1007	Gls 205
Tank wagon	1013	Z
Covered goods wagon	1017	Glmns
Covered goods wagon	1018	Ghs
Tank wagon	1019	Z
Goods wagon	1029	G
Flat wagon	1150	X
Flat wagon	1151	X
Covered goods wagon	1054	G
Covered goods wagon	1168	G
Flat wagon	1171	X
Flat wagon	1173	X
Stake wagon	1169	Rklmm

Some services also use locomotives owned by the East Hanoverian Railways. This is especially the case for trips in the Celle area.
