= MaK GDT =

German railway built in 1953

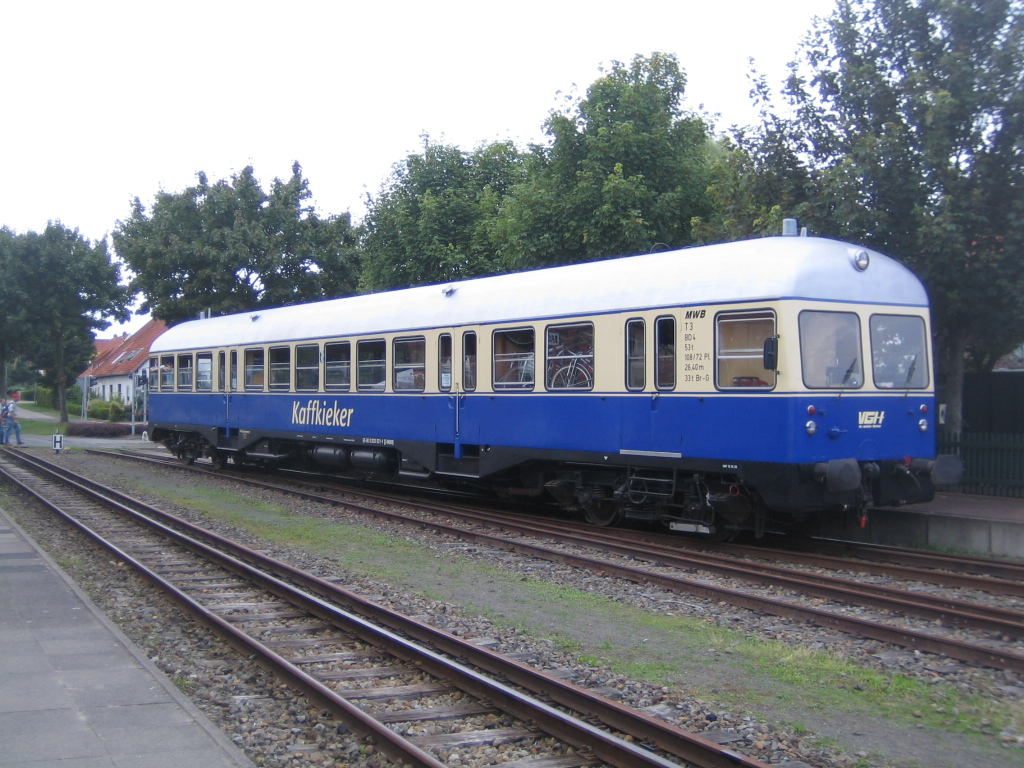
- T 3 of the MWB in Bruchhausen-Vilsen
- Manufacturer: MaK
- Constructed: 1953–1961
- Number built: 13

Specifications
- Car length: 26,400 mm (86 ft 7 3/8 in) over buffers
- Width: 2,825 mm (9 ft 3 1/4 in)
- Height: 4,050 mm (13 ft 3 7/16 in)
- Wheel diameter: 950 mm (3 ft 1 3/8 in)
- Maximum speed: 70–75 km/h (43–47 mph)
- Weight: 36.0–41.0 t (35.4–40.4 long tons; 39.7–45.2 short tons)
- Prime mover: Deutz A8L614
- Traction motors: Two
- Power output: 2×145 PS (143.0 hp); 2×220 PS (217.0 hp); 2×230 PS (226.9 hp)
- UIC classification: (1A)′(A1)′
- Track gauge: 1,435 mm (4 ft 8 1/2 in)

The MaK GDT is a large-volume diesel railbus (German: Großraum-Dieseltriebwagen or GDT) that was first built in 1953 for private railways in Germany.

== History ==
The GDT was developed in the early 1950s by Maschinenbau Kiel for light and private railways. Eleven units were built as driving cars (Triebwagen or VT) for north German private lines.

The Danish railway company Odsherreds Jernbane was supplied by MaK with two similar vehicles in 1961. These were designated as Mo 25 and Mo 26; they had 66 seats, were fitted with gangway connections and had a top speed of 120 km/h (75 mph).

The firm based the coach bodies on the design of the centre-door coaches of the Deutsche Bundesbahn. The engines each drove an inside axle on the bogie; only on the VT 81 delivered to the Kiel–Segeberg Light Railway (Kleinbahn Kiel–Segeberg) did the engines drive both bogie axles.

== MaK railbuses of private German railway companies ==
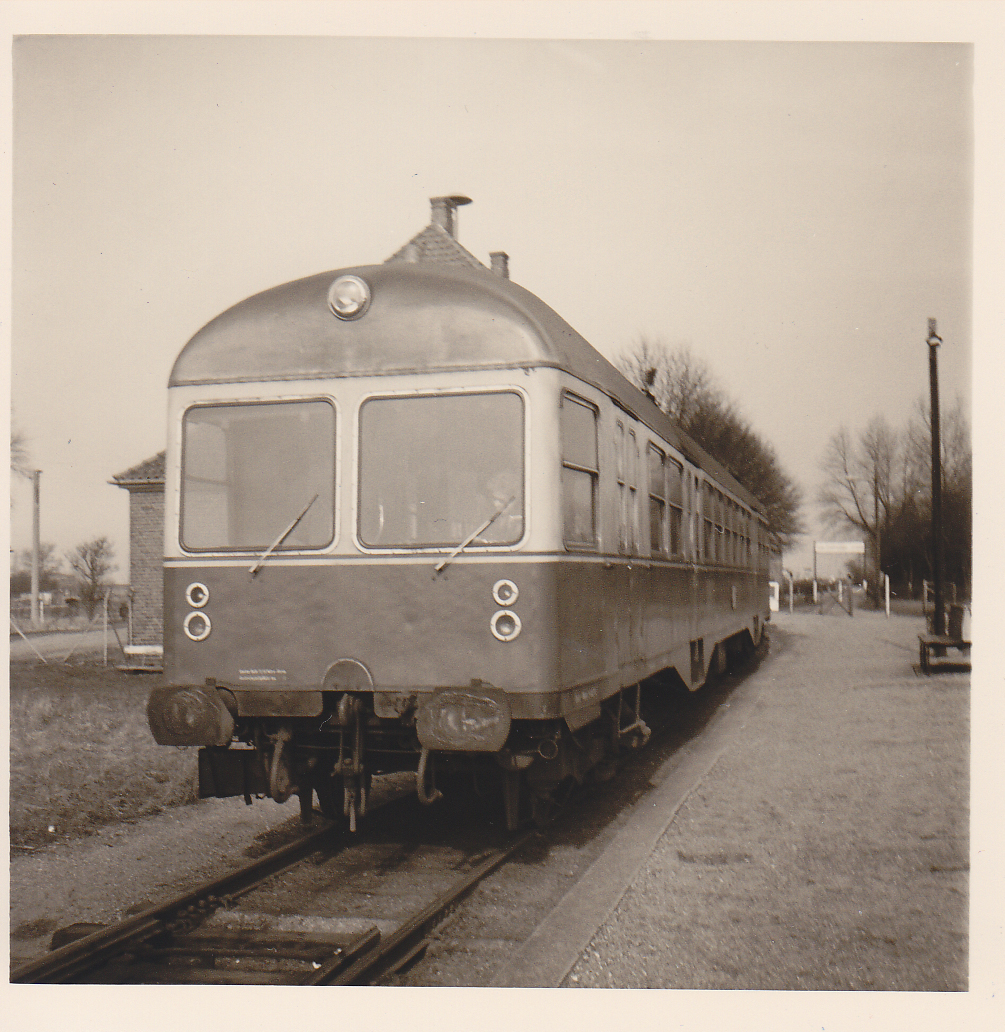
1974 Station "Schönberger Strand"

The railbuses were delivered to the following railways:

- Kiel-Schönberg Railway (Kiel-Schönberger Eisenbahn) (one unit)
- Kiel-Segeberg Railway (Kiel-Segeberger Eisenbahn) (two units)
- East Hanoverian Railways (Osthannoversche Eisenbahnen) (seven units)
- North Frisian Transport (Nordfriesische Verkehrsbetriebe) (one unit).

Following the withdrawal of passenger services the railbuses were sold to south German railways or to Italy. After the six railbuses had been decommissioned in Italy, there were bought in 2000 by the Lüneburg Railway Society (Arbeitsgemeinschaft Verkehrsfreunde Lüneburg or AVL) and brought back to Germany. Only one vehicle has been scrapped to date, the others still exist, some in working order. In some examples the engine was removed and they were only used as trailer cars. In 2010 the following are working:

- VT 21 of the Prignitz Railway, (Prignitzer Eisenbahn), sold to the Westphalian Localbahn, (Westfälische Localbahn), ex OHE GDT 0517
- GDT 0518 of the AVL, ex OHE GDT 0518
- T3 of the Mittelweserbahn, ex OHE GDT 0520.

== Gallery ==
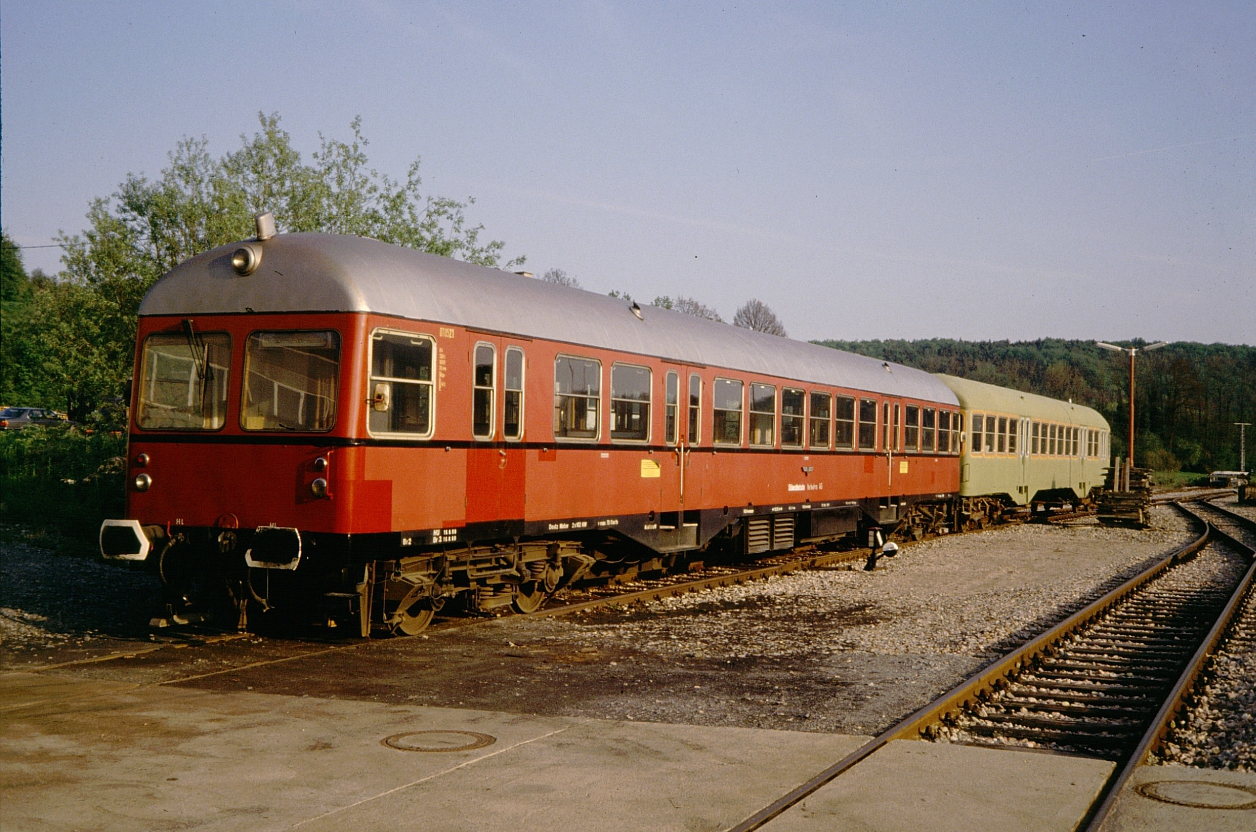
VT 521 of the SWEG in Menzingen shed
