= Bomlitz–Walsrode railway =

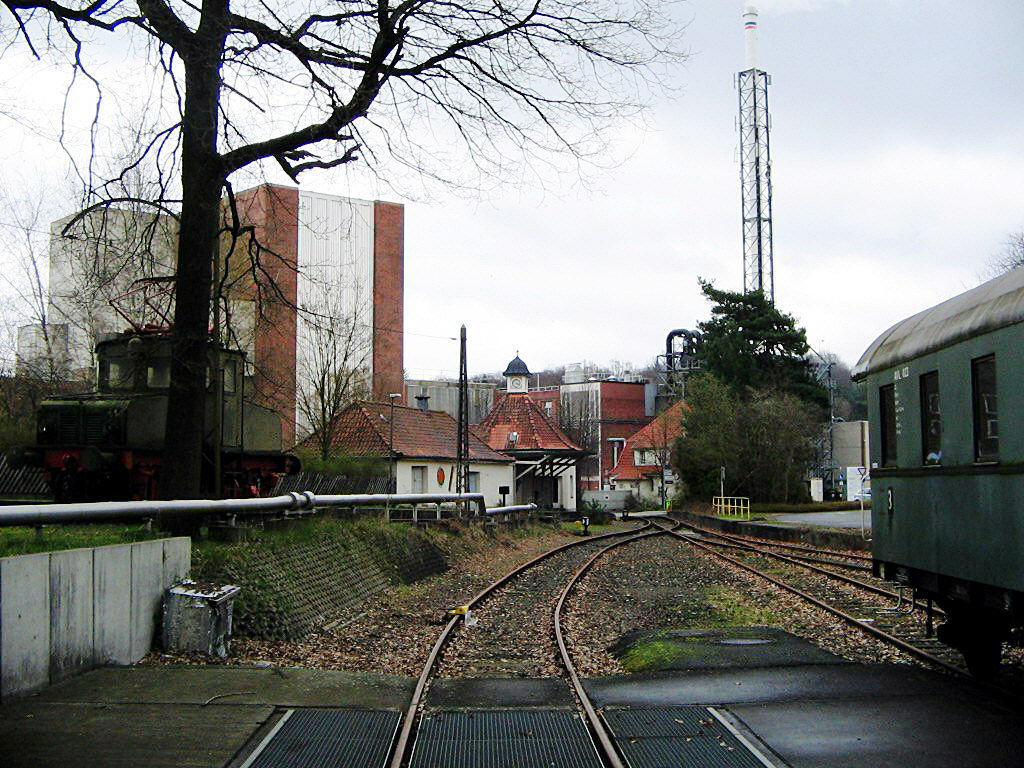
- Bomlitz–Walsrode railway

Overview
- Line number: 1712 (Walsrode–Cordingen)

Service
- Route number: to 1991: 163 ex 217g

Technical
- Track gauge: 1,435 mm (4 ft 8 1/2 in)
- Electrification: to 1976: 600 V DC

The Bomlitz–Walsrode railway is a railway line in the German state of Lower Saxony that is operated by the Osthannoversche Eisenbahnen (OHE).

== Route ==
- Bomlitz–Gleisdreieck (triangular junction)–Cordingen (old Wolff Walsrode industrial siding)
- Cordingen–Vogelpark–Walsrode (the former DB line from Walsrode to Visselhövede)

Working in close cooperation with the railway today is the Walsrode branch of the Verden-Walsrode Railway Company:

- Walsrode–Vorwalsrode–Hollige–Altenboitzen (line belonging to the Verden-Walsroder Eisenbahn, infrastructure only).

== History ==
The gunpowder manufacturing company Wolff & Co. (later Wolff Walsrode AG, now Dow Wolff Cellulosics) opened an industrial railway from Cordingen to Bomlitz on 15 May 1915; the track ran as far as Kiebitzort at opening and was completed in 1916. At first only one steam locomotive was employed, but after a short time the line was electrified to a 600 volt, direct current system. For that, three electric locomotives were used; they were joined by a fourth in 1943. From the 1930s diesel locomotives were also used to handle the growing levels of industrial traffic and, in 1940, a second-hand benzene-powered railbus was bought for passenger services between Bomlitz and Walsrode. In 1938 a junction between the industrial line and the Walsrode–Soltau railway was established at Honerdingen station. In 1944 the industrial lines had reached a total length of 31.6 kilometres (19.6 mi) but, after 1945, a large part of the network was dismantled. Now, instead of gunpowder, the factories in Bomlitz just produced cellulose products. From 1977 electrical railway operations at the factory site were reduced and, in 1979, completely closed down.

Until 31 May 1991 Wolff Walsrode's industrial line also handled limited through passenger services, which had been extended in 1942 to run through to Walsrode. In addition to the railbus there were also individual passenger coaches. Towards the end railway coaches were hired from the Deutsche Bundesbahn (DB). Because these became unavailable, in 1991 all passenger traffic was switched to buses and the timetable reduced to little more than school bus services.

Most of the freight traffic served the factory and later the Walsrode industrial estate. Even today 60,000 tonnes (130 million pounds) are transported on the line annually.

On 1 January 1997 Wolff bought the section of railway from Cordingen to Walsrode from the DB. Probis, a subsidiary of Dow Wolff Cellulosics, took over the infrastructure in 2002, and since 1 March 2002 the line has been operated by the Osthannoversche Eisenbahnen (OHE).

== Tourist traffic ==
As on many other OHE lines the Lüneburg Transport Society (Arbeitsgemeinschaft Verkehrsfreunde Lüneburg) runs occasional special trains using the Heide Express on this railway and the Walsrode section of the Verden-Walsroder Eisenbahn's Walsrode–Altenboitzen line. The Bomlitz–Altenboitzen section is also called the Jordan-Bomlitz Railway, because it runs along the valley of the Jordanbach stream into the Bomlitz valley.

== Literature ==
- Gerd Wolff: Deutsche Klein- und Privatbahnen. Band 10: Niedersachsen 2. Zwischen Weser und Elbe. EK-Verlag, Freiburg 2007, S. 209–219, ISBN 978-3-88255-669-8
