= Verden–Walsrode Railway =

Railway line in Germany

Verden–Walsrode Nord

Overview
- Line number: 9140 (Verden–Stemmen), 9141 (Böhme–Walsrode)

Service
- Route number: 215h (Verden–Stemmen), 210b (Böhme–Walsrode)

Technical
- Line length: 38.5 km
- Track gauge: 1,435 mm

The Verden–Walsrode Railway (German: Verden-Walsroder Eisenbahn) or VWE is a transport company with its headquarters in Verden on the River Aller in North Germany.

== History ==
The Verden-Walsroder Eisenbahn (VWE) was founded as the Kleinbahn Verden-Walsrode with its base in Verden. Almost three quarters of its assets were taken over by the Prussian state and the Province of Hanover; the rest was divided between the districts of Verden and Fallingbostel and a few municipalities. Later the state and province pulled out of the company. Today the main shareholder is the district of Verden with 69% of the capital; others include the town of Verden, the district of Soltau-Fallingbostel and the town of Kirchlinteln.

On 2 March 1911 the line between Verden and Walsrode was opened and, on 17 December 1910, passenger and goods services were running on the section between Verden and Altenboitzen, three days later they ran as far as Vorwalsrode.

As well as opening up the predominantly rural region, the railway played an important role in transporting potash from the area near Groß and Klein Häuslingen until 1924. Attempts were made from 1924 to 1959 to compensate for the loss of this freight commodity - and its associated profits - by transferring ownership of the line to the Hanover State Narrow Gauge Railway Office (Landeskleinbahnamt Hannover). Because this measure was not enough however, a third of the route - namely the section between Stemmen and Böhme – was closed on 2 November 1936 and the tracks lifted.

Not until after the Second World War did the situation for the railway improve, not least through the transportation of oil in the area. Consideration was even given to rebuilding the dismantled section. In 1959 running powers were taken over from the renamed and now defunct Lower Saxon State Railway Office. But passengers opted more and more for road transportation, because the through connexion from Verden to Walsrode had not been re-established. On 2 March 1931 the company took its first bus route into service. As a result of that through passenger services between Verden and Walsrode were able to be reinstated. On 30 May 1964 rail services on the eastern section from Böhme to Walsrode (timetable number 9141) were entirely replaced by buses and on 27 September 1969 the western section from Verden to Stemmen (timetable number 9140) followed suit. In 1970 the Deutsche Bundesbahn took over goods services on the Walsrode–Böhme section, but the infrastructure still belongs to the VWE. Since 1996 locomotives belonging to the Werkbahn Bomlitz have handled goods traffic under contract to the Deutsche Bahn AG, and since 2002 locomotives have been supplied by the OHE. This only runs as far as Altenboitzen however; goods traffic between Altenboitzen and Böhme had been withdrawn in 1990. The VWE also provides shunting services in the DB stations of Verden and Nienburg. The VWE is a member of the Bremen-Lower Saxony Railway Network (Eisenbahnnetzwerk Bremen-Niedersachsen).

== Running stock ==
From 1964 to 1983 a diesel locomotive of the Krauss-Maffei ML 500 C class was used which had been purchased second-hand from the Deutsche Bundesbahn.

== Verden Transport Company ==
The Verden Transport Company (Verdener Verkehrsgesellschaft) or VVG) is a 100% subsidiary of the VWE and runs the public transport in Verden und Kirchlinteln using buses.

Performance: 1,258,177 passengers over 617,927 km (2000).

The VVG and the VWE are partners in the Bremen/Lower Saxony Transport Network (Verkehrsverbund Bremen/Niedersachsen or VBN).

== Museum railway operations ==
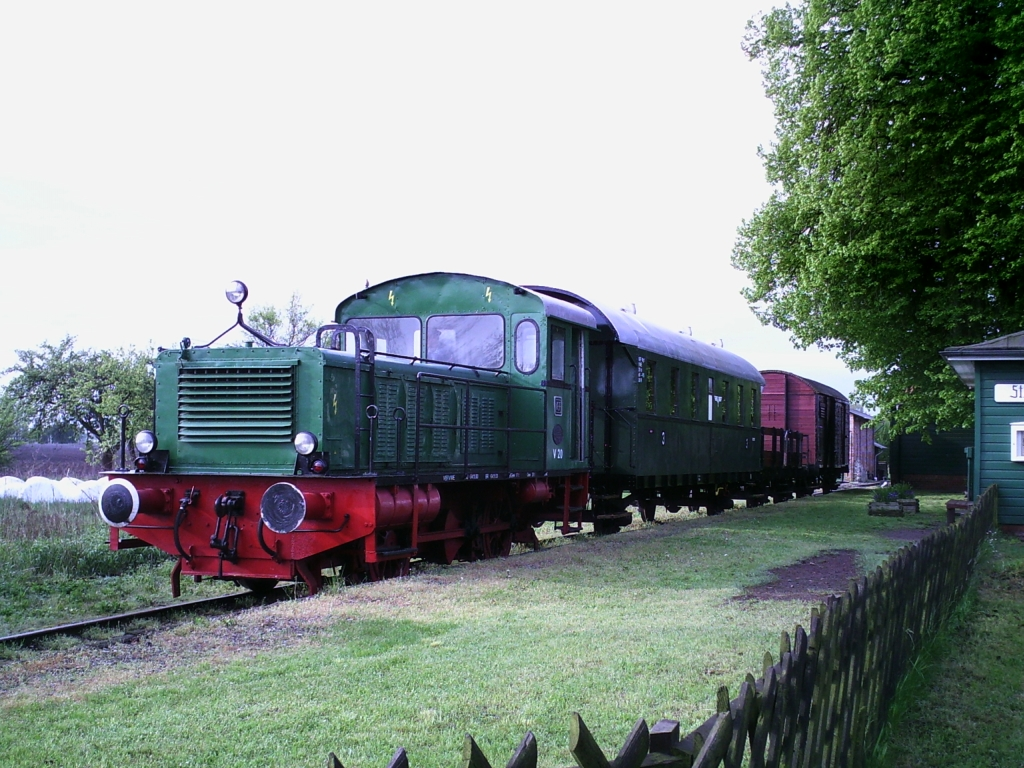
VEF museum train

The Verden Railway Society (Verdener Eisenbahnfreunde) was founded on 20 March 1989. Initially it was intended to operate a museum railway on the former DB route from Verden to Rethem, which is why they chose the station at Hülsen on the line as their base. But they soon decided, as a result of another pending line closure, to open discussions with the Verden-Walsroder Eisenbahn about using the 12 km long narrow gauge line from Verden-Süd to Stemmen. After a successful conclusion to these negotiations the museum train, bought from the Weserbergland Steam Railway (Dampfeisenbahn Weserbergland), comprising the former VWE diesel engine, no. 241 (now V 11) and three trailer cars, was moved to Verden. The old Deutz diesel engine did not get its operating licence however. As a substitute the VWE diesel engine DL2 (Gmeinder, built in 1947) was hired. The engine, now designated as V 20, then hauled museum trains from 1993. It was joined at about the same time by another diesel, no. V 22 Magdeburger, a former East German DR Class V 22. The V 22 was refurbished in order to act as a substitute when V 20 went in for its general inspection. When in 2000 the V 20 was accepted, now belonging to the railway society, it was placed in timetabled service again. Since then the train formation has also changed, the trailer cars gave way to coaches with end platforms. The introduction of a Donnerbüchse coach (number 1) in 2005 finally rendered the use of the last trailer car, TA 10, superfluous. This left Verden at the beginning of 2006, in order to act as an extra wagon for the Lüneburg Railway Society (AVL).

The first years of the museum railway society was characterised by restoring the stock they had purchased and getting them back into running order. The wagon fleet was consolidated, which led to several vehicles leaving the museum railway again. The current fleet roughly portrays the stock that would have been underway on narrow gauge railways in the 1950s. Today the volunteers of the society own four diesel engines, a diesel railbus, three coaches, a luggage van, four goods wagon and a hand-operated draisine. Of course not all the vehicles are working: one of the diesel locomotives is under restoration, another is operational. The railbus is currently being refurbished, two coaches, one goods wagon and the luggage van and draisine are on active duty transporting day trippers, cyclists and railway fans with increasing success at a relaxing pace through the Verden and Kirchlinteln countryside. In doing so, the museum railway has become an important tourist attraction.

The stations are also being refurbished. Platforms along the route are being rebuilt to their historic state, the station building at Stemme is being restored and many small historic 'gems' have been restored and can be seen today, such as a notice board for the former narrow gauge railway company, the Kleinbahn Verden-Walsrode, or an enamel plate advertising Mauxion Chocolate. So the museum railway is both a heritage railway and a type of stationary museum and shows how, in former years, the narrow gauge line, village and district town worked well together.

In 2007 the society was renamed to the Verden Railway Society and Verden–Walsrode Railway (Verdener Eisenbahnfreunde Kleinbahn Verden-Walsrode).

== Sources ==
- Auf Schienen durch den Kleinbahnbezirk - Mit der Kleinbahn Verden-Walsrode unterwegs (Verdener Eisenbahnfreunde, 1. Auflage 2007)
- Gerd Wolff: Deutsche Klein- und Privatbahnen. Band 10: Niedersachsen 2. Zwischen Weser und Elbe. EK-Verlag, Freiburg 2007, S. 185–209, ISBN 978-3-88255-669-8
