= Luss (disambiguation) =

Luss is a village on the bank of Loch Lomond, Scotland.

Luss or LUSS may also refer to:

- Lulin Sky Survey of near-Earth objects
- Dan Luss, American professor of chemical engineering
- Sasha Luss, Russian model and actress

== See also ==
- Central Lüß Plateau Heathland, a nature reserve in Germany
