= Südheide Nature Park =

Nature park in Lower Saxony, Germany

Coordinates: 52°48.38′N 10°10.73′E

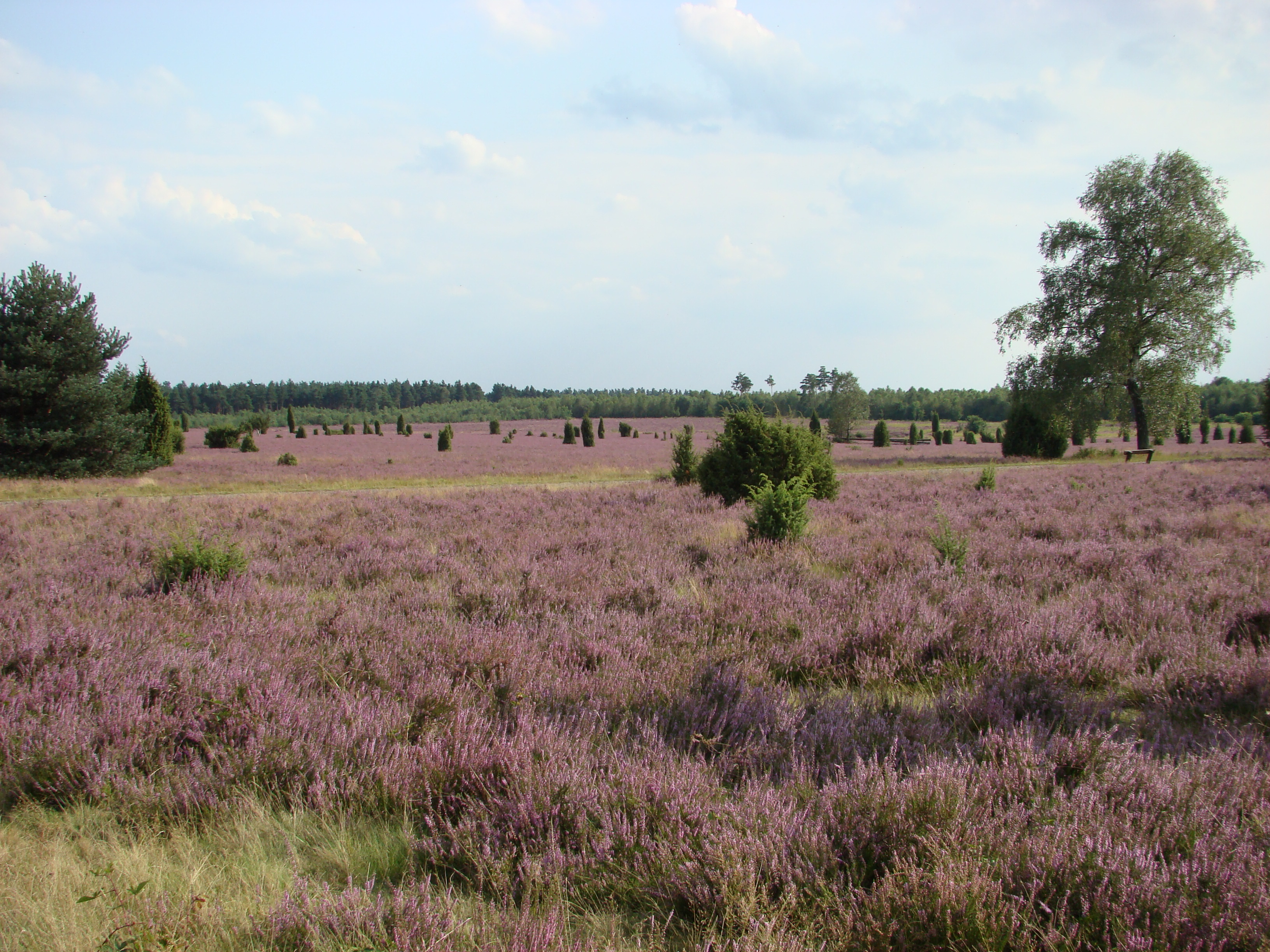
The heath in bloom in the nature park

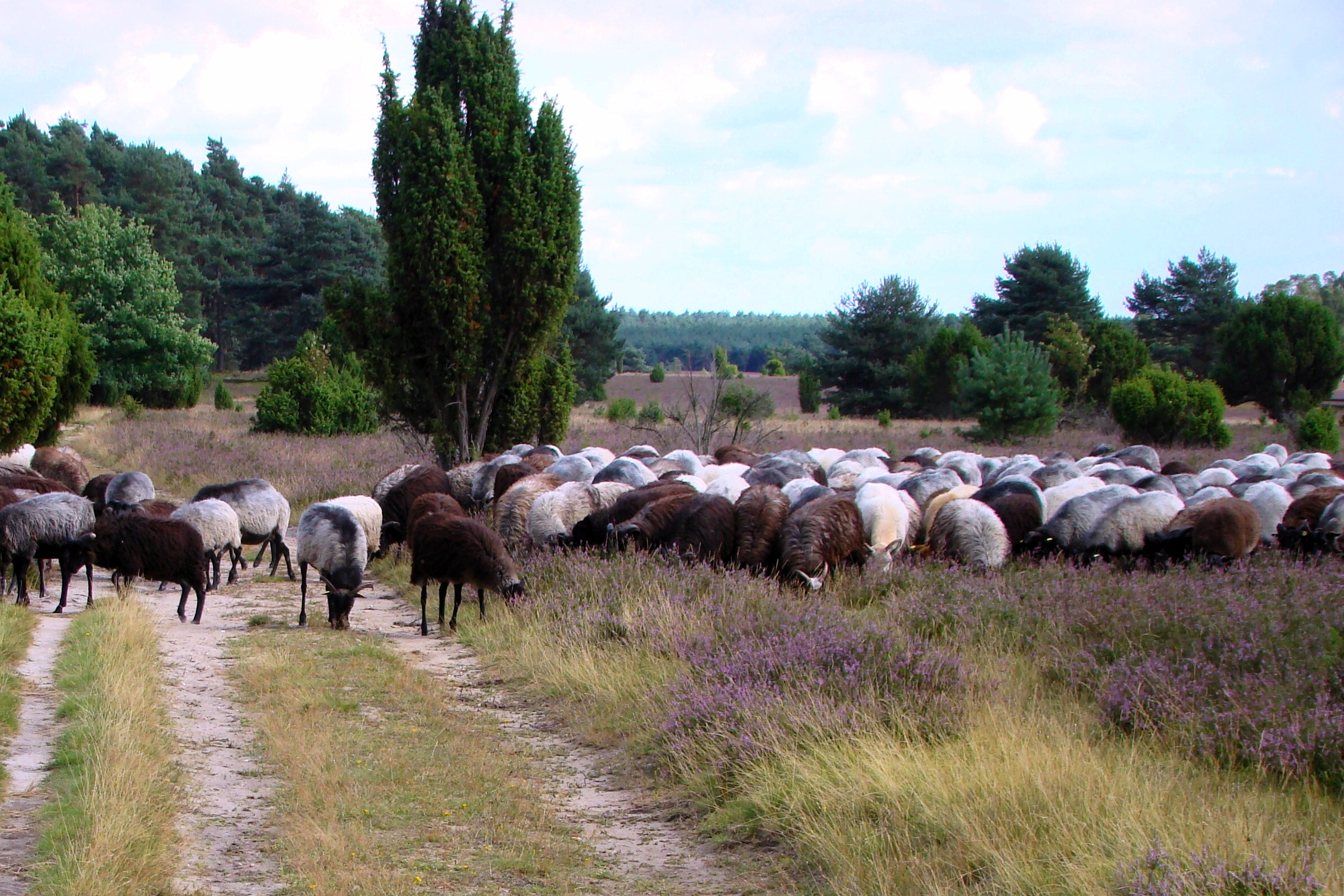
Moorland sheep on the Misselhorn Heath

The Südheide Nature Park ("Southern Heath Nature Park", German: Naturpark Südheide) is a large protected area of forest and heathland in the southern part of the Lüneburg Heath in North Germany. It has been designated as a protected nature park since 1964.

== Location ==
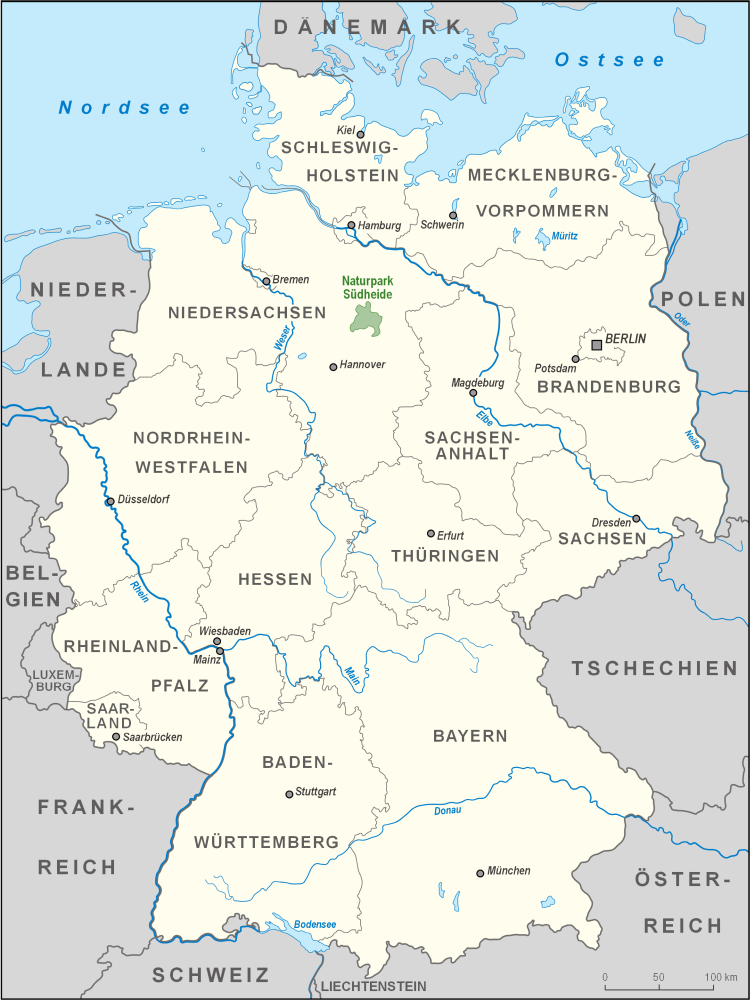
Location of the Südheide Nature Park

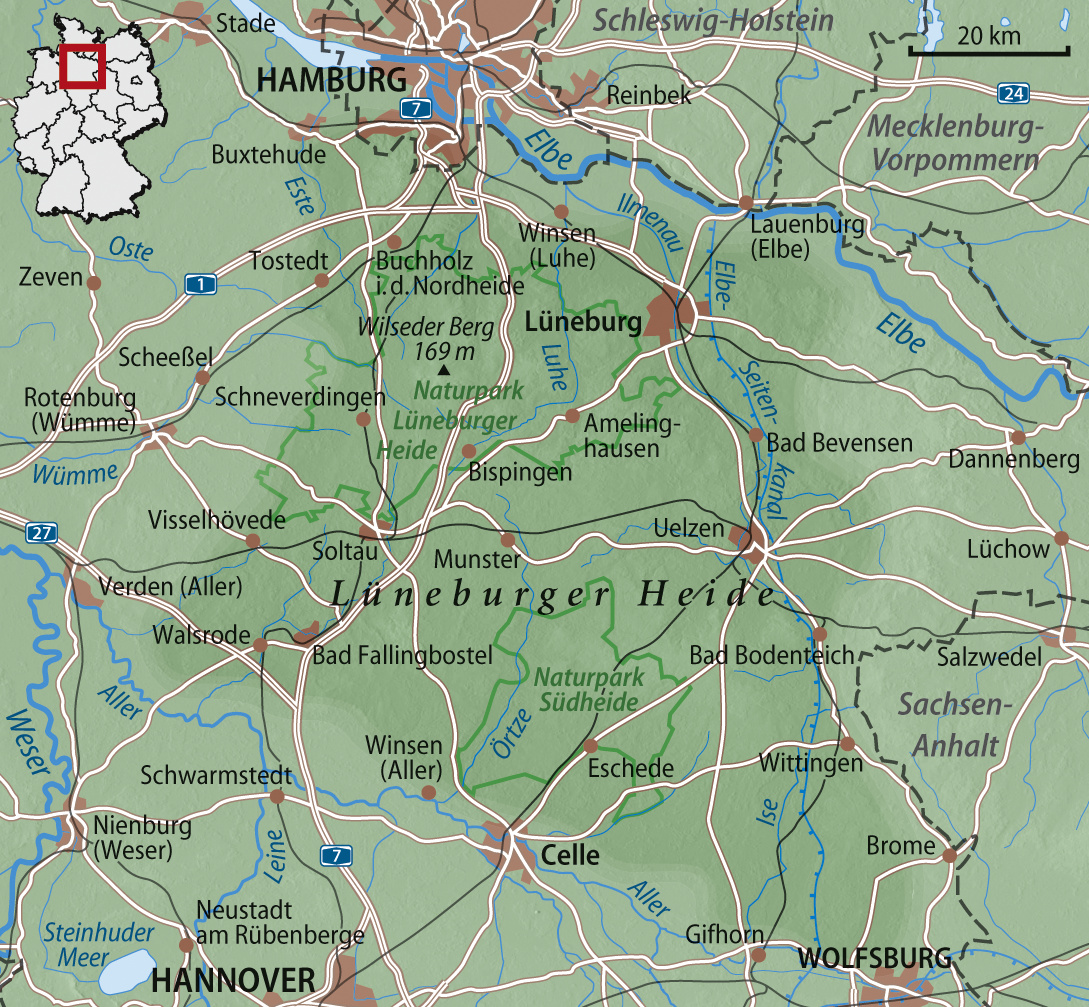
Location of the nature park within the Lüneburg Heath

The Südheide Nature Park is roughly 480 square kilometres (190 sq mi) in area and lies in the southern part of the Lüneburg Heath, in the northeastern part of Celle district, beginning a few kilometres north of Celle itself. From there it stretches northwards, between the towns of Bergen to the west, Faßberg to the north and Weyhausen and Steinhorst to the east. The other towns in the nature park are Eschede, Hermannsburg, Müden (Örtze), Unterlüß, Eldingen and, on the edge of the park, Winsen an der Aller.

The borders of the nature park are not identical with the term Südheide used in local parlance. That refers to the region south of a line from Munster to Uelzen to Gifhorn. Northwest of the Südheide Nature Park is the Lüneburg Heath Nature Park and, north of that, the Nordheide ("North Heath") with its nature park on the Harburg Hills. The whole region is referred to as the Lüneburg Heath (Lüneburger Heide).

== Formation and history ==
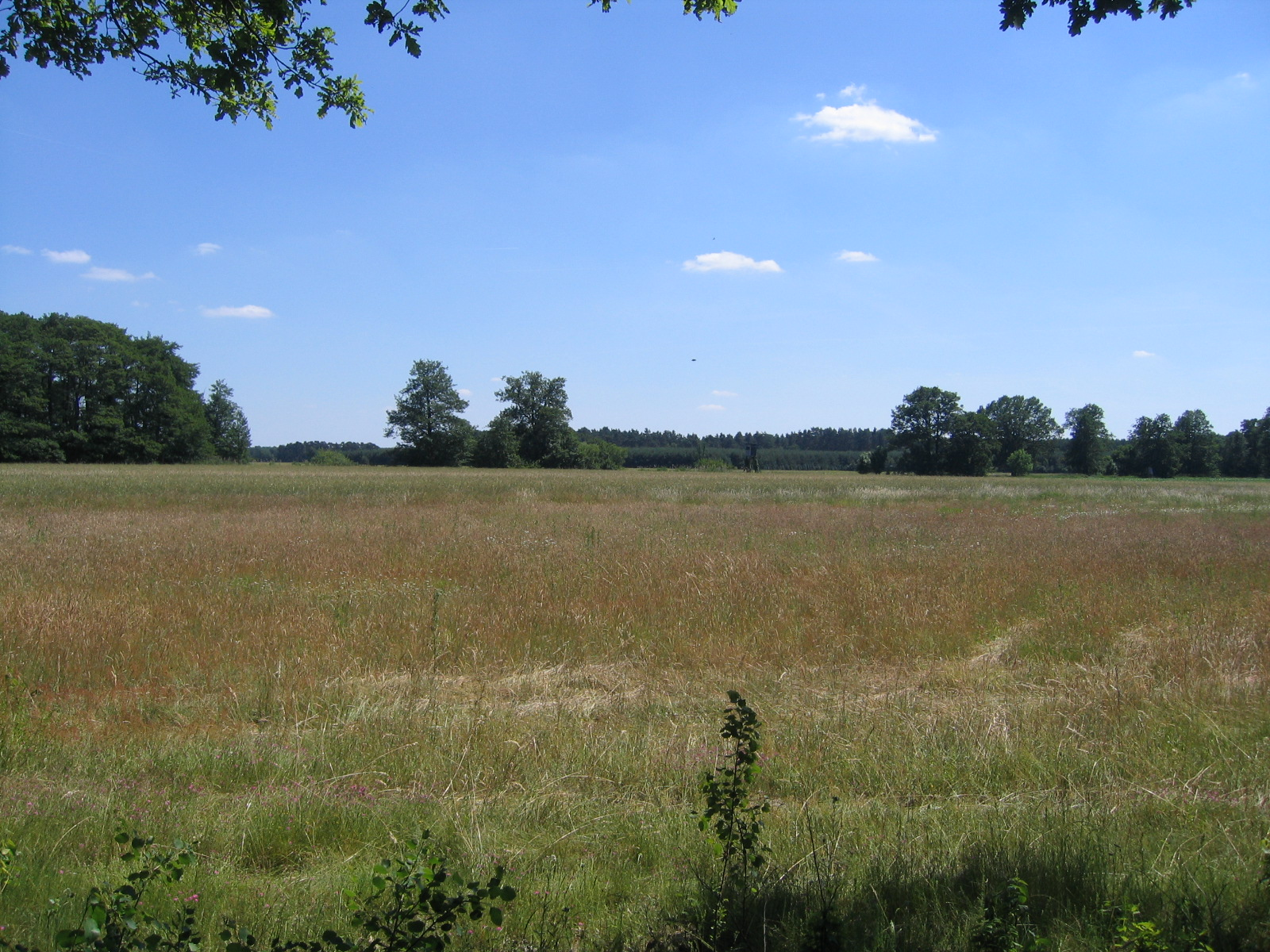
Farmland and woods on the Südheide near Wolthausen

The landscape of the nature park was shaped by the ice age, and the gravels and sands laid down during that time form an undulating to gently rolling terrain, made from areas of sandur, sheets of ground moraine and the remains of end moraines.

Around the 18th and 19th centuries, coniferous forests were planted on the nutrient-poor sands of the geest in the region of the present-day nature park. Formerly, only soils containing more clay could be used for arable farming, something which explains the sparse settlement of the area with its scattered hamlets and few transport routes. With the introduction of inorganic fertilizer in the 19th century even barren, sandy soils could be used to farm crops. As a result, the hitherto extensive heathlands were largely transformed into farmland.

Between 1863 and 1994 the highly versatile mineral, kieselgur, was extracted and worked at 5 places in the area of the nature park.

== Description ==
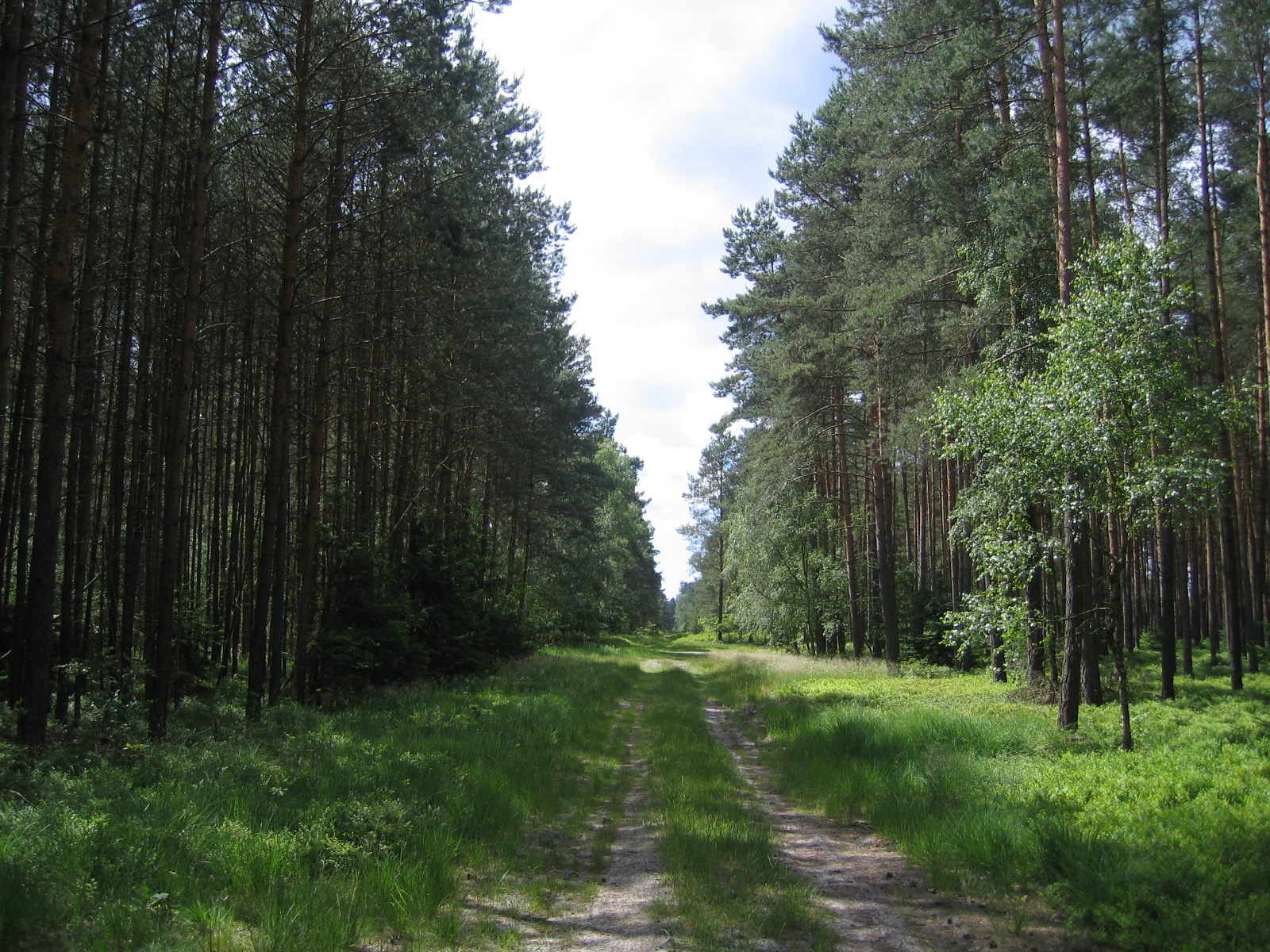
Typical woodland track through the Südheide, near Wolthausen

The Südheide Nature Park is part of one of the largest contiguous wooded areas in Germany, and is dominated mainly by pine and spruce. Parts of former royal forests such as the Lüßwald (Lüß Forest) in the northeast of the nature park, still have old beech and oak stands.

Of special importance within the park are the 525 hectares (1,300 acres) of heathland which are almost entirely covered in heather (Calluna vulgaris). Cross-leaved heath is only found occasionally, in damper places. These areas are the remnants of the vast heathlands of the Middle Ages that stretched from Celle to Lüneburg. They have now been protected, either as nature reserves, or as part of the European ecological network, Natura 2000.

The district of Celle in the east central part of Lower Saxony is responsible for the nature park which was founded in 1964. Almost all of the park's terrain is designated as a protected area and it also contains several more strictly protected nature reserves, some of European importance. The largest is the Lutter nature reserve ((Lachte-Lutter area) with a total area of 2,435.3 hectares (6,018 acres). Other large nature reserves within the park are the Weesener Bach with 348 hectares (860 acres), the Central Lüß Plateau Heathland (Tiefental) with 293 hectares (720 acres) and the Bornrieth Moor with 115 hectares (280 acres). Today 65% of the Südheide Nature Park is made up of woodlands. The park management looks after the preservation of the heathland, including grazing it with herds of moorland sheep, the Heidschnucke. Where that is not sufficient, machines are also used in the plaggen cultivation of the heath.

== Beekeeping ==
Like other parts of the Lüneburg Heath the Südheide Nature Park is a traditional region for heath beekeeping to produce heather honey. During the period when heather is in bloom, beekeepers bring their beehives from regions a long way off to the heath areas. Some of the hives are set up in fixed so-called bee enclosures (Bienenständen). Very rarely the Lüneburg Skep (Lüneburger Stülper) may be found, a basket in the shape of a bell, or the rectangular Kanitz basket (Kanitzkorb), both made of straw which is sealed with a mixture of cow dung and peat. These enclosures are still used today by beekeepers to harvest comb honey. In the mid-1920s the so-called Kanitz baskets appeared, named after the beekeeper and teacher, Kanitz (1815–1899). He discovered that the bell-shaped baskets commonly used at the time were less effective for colony management.

The old basket types of beehive have been largely superseded these days by boxes made of wood or plastic which are easier to carry. The plastic Langstroth hive which are now common in North Germany are simply set up on the heathland when the heather blooms.

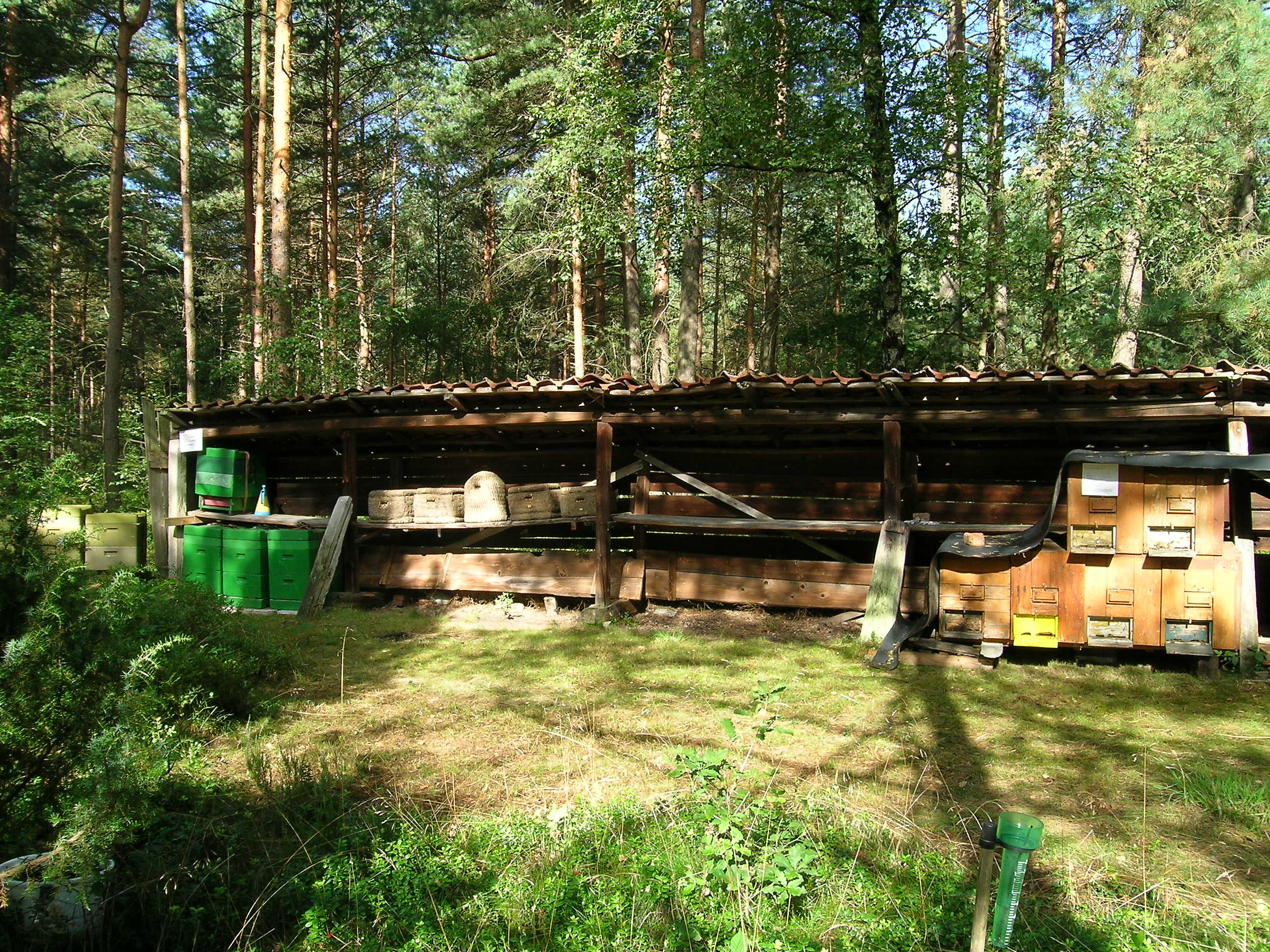
Beehive on the edge of a wood with (from left to right): modern plastic boxes, Kanitz baskets, a Lüneburg Skep and wooden box

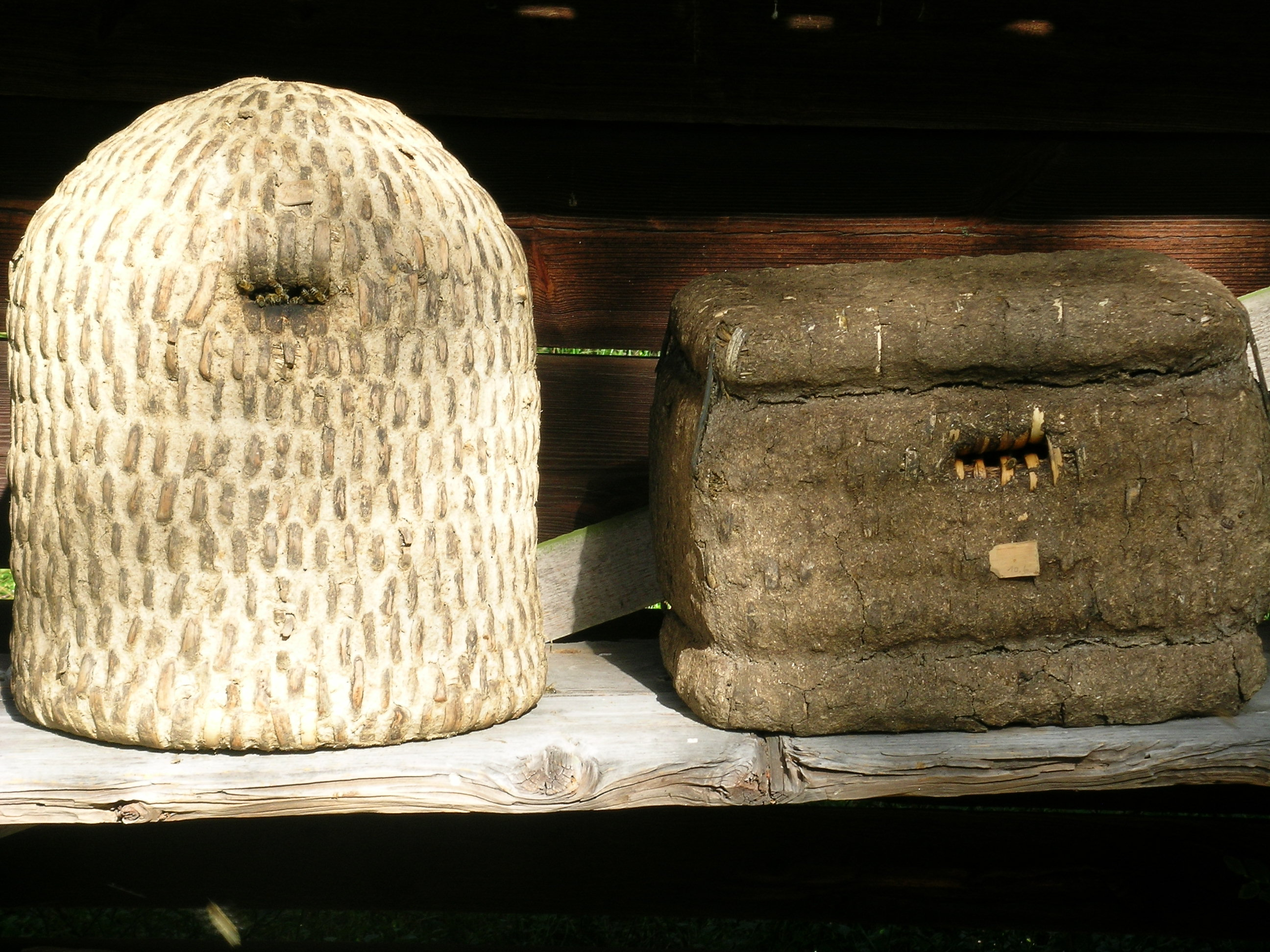
A Lüneburg Skep (left) and a Kanitz basket made of straw

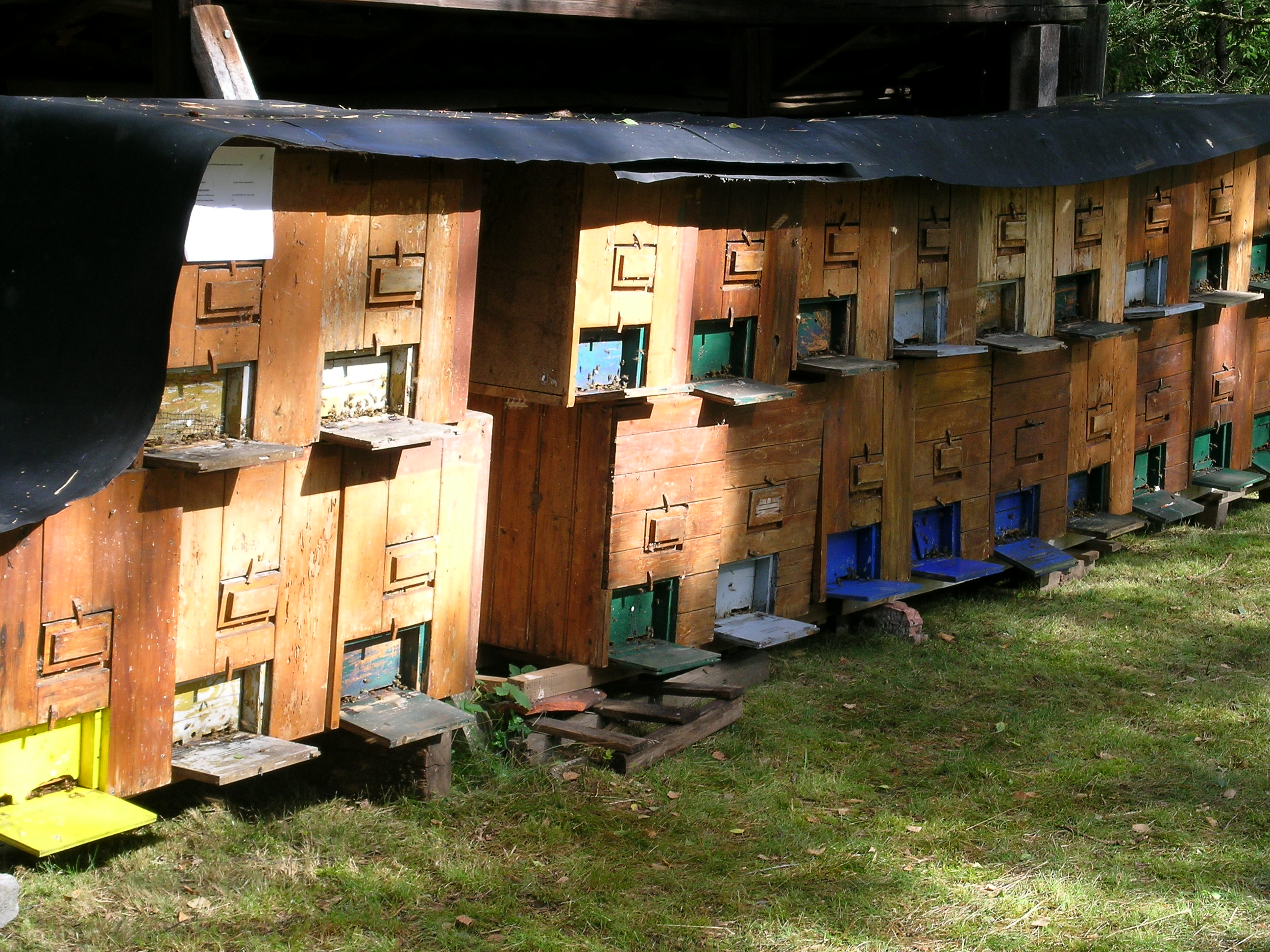
Bee boxes made of wood

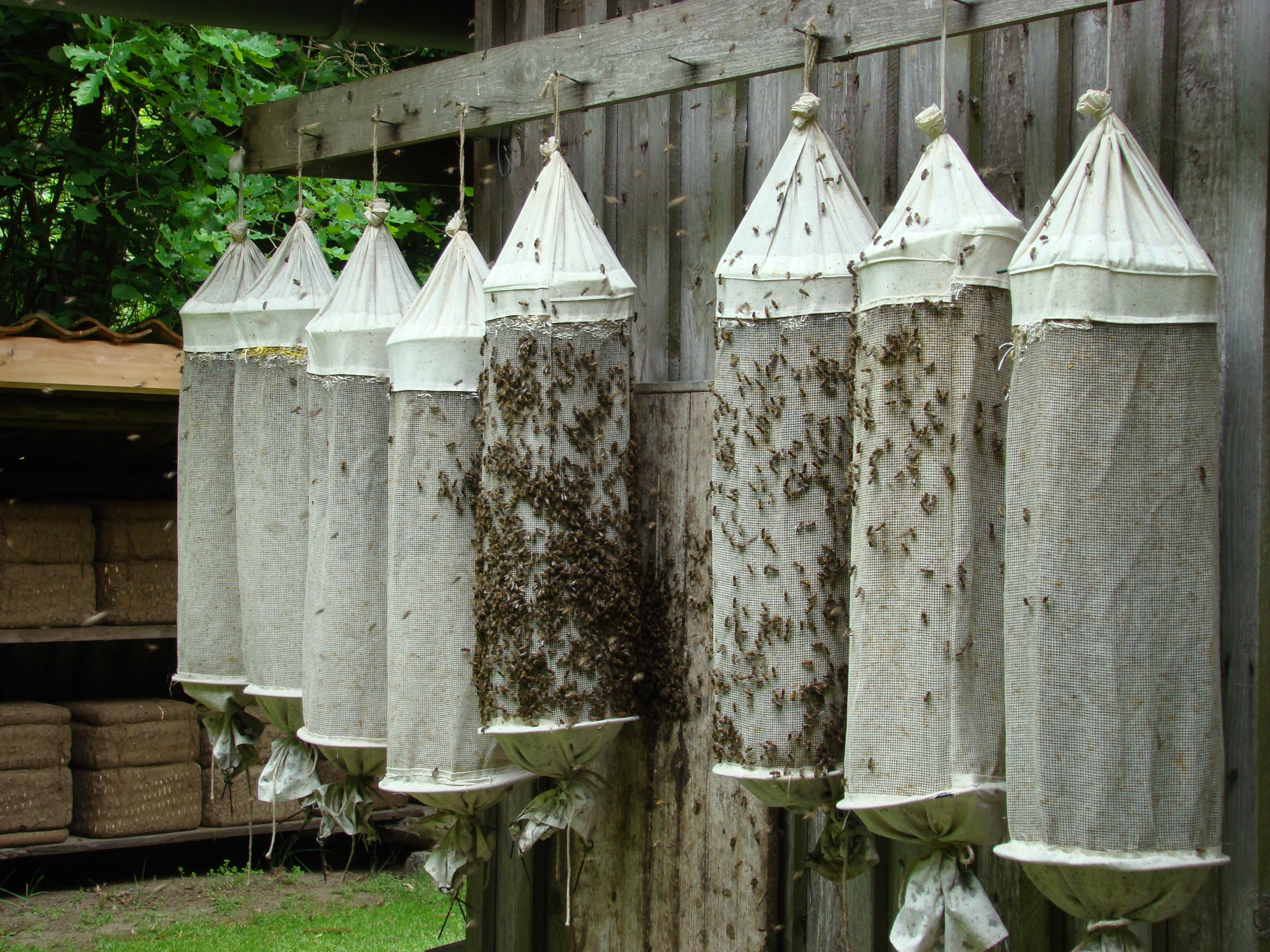
Swarm sacks with captured swarms of bees hanging in a bee enclosure

== Geography, fauna and flora ==
=== Geography and flora ===
The near-natural heath streams of the Örtze, Weesener Bach, Aschau, Lutter and Lachte run through the park and provide a home for otters, trout and freshwater pearl mussels. Many endangered species of plant and animal have also found a habitat in these streams, sections of which lie within nature reserves. The sources of these heath streams often lie in idyllic bogs on the heath. The Örtze is popular with boaters due to its many meanders.

The Lutter and its tributary streams, the Schmalwasser and Ahrbeck, and the Lachte, which flow through the eastern part of the Südheide Nature Park, form an extensive river system covering an area of about 2,450 hectares (9.5 sq mi) which has been designated as a nature reserve. The region is of particular importance for nature conservation on the Südheide as it is in an almost natural state. As well as the brooks with their fish and otters, there are also adjacent water meadows and carrs, bogs, marshes and river source areas, in which birds such as the black stork, sea eagle and crane are found as well as rare river dragonflies, like the small red damselfly which is threatened with extinction and the severely endangered keeled skimmer. Over 160 endangered animal and plant species live by and in these heath streams. Especially significant are the last remaining colonies of the Northwest European freshwater pearl mussel, which makes very high demands on the quality of its habitat. The Bundesamt für Naturschutz, the state of Lower Saxony and the districts of Celle and Gifhorn have supported this nature conservation project since 1989.

One of the highest elevations, and a popular viewing point in the nature park, is the Haußelberg at 119.1 metres above NN. There are still a few intact raised bogs, notably the Bornrieth Moor near Oldendorf, but also the small bogs near Hetendorf and Müden/Örtze, that have colonies of protected plants like the sundew, the bog-asphodel, the bistort and the cottongrass, as well as rare orchids like the Western marsh orchid, das heath spotted orchid, the lesser butterfly orchid and the Broad-leaved Helleborine.

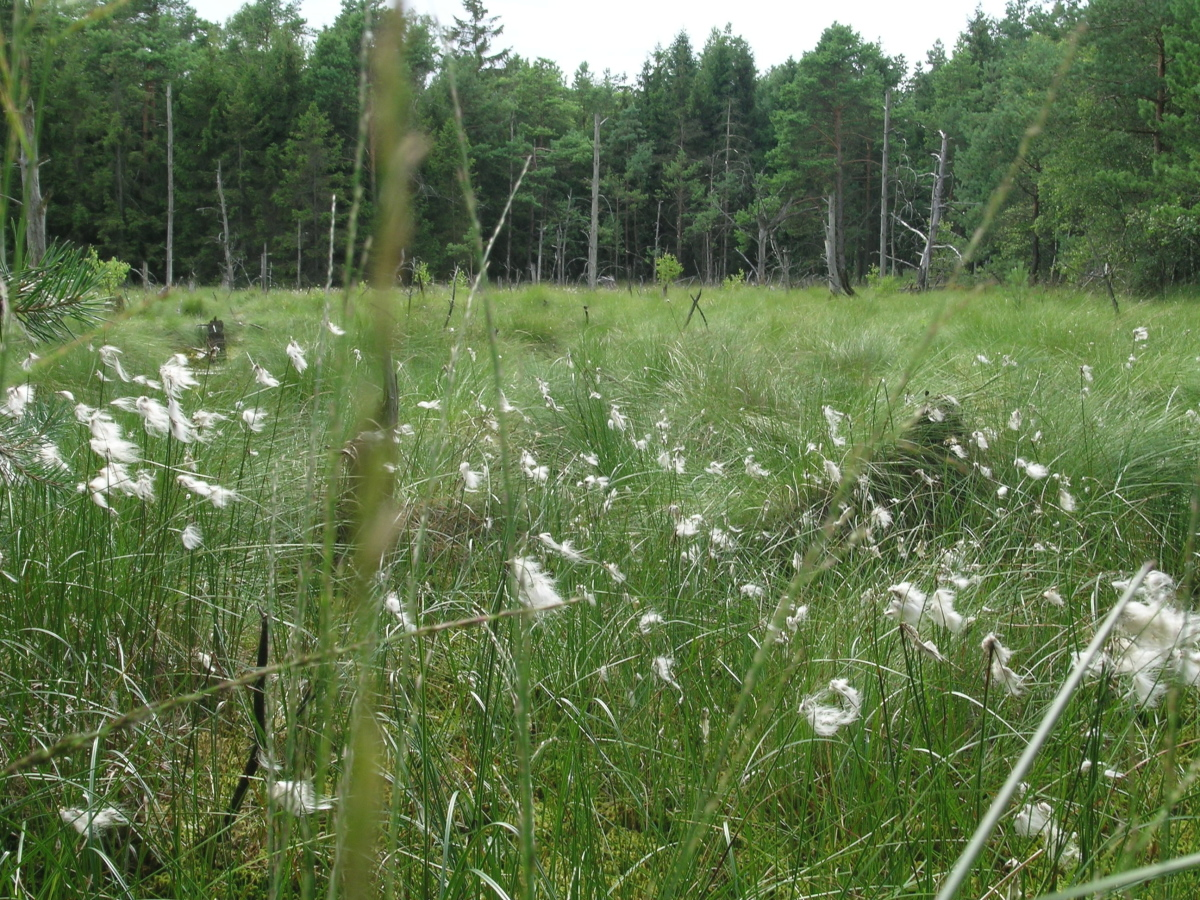
Cottongrass on the raised bog near Hetendorf

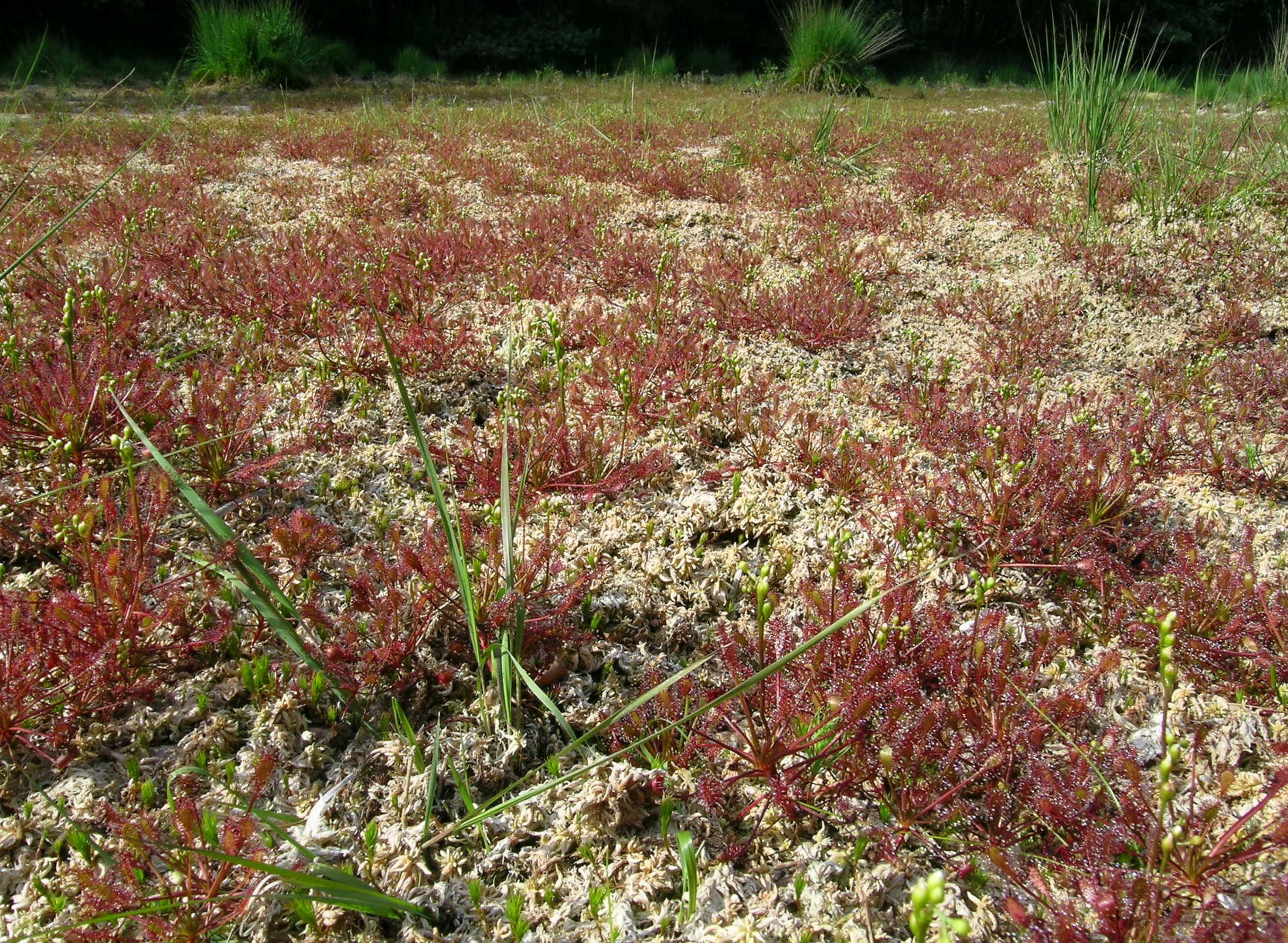
spoonleaf sundew on a moor near Hermannsburg

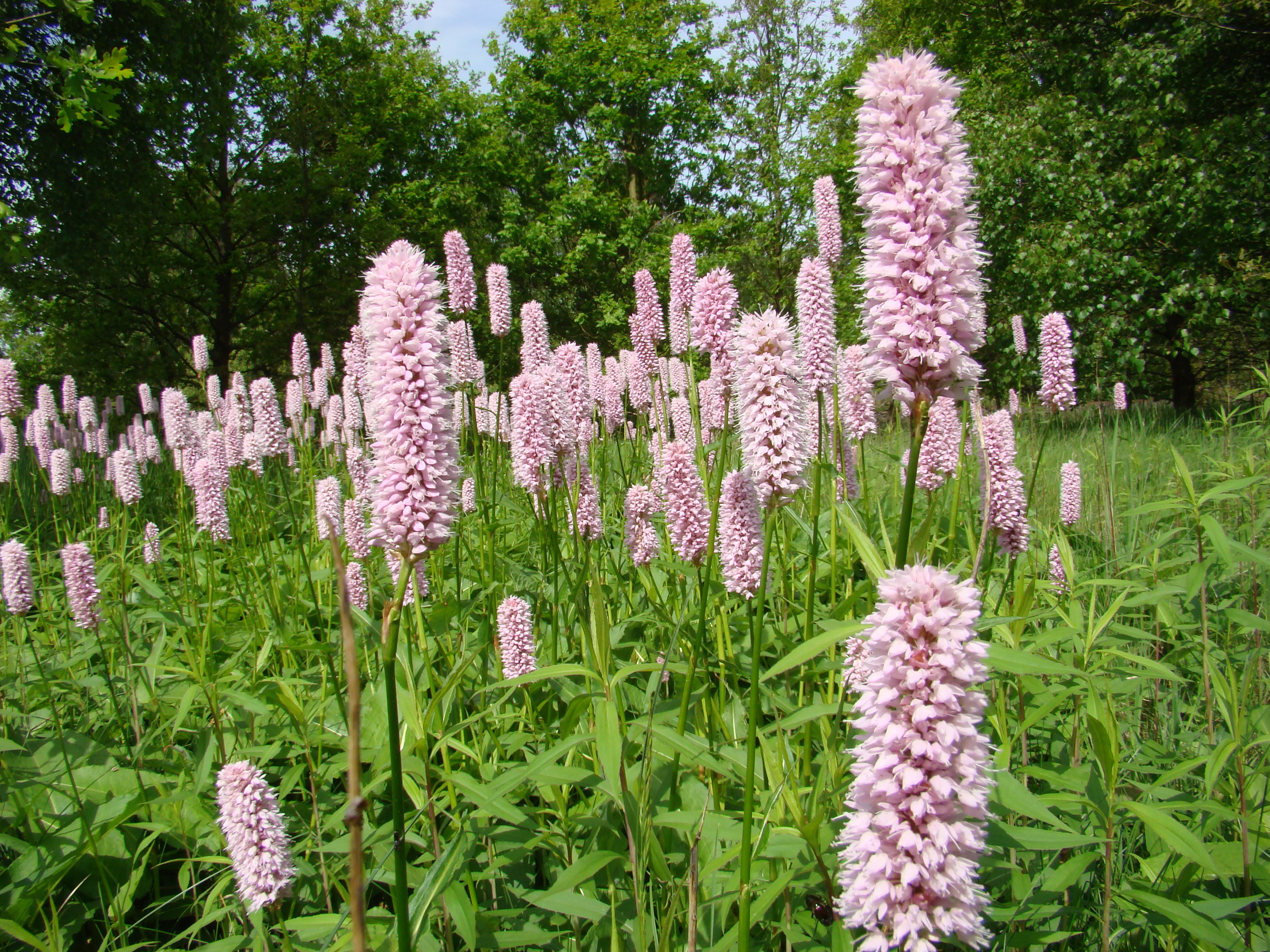
Bistort

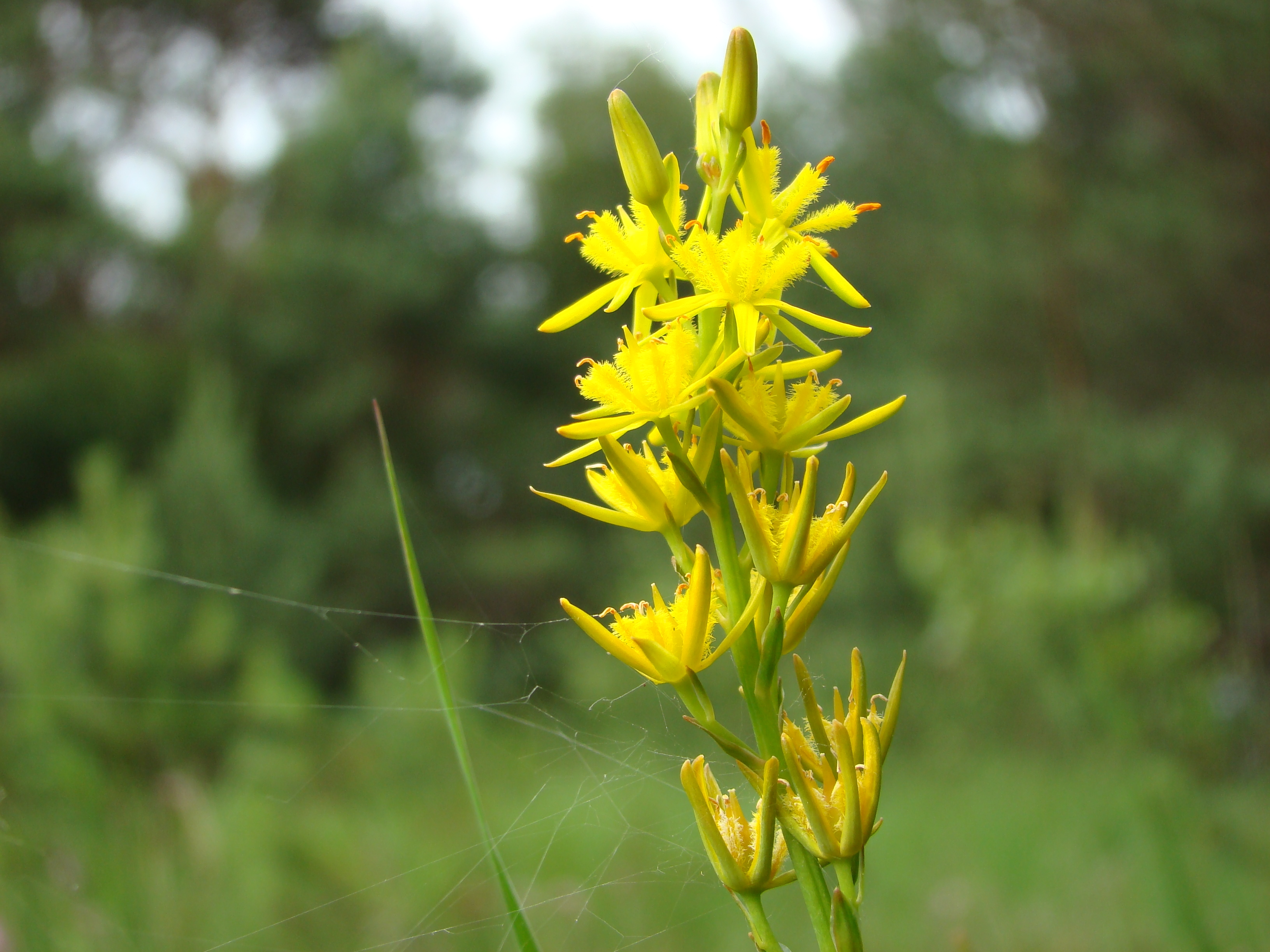
Bog-asphodel
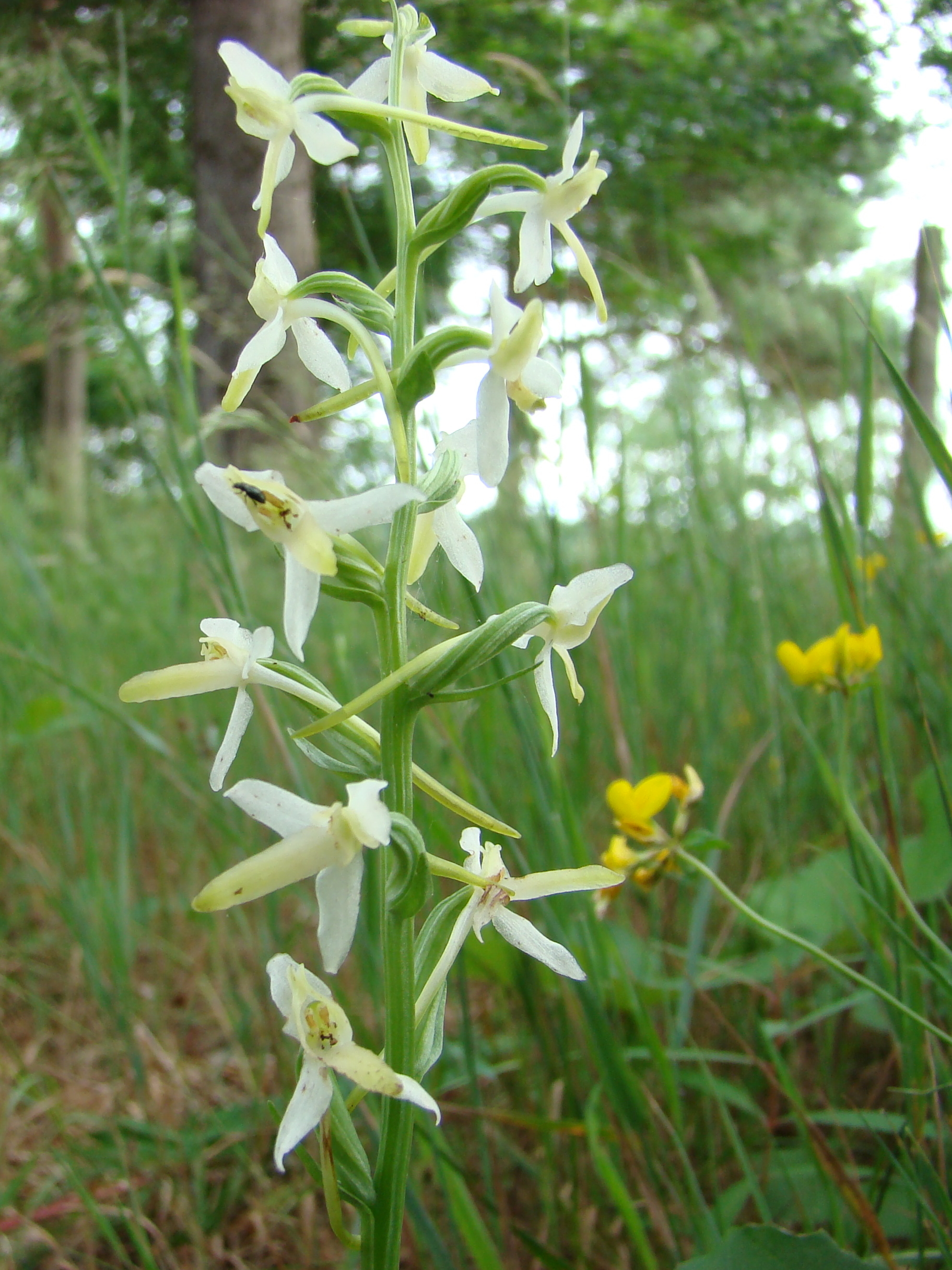
Lesser Butterfly-orchids in a wood near Müden (Örtze)

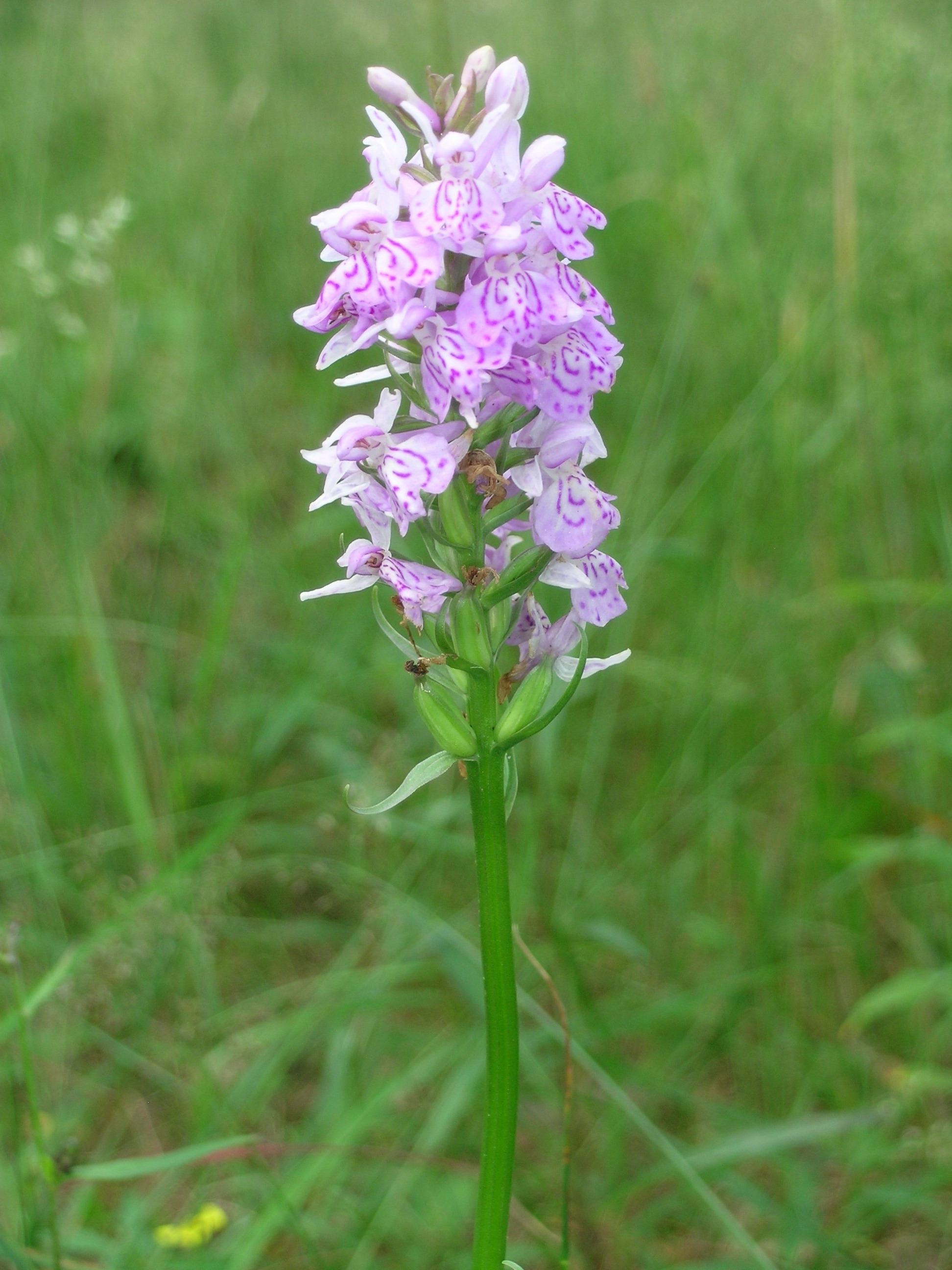
Heath spotted orchid in a wood near Müden (Örtze)

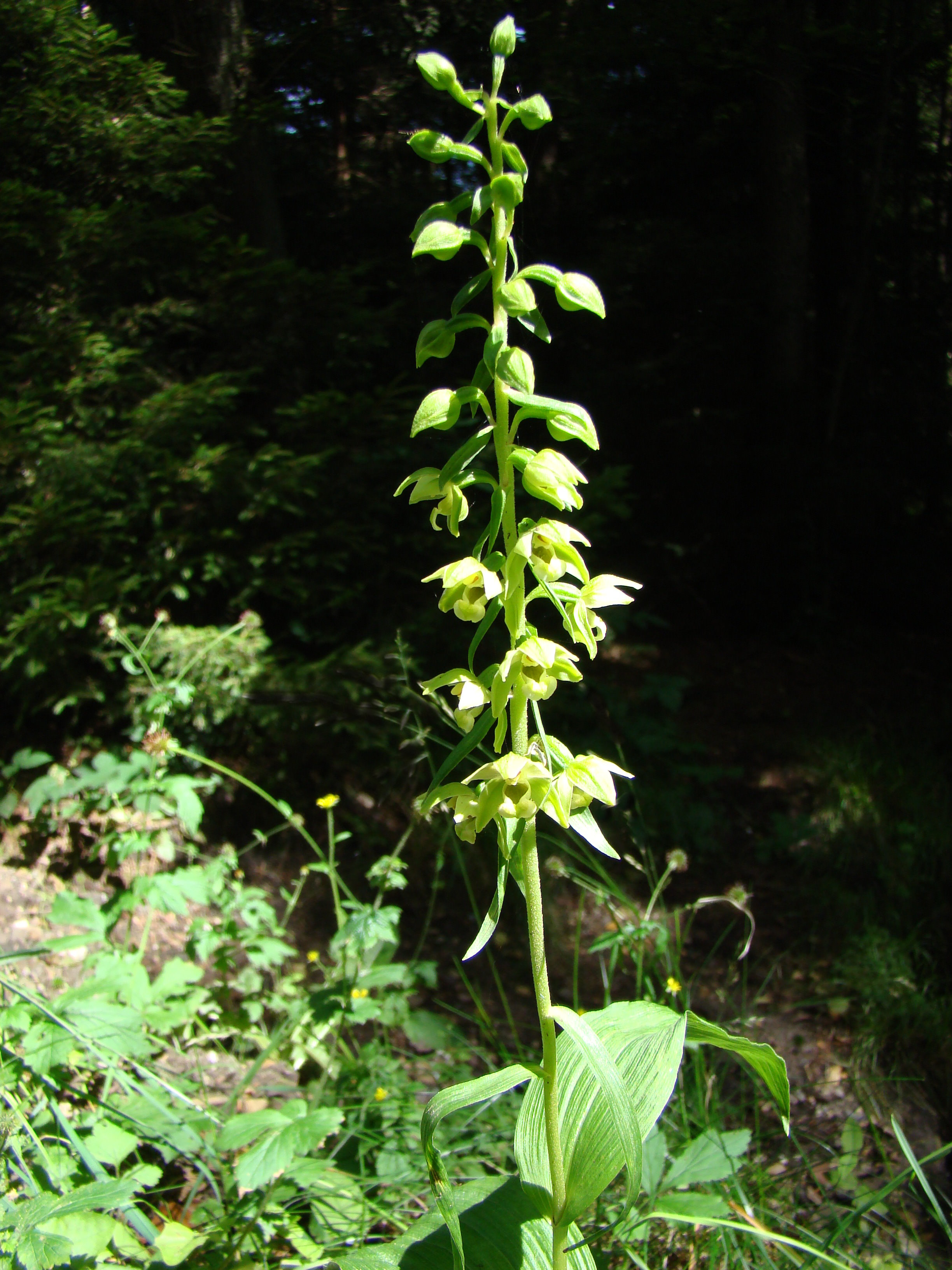
Broad-leaved helleborine near Müden (Örtze)

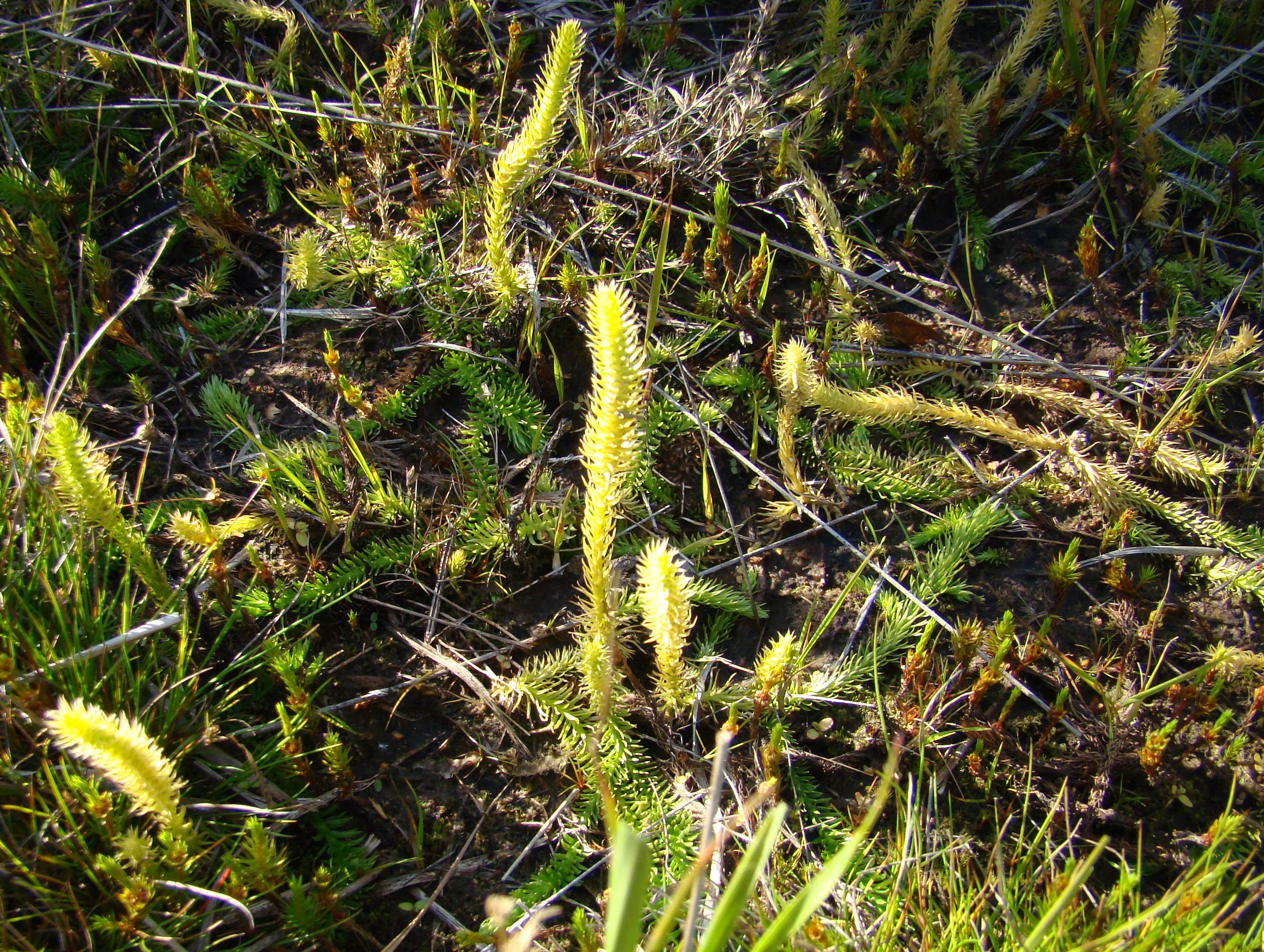
Northern bog club moss in Neu Ohe

=== Fauna ===
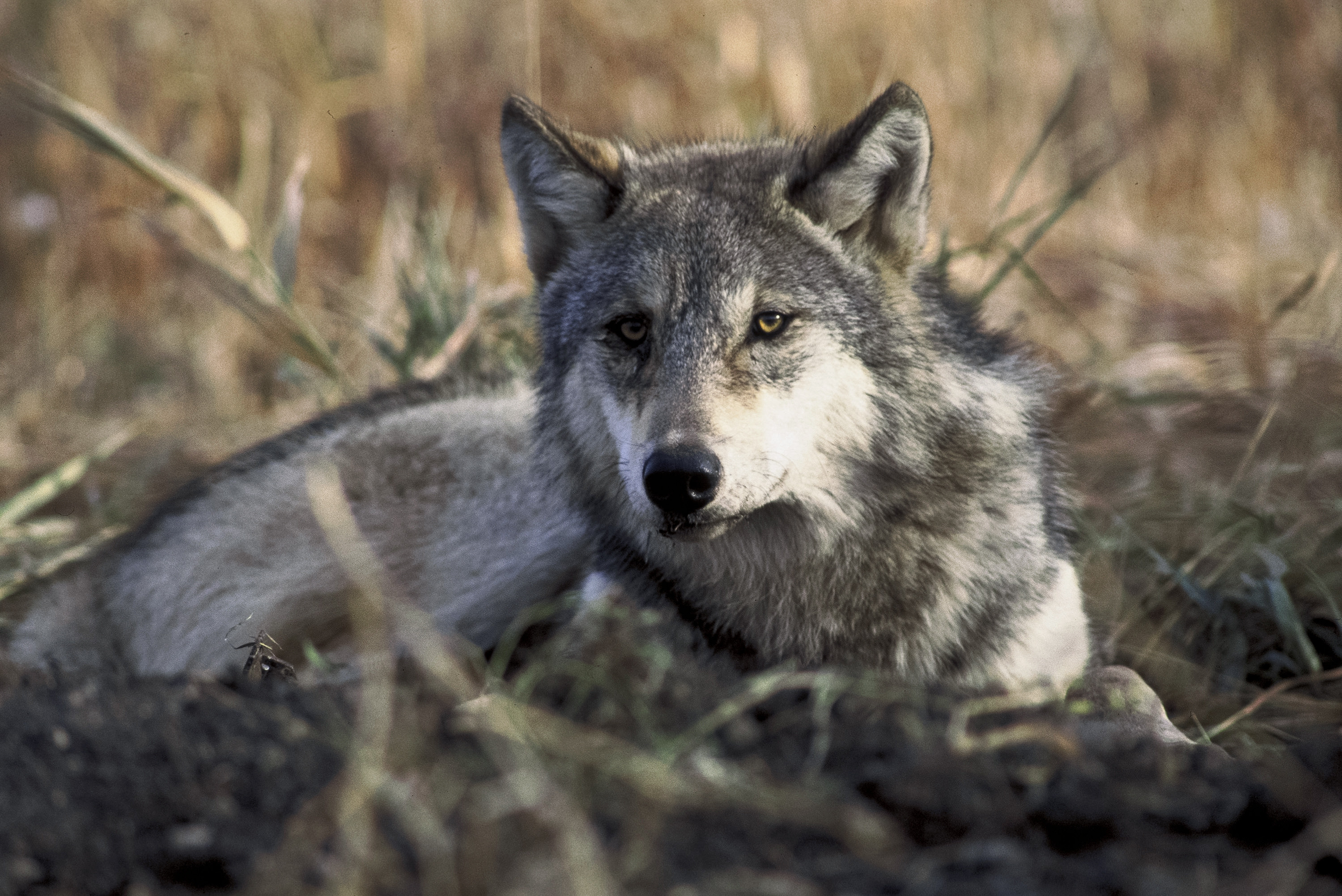
A wolf

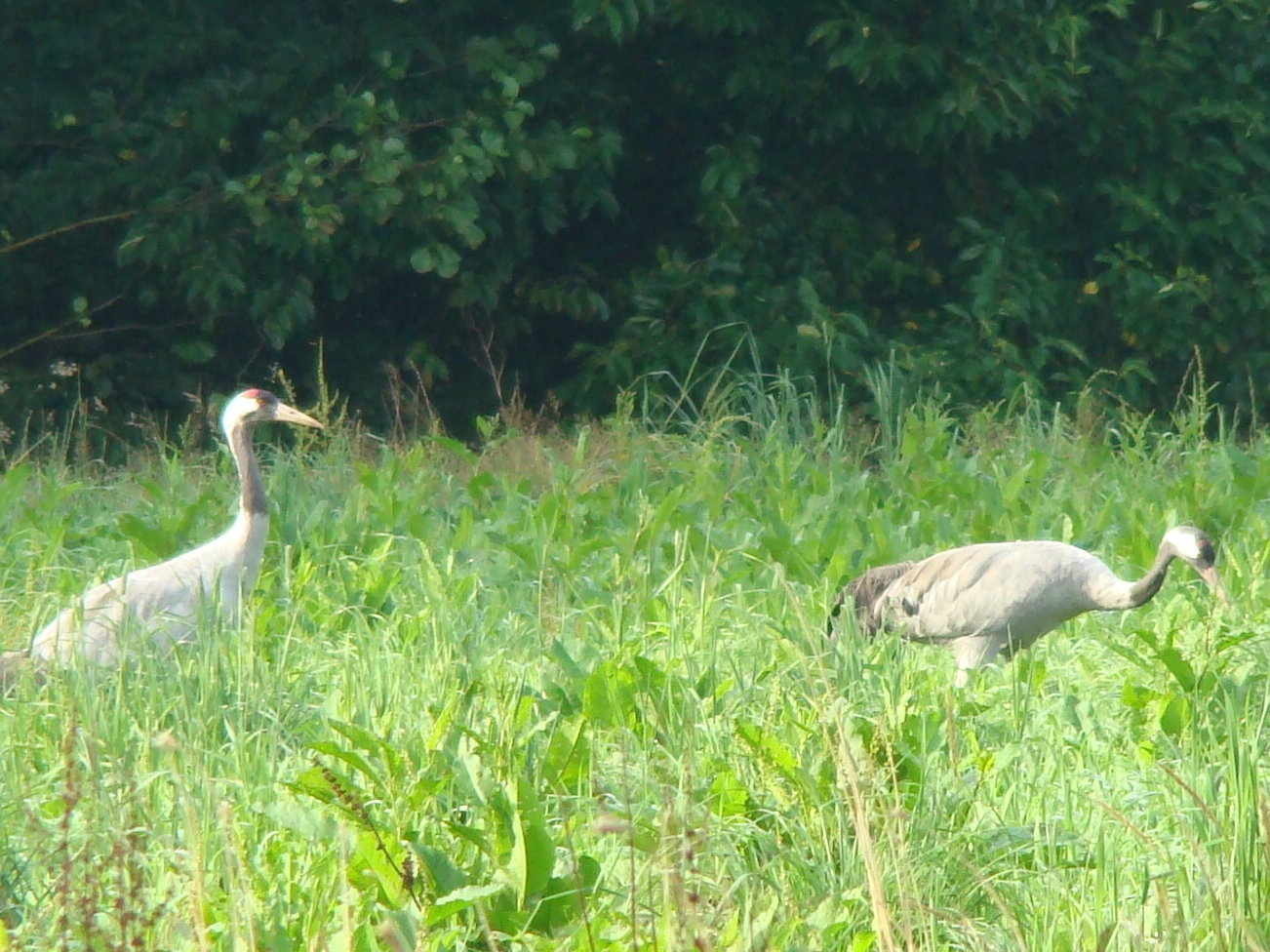
Common cranes foraging for food in the vicinity of Oldendorf

In 1872 the last wolf on the Lüneburg Heath was seen and shot in the Becklingen Wood. In the vicinity of Unterlüß, on the Rheinmetall company's firing range which is not open to the public, a wolf was clearly identified again for the first time in September 2006. In spring 2008 there were two sightings of wolves. In all probability these were not the same animal, so it can be deduced that two wolves have settled here.

The reflooding of the bogs, as part of the Lower Saxon crane conservation programme, has succeeded in re-establishing the common crane (Grus grus) in the area. After a gap of over 20 years two cranes appeared for the first time in the district of Celle. As a result, the crane was moved from level 1 (threatened with extinction) on the red list to level 3 (endangered).

==== Crane population in Celle district ====
Year	Resident pairs	Breeding pairs	Young	Year	Resident pairs	Breeding pairs	Young
1986	2	1	0	1997	16	13	19
1987	2	2	2	1998	22	19	18
1988	3	2	2	1999	29	20	17
1989	3	3	1	2000	34	23	23
1990	3	3	5	2001	38	24	28
1991	5	4	5	2002	41	26	22
1992	6	5	7	2003	42	29	31
1993	6	6	8	2004	51	36	33
1994	9	9	7	2005	54	46	30
1995	12	11	11	2006	55	47	51
1996	16	12	15	2007	53	44	49

== Places of interest ==
The largest still contiguous areas of heath are found near Hermannsburg (Central Lüß Plateau Heathland, Tiefental) and between Müden/Örtze and Unterlüß in the vicinity of Oberohe. Other heathlands are located near Müden/Örtze (Wietzer Berg, 102 m) near Schmarbeck (Wacholderwald), near Gerdehaus (Ritterheide), near the Haußelberg (118 m) and near Lutterloh. Three large Heidschnucke herds are still tended in the region. One herd is in Niederohe, one in Schmarbeck and one near Hermannsburg. They keep the heather short by grazing and also kill off the invasive pines and birches. The Wacholderpark (juniper park) near Schmarbeck is a belt of heathland with juniper bushes. On the Wietzer Berg south of Müden/Örtze there is a monument, the Löns Stone (Lönsstein) which commemorates local author, Hermann Löns. Between Hermannsburg and Müden/Örtze is a spot where seven paths head off in various directions. In September stags may be seen rutting near Starkshorn (near Eschede). Every year 2 groups (Rudel) of almost 200 hinds gather on the meadows.

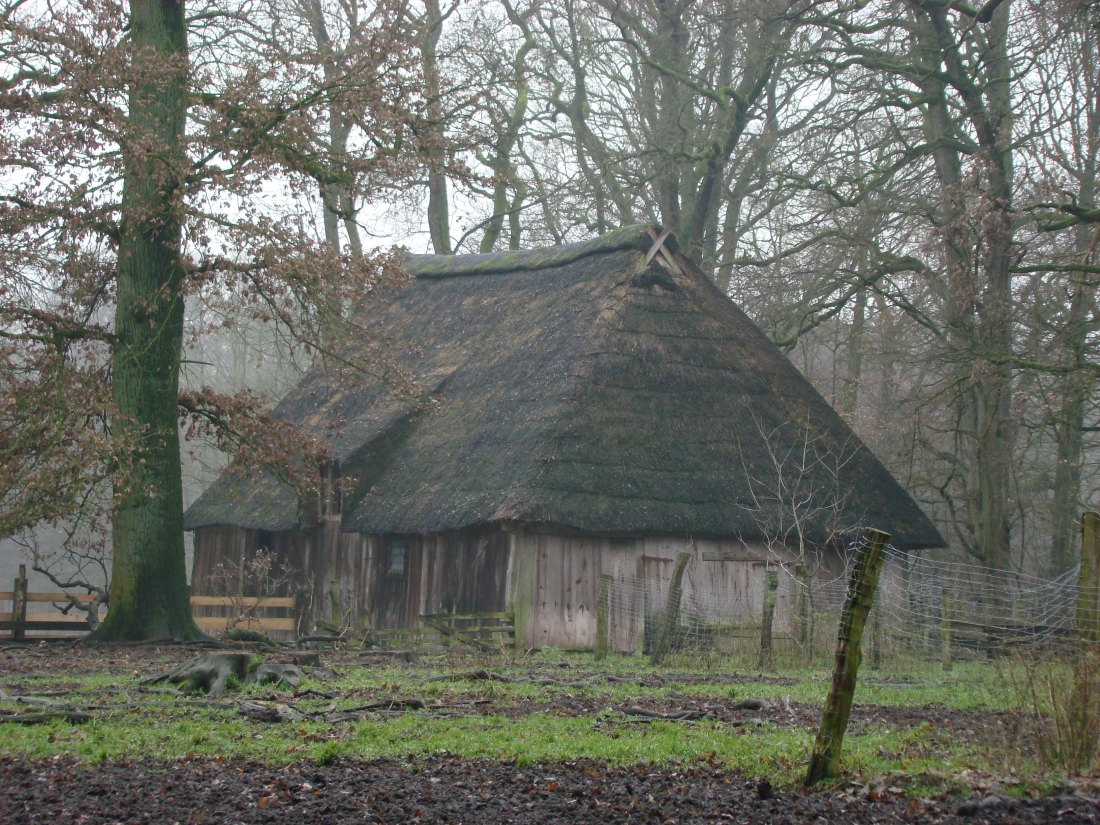
Heidschnuckenstall in Niederohe

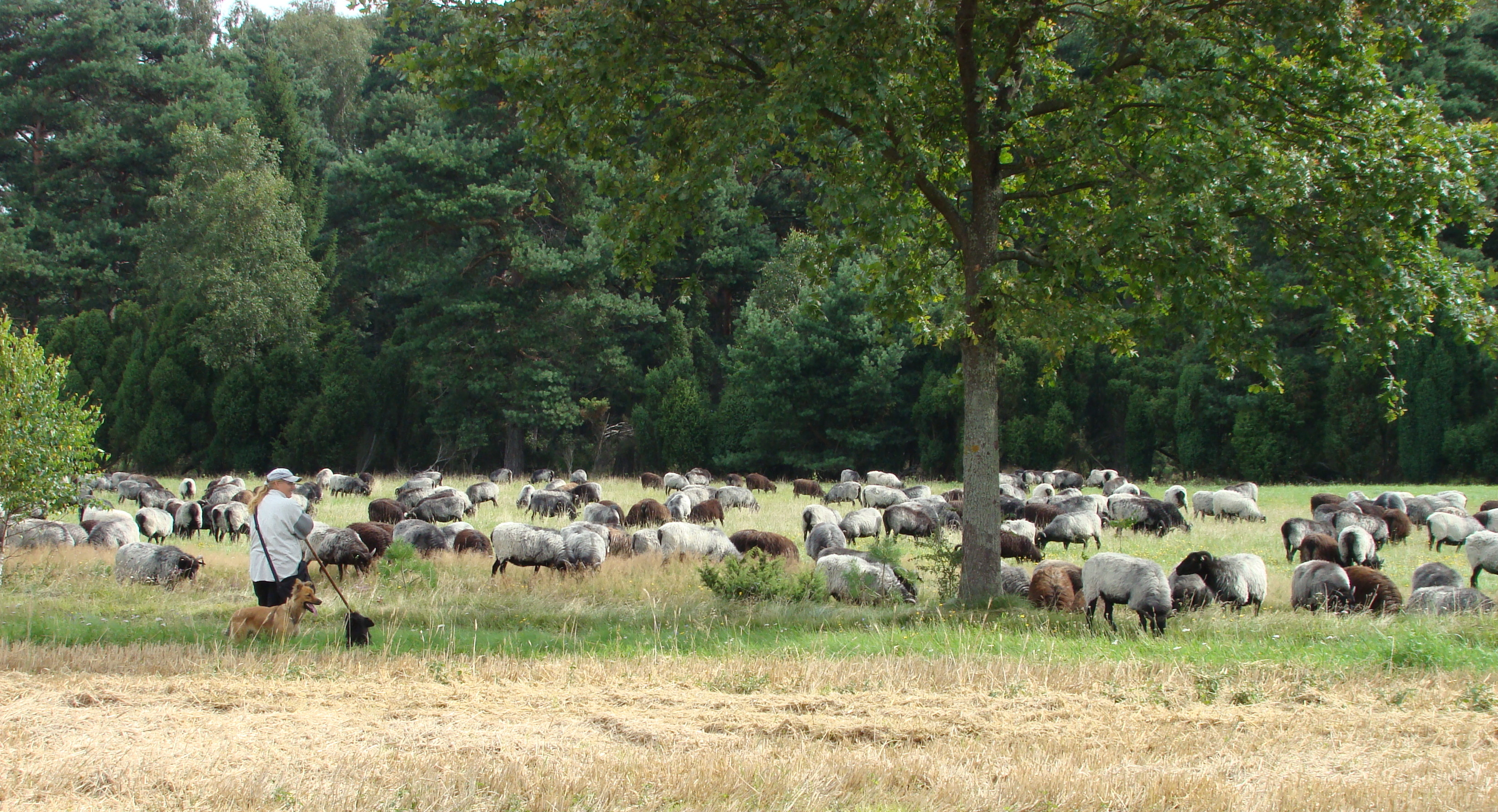
Heidschnucke herd near Schmarbeck

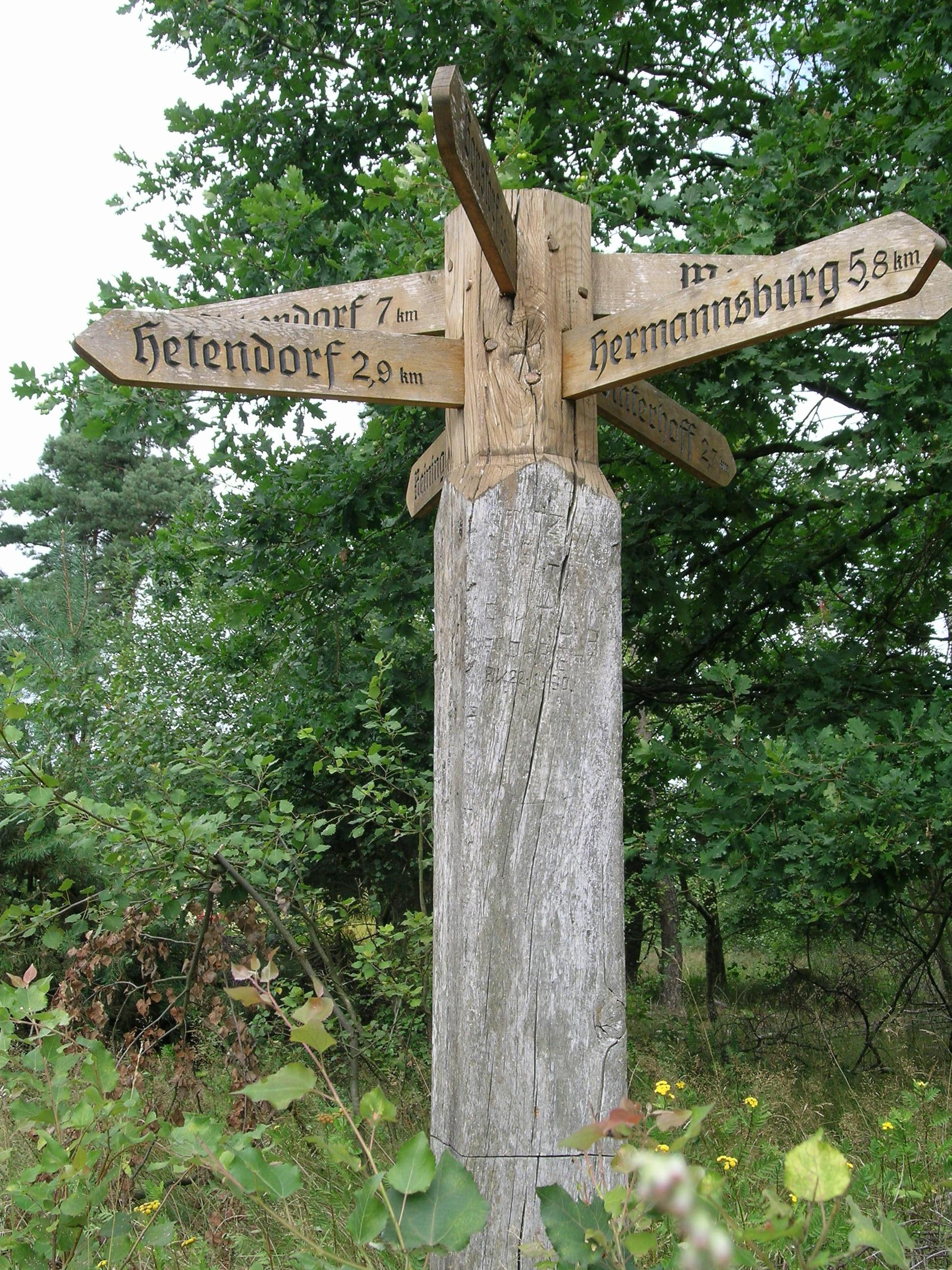
Signpost with seven arms near Hetendorf

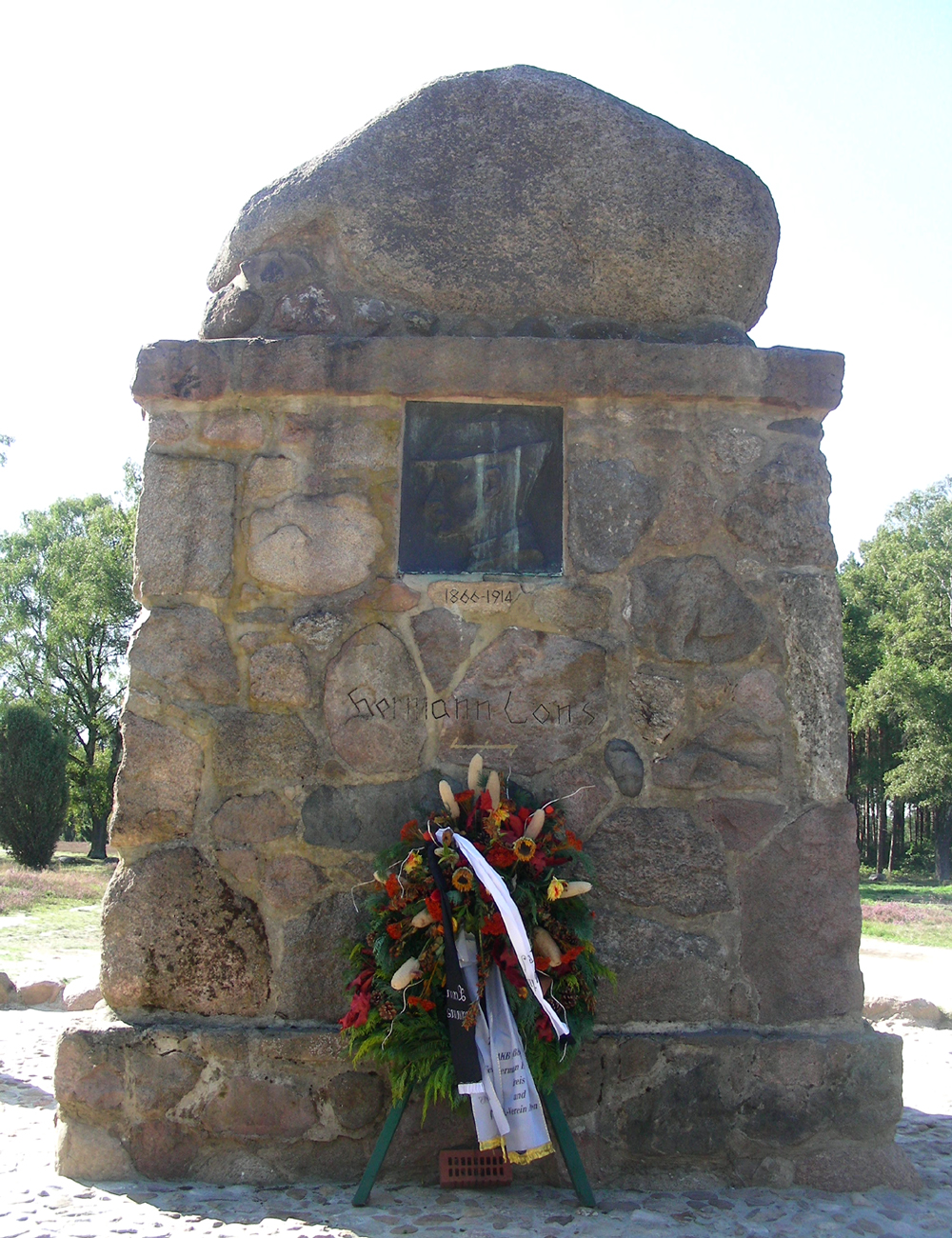
Löns Stone on the Wietzer Berg near Müden (Örtze)

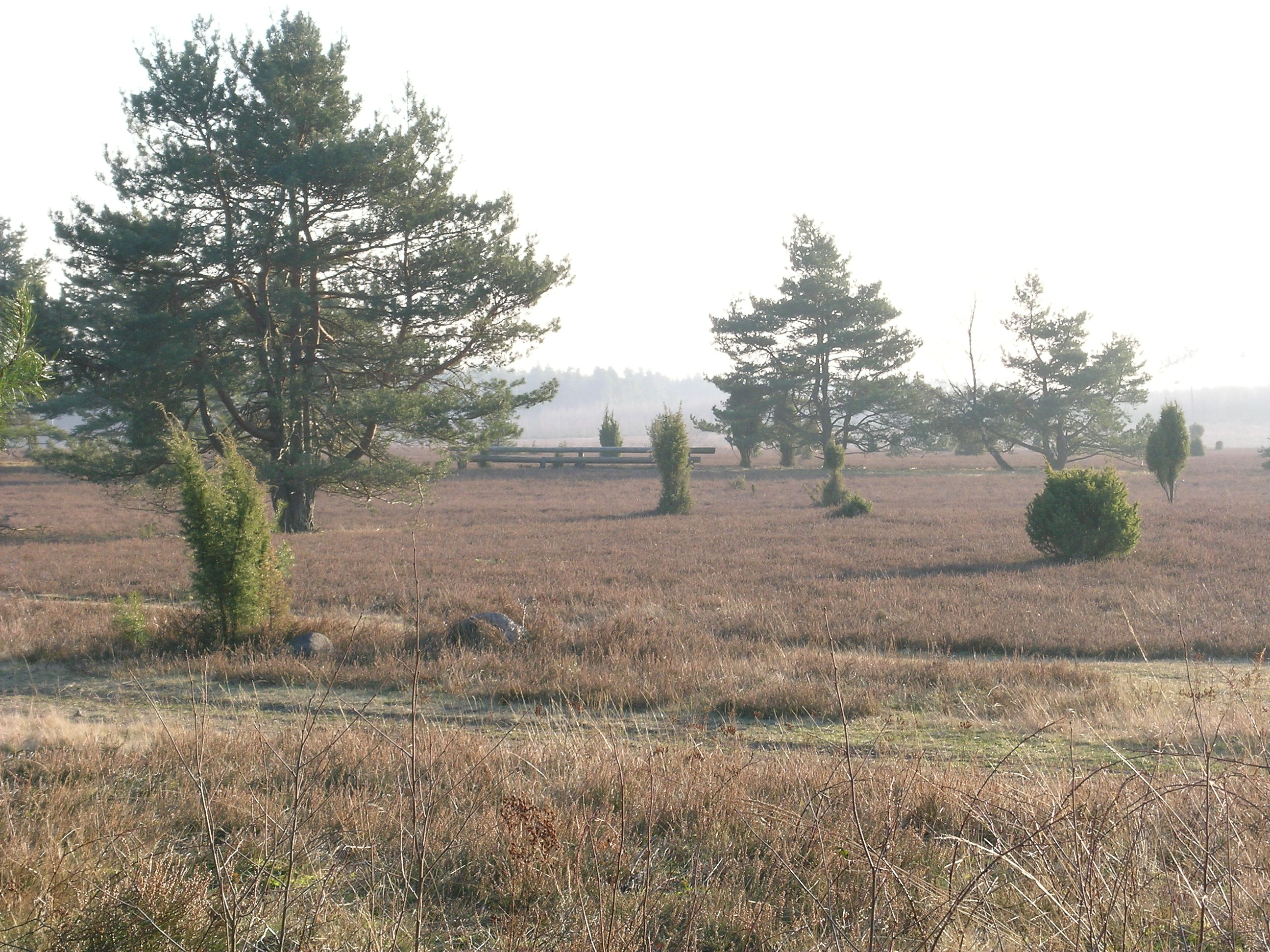
Heath in Tiefental

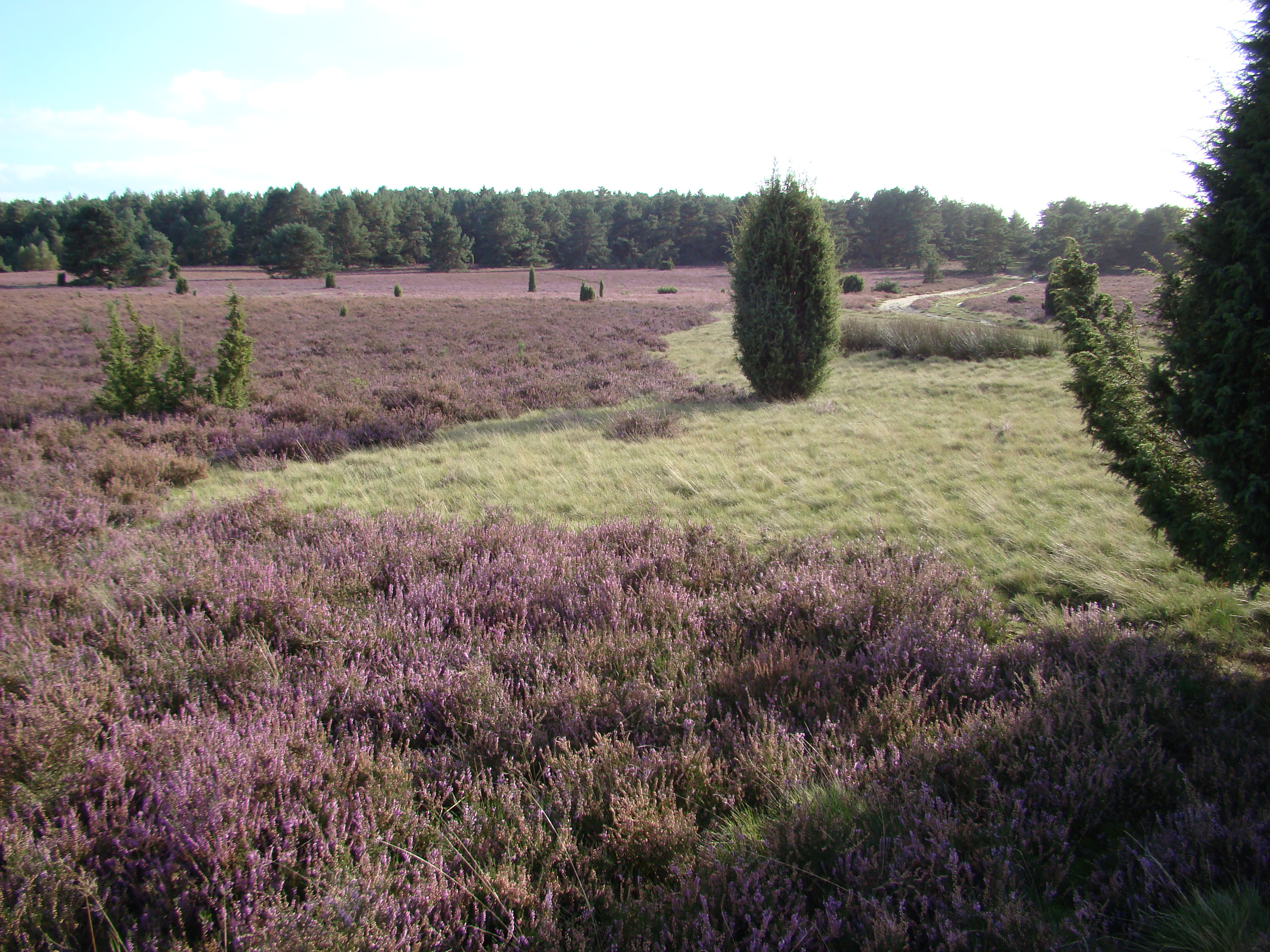
Heathland on the Haußelberg

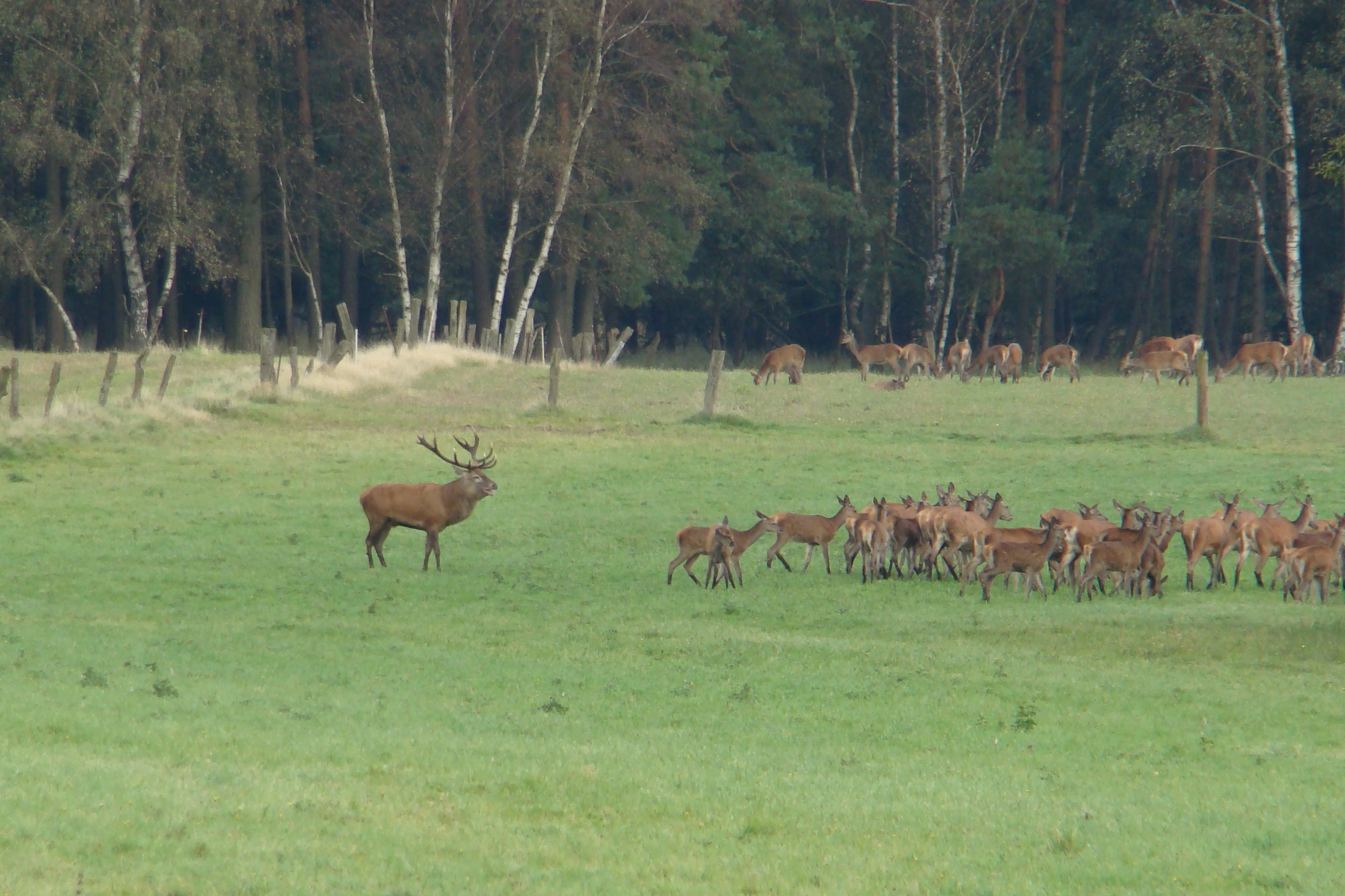
Deer rutting near Starkshorn

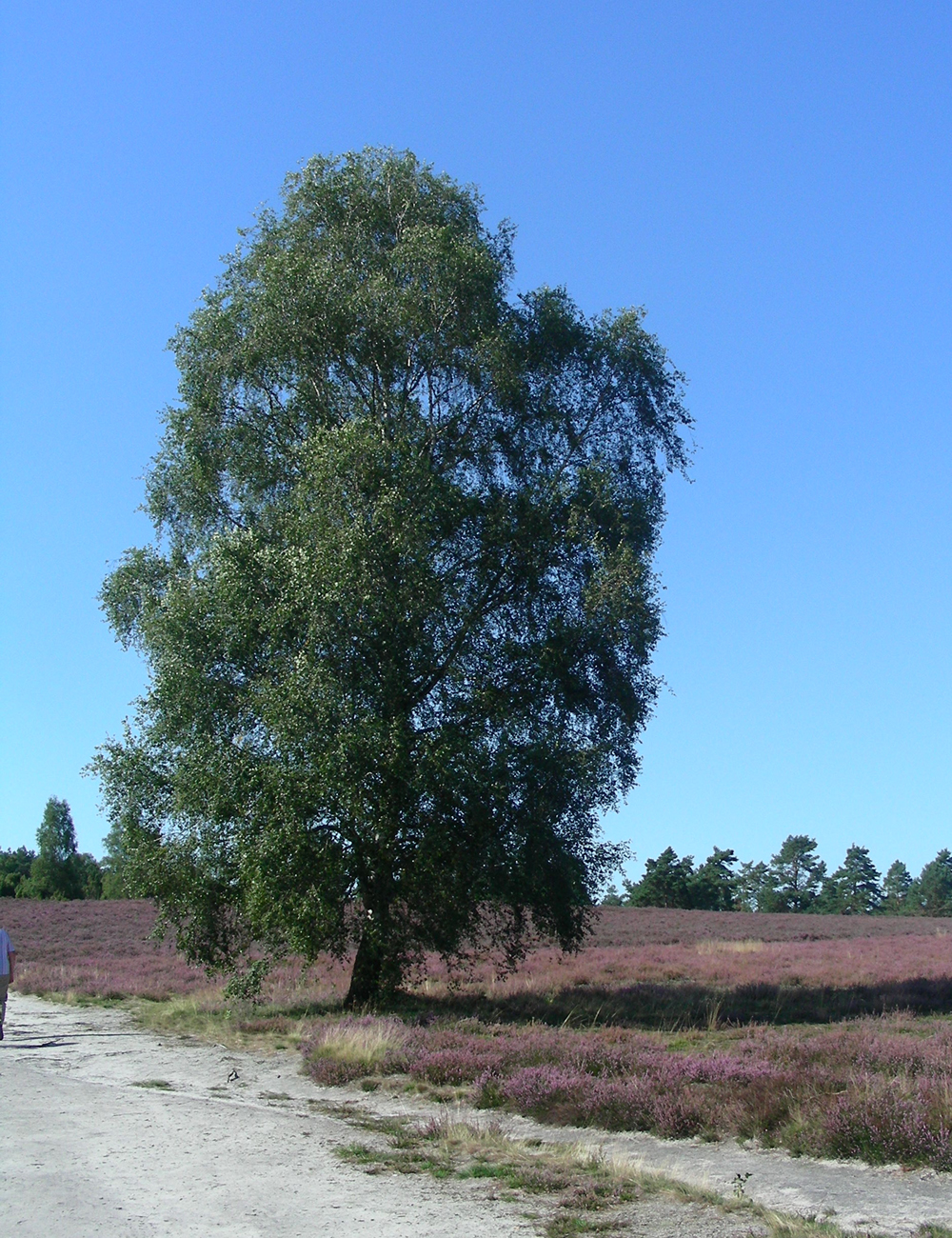
Heathland on the Wietzer Berg near Müden (Örtze)

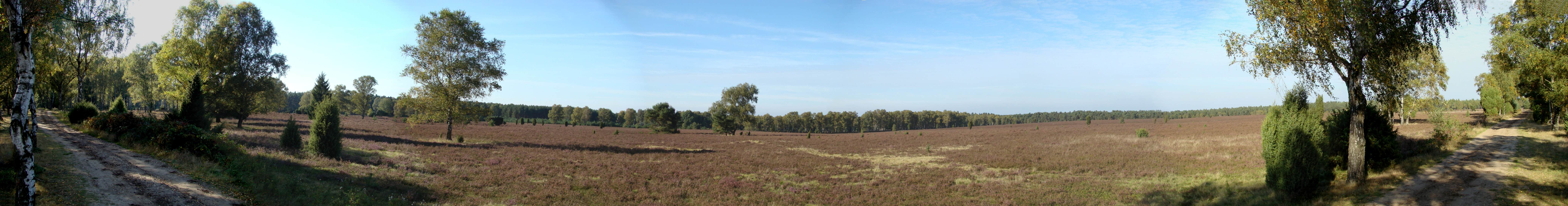
Large area of heath and the Birkenweg path between Faßberg and Unterlüß

== Natural disasters ==
=== Lower Saxony Hurricane of 1972 ===
On 13 November 1972 hurricane Quimburga passed over the Südheide Nature Park and left severe storm damage behind in the woodlands in the form of fallen trees. Due to the enormous damage that the hurricane wrought in Lower Saxony it became known as the Lower Saxony Hurricane.

=== Forest fire of 1975 ===
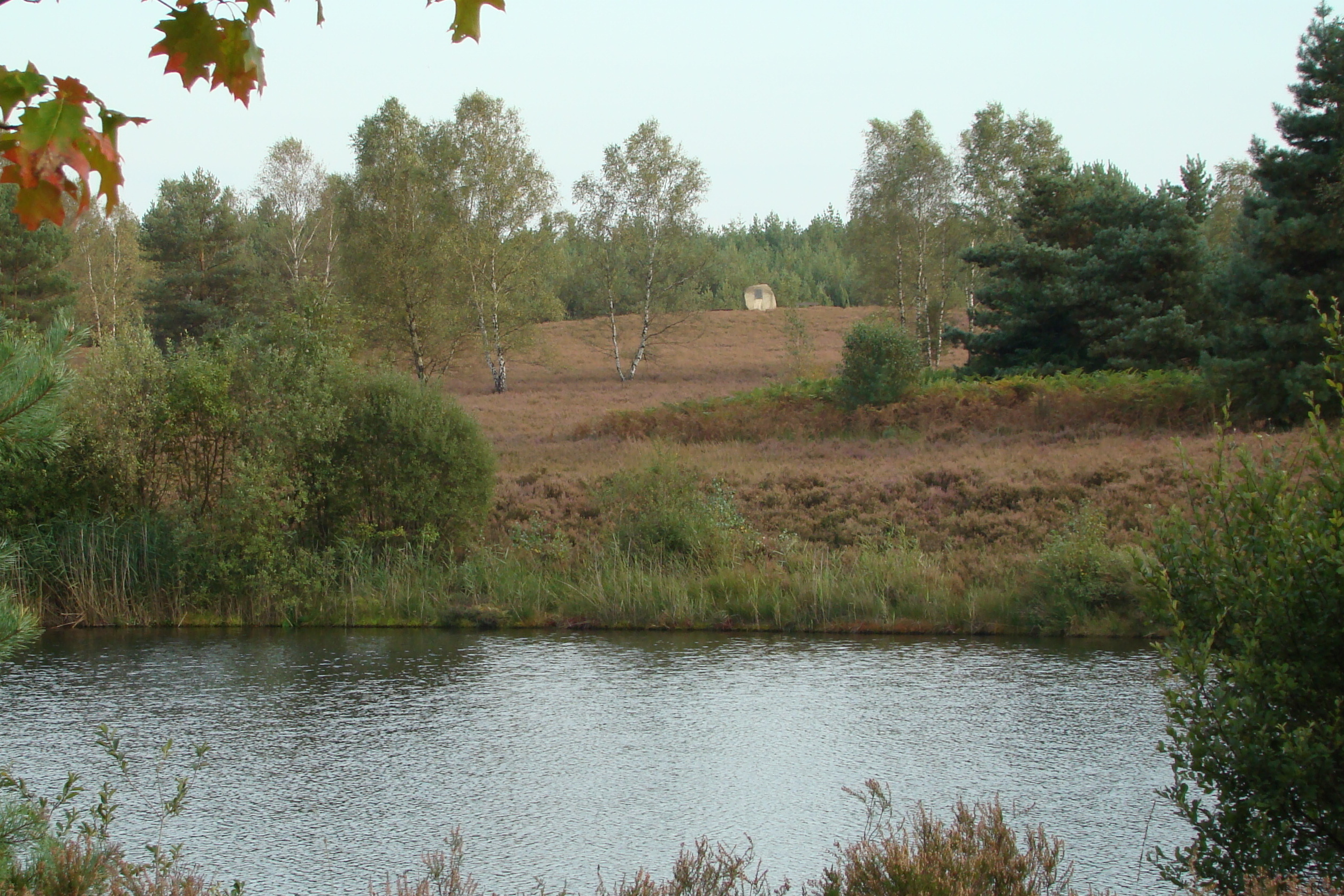
Newly laid fire pond – in the background a memorial stone. The fire started not far from this spot on 10 August 1975

The fire on the Lüneburg Heath in 1975 was the largest forest fire in the history of Germany and destroyed large parts of the Südheide Nature Park. One of the sources of the fire developed on 9 August 1975 around 12:50 pm in the area of Unterlüß/Schmarbeck. On the following day at 12:30 pm between Eschede and Oldendorf near the village of Queloh (Eschede) another forest fire was reported. In the pine monocultures the fire spread rapidly. On us. 10 August the Lüneburg president explained the disaster situation. The local fire services under the leadership of the Oberkreisdirektors were not longer able to contain the situation. Not until the Bundeswehr took over the operation was the fire fighting coordinated professionally. On 18 August the worst outbreak was under control and the emergency could be declared over. About 6,000 hectares of woodland, moor and heath were ravaged by the fire.

=== Consequences for the nature park ===
In reforesting the areas destroyed by storm and forest fire it was initially thought that pine monocultures should be abandoned. More deciduous trees (oaks and beech) should be planted. Soil investigations revealed, however, that deciduous trees would only be able to establish in a few places due to the poor sandy soil. The forest fire had also destroyed much of the available humus soil. On the edge of the forests, larch was planted in places in order to act as fire protection. Otherwise the scorched areas were again uniformly reforested with pines.

In order to be better equipped for future forest fires, metalled tracks were built exclusively for fire engines. At lakes, fish ponds or gravel pits in the area, water take-off points were installed. In addition new water storage ponds for firefighting were built in the Südheide. Where there are no rivers for water collection, old heating oil tanks were used as water supply tanks, each with between 20,000 and 100,000 litres of water in the ground.

== See also ==
- List of nature parks in Germany
- Lüneburg Heath
