= Heath beekeeping =

Specialist form of beekeeping practiced by Lüneburg beekeepers during the Middle Ages

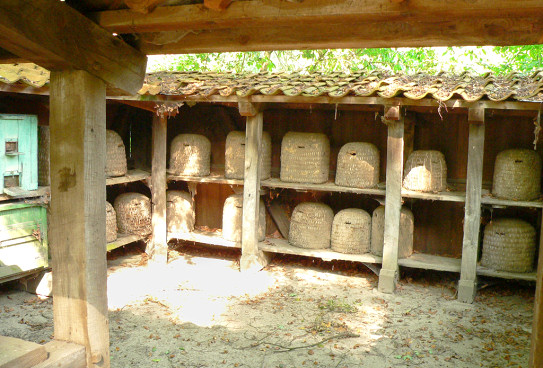
A Bienenzaun apiary with basket hives at the Rischmannshof Heath Museum

Heath beekeeping (German: Heideimkerei) was a specialist form of beekeeping, which was intensively practised by beekeepers on the Lüneburg Heath from the Middle Ages until the 19th century, but which is now very rarely encountered. It was also referred to as Lüneburger Schwarmbienenzucht (Lüneburg honey bee breeding) Lüneburger Heideimkerei (Lüneburg Heath beekeeping) or Lüneburger Korbimkerei (Lüneburg basket beekeeping). Typical features were beehives made of plaited straw baskets or skeps, the use of heathland flowers, frequent moving of bees to worthwhile feeding areas and the enormous multiplication of bee colonies through swarming.

== Methods ==
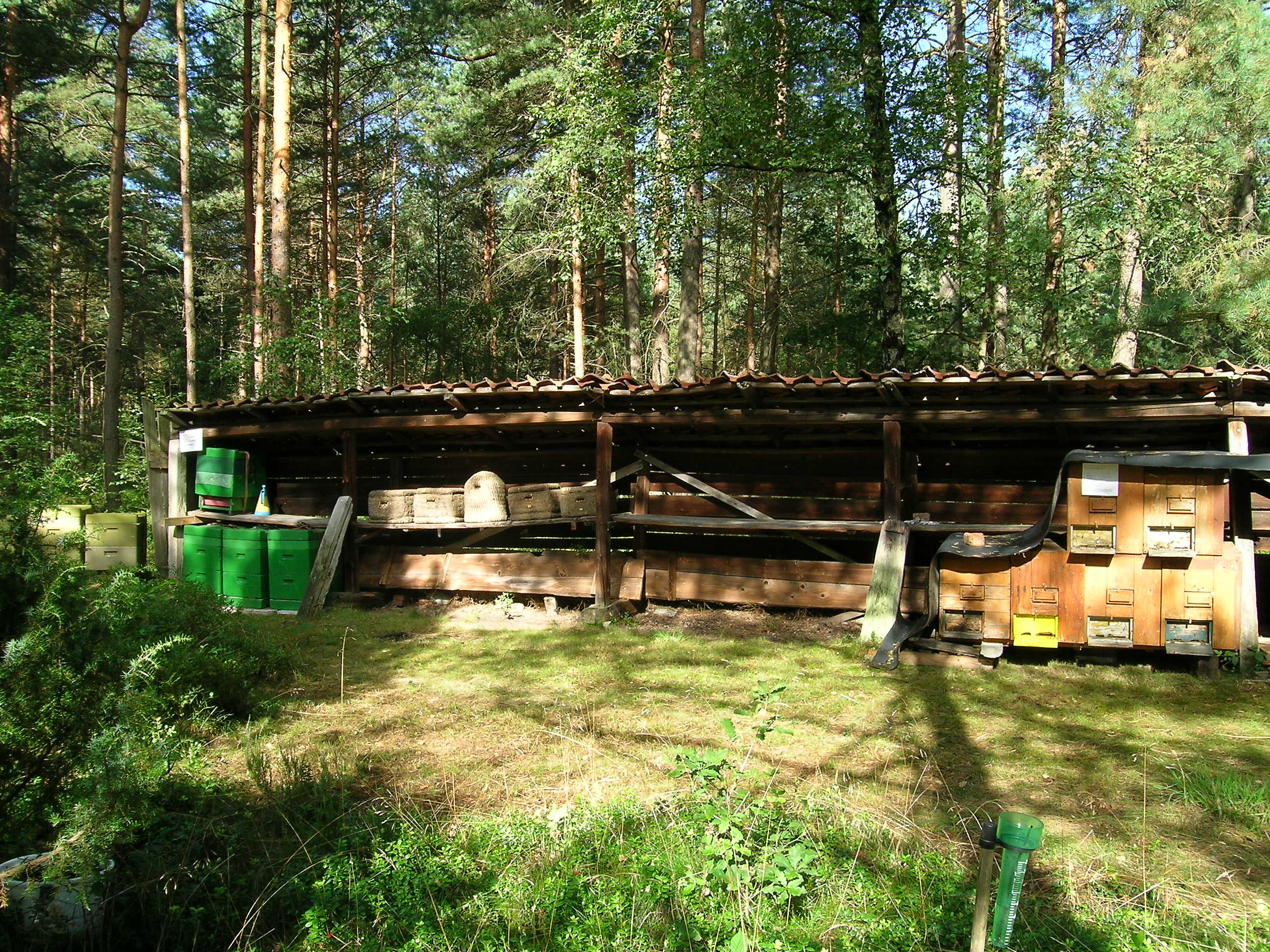
Apiary on the edge of a wood in the Südheide with(from left) modern plastic boxes, Kanitz baskets, a Lüneburg skep and wooden trays

Heath beekeeping is a special form of beekeeping used to obtain heather honey. It involves a transportable, swarming hive in which the beekeeper only allows a small number of colonies to overwinter. In spring, the number of colonies increases many times through the process of swarming, and several hundred were not unusual. Over the centuries, by selecting bees that swarm early and often, beekeepers on the heathlands developed an extremely swarm-loving and robust strain from the European dark bee.

The once widespread Bienenzaun (bee enclosure) apiary provided plenty of space. Beehives were made from straw into a plaited basket, the Lüneburger Stülper or Lüneburg Skep and, in the 1940s and 50s the Kanitz Basket (Kanitzkorb), named after its inventor, was also used. Because there was not usually enough local forage for the many hives concentrated into one place, the beekeepers had to move the bees around to areas where there were worthwhile sources of nectar. The new colonies formed in the early spring from swarms, collected honey from the blossoming heathlands in late summer, mainly in August and September. After the honey was harvested the superfluous colonies were removed from their baskets and sold as 'bare' colonies without honeycombs. These bees were very keen to swarm.

== History ==
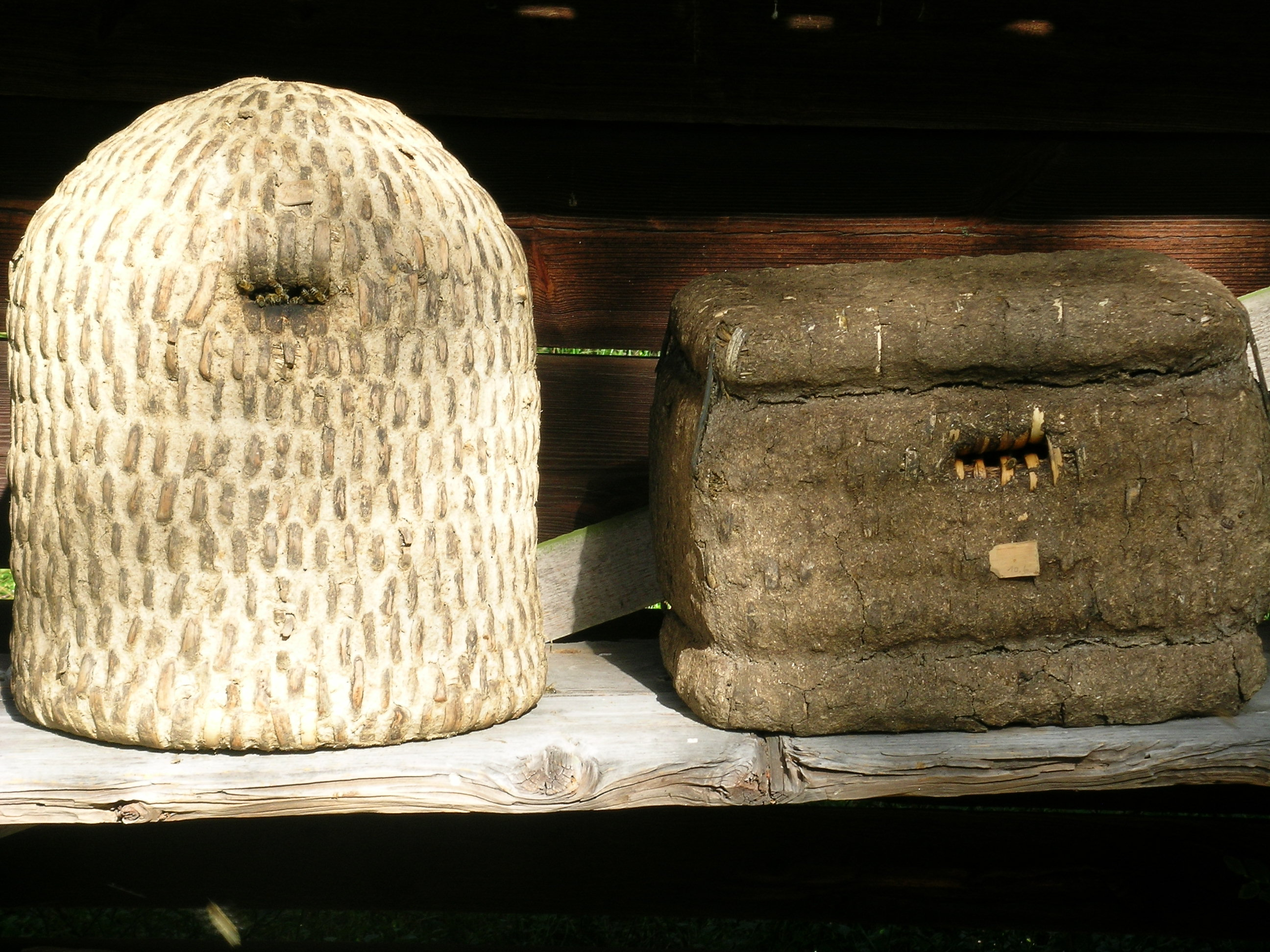
A Lüneburg skep (links) and a straw Kanitz basket

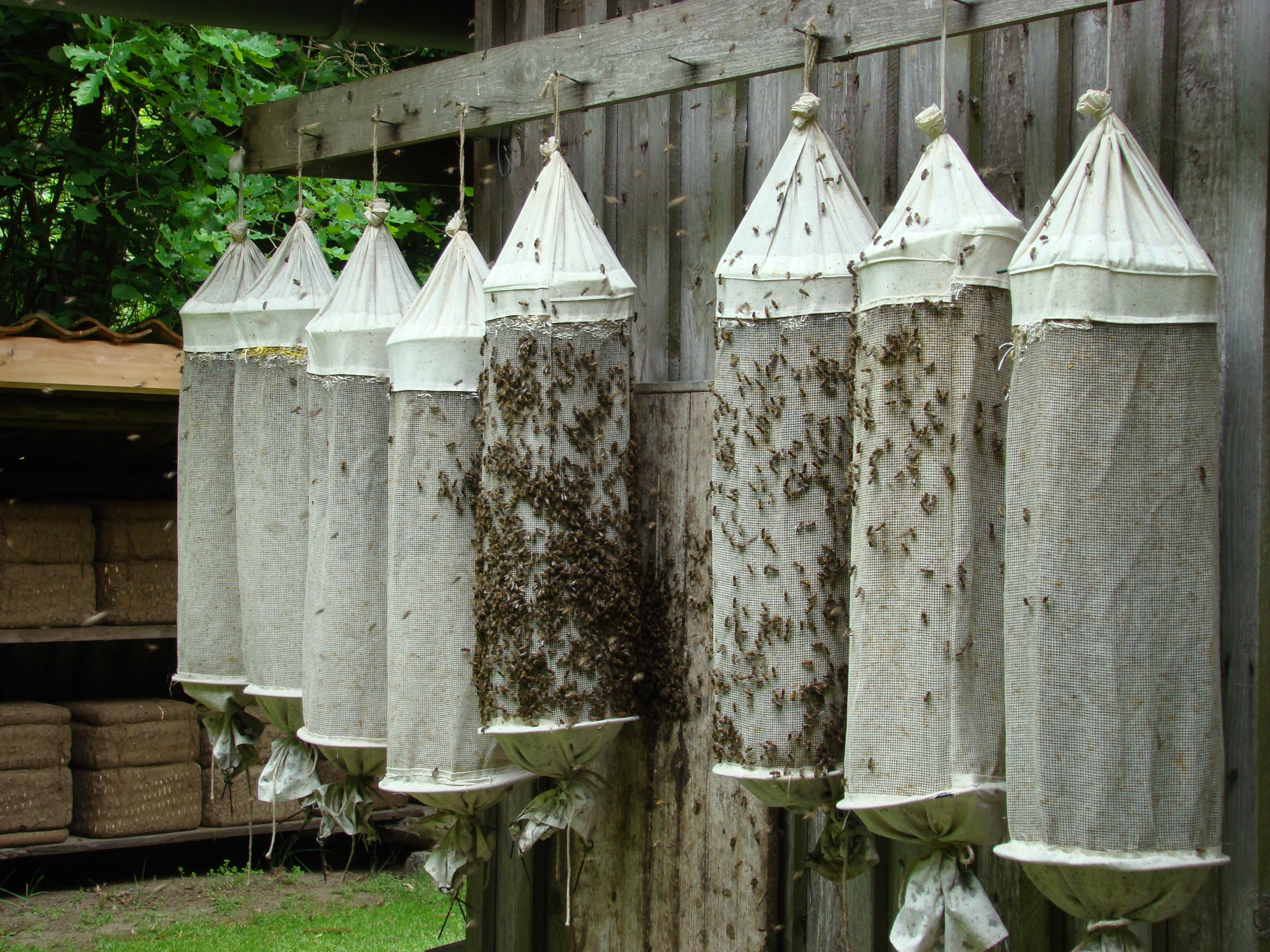
Swarm sacks with captured swarms of bees

For centuries, the historical basket or heath beehive produced honey and beeswax on the Lüneburg Heath. In the Middle Ages heather honey was a sought-after commodity. Beekeeping was common in the core areas of the former heath, so that almost every farmstead had a Bienenzaun. The farmers employed special beekeeping hands for this purpose. The town of Celle on the Südheide was a major trading centre for heather honey. As early as the 16th century there was a professional apiculture centre. It declined during the second half of the 19th century for a number of reasons, which led to the retreat of the areas of heathland. As a result of land consolidation there were no areas of common land with their wide range of nectar-producing plants. The introduction of artificial fertiliser enabled better harvest yields from heath soils and so areas of heath were turned into arable land. Marshland soils with buckwheat cultivation were turned into meadows for cattle. In addition, large areas of heath were reforested with fast-growing pines. Today there are only a very few apiaries left on the Lüneburg Heath which keep bees in the historical way. These also produce comb honey which is a specialty today due to its rarity.

== See also ==
- Beekeeping in the Südheide Nature Park

== Literature ==
- Hans-Günther Brockmann: Gerät der Korbimker in der Lüneburger Heide, Hildesheim, 2005, ISBN 3-8067-8507-4
- Georg Heinrich Lehzen: Die Hauptstücke aus der Betriebsweise der Lüneburger Bienenzucht, 165 Seiten, Erstauflage 1880, Neuauflage durch Heinrich Holtermann GmbH & Co. KG
- Friedrich Trauegott Schmidt: Der Bienenbau in Körben, oder Niedersächsischer Bienenvater, Leipzig: Crusius, 1768,
- Video series: Heath beekeeping (8 parts, 1982–1987) published by the Institut für den Wissenschaftlichen Film. Made available on the AV portal of the Technische Informationsbibliothek.
