= Central Lüß Plateau Heathland =

Nature reserve in Lower Saxony, Germany

Coordinates: 52°48′50″N 10°09′46″E

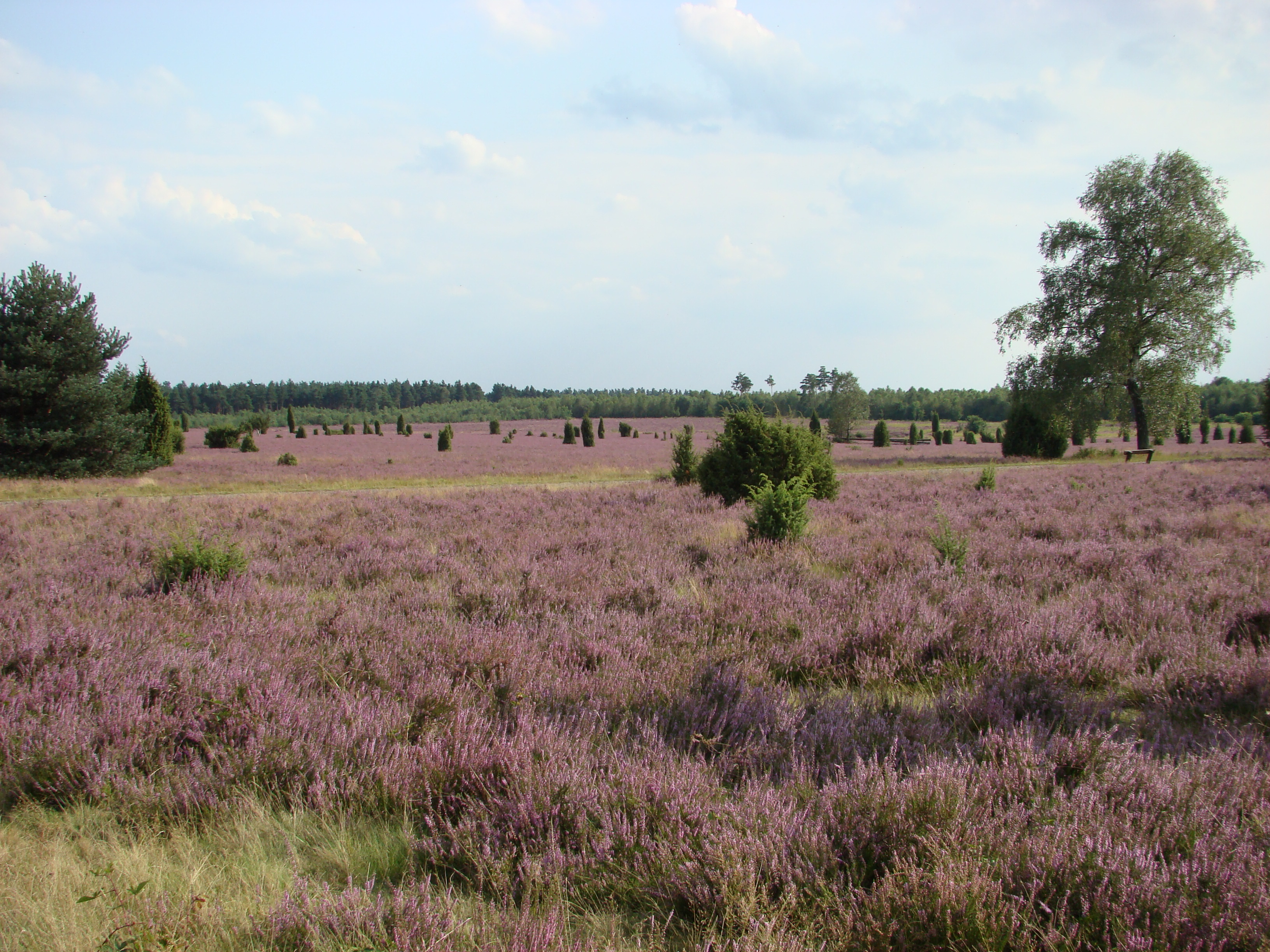
Heath flowers in Tiefental

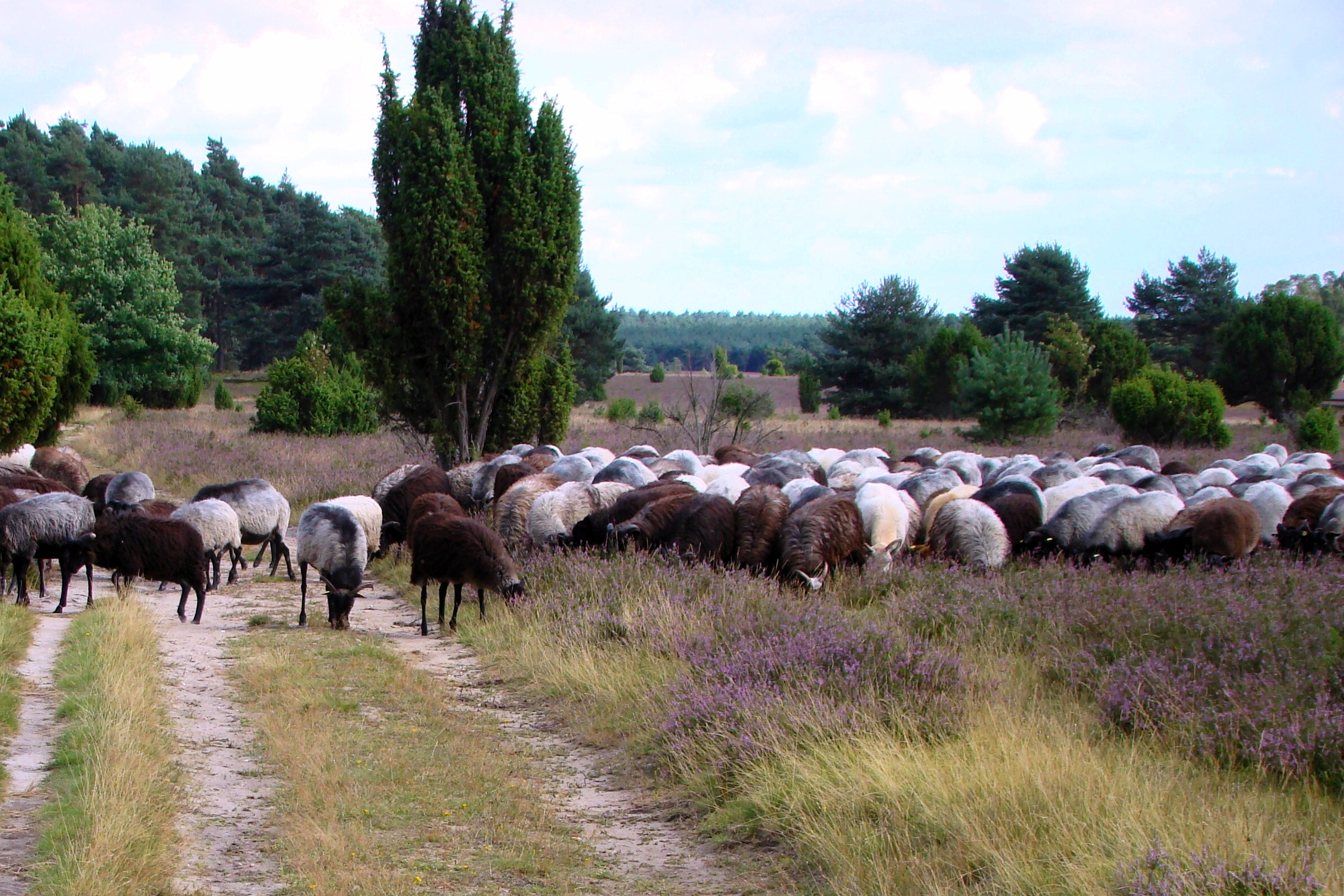
The Heidschnucken - moorland sheep on the Misselhorn Heath

The Central Lüß Plateau Heathland (German: Heideflächen mittleres Lüßplateau) are a nature reserve within the Südheide Nature Park with a total area of about 293 hectares (720 acres). They were placed under protection in 1995 and consist of three physically separate areas of land: the Misselhorn Heath (Misselhorner Heide), the Schillohsberg Heath (Heide am Schillohsberg) and the Weesener Weg Heathland (Heideflächen am Weesener Weg). The region referred to as Heathland and Rough Pasture in the Südheide (Heiden und Magerrasen in der Südheide) with an area of 278.3 hectares (688 acres) was also declared as Special Area of Conservation No. 277. The conservation agency responsible is the district of Celle.

The Misselhorn Heath, with a section that is known as the Tiefental, has an area of about 209 hectares (520 acres). It begins 2 km east of Hermannsburg and consists predominantly of heath. These are almost exclusively covered by the common heather (Calluna vulgaris). Only occasionally, in the wetter locations, is the cross-leaved heath (Erica tetralix) also found. bladderworts (Utricularia), an endangered genus of carnivorous plants that occur in fresh water and wet soil, are found in several, smaller, boggy or wet locations, as is the spoonleaf sundew (Drosera intermedia), another protected carnivorous plant. Other plants found here include the protected common lousewort (Pedicularis sylvatica), which is on the red list of endangered vascular plants in Germany, and the rare marsh gentian (Gentiana pneumonanthe). Cottongrass is also found very occasionally in these reserves.

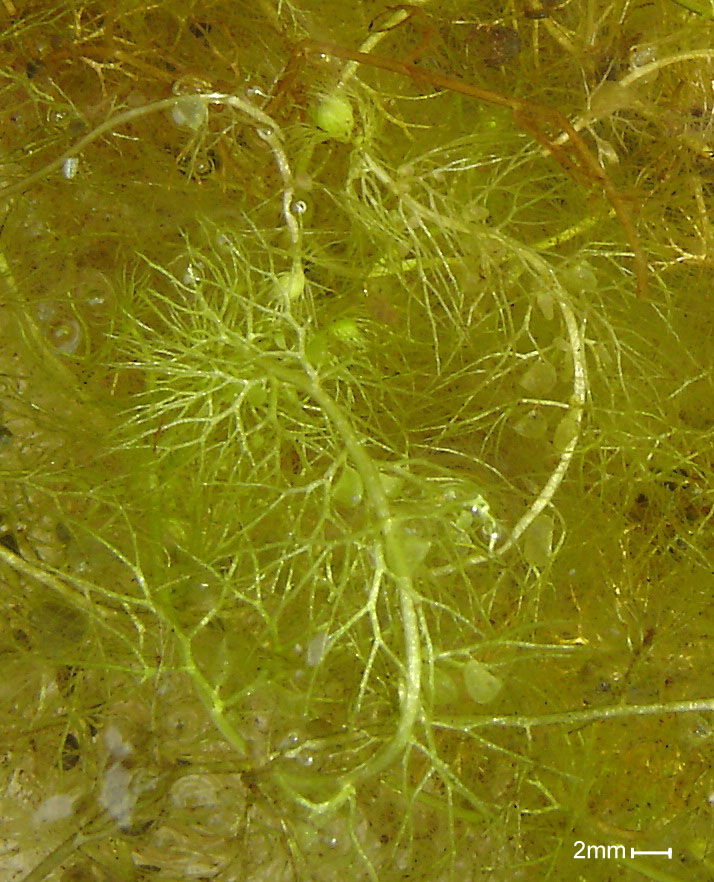
Bladderwort (Utricularia) with leaves and traps

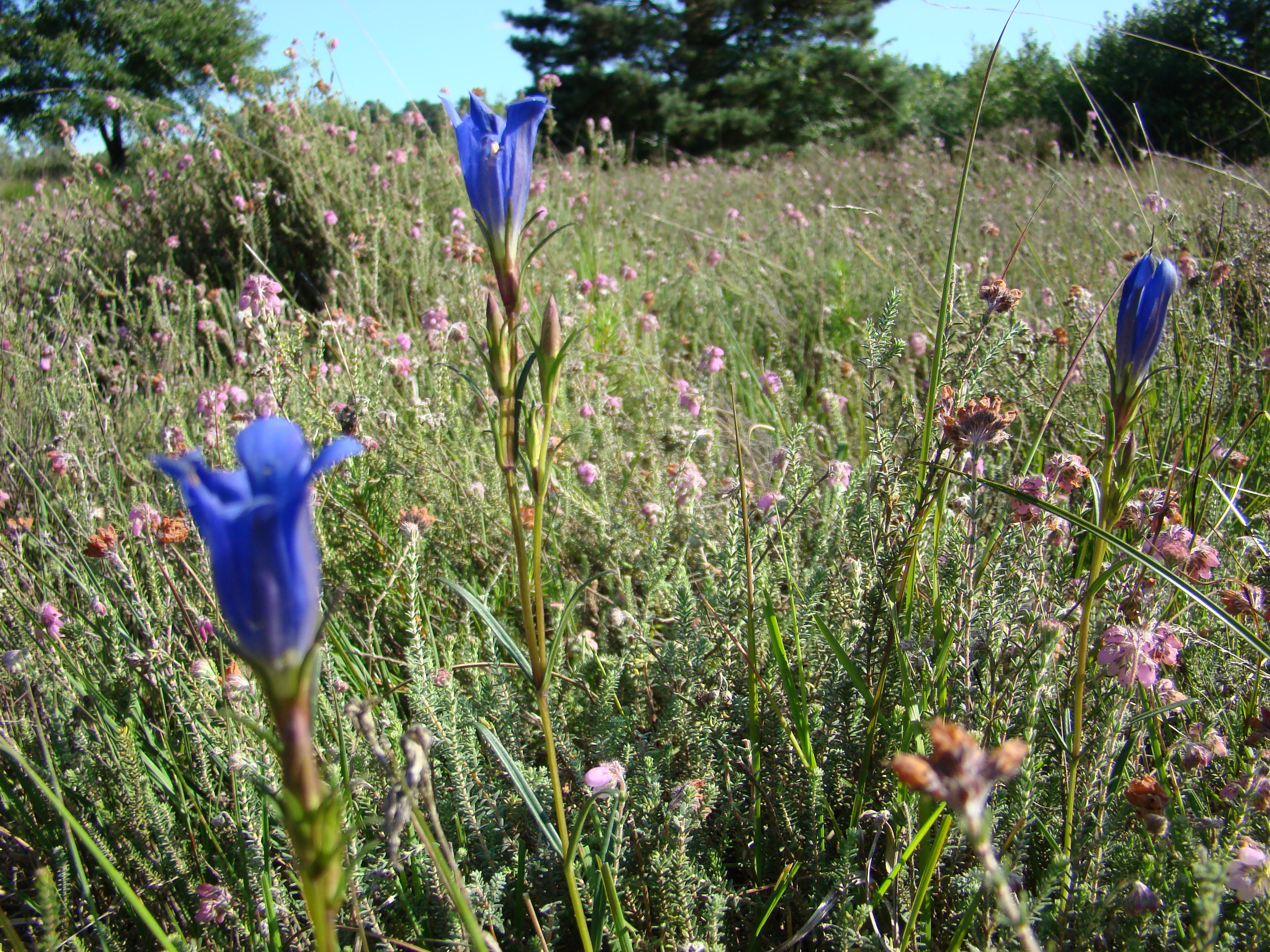
Marsh gentian and cross-leaved heath

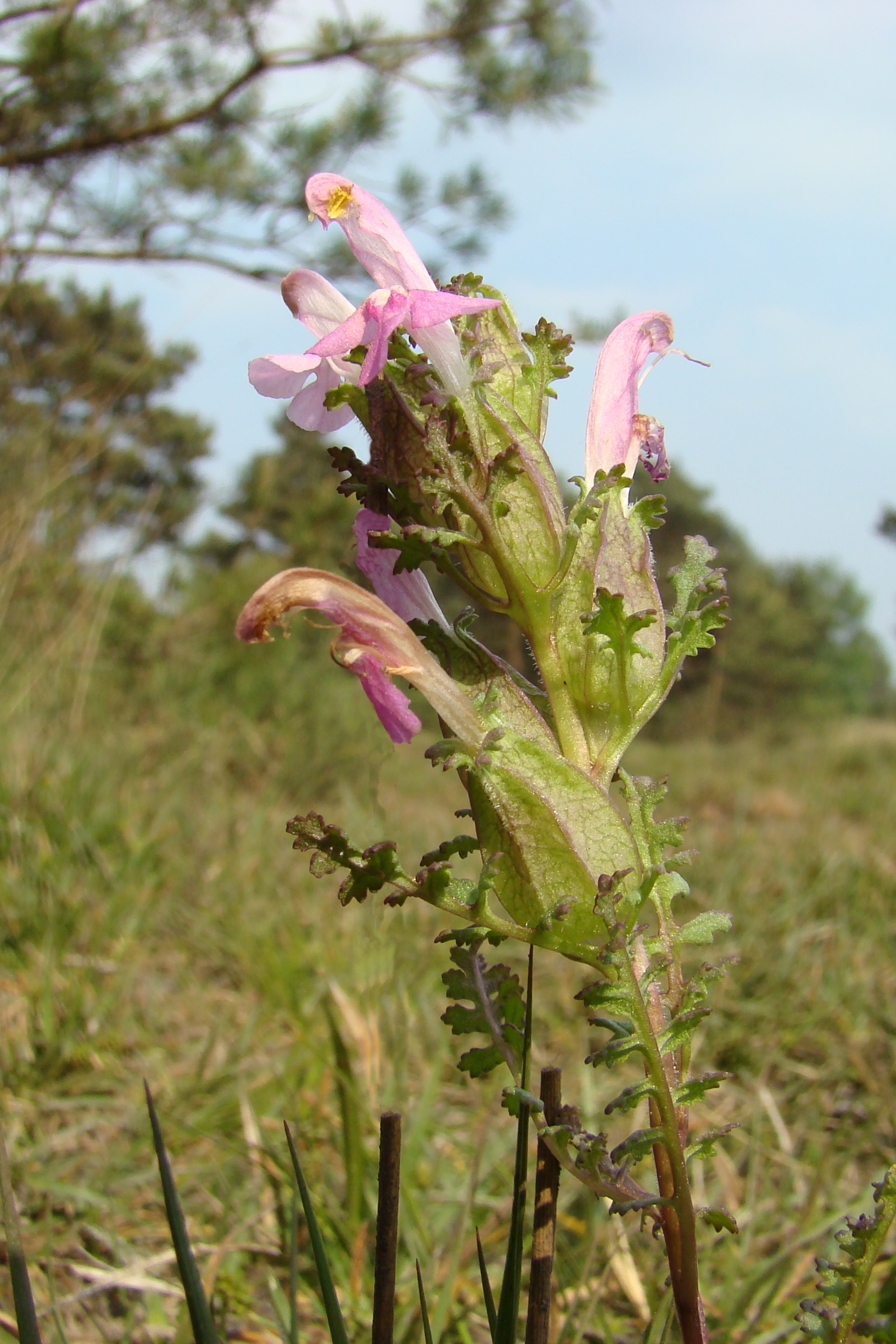
Common lousewort

The Schillohsberg Heath has an area of about 73 hectares (180 acres). It lies east of Lutterloh. It is a genuine heathland habitat, like the Weesener Weg Heathland which have an area of about 11 hectares (27 acres) and lie immediately north of Lutterloh.
