= Celle =

Town in Lower Saxony, Germany

- Town
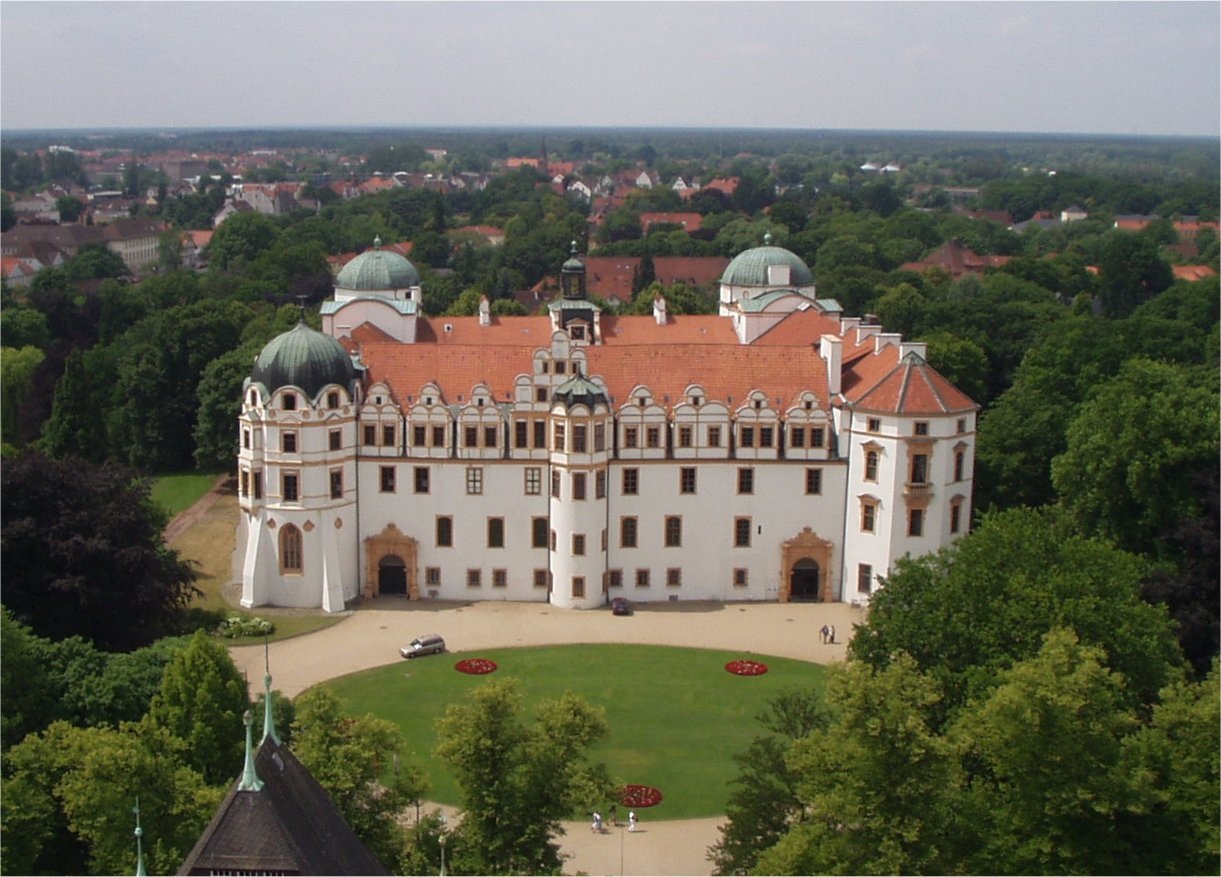
- Celle Castle

- Flag Coat of arms

- Location of Celle within Celle district
- Interactive map of Celle
- Location within Germany Location within Lower Saxony
- Coordinates: 52°37′32″N 10°04′57″E
- Country: Germany
- State: Lower Saxony
- District: Celle
- Subdivisions: 17 districts

Government
  - Mayor (2017–25): Jörg Nigge (CDU)

Area
  - Total: 176.02 km^{2} (67.96 sq mi)
- Elevation: 40 m (130 ft)

Population (2025-12-31)
  - Total: 66,930
  - Density: 380.2/km^{2} (984.8/sq mi)
- Time zone: UTC+01:00 (CET)
  - Summer (DST): UTC+02:00 (CEST)
- Postal codes: 29221–29229
- Dialling codes: 05141, 05145, 05086
- Vehicle registration: CE
- Website: www.celle.de

Celle (German pronunciation: [ˈtsɛlə]) is a town and capital of the district of Celle in Lower Saxony, in north-central Germany. The town is situated on the banks of the river Aller, a tributary of the Weser, and has a population of about 71,000. Celle is the southern gateway to the Lüneburg Heath, has a castle (Schloss Celle) built in the Renaissance and Baroque styles and a picturesque old town centre (the Altstadt) with more than 400 timber-framed houses, making Celle one of the most remarkable members of the German Timber-Frame Road. From 1378 to 1705 Celle was the official residence of the Lüneburg branch of the dukes of Brunswick-Lüneburg (House of Welf), who had been banished from their original ducal seat by its townsfolk.

== Geography ==
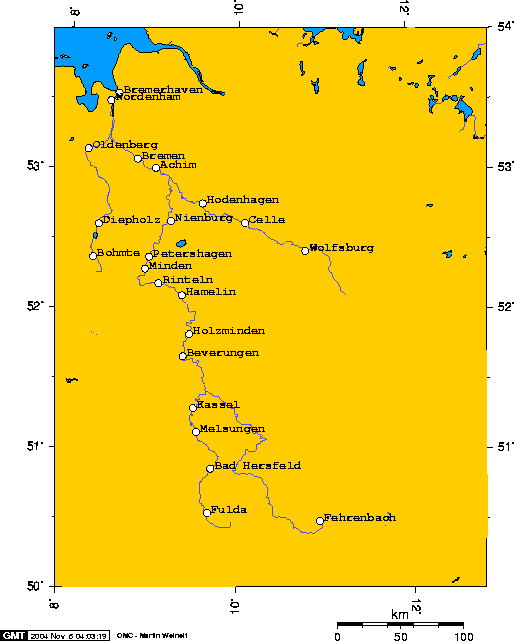
The Weser watershed, showing the location of Celle on the Aller.

The town of Celle lies in the glacial valley of the Aller, about 40 kilometres (25 mi) northeast of Hanover, 60 kilometres (37 mi) northwest of Brunswick and 120 kilometres (75 mi) south of Hamburg. With 71,000 inhabitants it is, next to Lüneburg, the largest Lower Saxon town between Hanover and Hamburg.

=== Expansion ===
The town covers an area of 176.05 square kilometres (67.97 mi^{2}). Flowing from the northeast, the Lachte discharges into the Aller within the town, as does the Fuhse flowing from the southeast. The Aller heads westwards towards Verden an der Aller, where it joins the Weser.

=== Climate ===
Celle's annual precipitation is 692 millimetres (27.2 in), which puts it in the middle third of locations in Germany. 39% of the Deutscher Wetterdienst's weather stations record lower values. The wettest month is August, which has 1.5 times the amount of precipitation as February, the driest month. Monthly precipitation varies only slightly and is very evenly spread throughout the year. Only 1% of German weather stations show a lower annual variation.

The Celle weather station has recorded the following extreme values:

- Its highest temperature was 37.5 °C (99.5 °F) on 9 August 1992.
- Its lowest temperature was −26.8 °C (−16.2 °F) on 27 January 1942.
- Its greatest annual precipitation was 982.7 mm (38.69 in) in 2002.
- Its least annual precipitation was 350.1 mm (13.78 in) in 1959.
- The longest annual sunshine was 1,959.6 hours in 2003.
- The shortest annual sunshine was 1,260.5 hours in 1970.

Climate data for Celle (1991–2020 normals, extremes 1940–present (Note: The meteorological station used from 1940 to 1978 was Celle (Stadt), the meteorological station used from 1979 to date was Celle, and temperature observations stopped in 2006.))
Month	Jan	Feb	Mar	Apr	May	Jun	Jul	Aug	Sep	Oct	Nov	Dec	Year
Record high °C (°F)	15.4 (59.7)	19.3 (66.7)	24.1 (75.4)	30.0 (86.0)	33.1 (91.6)	34.8 (94.6)	36.3 (97.3)	37.5 (99.5)	31.8 (89.2)	27.2 (81.0)	21.8 (71.2)	16.1 (61.0)	37.5 (99.5)
Mean maximum °C (°F)	11.6 (52.9)	13.2 (55.8)	16.9 (62.4)	22.3 (72.1)	27.5 (81.5)	30.0 (86.0)	31.3 (88.3)	31.9 (89.4)	25.8 (78.4)	20.2 (68.4)	14.1 (57.4)	11.6 (52.9)	33.6 (92.5)
Mean daily maximum °C (°F)	4.2 (39.6)	5.2 (41.4)	8.8 (47.8)	13.9 (57.0)	18.7 (65.7)	21.3 (70.3)	24.0 (75.2)	23.7 (74.7)	19.3 (66.7)	13.7 (56.7)	7.9 (46.2)	4.5 (40.1)	13.8 (56.8)
Daily mean °C (°F)	1.9 (35.4)	2.5 (36.5)	5.4 (41.7)	9.4 (48.9)	14.1 (57.4)	16.9 (62.4)	19.2 (66.6)	18.5 (65.3)	14.5 (58.1)	9.9 (49.8)	5.6 (42.1)	3.0 (37.4)	10.0 (50.0)
Mean daily minimum °C (°F)	−0.9 (30.4)	−0.7 (30.7)	1.4 (34.5)	4.5 (40.1)	8.6 (47.5)	11.4 (52.5)	14.0 (57.2)	13.6 (56.5)	10.1 (50.2)	6.0 (42.8)	2.6 (36.7)	−0.2 (31.6)	5.8 (42.4)
Mean minimum °C (°F)	−10.4 (13.3)	−9.4 (15.1)	−5.1 (22.8)	−2.7 (27.1)	2.0 (35.6)	5.5 (41.9)	9.2 (48.6)	8.1 (46.6)	3.7 (38.7)	−1.1 (30.0)	−4.2 (24.4)	−9.2 (15.4)	−12.9 (8.8)
Record low °C (°F)	−26.8 (−16.2)	−23.9 (−11.0)	−18.2 (−0.8)	−7.5 (18.5)	−4.3 (24.3)	0.2 (32.4)	2.2 (36.0)	2.5 (36.5)	−1.5 (29.3)	−7.8 (18.0)	−14.8 (5.4)	−21.8 (−7.2)	−26.8 (−16.2)
Average precipitation mm (inches)	63.2 (2.49)	45.5 (1.79)	49.6 (1.95)	42.0 (1.65)	53.0 (2.09)	54.6 (2.15)	74.6 (2.94)	66.1 (2.60)	56.7 (2.23)	60.1 (2.37)	54.5 (2.15)	59.7 (2.35)	689.0 (27.13)
Average extreme snow depth cm (inches)	5.2 (2.0)	4.4 (1.7)	2.0 (0.8)	0.4 (0.2)	0.5 (0.2)	0 (0)	0 (0)	0 (0)	0 (0)	0 (0)	1.2 (0.5)	3.3 (1.3)	9.3 (3.7)
Average precipitation days (≥ 0.1 mm)	18.9	16.3	15.8	12.9	12.7	13.4	15.3	15.2	13.7	16.4	17.1	18.0	187.2
Average snowy days (≥ 1.0 cm)	5.3	5.8	1.7	0.1	0	0	0	0	0	0	1.1	2.8	16.8
Average relative humidity (%)	84.3	80.7	75.1	68.3	65.8	67.7	67.4	70.2	76.7	82.0	86.4	86.2	76.1
Mean monthly sunshine hours	49.9	63.9	108.9	162.4	211.7	207.0	225.9	209.8	155.6	109.0	46.4	37.1	1,591.5
Source 1: NOAA
Source 2: DWD (extremes)

=== Subdivisions ===
The town of Celle has the following 17 boroughs or Stadtteile, some of which were previously independent villages (population as at 1 January 2005): Altencelle (4,998), Altenhagen (922), Blumlage/Altstadt (8,526), Bostel (455), Boye (832), Garßen (2,978), Groß Hehlen (2,773), Hehlentor (7,974), Hustedt (736), Klein Hehlen (5,782), Lachtehausen (639), Neuenhäusen (8,082), Neustadt/Heese (10,887), Scheuen (1,165), Vorwerk (2,842), Westercelle (7,183) and Wietzenbruch (4,805).

== History ==
=== Middle Ages ===
Celle was first mentioned in a document of A.D. 985 as Kiellu (which means Fischbucht or fishing bay). It was granted the right to mint and circulate its own coins under the minting rights during the 11th century and several coins were found in the Sandur hoard in the Faroes. In 1292 Duke Otto II the Strict (1277–1330), a Welf who ruled the Principality of Lüneburg from 1277 to 1330, left Altencelle, where there had been defences in the form of a circular rampart (the Ringwall von Burg) since the 10th century, and founded a rectangular settlement by the existing castle (Burg) 4 kilometres (2.5 mi) to the northwest. In 1301 he granted Celle its town privileges and in 1308 started construction on the town church.

In 1378 Celle became the Residenz of the dukes of Saxe-Wittenberg and in 1433 the princes of Lüneburg took up residence in the castle (Schloss). The ducal palace was situated on a triangle between the Aller and its tributary, the Fuhse. A moat connecting the rivers was built in 1433, turning the town centre into an island. In 1452 Duke Frederick the Pious of Lüneburg founded a Franciscan monastery. In 1464 the grain shipping monopoly generated an economic upturn for the town.

=== Early modern period ===
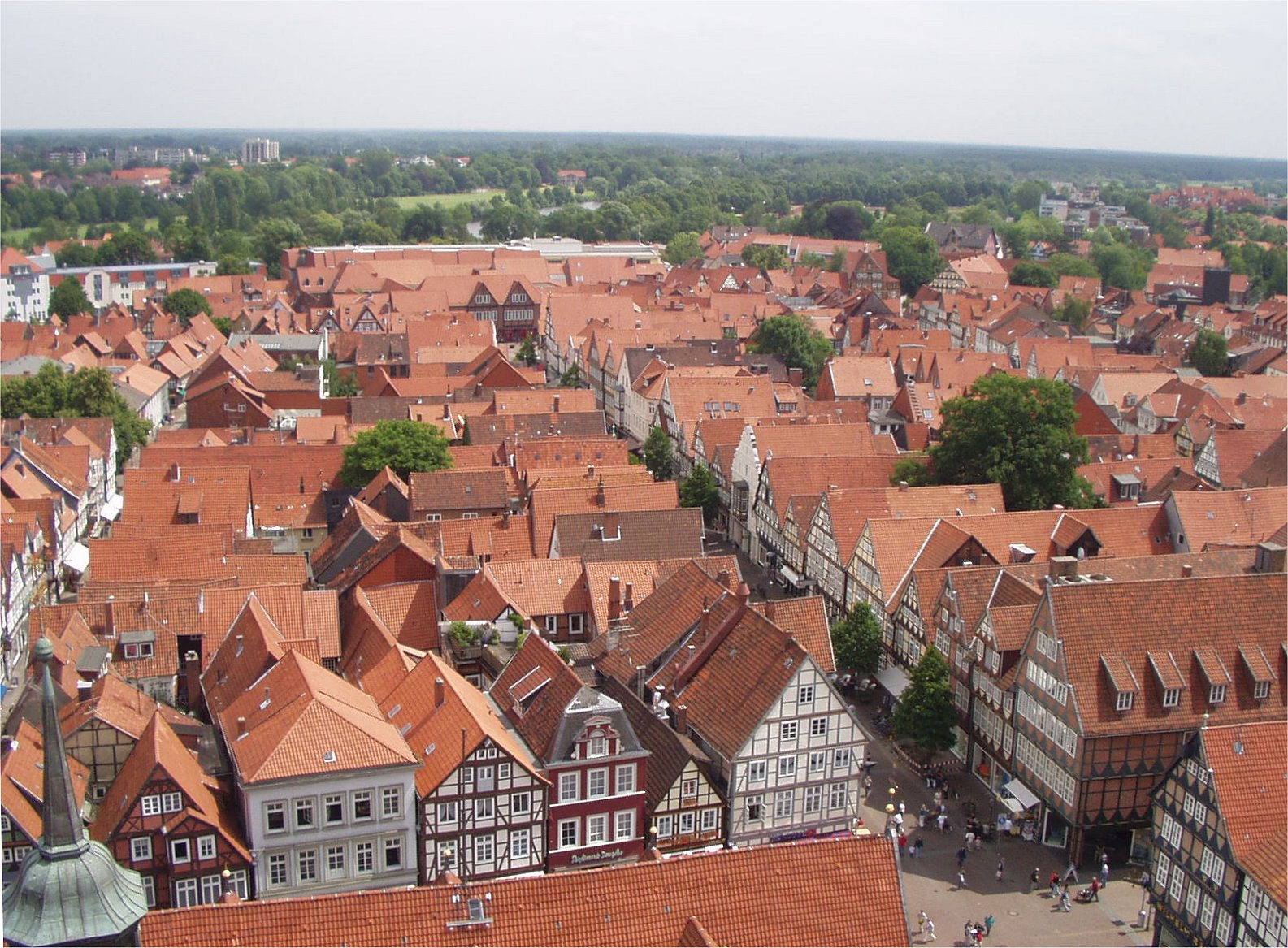
Rooftop view of Celle

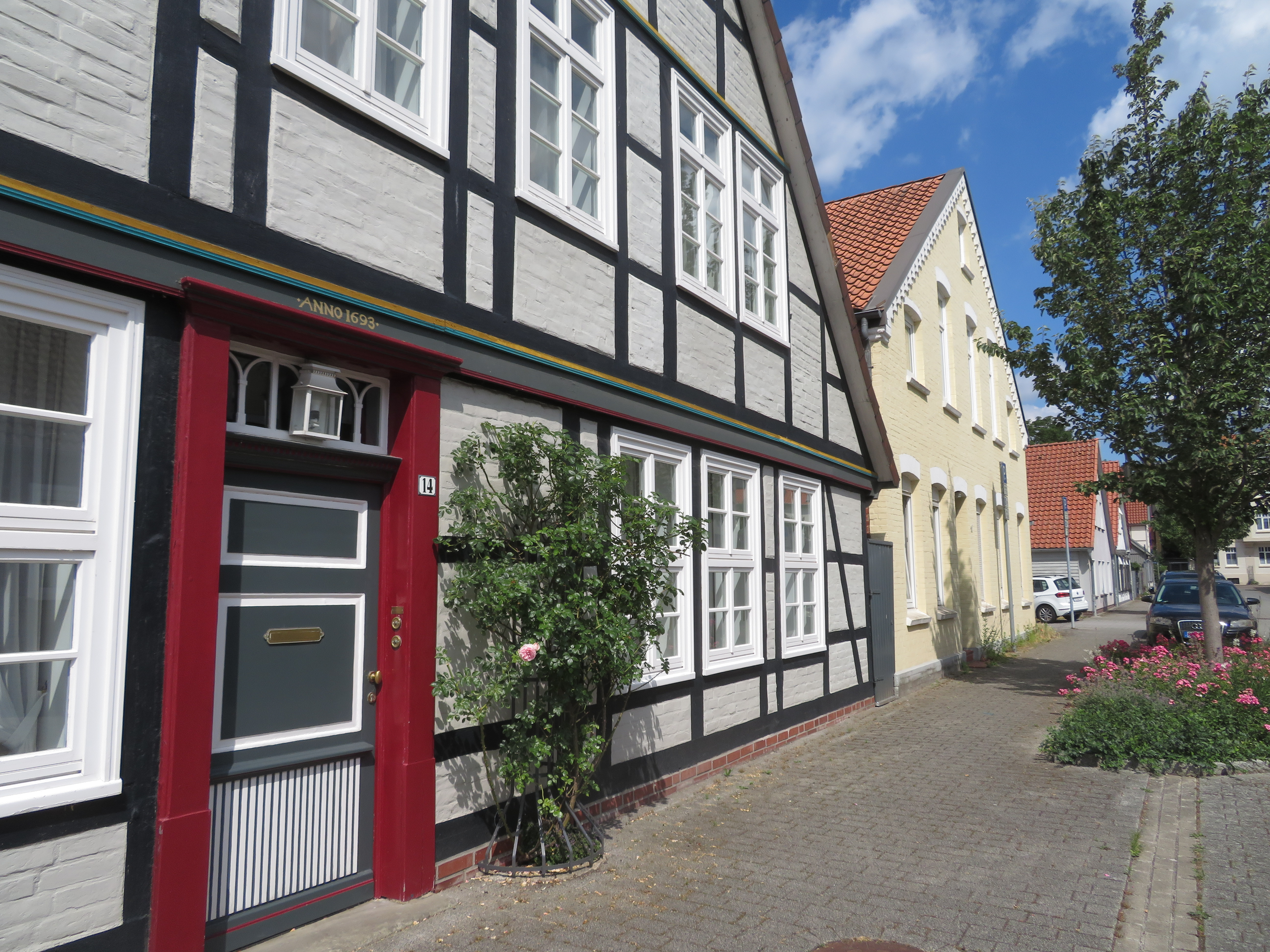
Hugenottenstraße is the main street of the former French quarter

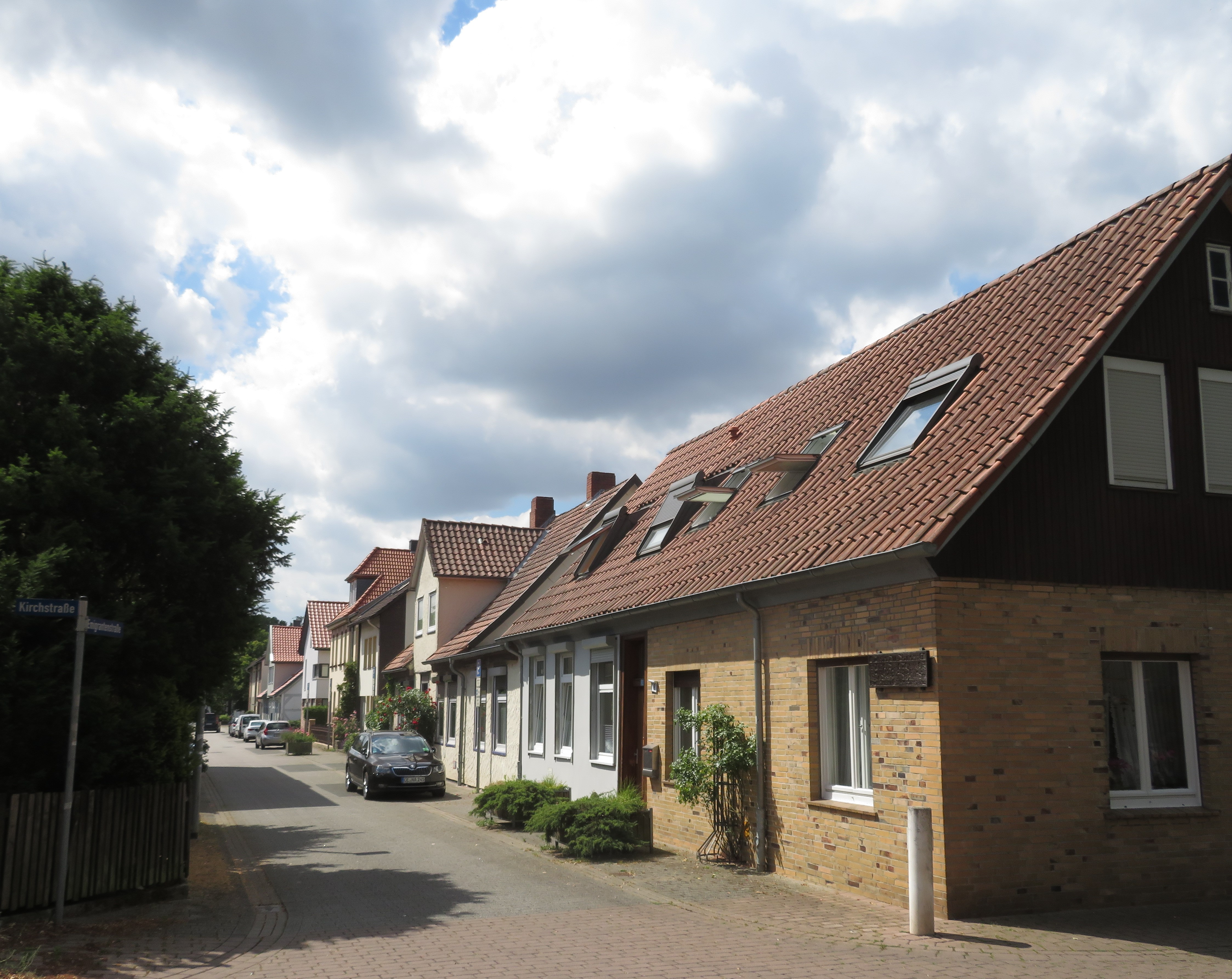
Emigrantenstraße, a historical street laid out for Austrian refugees

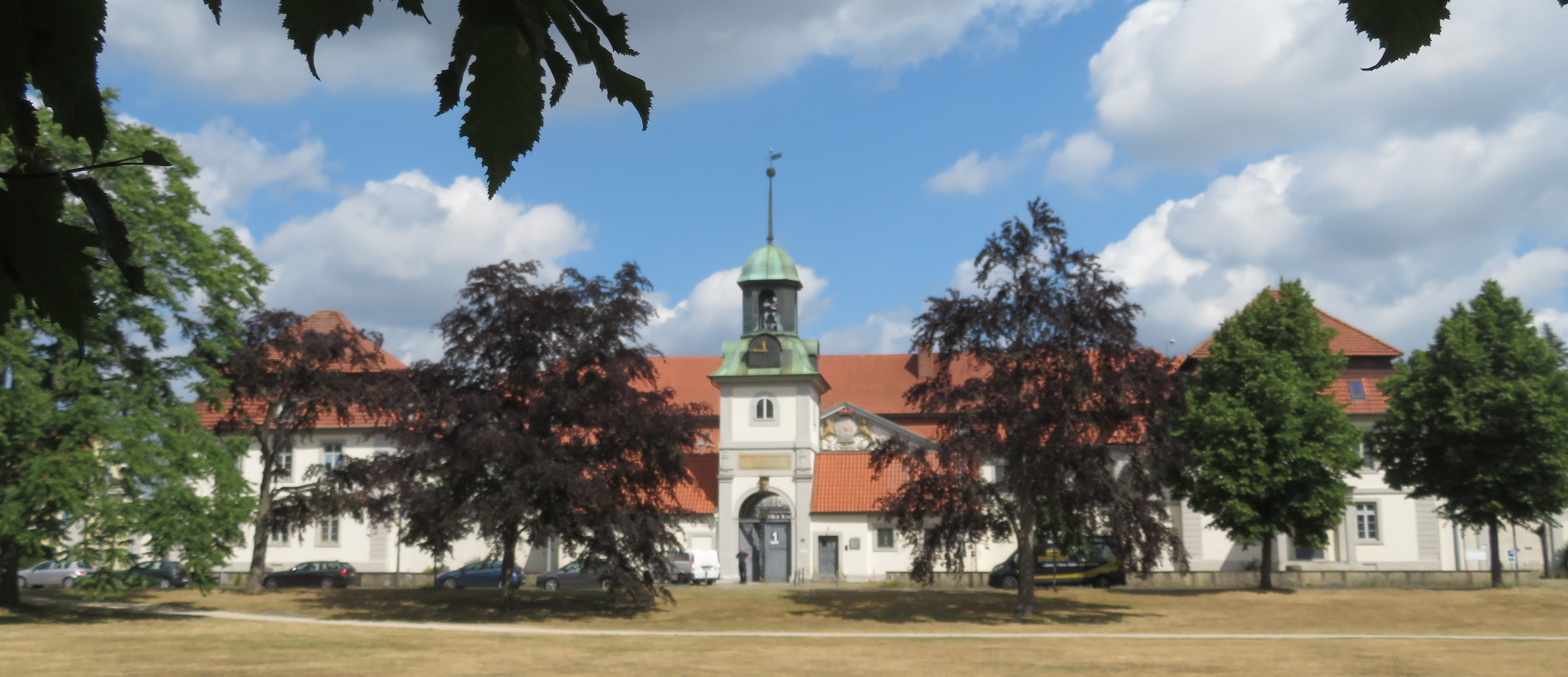
JVA Celle which is often mistaken for a castle

In 1524 the Reformation was introduced into Celle. In 1570 Duke William the Younger built the castle chapel, which was consecrated in 1585.

In 1660 Celle had 3,750 inhabitants. From 1665 to 1705 Celle experienced a cultural boom as a Residenz under Duke George William. This has been put down in particular to his French wife, Eleonore d'Olbreuse, who brought fellow Huguenot Christians and Italian architects to Celle. During this time the French and Italian Gardens were laid out and the baroque castle theatre built. Because of the persecution of Huguenots under Louis XIV many French Huguenots sought refuge in Germany, especially in Berlin and in the towns of Celle, Neuwied and Hanau. About 300 Huguenots settled in Celle, where a new residential area was laid out for them in the southwest of the centre. Its main street, Hugenottenstrasse, is still a sightworthy historical street with well-preserved wooden houses built at the beginning of the 18th century. Many French refugees worked in the castle as cooks and servants, but some of them opened shops in Celle as tailors, carpenters, joiners, confectioners, wig makers and glovers, thus introducing some French cuisine, fashion and lifestyle into the town. Some years later Protestant refugees from Austria sought refuge in Celle as well. Emigrantenstraße is another historical street, which was laid out for the Austrians.

In 1705 the last duke of the Brunswick–Lüneburg line died and Celle, along with the Principality of Lüneburg, passed back to the Hanover line of the Welfs. By way of compensation for the loss of its status as a Residenz town numerous administrative institutions were established in Celle, such as the Higher Court of Appeal (Oberappellationsgericht), the prison and the State Stud Farm. That began its development into an administrative and judicial centre. Even today the Lower Saxony-Bremen State Social Security Tribunal and the High Court responsible for most of Lower Saxony are based in Celle, amongst others.

Celle is also still home to a prison (the Justizvollzugsanstalt Celle or JVA Celle), which was built in a baroque style in the west of the city centre between 1710 and 1731. Sometimes tourists mistake it for a castle because of its typical baroque architecture. That the citizens of Celle once − in a vote − chose to have a prison in Celle rather than a university in order to protect the virtue of their daughters is not verifiable but it has remained a persistent anecdote in popular folklore.

In August 1714 George Elector of Hanover, Duke of Brunswick–Lüneburg (King George I) ascended to the British throne. Between then and 1866, when the town became Prussian during the Austro-Prussian War as part of the province of Hanover, Celle was a possession of the British Hanoverian line.

In 1786 Albrecht Thaer founded the first German Agricultural Testing Institute in the meadows in the Dammasch (dam marsh) (today Thaer's Garden). The Albrecht-Thaer School is nowadays part of a vocational centre in the Celle sub-district of Altenhagen.

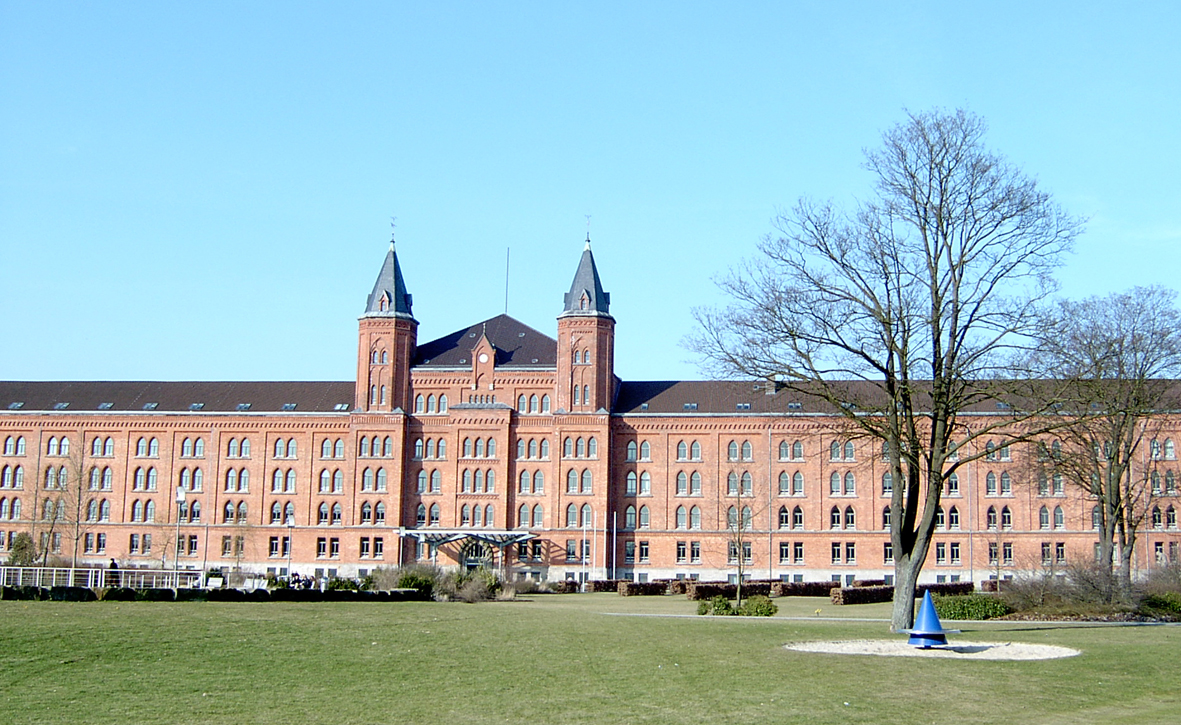
New Town Hall

=== Modern period ===
In 1842 the Cambridge Dragoons Barracks (Cambridge-Dragoner-Kaserne) for the homonymous regiment named after the Hanoveran Viceroy Duke Prince Adolphus, Duke of Cambridge, was built in Celle. After being extended in 1913 and partially rebuilt after a fire in 1936, it was renamed Goodwood Barracks in 1945 and from 1976 to 1996 was the headquarters of Panzerbrigade 33 in the German armed forces, the Bundeswehr. In 1989 it was renamed again to Cambridge-Dragoner-Kaserne. Since 1996 the area has mainly been used to house one of the largest youth centres in Lower Saxony.

From 1869 to 1872 an infantry barracks was built for the 77th Infantry Regiment which also gave the main street (running the length of the front of the barracks) its name of 77er Strasse. In 1938 it was renamed the Heidekaserne ("Heath Barracks"). After the Second World War the barracks was used by British troops until 1993 during which time 94 Locating Regiment Royal Artillery held residency for over 25 years, followed briefly by 14 Signal Regiment, which relocated from Scheuen until the barracks were handed back to the local authorities. Today the New Town Hall (Neue Rathaus) and Celle Council Offices are housed in the restored brick building. Residential buildings and a town park have been established on the rest of the terrain.

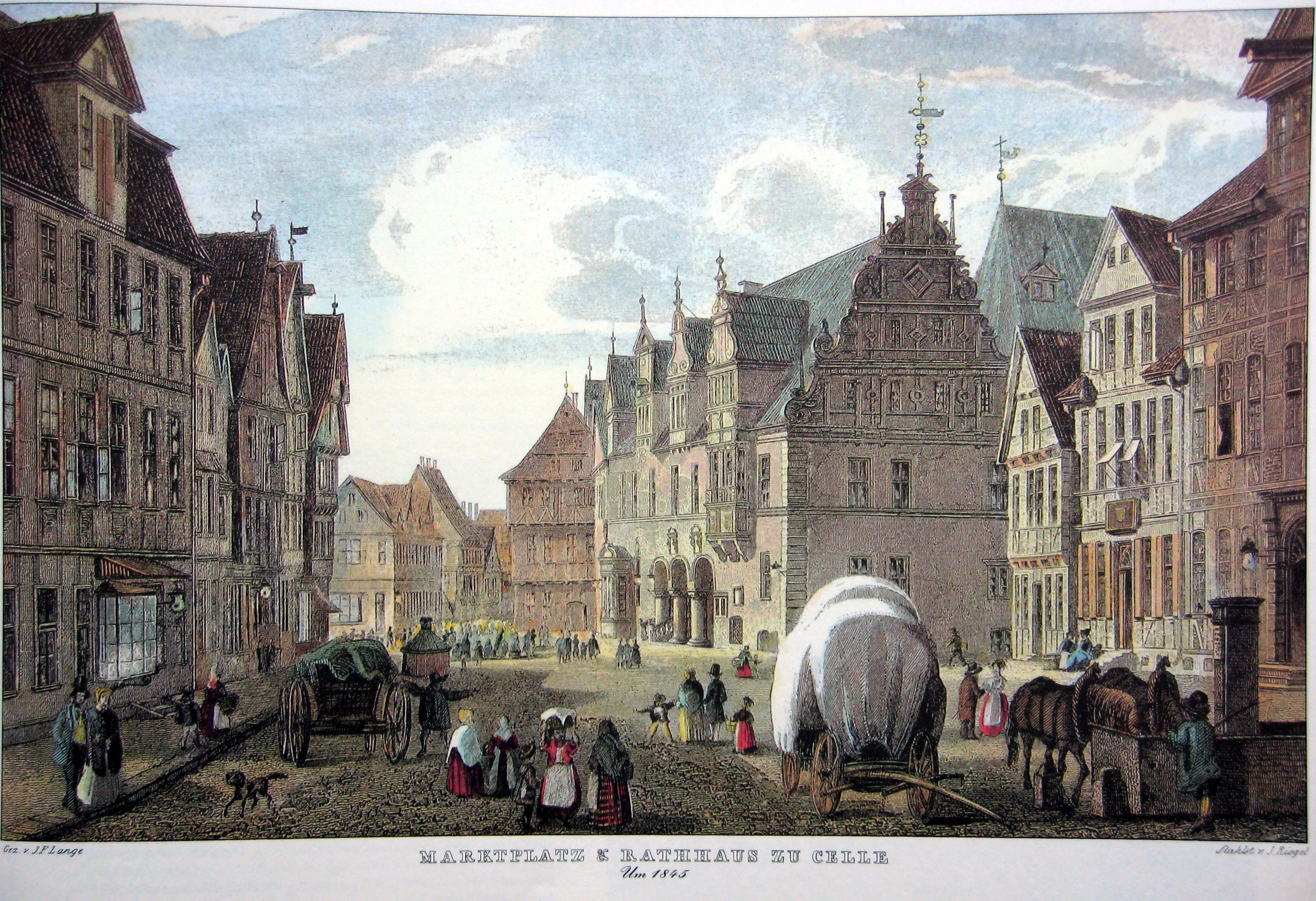
Steel engraving of the marketplace around 1845

In 1892 − with the help of numerous citizens' donations − the present-day Bomann Museum with its important folklore and town-history collections was founded. In 1913 the 74 metre high clock tower was built on the town church and its clockwork underwent a major restoration in 2008. In the 1920s the silk mill was built. It was merged in 1932 with the one in Peine to become the Seidenwerk Spinnhütte AG. This concern expanded during the Nazi era into an armaments centre under the name of Seidenwerk Spinnhütte AG. A subsidiary founded in 1936, the Mitteldeutsche Spinnhütte AG, led war preparations through its branches in the central German towns of Apolda, Plauen, Osterode, Pirna and Wanfried. Its only product was the parachute silk needed for the paratroopers of the Wehrmacht.

During World War I, Germany operated two prisoner-of-war camps in Celle, and among its prisoners were British, Polish, Romanian, French, Belgian and Russian POWs and civilians. In 1916–1917, the Germans operated a special sub-sector for Polish POWs at one of the camps, with the aim of subjecting them to propaganda and conscripting them into a planned German-controlled Polish army to fight against Russia.

In September 1929 Rudolph Karstadt opened a Karstadt department store in Celle town centre, the façade of which was identical to that of the Karstadt store on Berlin's Hermannplatz. The Celle branch was demolished in the 1960s and replaced by a controversial new building, the aluminium-braced facade of which was meant to represent Celle's timber-framed houses.

=== Nazi era ===
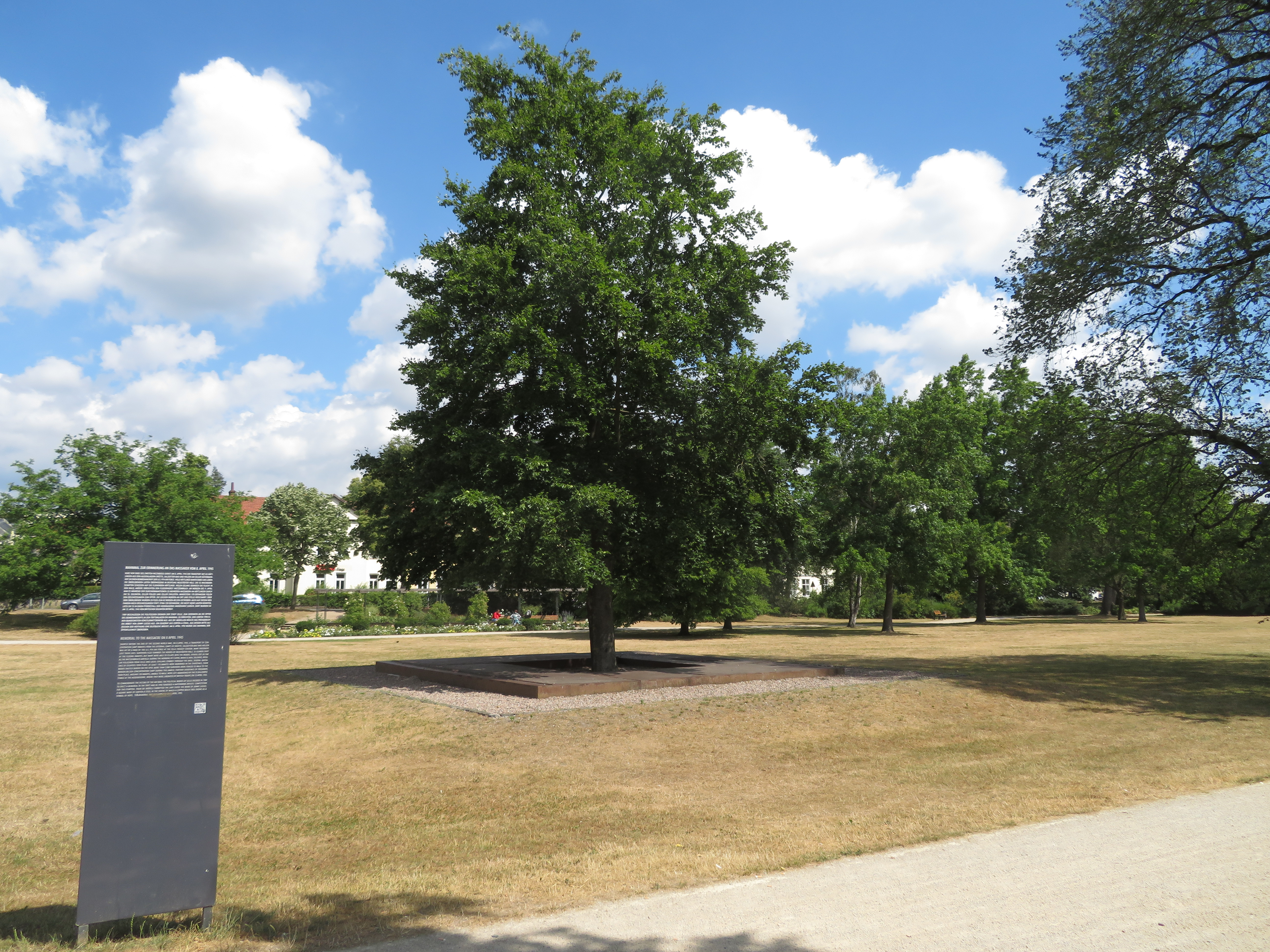
Memorial of Celler Hasenjagd

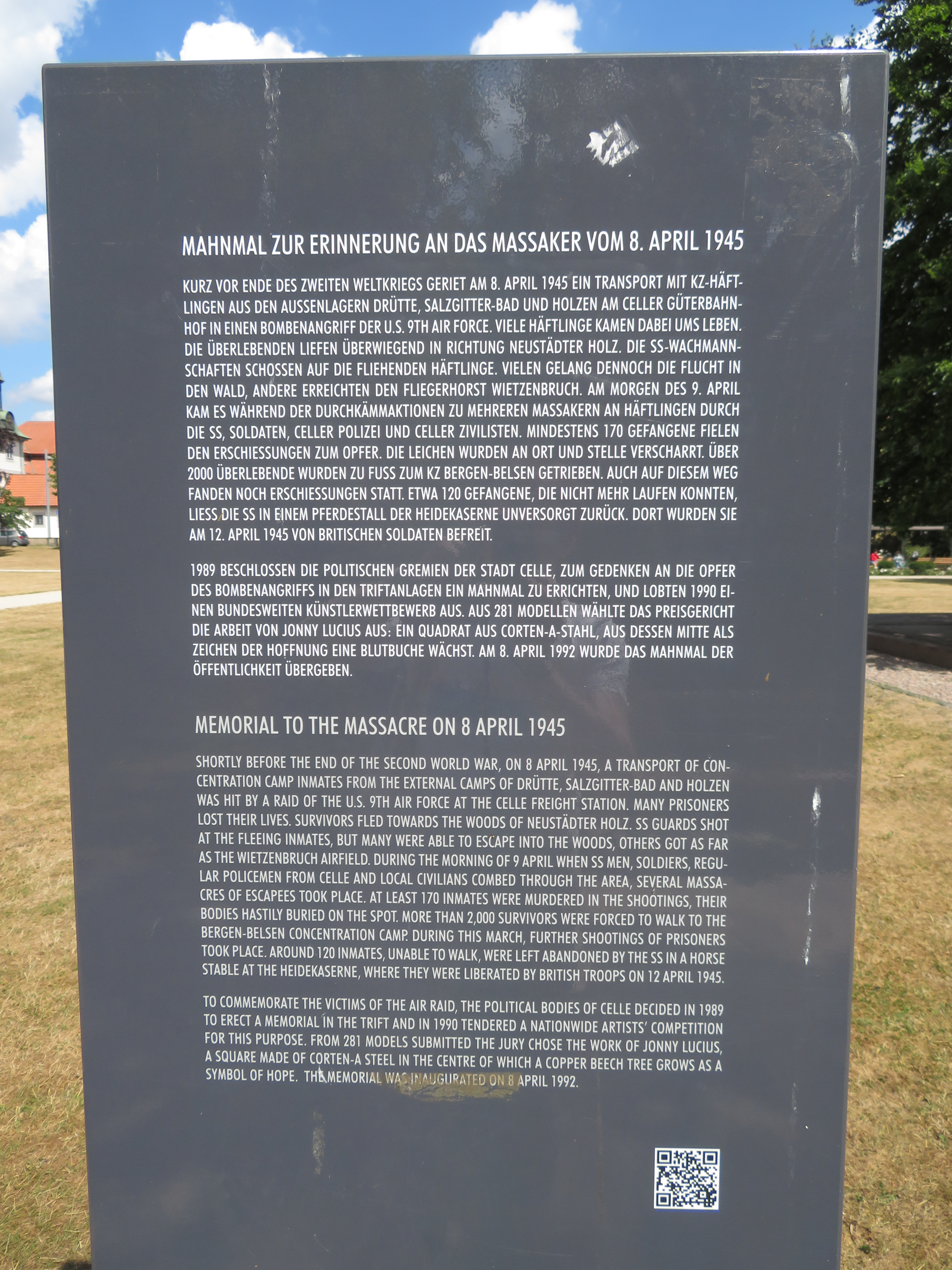
Information board at the memorial

During Kristallnacht, the anti-Jewish pogrom in Nazi Germany on 9/10 November 1938, the synagogue in Celle was saved from complete destruction only because it was in a very narrow lane and there would have been a risk to the adjacent leather factory and other parts of the historical city centre with its old wooden houses.

On 1 April 1939 Altenhäusen, Klein Hehlen, Neuenhäusen, Vorwerk and Wietzenbruch were incorporated into Celle. Towards the end of World War II, two serious Allied bombings occurred during the bombing of Celle: one on 22 February when the Celle railway station was attacked as a part of Operation Clarion and on 8 April 1945, when 2.2% of the town was destroyed, especially the industrial areas and railway freight terminal. A train in which about 4,000 prisoners were being transported to the nearby Bergen-Belsen concentration camp was hit. The attack claimed hundreds of casualties, but some of the prisoners managed to escape into the nearby woods. SS guards and Celle citizens participated in the so-called 'Celle hare hunt' (Celler Hasenjagd). The 'hunt' claimed several hundred dead and went on until 10 April 1945 and represented the darkest chapter in Celle's history. The exact number of victims has not been determined. Several of the perpetrators were later tried and convicted of this war crime. A memorial with an information board and a copper-beech tree was inaugurated in Triftanlagen park on 8 April 1992. The German word for copper-beech is Blutbuche, meaning blood beech.

About 2.2% of Celle (67 houses) was destroyed in the Second World War. 550 houses were heavily damaged and 614 were slightly damaged. Celle was spared from further destruction by surrendering without a fight to advancing allied troops on 12 April 1945, so that the historical city centre and the castle survived the war completely unscathed.

=== Military ===
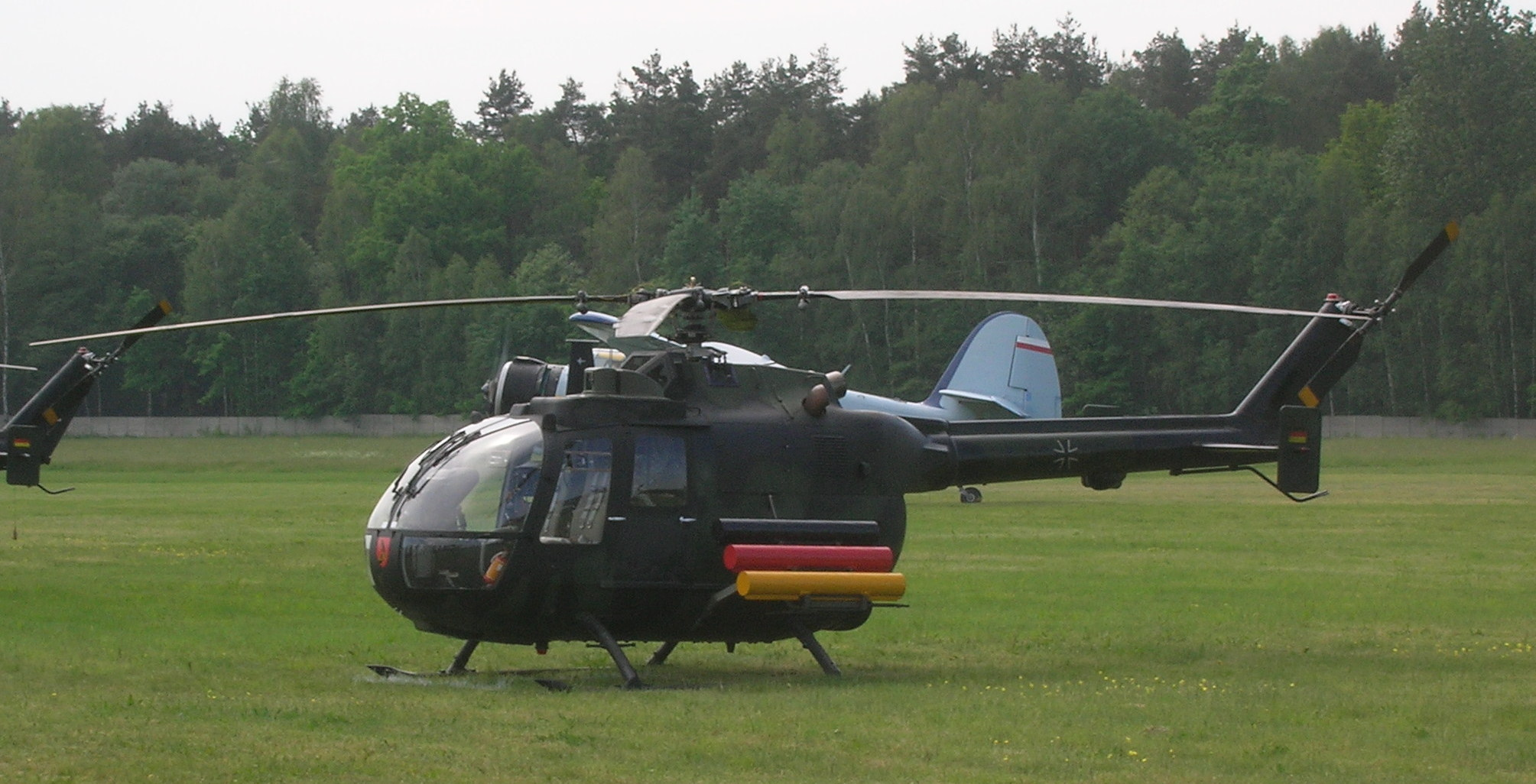
German Army Anti-tank helicopter Bölkow Bo 105 at Celle Air Base.

In Nazi Germany, Celle was an important garrison location. Elements of the 17th and 73rd Infantry Regiments and the 19th Artillery Regiment were garrisoned in the town. Celle was also the headquarters of a military district command and a military records office.

The different German Army barracks (including the Freiherr von Fritsch Barracks in Scheuen and the Cambridge Dragoons Barracks in the city) were used as sites for the German 33rd Armoured Brigade until the 1990s. The Celle Air Base (Immelmann Barracks) in the District of Wietzenbruch is now the site of the Training Centre of the Army Aviation School and the Cambridge Dragoons Barracks has now become a youth cultural centre (CD-Kaserne).

The British Army barracks, which as Celle Station formed part of Bergen-Hohne Garrison, were handed over to the German authorities on 5 November 2012. Since German reunification, Celle has largely lost its role as a major garrison town.

=== Post-war era ===
After the war Celle applied, along with Bonn and Frankfurt, to become the seat for the Parliamentary Council (Parlamentarischer Rat), the immediate post-war governmental body in Germany, later superseded by the West German Bundestag. In the end the privilege went to Bonn.

Trenchard Barracks in Celle was the most modern barracks in Germany during the war, with blackout blinds between the double-glazed windows and other features which became commonplace afterwards. The cellar doors were trial rooms for the number of inmates from Belsen who could be gassed. When Belsen concentration camp was liberated Trenchard Barracks was used as a hospital for surviving inmates who needed treatment. Later it became the Barracks for the 1st Battalion of the British Army's Rifle Brigade.

On 1 January 1973 Celle lost its status as an independent town (Kreisfreie Stadt) and became the largest municipality in the new district (Kreis) of Celle. It also became the largest town in the new region (Regierungsbezirk) of Lüneburg. At the same time the localities of Ummern, Pollhöfen and Hahnenhorn were incorporated into Gifhorn district. Since then the parish of Hohne has looked after six villages (Hohne, Helmerkamp, Spechtshorn, Ummern, Pollhöfen and Hahnenhorn) in two rural districts. The town of Celle has also incorporated a number of villages from the surrounding area.

On 25 July 1978 a staged bomb attack was made on the outer wall of the prison. This was initially blamed on the Red Army Faction, but was later revealed to have been perpetrated by Lower Saxony's intelligence service, the Verfassungsschutz. The incident became known as the Celle Hole.

In 2004 the region of Lüneburg was dissolved along with the rest of Lower Saxony's administrative districts. Celle is currently the twelfth largest town in Lower Saxony.

=== Incorporation of municipalities ===
- 1 April 1939: Altenhäusen, Klein Hehlen, Neuenhäusen, Vorwerk und Wietzenbruch
- 1 January 1973: Altencelle, Altenhagen, Alvern, Bostel, Boye, Burg, Garßen, Groß Hehlen, Hustedt, Lachtehausen, Scheuen and Westercelle.

=== Growth in population ===
In the Middle Ages and early modern period Celle only had a few thousand inhabitants. The population grew only slowly and dropped frequently as a result of many wars, epidemics and periods of famine. Not until the beginnings of industrialisation in the 19th century did population growth accelerate. It reached a total of 8,800 in 1818 but by 1900 this had more than doubled to 20,000. The incorporation of the surrounding villages on 1 April 1939 saw a further (artificial) rise in numbers to 38,000.

Shortly after the Second World War the many refugees and displaced persons from Eastern Europe led to a steep rise in the number of inhabitants within just a few months from around 17,000 to 55,000 by December 1945. The addition of new municipalities on 1 January 1973 saw an additional 18,691 people being included within the borough of Celle and bringing the total population to 75,178 − its historical high point. On 30 June 2005 the official number of inhabitants within Celle borough, according to an update by the Lower Saxony State Department of Statistics, was 71,402 (only main residences, and after adjustments with the other state departments).

The following overview shows the population numbers based on the 'catchment area' at the time. The 1818 figure is an estimate, the rest are based on census results(¹) or official updates by the Department of Statistics. From 1871 the returns show the population actually present, from 1925 the resident population and since 1987 the population residing at their main residence. Before 1871 the numbers are based on various, different census-gathering processes.

Year	Population
1818	8,800
3 December 1855 ¹	13,117
3 December 1861 ¹	14,100
3 December 1864 ¹	14,900
3 December 1867 ¹	16,200
1 December 1871 ¹	16,147
1 December 1875 ¹	18,200
1 December 1880 ¹	18,800
1 December 1885 ¹	18,800
1 December 1890 ¹	18,901
2 December 1895 ¹	19,438

Year	Population
1 December 1900 ¹	19,883
1 December 1905 ¹	21,390
1 December 1910 ¹	23,263
1 December 1916 ¹	20,521
5 December 1917 ¹	19,997
8 October 1919 ¹	23,589
16 June 1925 ¹	25,456
16 June 1933 ¹	27,734
17 May 1939 ¹	37,799
31 December 1945	55,059
29 October 1946 ¹	52,281

Year	Population
13 September 1950 ¹	59,667
25 September 1956 ¹	57,239
6 June 1961 ¹	58,506
31 December 1965	58,766
27 May 1970 ¹	57,155
31 December 1975	74,347
31 December 1980	72,820
31 December 1985	70,482
25 May 1987 ¹	71,222
31 December 1990	72,260
31 December 1995	73,936

Year	Population
31 December 2000	72,127
30 June 2005	71,402
1 January 2006	71,371
1 January 2008	70,850
31 December 2011	69,972
31 December 2014	68,721
31 December 2017	69,706

¹ Census results

== Government ==
For the purposes of Bundestag elections the town of Celle belongs to the constituency of Celle-Uelzen. In 1983, 1987, 1990 and 1994 Klaus-Jürgen Hedrich (CDU) won the direct vote. In 1998, 2002 and 2005 Peter Struck (SPD) won the majority of votes. In 2009 Henning Otte (CDU) received the direct mandate.

For Lower Saxony State Parliament (Landtag) elections Celle forms the constituency of Celle-Stadt with its surrounding area. In 2003 the CDU won the majority of votes.

=== Town council ===
The town council has 42 elected members as well as the directly elected mayor (Oberbürgermeister). Since the local elections of 11 September 2016, it has consisted of ten parties or voting groups:

- CDU − 16 seats
- SPD − 9 seats
- AfD - 4 seats
- Bündnis 90/Die Grünen − 3 seats
- Zukunft Celle − 3 seats
- FDP − 2 seats
- Die Linke/Alliance for Social Justice (Bündnis Soziale Gerechtigkeit) – Celle (BSG-CE) − 2 seats
- Die Unabhängigen - 2 seats
- Die Partei - 1 seat
- WG (Wählergemeinschaft) − 1 seat

=== Mayors (Oberbürgermeister) ===
- 1877–1895: Otto Hattendorf (1822–1905)
- 1895–1924: Wilhelm Denicke
- 1924–1945: Ernst Meyer (1887–1948)
- 1945: Max Vogel
- 1945–1946: Walther Hörstmann (1898–1977)
- 1946–1948: Richard Schäfer
- 1948–1952: Franz-Georg Guizetti
- 1952–1964: Wilhelm Heinichen (1883–1967)
- 1964–1973: Kurt Blanke (1900–1997)
- 1973–1985: Helmuth Hörstmann (1909–1993)
- 1986–2001: Herbert Severin
- 2001–2008: Martin Biermann (CDU)
- 2009–2017: Dirk-Ulrich Mende (SPD)
- since 2017: Jörg Nigge (CDU)

=== Coat of arms ===
The armorial achievement of the town of Celle

Blazoning: Azure, a castle, triple-towered, embattled above the port, all argent, masoned sable, the port sable, the towers roofed gules. The port charged with a lion rampant azure surrounded by seven hearts gules on an inescutcheon bendwise or.

The helmet on the full coat of arms is described as follows: On the shield is a blue and white wreathed helmet with a mantling, blue on the outside and white on the inside. The crest consists of two sickles leaning outwards with red handles. The sickles have their points upwards, blades inward-facing and are decorated with peacock's eyes on the outside edges.

=== Flag ===
The town flag is divided into two equal stripes in the town colours of blue and white. It may also contain the town coat of arms.

=== Official seal ===
The town of Celle has an official seal whose design is based on the oldest town seal of 1288 with the circumscription Stadt Celle. It depicts a gatehouse between two castle towers. In the open gateway under a decorative helmet there is a shield tilting to the left charged with the lion of the Dukes of Lüneburg.

== Twin towns – sister cities ==
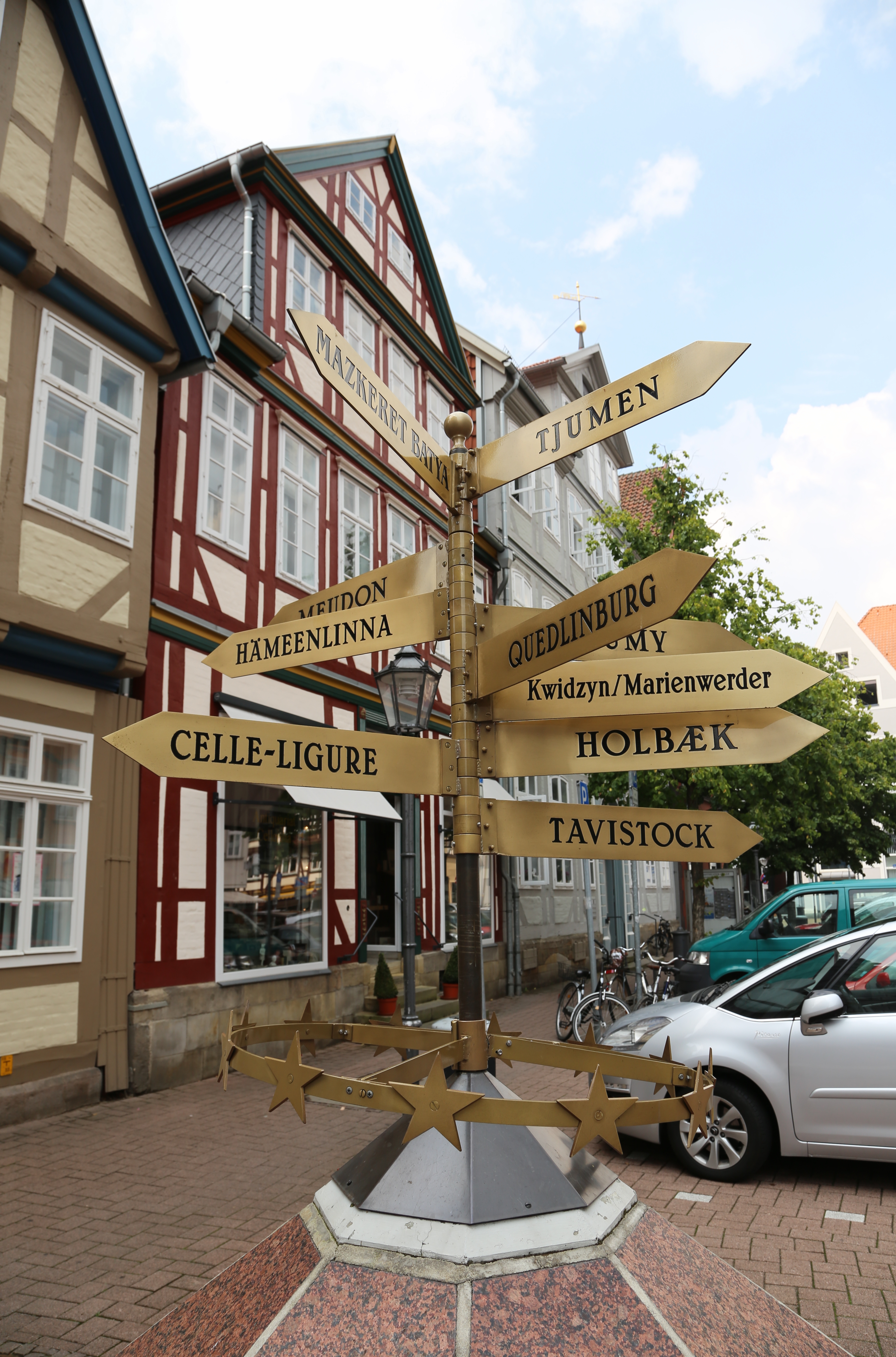
Signpost of twin towns of Celle

Celle is twinned with:

- Celle Ligure, Italy
- Hämeenlinna, Finland
- Holbæk, Denmark
- Kwidzyn, Poland
- Meudon, France
- Mazkeret Batya, Israel
- Sumy, Ukraine
- Tavistock, England, United Kingdom
- Tulsa, United States
- Tyumen, Russia (resting)

== Main sights ==
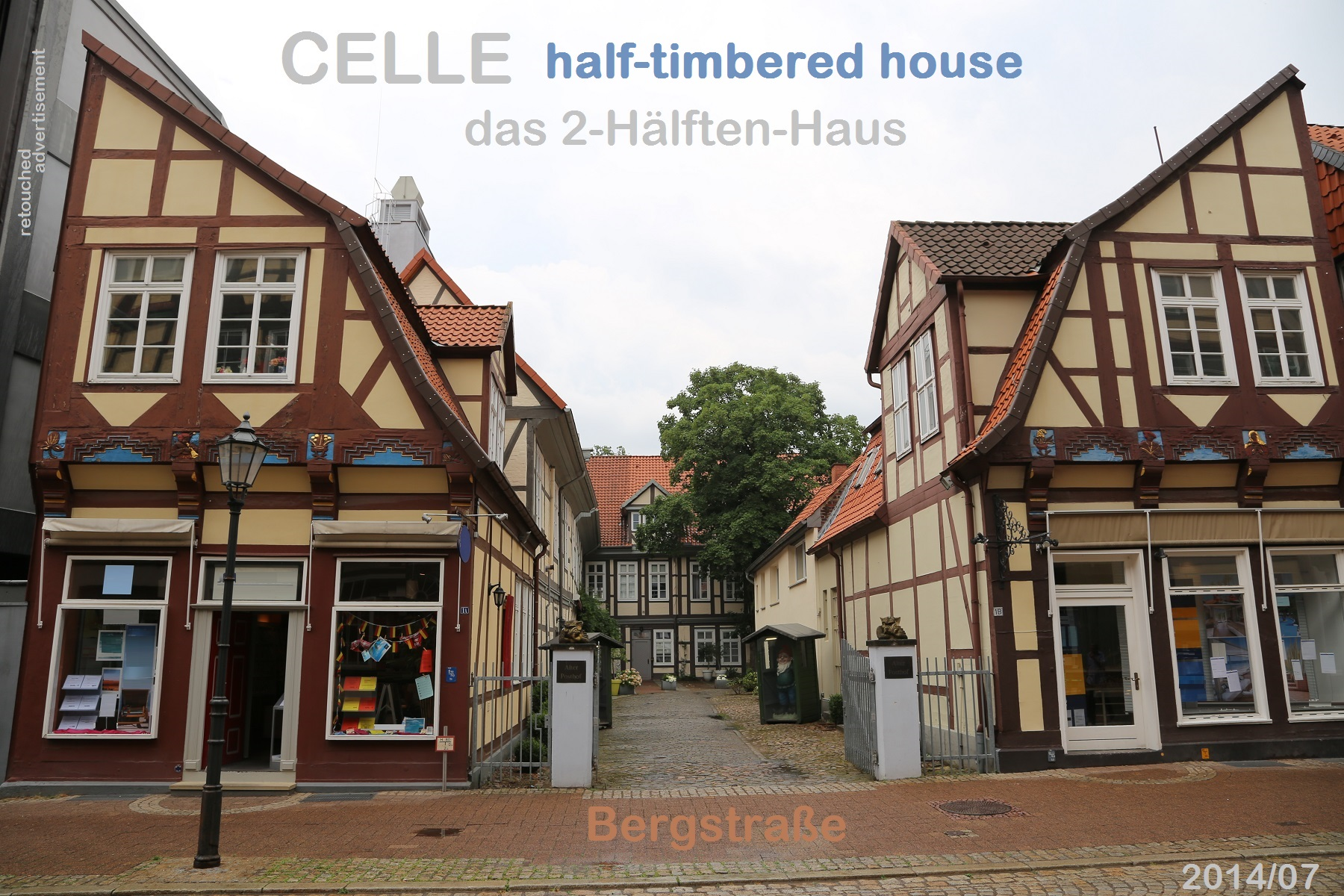
Half-timbered house (Bergstr.) with incorrectly replaced halves

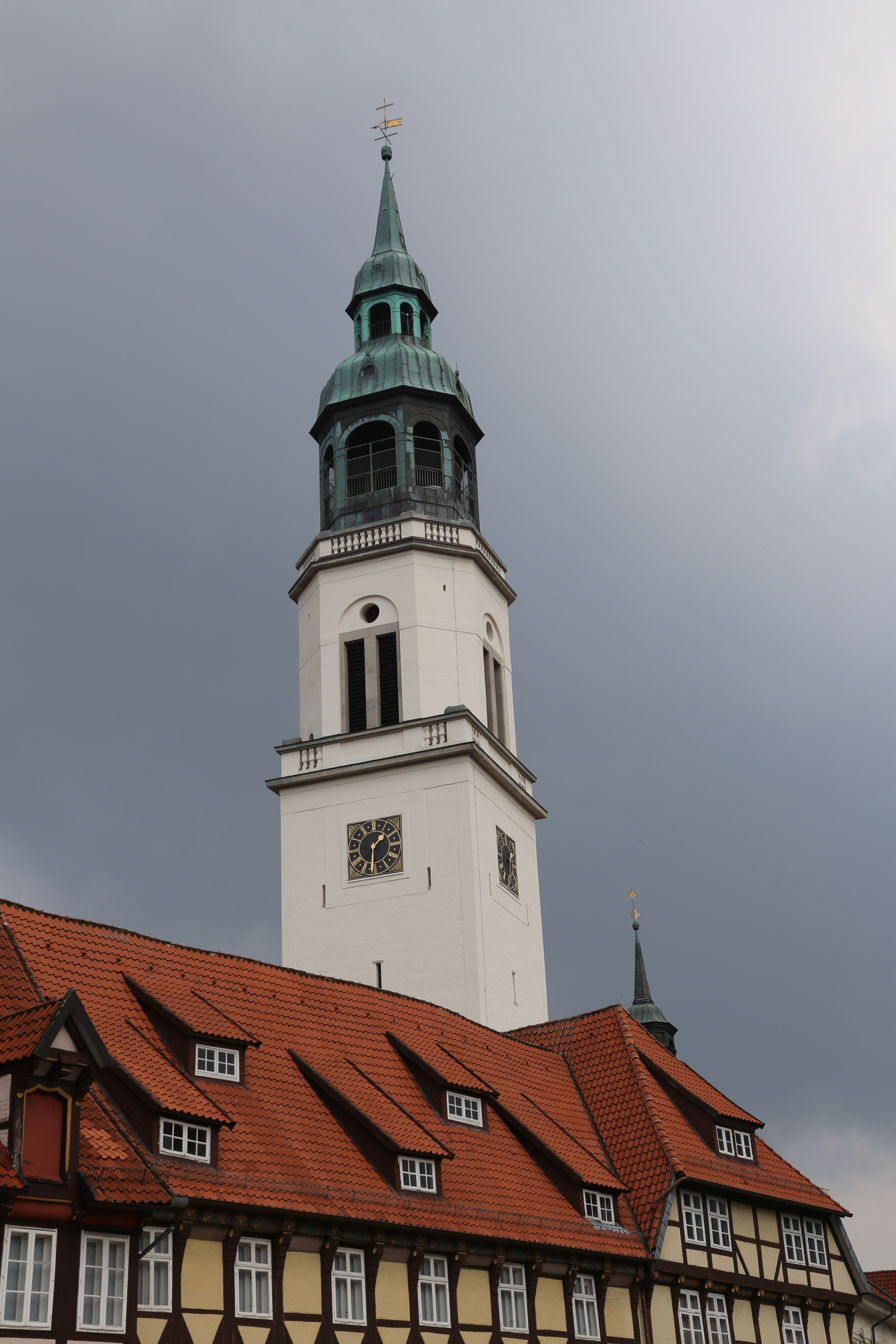
Church St.Marien with its white steeple

The buildings in Celle's old town centre date back to the 16th century, among them numerous (and some 480 restored) half-timber houses with wood carvings, making Celle an important city for tourism in the southern Lüneburg Heath region. One of the most famous houses is Hoppenerhaus dating from 1532. The Old Latin School was built in 1602. The most impressive building in Celle is the ducal palace, Schloss Celle, which was built in 1530 in a well-kept park at the site of the former castle. It was enlarged in a baroque style in the 17th century, and a renaissance chapel and a special theatre which is the oldest theatre in Germany were added in 1674. The Old City Hall which is famous for its sandstone carvings was built 1561–1579 in a Renaissance style. Another major attraction is the Stadtkirche (town church) with its white tower, from where the town trumpeter blows a fanfare twice a day (an old tradition that was revived as a tourist attraction). Originally it was a small gothic chapel built in 1380, but it was enlarged from 1675 to 1698 and transformed into a baroque church with impressive stucco ornaments.

Hugenottenstrasse is a historical street with well-preserved wooden houses built at the beginning of the 18th century. It was the main street of a residential area specially laid out for French Huguenots who sought refuge in Celle because of the Persecution of Huguenots under Louis XV in the 17th century. The oldest house dates from 1693. On the corner of Emigrantenstraße, another historical street which was laid out for Austrian refugees at the beginning of the 18th century, Neuhäuser Kirche, a Lutheran church was founded in 1710. It was enlarged from 1852 to 1866. Its steeple dates from the same period.

Even a large prison (Justizvollzugsanstalt, JVA) was built in a baroque style in the west of the city centre from 1710 to 1731. It was the only historical building of Celle which was damaged during the air raid on 8 April 1945. It was repaired after the war. Sometimes tourists walking from the railway station to the centre mistake it for a castle because of its typical baroque architecture.

Celle has a synagogue built in 1740, one of the few that survived the Nazi pogrom night of 1938, thanks to its location in a narrow street of wooden half-timber houses next to an important leather factory that would have been collaterally damaged.

The Albrecht Thaer School, a school in Celle, was founded by Albrecht Daniel Thaer in 1796.

=== Museums ===
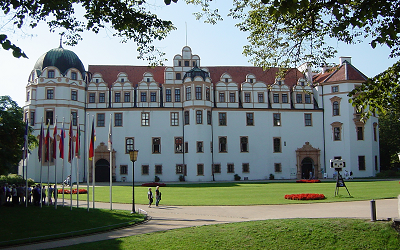
Celle Castle

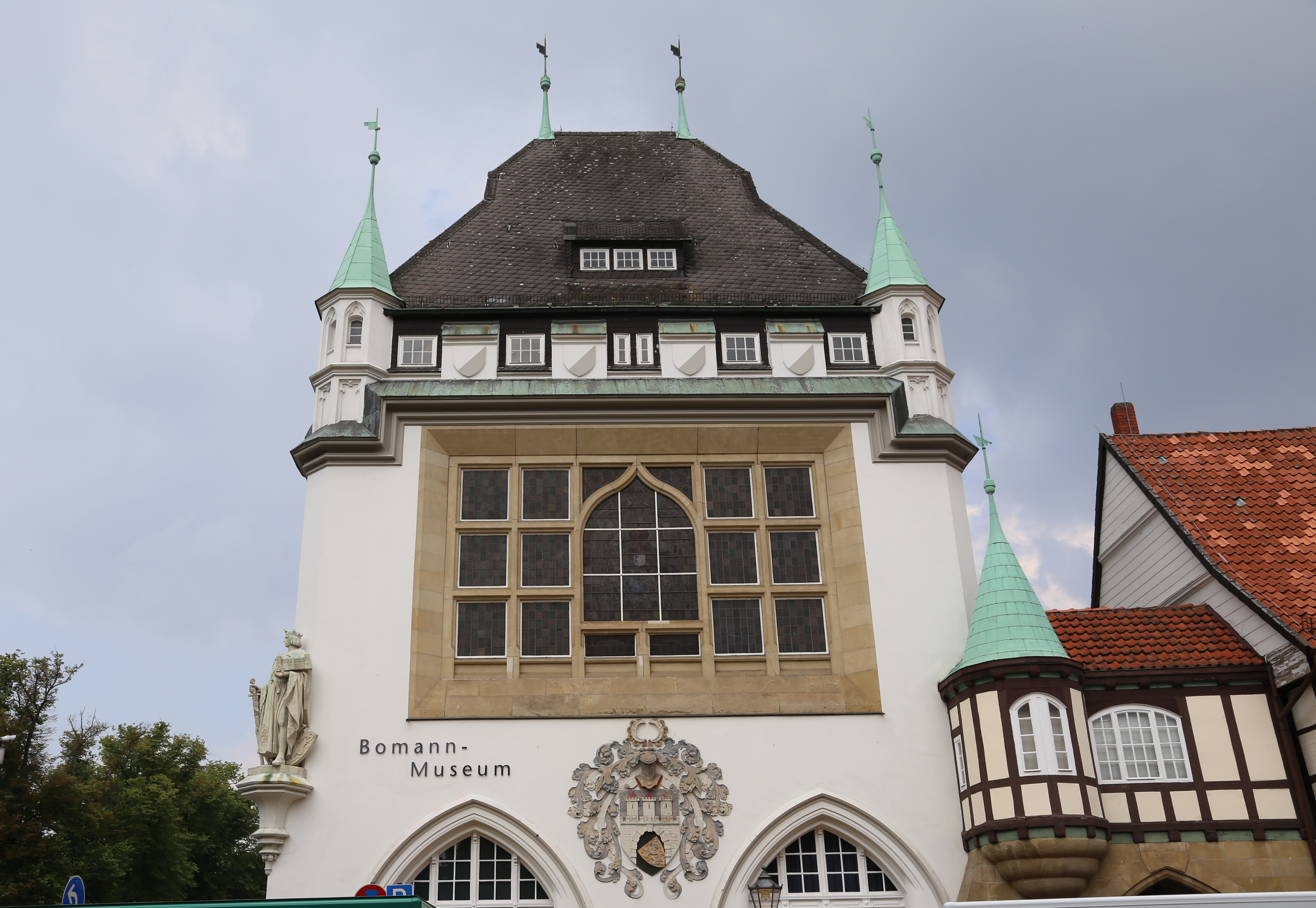
Bomann-Museum near castle with coat of arms

The Bomann Museum opposite the castle has works by the artist Eberhard Schlotter and has exhibitions of local folklore and town history. It houses the Tansey Collection, a collection of portrait miniatures. The Celle Art Museum (Kunstmuseum Celle) with its Robert Simon collection is affiliated with the Bomann Museum.

In the castle itself is the Residenz Museum, which makes use of its premises and an exhibition to document the princely House of Welf. The Garrison Museum deals with the history of Celle Garrison from 1866 to the present day, whilst the Shooting Museum (Schützenmuseum) in Haus der Stadtmauer is devoted to Celle's shooting club history. The work of Celle's Neues Bauen architect, Otto Haesler, is charted by the Haesler Museum. And in the old storage barn (Treppenspeicher) built in 1607, as well as the orangery, built in 1677 for the Institute of Apiculture, an exhibition of beekeeping may be viewed.

=== Theatre ===
The Schlosstheater Celle was founded in 1674 and is the oldest, still working theatre in Germany and the oldest baroque theatre in Europe. It has a main auditorium and two smaller stages (Malersaal and Turmbühne) as well as an additional external venue (Halle 19). Located at the edge of the old town (Altstadt) is the performing arts theatre Kunst & Bühne which is supported by the town and whose repertoire ranges from comedy to songs, jazz, cabaret and films.

=== Parks ===
The picturesque French Garden lies immediately south of the Altstadt and is where the Lower Saxon Institute of Apiculture may be found. The Castle Park, with its moats, is on the site of the former defensive fortifications of the ducal castle. Along Bahnhofstraße there is an area of common pasture used as a public park and play area (Triftanlagen). On the right bank of the Aller are the Dammasch Meadows, a popular destination for trips and recreation, and immediately next to them is the garden of medicinal plants and the Thaers Garden with its little manor house. By the New Town Hall (Neues Rathaus) is the recently laid-out town park. Other important open areas include the various town cemeteries, such as the picturesque forest cemetery, the Waldfriedhof, with its nature garden.

=== Image gallery ===
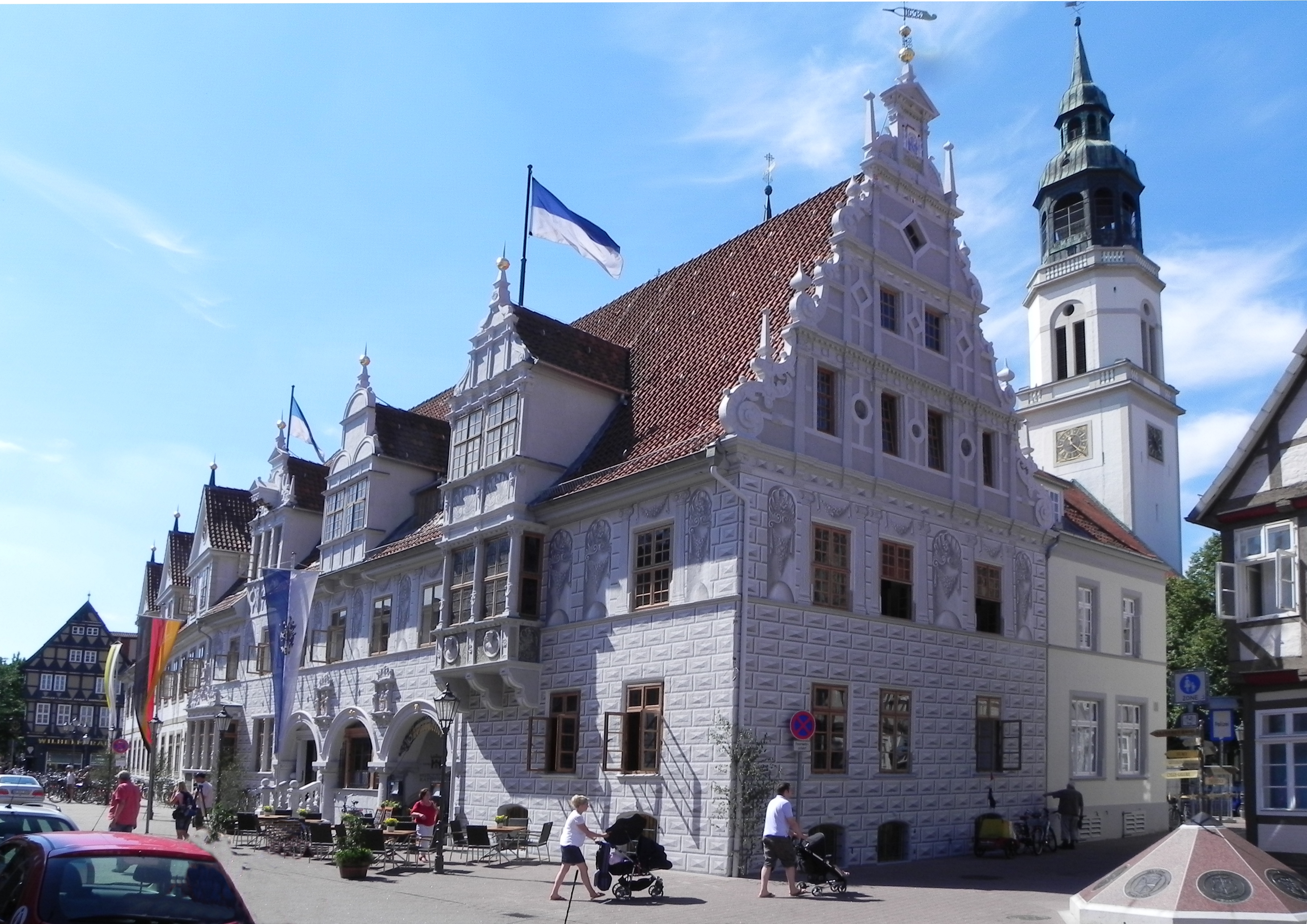
Old City Hall

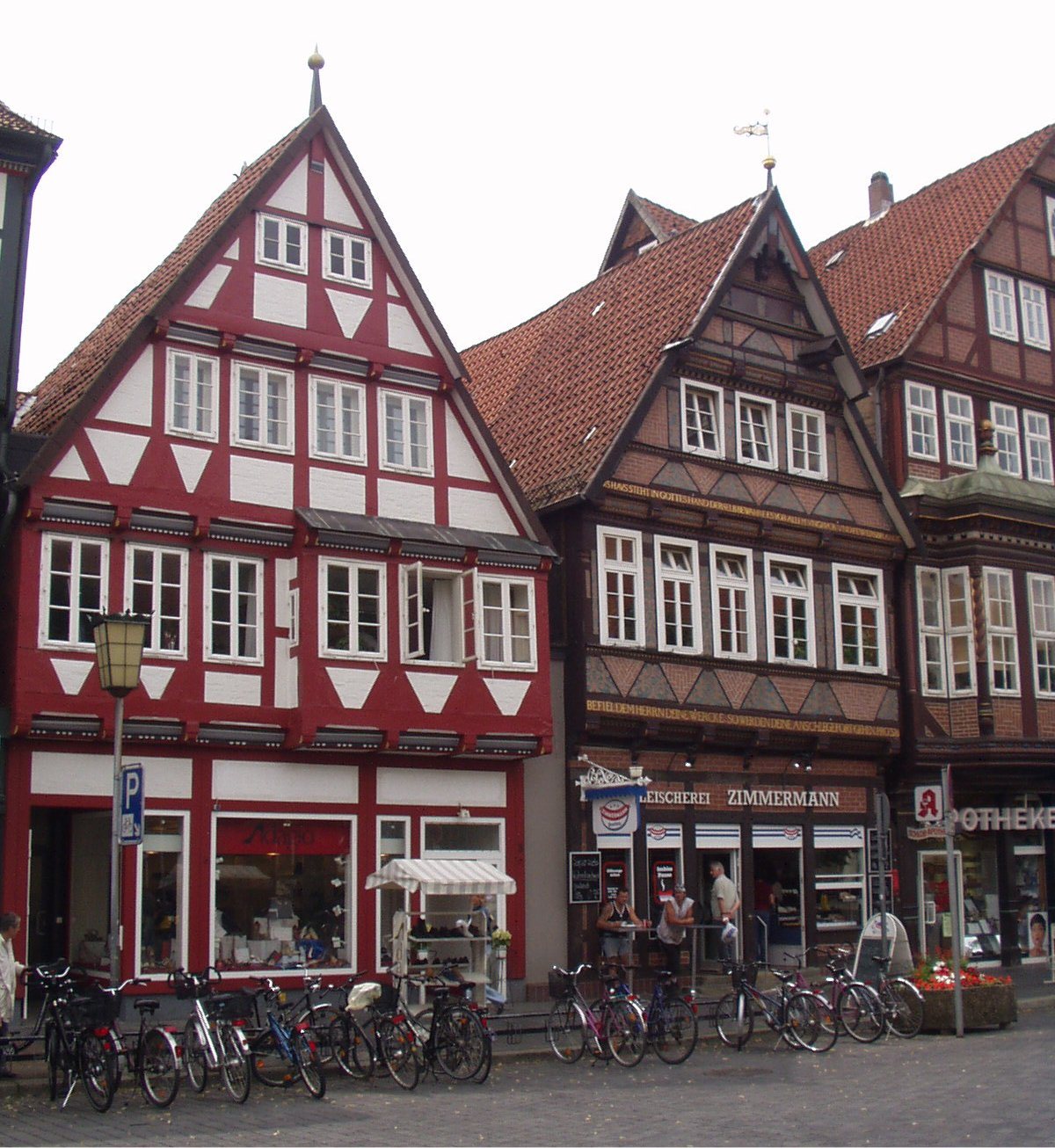
Houses in the Altstadt

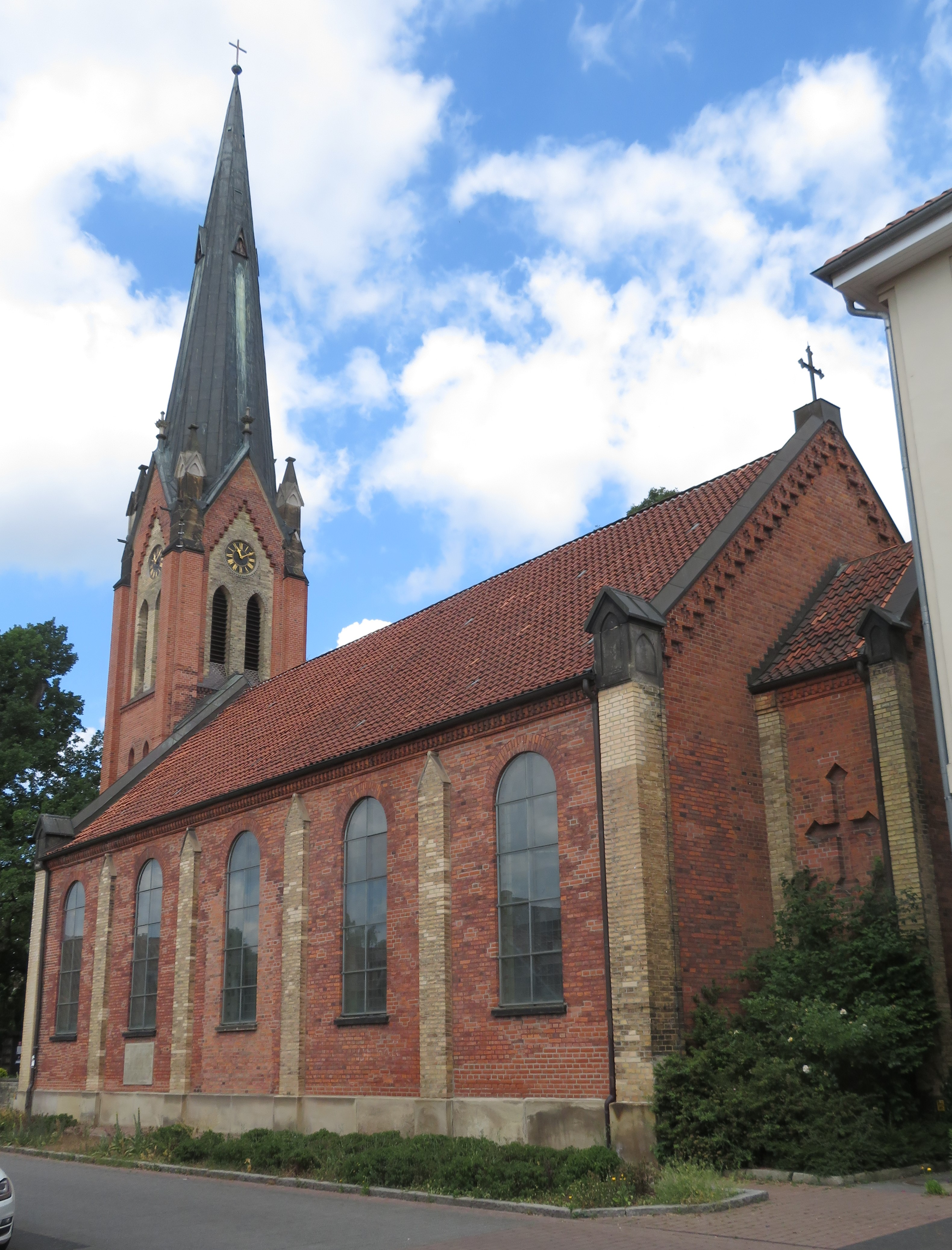
Neuenhäuser Kirche

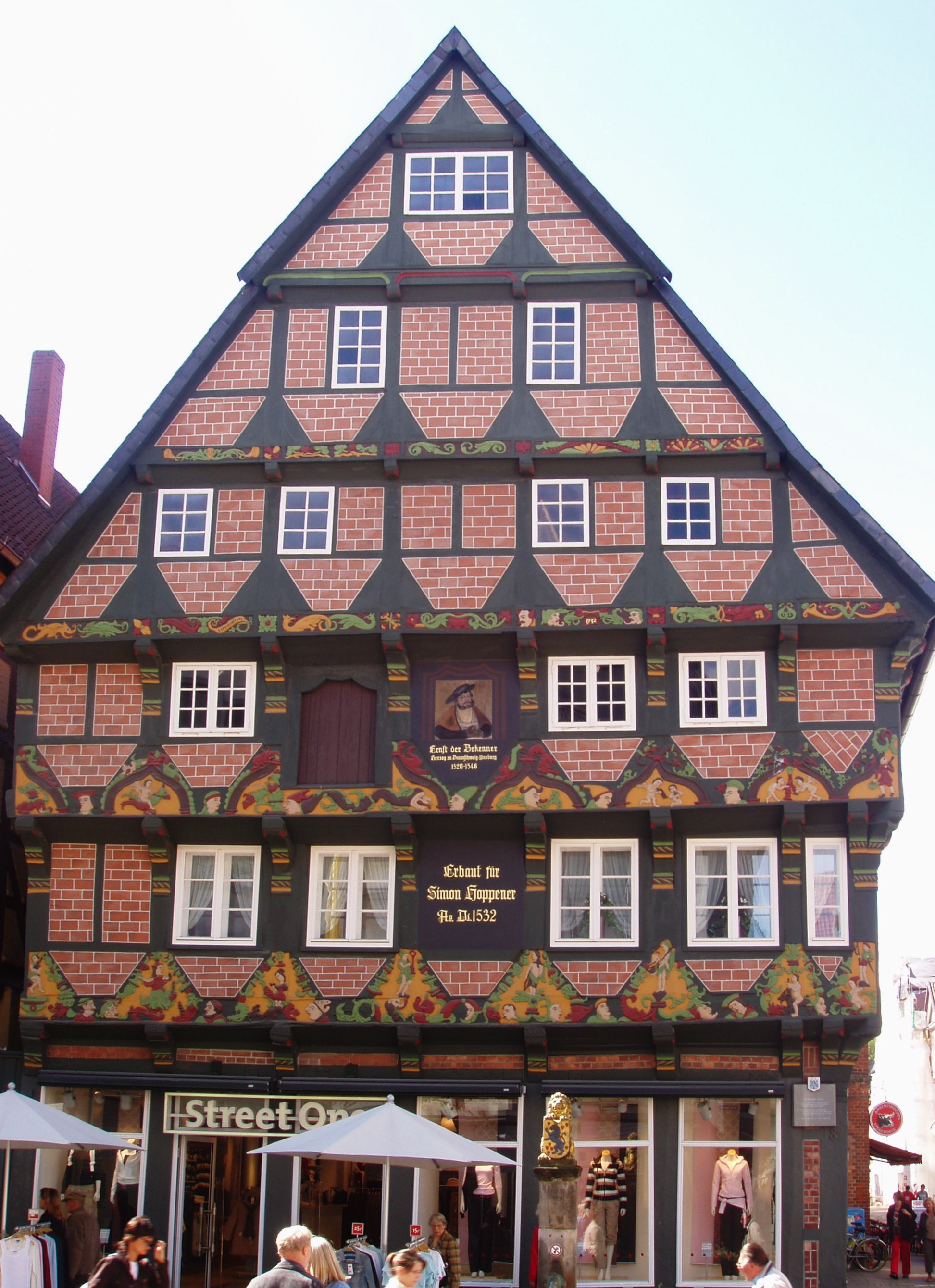
Hoppener Haus, the most famous and attractive timber-framed house in Celle's Altstadt

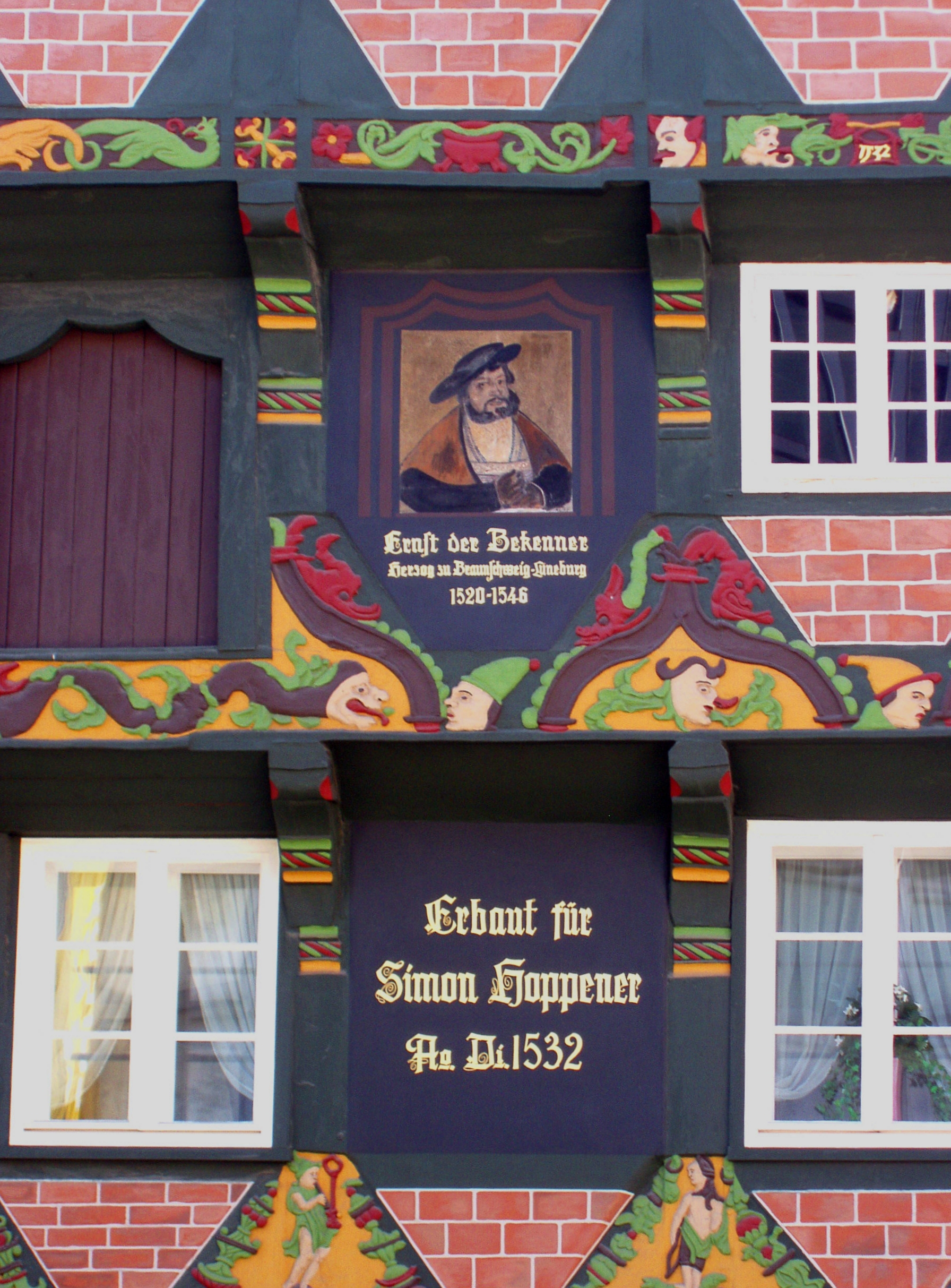
Portrait of Ernest the Confessor on the Hoppener Haus in Celle

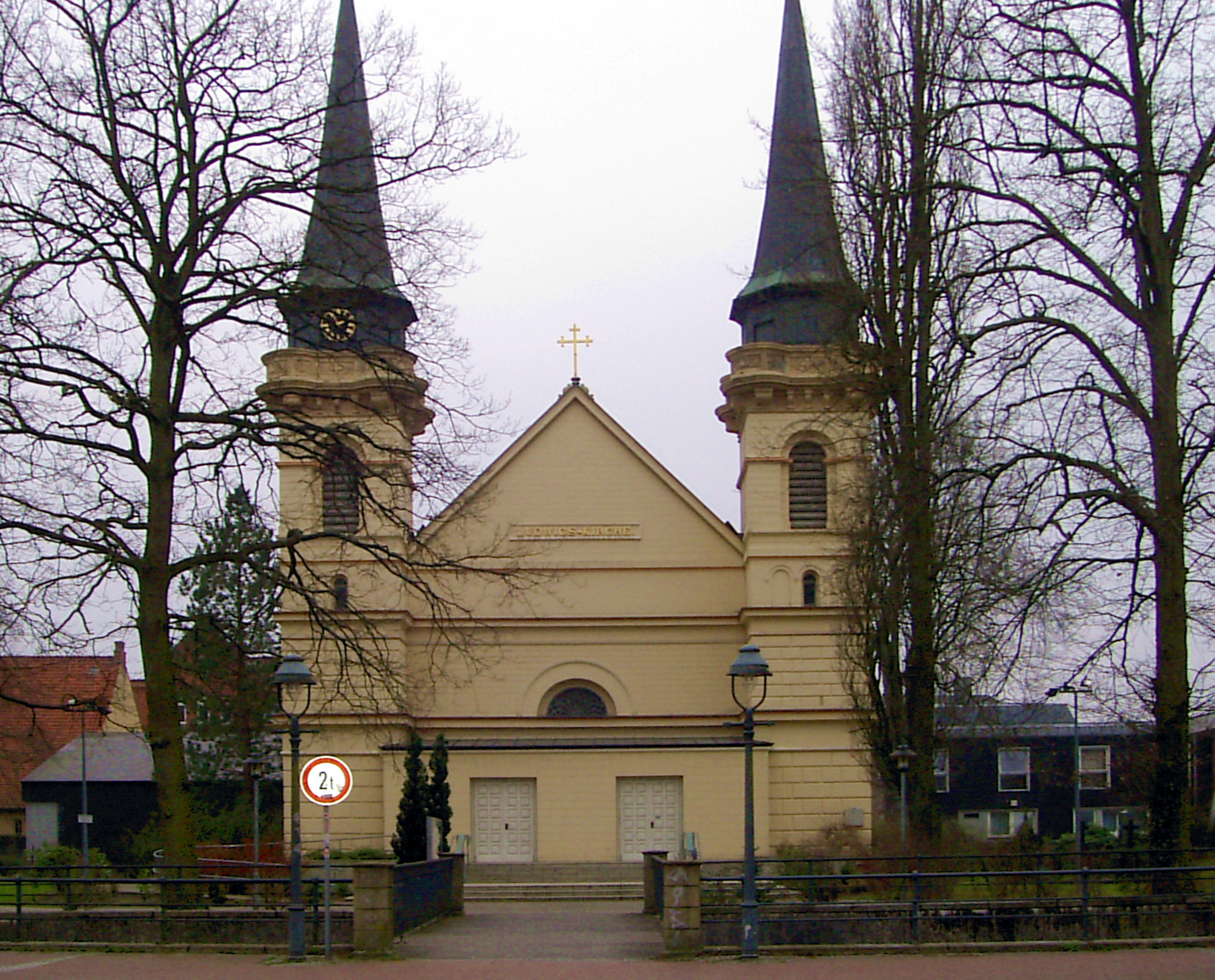
St Ludwig's, the Catholic Church of Celle

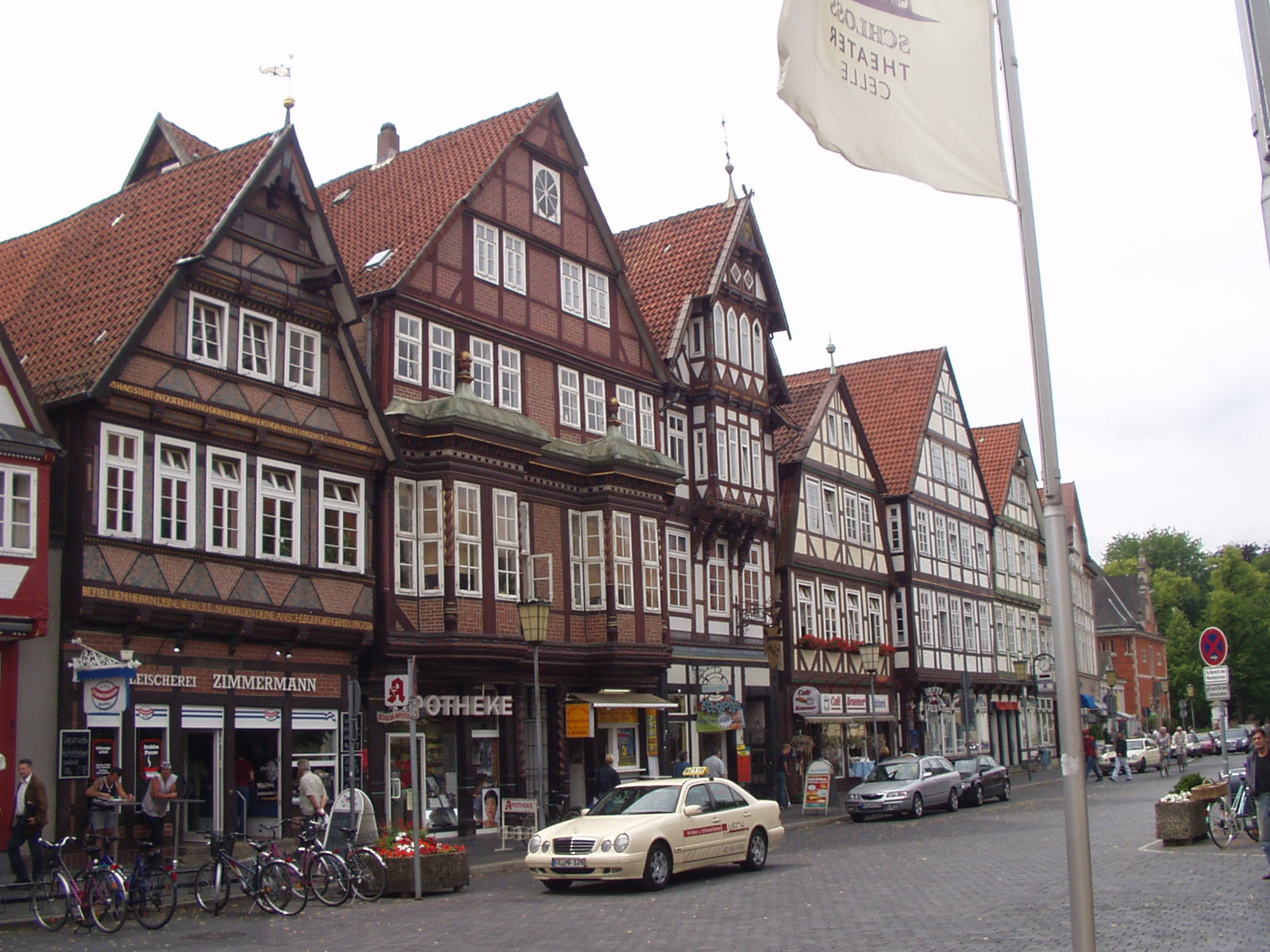
A half-timber house-lined street in Celle

== Events ==
The Congress Union Celle is an event centre for conferences and exhibitions as well as stage, music and festive events.

The CD-Kaserne ("Cambridge Dragoons (CD) Barracks") is a municipal youth and cultural centre with exhibition rooms covering the subject areas of music, film, art and society. Also located there is the Bunte Haus which is a charitable cultural centre. It focuses on projects and events dealing with social questions covering aspects of culture, social work and civic education. Its workers are volunteers. Celle also hosts a Christmas market every year in the old town centre.

== Sports ==
The Celler Oilers are an ice hockey team that play in the Regionalliga or regional league. From 1968 to the mid-1970s Celle's football club, TuS Celle, played in the German second division (then called the Regionalliga or "regional league"). After two bankruptcies and relegation, it was promoted to the Lower Saxony league for the 2004–2005 season and, since 2005 has played in the Northeast Lower Saxony league (Oberliga Niedersachsen Nordost), which is fifth tier of the German football league system.

The handball club, SV Garßen-Celle, has fielded a women's team that had played in the women's Second Division North since the mid-1990s. In 2009 it came first and was promoted to the First Division.

Since 1983 the Celle Wasa Run (Celler Wasa-Lauf) has taken place every year on the second Sunday of March in Celle's town centre. This has become one of the biggest running events in Germany for distances less than a marathon and is divided into runs of several distances: a children's run of 2.5 km (1.6 mi) and runs of 5, 10, 15 and 20 km (12.4 mi) distance. For several years there has also been a hiking (Wandern) event over 11 km (7 mi) along the Aller as well as Walking and Nordic Walking events. 2004 saw a record number of participants with 11,232 men and women taking part. Celle is one of five centres for the Lower Saxony Rowing Club. The Celle Sprint Regatta takes place annually in October on the Upper Aller at the Ziegeninsel and is hosted by the Hermann Billung Celle, Celler Ruderverein and Ruderclub Ernestinum-Hölty Celle rowing clubs.

The Celle Triathlon always takes place in August. This was originally organised by the Celle branch of the German Alpine Club (Deutscher Alpenverein), but for several years has been run by SV Altencelle.

Since 2001 Celle has played host to the In-Line Skating and Handbike Marathon from Hanover to Celle. This is one of the biggest races of its kind in Germany. In 2007 the European Masters speed skating championship took place as part of this event.

Celle also hosted Angola's national football team during the 2006 Football World Cup.

== Economy and Infrastructure ==
=== Economy ===
Tourism is a large contributor to Celle's economy, especially in the summer months during jazz, wine, and other festivals, which attract thousands of visitors.

The town is not really known for heavy industry, but many businesses which have started up in Celle and some, such as Rosa Graf Cosmetics, have reached the world market. Celle does have some links to the oil industry, though, particularly firms engineering parts for drilling; notably Baker Hughes (INTEQ and Hughes Christensen divisions; oil and gas industry service companies specialising in MWD, Wireline, Drill-bits, Drilling Applications Engineering, etc.), Cameron (global provider of pressure control, processing, flow control and compression systems as well as project management and aftermarket services for the oil and gas and process industries), and ITAG (drilling contractors and manufacturing plant). Halliburton, founded in 1919, is one of the world's largest providers of products and services to the energy industry and has an office in Celle. There is also a school for advance drilling techniques.

Other light industries include electronics, food manufacture, and metal, wood and plastic processing. In addition there an ink manufacturer (formerly Hostmann-Steinberg now hubergroup), paper factory (Werner Achilles Glanzfolien-Kaschieranstalt) and musical instruments makers (including Moeck). Celle is also home to Germany's Bee institute which carries out scientific studies on the bee species as well as keeping its own bee hives.

Celle is also known as a town of civil servants, due to the large number of government officials and lawyers who work there providing important administrative and judicial services to the region. Agriculture and forestry also play a role.

==== Foodstuffs ====
Celle is the base for a crispbread factory, Barilla Wasa Deutschland. Regional and to some extent national suppliers are the high-alcohol drink manufactures of the Ratzeputz and Alter Provisor brands. Originally made in Celle's Altstadt, the herb-based spirit Ratzeputz is now distilled on the Westercelle industrial estate, Alter Provisor is still produced and sold in the Altstadt. Celler Bier is also established here with its six varieties of beer. Another Celle speciality is Rohe Roulade, which initially gained fame in the Gasthaus Krohne (now Dackel's Krohne) in the district of Blumlage and is now offered in many of Celle's restaurants and pubs.

==== Transport and logistics ====
The East Hanoverian Railways (Osthannoversche Eisenbahnen or OHE) is a goods and passenger transport company covering the north German area with its headquarters in Celle. Also based in Celle are the postal distribution centre for Deutsche Post's post code district 29 and the transport company DTLS – Drilling Tools Logistic & Service.

=== Transport ===
==== Rail ====
Celle lies on the Hanover – Celle – Uelzen – Lüneburg – Hamburg line. Intercity (IC) trains to Hanover and Hamburg stop hourly at the station as do individual ICE trains during the rush hour. metronom trains link Celle to Uelzen, Hanover and Göttingen as part of the regional transport network. Celle is the terminus for routes S 6 and S 7 of the Hanover S-Bahn.

The section between Celle and Großburgwedel was built in the 1920s as a high-speed line for testing and record journeys across the heath-like, so-called Wietzenbruch. It was nicknamed the Hare Railway (Hasenbahn) due to its environment which was devoid of habitation and the numerous hares killed on the line in its early days. In 1965 this section via Langenhagen was electrified for the TEE and IC services from Hamburg to Hanover, in order to save routing them via Lehrte and having to change direction in Hanover. Later it was upgraded for traffic operating regularly at 200 km/h (124 mph). Formerly there were railway links from Celle via Schwarmstedt to Bremen (Aller Valley Railway) and via Plockhorst to Brunswick; these were closed in the 1970s and have largely been dismantled. In 2004 the last remaining branch line from Gifhorn to Celle via Wienhausen, that was still used in places for goods traffic, was finally closed and work on lifting the line in the area of the town has begun.

The East Hanoverian Railways run goods trains on several branch lines in the Celle area, including those to Wittingen, Soltau and Munster. Occasionally heritage trains and specials also run on these lines.

The Lehrte–Celle railway is an important route for goods trains and was converted in 1998 into a modern S-Bahn line.

A tramway network of 2 lines had been operated since 1907 by the Celler Straßenbahn but this was closed and dismantled between 1954 and 1956.

==== Road ====
Important links are:

- North-south: the B 3 running north to Soltau/Hamburg and south to Hanover
- Southeast-west: the B 214 running southeast to Brunswick and west to Nienburg
- Northeast: the B 191 to Uelzen/Lüneburg/Ludwigslust
- Landesstraße 310 via Fuhrberg southwest to the junction at Mellendorf on the A 7 motorway
- Landesstraße 282 east-northeast via Beedenbostel, Eldingen and Steinhorst to Wittingen
- Landesstraße 180 via Winsen (Aller) west-northwest to the motorway services of Raststätte Allertal, on the A 7

==== Air ====
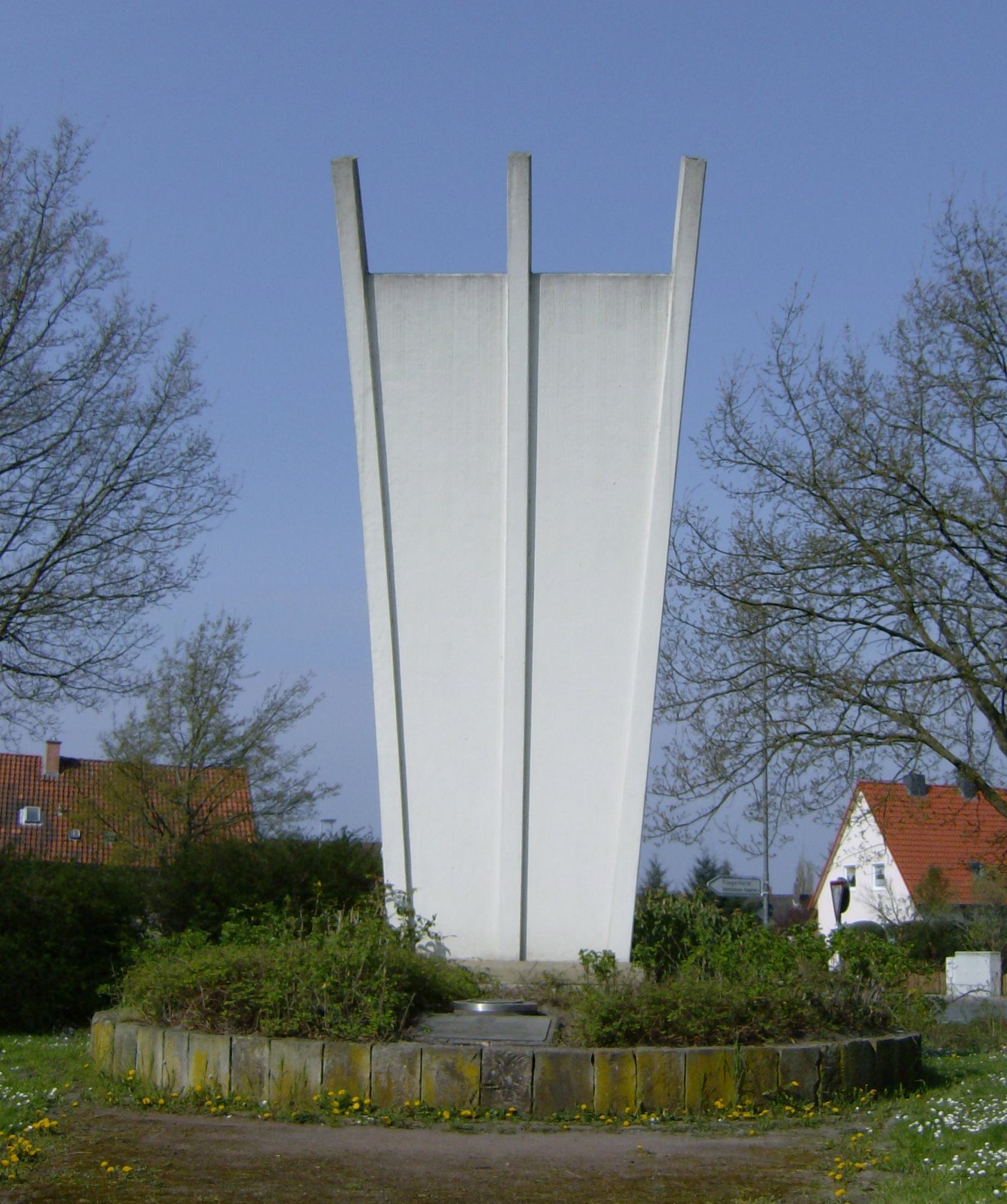
The Berlin Airlift memorial at Celle Air Base

Hanover-Langenhagen airport with international flight connections is about 35 kilometres (22 miles) away.

The Army airfield at Celle is 4.5 kilometres southwest of the town centre on the edge of the district of Wietzenbruch. Operated as RAF Celle after the Second World War, it was from here in 1948–49 that supply flights to Berlin took off as part of the Berlin Airlift. Today the airfield is mainly used by the Army Aviation School (Heeresfliegerwaffenschule) as a training airfield for helicopter pilots.
Celle-Arloh airfield near the district of Scheuen is a recreational airfield. It also offers round trips over the town of Celle and the Lüneburg Heath. There is also a glider airfield at Scheuen.

==== Water ====
Celle harbour is only used by tourists today. From Celle the Aller is classified downstream as a federal shipping lane; upstream a weir prevents ships passing. In former centuries Celle was an important transhipment station for ships between Brunswick and the ports in Bremen via Oker, Aller and the (Lower) Weser. Bremen and Brunswick merchants had specific tasks from the Dukes of Celle and later the town of Celle in order to ensure the safety of transport, because the speed of the Aller in the area of Celle made loading and unloading in the port necessary.

From 1900 the quantity of trade through Celle Harbour steadily decreased and switched to road and rail. Until 1970 the transport of grain to the Celle Rathsmühle and the transport of potash salts were still significant.

==== Town public transport services ====
The firm of CeBus runs eight bus lines around the town. There are 15 bus lines for regional services, with which the villages in the district of Celle can be reached. Sometimes town and region bus services are combined.

=== Media ===
The Cellesche Zeitung is the local daily newspaper with a circulation of 34,977 (as at: 2nd quarter 2005). In addition there is the bi-weekly Celler Kurier and weekly Celler Blitz as well as a monthly town magazine, the Celler Scene. Another monthly is the Celler Blickpunkt. The revista appears roughly every 2 months with a left-wing perspective of politics and culture.

=== Education ===
==== Schools ====
The grammar schools (Gymnasien) in Celle are the Hermann Billung Gymnasium which majors in mathematics, the sciences, Spanish and bilingual education (history to level 7 in English), the Kaiserin Auguste Viktoria Gymnasium with a focus on music and European studies, the Gymnasium Ernestinum with Latin and ancient Greek, which was founded in 1328 as the Latin school, and the Hölty Gymnasium with courses in Russian and which has a mathematics and science branch.

The other general schools are the three secondary schools (Realschulen) (Westercelle, Auf der Heese, Burgstraße), six combined primary (Grundschulen) and secondary modern (Hauptschulen) schools (Altstadt, Blumlage, Groß Hehlen, Heese-Süd, Neustadt, Wietzenbruch) as well as nine primary schools. In addition there are also the Catholic primary school (Katholische Schule) and the Montessori primary and secondary school, Freie Aktive Schule Celle.

==== Vocational schools ====
Celle has four vocational establishments (Berufsbildende Schulen or BBS): BBS I − Economics and Administration, BBS II (Axel Bruns Schule) − Technology, Design and IT, BBS III − Health and Social Studies − and BBS IV (Albrecht Thaer Schule) − Agriculture, Domestic Science and Nutrition.

==== Other educational establishments ====
Since 2003 Celle has been the location for the private College of Economics (Fachhochschule der Wirtschaft or FHDW), which offers courses of studies in mechatronics and the Bachelor of Business Administration. Another important educational establishment in Celle is the Bohrmeisterschule which is a technical college for drilling, extraction and pipeline technology.

Celle is home to one of the two Lower Saxony State Firefighting Schools. It was also the location of the Celler Schule, one of the GEMA foundation institutions for up and coming songwriters, from 1996 to 2008, before it moved to Springe.

In addition there is an adult education centre in Celle, which has numerous branches in the surrounding districts.

== Around Celle ==
Celle is known for being an entry point for tourists to the Lüneburg Heath. Bergen-Belsen concentration camp, where Anne Frank died in 1945, is located in the district of Celle; today, a memorial and exhibition centre mark the camp site.

== Notable people ==
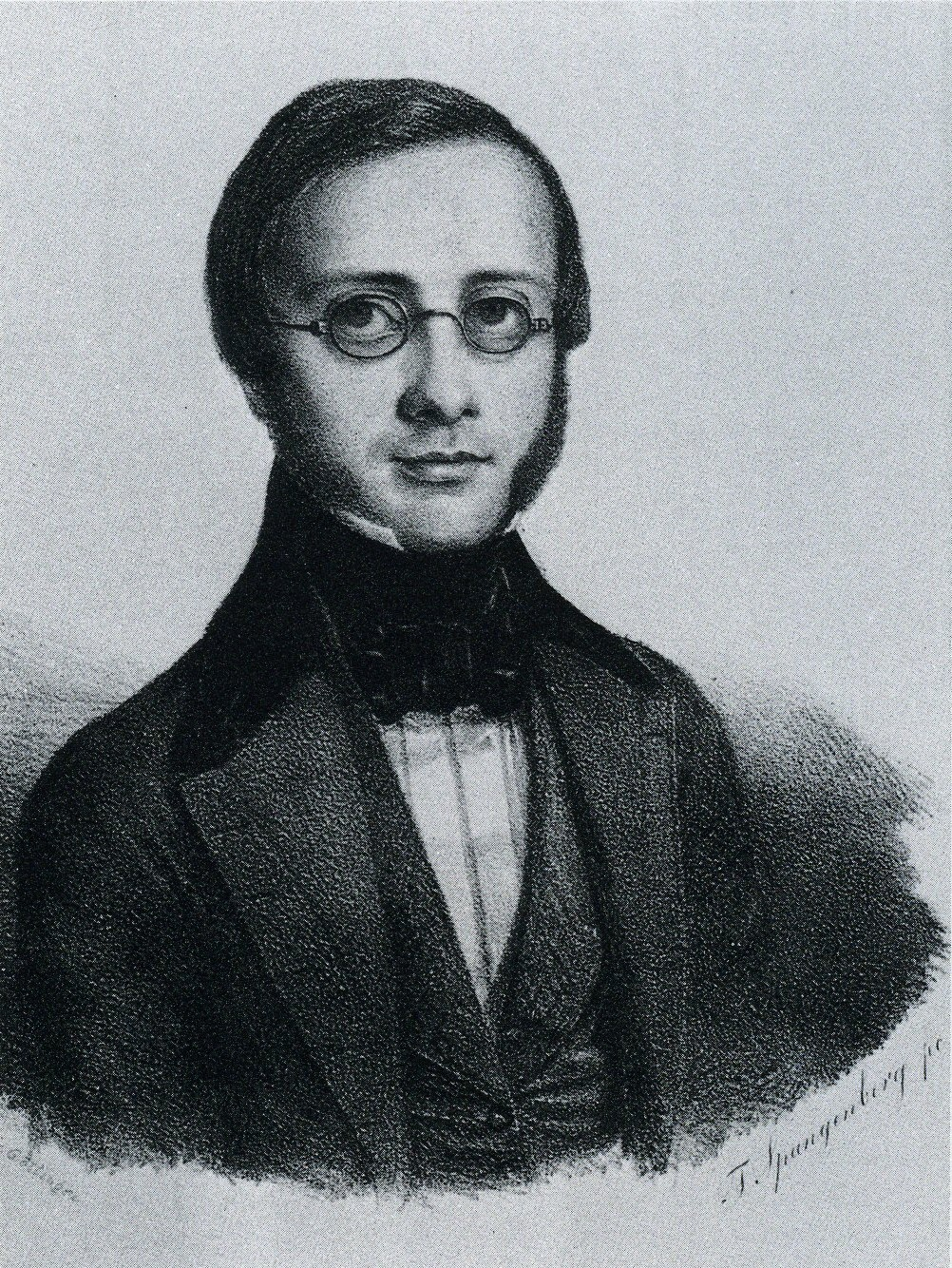
Friedrich Wieseler

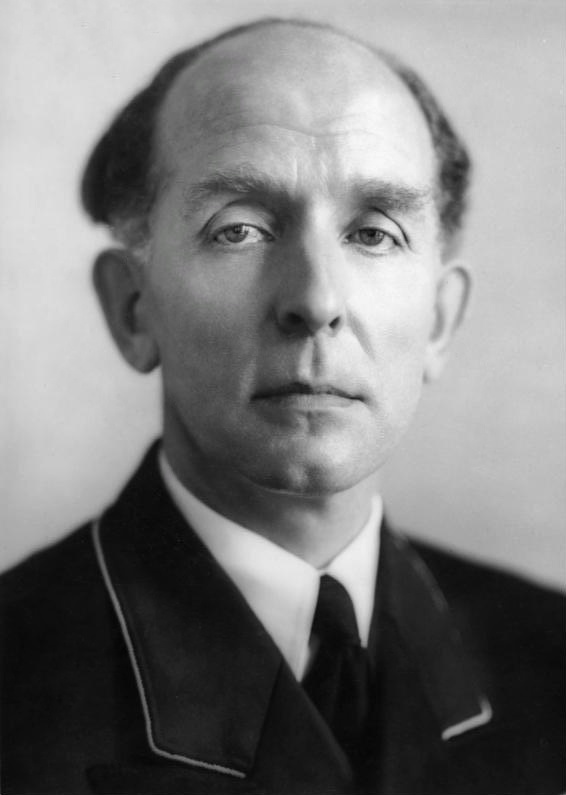
Roland Freisler, 1942

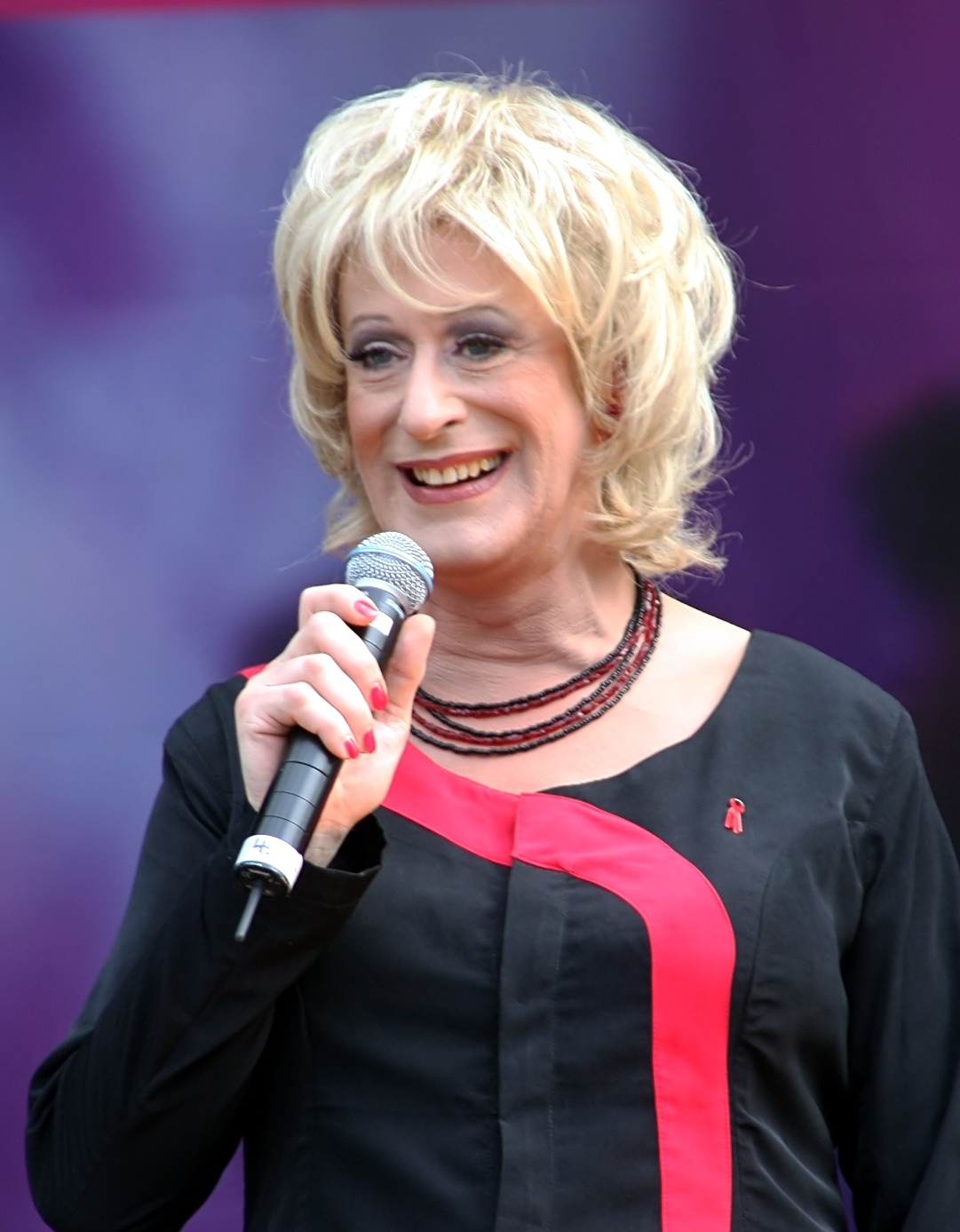
Lilo Wanders, 2009

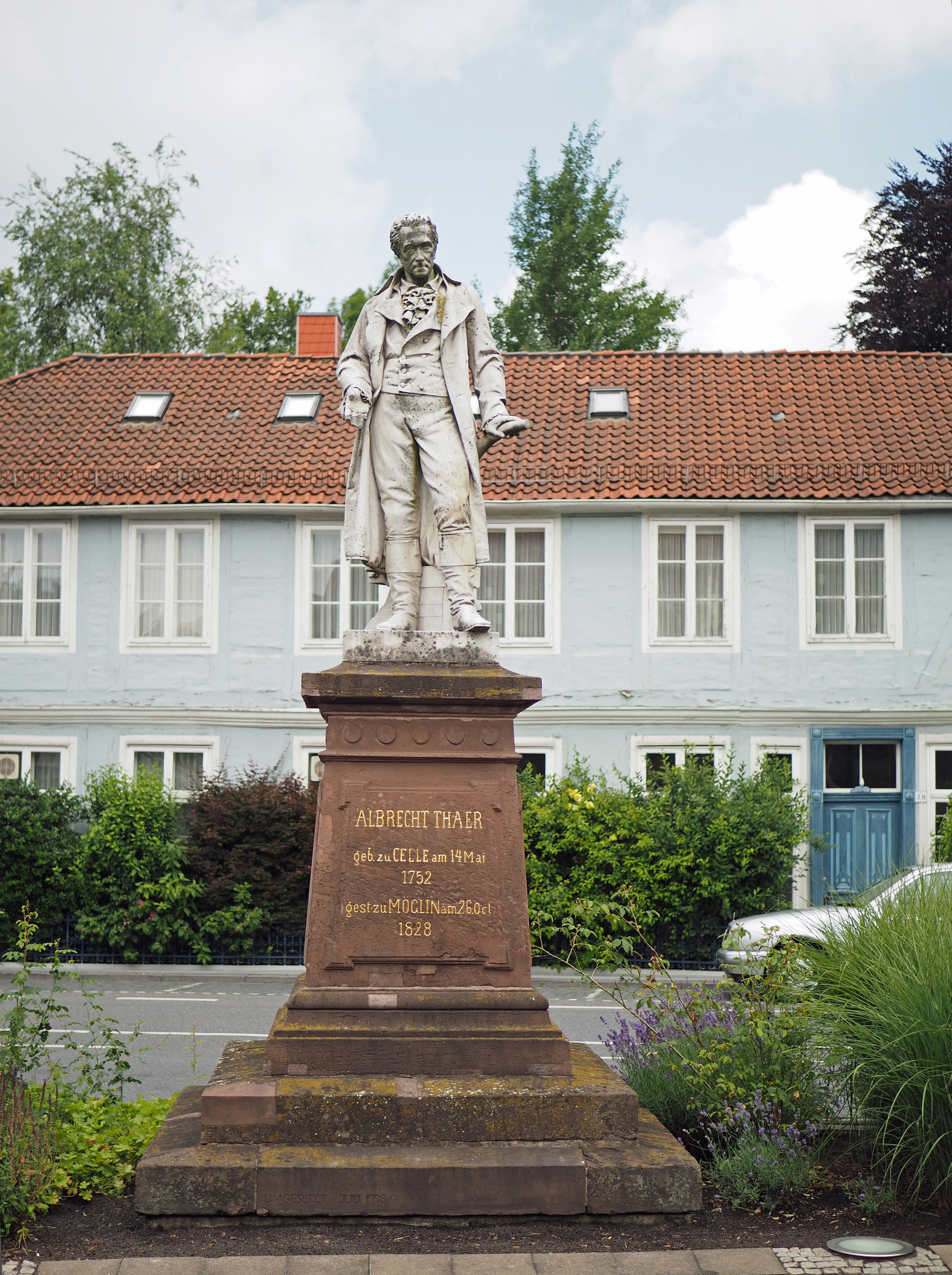
Albrecht Thaer monument

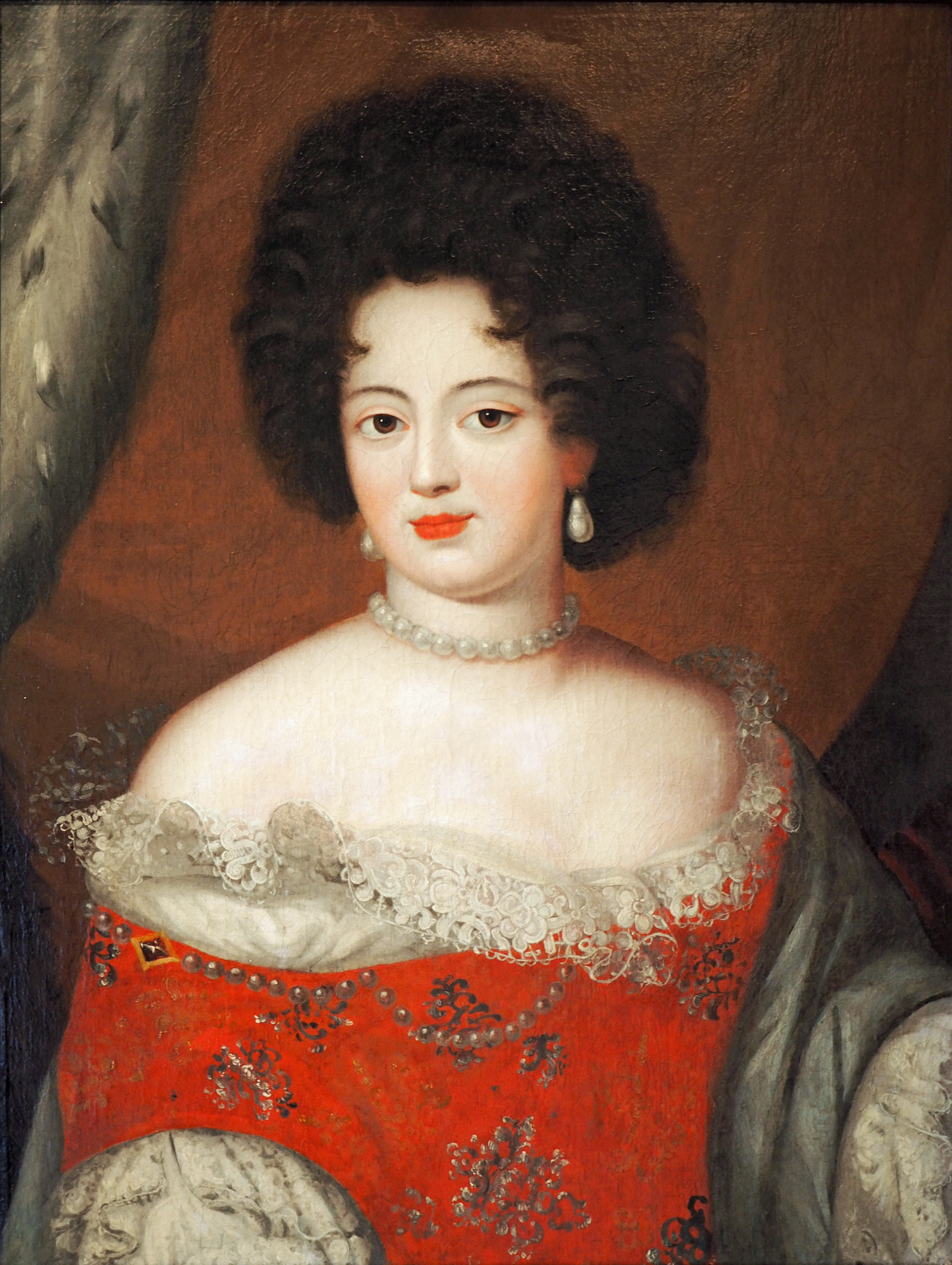
Sophia Dorothea of Celle, 1690's

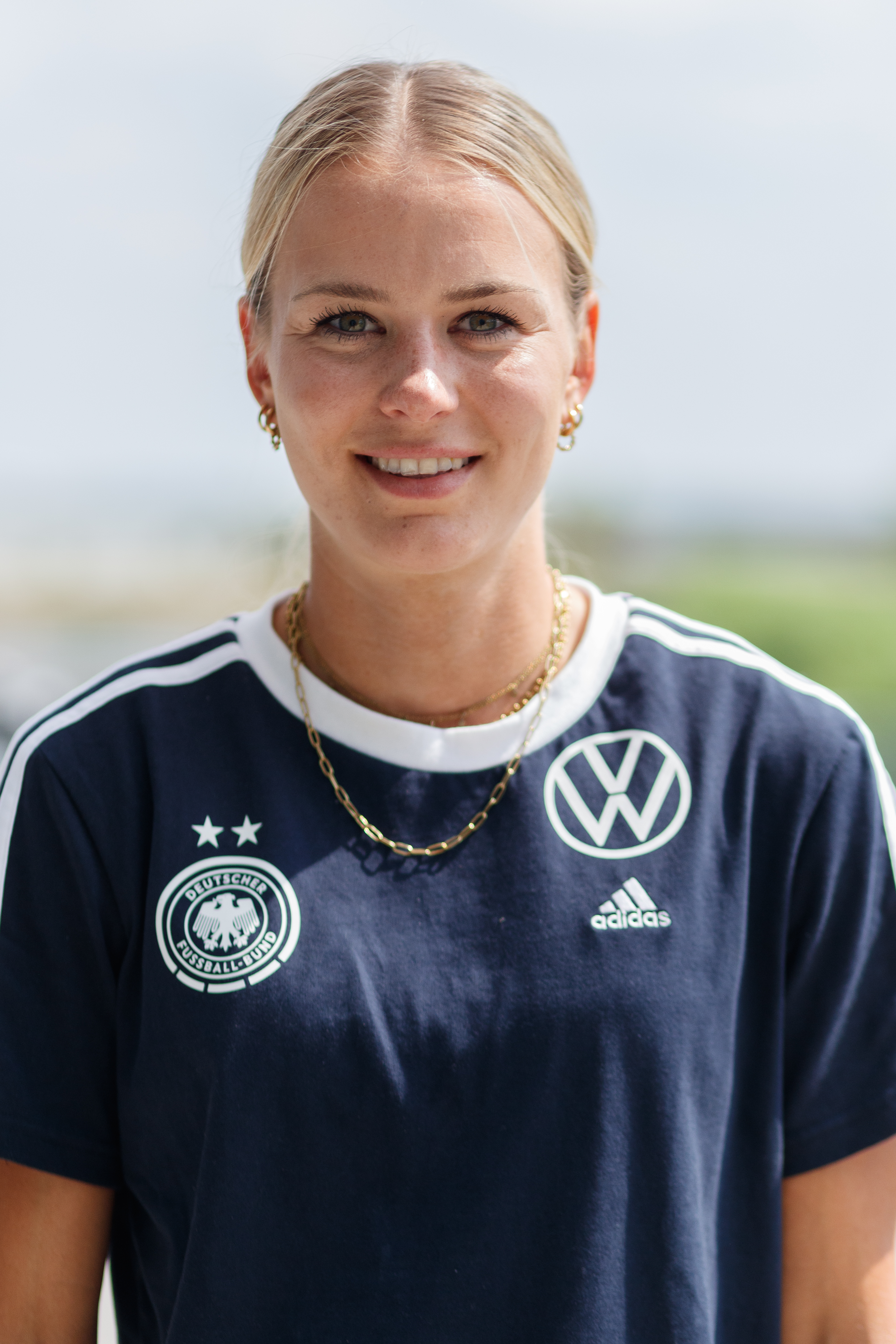
Merle Frohms, 2023

=== Public working and thinking ===
- Anton Wilhelm von L'Estocq (1738–1815), Prussian cavalry general, commander at the Battle of Eylau
- Georg Seyler (1800–1866), theologian, priest and the adoptive father of Felix Hoppe-Seyler
- Friedrich Wieseler (1811–1892), German classical archaeologist and philologist
- Karl Goedeke (1814–1887), literary historian, author, and a professor.
- Fritz Schultze (1846–1908), a German philosopher.
- Admiral Eduard von Capelle (1855–1931), a German Imperial Navy officer
- Friedrich Pfotenhauer (1859–1939), fifth president of the Lutheran Church–Missouri Synod
- Robert Lehr (1883–1956), politician (DNVP, CDU)
- Roland Freisler (1893–1945), lawyer, judge and politician (Nazi Party)
- Feleknas Uca (born 1976), politician (The Left)

=== The Arts ===
- Johann Ernst Galliard (1687–1749), German composer
- Ernst Schulze (1789–1817), Romantic poet
- Georg Bergmann (1821–70), a German painter of historical subjects and portraits
- Wilhelm Hauers (1836–1905), architect in Hamburg
- Ernst Emil Herzfeld (1879–1948), German Near Eastern archaeologist, orientalist and epigraphists; Co-founder of the Near Eastern and Islamic archaeology, architecture and art history and founder of Iranian archeology
- Theodor Krüger (1891–1966), composer and musician
- August Schirmer (1905–1948), architect, civil engineer, main branch manager of Amt Rosenberg and member of parliament (Nazi Party)
- Volker Ullrich (born 1943), historian, journalist and author
- Wolfgang Kubin (born 1945), a German poet, essayist, sinologist and translator of literary works
- Bettina Hohls (born 1947), a German artist and designer
- Ernie Reinhardt (born 1955), actor (pseudonym Lilo Wanders)
- Gabi Bauer (born 1962), journalist television presenter
- Michael Renkel (born 1965), German concert guitarist
- Matthias Blazek (born 1966), German free journalist, historian and publicist
- Silke Schatz (born 1967), an artist who makes drawings, sculptures and installations
- Christian Oliver (1972–2024), actor
- Alex Boyd (born 1984), Scottish photographer

=== Science & business ===
- Albrecht Thaer (1752–1828), founder of agricultural science
- Ludwig Aaron Gans (1794–1871), a German industrialist and owner of the company Cassella
- Heiko Harborth (born 1938), Professor of Mathematics at Braunschweig University of Technology
- Gustav Humbert (born 1950), former chief executive officer and president of Airbus
- Karl-Henning Rehren (born 1956), a German physicist who focuses on algebraic quantum field theory
- Ante Zelck (born 1963), entrepreneur and hostel pioneer
- Robert Hermes (born 1969), a veterinarian researcher at The Leibniz-Institute of Zoo and Wildlife Research in Berlin

=== Aristocracy ===
- Anna of Brunswick-Lüneburg (1502–1568), a princess of Brunswick-Lüneburg
- Margaret of Brunswick-Lüneburg (1573–1643), member of the House of Welf
- George, Duke of Brunswick-Luneburg (1582–1670), ruled as Prince of Calenberg from 1635.
- Sophia Dorothea of Celle (1666–1726), wife of George I of Great Britain and mother of George II of Great Britain
- Ernst von Gemmingen (1759–1813), a German aristocrat and composer

=== Sport ===
- Hermann Schridde (1937–1985), show jumper and manager of the German show jumping team; silver and team gold medallist at the 1964 Summer Olympics
- Hans Mueh (born 1944), emigrated to USA 1951, director of athletics at the United States Air Force Academy from 2004 until 2015
- Kersten Meier (1954–2001), a German swimmer who competed in the 1972 Summer Olympics
- Frauke Eickhoff (born 1967), German Olympic judoka
- Dustin Brown (born 1984), Jamaican-German tennis player
- Merle Frohms (born 1995), German football player; played 47 games for Germany

=== Residents of Celle ===
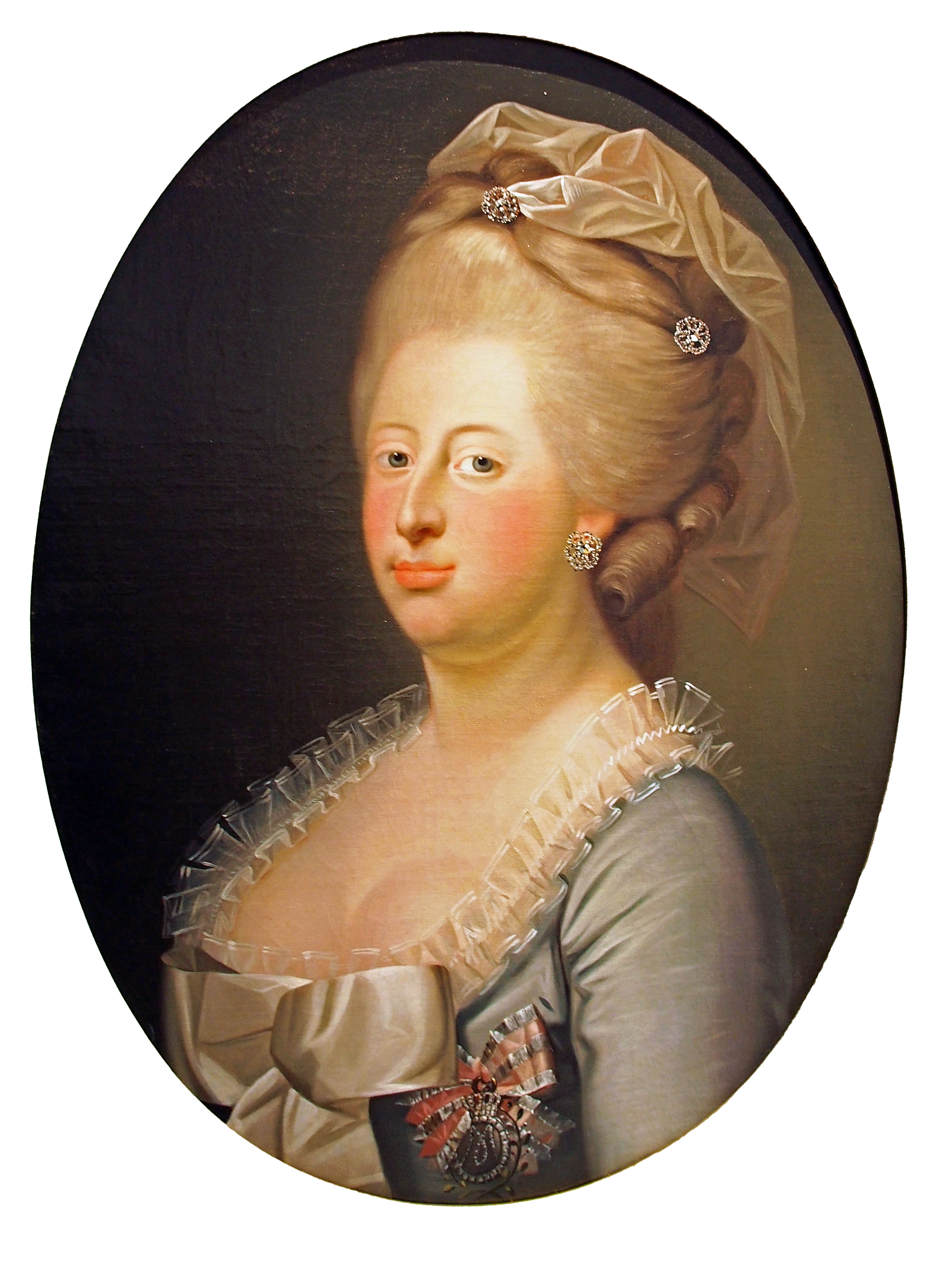
Caroline Mathilde, 1771

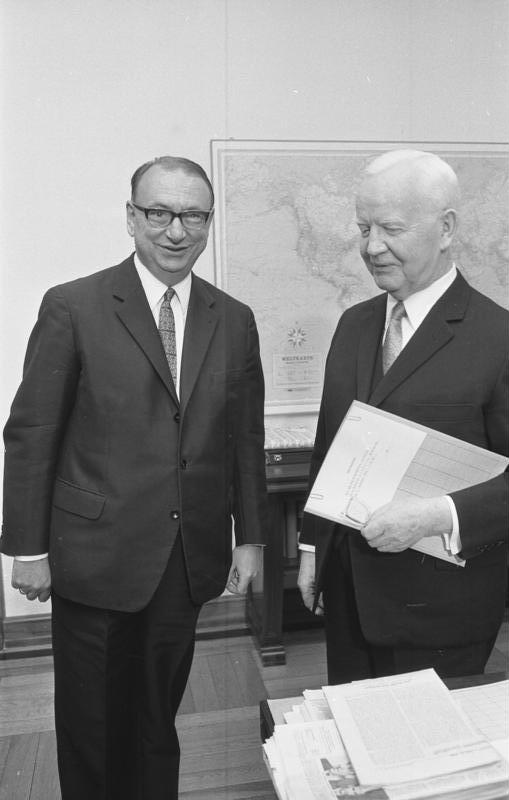
Heinrich Albertz (left) with President Heinrich Lübke 1966

- Urbanus Rhegius, (or Urban Rieger) (1489–1541), Protestant reformer, died locally
- Johann Arndt (1555–1621), post-Reformation theologian; died locally.
- George William, Duke of Brunswick-Lüneburg (1624–1705), ruled from 1665 to his death in Celle Castle as the last "Heath Duke" of the House of Welf
- Samuel Chappuzeau (1625–1701), playwright and author; lived locally from 1682; Head of Pages for George William, Duke of Brunswick from 1682 to 1701
- Christoph Chappuzeau, (German Wiki) (1656–1734), (Son of Samuel) private secretary of Duke of Brunswick-Lüneburg from 1676
- Louise von Plessen (1725–1799), a Danish lady-in-waiting and memoir writer, died locally
- Caroline Mathilde (1751–1775), Queen of Denmark and Norway in exile; died locally
- Johann Anton Leisewitz (1752–1806), writer and lawyer
- Hermann Löns (1866–1914), editor and heath poet, lived in Celle, 1903–1912
- Otto Haesler (1880–1962), architect, with Walter Gropius and Ludwig Mies van der Rohe an important representative of the New Architecture outside the Bauhaus; worked locally from 1906
- Heinrich-Hermann von Hülsen (1895–1982), Wehrmacht generalmajor, died locally
- Siegfried Westphal (1902–1982), Wehrmacht officer, general of cavalry, died locally
- Ernst Zierke (1905–1972), Unterscharführer, SS member involved in the "T4" euthanasia program and "Aktion Reinhardt", lived and died locally
- Heinrich Schmidt (1912–2000), Hauptsturmführer and camp doctor in concentration camps; died locally
- Fritz Darges (1913–2009), Obersturmbannführer and personal aide of Adolf Hitler; died locally
- Fritz Grasshoff (1913–1997), artist, painter, writer and hit songwriter, lived in Celle 1946 to 1967
- Heinrich Albertz (1915–1993), Protestant theologian, after the Second World War pastor in Celle, head of the municipal refugee office, politician (SPD) and mayor of (West) Berlin (1966–1967)
- Yisroel Moshe Olewski (1916–1966), Chief Rabbi of Celle, 1945–1950
- Claude Gewerc (born 1947), French politician, President of the regional council of Picardy; born in Bergen-Belsen
- Harald Range (1948–2018), lawyer, worked locally 1986–1989, Attorney General at the Federal Court, 2011–2015

=== Honorary citizen ===
- Otto Telschow (1876–1945), Nazi Party official, Member of Reichstag 1930–1945. Honorary citizenship granted 1936 and revoked in 2007

== See also ==
- Celle massacre
- Metropolitan region Hannover-Braunschweig-Göttingen-Wolfsburg
