= Lutter (Lachte) =

River in Germany

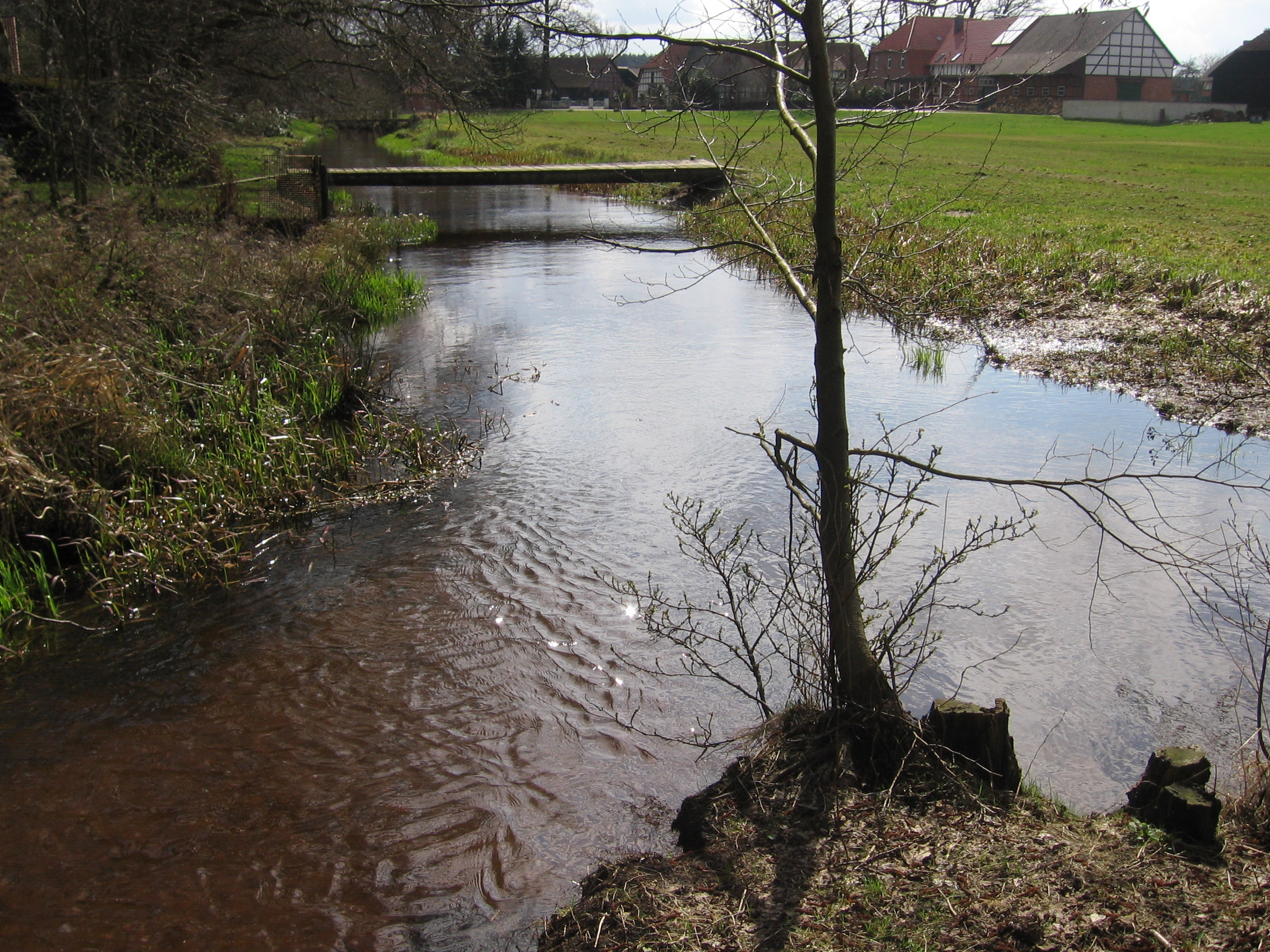

Location
- Country: Germany
- State: Lower Saxony

Physical characteristics
- Source
  - elevation: 93 m (305 ft)
- Mouth
  - location: Lachte north of Weyhausen
  - coordinates: 52.647°N 10.289°E
  - elevation: 51 m (167 ft)
- Length: 25.0 km (15.5 mi)
- Basin size: 148 km^{2} (57 sq mi)

Basin features
- Progression: Lachte→ Aller→ Weser→ North Sea

Lutter (German pronunciation: [ˈlʊtɐ]) is a small river in the Lüneburg Heath, Lower Saxony, Germany, right tributary of the Lachte.

The Lutter has its source near Weyhausen (district of Eschede), 7 km (4.3 mi) southeast of Unterlüß. It passes Bargfeld (where it is joined by the Schmalwasser), Eldingen, and Luttern (a district of Eldingen). It flows into the river Lachte at Jarnsen, near Lachendorf, east of Celle.

== Gallery ==
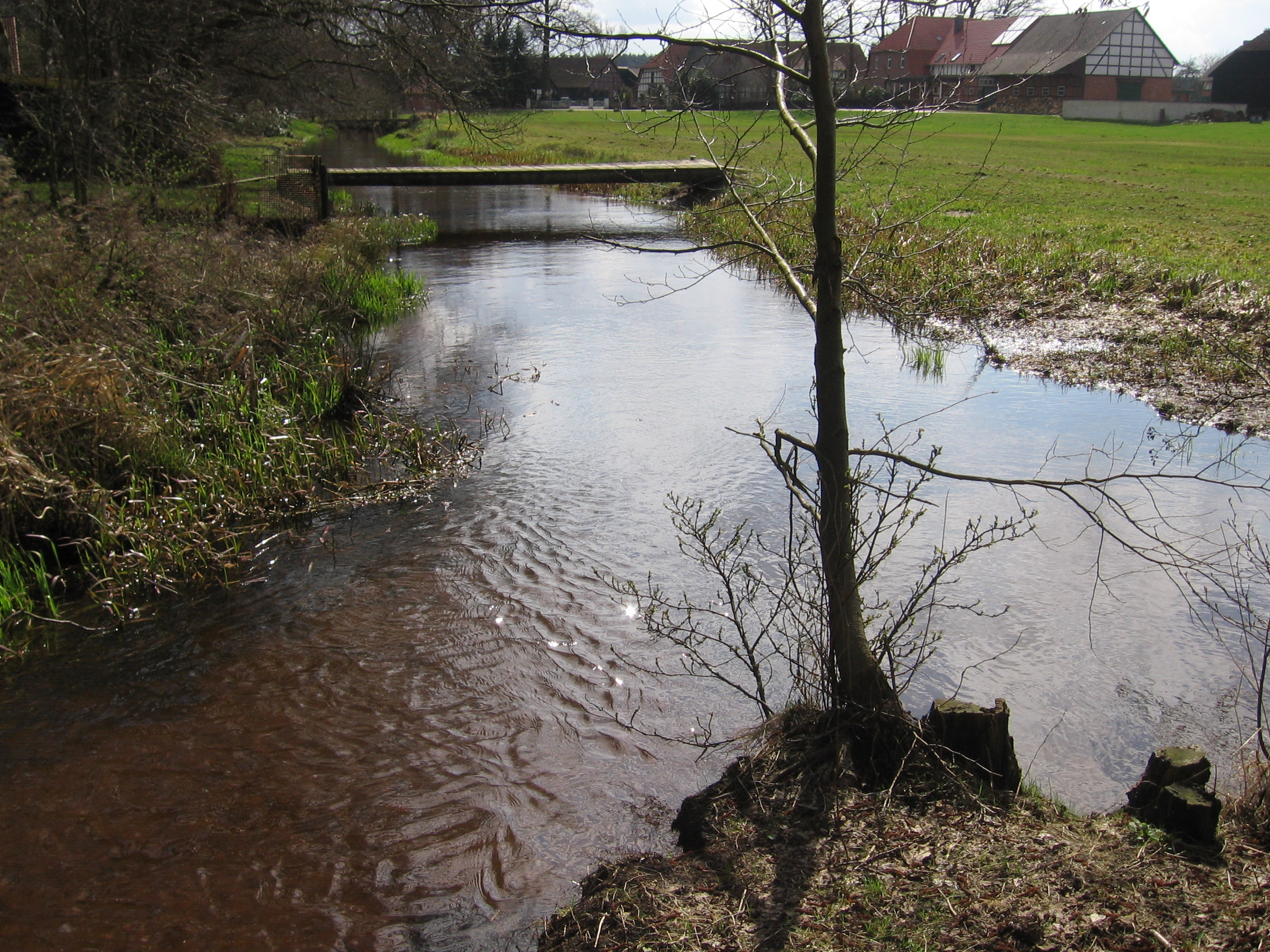
The Schmalwasser joining the Lutter near Bargfeld

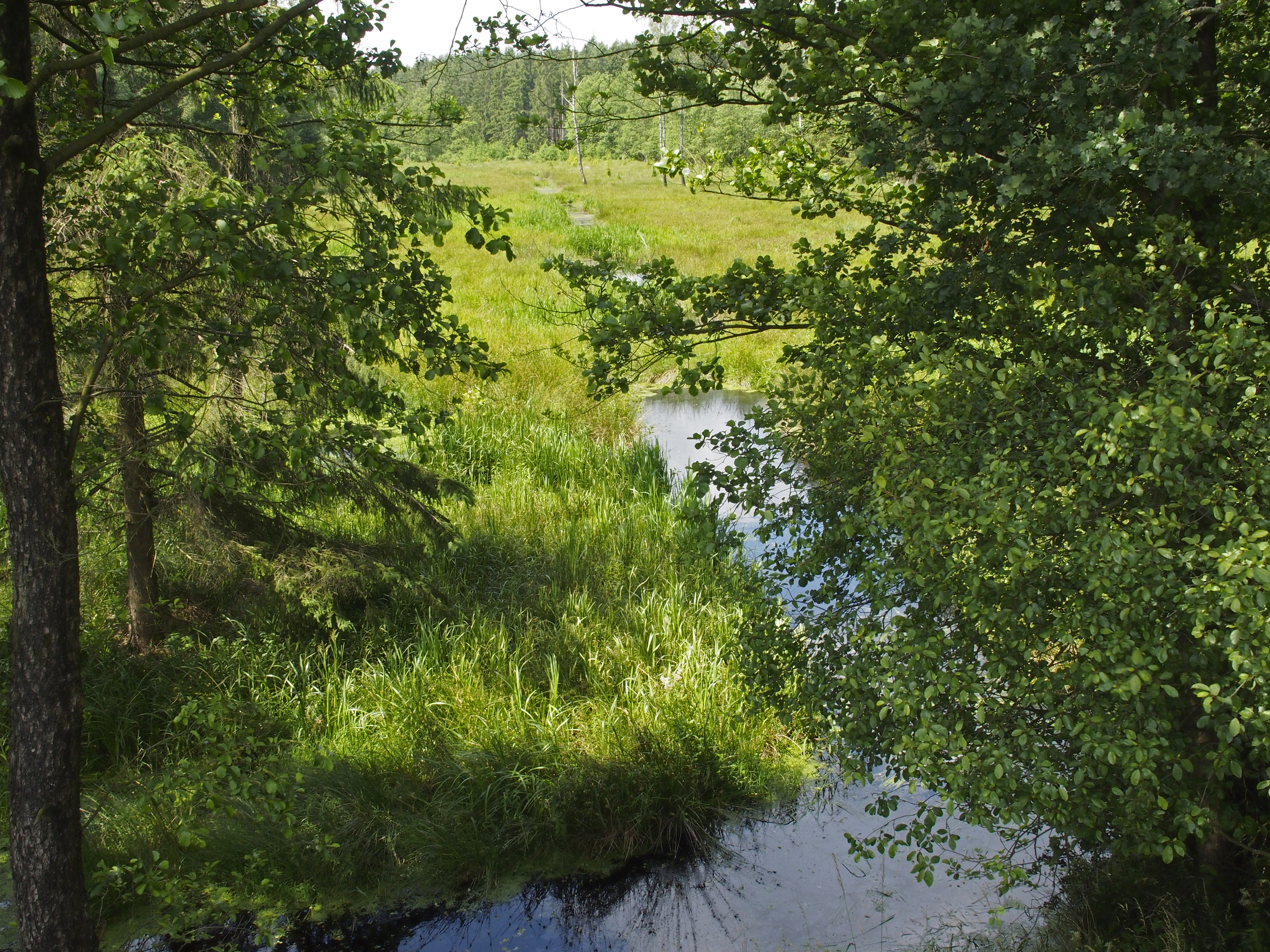
Headwaters of Lutter at Eschede-Weyhausen

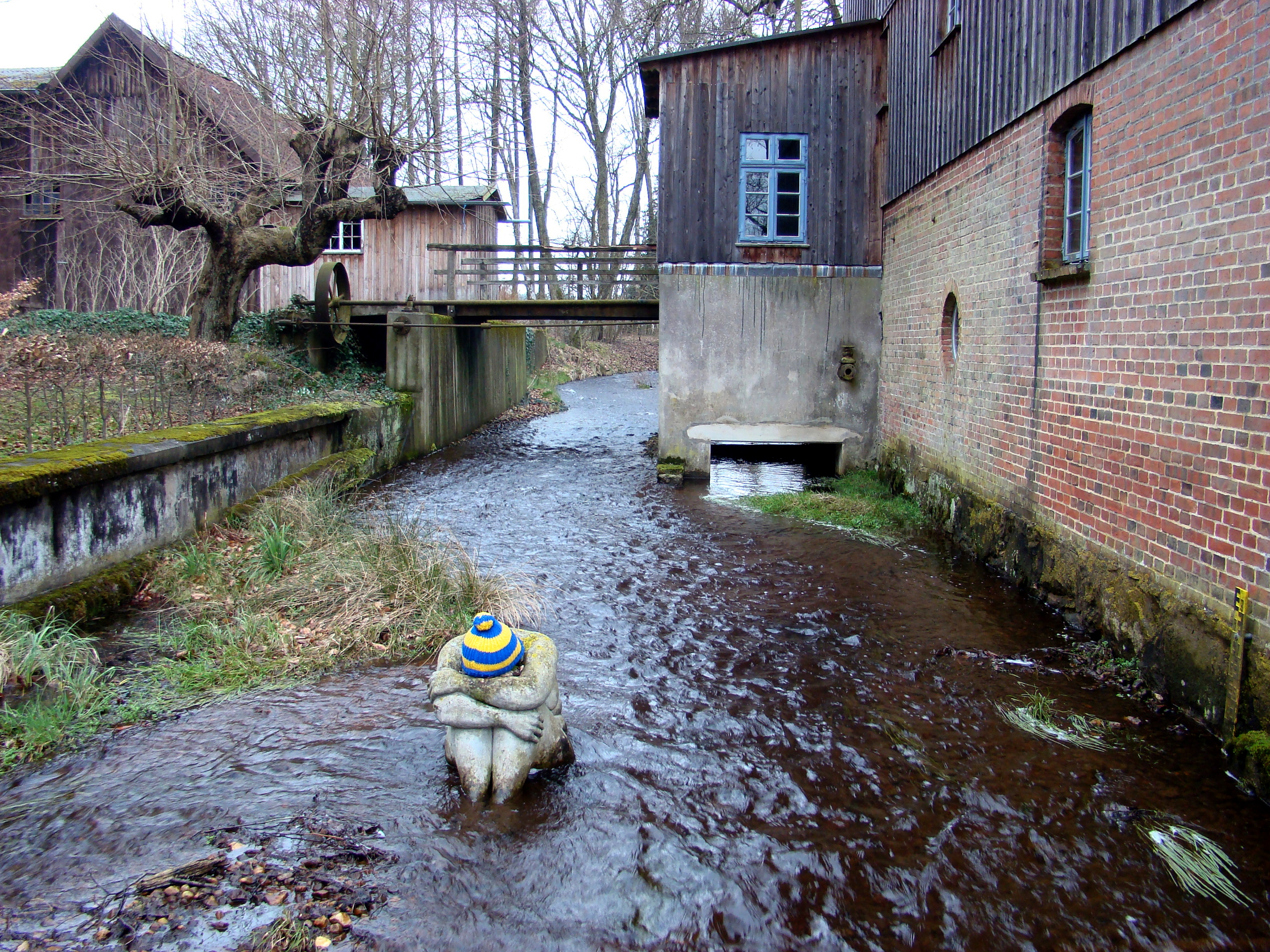
Water mill at Lutter in Marwede (part of Scharnhorst) with the stone sculpture Die Heide aus Lüneburg

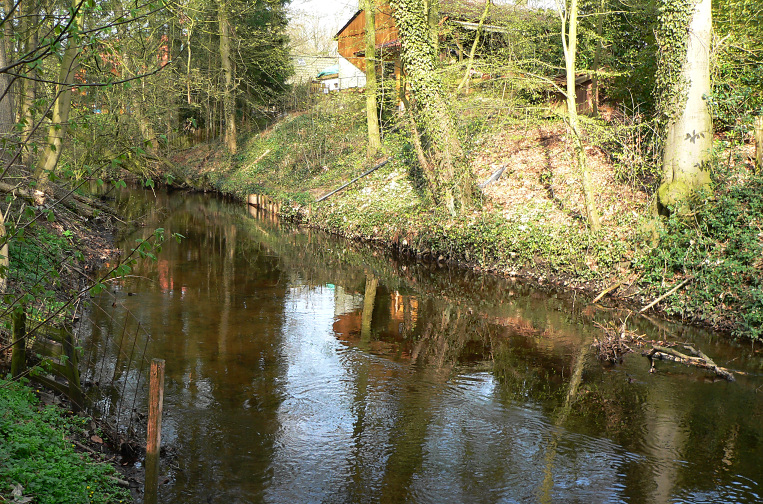
In Luttern, Lower Saxony

== See also ==
- List of rivers of Lower Saxony
