= Beckedorf (Celle district) =

- Ortschaft of Südheide
- Interactive map of Beckedorf
- Location within Germany Location within Lower Saxony
- Coordinates: 52°48′57″N 10°3′30″E
- Country: Germany
- State: Lower Saxony
- District: Celle
- Municipality: Südheide
- Elevation: 62 m (203 ft)

Population
  - Total: 610
- Time zone: UTC+01:00 (CET)
  - Summer (DST): UTC+02:00 (CEST)
- Postal codes: 29320
- Dialling codes: 05052

Beckedorf (German pronunciation: [ˈbɛkədɔʁf]) is a village and Ortschaft in the municipality of Südheide in northern Celle district in the German state of Lower Saxony. Situated on the western edge of the Southern Heath Nature Park in the Lüneburg Heath, about 1 km southwest of Hermannsburg itself, it currently has about 610 inhabitants. The name means "village on the Beke" (i.e. the stream). In old records it can be found as Beketorpe, Bekendorpe or Beckedorp. In 1973 Beckedorf was incorporated into the parish of Hermannsburg as part of Lower Saxony's territorial and administrative reforms.

== Pre-history ==
In 1936 Dr. Hans Piesker, an archaeologist from Hermannsburg, discovered a settlement of the Beaker culture (ca. 4200-2800 BC) northwest of Beckedorf on the Lührsberg, a low hill 77 metres above sea level and 500 metres wide. Of the original settlement, 30,000 square metres in area, numerous post- and settlement pits were exposed, as well as several house structures. The houses had a length of about 6 metres and were dug between 0.80 m and 1.40 m into the ground. They had braided walls (Flechtwände) coated in clay. In addition, arrowheads, scrapers, a spearhead and fragments of axes made of flint were found and shards of pottery excavated. From the discovery of spindle whorls it can be deduced that wool or plant fibres were also processed here.

The other partially surviving barrows in the area, the barrows at Wohlde, the burial site at Bonstorf and the megalithic grave at Dohnsen from the Neolithic age, indicate that there was a settlement here before and during the Bronze Age.

== History ==
The first written mention of Beckedorf dates to the year 1235 in a document which is now in the archives of Walsrode Abbey. Here it mentions that Count Siegfried of Osterburg gave the monastery a few houses that had previously been enfeoffed to the knight, Dietrich of Beckedorpe, who had since died.

== Economy and Transport ==
The place was dominated by the railway. The Celle-Soltau railway run by the East Hanoverian Railways runs through the village and branches here; the line to Munster branches off in Beckedorf (see also Celle-Soltau, Celle-Munster Light Railway). Passenger services were reduced in 1970 and cut entirely in 1976; freight services have reduced considerably. The line to Munster is used primarily for military traffic to Munster Training Area and the line to Soltau for transport to the Bergen-Hohne Training Area.

Today there are several farms in Beckedorf. Some of them even have Treppenspeicher storage barns from the 19th century. A Häuslingshaus has been partly preserved in its original state. Häuslinge were farm workers who worked on the farm and, for a small rent, or even rent-free, were allowed to live in the house.

Through the town flows a small stream, the Hasselbach, which flows into the Örtze.

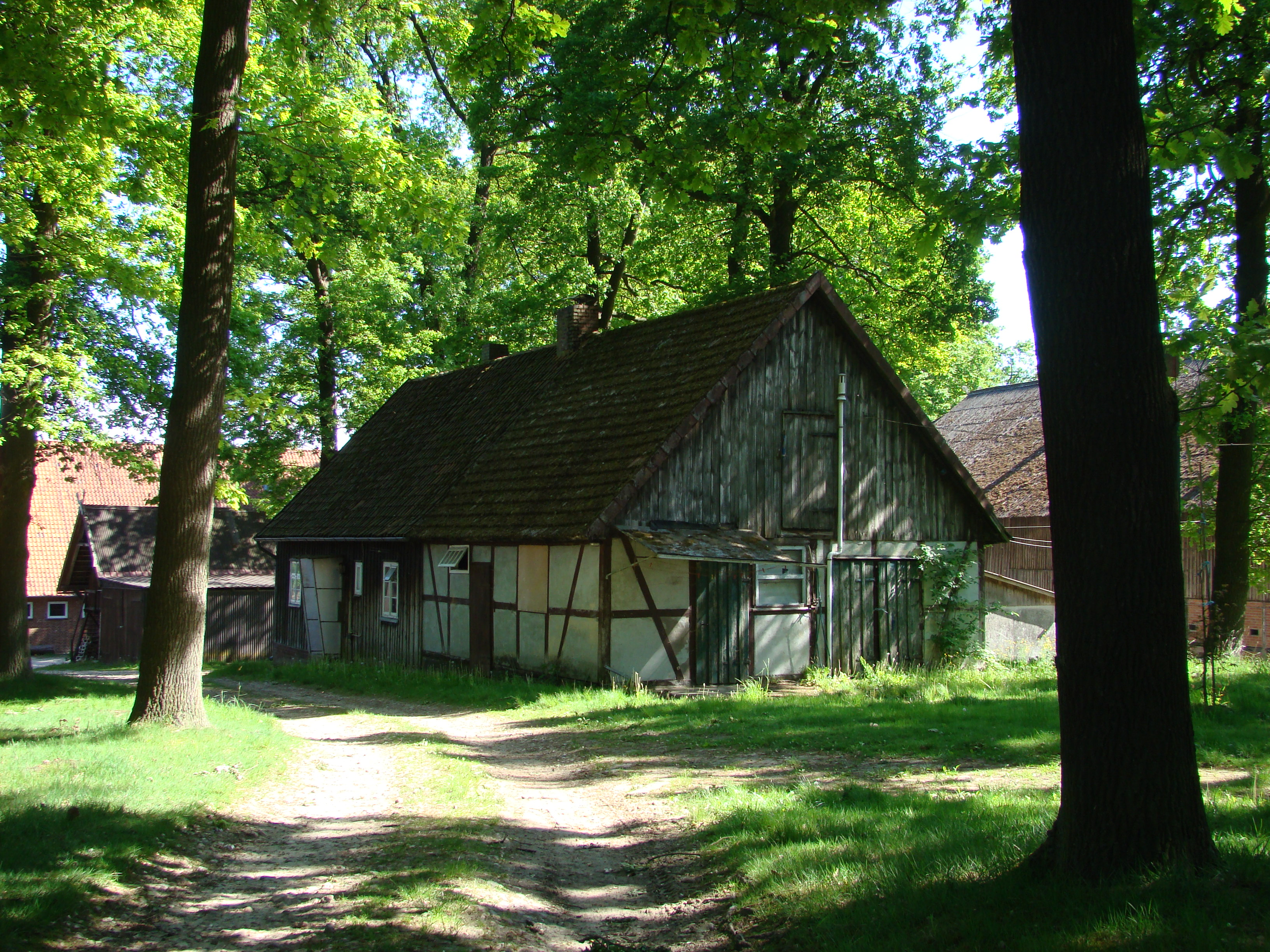
Häuslingshaus and Treppenspeicher barn

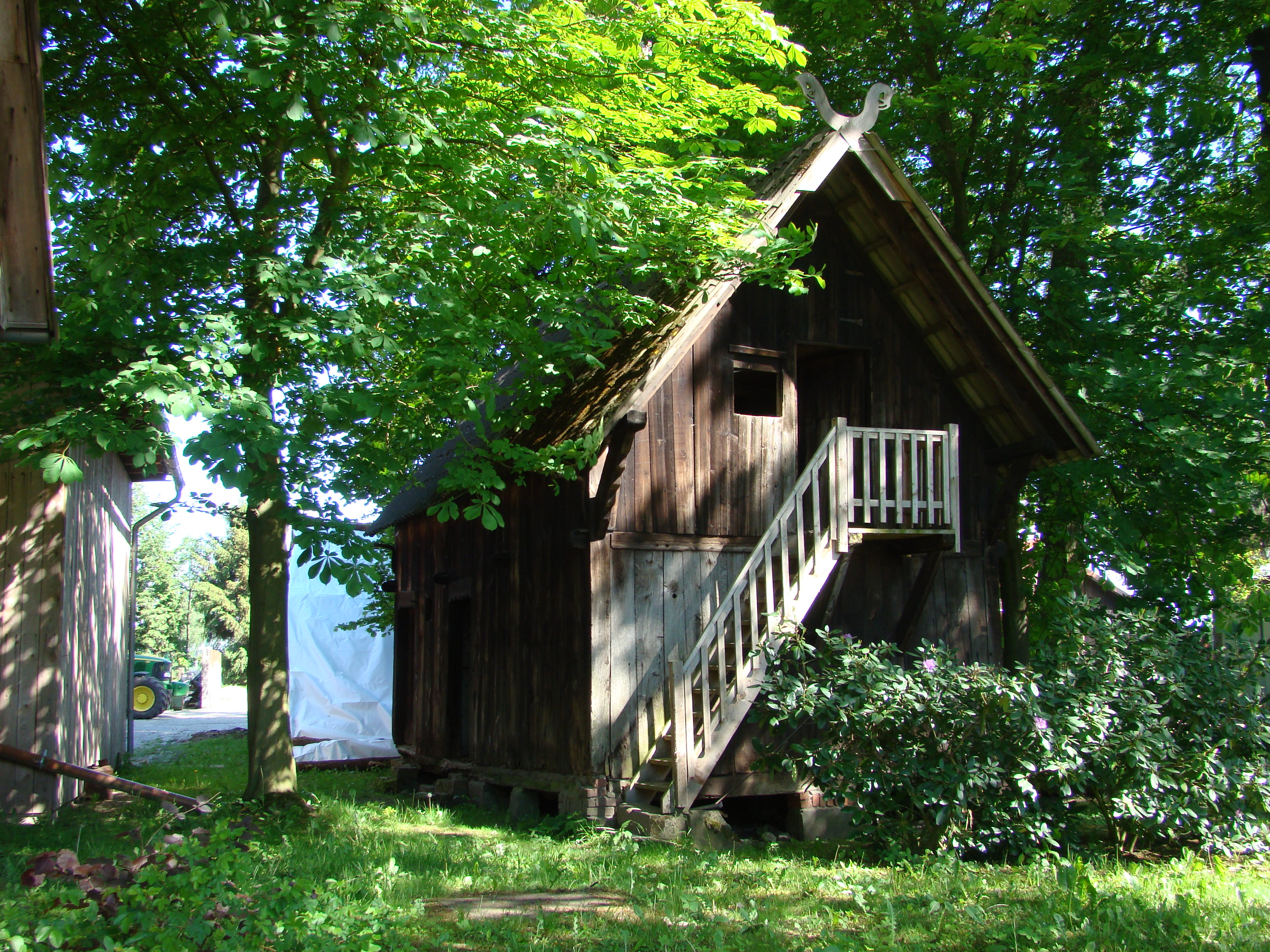
A 19th century Treppenspeicher barn

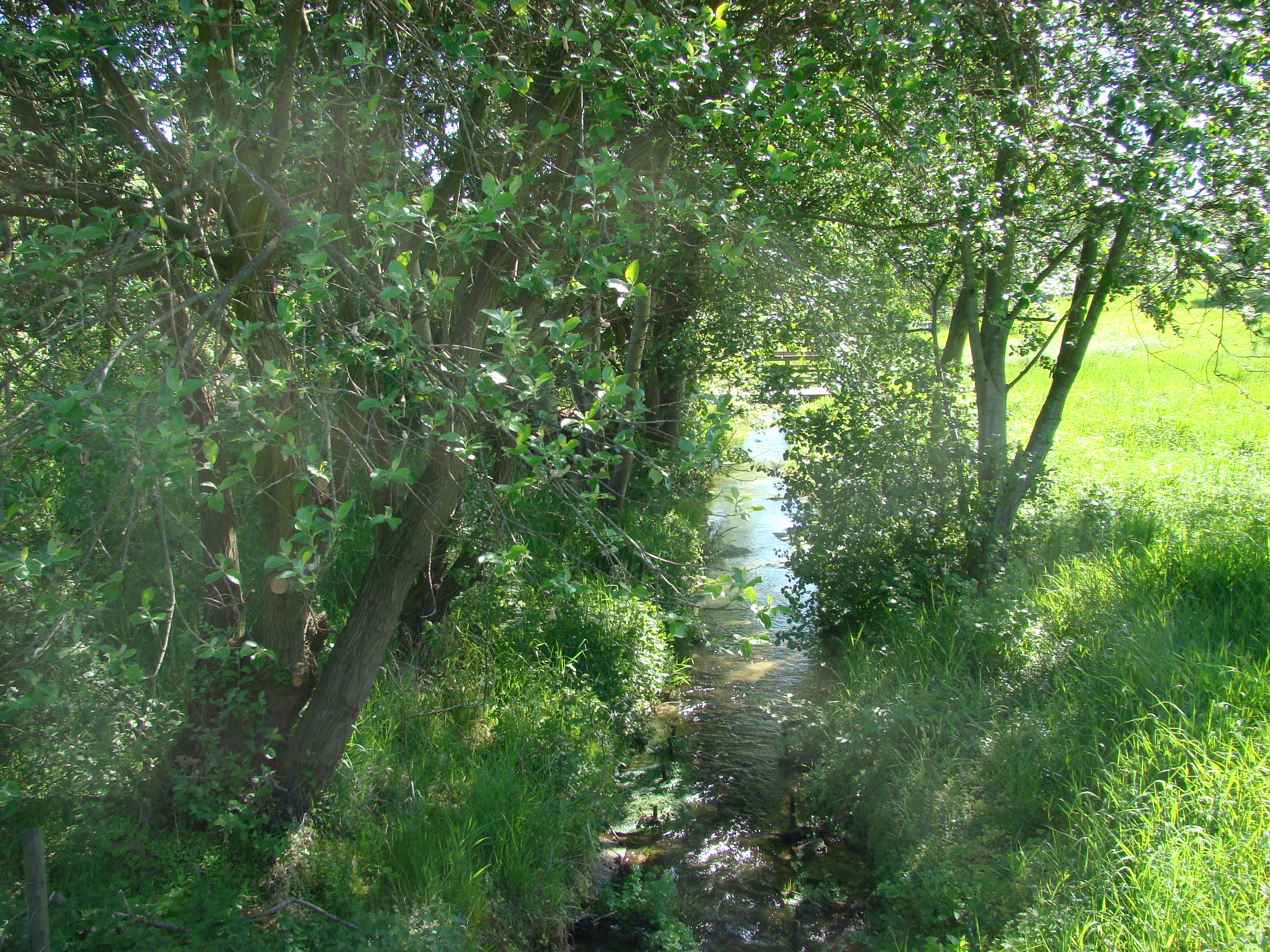
The Hasselbach
