= Eschede (Samtgemeinde) =

Municipality in Lower Saxony, Germany

Coordinates: 52.733°N 10.250°E

Eschede is a former Samtgemeinde ("collective municipality") in the district of Celle, in Lower Saxony, Germany. Its seat was in Eschede. It was disbanded on 1 January 2014.

The Samtgemeinde Eschede consisted of the following municipalities:

1. Eschede
2. Habighorst
3. Höfer
4. Scharnhorst
