= Aschau (Lachte) =

River in Germany

Aschau (Bach)
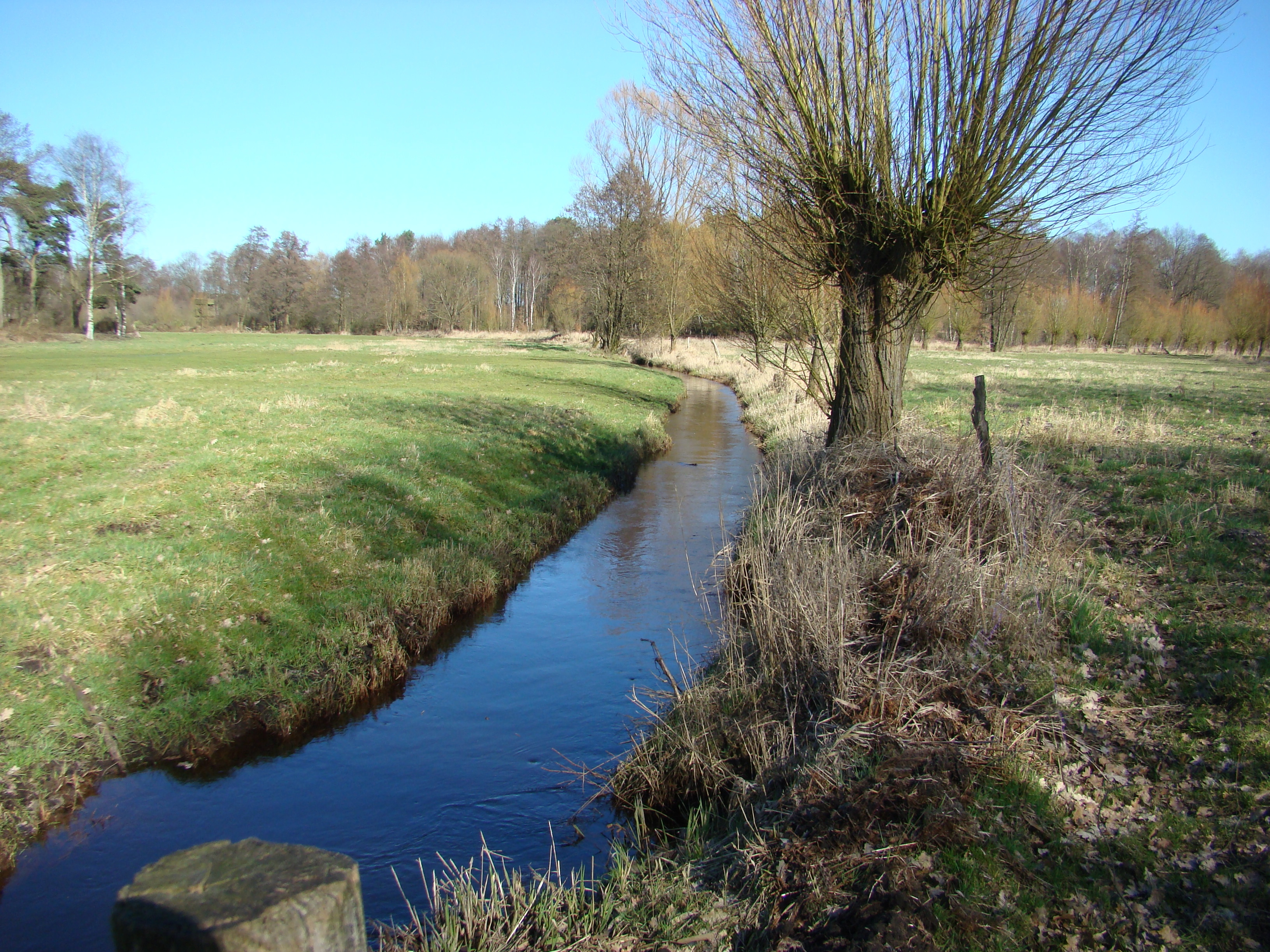
- The Aschau just after leaving the Aschau Ponds

- Location of mouth in Lower Saxony

Location
- Country: Germany
- State: Lower Saxony

Physical characteristics
- Source
  - location: northeast of Eschede, in the Loher Ponds
  - coordinates: 52°46′09.85″N 10°16′14.17″E
  - elevation: 75 m above sea level (NN)
- Mouth
  - location: south of Beedenbostel into the Lachte
  - coordinates: 52°38′01.65″N 10°15′42.00″E
  - elevation: 48 m above sea level (NN)
- Length: 25.0 km (15.5 mi)

Basin features
- Progression: Lachte→ Aller→ Weser→ North Sea
- Landmarks: Villages: Eschede, Habighorst, Höfer, Beedenbostel
- Tributaries
  - left: Dalle-Bach, Postmoorgraben
  - right: Quarmbach

The Aschau (German pronunciation: [ˈaʃaʊ]) is a stream in the Südheide Nature Park in Lower Saxony, Germany, It is a tributary of the Lachte, which in turn discharges into the Aller.

== Source region ==
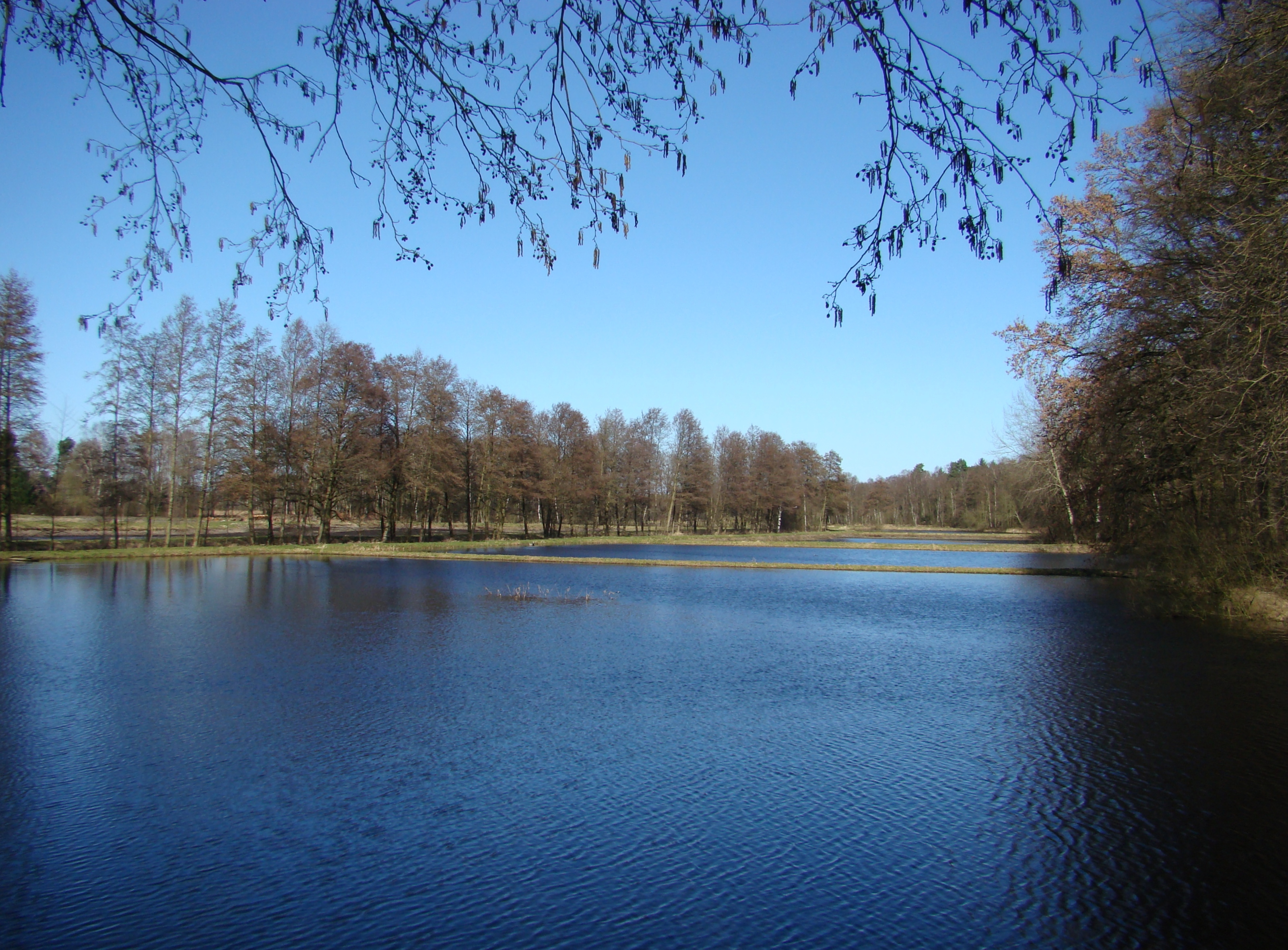
The Aschau Ponds near Eschede

The Aschau originates in Loher Ponds (Loher Teiche), artificially-created in the 1890s. These ponds are fed by a headstream, the Drellebach. In 1903 more ponds were added to the south and designated as the Aschau Ponds (Aschau Teiche). The entire area today consists of about 50 artificial ponds where trout, carp, tench, pike, ide, signal crayfish and noble crayfish are extensively farmed. The area is also a habitat for gudgeon, roach, stickleback, bitterling and swan mussels.

The ponds have been part of a wetland nature reserve since 1982. In 1987 they were also designated as a bird reserve. Since 2003 the area has been an EU bird reserve and since 2005 it has been part of the EU's nature conservation project, Natura 2000, as Special Protection Area 86, the Lachte-Lutter-Aschau Nature Reserve.

== Course ==
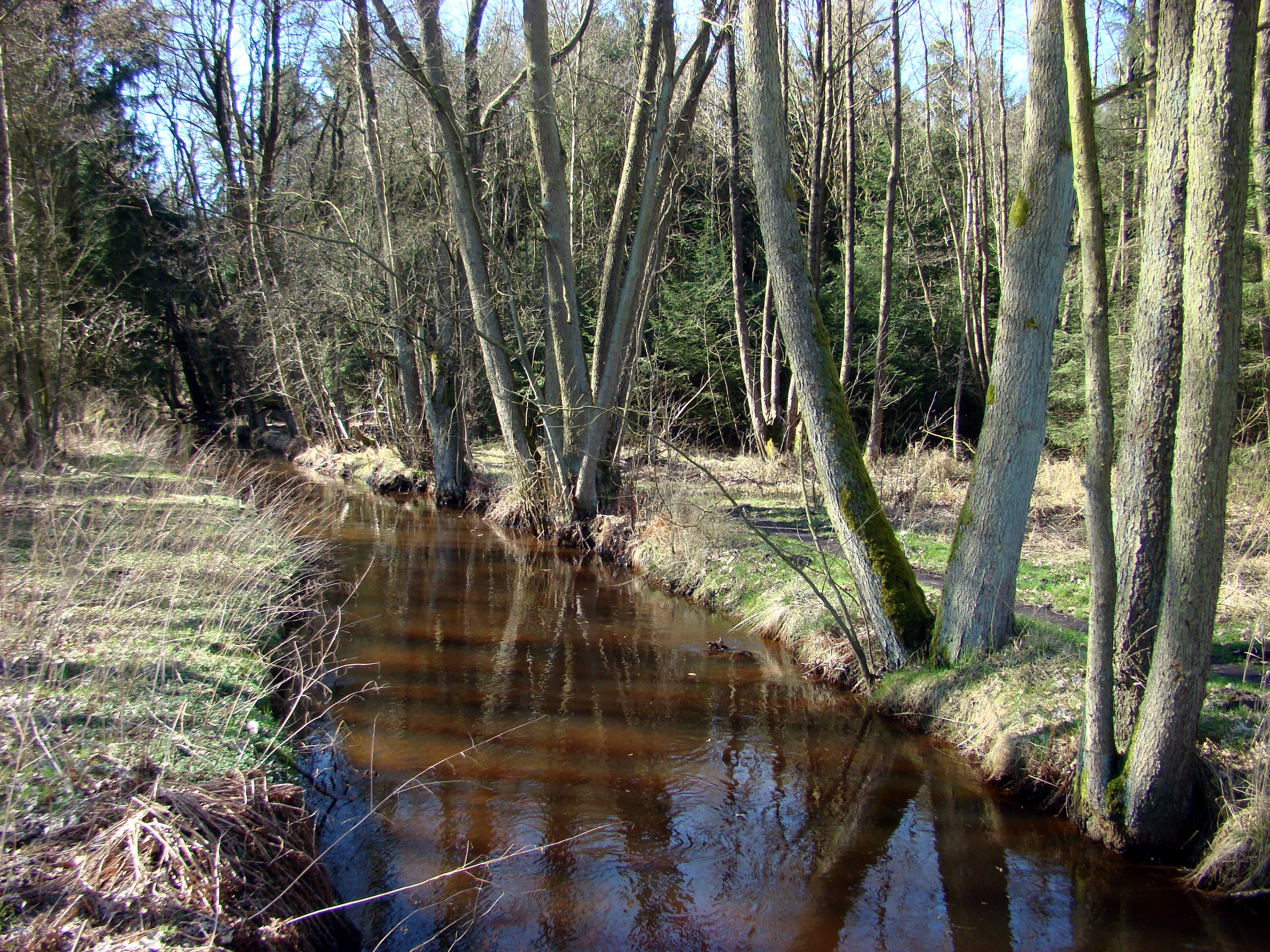
The Aschau just before Eschede in alder carr

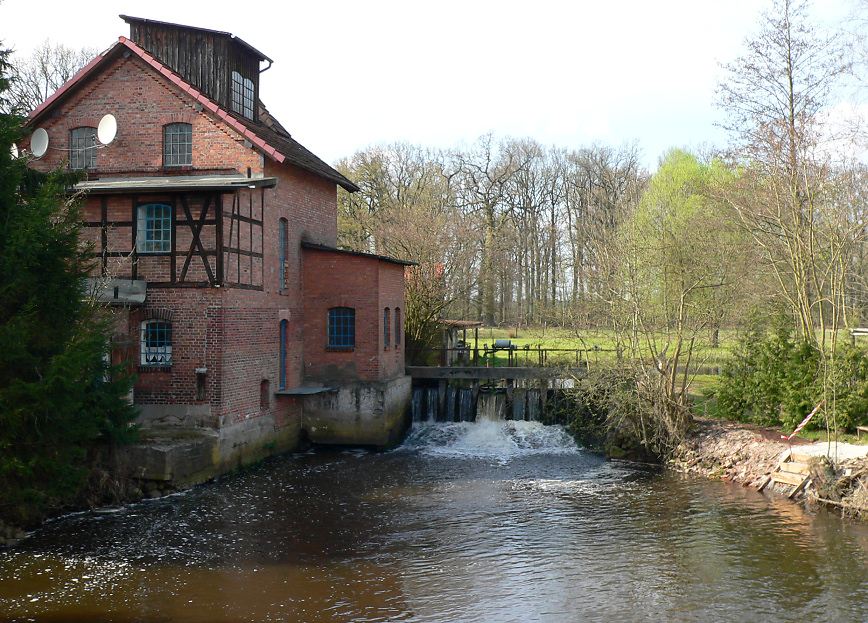
Dam on the Aschau in Beedenbostel with old water mill

After leaving the Loher Ponds, the Aschau picks up the Dallebach and flows in a generally southerly direction, first through the Aschau Ponds. It passes under the B 191 federal road, is joined from the left by the Postmoorgraben, and then flows through extensively managed meadows and natural, original forest to Eschede, before continuing to Habighorst. It then picks up the Quarmbach from the right, a stream which rises in Rahmoor, and which forms a large swamp and lake area just before its confluence with the Aschau. Just north of this area is the Hoppenrieth Nature Reserve.

By the 15th century the Quarmbach had been impounded to drive the local mill, the Quarmühle and some of the ponds must date back to that period. In the 1980s the mill fell into disrepair and later burned down. The Aschau continues past the abandoned Mariaglück potash mine. and on to Höfer. It flows south through Beedenbostel and discharges shortly afterwards into the Lachte.
