= Schmalwasser =

River in Germany

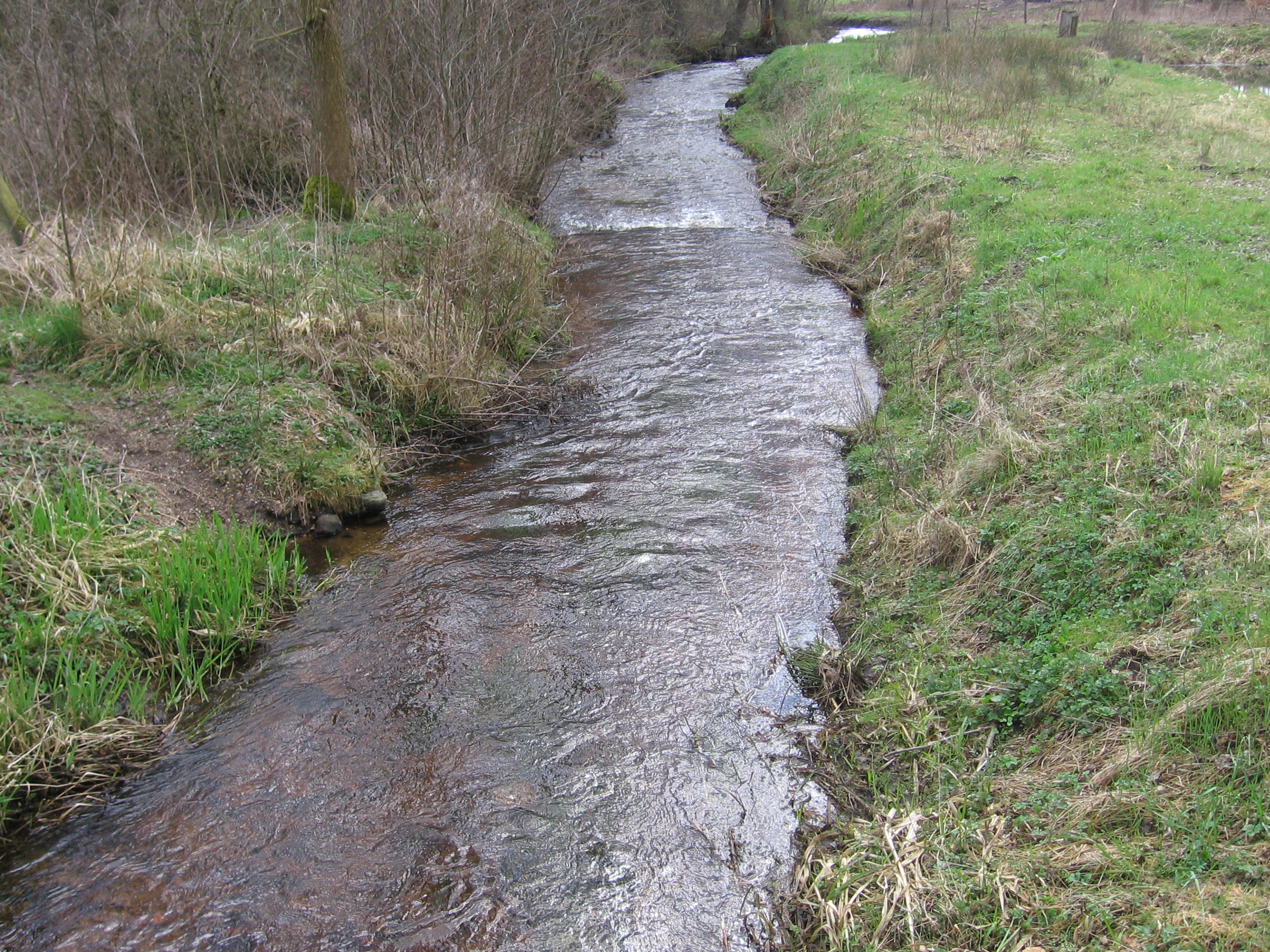
- The Schmalwasser near Bargfeld

Location
- Country: Germany
- State: Lower Saxony

Physical characteristics
- Mouth
  - location: Lutter
  - coordinates: 52.7045°N 10.3447°E
- Length: 11.5 km (7.1 mi)

Basin features
- Progression: Lutter→ Lachte→ Aller→ Weser→ North Sea

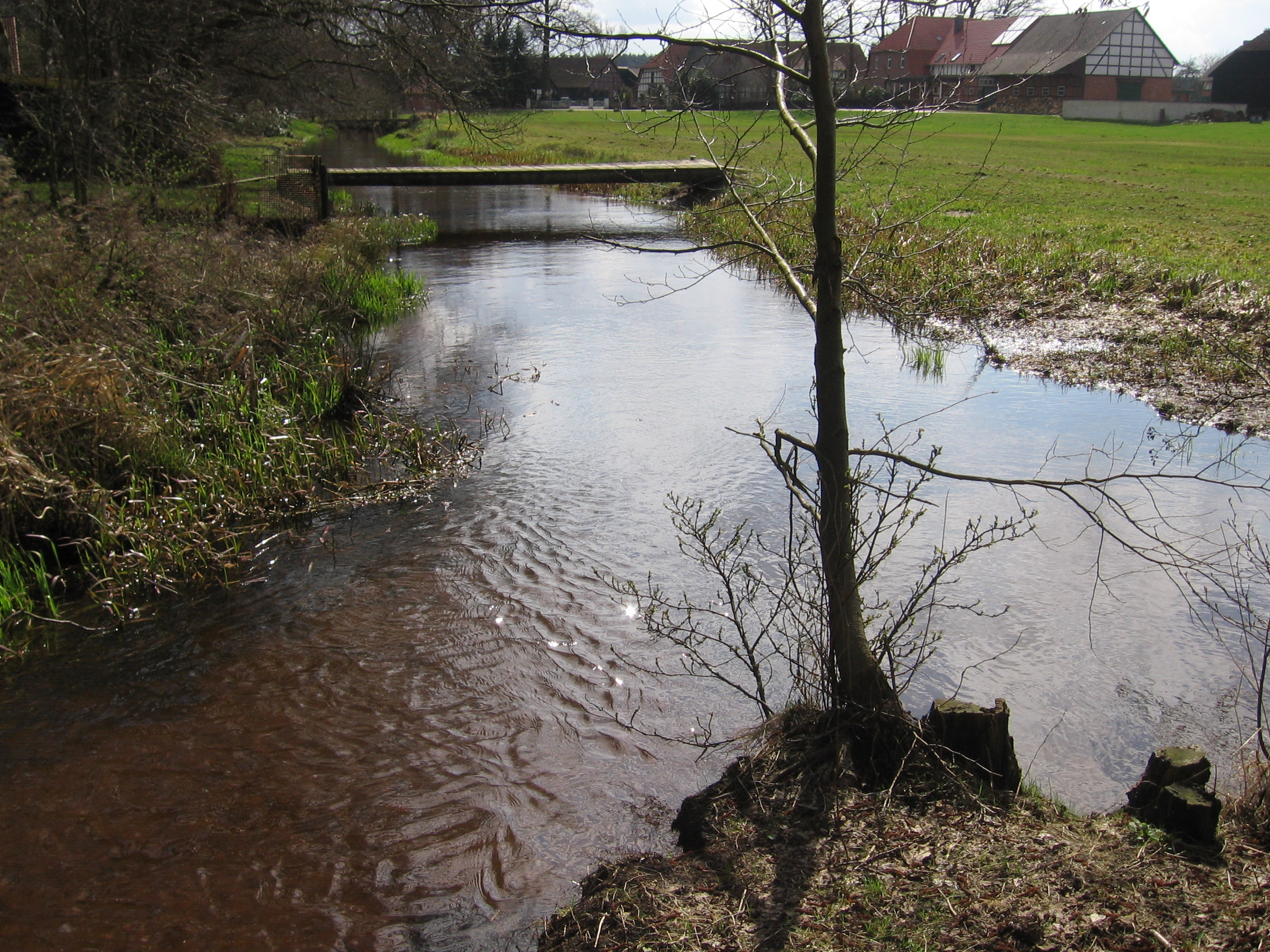
Mouth of the Schmalwasser into the Lutter near Bargfeld (right)

Schmalwasser is a river of Lower Saxony, Germany on the southern edge of the Lüneburg Heath.

The Schmalwasser rises near Blickwedel (a district of Sprakensehl), winds southwards, is joined from the left by the Räderbach and discharges into the Lutter in the village of Bargfeld.

The story Die Wasserstraße by Arno Schmidt (1964) is about a walk up the Schmalwasser.

== See also ==
- List of rivers of Lower Saxony
