= Celle–Wittingen railway =

Railway line

Overview
- Line number: 9173 (Celle–Wittingen); 9174 (Beedenbostel–Mariaglück)

Service
- Route number: formerly 156, 211f

Technical
- Line length: 57.95 km (36.01 mi)
- Track gauge: 1,435 mm (4 ft 8 1/2 in)
- Operating speed: 60 km/h (37 mph) max.

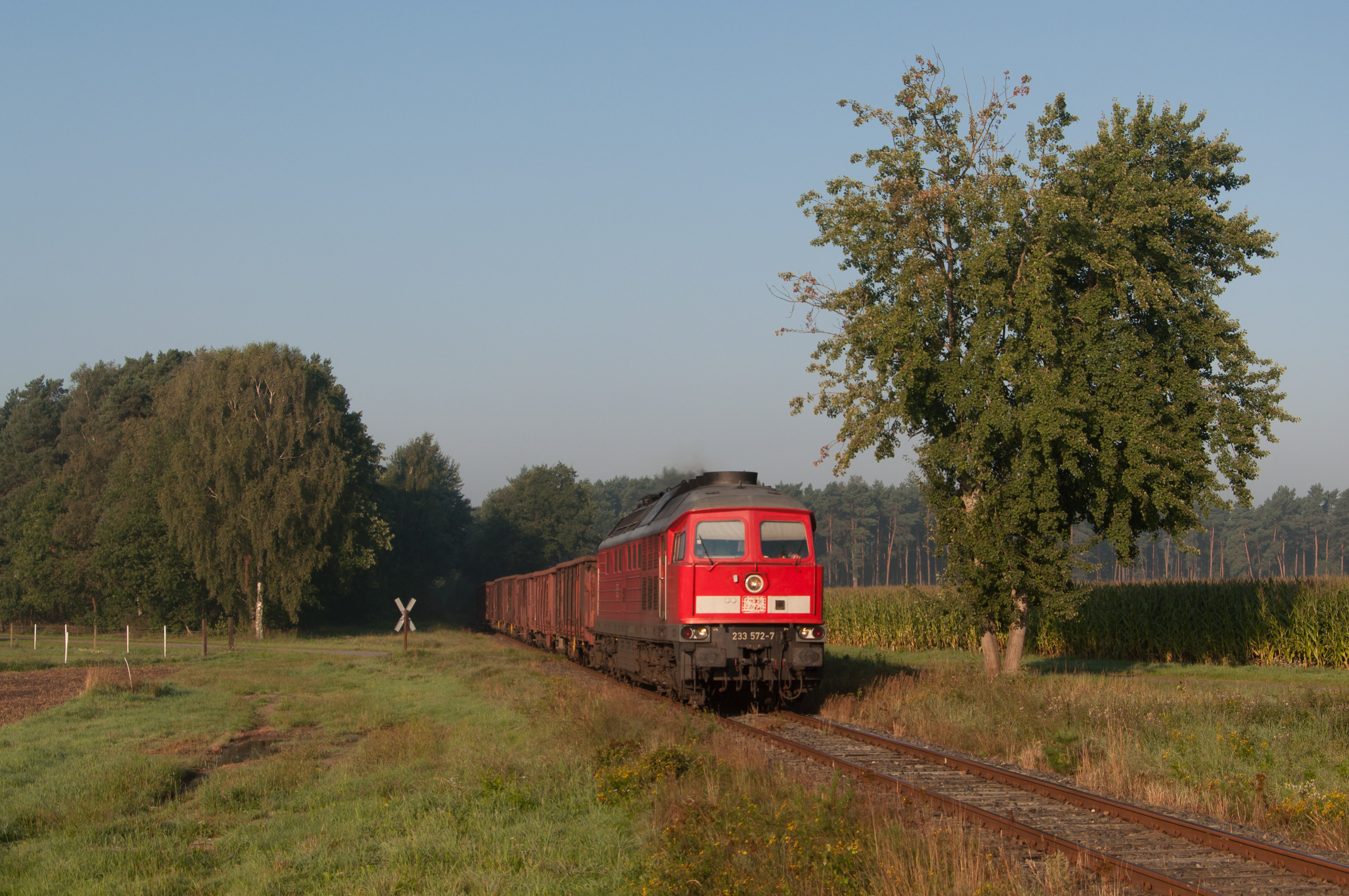
The 233 572-2 between Dedelstorf and Repke.

The Celle–Wittingen railway is a line belonging to the East Hanoverian Railways (Osthannoversche Eisenbahnen or OHE). Because its western portion runs along the River Lachte, it is also known as the Lachte Valley Railway (Lachtetalbahn).

== History ==
After a considerable effort by the Celle–Wittingen Light Railway Company, founded on 21 June 1902, to have a railway from Celle to Wittingen, they were finally able to build the line and begin operating it on 16 August 1904. From 1905 onwards the company also had an operating agreement with the Celle–Bergen Light Railway to use the section of track from Celle Nord–Celle Vorstadt. On 17 June 1909 a new track in Wittingen was taken into service that crossed over the tracks of the Gifhorn–Uelzen railway and ran into the station on the Wittingen-Oebisfelde Light Railway. Trains from Oebisfelde first called here in September. The extension of the Bismark-Gardelegen-Wittingen Light Railway from Diesdorf was also laid into this station on 1 August 1909. On 20 July 1912 the stub line from Beedenbostel to Habighorst was opened to link the planned salt mines of Mariaglück near Höfer and Fallersleben near Habighorst to the network. Initially the desired growth in traffic failed to materialise and it was not until the two pits were amalgamated that demand increased; the transportation of potash developing into the mainstay of the line. Various munition works and a Luftwaffe air base near Dedelstorf generated additional business during the 1930s and in the Second World War.

In 1944 the Celle-Wittingen Light Railway AG was merged with other railway companies into the East Hanoverian Railways (Osthannoversche Eisenbahnen). The OHE has run the line ever since.

After the war traffic picked up again relatively quickly. On workdays it was usual for four passenger trains to work the line and three on Sundays. In the 1950s the number climbed to seven with four on Sundays. From the 1950s crude oil was loaded and transported and, for periods of time, an entire oil train called daily.

In 1959, after a thorough renovation, the maximum permitted speed on the line was raised to 60 km/h. From 1959 passenger trains to Celle called at the Deutsche Bundesbahn station. This simplified connexions. In Wittingen it was possible to transfer directly to the DB station because the stations were next to one another. In addition to workers travelling to the Mariaglück potash mine, excursion traffic was of great importance.

The section from Mariaglück to Habighorst was no longer needed and was lifted in the 1960s. The transport of potash and rock salt transport from Mariaglück ceased in 1970 and 1977 respectively. Thereafter the stub line was mainly used for storage purposes.

For the construction of the Elbe Lateral Canal in 1973 the line between Alt Isenhagen and Glüsingen was rerouted and led over a bridge.

Most of the passenger services were worked by large volume MaK railbuses. The journey time for the Celle–Wittingen line took an average of 75 minutes.

On 25 May 1974 passenger services were withdrawn on the Wittingen–Steinhorst section and the rest of the line from Steinhorst–Celle followed suit on 24 June 1976. The line has since been occasionally used by tourist traffic. The operator of these trains to the mid-1990s was the Brunswick State Museum Railway Company (Brunswickische Landes-Museums-Eisenbahn-Gesellschaft). Today the Lüneburg Railway Society (Arbeitsgemeinschaft Verkehrsfreunde Lüneburg or AVL) operates the Heide Express, which works this and other OHE lines.

At the end of the 1990s crude oil transport ceased. In 1999 the line was re-routed in the area north of Lachendorf, to make way for the expansion of an industrial concern and a new station Lachendorf Nord was built. On 8 November 2005 the section from Beedenbostel to Habighorst was finally closed. Wittinger Hafen is still served today (2022).

== Sources ==
- Gerd Wolff: Deutsche Klein- and Privatbahnen. Band 10: Lower Saxony 2. Zwischen Weser and Elbe. EK-Verlag, Freiburg 2007, S. 259–279, ISBN 978-3-88255-669-8
- Klaus-Peter Sebastian: The Geschichte der Light Railwayen im Isenhagener Land; The OHE-Bahnbetrieb im district Gifhorn. district Gifhorn, Gifhorn 2001, ISBN 3-929632-50-0
- Hans Wolfgang Rogl: The Osthannoverschen Eisenbahnen. 3. Auflage, alba, Düsseldorf 1996, ISBN 3-87094-232-0
