= Beckedorf (disambiguation) =

Beckedorf is the name of several villages in Lower Saxony, Germany:

- Beckedorf in Schaumburg district
- Beckedorf (Celle district), a village in the municipality of Hermannsburg in Lower Saxony
- a village in the parish of Schwanewede in Osterholz district, see: Beckedorf (Schwanewede)
- a village in the parish of Seevetal in Harburg district
