= Aschau =

Aschau may refer to:

- in Germany:
  - Aschau am Inn, a municipality in the district of Mühldorf, Bavaria
  - Aschau im Chiemgau, a municipality in the district of Rosenheim, Bavaria
    - Aschau im Chiemgau station, a railway station
  - Aschau (Lachte), a river of Lower Saxony
- in Austria:
  - Aschau im Zillertal, a municipality in Tyrol
