= Celle–Wittingen Light Railway =

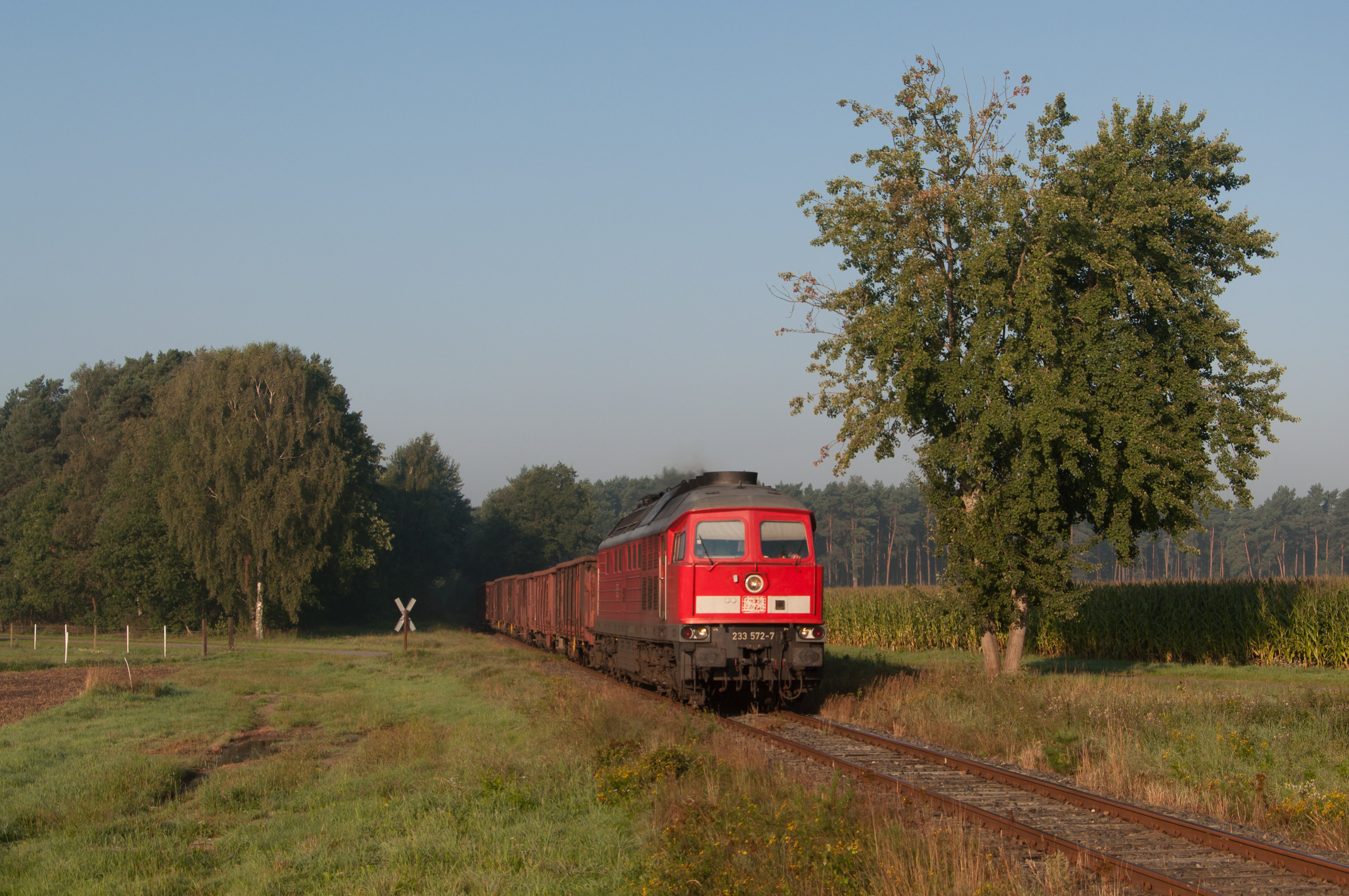
The 233 572-2 between Dedelstorf and Repke.

The Celle–Wittingen Light Railway (German: Kleinbahn Celle–Wittingen) was founded on 21 June 1902 by the Prussian state, the town of Celle and 33 municipalities. On 15 August 1904 it opened the 51 km long, standard gauge line from Celle Stadt (Nord) via Beedenbostel and Hankensbüttel to Wittingen West (now the Celle–Wittingen railway). This line was also called the Lachte Valley Railway (Lachtetalbahn) because part of it ran along the river Lachte. The journey time on the Celle–Wittingen line in 1906 was about 2 hours and 20 minutes. In 1908 the station at Wittingen West was moved to the east side of the state station in order to enable a common station to be created with the Kleinbahn Wittingen-Oebisfelde, opened in 1909, and the Kleinbahn Bismark-Gardelegen-Wittingen, later the Altmärkische Kleinbahn AG. The new route made the construction of embankments and a bridge over the state railway necessary.

From 22 July 1912 the 'Salt Railway' (Salzbahn), a 7 km long branch, ran from Beedenbostel in a northerly direction via Mariaglück to Habighorst, where potash and salt works had been established in two separate locations. But by 1924 Mariaglück had become the terminus for trains on the branch.

The Celle–Wittingen Light Railway had reached an agreement before 1914 to run operations jointly with the Celle-Garßen-Bergen Light Railway. From 1910 this company called itself the Celle-Soltau, Celle-Munster Light Railway GmbH. On 8 November 1940 the Celle–Wittingen Light Railway became a public transport railway.

From 23 February 1940 it was renamed the Celle-Wittingen Railway (Eisenbahn Celle-Wittingen AG). On 27 March 1944 this firm took over the Kleinbahn Celle-Soltau, Celle-Munster GmbH, with which it was already linked as part of the operating group of Celle Light Railways (Celler Kleinbahnen) and was renamed again into the Celle Railways (Celler Eisenbahnen AG).

On 10 July 1944 it was merged into the East Hanoverian Railways (Osthannoversche Eisenbahnen or OHE) along with several other railway companies.

== Sources ==
- Klaus-Peter Sebastian (Herausgeber): Die Geschichte der Kleinbahnen im Isenhagener Land; Der OHE-Bahnbetrieb im Landkreis Gifhorn. Landkreis Gifhorn, Museumsverein Gifhorn e. V. und Heimatverein Brome e. V., Gifhorn 2001, ISBN 3-929632-50-0
- Hans Wolfgang Rogl: Die Osthannoverschen Eisenbahnen. alba-Verlag, Düsseldorf 1996, ISBN 3-87094-232-0
