= Celle–Soltau railway =

Railway line in Germany

Overview
- Line number: 9170
- Locale: Lower Saxony, Germany

Service
- Route number: 159 (1976)

Technical
- Line length: 58.9 km (36.6 mi)
- Track gauge: 1,435 mm (4 ft 8 1/2 in) standard gauge
- Operating speed: 60 km/h (37 mph)

The Celle–Soltau railway is a standard gauge railway in the state of Lower Saxony in northern Germany that belongs to the East Hanoverian Railways (Osthannoversche Eisenbahnen or OHE). It is the OHE's busiest line.

== History ==
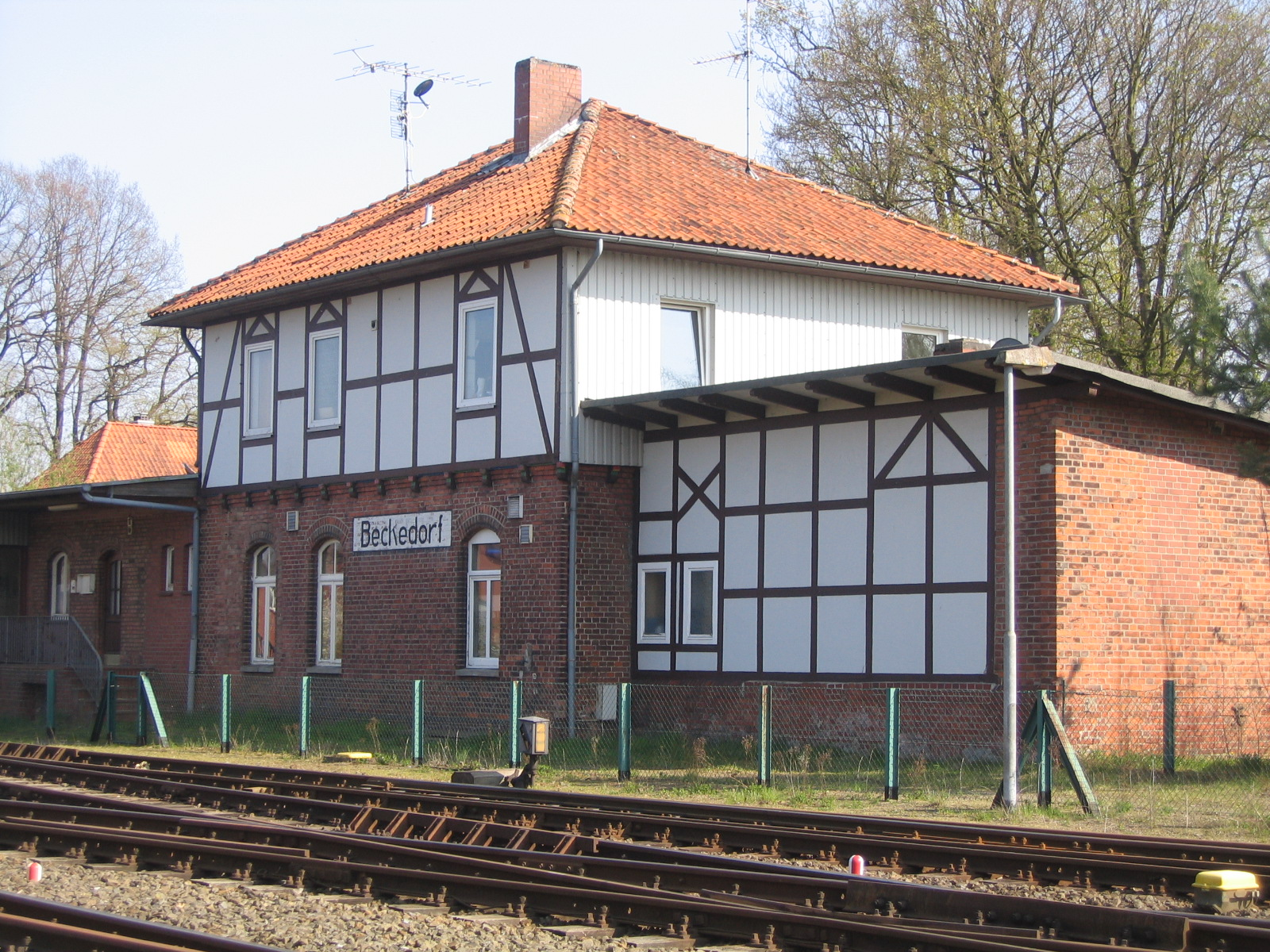
Beckedorf station, now a café

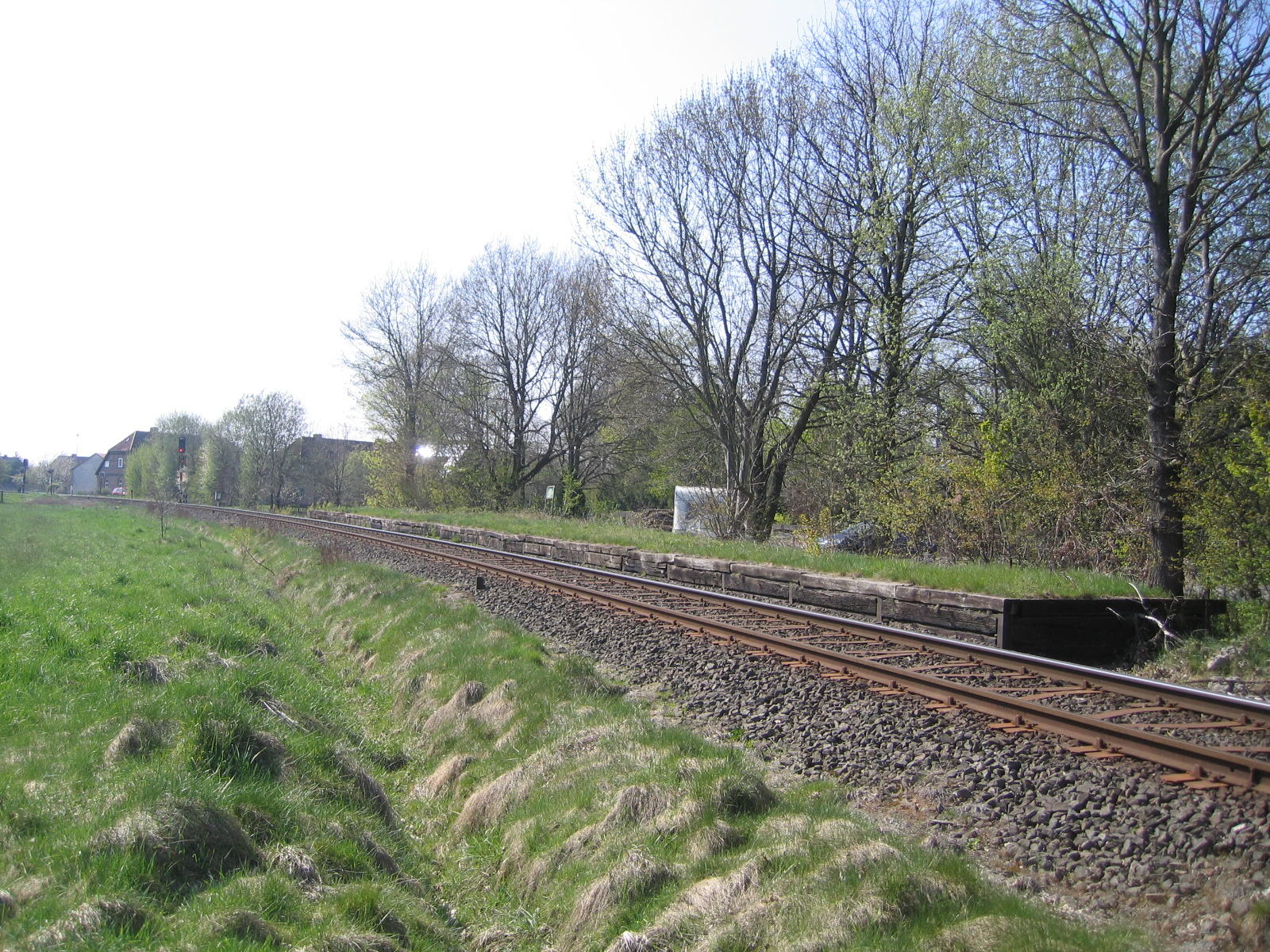
Wohlde, a typical country halt. Earth platform faced with sleepers.

The initiative for the construction of a railway to Bergen came from the district of Celle. The Garßen–Beckedorf–Bergen section was opened on 23 April 1902 by the Kleinbahn Garßen-Bergen. Its terminus had to be at Garßen because they failed to reach agreement with the town of Celle on the route of the line through the town. Following the approval of the Kleinbahn Celle–Wittingen a solution emerged, however, in the shape of junction with that railway. So it was more than two years later, on 13 December 1904, that the line to Celle-Vorstadt on the Celle–Wittingen railway went into service, making through services to Celle possible. As a result, passenger services to Garßen were withdrawn and goods services (which consisted of transfers to the state railway) followed suit on 1 September 1910. However, the railway facilities at Garßen were not finally dismantled until the 1930s.

On 23 April 1910 the line was extended from Bergen to Soltau and also from Beckedorf to Munster. For that purpose a new firm was founded the Kleinbahn Celle-Soltau und Munster, in which the previous owners and the districts of Fallingbostel and Soltau as well as other local authorities participated.

A joint operating agreement was struck with the Kleinbahn Celle-Wittingen.

During Germany's rearmament prior to the Second World War, several sidings were converted to military depots (Scheuen, Bergen). Traffic levels rose sharply as a result. From 1940 the railway no longer ran as a Kleinbahn, but was treated as a public railway; that resulted in a new company Eisenbahn Celle-Soltau, Celle-Munster being set up.

Between 1989 and 1992 large sections of the line were upgraded with Y sleepers superstructure.

In 1969, after the most important intermediate stations had been equipped with electric signal boxes with push-button routing, the line from Celle became remotely controlled using a central block system. This was only the second to be introduced on German railways.

== Services ==
Passenger numbers were quite low in the early years (1904: 69,000 passengers), but climbed following the extension of the line to Soltau and Munster to 250,000 passengers per year. The addition of military trains meant that numbers rose considerably during the First and Second World Wars. At least three to four pairs of trains ran daily, both between Celle and Soltau as well as between Celle and Munster. From 1950 even Eilzug trains ran from Celle via Soltau to Lüneburg. Between 1953 and 1959 there were also passenger trains to the military depot station at Bergen. In 1959 the passenger services were incorporated into the Deutsche Bundesbahn (DB) federal railway station at Celle and in 1961 into the DB station at Soltau, which was better for passengers needing connexions. Railbuses were mainly used towards the end, sometimes with trailer cars. From 1967 busses were also used and, little by little, railway services were reduced. In the 1970s passenger services were withdrawn completely: on 30 May 1975 between Bergen and Soltau, and on 31 May 1976 the rest of the traffic between Celle and Bergen.

The goods trains hauled agricultural products in the main, but the transportation of logs was also important. The only industries were in Celle. Military transportation to the various military installations was also important. Even after the Second World War further military facilities were added and, on many stations, tank-loading ramps were built. Until 1978 the DB also ran goods trains through the line because the distances were shorter than on their own DB lines; towards the end this amounted to 135,000 t per year. In 2006 three goods trains ran on the line each week, as well as ad hoc trains and goods trains hauled by the OHE between DBAG routes.

== See also ==
- East Hanoverian Railways

== Sources ==
- Gerd Wolff: Deutsche Klein- und Privatbahnen. Band 10: Niedersachsen 2. Zwischen Weser und Elbe. EK-Verlag, Freiburg 2007, S. 226–258, ISBN 978-3-88255-669-8
