= Netinera =

German bus and railway company

Netinera Deutschland GmbH
- Company type: GmbH
- Industry: Transport and logistics
- Founded: 2003
- Headquarters: Berlin, Germany
- Key people: Jost Knebel (CEO); Markus Resch (CFO); Alexander Sterr (Labour Director)
- Number of employees: 3,777 (2014)
- Parent: Ferrovie dello Stato Italiane
- Website: www.netinera.de

Netinera (formerly Arriva Deutschland) is a bus and railway company operating in Germany. It is presently a wholly owned subsidiary of the Italian state owned railway company Ferrovie dello Stato Italiane.

It was founded as a subsidiary of British transport company Arriva plc in 2003; Arriva Deutschland quickly expanded its presence via acquisitions, such as the German train operators Prignitzer Eisenbahn and Regentalbahn in 2004, the German bus operator Sippel in 2005, and the rail company Osthannoversche Eisenbahnen in April 2007. As such, within only a few years, Arriva Deutschland was providing both bus and train services across numerous German cities, including Münster, Frankfurt, and Berlin, as well as regional services across Saxony, Bavaria, and the Czech Republic. The company relocated its headquarters numerous times during these early years to better suit the location and scale of its operations.

During 2010, the German state railway operator Deutsche Bahn (DB) agreed terms to purchase Arriva plc; while the acquisition was approved by the European Commission, DB was required to sell on Arriva Deutschland to avoid adversely affecting competition in Germany. While multiple companies expressed interest, including Keolis, Veolia and Ferrovie dello Stato Italiane, it was ultimately sold to a consortium of Ferrovie dello Stato Italiane and the French-Luxembourg investment fund Cube and renamed Netinera during early 2011.

Through the 2010s, Netinera has continued to develop its presence in Germany, such as the establishment of a new subsidiary called Vlexx to operate regional passenger train services in Rheinland-Pfalz, and the winding-down of operations under the Sippel brand. It operates various subsidiaries, including Alex, Enno, Erixx, Die Länderbahn, Metronom, OberpfalzBahn, ODEG, VogtlandBahn, and WaldBahn.

== Bus ==
In 2005, Arriva Deutschland purchased Sippel, a German operator of buses in Frankfurt, Mainz, Wiesbaden and Erlangen. After losing several public contracts, Sippel ultimately ceased operations at the end of 2021.

Arriva went on to buy Verkehrsbetriebe Bils in 2006, which operates buses in Münster, Warendorf and Hamm, and later that same year, it acquired Neißeverkehr which operates buses in the Neiße region. After purchasing a majority stake in Osthannoversche Eisenbahnen (OHE) in April 2007, OHE's bus subsidiaries Cebus in Celle and KVG Bus in Stade also became part of Arriva.

== Rail ==
In 2004, Arriva Deutschland acquired Prignitzer Eisenbahn (PEG), which operated several lines in Germany around Berlin, Brandenburg, Mecklenburg, North Rhine-Westphalia and Pomerania. Since 2012, PEG has mainly functioned as a holding company; among its assets are a 50 percent stake in Ostdeutsche Eisenbahn (ODEG), which operates regional passenger services on various lines in the Northeast of Germany.

During October 2004, it purchased a 77 percent shareholding in Regentalbahn with its subsidiary Vogtlandbahn, which operates regional rail services in southern and eastern Saxony, northern and southern Bavaria, eastern Thuringia as well as parts of the Czech Republic. In 2006, Arriva Deutschland's shareholding was increased to 97 percent.

In April 2007, a company held by Arriva (95.34 %) and Verkehrsbetriebe Bachstein (4.66 %) acquired an 86% stake in the Osthannoversche Eisenbahnen (OHE) with the remaining 14% held by local municipalities. OHE is a majority shareholder in the Metronom Eisenbahngesellschaft which operates regional train services on the Hamburg to Bremen, Hamburg to Hanover, Hanover to Göttingen and Hanover to Wolfsburg lines. Erixx is fully owned by OHE and likewise operating regional passenger train services, albeit on more local lines.

During September 2012, Netinera ordered 63 Alstom Coradia Lint diesel multiple-units; these were ordered to be used on regional passenger train services in Rheinland-Pfalz under the umbrella of a new subsidiary called Vlexx. Operations started in December 2014 and were extended in December 2020. For 2016, it was reported that DB's share of domestic regional passenger services had declined, largely due to the impact made by competing private companies such as Netinera.

In 2021, Netinera announced that it would launch two tenders for the supply of up to 90 train sets, comprising a mix of battery electric multiple units (BEMUs) and electric multiple units (EMUs), to be operated by its various subsidiary operations across Germany. During July 2023, the company was selected as one of the future operators of the Leipzig S-Bahn system.

== Corporate affairs ==
Upon its founding in 2003, Arriva Deutschland was initially headquartered in Hamburg. Following the acquisition of Regentalbahn in 2004, the company's seat was located to Regentalbahn's head office at Viechtach in Bavaria. In the following years, many administrative and management positions were located in Berlin, where the company headquarters were officially moved to in early 2023.

During April 2010, German state railway operator Deutsche Bahn (DB) submitted a takeover offer for Arriva Plc valued at £7.75 per share (£1.585 billion). Following a review of the proposed acquisition, the European Commission ruled that, in order to comply with competition rules, DB would have to discard Arriva's German operations. Keolis, Veolia and Ferrovie dello Stato Italiane openly expressed their interest in buying the business. In January 2011, it was sold to a consortium comprising Ferrovie dello Stato Italiane, holding a 51 percent of the shares, and the French-Luxembourg investment fund Cube, holding the remaining 49 percent. Shortly thereafter, it was renamed Netinera.

In February 2019, it was reported that Cube intended to sell its stake in Netinera and would soon be approaching other potential infrastructure investors. During December 2020, Ferrovie dello Stato Italiane purchased Cube's shareholding in the business, making it a wholly owned subsidiary.
