= Lachte =

River in Germany

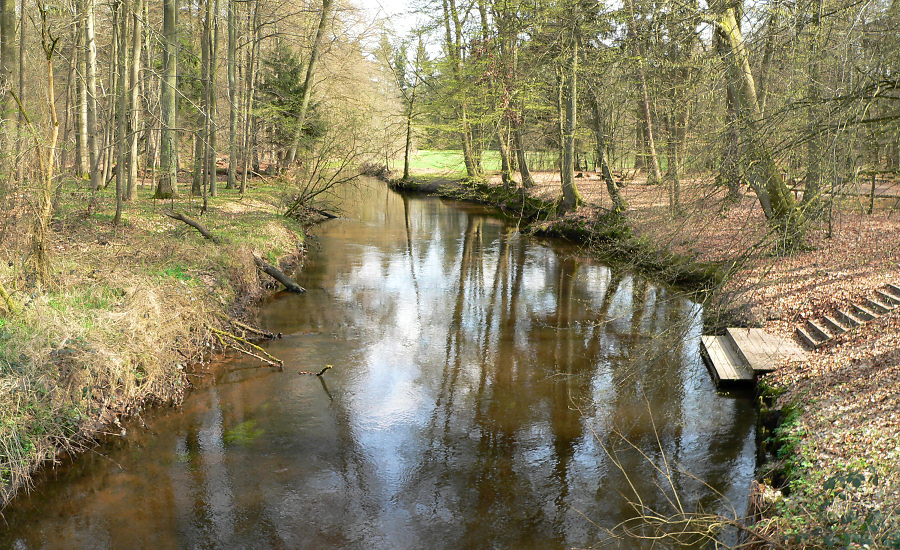
- The Lachte west of Lachendorf

Location
- Country: Germany
- State: Lower Saxony

Physical characteristics
- Source
  - location: Southwest of Sprakensehl
  - coordinates: 52°44′40″N 10°28′09″E
  - elevation: 96 m (315 ft)
- Mouth
  - location: East of Celle, near Lachtehausen (part of Altenhagen)
  - coordinates: 52°37′17″N 10°06′11″E
  - elevation: 40 m (130 ft)
- Length: 38.0 km (23.6 mi)
- Basin size: 494 km^{2} (191 sq mi)

Basin features
- Progression: Aller→ Weser→ North Sea
- Landmarks: Villages: Auermühle, Lüsche (part of Steinhorst), Steinhorst, Wohlenrode (part of Eldingen), Hohnhorst (part of Eldingen), Jarnsen (part of Lachendorf), Beedenbostel, Lachendorf, Lachtehausen (part of Altenhagen)
- Tributaries
  - left: Kainbach, Jafelbach
  - right: Lutter, Aschau

The Lachte (German pronunciation: [ˈlaxtə]) is a 38-kilometre-long (24 mi) right-hand tributary of the Aller in the Südheide Nature Park in the north German state of Lower Saxony.

== Course ==
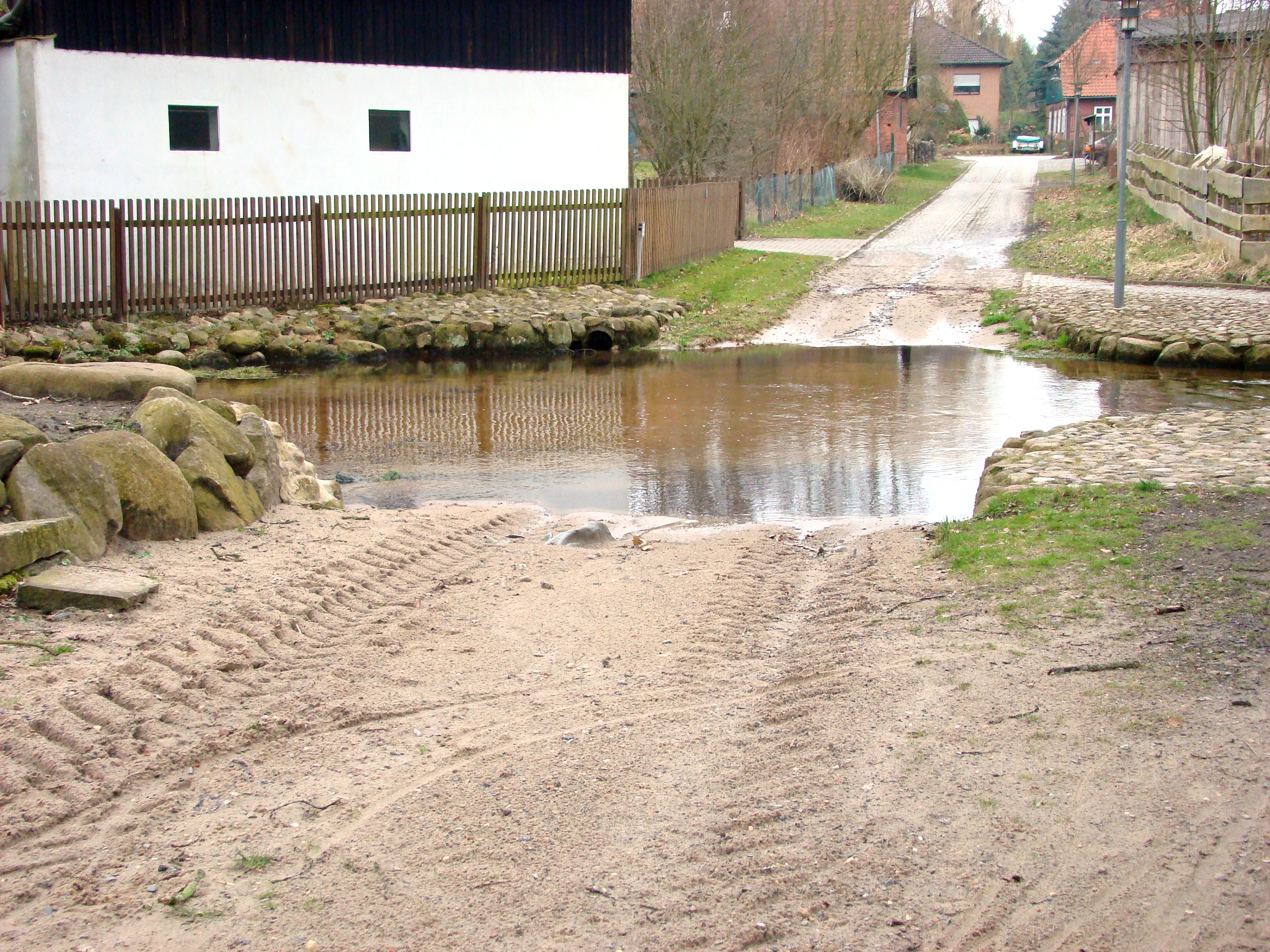
Ford across the Lachte at Steinhorst

The Lachte river rises in the northern part of the district of Gifhorn southwest of Sprakensehl. It initially flows southwest, feeds at 5 km (3.1 mi) long row of fish ponds near the Auermühle Estate (Gut Auermühle) and is then joined from the left by the Kainbach stream and, beyond the town of Steinhorst (which has a water wheel in its coat of arms), the Jafelbach. In Steinhorst a stony ford crosses the river. Near Beedenbostel, Celle district, the Lutter and the Aschau join the Lachte from the right. Near Lachendorf the river swings west and discharges into the Aller near Lachtehausen (part of Altenhagen), a village within Celle district.

In 1997 the "Upper Lachte, Kainbach, Jafelbach" Nature Reserve was opened with an area of 1,090 hectares (2,700 acres). The Lachte and the Lutter with their tributaries, which both run through the eastern part of the Südheide Nature Park, form a river system with numerous branches that covers an area of about 2,450 hectares (6,100 acres) and was designated a nature reserve (Naturschutzgebiet) in 2007.

Although only following the western section of the river, the narrow gauge line from Celle to Wittingen was known as the Lachte Valley Railway.

== See also ==
- List of rivers of Lower Saxony
