= Beckedorf–Munster railway =

Railway line in Germany

Overview
- Line number: 9172

Service
- Route number: ex 211h

Technical
- Line length: 23.9 km
- Track gauge: 1435 mm
- Operating speed: 60 max.

The standard gauge Beckedorf–Munster railway in north Germany is owned by the East Hanoverian Railways (German: Osthannoverschen Eisenbahnen or OHE).

== History ==
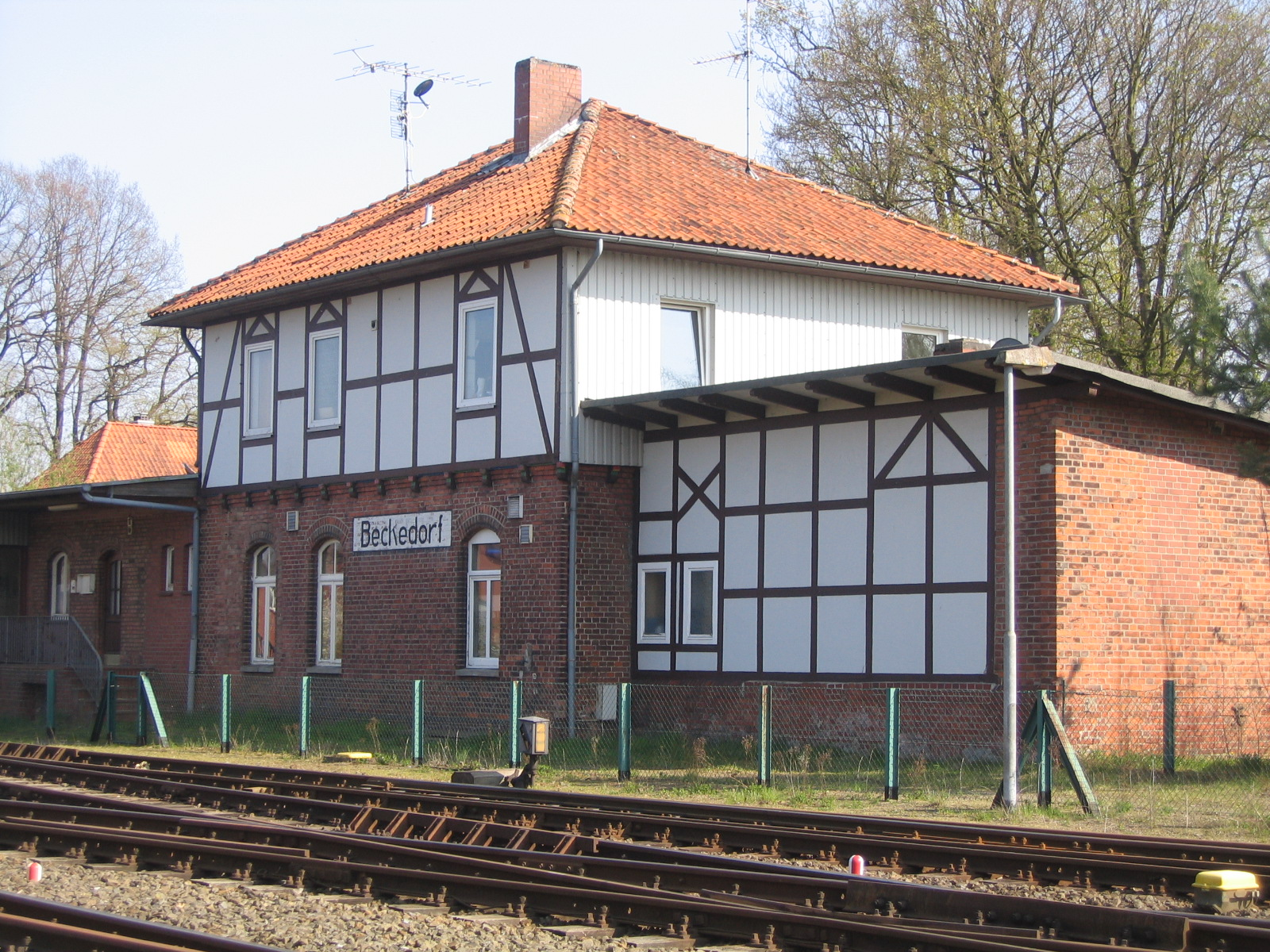
Beckedorf station, now a café

The line was built by the Celle-Soltau, Celle-Munster Light Railway Company (Kleinbahn Celle-Soltau, Celle-Munster GmbH). It was intended as a branch of the Celle–Soltau railway that had been opened in 1902 as far as Bergen. On 23 April 1910 the latter was extended from Bergen to Soltau and at the same time the line from Beckedorf to Munster was opened.

In the beginning it was a line that opened up and served the rural communities.

As Germany re-armed prior to the Second World War several sidings to military bases (Poitzen, Munster) were built and, as a result, traffic grew appreciably. From 1940 the line was no longer treated as a light railway (Kleinbahn), but as a railway for public transport, as was expressed in the name of the new firm, the Celle-Soltau, Celle-Munster Railway (Eisenbahn Celle-Soltau, Celle-Munster).

== Traffic ==
Passenger volumes climbed steadily to begin with and the branch contributed significantly to numbers on the Celle–Soltau line. As a result of military trains the numbers during the First and Second World Wars rose markedly. At least three to four pairs of trains ran daily between Celle and Munster, and there were additional trains between Beckedorf and Munster that had connexions in Beckedorf to Celle. Towards the end, railbuses dominated the passenger services, sometimes supplemented by a trailer. From 31 May 1965 Deutsche Bundesbahn (DB) services began running to Munster and the OHE station was closed as a consequence. From 1967 buses replaced some of the trains. Passenger services were withdrawn during the 1970s: on 30 May 1970 between Hermannsburg and Munster and the rest between Beckedorf (Celle) and Hermannsburg on 31 May 1976.

Freight trains mostly carried agricultural produce and even the transportation of logs played a role. Military traffic to the various sidings of military installations was also important. After World War II still more military facilities were added and tank-loading ramps were built at several stations. The railway played as special part during the Berlin Blockade in 1948/49 because RAF Fassberg was one of the start points for the airlift. Huge quantities of freight had to be dispatched daily and the airfield were supplied by goods trains including coal trains.

Today goods trains only run on request.

== Sources ==
- Gerd Wolff: Deutsche Klein- und Privatbahnen. Band 10: Niedersachsen 2. Zwischen Weser und Elbe. EK-Verlag, Freiburg 2007, S. 226–258, ISBN 978-3-88255-669-8
