= Altenhagen (Celle) =

- Ortsteil of Celle
- Interactive map of Altenhagen
- Location within Germany Location within Lower Saxony
- Coordinates: 52°37′58″N 10°06′52″E
- Country: Germany
- State: Lower Saxony
- District: Celle
- Town: Celle
- Elevation: 47 m (154 ft)

Population (2020-12-31)
  - Total: 869
- Time zone: UTC+01:00 (CET)
  - Summer (DST): UTC+02:00 (CEST)
- Postal codes: 29223
- Dialling codes: 05141

Altenhagen has been a municipality in the borough of Celle in northern Germany since 1973. It lies on the northeastern edge of the town. The original village dates back to 1377.

The area is divided into a new industrial estate and the old village by the B 191 federal road that runs from Celle to Eschede and Uelzen. The industrial estate includes a post office distribution centre. The railway line from Celle to Wittingen runs past the edge of Altenhagen, but the station at Altenhagen has rarely been used since it was closed to passenger services.

The centre of the old village is characterised by several rural farmyards and a number of handicraft firms. There is also a kindergarten and the local community hall for the parish of Celle's town church. On the northeastern edge of the village is a large vocational college campus which incorporates two training schools (Berufsbildende Schulen), BBS I and BBS IV, and known as the Albrecht Thear School.

== Politics ==
The village council has common responsibility for the Celle districts of Altenhagen, Bostel and Lachtehausen. The chairman (Ortsbürgermeister) is Helmut Schmidt.
