= Celle-Soltau, Celle-Munster Light Railway =

The Celle-Soltau, Celle-Munster Light Railway (German: Kleinbahn Celle-Soltau, Celle-Munster GmbH) was until 1908 a publicly owned company run by the district of Celle in North Germany and was originally named the Garßen–Bergen Light Railway (Kleinbahn Garßen-Bergen).

It was the builder and operator of the Celle–Soltau railway and its branch line from Beckedorf to Munster.

The initiative to build a railway to Bergen came from Celle district, who opened the first section from Garßen via Beckedorf to Bergen on 23 April 1902. The terminus had to be built at Garßen because no agreement could be reached with the town of Celle about the routing of the line within the town limits. With the permission of the Celle–Wittingen Light Railway a solution was found in the shape of a junction on their line. It was more than two years later, on 13 December 1904, that direct services from Bergen to Celle became possible when the line to Celle-Vorstadt on the Celle–Wittingen railway was opened. As a result, passenger trains no longer stopped at Garßen and goods trains (transferred to the state railway) followed suit on 1 September 1910. The railway facilities in Garßen were not dismantled until the 1930s.

In 1905 joint operations were agreed with the Celle-Wittingen Light Railway.

On 23 April 1910 the railway was extended from Bergen to Soltau and from Beckedorf to Munster. Two years earlier, in 1908 the Celle–Soltau, Celle–Munster Light Railway had been founded as a GmbH, supported by the district of Celle, the Kingdom of Prussia, the Province of Hanover and the districts of Fallingbostel and Soltau, the town of Celle and several villages along the line.

During Germany's re-armament prior to the Second World War several sidings were built to serve military bases (Scheuen, Bergen) which caused a sharp rise in traffic. From 1940 the line was no longer handled as a light railway but as a public railway due to standardisation of the Reich's regulations. This was reflected in the company's new name: the Celle-Soltau, Celle–Munster Railway (Eisenbahn Celle-Soltau, Celle–Munster).

On 1 March 1944 a merger agreement with the Celle-Wittingen Railway went into force to form the new company of Celle Railway Company (Celler Eisenbahn AG); this was merged in turn on 10 July 1944 into the East Hanoverian Railways (Osthannoversche Eisenbahnen).

The lines are still working today.

== Sources ==
- Gerd Wolff: Deutsche Klein- und Privatbahnen. Band 10: Niedersachsen 2. Zwischen Weser und Elbe. EK-Verlag, Freiburg 2007, S. 226–258, ISBN 978-3-88255-669-8
