= Eberhard Schlotter =

German painter

Eberhard Schlotter (3 June 1921 – 8 September 2014) worked as an international painter in Spain and Germany. He is the brother of the sculptor Gotthelf Schlotter (1922–2007).

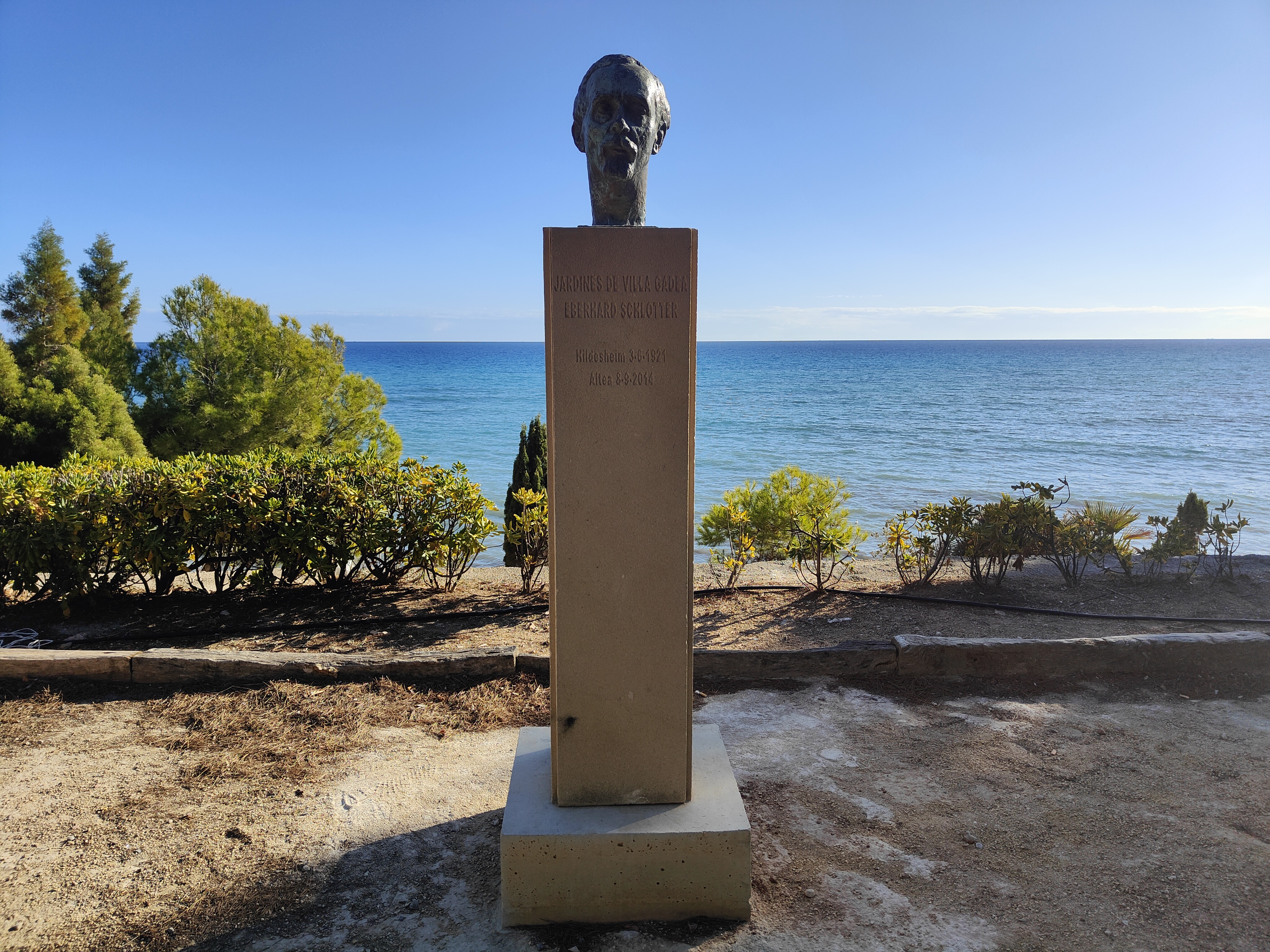
Commemorative bust of Eberhard Schlotter in the gardens of Villa Gadea in Altea

Schlotter was born in Hildesheim, eldest son of the sculptor Heinrich Schlotter, was private at the Second World War, studying later on in Munich. In 1955, he made acquaintance with Arno Schmidt - which resulted in many pictures of the famous novelist and the village he lived in, Bargfeld. He died in 2014 at Altea, Alicante, Spain.
