= NiedersachsenBahn =

Railway company

NiedersachsenBahn GmbH
- Industry: Railway
- Headquarters: Celle, Germany
- Products: Railway operations
- Services: Operating company for metronom Eisenbahngesellschaft
- Owner: Osthannoversche Eisenbahnen AG (60%), Eisenbahnen und Verkehrsbetriebe Elbe-Weser GmbH (40%)

NiedersachsenBahn GmbH is a railway company (EVU) which acts as an operating company for metronom Eisenbahngesellschaft. It is a joint venture of the private Osthannoversche Eisenbahnen AG (OHE) (60%) from Celle, Germany and the state-owned Eisenbahnen und Verkehrsbetriebe Elbe-Weser GmbH (EVB) (40%) from Zeven, Germany. The company is also based in Celle.
