= Garßen =

- Stadtteil of Celle
- Interactive map of Garßen
- Location within Germany Location within Lower Saxony
- Coordinates: 52°39′33″N 10°07′47″E
- Country: Germany
- State: Lower Saxony
- District: Celle
- Town: Celle
- Elevation: 57 m (187 ft)

Population (2020-12-31)
  - Total: 2,764
- Time zone: UTC+01:00 (CET)
  - Summer (DST): UTC+02:00 (CEST)
- Postal codes: 29229
- Dialling codes: 05086

Garßen is a Lower Saxon village in the southern part of the Lüneburg Heath and, since 1973, part of the borough of Celle in Germany. It lies on the northeastern side of the town.

== History ==
The name of the village is derived from Gersnethe (1248). Historically Garßen was part of the parish of Groß Hehlen. On 1 January 1973 Garßen lost its independence and was incorporated into the borough of Celle.

The village is separated into an old and a new area by the B 191 federal road which runs from Celle to Eschede and Uelzen. Whilst the new area consists mainly of new houses, in the old part there are several farms and old buildings.

== Politics ==
The head of the parish council (Ortsbürgermeister) is Dr. Michael Bischoff (CDU).

== Culture and points of interest ==
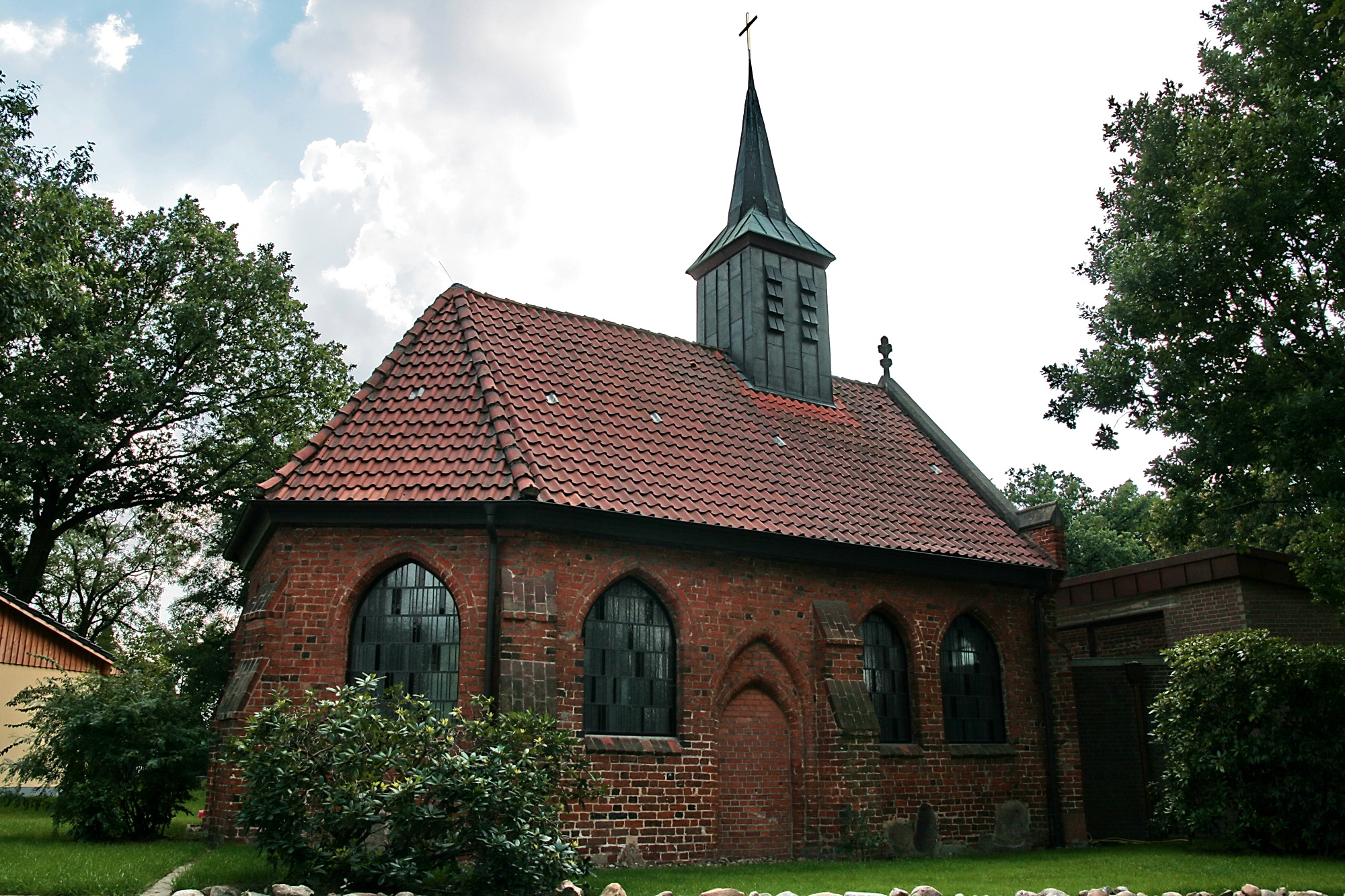
St Mark's Church dating to the middle of the 14th century

The centrepiece of the old village is St Mark's Church (Markuskirche), which was built in the middle of the 14th century. Next to the church is the primary school and the special education school. In addition there is a kindergarten in Garßen and a large hypermarket as well as several small craft shops.

Garßen is also known for its sports club, the Sportverein SV Garßen Celle, which under the short name of SVG Celle had an unbroken run since 1998 in the Women's 2nd Handball Division (North) in Germany and, in 2009, was promoted to the 1st Division.

In addition there has been a golf course on the eastern edge of the village for several years on the road to Lachendorf.
