= Osthannoversche Eisenbahnen =

German transport company

Osthannoversche Eisenbahnen OHE
- Industry: Rail
- Headquarters: Celle, Germany
- Key people: Wolfgang Birlin, Chairman of the Board; Piers Marlow, Chairman of the Supervisory Board
- Products: Transport and logistics
- Number of employees: 1231 (2004), 1262 (2005), 1252 (2006)
- Parent: Netinera
- Website: www.ohe-transport.de

The Osthannoversche Eisenbahnen AG (OHE) is a Celle based transportation company with railway network in North-eastern Lower Saxony around the Lüneburg Heath area of over 250 km.

The OHE's main business is the transportation of freight through their own routes as well as the network of the Deutsche Bahn.

Historically the company also operated passenger trains, which completely ended in 1977 after previous partial closures. After the de-monopolisation of the German railways in the 1990s the company re-entered the rail passenger market through the company NiedersachsenBahn which has a large stake in the company metronom

In March 2007 the OHE became majority owned by Arriva Deutschland.

== History ==
=== Formation ===
In 1944 the OHE arose from the merger of several companies from the northeast area of Lower Saxony, its creation was not purely for economic reasons, but also being politically favourable to the national socialist Gau Osthannover government.

The company was formed on 10 July 1944 from a number of small railways previously under the management of the Niedersächsisches Landeskleinbahnamt (LKA):

- Celler Eisenbahnen AG - formed in March 1944 from the merger of two companies:
  - Eisenbahn Celle-Wittingen AG; before 1940 the Kleinbahn Celle-Wittingen (CW) (established 1904)
  - Eisenbahn Celle-Soltau, Celle–Munster; before 1940 known as the Kleinbahn Celle-Soltau-Munster GmbH (CSM) before 1910 known as the Kleinbahn Garßen-Bergen (first established 1902)
- Winsener Eisenbahn GmbH - formed in 1933 from the merger of two companies:
  - Kleinbahn Winsen–Niedermarschacht
  - Kleinbahn Winsen–Evendorf–Hützel (WEH)
- Lüneburg-Bleckeder Eisenbahn GmbH formed from the Bleckeder Kleinbahn GmbH (BI.KB) in September 1943.
- Lüneburg-Soltauer Eisenbahn formed in 1943 from the Kleinbahn Lüneburg-Soltau GmbH (founded 1913)
- Kleinbahn Soltau–Neuenkirchen (founded 1920)

Additionally the Kleinbahn Wittingen-Oebisfelde (KWOe) was also incorporated on the same day. The new company Osthannoverschen Railways AG 1944 had routes of 340 km total length: it was for decades the largest of the non-federal railways of Germany

At its founding in 1944 the main shareholders were the Prussian State and the Province of Hanover with 53% of the shares combined, the districts of Celle, Fallingbostel, Gifhorn, Harburg and Lüneburg also had owned shares. By the end of 2006 the OHE was still state-owned with 40.2% held by the state of Lower Saxony and 33.8% by the German state

In July 2006 the German state, the state of Lower Saxony and DB Regio AG decided to sell their shares as part of a privatisation process. The successful bidder was Arriva-Bachstein GmbH; a consortium made up of Arriva (86%) and Verkehrsbetriebe Bach Stein GmbH (14%), with an offer of 30million Euros, and various supplementary promises, subject to regulatory and parliamentary approval.

Shareholders as of 2008 were: Arriva Bachstein GmbH - 85.118%, Celle council - 5.615%, Gifhorn council - 3.224%, Lüneburg council- 2.178%, Soltau-Fallingbostel council- 2.160%, City of Celle - 1.187%, City of Wittingen - 0.468%, Flecken Brome - 0.050%

== Rail network ==
Route	Length km	Name	Notes
Celle–Soltau	58.9	Falkenberg Railway	
Beckedorf–Munster	23.9	Örtze Valley Railway	
Lüneburg Süd–Soltau	57.1	Hill Railway (Gebirgsbahn)	
Lüneburg Nord–Bleckede	23.0	Geestrand Railway	Separated from the rest of OHE by the tracks of DBAG
Winsen (Luhe)–Hützel	41.1	Luhe Railway	
Winsen (Luhe)–Marschacht	16.0	Elbe Marsh Railway	
Celle–Wittingen	51.0	Lachte Valley Railway	
Without connection to the main network
Wunstorf–Mesmerode	6.0		Since 2000; the former Steinhuder Meer-Bahn StMB

Decommissioned and closed routes:

Route	Length km	Name	Notes
Soltau–Neuenkirchen	12.0		1996 closed, 2006 completely eliminated
Beedenbostel–Mariaglück	5.6	Salt Line (Salzbahn)	2005 closed
Marschacht–Niedermarschacht	1.1	Elbe Marsh Railway	1996 closed
Radenbeck–Oebisfelde	43.1	Ohre Valley Railway	14.2 km Witttingen Radenbeck section closed, on offer to other railway companies until 2009; the later sections to Oebisfelde have been shut down since 1945: Rühen–Oebisfelde 1945, Radenbeck–Rühen 1983 : closed
Celle–Wietzenbruch	4.3		prior to 1998 part of Deutsche Bahn. 2005 closed, 2006 dismantled

The network is open to other rail companies, the OHE offers cheaper track access charges for through workings than for trains starting or ending on its own tracks.

== Operations ==
=== Rail freight ===
The transportation of freight has always been an important part of the railway: in 2006 1.4 million of materials were transported, including wood, other construction materials, chemicals and fertilizers and military equipment for the military training grounds at Munster and Bergen. The relative amounts of freight were : wood 47%, chemicals/oil 17%, aggregates/building materials 16%, container 8%, other 7%, military 4%. As a railway company OHE transported in 2006 Germany 1.6 million tonnes (2005: 0.95 million tons) with unit train loads being the main type of transport.

The OHE also operates in partnership with the Deutsche Bahn.

=== Passenger ===
Passenger work on OHE lines was at its peak at the very beginning of the companies history. In the subsequent decades a few passenger routes were shut, by the 1970s many remained but by 1977 all had closed:

1 July 1945: Rühen–Oebisfelde 22 May 1955: Beedenbostel–Mariaglück (works transport remained until 1958) 28 May 1961: Soltau–Neuenkirchen 22 May 1966: Winsen–Niedermarschacht 31 May 1970: Hermannsburg–Munster (Lager) und Salzhausen–Hützel 3 June 1973: Bleckede–Alt Garge 26 May 1974: Steinhorst–Wittingen und Wittingen–Rühen Horst 5 July 1974: Winsen–Salzhausen 1 June 1975: Bergen–Soltau 26 June 1975: Soltau–Hützel–Schwindebeck 30 May 1976: Celle Nord–Bergen und Beckedorf–Hermannsburg 23 June 1976: Celle Nord–Steinhorst Celle 22 May 1977: Lüneburg–Bleckede und Lüneburg–Schwindebeck

As a replacement for the rail closures the OHE ran bus services instead.

Through the subsidiary NiedersachsenBahn GmbH (60% owned with a 40% stake from Eisenbahnen und Verkehrsbetriebe Elbe-Weser (EVB) ) the OHE became involved in rail passenger transport once again with the company metronom which has operated since 2003 on the tracks of the Deutsche Bahn. Maintenance of metronom vehicles is carried out at the OHE owned works at Uelzen

=== Heritage traffic ===
Through the Arbeitsgemeinschaft Verkehrsfreunde Lüneburg e.V. (AVL) ("Association of friends of Lüneburg transport eV") the Heide-Express is run on the OHE network with rolling stock from yesteryear.

=== Management of other railway lines ===
With the dissolution of the Niedersächsisches Landeseisenbahnamt (NLEA) in 1959 the OHE' (along with the Bentheimer Eisenbahn) took over some of the operations of the railway companies previously managed by the NLEA:

- Bremervörde-Osterholzer Eisenbahn GmbH (BOE) (until 1980, now managed and part of the Eisenbahnen und Verkehrsbetriebe Elbe-Weser (EVB) )
- Buxtehude-Harsefelder Eisenbahn GmbH (BHE) (since July 1993 managed by Eisenbahnen und Verkehrsbetriebe Elbe-Weser)
- Eisenbahn Gittelde-Bad Grund GmbH (decommissioned 30 December 1971)
- Lüchow-Schmarsauer Eisenbahn GmbH (LSE) (until 30 March 1969, subsequently self managed)
- Niederweserbahn GmbH (NWB) (decommissioned 26 September 1964)
- Steinhuder Meer-Bahn GmbH (StMB) (acquisition of the remaining rail operations by the OHE in March 2000)
- Wilstedt-Zeven-Tostedter Eisenbahn GmbH (WZTE) (until 1980 : in 1982 the company merged with the Bremervörde-Osterholzer Eisenbahn GmbH to form the Eisenbahnen und Verkehrsbetriebe Elbe-Weser)

Since 1995 workings on the Rinteln-Stadthagener Verkehrs GmbH (RStV) have been operated by the OHE, the Verkehrsbetriebe Grafschaft Hoya was managed by OHE between 1993 and 2001. (The operations subsequently taken over by the WeserBahn GmbH)

In addition, the operation of the 15 km long railway line from Bomlitz to Walsrode (Bomlitz–Walsrode railway) is operated by the OHE for the benefit of Dow Wolff Cellulosics

== Subsidiaries ==
In addition to the company metronom and its main rail transport business the OHE operates a number of subsidiaries - mostly symbiotic to its main operational mode:

- Kraftverkehr Osthannover GmbH (KOG) - a road transport business established 1973.
- Kraftverkehr Celle Stadt und Land GmbH (KVC) - a shareholder of Cebus GmbH & Co. KG, operator of coach transport.
- Osthannoversche Umschlagsgesellschaft mbH (OHU) - provides storage and handling facilities at the ports of Hafen Wittingen on the Elbe Lateral Canal
- Uelzener Hafenbetriebs- und Umschlags-GmbH (UHU) - Operates the port of Uelzener Hafen on the Elbeseitkanal.
- Unikai Hafenbetrieb Lüneburg GmbH - Operates the port of Hafen Luneberg
- Verkehrsbetrieb Osthannover GmbH (VOG) - A bus route operator with over 50 vehicles operating in the counties of Soltau-Fallingbostel, Luneberg und Harburg of northeast Lower Saxony

== Rolling stock ==
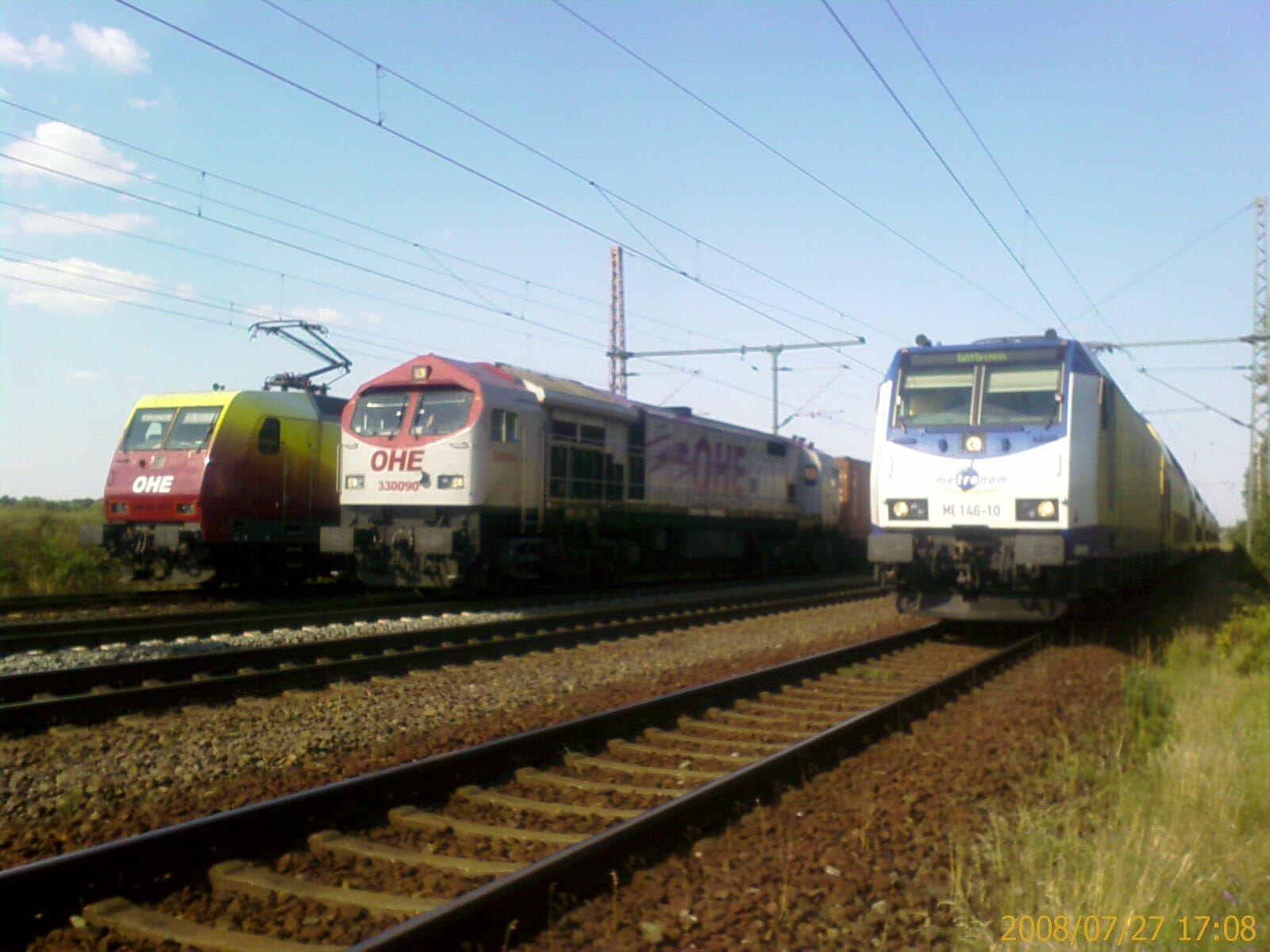
OHE TRAXX, Blue Tiger and metronom EuroSprinter locomotives. (left to right)

A variety of steam locomotives were inherited from the predecessor companies. Between 1946/49 22 steam locomotives of the Deutsche Reichsbahn (Classes 55, 56, 75.6, 76, 91, 92) were acquired to meet the demands of the increased traffic on its lines; they were operated under their old class names (but with new serial numbers); at the same time the existing locomotives were given new designations: Three locomotives were classified as Series 89, four as a 92. Additionally 13 railcars were used on the OHE, inherited from predecessor companies, including four Wismar railbuses. Between 1954 and 1959 seven large MaK locomotives and some Esslingen railbuses were acquired. In 1965, the last steam engine retired.

The OHE operates a fleet of 30 diesel locomotives of various types; from small shunters, to the giant diesel locomotives of the AdTranz Blue Tiger family. Whilst previously the 'connecting rod' MaK diesel locomotives were the backbone of the fleet, the company now makes use of articulated B'B' locomotives from MaK such as the MaK G 1202, G 1204 and G 1205, additionally three original 1600 hp G 1600 locomotives are still in use, and a further two similar locomotives of lower power.

A notable set of three locomotives are the extensively modified "DH 1504" DB Class 216 types (see Class V 160 variants) - OHE designation 2000 85, 2000 86 and 2000 87. Another 'attraction' are the 'Blue Tiger' locomotives - which replaced the Deutz diesel locomotives of type DG 2000 CCM

Many of the locomotives have been modernized and equipped with new engines, radio control etc.

For mainline route service, the OHE uses the DH 1504 (2000 hp), the Bombardier DE AC33C (3300 hp) as well as three locomotives of the EuroRunner type (Siemens ER 20) (2700 HP) In the late 2000s four Vossloh G2000 BB (3000 hp) and one Vossloh G1700 BB (2300 hp) have also been leased.

In addition, several electric locomotives of the Bombardier Traxx family are operated.

== References and notes ==
=== Literature ===
- Hütter, Bretschneider, Uhl, Kasper: Vom Kleinbahnnetz zu den Osthannoverschen Eisenbahnen. Verlag Kenning, Nordhorn 1997, ISBN 3-927587-71-0
- Hans Wolfgang Rogl: Die Osthannoverschen Eisenbahnen. Alba, Düsseldorf 1996, ISBN 3-87094-232-0

=== Sources ===
- Official website
- Private website about the OHE - Information on history, rolling stock and track network of the OHE. Also photographic galleries by region bahnbetriebswerk-13.de
- Private website about the OHE - History, stock lists, photographs, information on models produced of OHE rolling stock kdtroeger.de
