= Wittingen-Oebisfelde Light Railway =

German railway company

The Wittingen-Oebisfelde Light Railway (German: Kleinbahn Wittingen–Oebisfelde) was a railway company in Germany that operated passenger and goods trains on the 43 kilometre long Wittingen–Oebisfelde railway.

== History ==
The Wittingen–Oebisfelde Light Railway opened its line from Wittingen to Brome on 15 September 1909 and, on 20 November of the same year, to the terminus at Oebisfelde Nord, the last section of which lay in the Prussian Province of Saxony (today Saxony-Anhalt). By 1843 it had drawn up plans to build a link from Uelzen via Brome to the southeast. Initially, however, the Uelzen–Wittingen–Gifhorn line was built. This route lay entirely on the territory of the Kingdom of Hanover, whilst the line to Oebisfelde ran to Prussia. In 1900 after plans to build a state railway line came to nothing, there were attempts to found a light railway or Kleinbahn. Its sponsors were the numerous local parishes, other regional bodies such as the Kingdoms of Prussia and Hanover and the Brunswick Land as well as several private investors. The reason for the railway was the requirement to transport agricultural produce and goods. Farmers promised themselves lower transportation costs for the delivery of fertilizer in a region with few fertile soils. That would, in turn, increase yields which the railway could dispatch.

In 1909 operations began with four steam locomotives from the firm of Borsig hauling passenger and goods trains. The station at Wittingen West was also used from the outset by the Celle–Wittingen Light Railway and the Altmärkische Light Railway. In 1924/25 a steam engine was procured from Hanomag in Hanover.

The high workload of the route is evinced, for example, by figures from the year 1928. That year six locomotives hauled 100,000 passengers and about 125,000 tonnes of freight. In 1933 and 1938 two railbuses were bought. In 1939 on three pairs of trains ran on the line each day. In addition there was a Kleinbahn Bus on the Brome–Wittingen section.

In 1944 the company was merged into the East Hanoverian Railways (Osthannoversche Eisenbahnen) along with several other firms.

In 2008 the line from Wittingen to Rühen largely still exists.

== Sources ==
- Klaus-Peter Sebastian (Herausgeber): Die Geschichte der Kleinbahnen im Isenhagener Land; Der OHE-Bahnbetrieb im Landkreis Gifhorn. Landkreis Gifhorn, Museumsverein Gifhorn e. V. und Heimatverein Brome e. V., Gifhorn 2001, ISBN 3-929632-50-0
- Hans Wolfgang Rogl: Die Osthannoverschen Eisenbahnen. alba-Verlag, 3. Auflage, Düsseldorf 1996, ISBN 3-87094-232-0
- Gerd Wolff: Deutsche Klein- und Privatbahnen. Band 10: Niedersachsen 2. Zwischen Weser und Elbe. EK-Verlag, Freiburg 2007, S. 280–295, ISBN 978-3-88255-669-8
