= Scharnhorst, Lower Saxony =

Scharnhorst
- Ortsteil of Eschede
- Interactive map of Scharnhorst
- Location within Germany Location within Lower Saxony
- Coordinates: 52°43′N 10°17′E
- Country: Germany
- State: Lower Saxony
- District: Celle
- Municipality: Eschede

Area
  - Total: 15.84 km^{2} (6.12 sq mi)
- Elevation: 78 m (256 ft)

Population (2012-12-31)
  - Total: 679
  - Density: 42.9/km^{2} (111/sq mi)
- Time zone: UTC+01:00 (CET)
  - Summer (DST): UTC+02:00 (CEST)
- Postal codes: 29348
- Dialling codes: 05142
- Vehicle registration: CE

Scharnhorst is a village and a former municipality in the district of Celle, in Lower Saxony, Germany. Since 2014, it has been a part of the municipality Eschede. Its postal code is 29384.
