= Habighorst =

- Ortsteil of Eschede
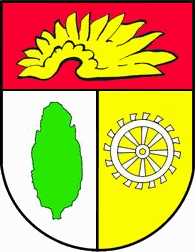
- Coat of arms
- Interactive map of Habighorst
- Location within Germany Location within Lower Saxony
- Coordinates: 52°42′N 10°14′E
- Country: Germany
- State: Lower Saxony
- District: Celle
- Municipality: Eschede

Area
  - Total: 15.84 km^{2} (6.12 sq mi)
- Elevation: 61 m (200 ft)

Population (2012-12-31)
  - Total: 748
  - Density: 47.2/km^{2} (122/sq mi)
- Time zone: UTC+01:00 (CET)
  - Summer (DST): UTC+02:00 (CEST)
- Postal codes: 29359
- Dialling codes: 05142
- Vehicle registration: CE

Habighorst is a village and a former municipality in the district of Celle, in Lower Saxony, Germany. Since 1 January 2014, it is part of the municipality Eschede.
