= Bargfeld =

Hamlet in Lower Saxony, Germany

- Village
- Location of Bargfeld in Lower Saxony
- Coordinates: 52°42′08″N 10°20′46″E
- Country: Germany
- State: Lower Saxony
- District: Celle
- Municipality: Eldingen
- First mentioned: 1065
- Incorporated: January 1, 1973

Population (2011)
  - Total: 132
- Postal code: 29351
- Area code: 05148

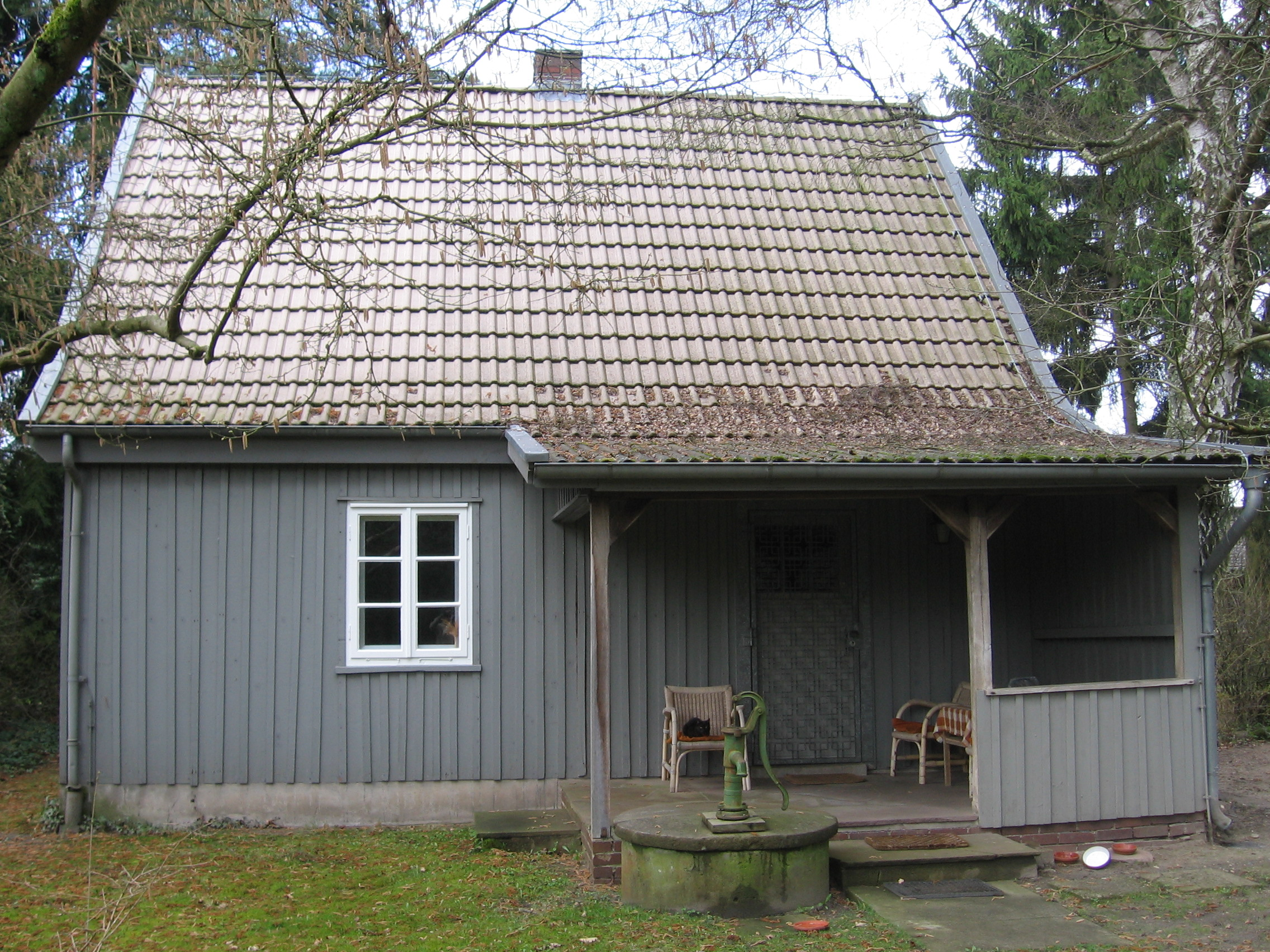
Arno Schmidt's house at Bargfeld

Bargfeld is a hamlet of about 190 inhabitants near Celle in Lower Saxony, Germany, documented since 1065, now belonging to the village municipality Eldingen.

It has become famous for the many novels and stories the German author Arno Schmidt set there, he having lived in Bargfeld from 1958 until his death in 1979. The Arno Schmidt Stiftung is located in Bargfeld.

== History ==
The village of Bargfeld was first mentioned in historical records in 1065. Since January 1, 1973, it has been part of the political municipality of Eldingen, and together with it belongs to the joint municipality (Samtgemeinde) of Lachendorf in the district of Celle.

At the southern edge of the village center stands a linden tree that is more than 400 years old. Bargfeld lies within the Südheide Nature Park.

From 1953 to 1967, Bargfeld had its own elementary school (Volksschule).

Founded in 1891, the Club Einigkeit Bargfeld holds its annual "Faslam" festival every February. It is a multi-day celebration featuring a costumed parade throughout the village and various other social events. Each late autumn, the volunteer fire department at Bargfeld (Freiwillige Feuerwehr Bargfeld), established in 1934, organizes the Bargfeld torch and lantern procession with local music. The fire department is part of the district fire service unit of Celle.

== See as well ==
- Eberhard Schlotter
- Gotthelf Schlotter
