= Beedenbostel =

- Municipality
- Coat of arms

- Location of Beedenbostel within Celle district
- Interactive map of Beedenbostel
- Location within Germany Location within Lower Saxony
- Coordinates: 52°39′N 10°15′E
- Country: Germany
- State: Lower Saxony
- District: Celle
- Municipal assoc.: Lachendorf

Government
  - Mayor: Ulrich Lange (CDU)

Area
  - Total: 12.58 km^{2} (4.86 sq mi)
- Elevation: 54 m (177 ft)

Population (2025-12-31)
  - Total: 963
  - Density: 76.6/km^{2} (198/sq mi)
- Time zone: UTC+01:00 (CET)
  - Summer (DST): UTC+02:00 (CEST)
- Postal codes: 29355
- Dialling codes: 05145
- Vehicle registration: CE
- Website: www.beedenbostel.de

Beedenbostel (German pronunciation: [beːdn̩ˈbɔstl̩]) is a municipality in the district of Celle, in Lower Saxony, Germany.
