= Eschede =

- Municipality
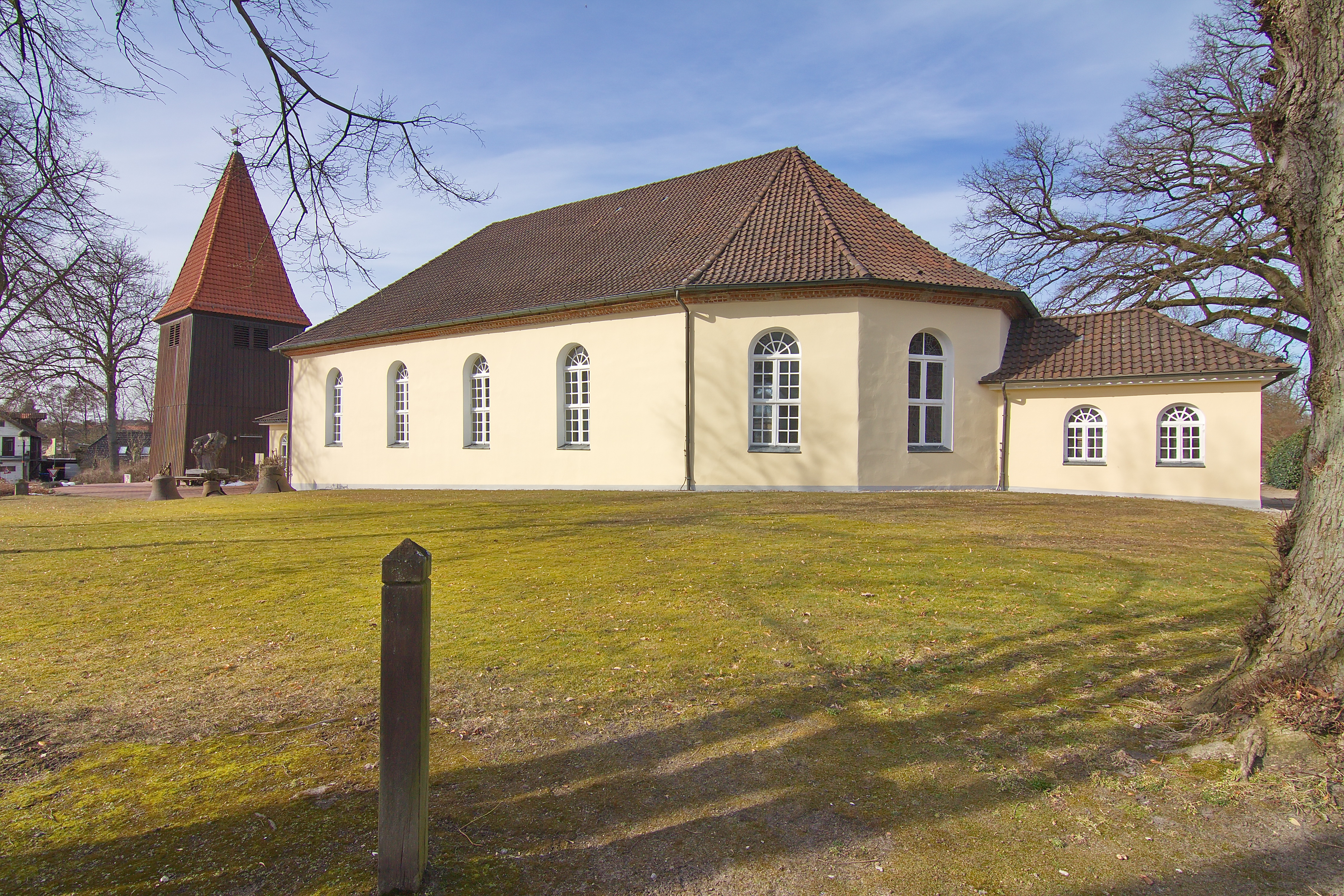
- St. John’s Church

- Coat of arms

- Location of Eschede within Celle district
- Interactive map of Eschede
- Location within Germany Location within Lower Saxony
- Coordinates: 52°44′N 10°15′E
- Country: Germany
- State: Lower Saxony
- District: Celle
- Municipal assoc.: Eschede

Government
  - Mayor (2021–26): Heinrich Lange (Ind.)

Area
  - Total: 196.77 km^{2} (75.97 sq mi)
- Elevation: 87 m (285 ft)

Population (2025-12-31)
  - Total: 5,365
  - Density: 27.27/km^{2} (70.62/sq mi)
- Time zone: UTC+01:00 (CET)
  - Summer (DST): UTC+02:00 (CEST)
- Postal codes: 29348
- Dialling codes: 05142
- Vehicle registration: CE
- Website: www.eschede.de

Eschede (German pronunciation: ['ɛʃədə]) is a municipality in the district of Celle, in Lower Saxony, Germany. Situated approximately 15 km (10 miles) northeast of Celle, Eschede lies at the border of the Südheide Nature Park, a protected area of large forests and heaths. Today around 20 small villages are part of the "Gemeinde Eschede".

In 1975, the largest forest fire in the history of Germany destroyed vast tracts of forests in the area. The place is also known for the 1998 Eschede train disaster, in which an ICE 1 train crashed, killing 101 and making it the worst German rail accident since the Second World War.

The painter Albert König (1881–1944) was born in Eschede, and the "Albert-König-Museum" can be visited in Unterlüß nearby.

Eschede was the seat of the former Samtgemeinde ("collective municipality") of Eschede.

== Notable people ==
- Wilhelm Brese (1896–1994), German politician (DNVP, CNBL, CDU), was chairman of the savings and loan association in Eschede and was leader of the church council in Eschede
- Erich Schell House (1901–1983), German civil servant and politician (NSDAP, later GB / BHE, GDP, CDU), lived after the war in the rectory in Eschede
- Goede Gendrich (1912–2000), German forester and author
- Hans-Hubertus Bühmann (1921–2014), German forestry and Lower Saxony state politician (CDU), was a board member of the forestry association and Eschede Samtgemeinde mayor of the municipality Eschede
- Ernst Bauerochse (born 1925), German missionary and church representatives, went to school in Eschede

== Sister town ==
- Barneville-Carteret, Manche, Normandy, France
