= Brunau (Örtze) =

River in Lower Saxony, Germany

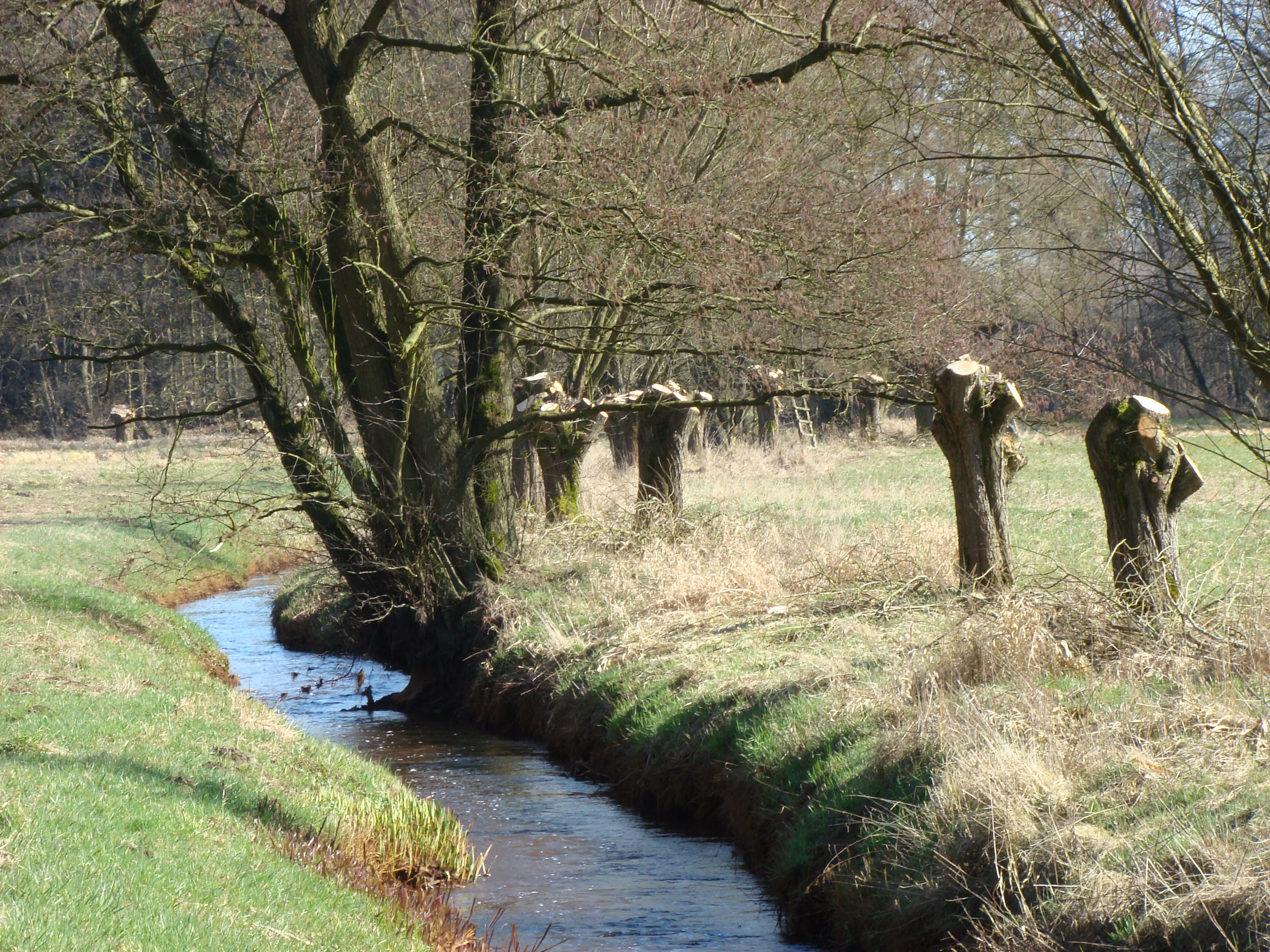
- Pollarded willows along the Brunau near Bonstorf

Location
- Country: Germany
- State: Lower Saxony

Physical characteristics
- Source
  - location: east of Nindorf
  - coordinates: 52°50′29″N 9°59′20″E
  - elevation: 71 m above sea level (NN)
- Mouth
  - location: northeast of Baven into the Örtze
  - coordinates: 52°50′57″N 10°06′06″E
  - elevation: 52 m above sea level (NN)
- Length: 11.0 km (6.8 mi)

Basin features
- Progression: Örtze→ Aller→ Weser→ North Sea
- Landmarks: Villages: Nindorf, Hetendorf (belongs to Südheide), Bonstorf
- Tributaries
  - left: Süllbach

The Brunau (German pronunciation: [ˈbʁuːnaʊ]) is a 11.0-kilometre (6.8 mi) long stream of Lower Saxony, Germany, in the district of Celle, on the Lüneburg Heath.

== Source and course ==
The Brunau rises in the vicinity of Nindorf, flows initially northeast to south of Hetendorf (a district of Südheide). Here it swings east, runs past Bonstorf to the north and then continues in a southeastern direction. North of the village of Baven the stream is dammed. Originally it powered a water mill here, the Backebergsmühle, a water-driven corn mill. The Brunau flows right under the building. Shortly before its mouth the Brunau merges with an old, now overgrown, meadow-irrigation channel. With this channel it discharges into the Örtze near Baven north of Hermannsburg.

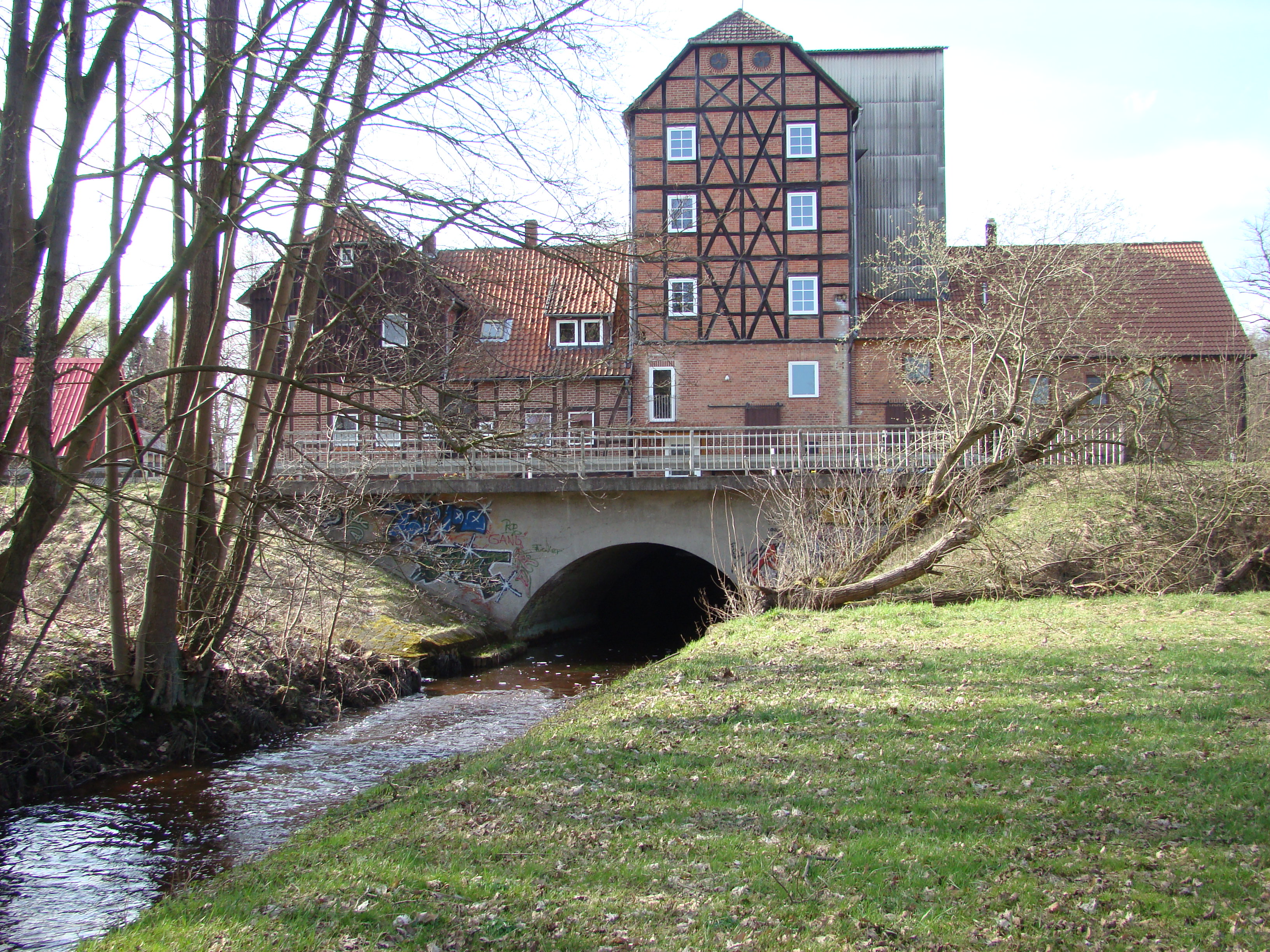
The Brunau near the Backeberg mill

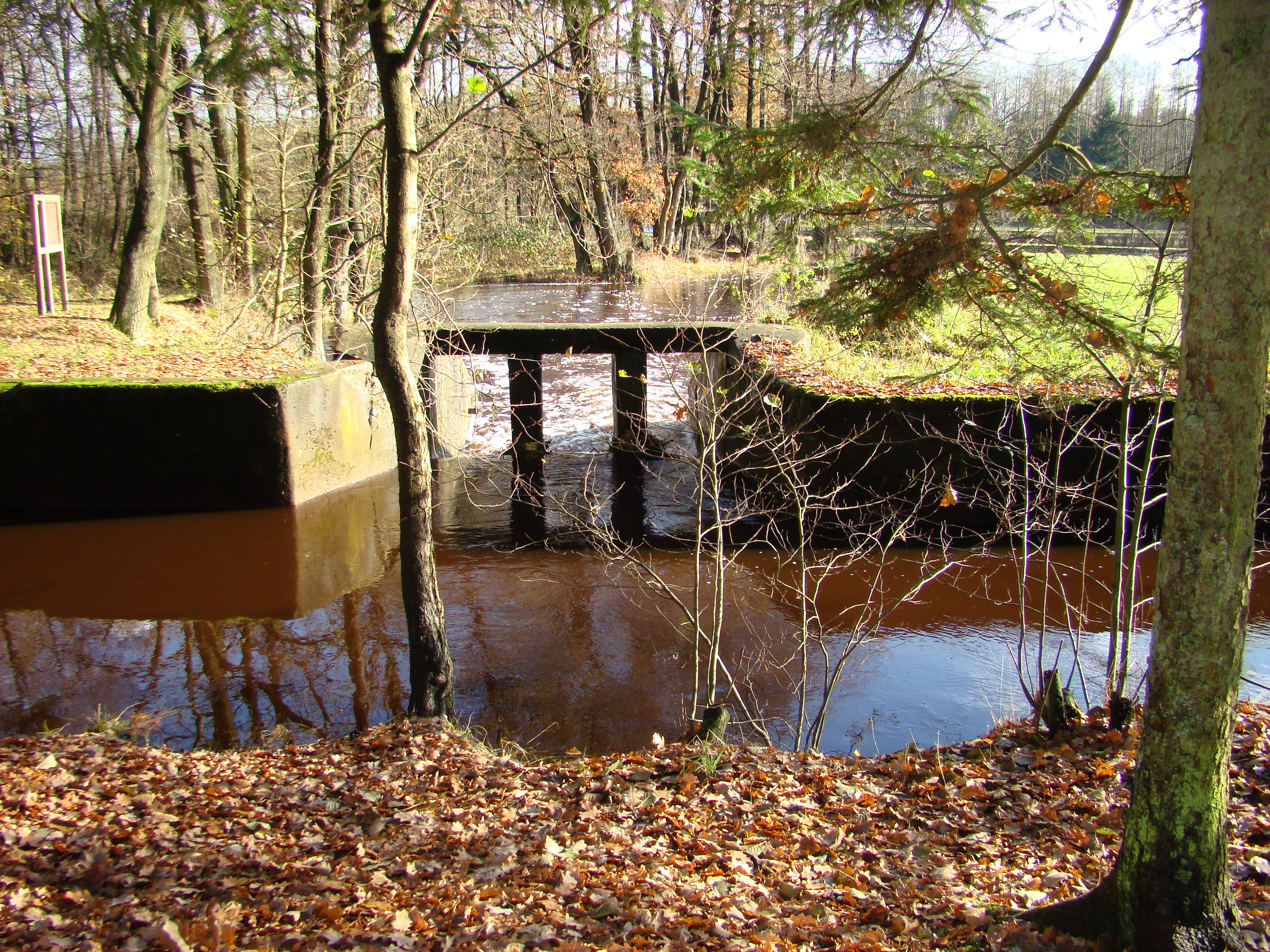
Old sluice on the Örtze. Right: the Brunau; left: the old meadow irrigation channel

== Water quality ==
The Brunau derives its name from its brown (Low German: bruun) water. Its quality however is Class II throughout: moderately polluted.

== See also ==
- List of rivers of Lower Saxony
