= Baven =

- Ortsteil of Südheide
- Interactive map of Baven
- Location within Germany Location within Lower Saxony
- Coordinates: 52°50′39″N 10°4′49″E
- Country: Germany
- State: Lower Saxony
- District: Celle
- Municipality: Südheide

Population
  - Total: 1,638
- Time zone: UTC+01:00 (CET)
  - Summer (DST): UTC+02:00 (CEST)
- Postal codes: 29320
- Dialling codes: 05052

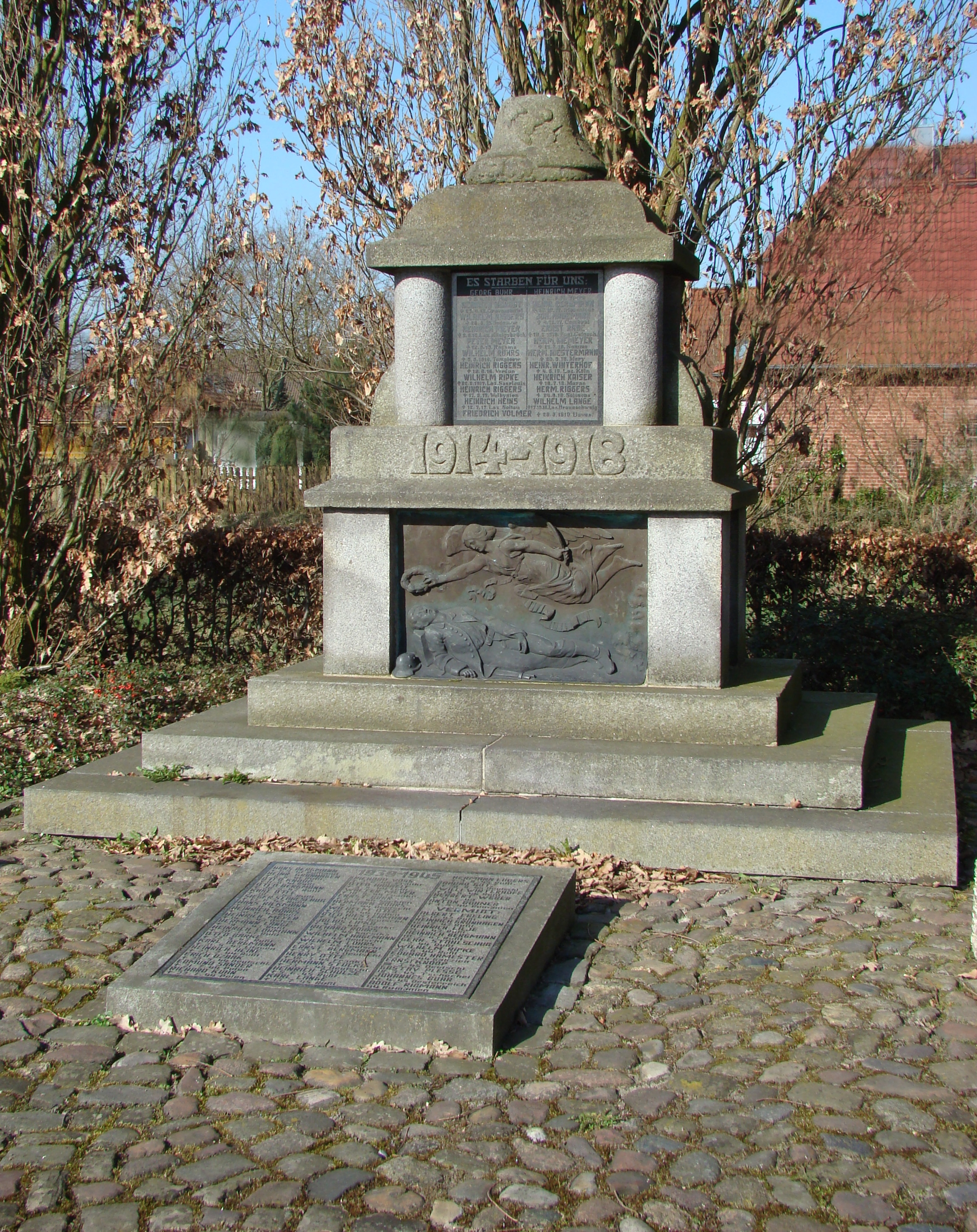
1914–1918 and 1939–1945 war memorial

Baven is a village in the municipality of Südheide in the north of Celle district in Lower Saxony, Germany. It lies on the western edge of the Südheide Nature Park, on the Lüneburg Heath and currently has a population of 1,638.

There is evidence that the first settlements here go back to the Bronze Age. Until the 19th century Baven consisted of 15 farmsteads, before the sale and division of an estate (Hofstelle) made new land available and the number of inhabitants rose markedly. In 1973 Baven was incorporated into the municipality of Hermannsburg as part of the regional and administrative reform in Lower Saxony. Hermannsburg became part of Südheide in 2015.

Just north of the village a small stream, the Brunau feeds into the river Örtze.

== Bibliography ==
- Matthias Blazek: 100 Jahre organisiertes Feuerlöschwesen in Baven 1907–2007. Hermannsburg 2007 ISBN 978-3-00-019848-9
- Hartmut Rißmann (editor): Bavener Dorf-Chronik. Hermannsburg 1995
- Gerhard Röhrs (editor): Chronik Baven. Hermannsburg 1993

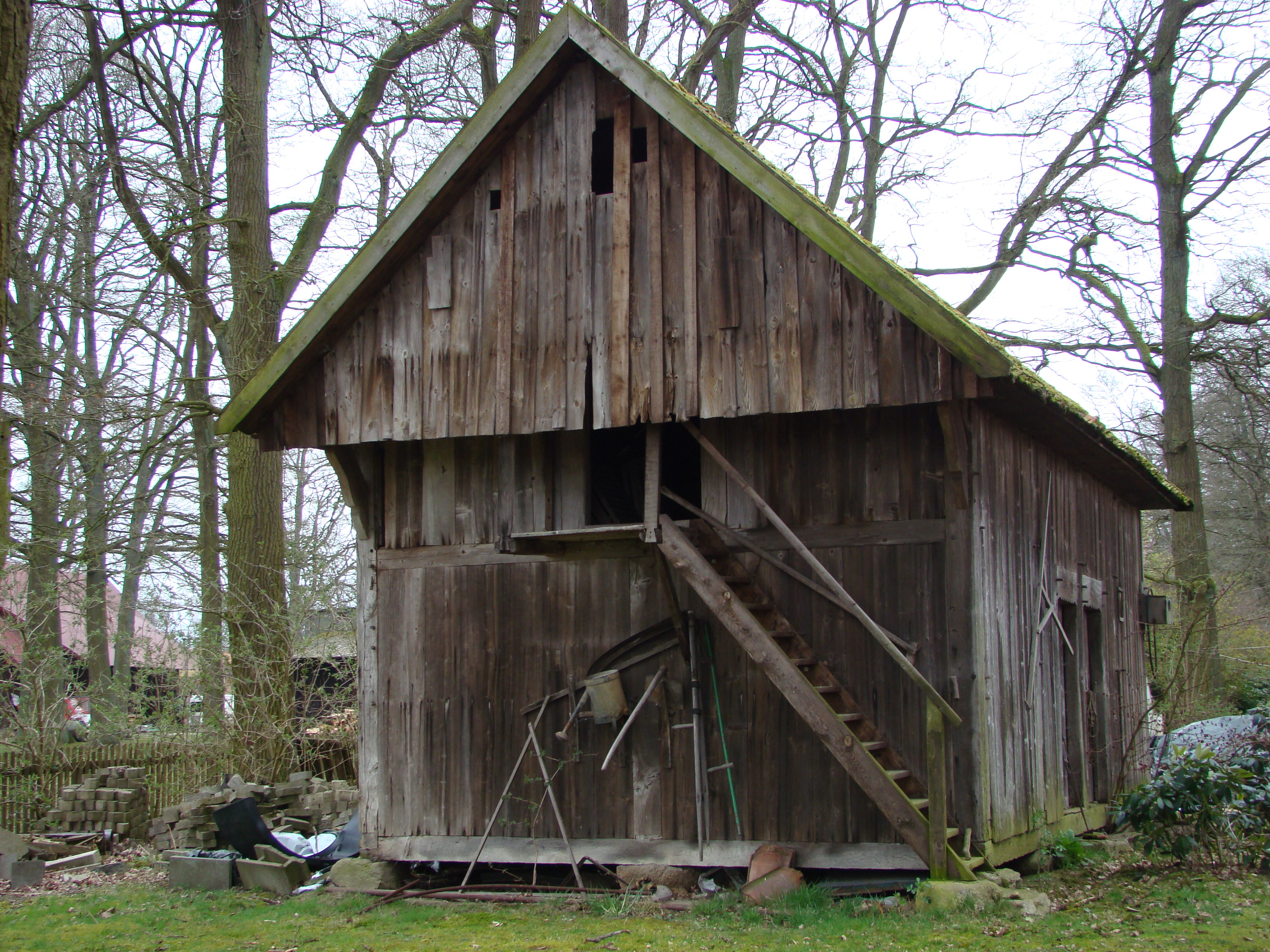
Treppenspeicher dating to 1767
