= Bonstorf =

- Ortsteil of Südheide
- Interactive map of Bonstorf
- Location within Germany Location within Lower Saxony
- Coordinates: 52°51′43″N 10°2′54″E
- Country: Germany
- State: Lower Saxony
- District: Celle
- Municipality: Südheide
- Elevation: 68 m (223 ft)

Population
  - Total: 530
- Time zone: UTC+01:00 (CET)
  - Summer (DST): UTC+02:00 (CEST)
- Postal codes: 29320
- Dialling codes: 05052

Bonstorf (German pronunciation: [ˈbɔnstɔʁf]) is a village in the municipality of Südheide in the north of Celle district on the Lüneburg Heath in central Germany.

Bonstorf lies about 3 km from Hermannsburg on the boundary with the district of Soltau-Fallingbostel and currently has about 530 inhabitants. In 1973 it was incorporated into the municipality (Einheitsgemeinde) of Hermannsburg as part of the Lower Saxon regional and administrative reform. Hermannsburg was merged into Südheide in 2015. The hamlets of Barmbostel and Hetendorf belong to Bonstorf.

Near the village are the Bonstorf Barrows, the remains of a Neolithic or Early Bronze Age burial site.

Bonstorf lies on the small stream, the Brunau, which discharges north of Hermannsburg into the Örtze. The village is primarily agricultural in character and its appearance is dominated by farmhouses as well as a relatively large car dealership.

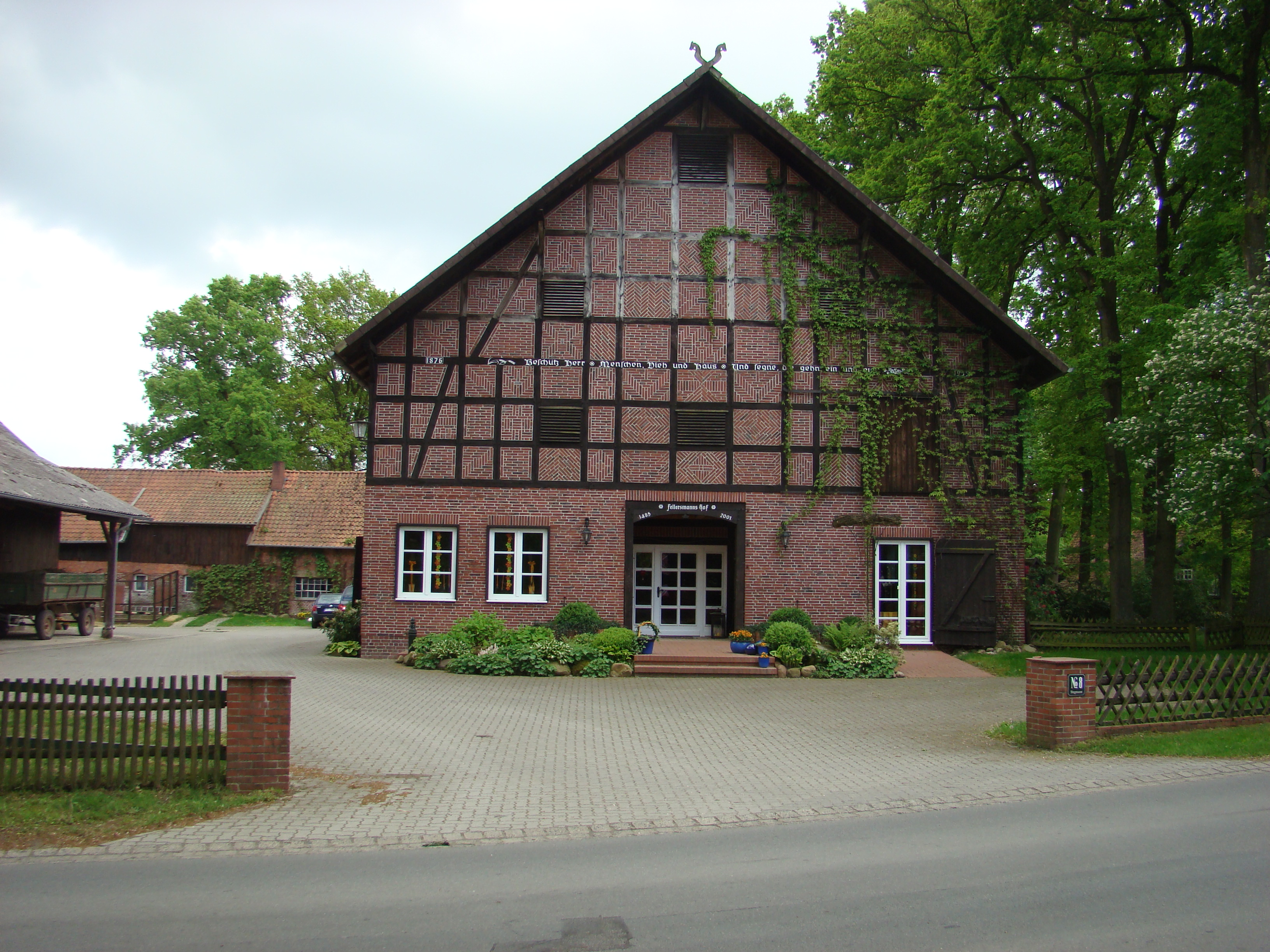
Farm in Bonstorf

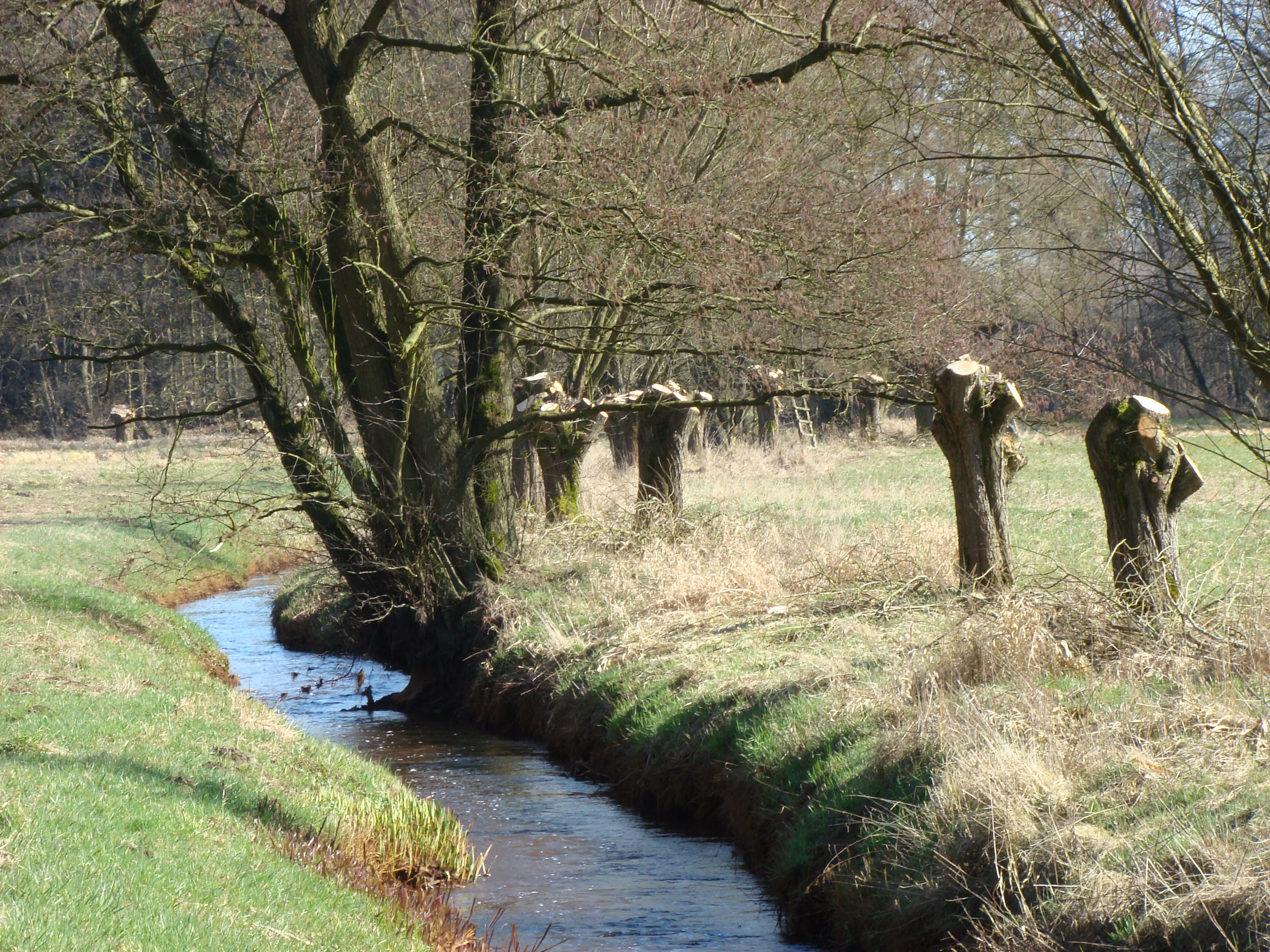
Pollarded willows along the Brunau stream near Bonstorf
