= Unterlüß =

- Village of Südheide
- Coat of arms
- Interactive map of Unterlüß
- Location within Germany Location within Lower Saxony
- Coordinates: 52°51′1″N 10°17′29″E
- Country: Germany
- State: Lower Saxony
- District: Celle
- Municipality: Südheide

Area
  - Total: 77.53 km^{2} (29.93 sq mi)
- Elevation: 108 m (354 ft)

Population (2013-12-31)
  - Total: 3,486
  - Density: 44.96/km^{2} (116.5/sq mi)
- Time zone: UTC+01:00 (CET)
  - Summer (DST): UTC+02:00 (CEST)
- Postal codes: 29345
- Dialling codes: 05827
- Vehicle registration: CE
- Website: gemeinde-suedheide.de

Unterlüß (German pronunciation: [ˈʊntɐˌlyːs]) is a village and former municipality in the district of Celle in Lower Saxony, Germany. It became part of the municipality of Südheide on 1 January 2015. It is about 30 km north-east of Celle and 25 km south-west of Uelzen. It is a station on the railway between Hanover and Hamburg.

== History ==
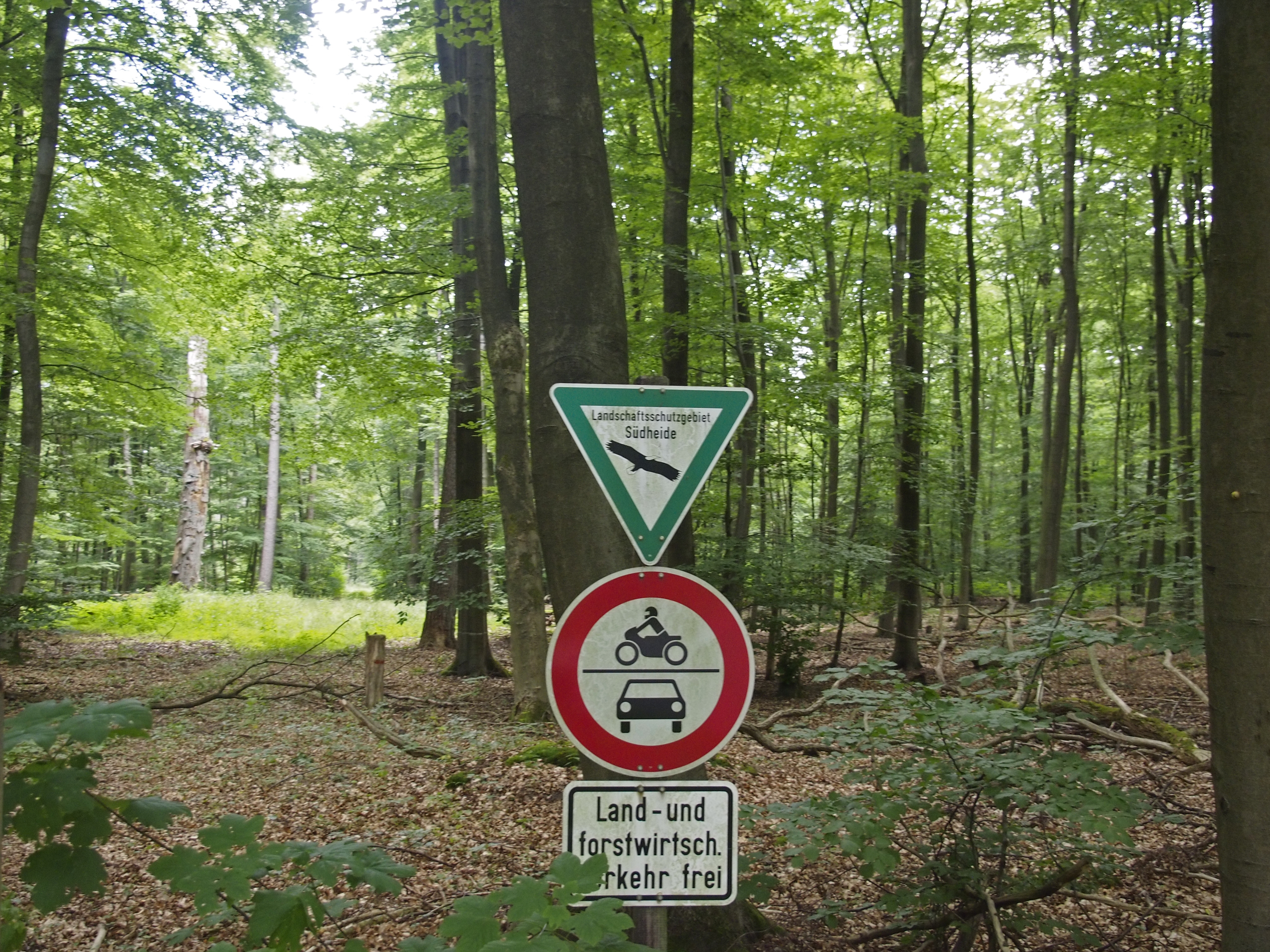
Lüßwald, forest near Unterlüß

The name Lüß was documented in 1569 for a forest, which was probably the source for the name.

In 1847, the railroad was built, eventually becoming part of the line between Hanover and Hamburg, and a station Unterlüß was created, causing a settlement around it. In 1899, the company Rheinmetall (then Rheinische Metallwaren- und Maschinenfabrik Aktiengesellschaft) first installed a shooting range and then began manufacturing weapons. The settlement became a municipality in 1910. After World War I, Rheinmetall had to turn to civil production. They managed a model estate. Some labourers found work in the kieselgur industry.

During the German re-armament, the production was expanded starting in 1934. Rheinmetall and Borsig became nationalised as Rheinmetall-Borsig. Housing for workers was built in Hohenrieth, now also part of Südheide, in 1936. When World War II began, Polish forced labourers were used, and from 1941 also Soviet ones (and finally Jewish deportees).

As allied forces approached, the prisoners were forced to dig their own graves in mock execution. Once the SS guards fled, most of the prisoners (except a few who escaped) were forcibly removed back to Bergen Belsen by local civilians.

After the war, Unterlüß was occupied by the British, who confiscated the partly damaged factories. The village housed c. 4,000 forced labourers and prisoners of war in around 20 barracks. Rheinmetall became a private company again in 1951, and another company, Artos, moved to Unterlüß, making machines for textile industry. In 1955, the British left and Rheinmetall began producing for the Bundeswehr.

The 150th anniversary of Unterlüß was celebrated in 1997. In 2019, an activist group, SIGMAR 2, blocked Rheinmetall in Unterlüß in protest against the export of weapons to Turkey.

== Culture ==
Unterlüß houses the Albert König Museum, dedicated to the painter and graphic artist Albert König, who left his work to the municipality. It is located in the artist's former residence. Unterlüß has a Lutheran church, which was built in 1923 and received the name Friedenskirche (Peace church) in 1974. A Baptist chapel, the Christuskirche, opened in 1980. A Catholic church, St. Paulus, was built in 1926/27 and is now part of a larger parish in Celle-Vorwerk.

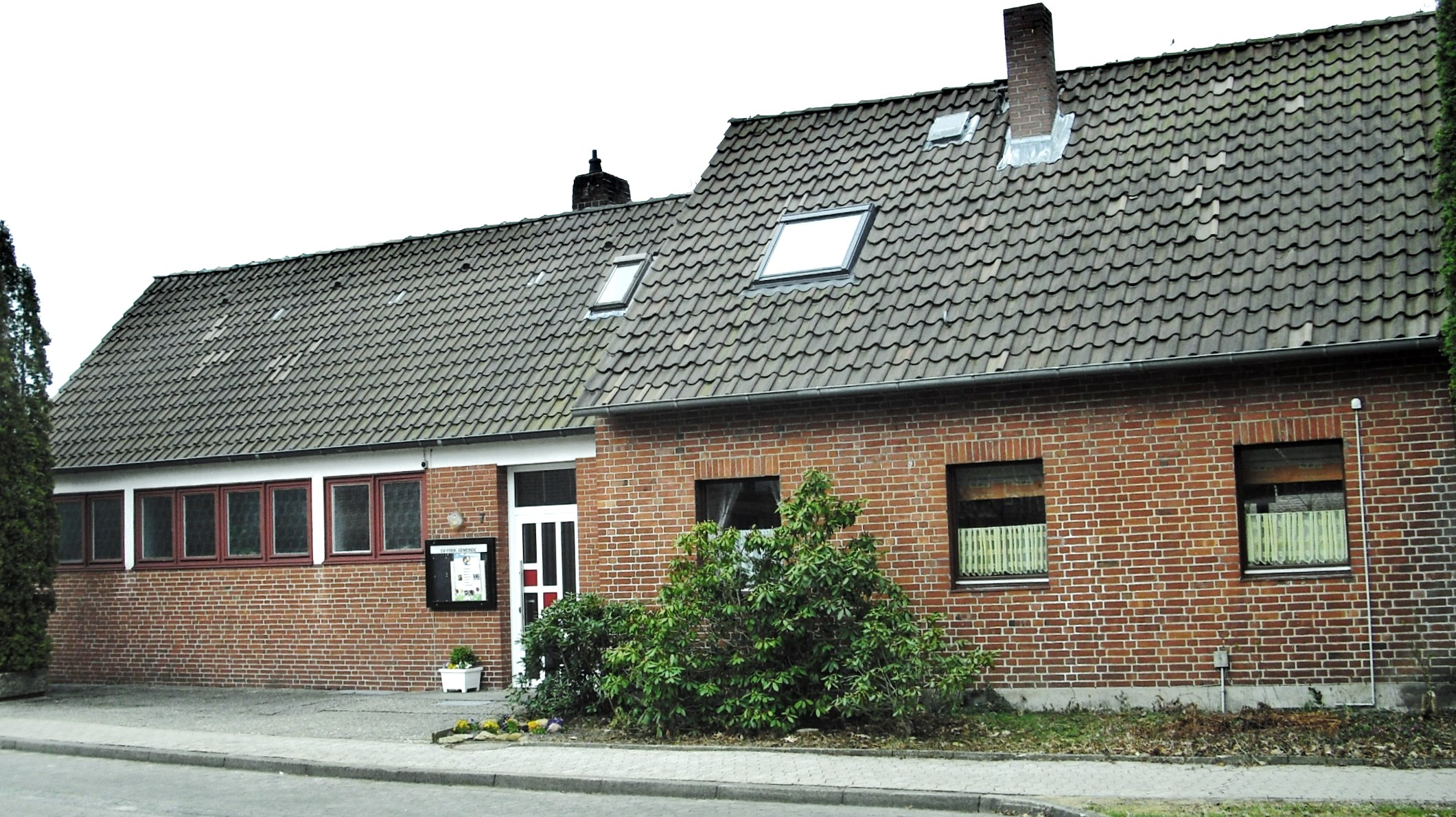
Christuskirche

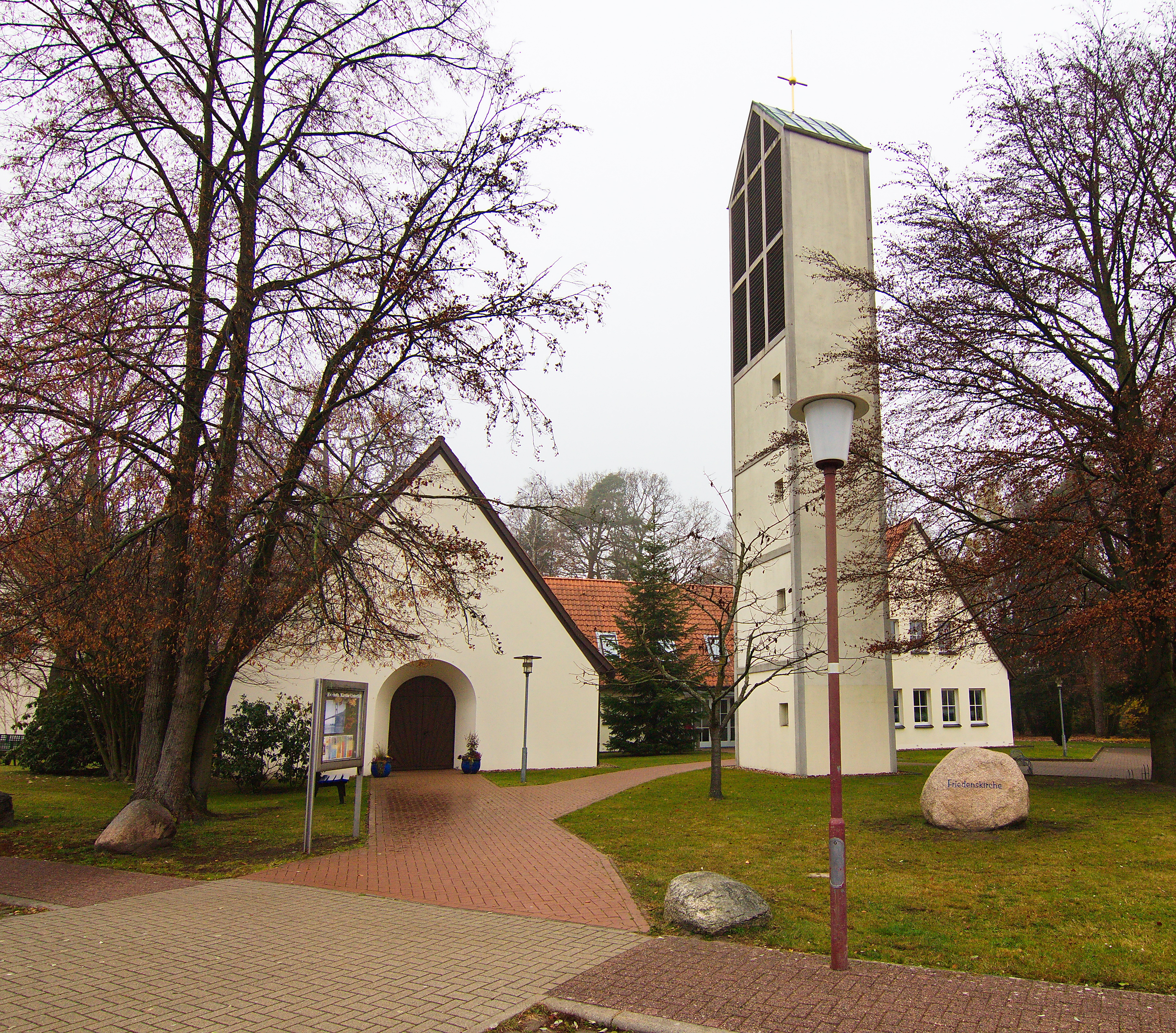
Friedenskirche

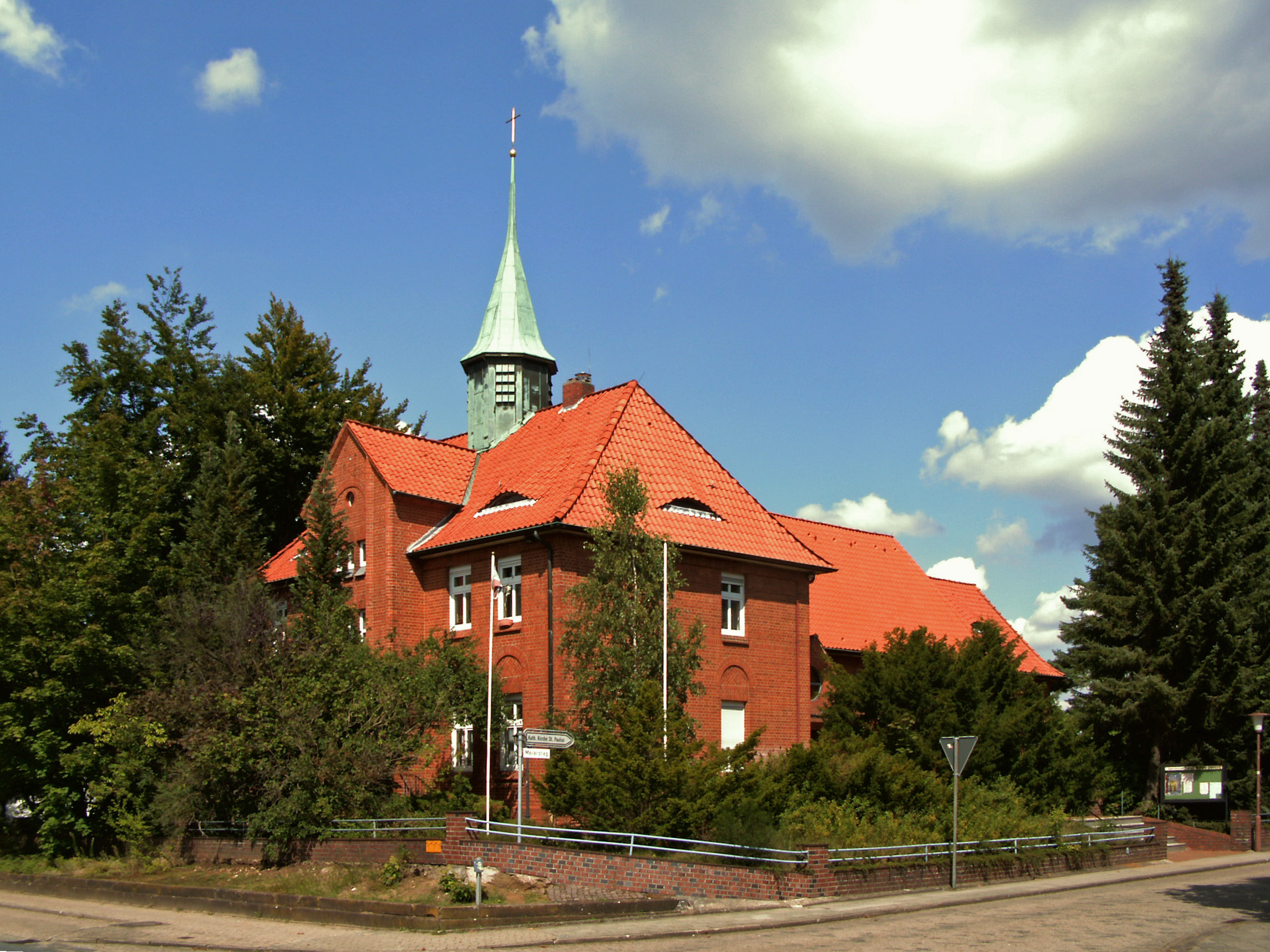
St. Paulus

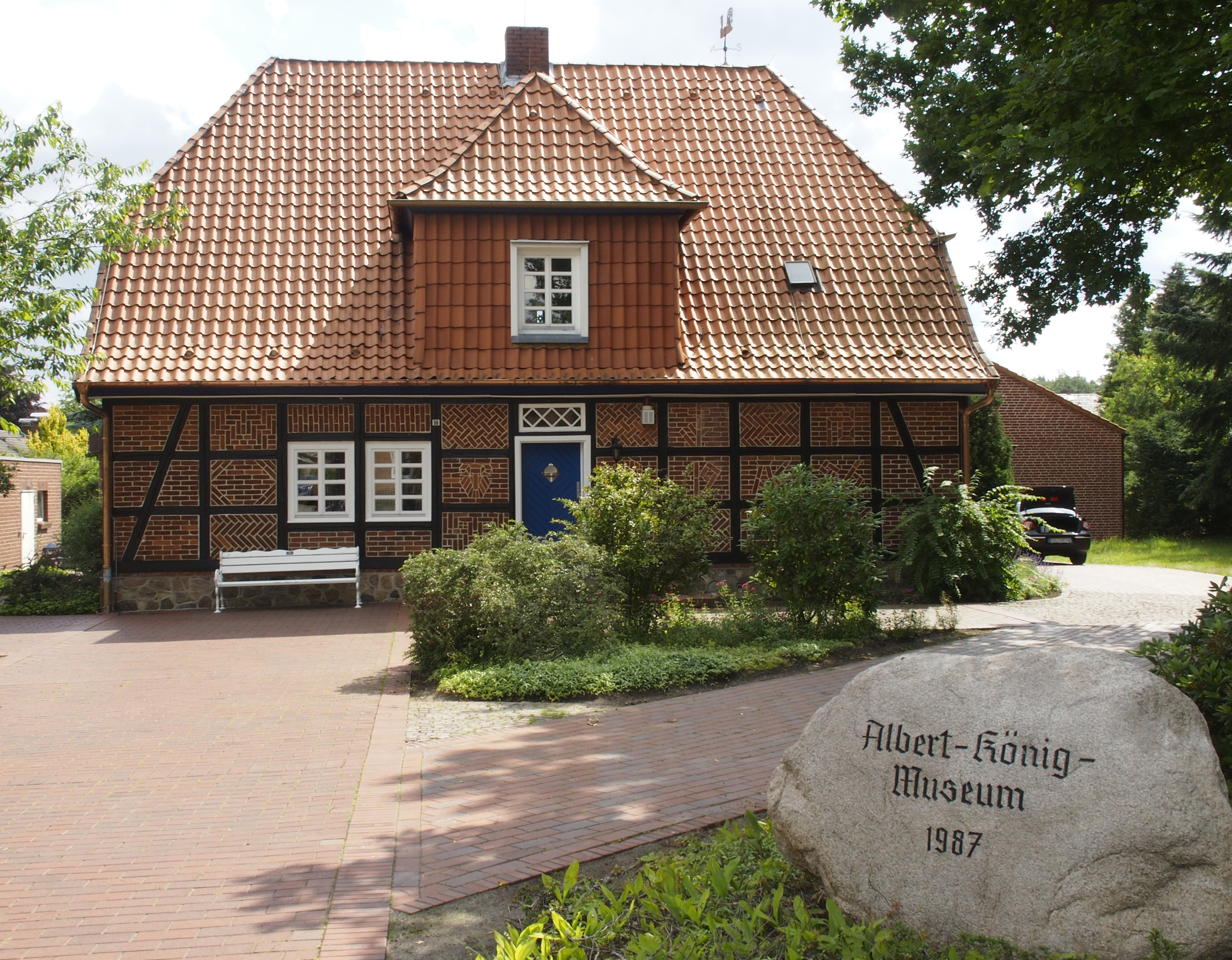
Albert König Museum

== Literature ==
- Jürgen Gedicke: Chronik der Gemeinde Unterlüß. Von den Anfängen als Eisenbahnsiedlung im Jahre 1847 bis zur selbständigen Gemeinde im Jahre 1910. 1997. ISBN 3-930374-10-2.
- Jürgen Gedicke: Chronik der politischen Gemeinde Unterlüß. Band 2: Von der selbständigen Gemeinde im Jahre 1910 bis zum Ende des 2. Weltkrieges im Jahre 1945. Unterlüß 2002. ISBN 3-927399-37-X.
- Karl-Heinz Grotjahn: Meiler, Mühlen und Monarchen. Kleine Geschichte des Kieselgurbergbaus in der Lüneburger Heide 1836–1994 (= Veröffentlichung des Albert-König-Museums 30), Unterlüß 1999.
- Nils Köhler: Zwangsarbeit in der Lüneburger Heide. Organisation und Alltag des "Ausländereinsatzes" 1939–1945. Verlag für Regionalgeschichte, Bielefeld 2004, 2. Auflage. ISBN 3-89534-537-7.
- Rainer Schulze (ed.): Unruhige Zeiten. Erlebnisberichte aus dem Landkreis Celle 1945–49. München 1990. ISBN 3-486-54981-2.
