= Bonstorf Barrows =

Human settlement in Germany

Coordinates: 52°51′51″N 10°03′53″E

The Bonstorf Barrows (German: Grabhügelfeld von Bonstorf) are the remains of a much larger barrow cemetery on the Lüneburg Heath in north Germany dating to the late Neolithic or early Bronze Age. They are located east of the village of Bonstorf, part of the municipality of Hermannsburg in the Lower Saxon district of Celle. The site comprises six, closely packed burial mounds or barrows.

The largest barrow was located originally in a field, but due to its vulnerable location it was dug out in 1973 and reconstructed nearby. Of interest are the internal stones which were found in the burial mound. The barrow was surrounded by a stone circle.

Under the earth mound was a wooden chamber, in which a man had been buried in an east–west orientation. Grave items included an earthenware jar, a palstave, a sword and a bronze dagger.

On the northern perimeter of the mound a woman was interred on a stone bed. She wore two, seven-ribbed bangles and a headdress made of clusters of small, sheet bronze pipes. Furthermore, a round bronze needle (Radnadel) lay on her chest. It is very likely that the woman had a personal relationship with the interred man.

The grave finds are characteristic of the old Bronze Age (i.e. from about 1500 to 1200 BC) in the Lüneburg Heath.

== Photos ==
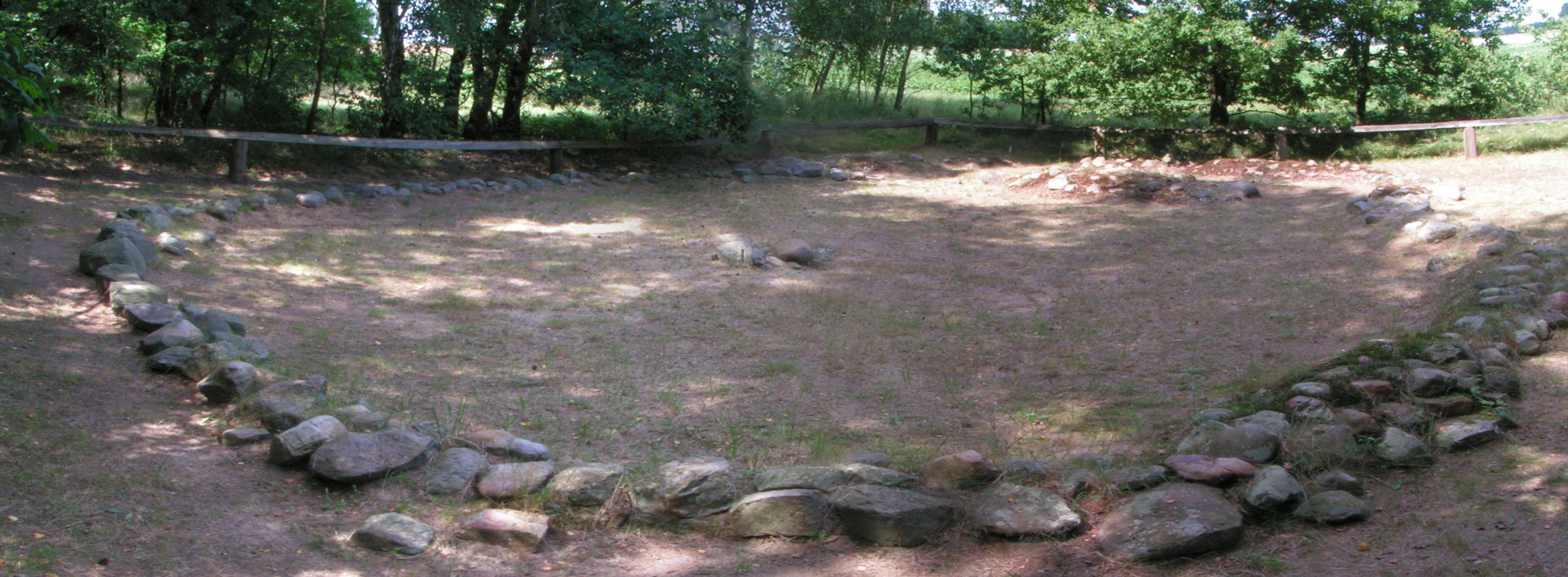
Panoramic view

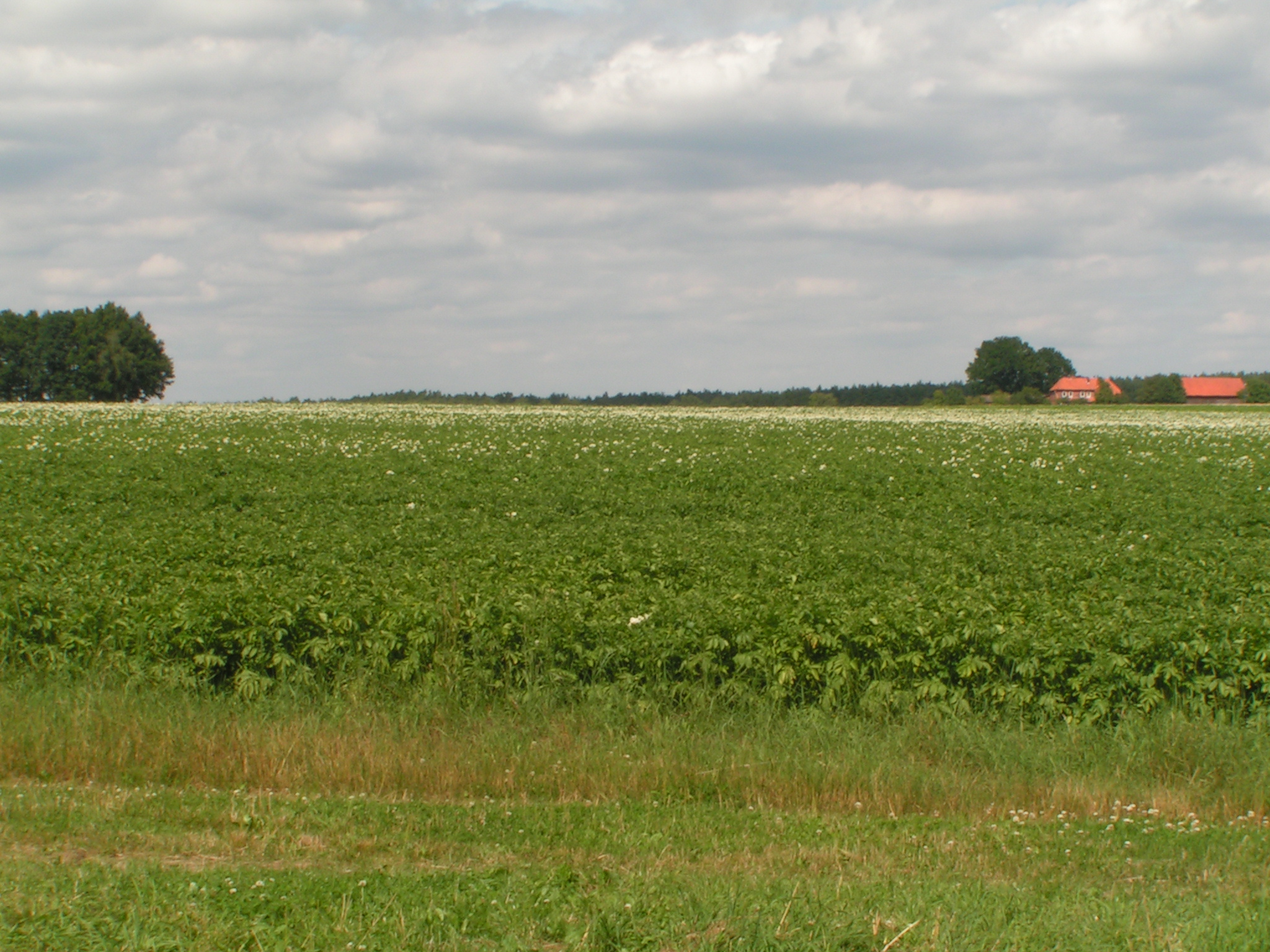
Original site of the barrow cemetery

== Sources ==
- E. L.Voss: Ein reichhaltiger Grabhügel der älteren Bronzezeit von Bonstorf, Kr. Celle 1975 S. 59–83
- GDMP: Bonstorf Barrows – Relax And Be Free, ambient video, amazon 2017
