= Hermannsburg =

- Ortsteil of Südheide
- Coat of arms
- Interactive map of Hermannsburg
- Location within Germany Location within Lower Saxony
- Coordinates: 52°50′10″N 10°05′37″E
- Country: Germany
- State: Lower Saxony
- District: Celle
- Municipality: Südheide

Area
  - Total: 118.63 km^{2} (45.80 sq mi)
- Elevation: 50 m (160 ft)

Population (2013-12-31)
  - Total: 8,061
  - Density: 67.95/km^{2} (176.0/sq mi)
- Time zone: UTC+01:00 (CET)
  - Summer (DST): UTC+02:00 (CEST)
- Postal codes: 29320
- Dialling codes: 05052
- Vehicle registration: CE
- Website: gemeinde-suedheide.de

Hermannsburg (German pronunciation: [ˈhɛʁmansˌbʊʁk]) is a village and a former municipality in the Celle district, in Lower Saxony, Germany. Since 1 January 2015 it is part of the municipality Südheide. It has been a state-recognised resort town since 1971. It is situated on the river Örtze, about 15 kilometres east of Bergen and 30 kilometres north of Celle. It belongs to the district of Celle.

== Geography ==
=== Location ===
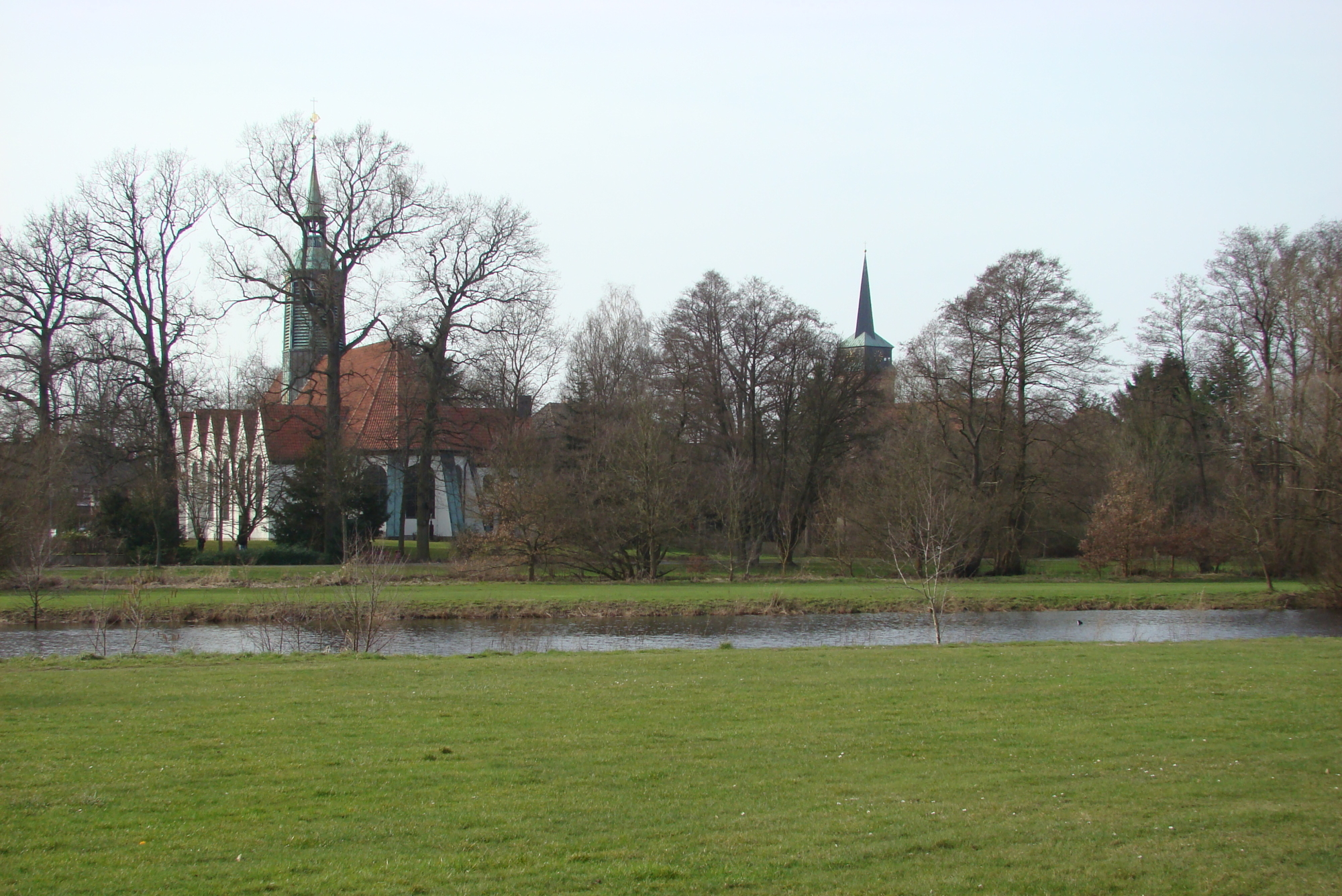
The Örtze Park, Church of St. Peter & St. Paul and Great Cross

The Örtze flows through the centre of Hermannsburg in a north to south direction, whilst the stream of the Weesener Bach, which is known in Hermannsburg as the Lutterbach, crosses the municipality from east to west and empties into the Örtze near the Lutterhof farm.

Hermannsburg itself is a basic urban centre (Grundzentrum). The nearest middle-order urban centre (Mittelzentrum), the county town of Celle, is 28 kilometres away. Hermannsburg lies 78 kilometres northeast of the state capital of Hanover and south of Hamburg, about 100 kilometres away.

=== Division of the municipality ===
The former municipality of Hermannsburg consisted of 6 districts:

- Baven
- Beckedorf
- Bonstorf
- Hermannsburg
- Oldendorf
- Weesen

== History ==
=== Foundation ===
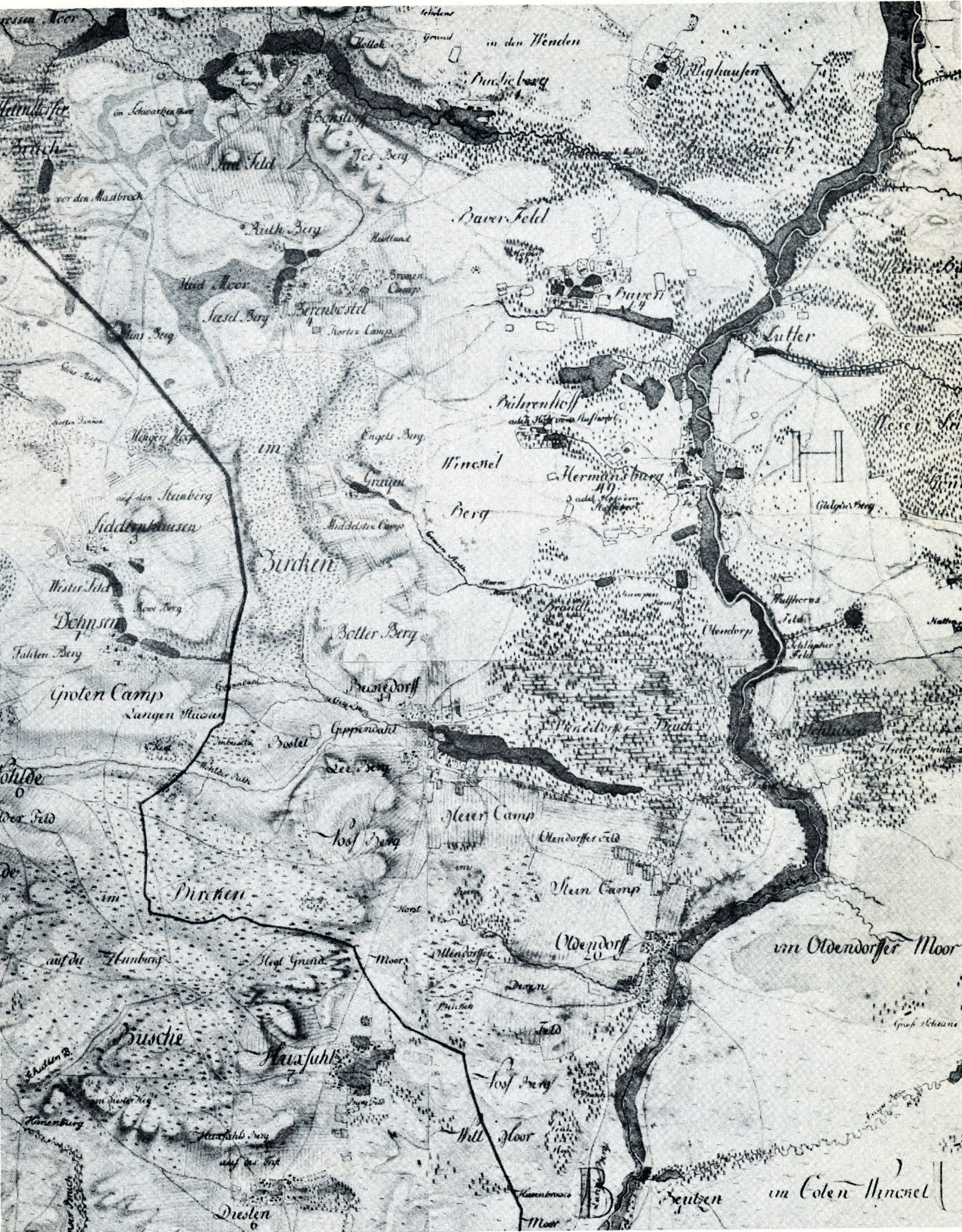
Hermannsburg and environs in the 18th century

Hermannsburg is first mentioned in 1059 as "Heremannesburc" by Emperor Henry IV in a document. It is certain, however, that there had been a settlement on the site earlier than that. During building work on the Church of St. Peter and St. Paul in 1957, a bronze crucifix was found that dates to the 10th century.

In addition there is evidence that the Minden monk, Landolf, undertook missionary work in the 9th century in the Örtze valley. On the spot where, today St. Peter and St. Paul's now stands, a baptistry had been built in the period between 800 and 900 A. D. by the Christian mission sent out from Minden on a sandy loess island near the thingstead of the Muthwidde Gau. Its foundations were also discovered in 1957.

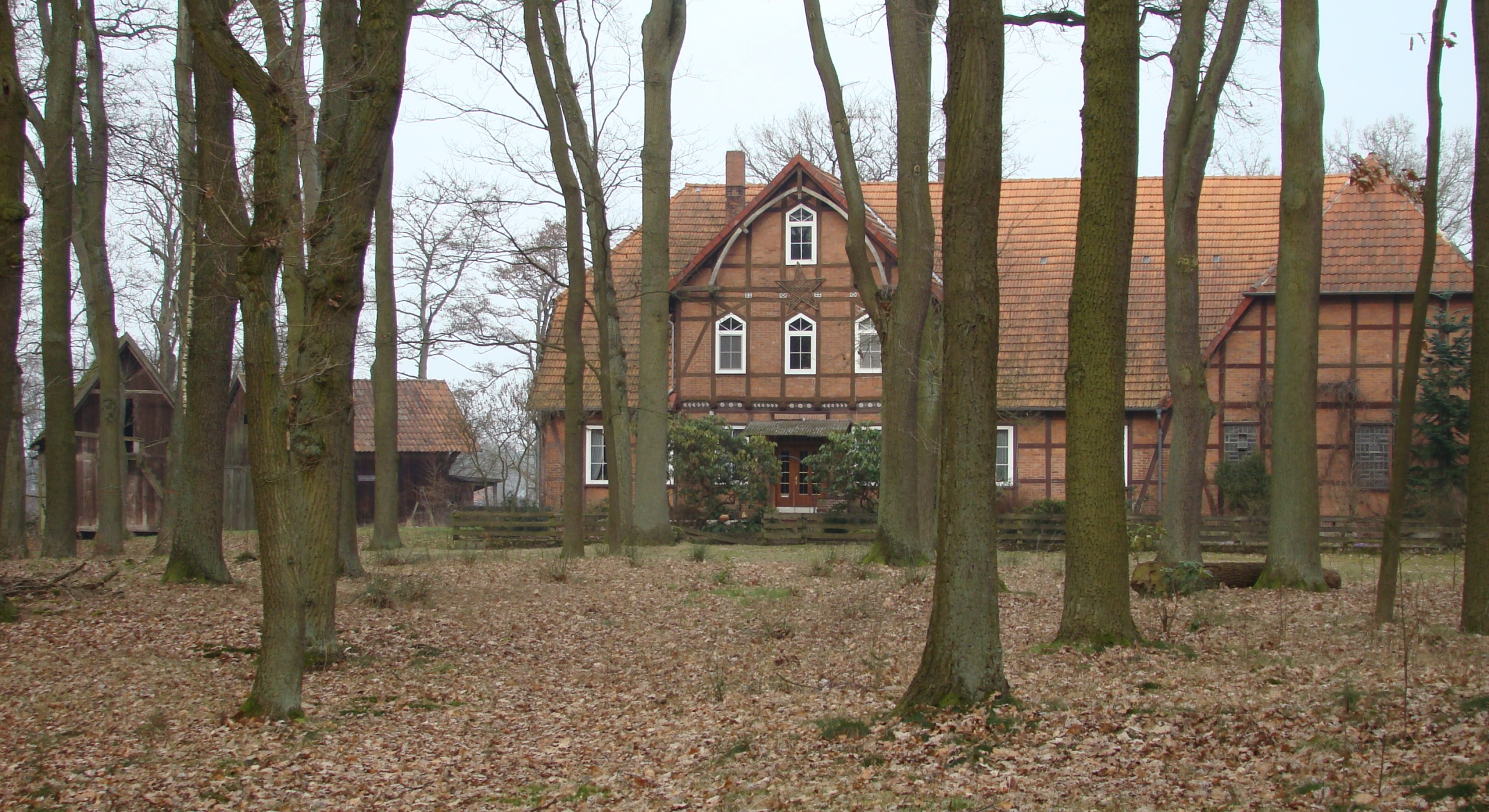
The Lutterhof farm, with its treppenspeicher barns and old oaks

In the neighbourhood there were at that time already eight old farmsteads; four of them lay west of the Örtze and four to the east of the river. The "Lutterhof" and "Misselhorn", both east of the Örtze are still there today. The old "Rißmann's Hof", renamed the "Behrenssche Hof" in 1756 after its new owner, Johann Hinrich Behrens (1730–1808), also lay east of the Örtze. It was donated by its last owner, Heinrich Wilhelm Behrens, on 30 January 1854 to the Hermannsburg Mission. Behrens was trained as a missionary and in 1857 sent out with his family to South Africa. The farm, now called "Missionshof", was sold on 15 June 1967 by the Mission Centre of Hermannsburg (Missionsanstalt Hermannsburg) to the civil parish of Hermannsburg. It was demolished in order to build the secondary modern school here. In addition to the aforementioned eight old farmsteads (Einzelhöfe), there were also various so-called Sattelhöfe, tenant farms, at Oldendorf, Beckedorf, Schlüpke and Weesen, which had to provide manpower for the castle.

The name of the settlement was derived from its likely founder, the Saxon margrave, Hermann Billung, a vassal of Otto I, and the aforementioned castle or Burg. The foundation of the village about the year 940, is based on the fact that between the church and the castle an estimated 10 cottages (Kötnereien) and several smallholders (Kleinbauern) and tradesmen had settled. That led to the formation of a civil and a church parish which eventually became the village of Hermannsburg.

The princely line of the Billung family ruled over the region until they died out in 1106. Thereafter the country was ruled by the House of Welf, whose lordship lasted until 1866, with short interruptions during French occupation in the Seven Years' War (1756–1763) and the period of the Kingdom of Westphalia (1807–1813). From 1866 Hermannsburg was part of the Prussian Province of Hanover. In the course of Prussian district reforms the village was assigned to the district of Celle.

=== Great fires ===
On 14 April 1667 a great fire broke out in Hermannsburg in which 28 houses were destroyed, including the school and the verger's house (Küsterhaus).

On 9 May 1802 Hermannsburg experienced another terrible fire. The district office (Amtshaus) burned down along with its outbuildings, 13 homes and 21 other buildings. The "extraordinary violence" of the fire impoverished many villagers, most could save little or even nothing at all.

=== Millennium celebration ===
In 1973 Hermannsburg held its millennium celebration on the occasion of the 1,000th anniversary of the death of Hermann Billung (27 March 973).

=== Importance of the church and mission ===
The Evangelical-Lutheran pastor, Louis Harms, has a special significance for Hermannsburg. In 1849 he founded the mission seminary, a training school for missionaries, from which the Hermannsburg Mission (today: Evangelical-Lutheran Mission in Lower Saxony) was developed which worked especially in the African region (especially southern Africa and Ethiopia). As a representative of revival movement he also impacted the long term religious life of the village. That had inter alia the consequence that, in 1878, out of concern about the suppression of the Lutheran confession by the reformed Prussian monarchy, the Evangelical-Lutheran High Cross church parish was formed, that merged with other Lutheran churches into an independent "old confessional" (altkonfessionell) Lutheran church body – the Hanoverian Evangelical-Lutheran Free Church, a predecessor of the present-day Independent Evangelical Lutheran Church. Since 1846, at Epiphany (6 January) at irregular intervals, and once a year since 1851, on Nativity of Saint John the Baptist (24 June), the mission festival is held, to which up to 6,000 came. Even today, the mission festival is celebrated on a weekend around 24 June in the park of the mission seminary.

=== Churches ===
==== Church of St. Peter and St. Paul ====
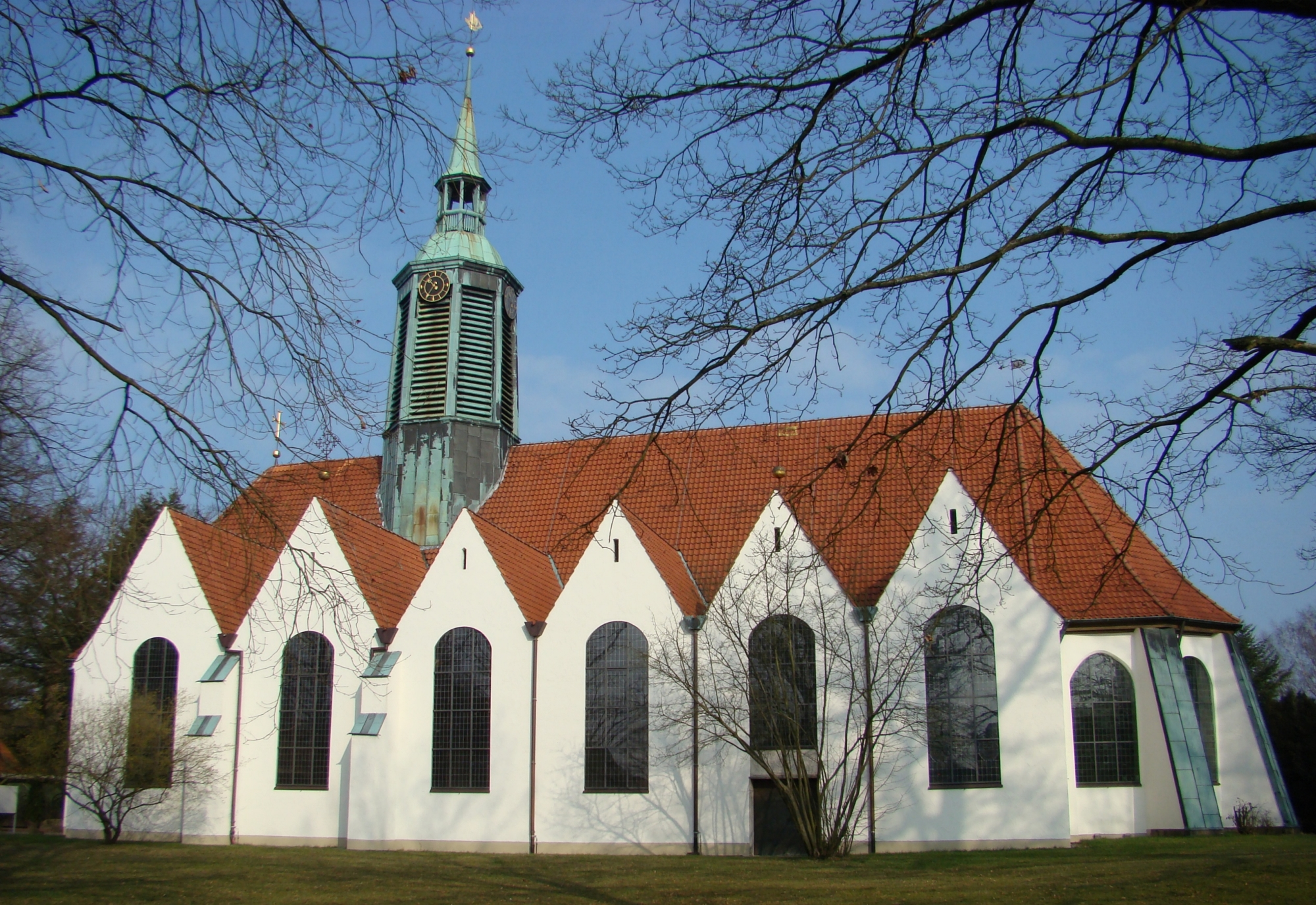
St. Peter and St. Paul's

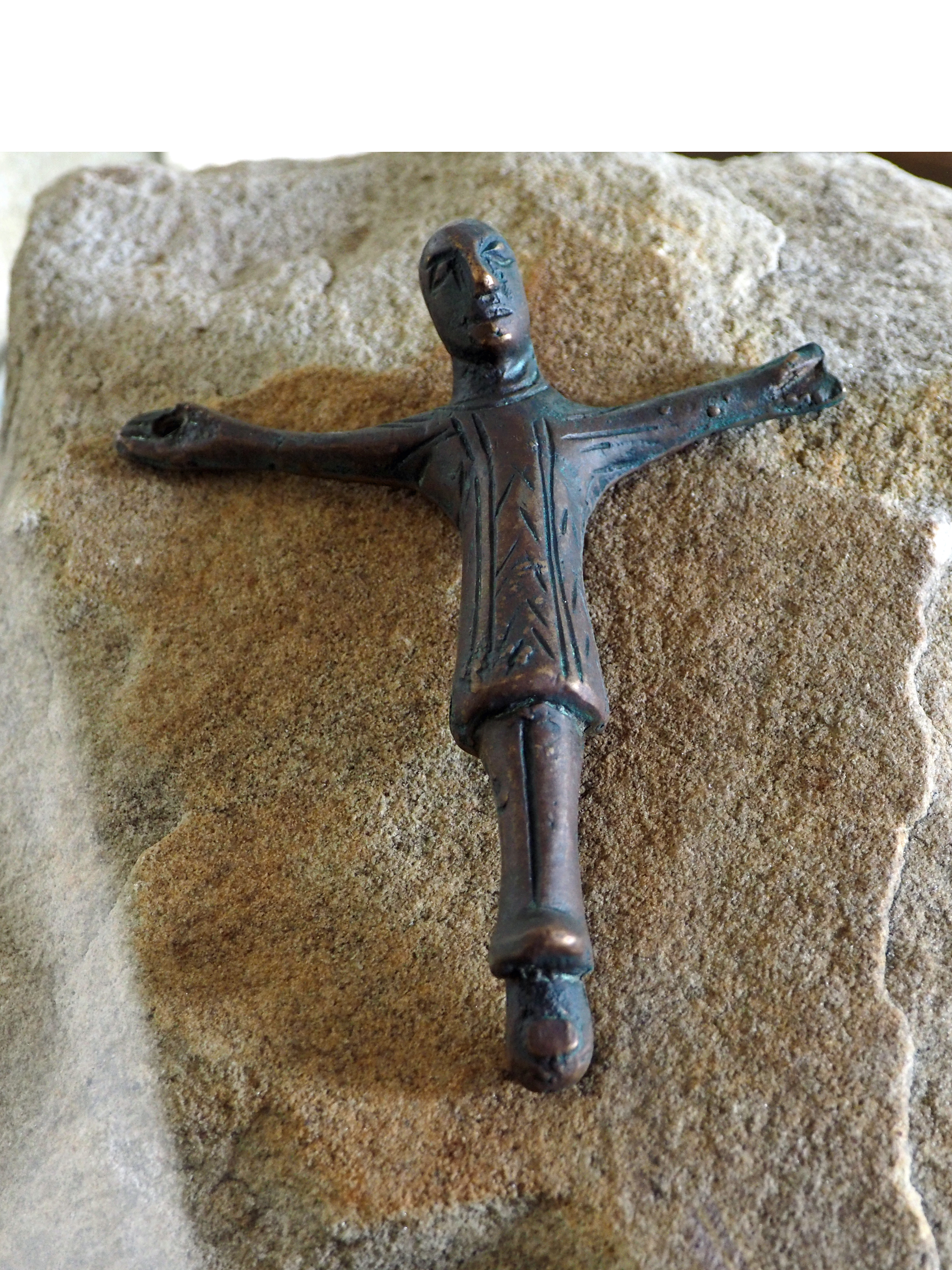
Bronze crucifix from the 10th century (replica)

The first wooden missionary church, probably built around 850, was burned down in 955 during the incursions by the Wends. Around 970, thanks to the Saxon duke, Hermann Billung, a new church was built in the Romanesque style. The new building was erected somewhat further south of the old church, as has been confirmed during excavation work which revealed a thick, charred layer of charcoaled wood. The foundation walls of this building consist of about 1 metre thick dry stone walls made of bog iron stone (Raseneisenstein) blocks of clamshell construction which indicates a Dutch builder. The church has an almost square chancel with inside dimensions of 4.40 × 5.60 metres and a rectangular nave with an inside width of 6.50 metres. The chancel was divided by a 1-metre-thick (3.3 ft) wall from the nave, which had never been seen in other old village churches.

This church also burnt down, probably in the 15th century. It was replaced in 1450 by a Gothic church and was used in that form until 1956.

Due to its poor structural condition and the growing number of parishioners, it was decided to greatly extend the church building. Initially it was planned to expand the original body of the building by extending the nave and building side aisles, but the ceiling vault collapsed during construction work. As a result, an entirely new church emerged for which only the old roof timbering and old apse were re-used. The side aisles, each with six subdivisions, and the tower, built in the form of a turret, give the church a distinctive appearance. Of its six bells, the smallest and oldest dates to the pre-Reformation period (1495). Another bell, the largest, dates to the year 1681, the remaining four bells to the year 1949. Inside, the vaulting ribs in the ceiling are modelled on those of its Gothic predecessor and the large side windows give the church a lot of natural light. The oldest inventory items are the wooden baptismal font and a painted chandelier also made of wood, both from the 18th century. The remaining furniture, the altar, pulpit, organ and the 26 mounted brass chandeliers around the nave give an impression of the typical church art of the 1950s.

In redesigning the church in the years 1956-1959 its old foundations were discovered. Also uncovered was an ancient bronze crucifix depicting the crucified Christ, 12 centimetres in size, a work in Romanesque style dating from the 10th century, something which is unique in the Lüneburg Heath is unique. A faithful copy of this valuable crucifix is displayed in the prayer corner in the rear left corner of the nave.

The organ (III+P/34) was built in 1963 by the firm of Emil Hammer Orgelbau. With about 4,700 parishioners, St. Peter and St. Paul's is the largest Lutheran church parish in the village. It belongs to the Evangelical-Lutheran State Church of Hanover.

===== Great Church of the Cross =====
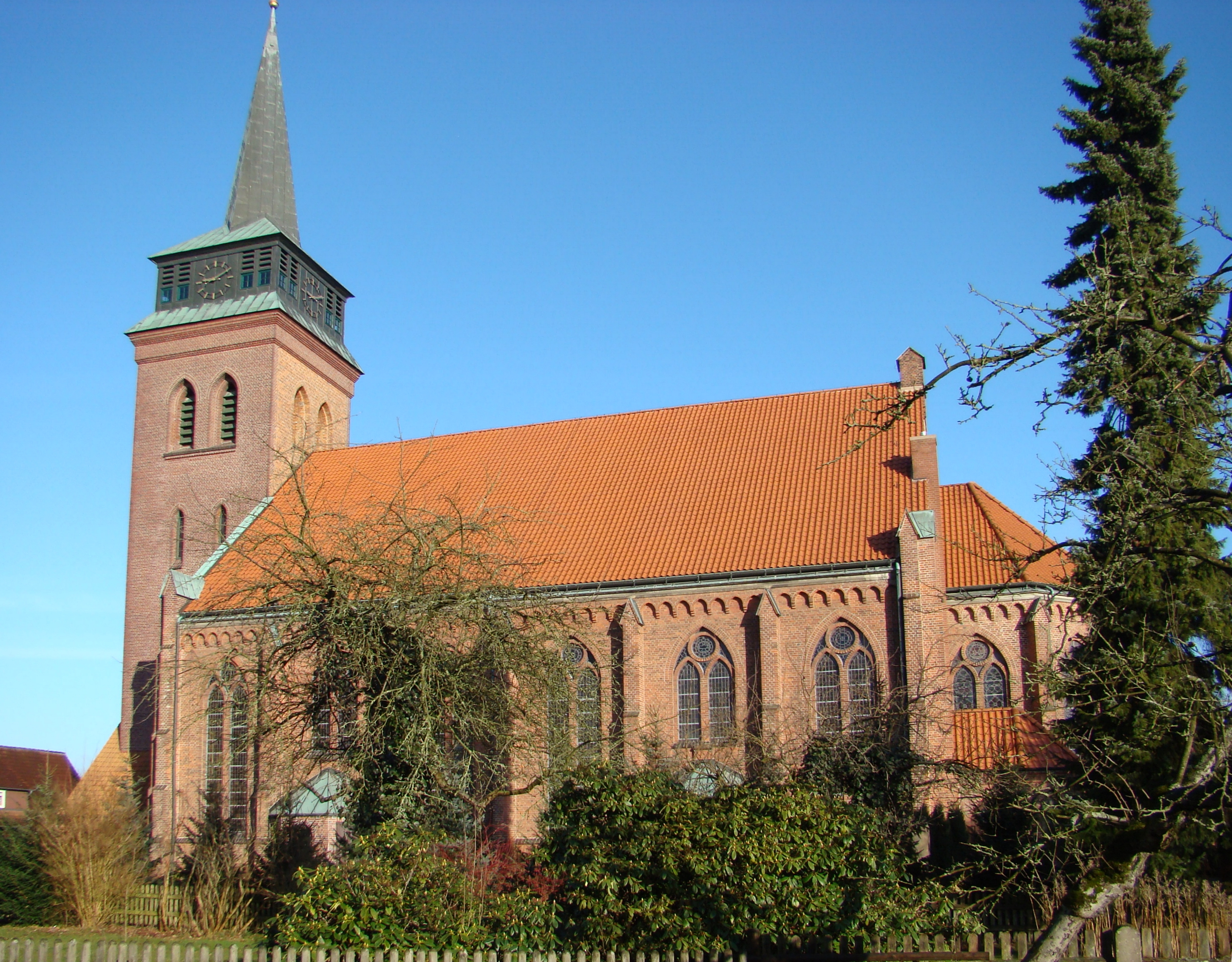
Great Cross church

The Evangelical-Lutheran parish of the Great Cross belongs to the Niedersachsen-West church district (Kirchenbezirk) of the Independent Evangelical Lutheran Church (SELK) and was established in the 19th century. Following the defeat of the House of Welf in 1866 by the Prussians the Prussian king tried to extend the Prussian Union of churches between Reformed Protestants and Lutherans in the Kingdom of Hanover as well, however, in the end both confessions retained separate church bodies. Here, too, the state intervened in the orders of service, doctrine and constitution of the Church. But in Hermannsburg, the pastor of St. Peter and St. Paul, Pastor Theodor Harms, protested against this. Theodor was the brother of Louis Harms, who had been removed from office by the Lutheran state church and had to leave the parish. On 13 February 1878 a large number of people decided to withdraw from the state church and founded the Great Cross parish. It was planned from the outset to build a large church in order to have enough space for visitors to the mission festival. On 28 September 1878 topping out was celebrated. The church has room for about 1,000 people. The nave has no pillars, making it probably the largest unsupported wooden nave ceiling in Europe. The 52-metre-high (171 ft) tower is visible from a long way off. The church is a listed building. Today, there are approximately 2,200 parishioners of the busy church, who are served by two pastors. The church has a large choir and a brass band ensemble with many horns under the direction of a cantor.

The motto of the parish is "No cross, no crown" ("Ohne Kreuz keine Krone").

===== Little Cross Church =====
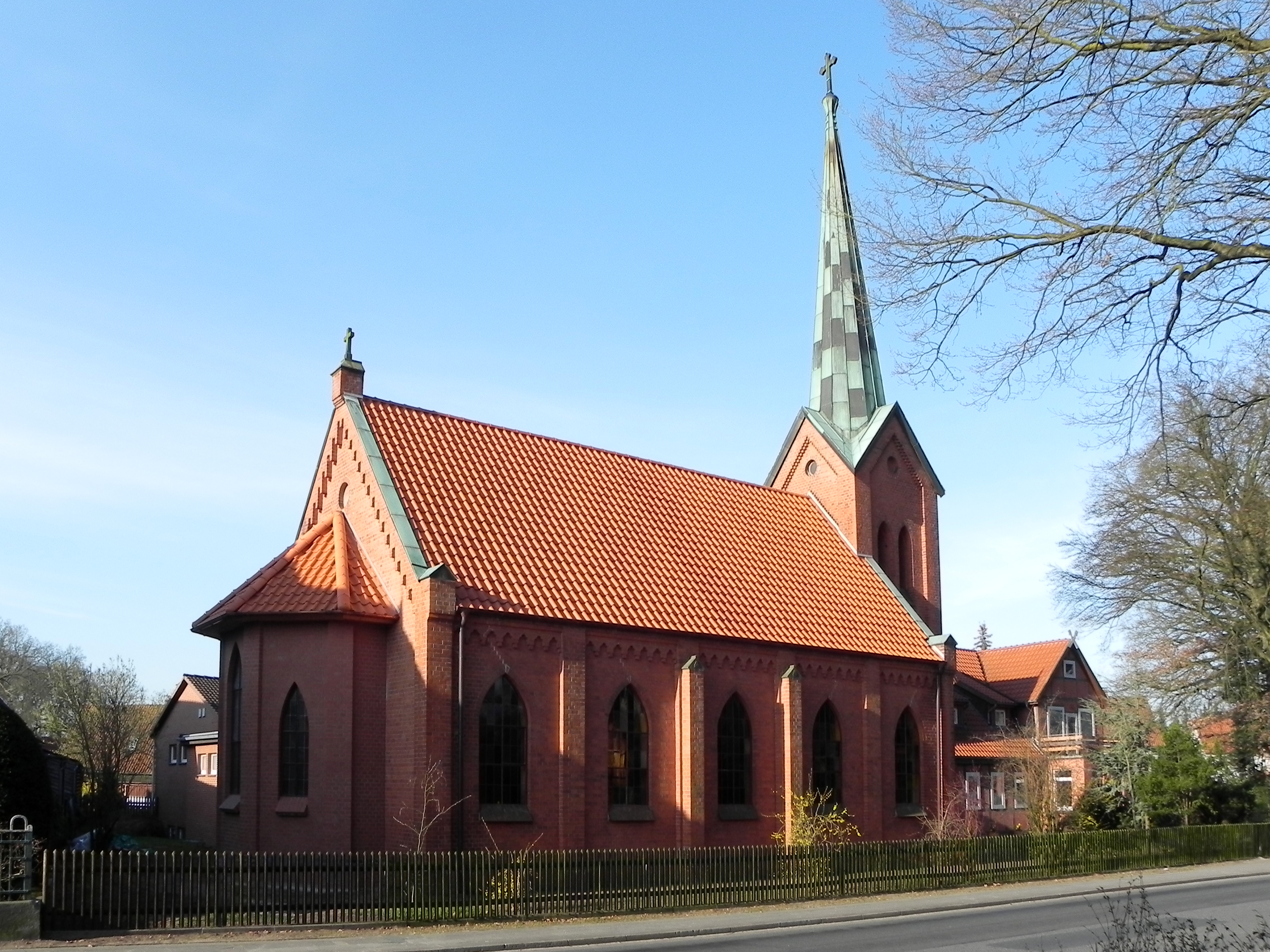
Little Church of the Cross

The Evangelical-Lutheran Little Cross parish (Kleine Kreuzgemeinde) also belongs to the church district of Niedersachsen-West in the Independent Evangelical Lutheran Church. The Little Cross parish was formed as a result of disagreements over the succession of the pastor's office of the Great Church parish. On 14 February 1886 the first service was celebrated in the Little Church parish. On 16 April the Great Cross parish separated from the Hanoverian Evangelical-Lutheran Free Church, a predecessor of the SELK. So for a short while the two parishes belonged to different Lutheran churches. Construction of the actual church began 1 August 1886 and the topping out ceremony took place on 6 and 7 October 1886. On 30 March 1887 the Little Church of the Cross (Kleine Kreuzkirche) was consecrated by Pastor Friedrich Wolff. The church cost 15,000 marks, all of which was raised by donations.

Following the merger of various old confessional Lutheran churches the two Lutheran churches of the Cross belong to the SELK and help define the character of Hermannsburg.

== Culture and sport ==
=== Theatre ===
Hermannsburg resident, Robert Brand, started up a theatre group which regularly puts on new plays. He plans to build a new theatre building as part of his project "Five Euro Theatre" (Theater 5 Euro). His theatre group has disbanded however. The actors and actresses have got together again and founded their own troupe: Hermanns Burgtheater.

=== Museums ===
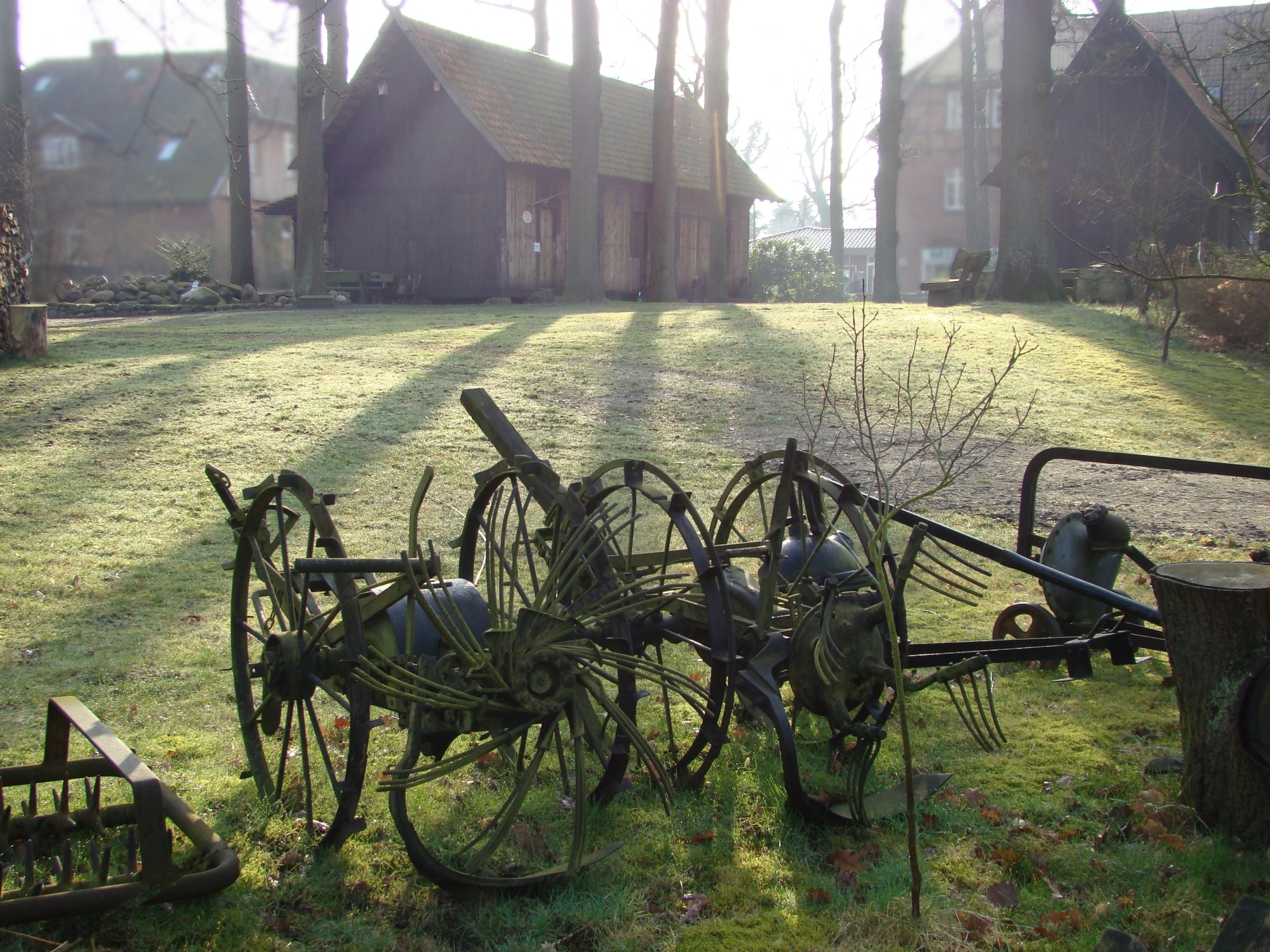
Exterior of the local history museum

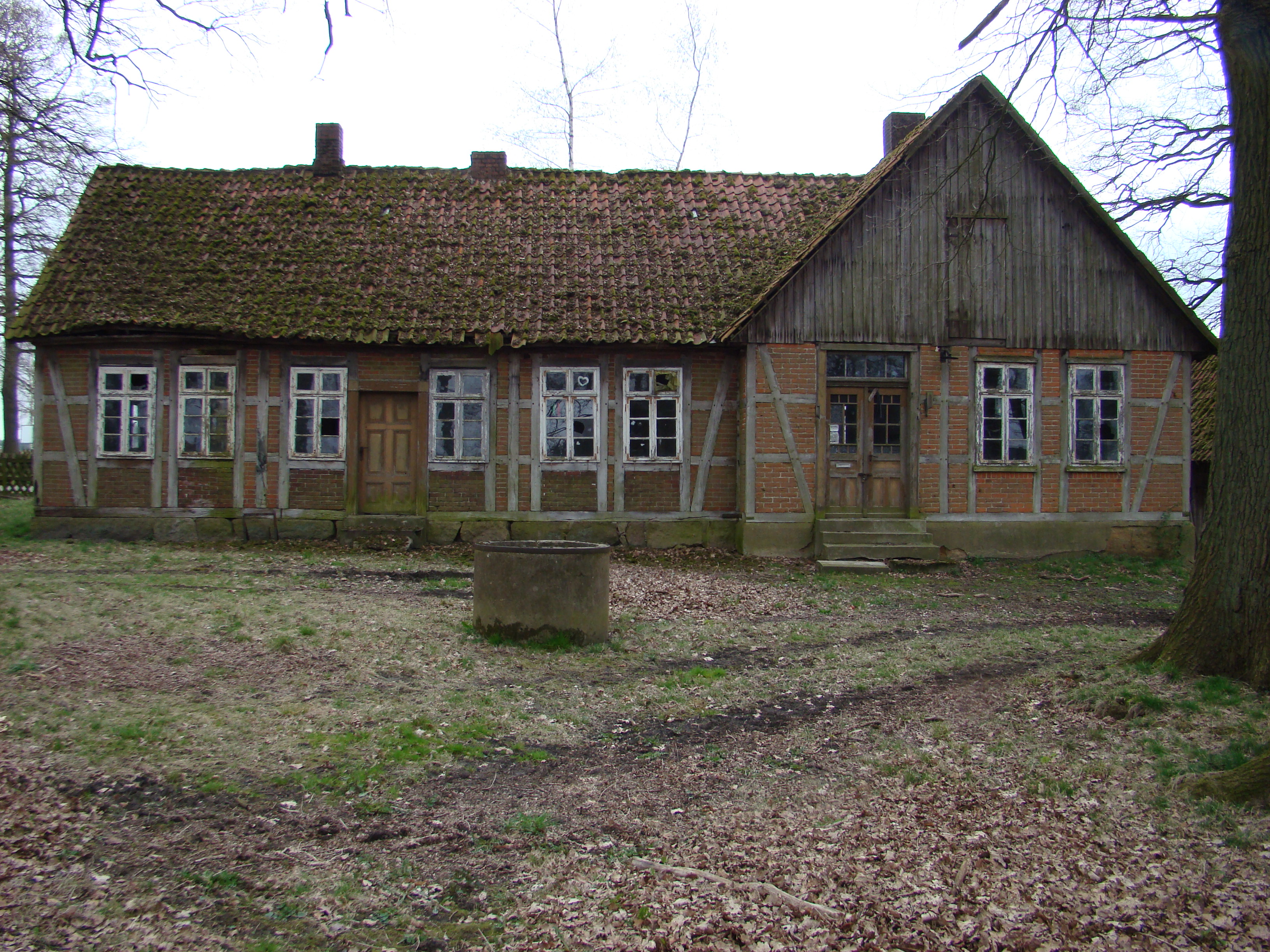
Old servants' quarters in Baven, now demolished

The Hermannsburg Local History Museum has been sponsored since 2000 by the Society for the Preservation of the Museum of the Local History Association of Hermannsburg (Förderkreis Heimatmuseum des Heimatbundes Hermannsburg), which was founded in response to the threatened closure of the museum. The museum has an annually changing exhibition. On the museum land, several historic objects have been rebuilt: a Bienenzaun beehive, an historic clay oven (from Diesten), a double storage barn from the 17th and 18th centuries (from Beckedorf), a meeting place with cobbled village square and a storage barn from the 17th century (from Scheuen). A former servants' house (Häuslingshaus) from the village of Baven was dismantled there and will be reassembled on the museum's land. (Häuslinge were farm workers who worked on a farm and were therefore allowed to stay in the house for a low rent, or sometimes even for free).

Opposite the museum is the Ludwig Harms House, a conference centre with an exhibition, cafe, bookshop and "One World Shop". In addition to the permanent exhibition called "Candace – Mission possible", which gives an insight into the current work of the Evangelical Lutheran Mission in Lower Saxony and a nostalgic look at the mission ship, Candace, there are regularly changing exhibitions with art or cultural themes.

=== Sport ===
Hermannsburg has a forest swimming baths with an open air pool and indoor pool. Since the 2003 season the open air pool has been closed due to cost. There are also tennis courts, football pitches, four sports halls and a motocross course in the parish.

=== Clubs and societies ===
Hermannsburg has around 60 registered societies and clubs. These include several, like the male voice choir (founded 1888), the Volunteer Fire Service (1893) and TuS Hermannsburg (1904) are older than 100 years.

== Regular events ==
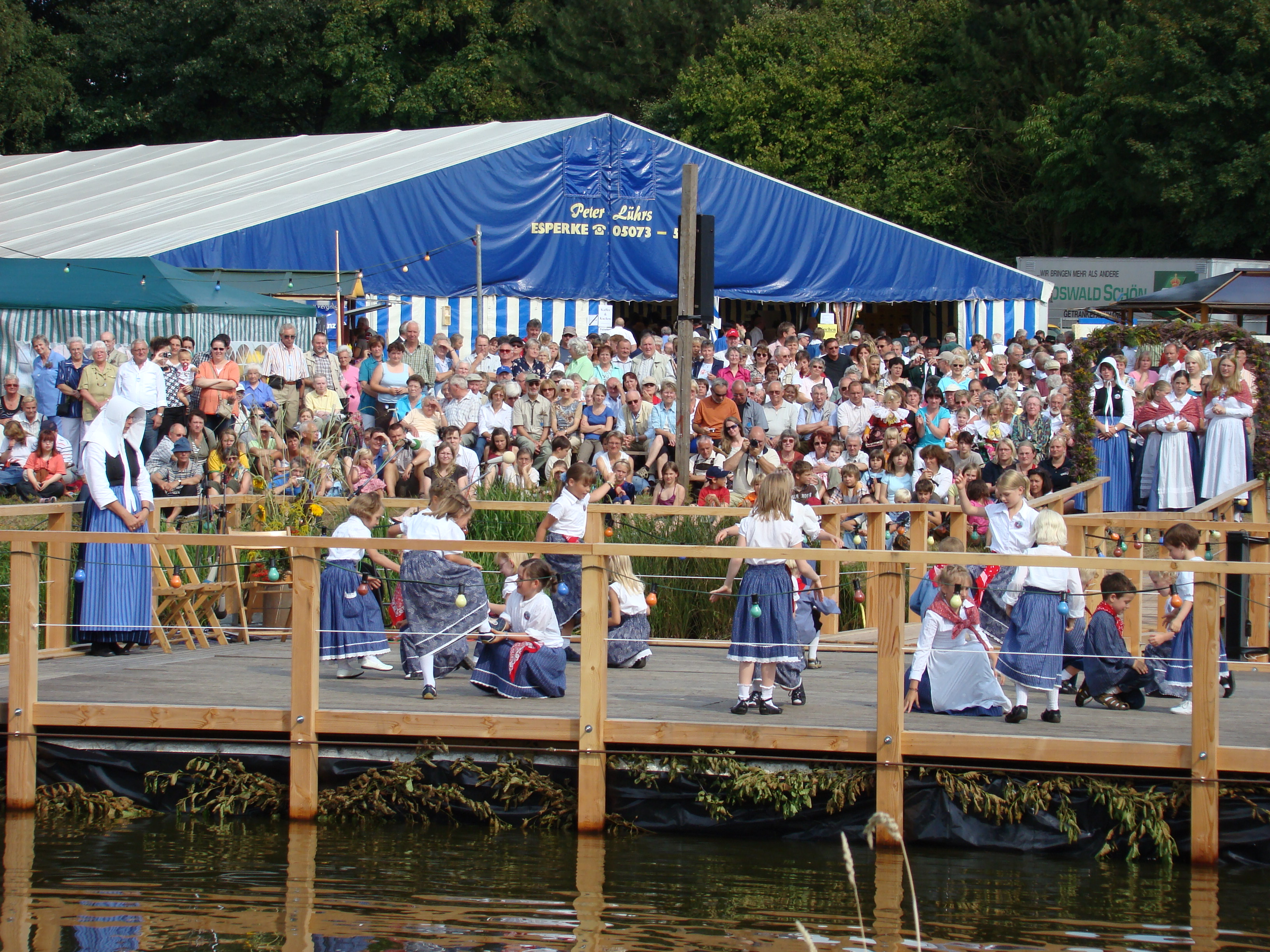
Children's group on the water stage at the Trachtenfest in 2008

Every three years in August the International Trachtenfest takes place in Hermannsburg. Since 1851 the Hermannsburg Mission has celebrated the traditional Hermannsburg Mission Festival every summer with guests from its partner and sponsor churches. The Hermannsburg Schützenfest takes place regularly on the first weekend of August.

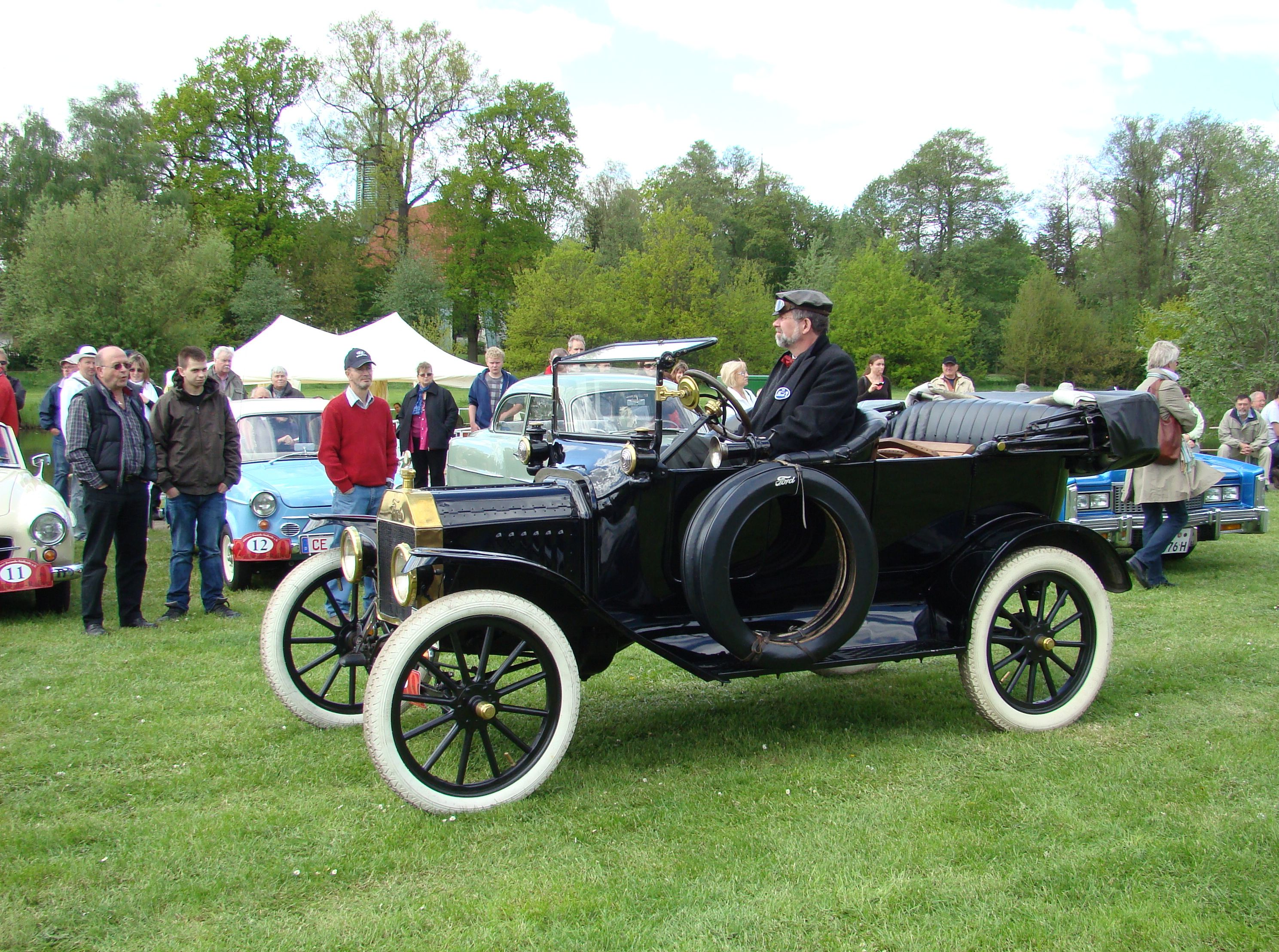
Ford Model T at the veteran car rally in 2010

Once a year, at the beginning of May the great Hermannsburg Veteran Car Rally (Hermannsburger Oldtimertreffen) takes place in the Örtze Park. It is put on together with the International Museum Day.

The Südheide Running and Walking Day (Volkslauf und -Wandertag) is organised every spring (April/May) by the TuS Hermannsburg. Their youth handball tournament takes place in early summer (June/July). Every summer there is a theme concert by the schoolchildren and teachers of the Christian Grammar School in the school's own hall.

=== Knight's Tournament ===
On the last weekend in May the Örtze-Ring and Ritterbund Hartmann von Aue stage a large medieval tournament. More than 300 re-enactors and almost 30 horsemen from the medieval period take part. Medieval knights' societies take part in the historic knights' tournament site in the Örtze Park. Around 100 tents are set up, there is a medieval market, a two-lane jousting arena with a large stand. There is an archery tournament, a tournament of the squires, sword fighting demonstrations and a knights' tournament. In 2009 the tournament was held for the fifth time in Hermannsburg. Knights' societies compete for the German Knights Championship of Hermannsburg.

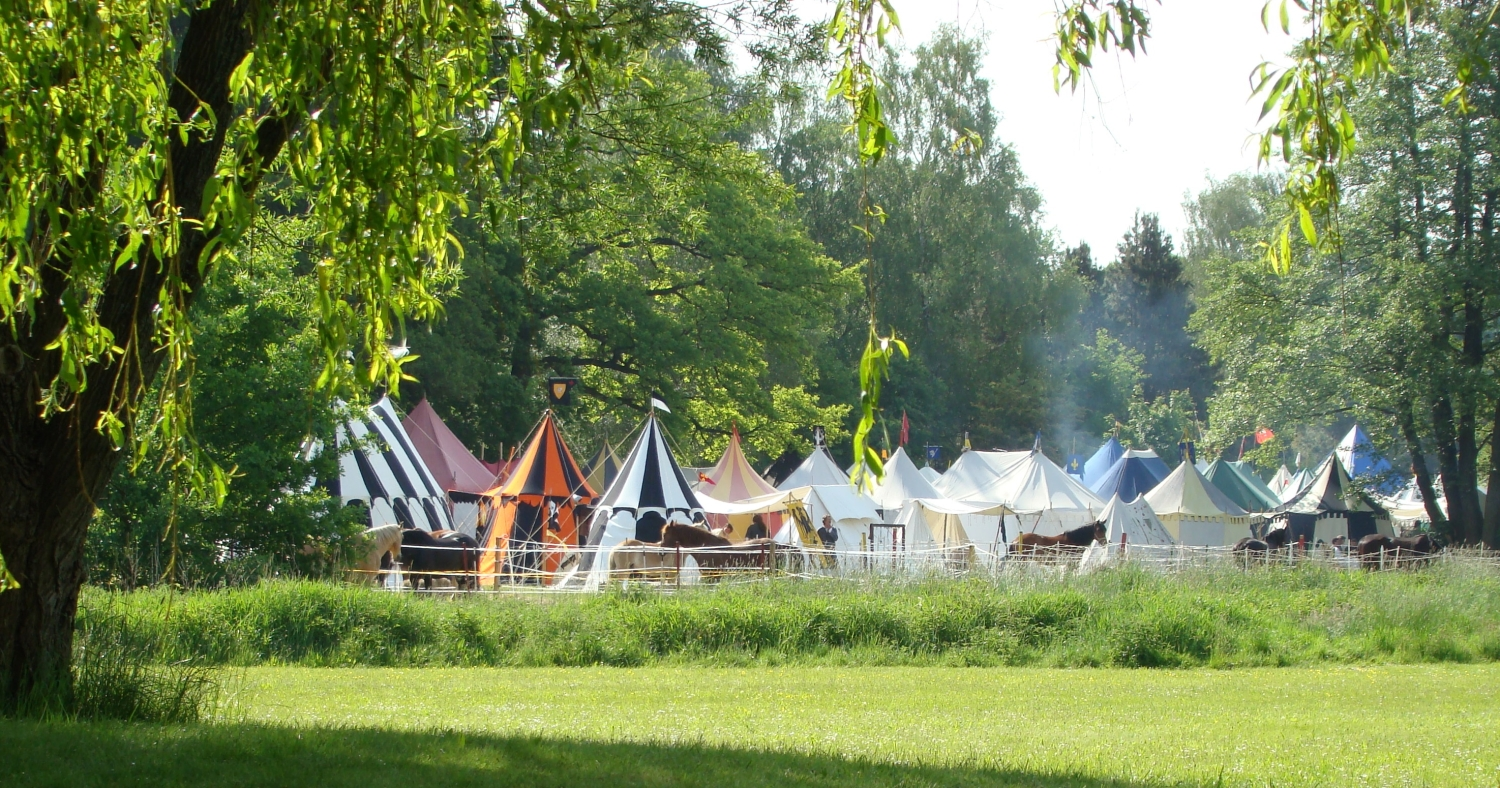
Camp of the Örtze knight's tournament in the Örtze Park

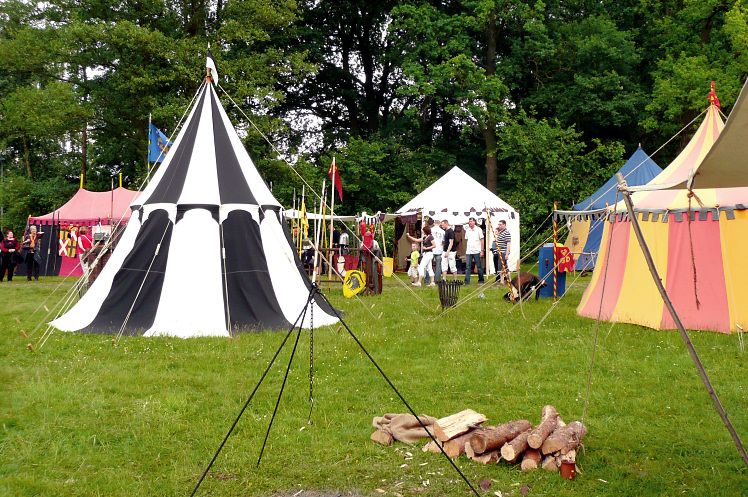
Inside the encampment

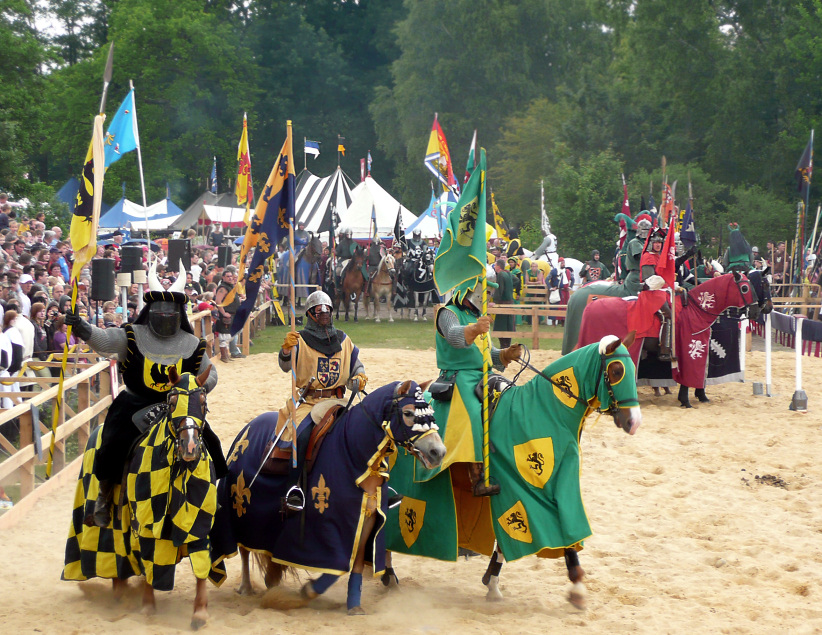
Jousting

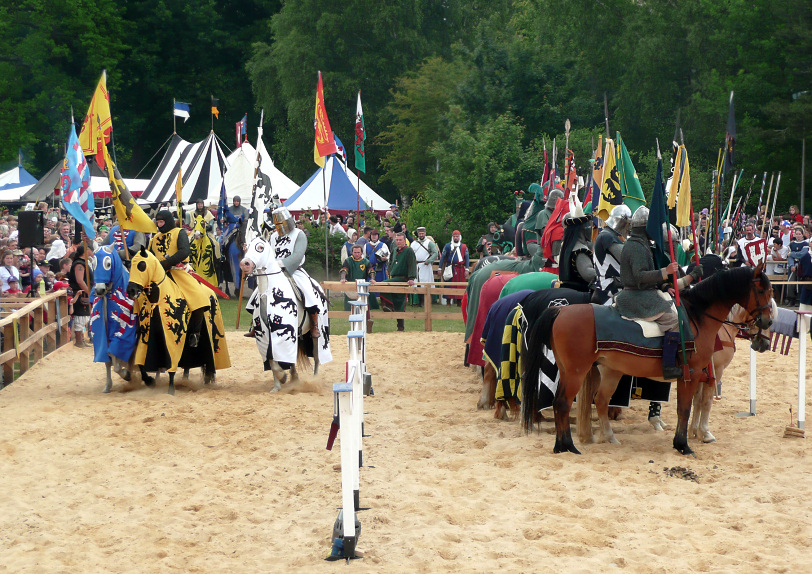
Parade of the knights

== Places of interest ==
- Tourist attractions include the extensive heaths of the Südheide Nature Park with its nature reserve, the Central Lüß Plateau Heathland (Tiefental)
- The Örtze with its ancient valley and canoe trips
- Watermill (Luttermühle) with an overshot water wheel near the mouth of the Weesener Bach into the Örtze, working since 1757 as a sawmill
- St. Peter and St. Paul's Church
- Great Cross Church (Große Kreuzkirche)
- Little Cross Church (Kleine Kreuzkirche)
- Ludwig Harms House, formerly the Old Mission House (Altes Missionshaus)
- New Stone Age Bonstorf Barrows, reconstructed
- Historic clay oven in a side street, near the Örtze, dating to 1630 according to the inscription on the beam
- Globe Well (Weltkugelbrunnen) made of black marble (weight: 2 ½ t) in front of the Old Mission House – unveiled in a ceremony on 19 June 2009. Its cost of €73,000 was almost exclusively paid for by donations. For €60,000 the forecourt was remodelled.
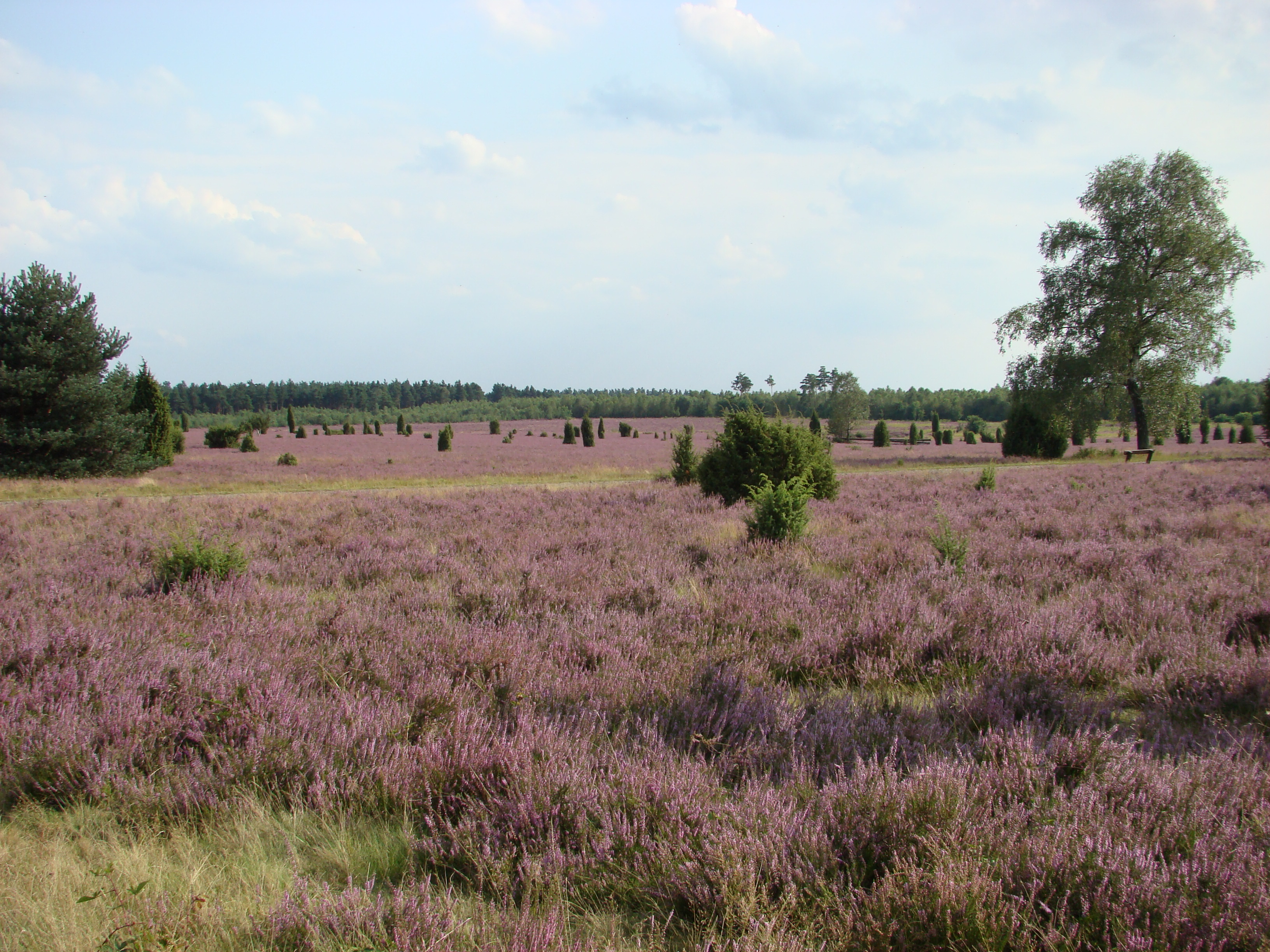
In the Tiefental valley during heath blossom time

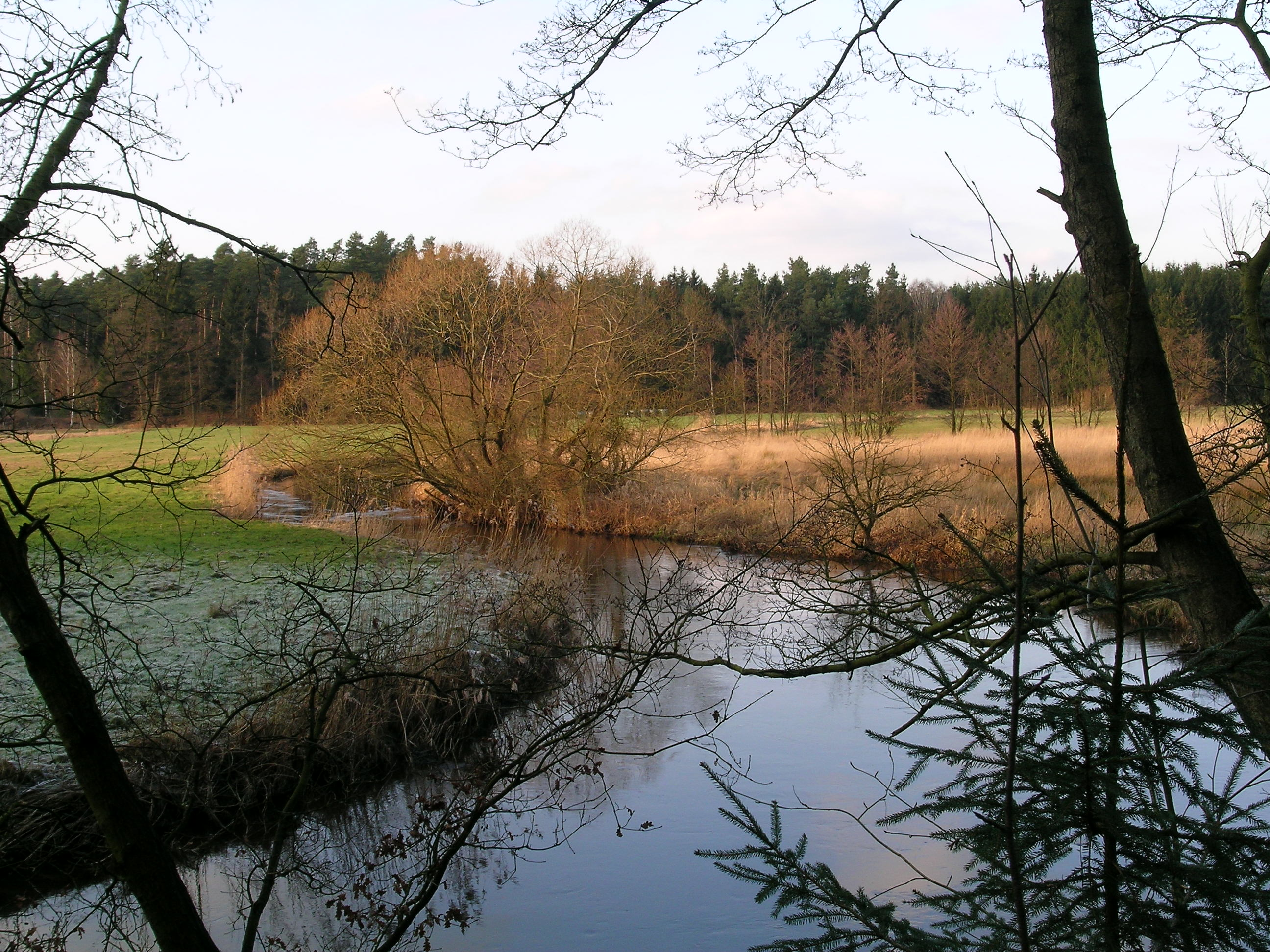
The Örtze

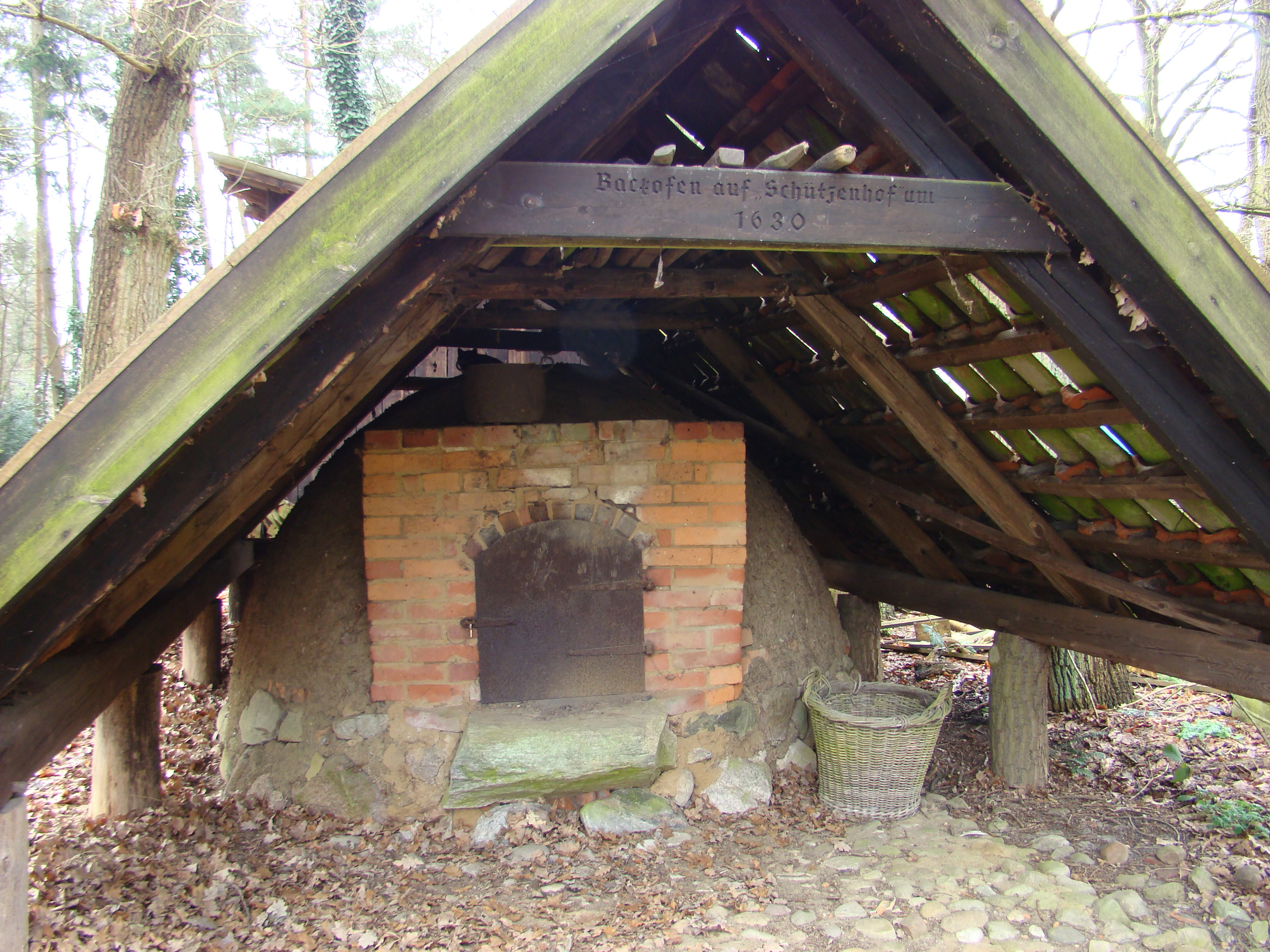
Historic clay oven dating to around 1630

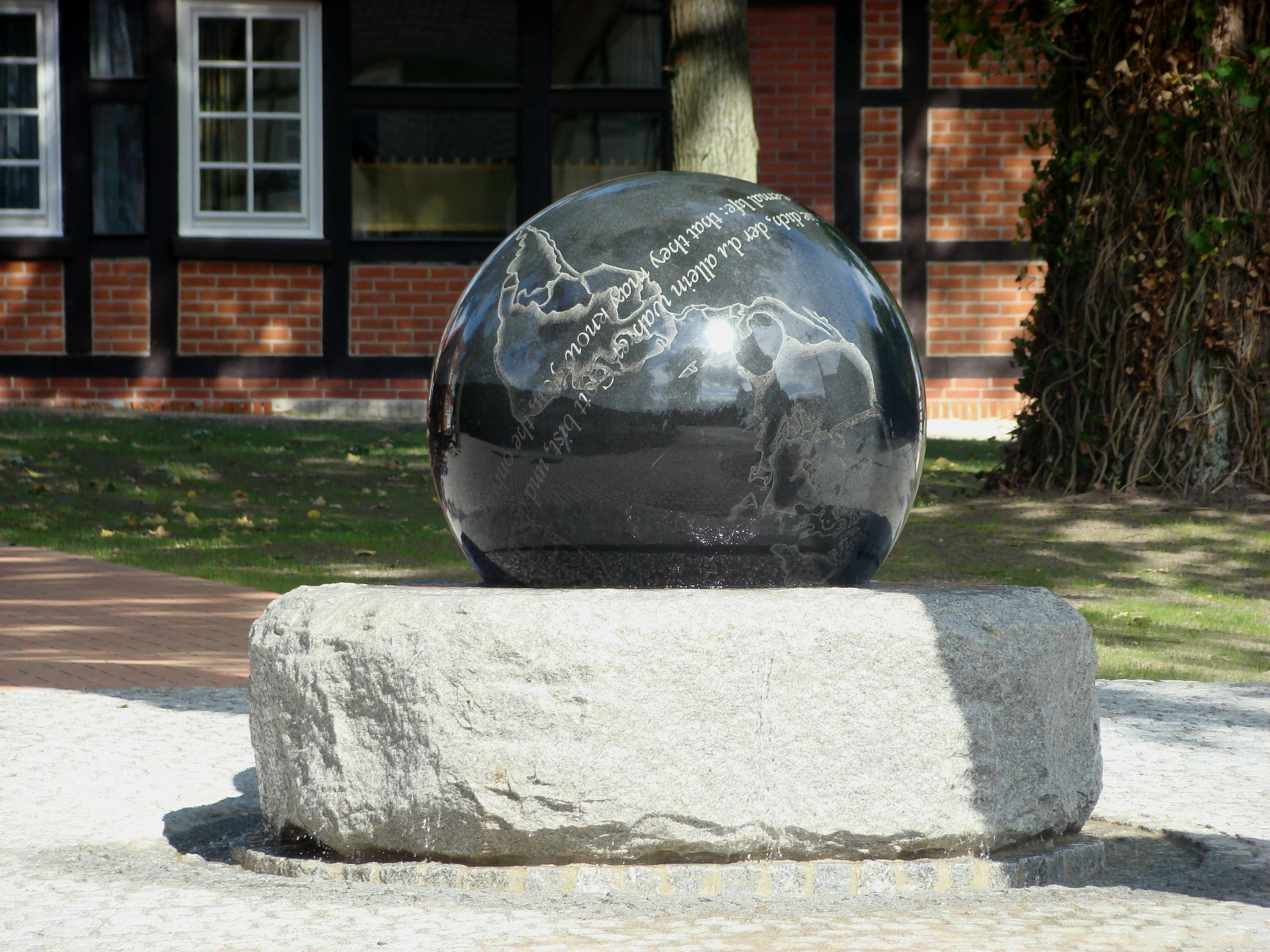
Globe Spring in front of the Old Mission House
