= Südheide (municipality) =

- Municipality
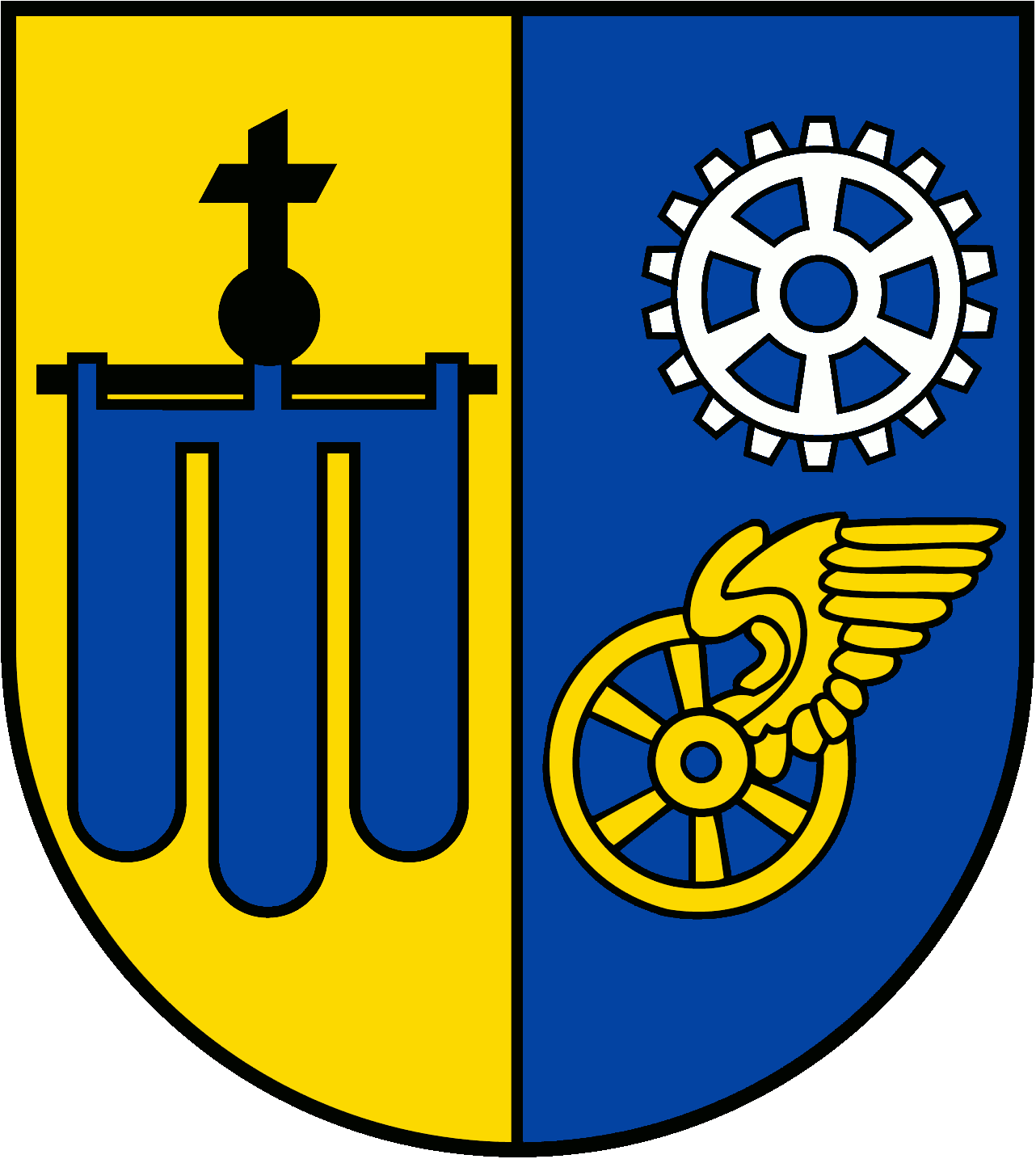
- Coat of arms

- Location of Südheide within Celle district
- Interactive map of Südheide
- Location within Germany Location within Lower Saxony
- Coordinates: 52°50′N 10°9′E
- Country: Germany
- State: Lower Saxony
- District: Celle

Government
  - Mayor (2021–26): Katharina Ebeling (CDU)

Area
  - Total: 196.5 km^{2} (75.9 sq mi)

Population (2025-12-31)
  - Total: 11,162
  - Density: 56.80/km^{2} (147.1/sq mi)
- Time zone: UTC+01:00 (CET)
  - Summer (DST): UTC+02:00 (CEST)
- Postal codes: 29303, 29320, 29345
- Dialling codes: 05052, 05827
- Vehicle registration: CE

Südheide (German pronunciation: [ˈzyːtˌhaɪdə], lit. 'Southern Heath') is a municipality in the district of Celle, in Lower Saxony, Germany. It takes its name from the heathland Südheide. It was formed on 1 January 2015 by the merger of the former municipalities Hermannsburg and Unterlüß.

The villages of Südheide are: Baven, Beckedorf, Bonstorf, Hermannsburg, Lutterloh, Oldendorf, Unterlüß, Weesen.
