= Drangmeister =

Drangmeister is a German surname.

== Origin and meaning ==
The name Drangmeister (less frequently used are the variants Drankmeister and Drangemeister) originates in the village of Endeholz (Scharnhorst municipality), Celle (district), Lower Saxony. This name, originally a sobriquet, is one of the oldest surnames of the rural area of Celle.

In the beginning there was a unique namebearer (see image below: Drancmester, approx. 1350, Endeholz).

In its early meaning of 'potion master' ([Middle High German] Dranc, Tranc or [Middle Low German] Drang, Drank = potion), the name stood for healer or manufacturer of medicinal beverages.

The documentary first mention of the name – about 1389 – is found in Stuart Jenks. A plague pandemic in Europe, the so-called Black Death (approx. 1350), had caused the allocation of the name.

== Distribution ==
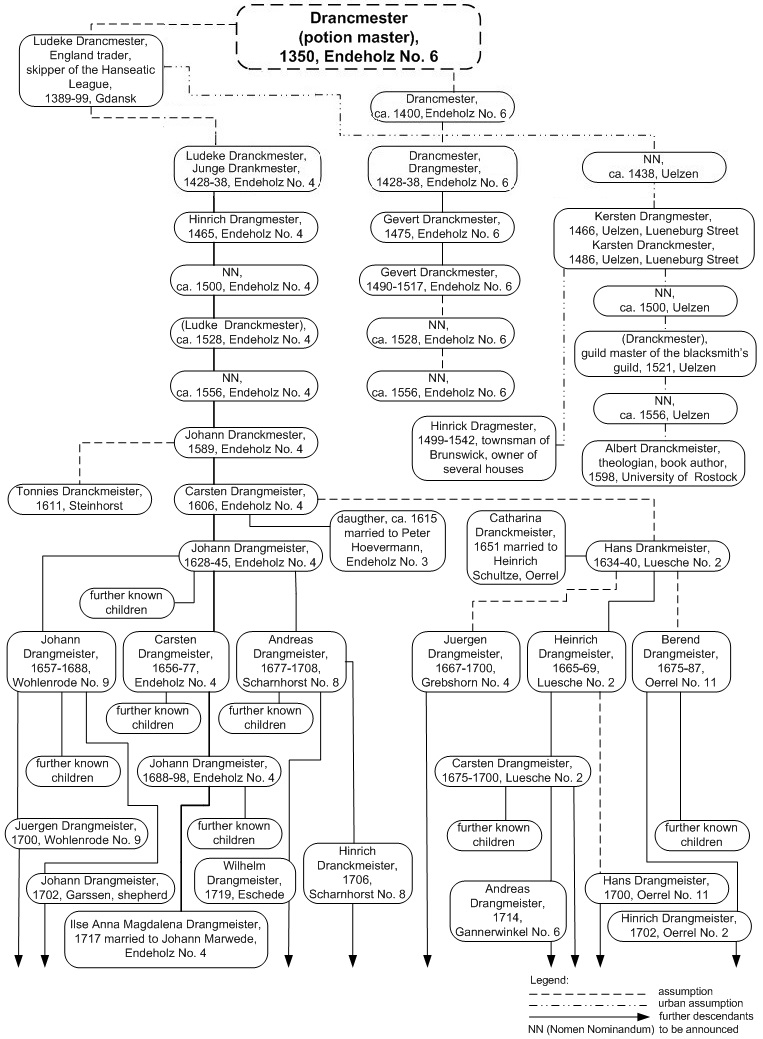
The distribution of the name Drangmeister from 1350 to 1700

Coming into use approximately in the year 1350 at the farmstead "Endeholz No. 6" the name Drangmeister had spread during the following 350 years as shown in the adjacent image – as far as namesakes could be determined for that period.

Even in 2011 there were about 75% of the approximately 350 known namesakes living within a circumradius of no more than 50 km (31 mi) length around the village of Endeholz.

The founder of the Drangmeister population of the United States, a Drangmeister native of Scharnhorst (a neighboring village of Endeholz), immigrated in the year 1854.

== Variants ==
In historical documents these spellings are found:

Drancmester, Dranckmester, Drangmester, Dragmester, Dragemester, Drankmester, Dranckmeister, Drangmeister, Drankmeister, Drangemeister, Dracmeister, Drancmeister, Dragmeister, Dragemeister, Trankmeister

Today's namesakes bear the name in the following forms:

Drangmeister, Drankmeister, Drangemeister

== Sources ==
- Rudolf Grieser: Das Schatzregister der Grossvogtei Celle von 1438 und andere Quellen zur Bevölkerungsgeschichte der Kreise Celle, Fallingbostel, Soltau und Burgdorf zwischen 1428 und 1442, Hildesheim und Leipzig 1934 (Nachdruck 1961)
- Stuart Jenks: England, die Hanse und Preußen: Handel und Diplomatie, 1377–1474, Band 1–3, Böhlau, Köln 1992
- Carl Koppmann (Hrsg.): Die Recesse und andere Akten der Hansetage von 1256–1430, Band 1–8, Leipzig 1870–1897
- Thomas Vogtherr (Hrsg.): Urkundenbuch der Stadt Uelzen, (= Lüneburger Urkundenbuch, 14. Abteilung), August Lax, Hildesheim 1988, ISBN 3-7848-3018-8
- Adolf Meyer, Hans Türschmann (Mitarbeit): Endeholz: Quellen und Darstellungen zur Geschichte des Dorfes und seiner Einwohner
- Kerstin Rahn: Religiöse Bruderschaften in der spätmittelalterlichen Stadt Braunschweig, Reichold, Hannover, Braunschweig 1994
