= Vierde =

- Ortsteil of Bad Fallingbostel
- Interactive map of Vierde
- Location within Germany Location within Lower Saxony
- Coordinates: 52°52′55″N 09°43′51″E
- Country: Germany
- State: Lower Saxony
- District: Soltau-Fallingbostel
- Town: Bad Fallingbostel

Population (2020)
  - Total: 200
- Time zone: UTC+01:00 (CET)
  - Summer (DST): UTC+02:00 (CEST)
- Postal codes: 29683
- Dialling codes: 05162

Vierde is a village within the borough of Bad Fallingbostel in Soltau-Fallingbostel district in the Heidmark (southern part of the Lüneburg Heath in the state of Lower Saxony, Northern Germany).

== Geographical location ==
The village lies on state road 163 northeast of Bad Fallingbostel.

== History ==
The first recorded mention of the village was around 1337. The name "Vierde" is derived from the four (vier) full-sized farms (Vollhöfen) that once formed the village of Vierde.

Vierde was an agricultural village for centuries and, for the most part, still is today. Until the 19th century the keeping of Heidschnucken (moorland sheep) was the main source of income for the heath farmers. Only once the hardpan could be dealt with it was possible to cultivate crops, like grain and fruit trees, in order to generate new sources of income.

Long established families are closely linked to the history and development of the village. The oldest surnames include: 1379: Ghogeue, 1438: Bode 1438: Niegemeiger, 1438: de rode Cordesche, 1438: Metteke, 1438: Detmer: 1438: Eggerdeschen stede woste, 1528: Hans Lethsemann, 1528: Cordt Pruschhagen, 1528: Cordt tom Kampe, 1528: Dirick 1528: Enmers, 1899: Oelfke. Large farms still bear witness to the development of these families today.

== Culture and Landscape ==
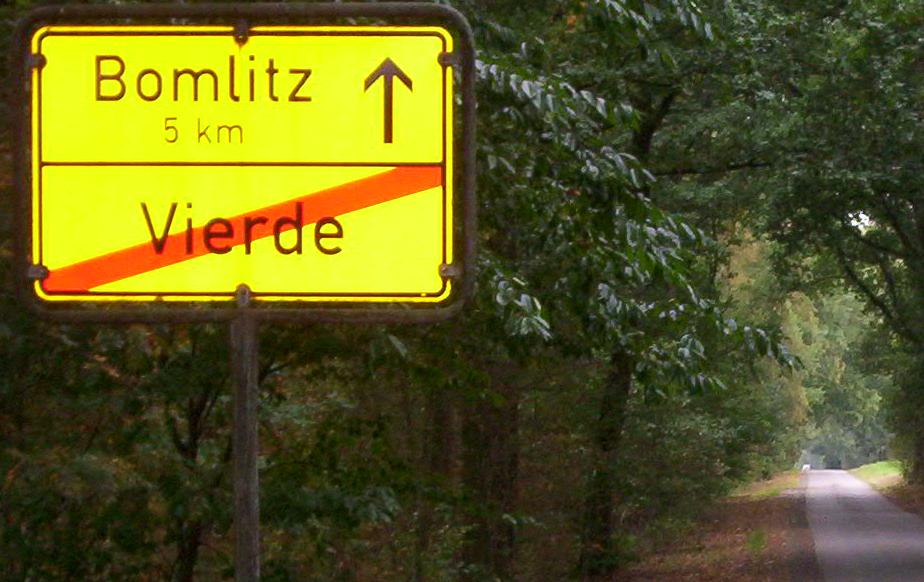
Vierde

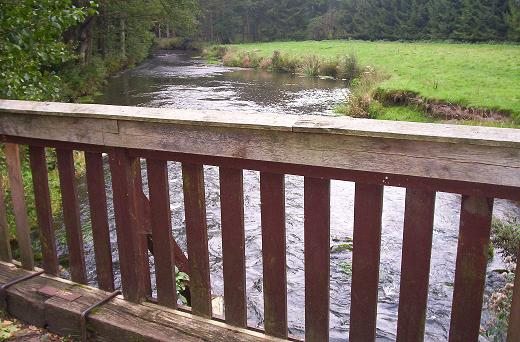
The Böhme near Vierde

As well as farming, the woods and the River Böhme, the Böhmeschlucht campsite, which is sited in the gorge of the same name, also stamps the character of Vierde. Vierde is located in the Heidmark, which was once the most beautiful part of the Lüneburg Heath. Large parts of the Heidmark were turned into a military training area in 1935/36 (nowadays the largest of its kind in Europe, the Bergen-Hohne Training Area), and numerous villages disappeared from the map.

The people of Vierde make an effort to work together to achieve cohesion, something which is seen as very important. The successful Adolphsheide-Vierde Shooting Club plays a significant role in bringing folk together.

== The legend of the Hexenberg ==
The legend of the Hexenberg in Vierde has been passed down for generations. According to the legend:

A witch used to live in the Papenhaus. One day she died. She was to be buried on the hill. So her coffin was loaded onto a cart. The horses sweated under the load. At Leitzmann's they could go no further. Suddenly something moved in the coffin. It was opened quickly and... a sow jumped out.

Since then, the hill has been called the Hexenberg ("witch's hill").

== Media ==
- Walsroder Zeitung

== Culture and places of interest ==
- Bronze Age gravesites

== Literature ==
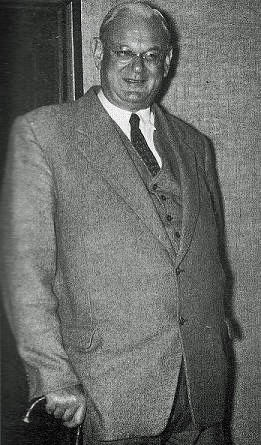
Hans Stuhlmacher, 1892-1962

- Hans Stuhlmacher: Der Kreis Fallingbostel. Walsrode 1935
