= Benhorn =

Coordinates: 52°47′43″N 9°44′06″E

Benhorn was a village in the old district of Fallingbostel, on the Heidmark in Lower Saxony in North Germany. It disappeared from the map in 1935/36, because the German Wehrmacht wanted to establish the Bergen-Hohne Training Area, today the largest military training area in Germany. The inhabitants were resettled.

== History ==
In 1330 Benhorn was mentioned in the records for the first time. The village is named after the settlement of Benno's tribe (Benno being a Lombard personal name). In this record the estate in Benhorn is already mentioned. The farmers lived mainly from the keeping of moorland sheep, known as Heidschnucken, and from beekeeping.

Ancient oral tradition describes the region around Benhorn towards the east (as far as the Sieben Steinhäuser) as the most beautiful and primitive heathland in the eastern Heidmark.

At the time of its resettlement the population of Benhorn and the neighbouring hamlet of Ettenbostel was 173.

== Sources ==
- Hans Stuhlmacher: Die Heidmark. Schneeheide 1939
- Hinrich Baumann: Die Heidmark – Wandel einer Landschaft. Die Geschichte des Truppenübungsplatzes Bergen. 2006
