= Heidmark =

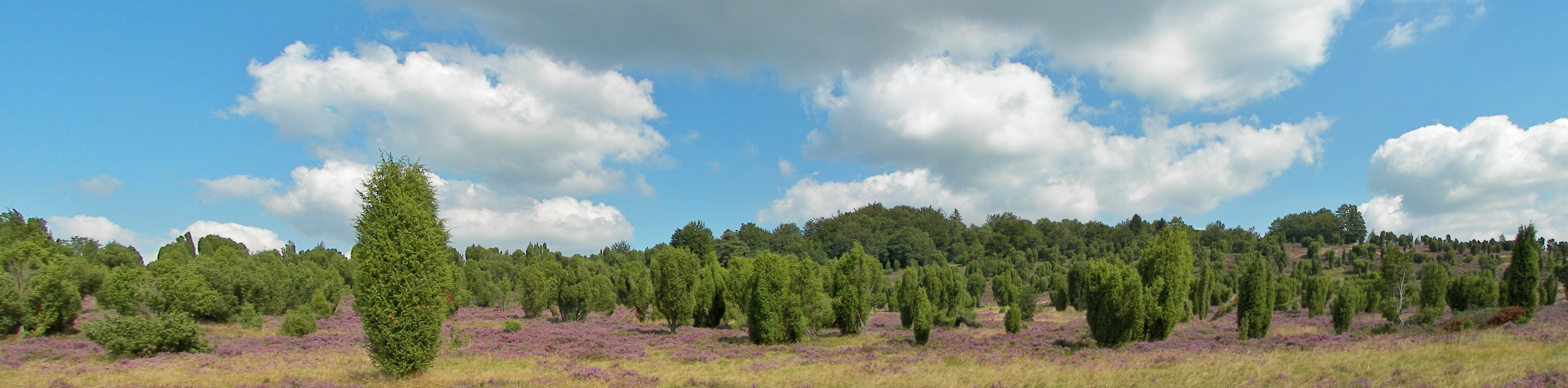
The Heidmark

The Heidmark (German pronunciation: [ˈhaɪtˌmaʁk]) is an area of the Lüneburg Heath, much of which has not been accessible to the population since about 1935–1936. The establishment of a large military training area (Truppenübungsplatzes Bergen) by the German armed forces, the Wehrmacht, as part of their rearmament and preparation for war resulted in the evacuation of 24 villages and, since then the training area has been out-of-bounds to non-military personnel. Today it has become the Bergen-Hohne Training Area, the largest of its kind in Europe.

== Geographical location of the Heidmark ==
The region of 'Heytmarke' was recorded in the Celle Vogtei registers as early as the 15th century. It belonged to the district office (Amtsvogtei) of Fallingbostel and comprised the parishes of Fallingbostel, Dorfmark, Meinerdingen and Düshorn including Ostenholz. Today it refers to the region between Fallingbostel, Soltau and Bergen which, since the creation of the military training area in 1935–1936 has been largely closed to the public. The centre point of the Heidmark was Fallingbostel.

== History of the Heidmark ==
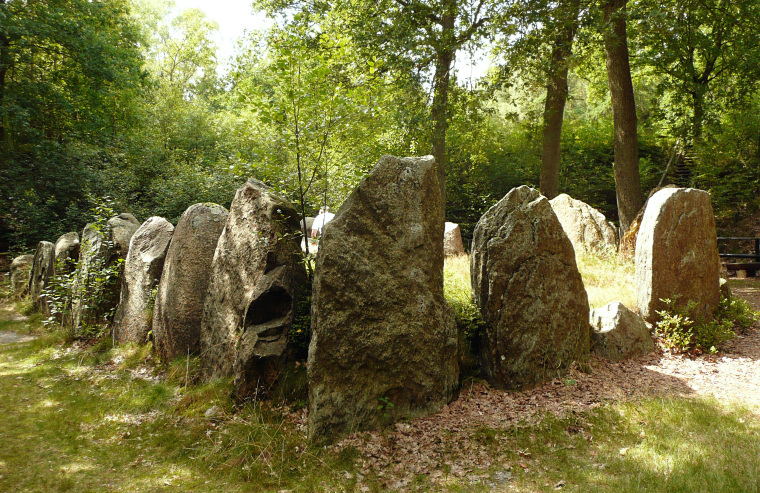
Grave D at the Sieben Steinhäuser

The folk in the area around the Sieben Steinhäuser and the Falkenberg suffered much during the Thirty Years War, especially in those villages that lay on the routes taken by the Army. The life of its farmers was for a long time dependent on sheep farming, but this faded into the background during the first half of the 19th century; the whole landscape changed and fields were cultivated on the heathland with its loamy, sandy soils. The herds of moorland sheep, the Heidschnucke, disappeared as the tracts of heathland were afforested and made way for plantations of beech, oak and spruce, resulting in the emergence of mixed woods. Many attempts were made in the eastern Heidmark to make economic progress. The discovery of artificial fertiliser enabled the heathland farmers to become genuinely self-sufficient. They earned more income from their fields and were able to sell grain and fruit.

Crafts were an important source of income and employment in the Heidmark. It was especially common in Oerbke where there were numerous lines of work. As well as the farming and estate families, tradesmen also settled in the Heidmark and built estate houses and manor houses. In 2007 many of these manorial building are still standing. There are small village schools in the Heidmark, as well as several parishes and numerous societies.

When the 'relocation' took place from 1935 to 1938 in order to make way for a military training area for the Wehrmacht, entire villages disappeared forever from the map. Many people from the Heidmark had to leave their family homes which their families had lived in for centuries.

=== Seasonal migration to Holland ===
The heathland farmers lacked meadows and pastures. In order to ensure their economic survival, early on they had to acquire pastureland in the "Krelinger Bruch" far from their farmsteads, as can be seen from the register of wills of 1667. At harvest time they had to stay in the Bruch until all the hay was dry. That could take two weeks or more.

"Holland trippers" (Hollandgänger) were also mentioned in the records from 1786. These folk shouldered their scythes and left in May on foot for Holland in order to mow in return for payment. The majority of these Hollandgänger were day labourers (Häuslinge) and were told to go and earn this extra income. After 1850 these trips to Holland gradually died away. The last "Holland tripper" from the eastern Heidmark is mentioned in the documents in 1865.

=== Hunting in the Heidmark ===
In ancient times, in addition to the ruler (the duke), the nobility had hunting rights in the Heidmark. The chief hunting rights in the Heidmark were granted to the von der Wense and von Hodenberg families.

In the register of wills in 1667 it says:

"Moreover, the von der Wense family have the freedom to shoot and have brought down deer and wild boar in their spruce forests, from which most noble lords are also not excluded. They may also, as far as their law and tradition allows, go hunting with the Strickjagd. The von Hodenbergs at Hudemühlen are entitled to bring down deer and wild boar in their own forests, but only permitted to use Strickjagd in the Amstvogtei of Fallingbostel, as far as their authority allows. And they may keep stores with their farmers and therefore attend the hunt twice a year, once in the grass season (between Easter and Midsummer) and once in the hay season (between Michaelmas and Christmas)... "

The farmers of the Heidmark, for whom hunting "was inherited from the blood of their forebears", as tradition has it, would have reimbursed themselves. They poached whenever they could. That was considered an unwritten right and not as a sin. Nevertheless, the gendarmes had to track down the poachers and hand them over to the courts.

=== Justice in the Heidmark ===
Tradition has it that once Goding (thingsteads or Gogerichte) and Holting (forest courts or Holzgerichte) were convened in Dorfmark, Fallingbostel, Ostenholz and at the Heidhof. At the Heidhof sentences were passed in the manner of a vehmic court (Femegerichte). The last execution in the Heidmark was in 1777. However that has been passed by word of mouth from generation to generation, because the documents associated with it were destroyed in a fire in 1784. Over centuries it has been reported that the owner of the Jacobshof in Ahlften, Johann Hinrich Apenriep, who came from Castens Hof in Meimen, had collected the executioner, Holdorf, from Lüneburg and had driven him to Fallingbostel. Holdrof had then beheaded a woman or a girl.

=== Church parishes in the Heidmark ===
For a very long time the lives of the heath farmers were closely linked to the churches. A deed by the Emperor, Otto III, of 7 May 986 documents that there were already churches and abbeys in Walsrode and Ahlden at that time. The church at Dorfmark was first mentioned in 1006. The other parishes were not mentioned in the records until later, however. For example: Schwarmstedt was first mentioned in 1221, Düshorn in 1230, Meinerdingen in 1269 and Bierde in the 15th century, but were probably established long before then.

The inhabitants of the Heidmark went through the Reformation in the reign of Duke Ernest the Confessor who had accepted Lutheran teaching early on. There were and are many churches and parishes in the Heidmark. These Evangelical-Lutheran parishes were and, to some extent still are, meeting places for the community.

=== The Heidmark in other names ===
- In Bad Fallingbostel there is a Heidmarkstraße.

=== Culture and places of interest ===
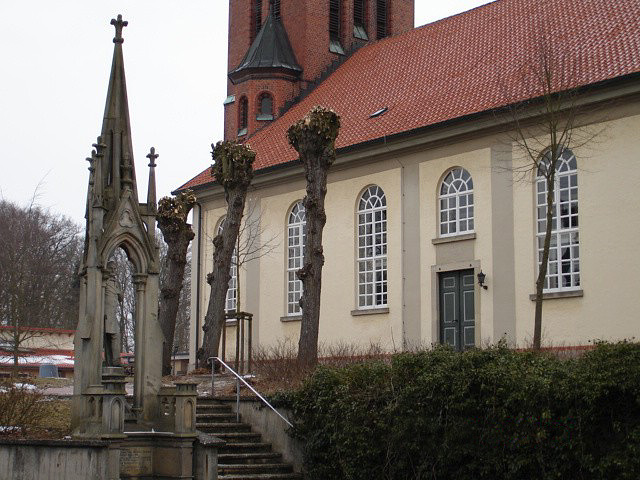
Monument to Heinrich von Quintus Icilius (1864)

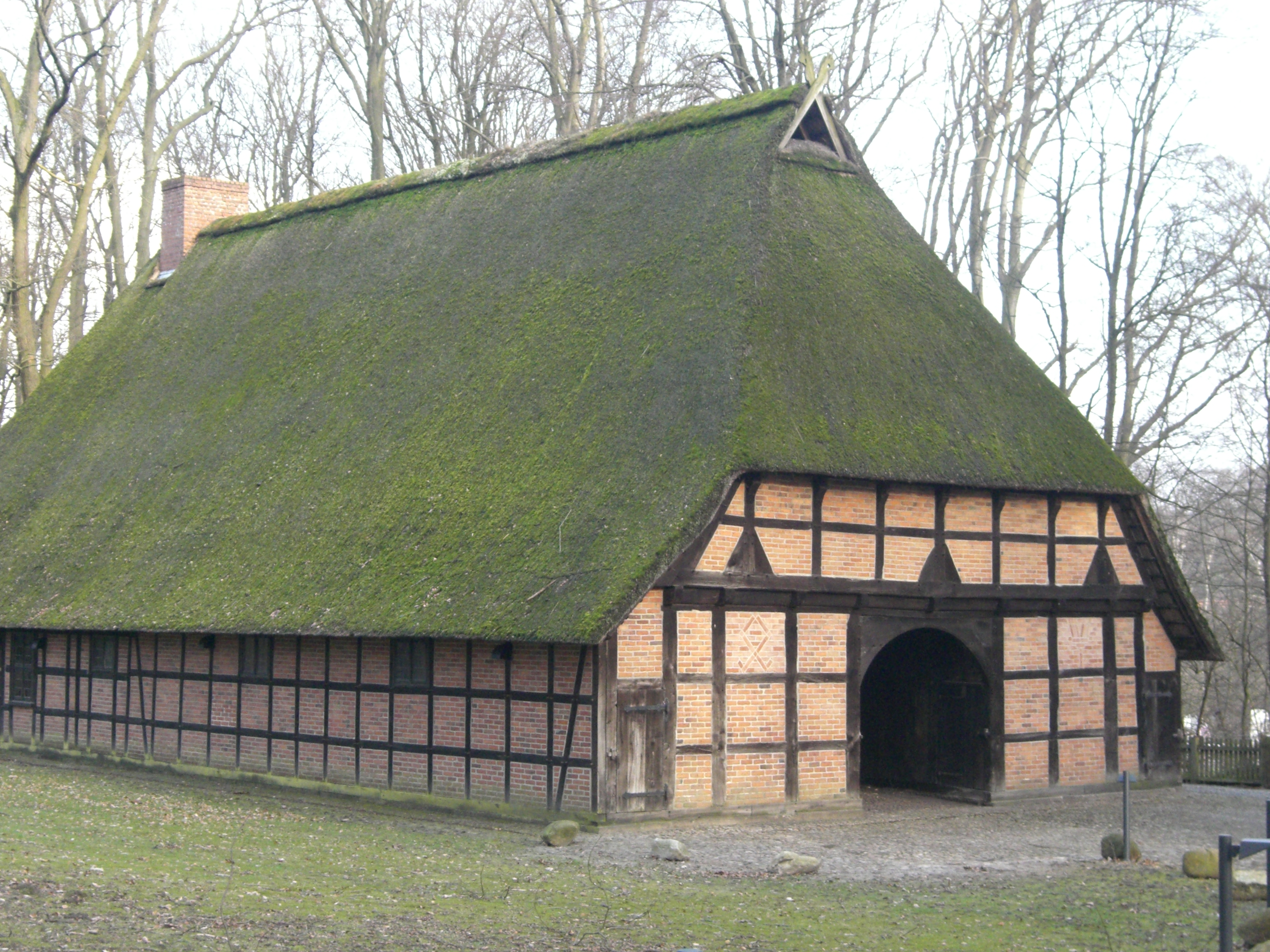
Farmhouse on the Heidmark in an old Fachhallenhaus

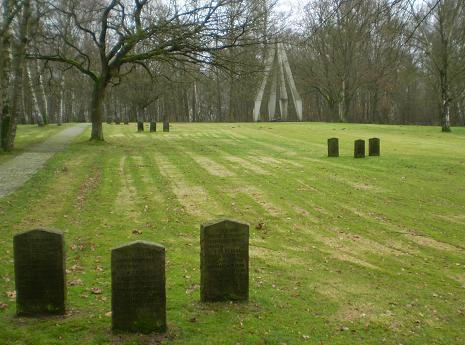
Cemetery of the Unknown Soldiers

- in Bad Fallingbostel:
  - the Heidmarkhalle
  - Museum of the Archaeological Society (Archäologischen Arbeitsgemeinschaft e.V.).
    In the Megalithpark Osterberg large stones are exhibited, that were pushed into the Heidmark from Scandinavia by massive ice sheets during the ice ages.
  - the Hof der Heidmark farmhouse with Rummelsburg Heimatstube, a Low German house in the Liethwald
  - the Protestant St. Dionysius Church in the town centre
  - the Quintus monument at St. Dionysius Church
- in Oerbke:
  - Cemetery of the Unknown Soldiers (Friedhof der Namenlosen), a war cemetery in which around 30,000 Russian prisoners-of-war from the Second World War are buried in mass graves
- in and near Ostenholz:
  - Timber-framed church with a wooden tower dating from 1724
  - Hoher Stein, a memorial to the evacuation of the villages in 1936 when the Nazi military training area was created
  - the Sieben Steinhäuser, neolithic dolmens in the south of the military training area
- in Wense:
  - Estate church (Gutskapelle), a splendid church dating from 1558
- in Vierde:
  - Bronze Age gravesite.
- in Dorfmark:
  - the Protestant St. Martin's Church
  - the grave of Erich von Manstein
- in Fahrenholz
- Bronze Age tumuli
- Neolithic dolmen just before Krelingen

== Sources ==
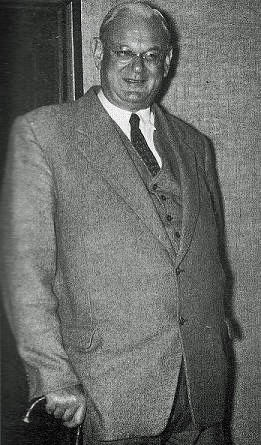
Hans Stuhlmacher

== Literature ==
- Hans Stuhlmacher: "Die Heidmark". 1939, Schneeheide. Verlag: C.V. Engelhard & Co.GmbH, Hannover
- Hans Stuhlmacher: "Der Kreis Fallingbostel", 1935, Schneeheide, Verlag: Fritz Drescher, Möser bei Magdeburg, Druck: J. Gronemanns Buch-und Kunstdruckerei, Verlag der Walsroder Zeitung, Walsrode
