= Stuhlmacher =

Stuhlmacher (German for chair-maker) is a German surname. Notable people with the surname include:

- Hans Stuhlmacher (1892–1962), German pedagogue, Wehrmacht officer and local historian
- Peter Stuhlmacher (1932–2025), German Protestant theologian, biblical scholar and author
