= Wense (Osterheide) =

Coordinates: 52°55′12″N 9°49′00″E

Wense is a village in the Heidmark in Lower Saxony, Germany. In 1935/1936 its inhabitants were 'relocated', because the German armed forces, the Wehrmacht, wanted to establish a vast military training area in the Heidmark, which today is the largest in Europe (see Bergen-Hohne Training Area).

Nowadays, Wense is in the unincorporated area of Osterheide.

== History ==
For centuries Wense was dominated by the von der Wense family. This family was first mentioned in the records in AD 1322. At that time they purchased land from the Walsrode monastery and settled there. The family owned the so-called Ohlehof farm near Wense and the Dorfmark Estate (Gut Dorfmark).

At the time of its relocation Wense had 148 inhabitants. Today just 13 people live there. Even the von der Wense family was given a new life, at another village in the vicinity of Hamburg.

== Sources ==
- Hans Stuhlmacher: Die Heidmark. Verlag C.M. Gengelhard & Co., Hannover 1939
