= Oerbke =

Coordinates: 52°51′10″N 9°43′48″E

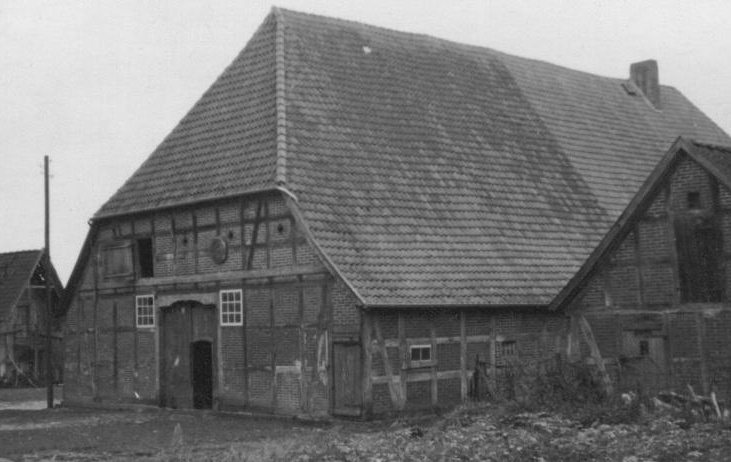
The Oelfkenhof in Oerbke in 1954

Oerbke is an unincorporated German village in Soltau-Fallingbostel district in the southern part of the Lüneburg Heath in Lower Saxony. Oerbke lies on the A7 autobahn east of Bad Fallingbostel and is the seat of administration for the Osterheide area.

== History ==
The farming village of Oerbke was first mentioned in the surviving records in 1256 and, by 1438, there were 8 farmsteads reported in the area as well as 4 individual houses (Kotstellen). The farms and houses were also evident in the registers in 1563, 1589 and 1628, so they were very long-lived here, probably due to the fertile soil. Until 1935 the village had been a purely agricultural settlement for centuries.

During the Third Reich the German armed forces, the Wehrmacht established a prisoner-of-war camp in Oerbke in which up to 30,000 soldiers from the Red Army were housed. After 1945 Oerbke Camp was initially used by the British Forces as a detention centre and displaced persons camp. Later the Oerbke East settlement (Ostsiedlung Oerbke) was used for troops exercising on the Bergen-Hohne Training Area.

=== Family names ===
Closely linked to the history and development of the village are long-established families. The oldest family names include:

- 1379: henneke hoyers, Odde, henneke luders
- 1438: Ludeke in deme Broke, Olveke, Sandman, Hermen Lange, Ghildehus, Hermen Hoyers, Eggerd in der Koten, Henneke Odden, Tideke Ebeling, Hinrik Hoyers, Henneke Luders
- 1528: Jacob im Broke, Carsten Hoyger, Roders, Olücke, Hinrick Odden, Marthinß, Laurentius, Bartolt Lüders, Peter, Hans Wobbeken

== Cultural monuments ==
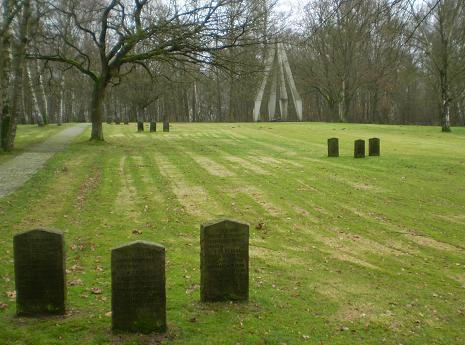
Cemetery of the Unknown Soldiers

- Cemetery of the Unknown Soldiers (Friedhof der Namenlosen), a war cemetery in which about 30,000 Russian prisoners-of-war from the Second World War are buried in mass graves.
