= Belsen (Bergen) =

- Ortsteil of Bergen
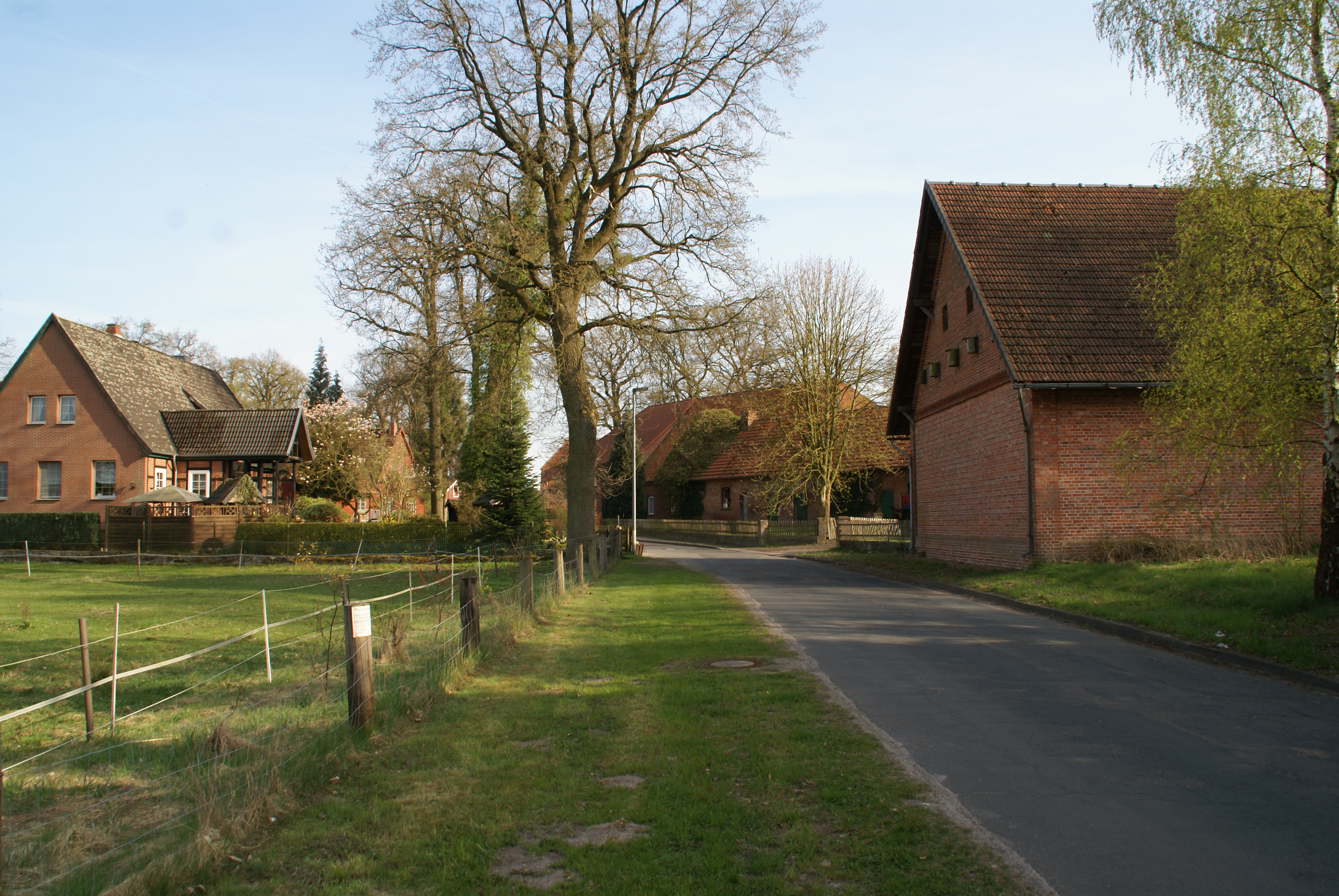
- Typical farms in the Im alten Dorf road
- Interactive map of Belsen
- Location within Germany Location within Lower Saxony
- Coordinates: 52°47′9″N 9°56′12″E
- Country: Germany
- State: Lower Saxony
- District: Celle
- Town: Bergen

Population (2019)
  - Total: 260
- Time zone: UTC+01:00 (CET)
  - Summer (DST): UTC+02:00 (CEST)
- Postal codes: 29303
- Dialling codes: 05051

Belsen (German pronunciation: [ˈbɛlzn̩]) is a village within the German borough of Bergen in the northern part of Celle district on the Lüneburg Heath in Lower Saxony. The village, whose original site lies about 3 kilometres (1.9 mi) southwest of Bergen, has 331 inhabitants (as at: 31 December 2000). The Belsen concentration camp was named after it. Today Belsen is dominated by the former British Army camp of Hohne (German: Lager Hohne) on the edge of the NATO firing ranges.

== History ==
Belsen was first mentioned in the records in 1235 under the name Bellenhusen. Formerly an independent municipality, it is part of the town Bergen since 1971.

=== Bergen-Belsen concentration camp ===
The Bergen-Belsen concentration camp was near Belsen. The site of the former concentration camp and the present-day Bergen-Belsen Memorial Centre are mainly within the municipality of Winsen (Aller) and its parish of Walle (Winsen). Between Bergen and Belsen, there were railway ramps onto which prisoners from the incoming goods wagons alighted and from where they had to cover the remaining distance of about 4 kilometres (2.5 mi) to the camp on foot. The original ramps have been replaced and the current ramps are used today to off-load military vehicles of the British, Dutch, French, German, Belgian, Luxembourg and Polish forces in order to take part in exercises on the NATO military training area of Bergen-Hohne.

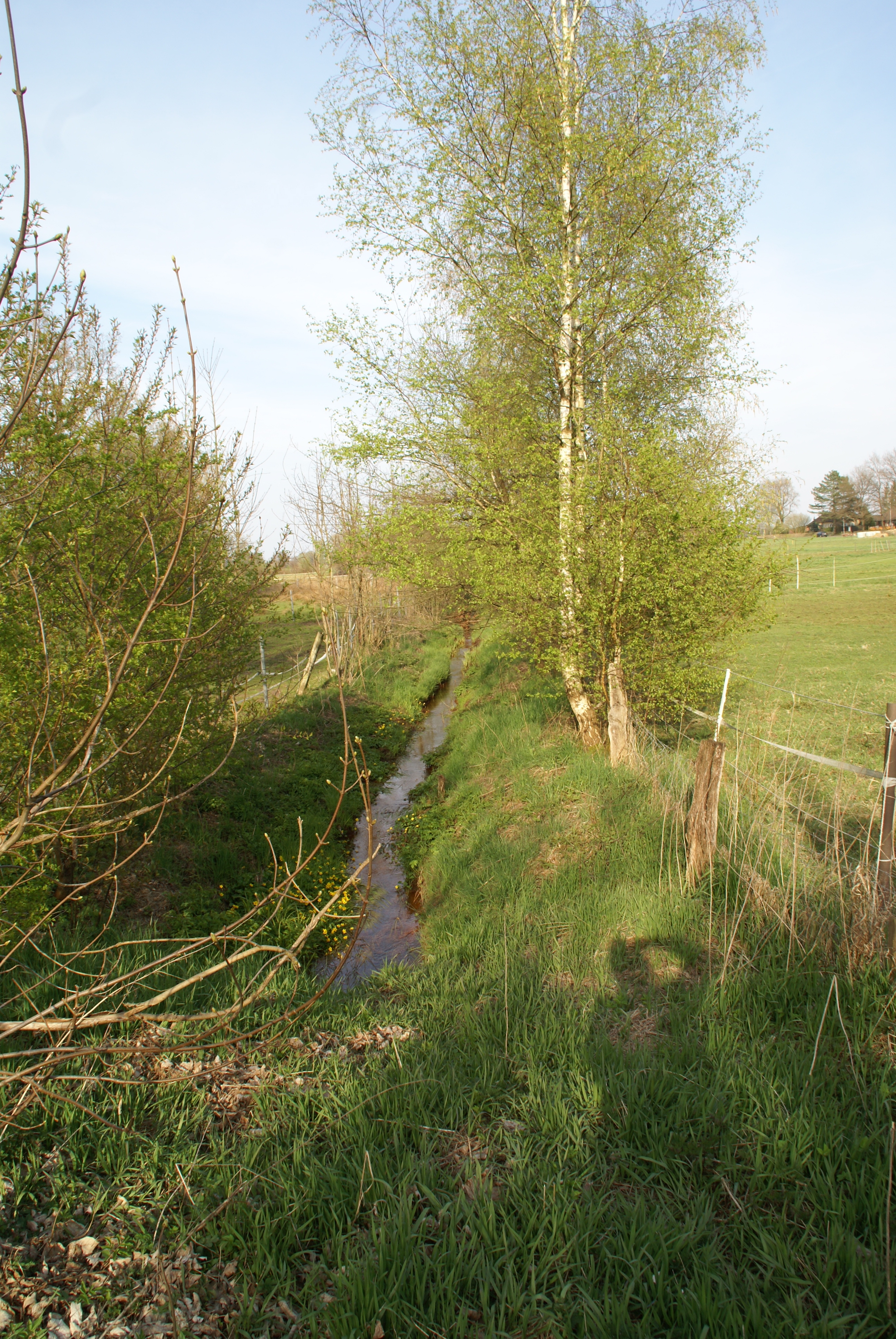
The river Fuchsmoorgraben

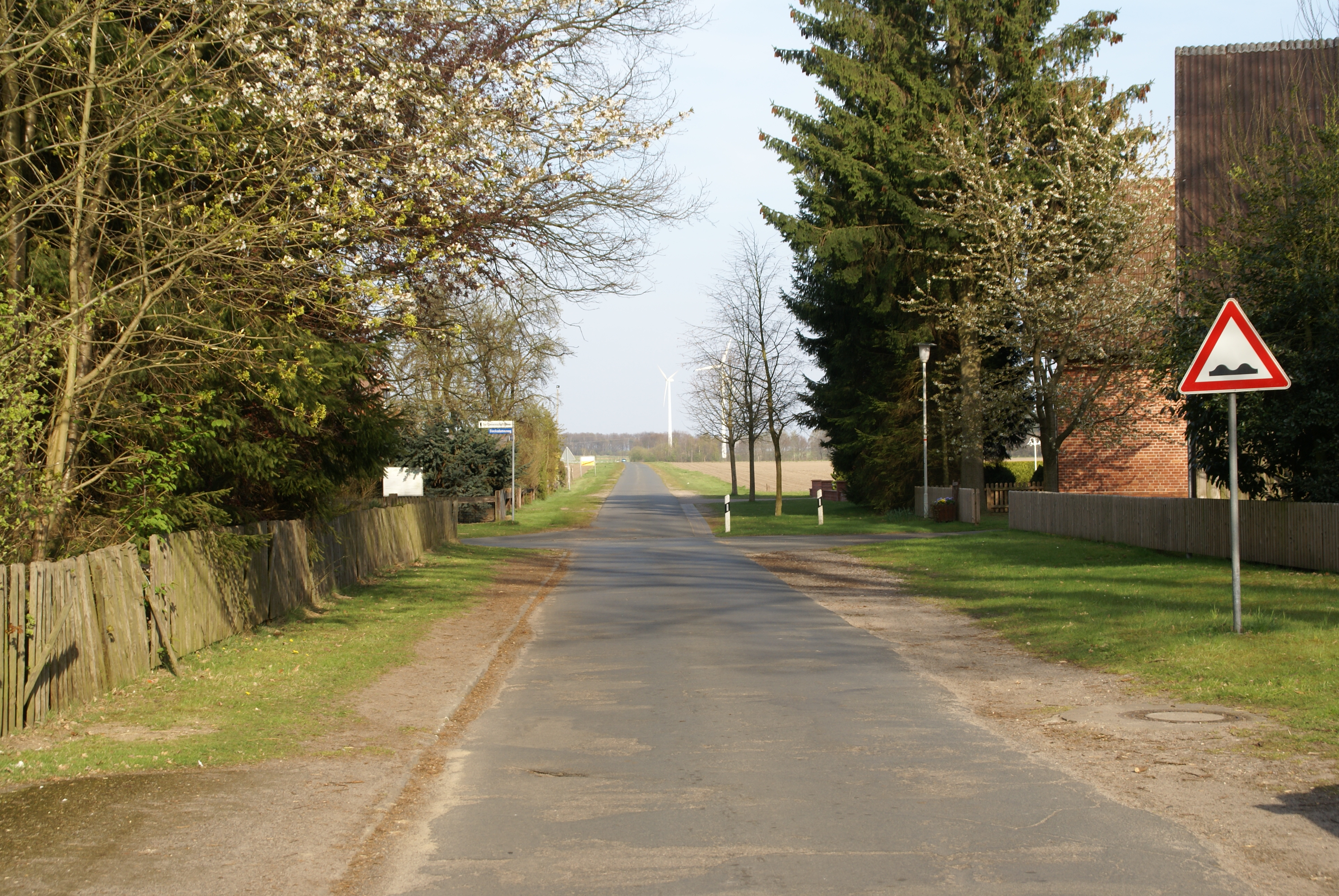
The crossing of the Diecksdammweg and the Im alten Dorf roads

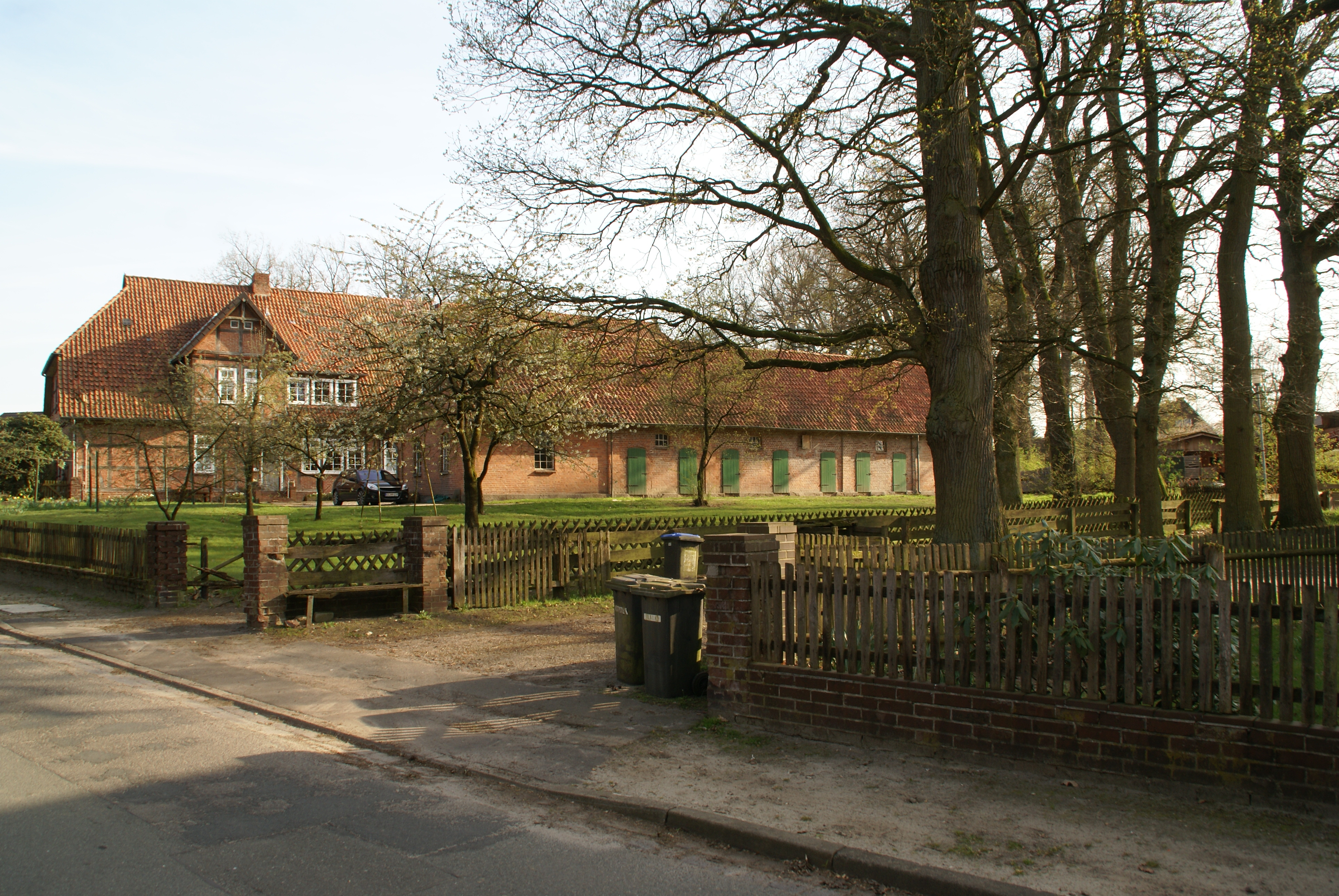
Farm

=== Bergen-Belsen displaced persons camp ===
After the Second World War, a displaced persons (DP) camp was created in the military base of Lager Hohne (called Bergen-Hohne Station or Hohne Camp during its British tenure), opposite the village. Called the Bergen-Belsen displaced persons camp. It was in operation from the summer of 1945 until September 1950. For a time, Belsen DP camp was the largest Jewish DP camp in Germany and the only one in the British occupation zone with an exclusively Jewish population.

== Politics and administration ==
Since the merging of local councils as part of the Lower Saxon administrative reforms of 1971, Belsen has been part of the borough of Bergen. Belsen is represented by a local council (Ortsrat) and a chairman (Ortsbürgermeister). The council is empowered, inter alia, to make decisions about public services in the village, is responsible for maintaining the appearance of the village and for overseeing its clubs and societies, and has to be consulted by the town of Bergen on all important matters affecting the village. It consists of five elected representatives who, together with the chairman, sit on the Bergen town council. The village council elects its own chairman. The current incumbent is Sven Marquardt.

== See also ==
- de:Arbeitsgemeinschaft Bergen-Belsen, The Bergen-Belsen Society

== Literature ==
- Friedrich Barenscheer u.a., Bauernbuch, o.J. (about 1935). In the Bergen Town Archives (Stadtarchiv Bergen)
- Quellensammlung zur Ortsgeschichte Belsen, In the Bergen Town Archives
- Lehnsbriefe über Belehnung der Mühle Belsen, (from 1554), In the Bergen Town Archives
