= Osterheide =

- Unincorporated area
- Location of Osterheide within Heidekreis district
- Interactive map of Osterheide
- Location within Germany Location within Lower Saxony
- Coordinates: 52°51′N 9°44′E
- Country: Germany
- State: Lower Saxony
- District: Heidekreis

Government
  - Mayor: Andreas Ege

Area
  - Total: 179 km^{2} (69 sq mi)
- Elevation: 62 m (203 ft)

Population (2025-12-31)
  - Total: 414
  - Density: 2.31/km^{2} (5.99/sq mi)
- Time zone: UTC+01:00 (CET)
  - Summer (DST): UTC+02:00 (CEST)
- Dialling codes: 05163, 05167
- Vehicle registration: HK

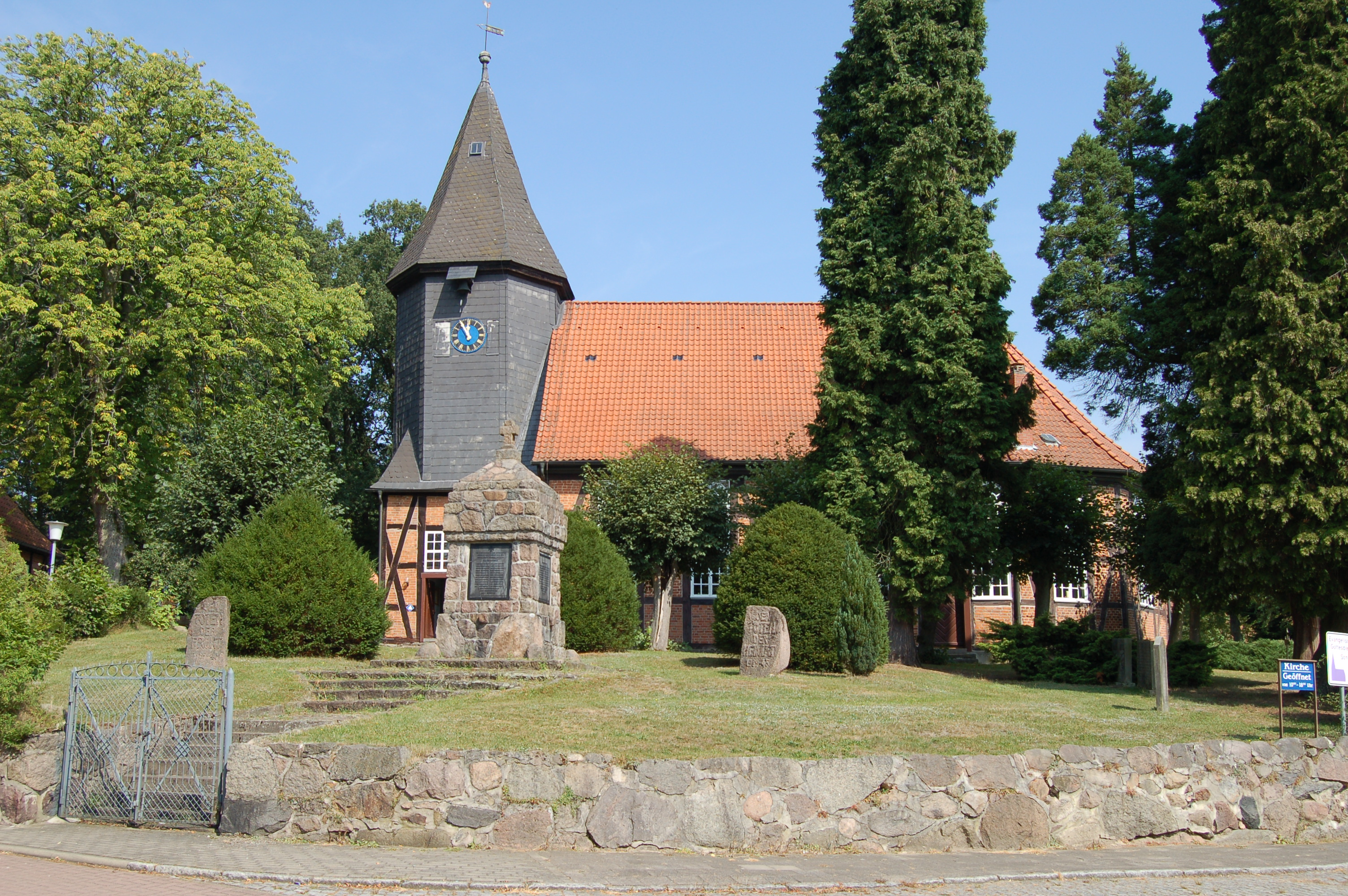
Church Ostenholz

Osterheide (German pronunciation: [ˈoːstɐˌhaɪdə]) is an unincorporated area in the district of Heidekreis, in Lower Saxony, Germany.

The 177.99 square kilometres (68.72 sq mi) area has 2,463 inhabitants (as at 31 December 2020). Its administrative seat is the village of Oerbke; other villages are Ostenholz and Wense. The districts of Osterheide and Lohheide cover the Bergen-Hohne Military Training Area.

== History ==
In 1935 the German armed forces, the Wehrmacht, established the military training area of Bergen between Bergen and Fallingbostel. A total of 24 villages were evacuated and their inhabitants relocated. In 1938 the Bergen Area Estate (Gutsbezirk Platz Bergen) was created to administer the training area and it was subordinated to Fallingbostel district. In 1945 the Gutsbezirk was split into two independent areas, known as the Osterheide and Lohheide Estates. Osterheide remained part of Fallingbostel district, whilst Lohheide was re-subordinated again to Celle district. Today Osterheide covers the NATO Bergen-Hohne firing ranges in Heidekreis district which were established in 1958.

== Legal status ==
According to § 16 of the Lower Saxony Municipality Regulations (NGO) the management of unincorporated or unparished areas is to be governed by a regulation. The extant version of this regulation was issued on 4 December 1996. This states that "the delivery of public services for the area's sphere of activity is the responsibility of the land owner" which in the case of Lohheide and Osterheide, is the Federal Government. The constitution of an unincorporated area is different from that of a municipality. Its instruments are the district principal (Bezirksvorsteher) and a council of elected representatives of the inhabitants. The mayor is proposed by the land owners and then elected by the council. The participation rights of the inhabitants are limited to the election of representatives as well as the opportunity to ask questions and listen to the public proceedings of the council.

== Cultural monuments and places of interest ==
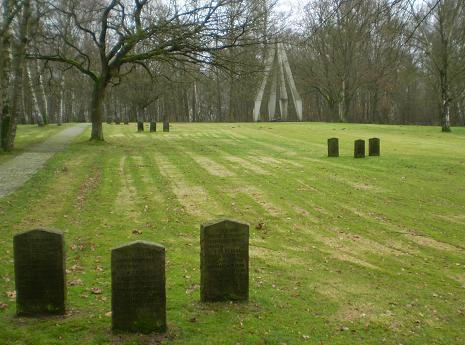
Cemetery of the Unknown Soldiers in Oerbke

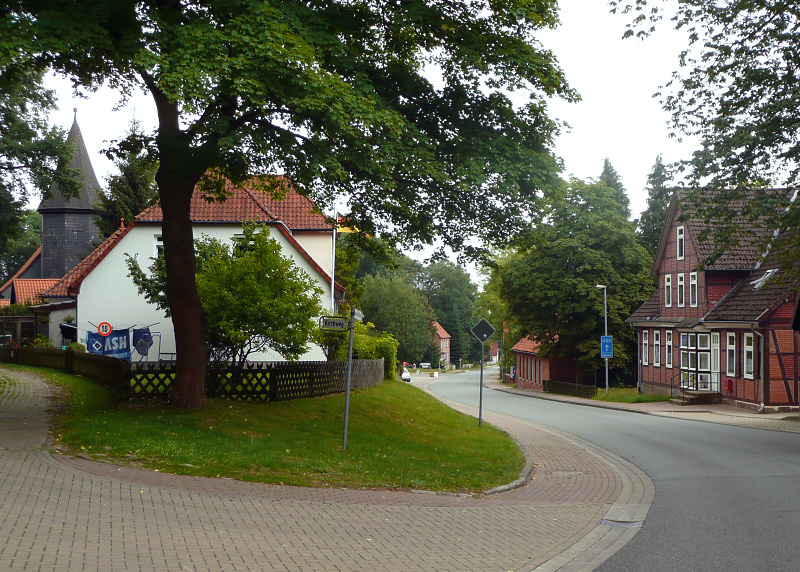
Ostenholz

Amongst the cultural monuments and places of interest in and around Osterheide are:

- in Oerbke (west):
  - Cemetery of the Unknown Soldiers (German:Friedhof der Namenlosen), a war cemetery, in which around 30,000 Soviet prisoners-of-war from the Second World War are buried in mass graves
- in and around Ostenholz' (southwest):
  - Timber-framed church with wooden tower dating from 1724
  - Hoher Stein, a monument in memory of the communities evacuated in 1936 in order to establish the military training area
  - Sieben Steinhäuser (literally: "Seven Stone Houses"), Neolithic dolmens in the south of the training area
- in Wense (northwest):
  - The estate chapel (Gutskapelle), a splendid church dating from 1558
