= Lohheide =

- Unincorporated area
- Location of Lohheide within Celle district
- Interactive map of Lohheide
- Location within Germany Location within Lower Saxony
- Coordinates: 52°50′N 9°50′E
- Country: Germany
- State: Lower Saxony
- District: Celle

Government
  - Mayor: Wilhelm Adam

Area
  - Total: 91.48 km^{2} (35.32 sq mi)

Population (2025-12-31)
  - Total: 414
  - Density: 4.53/km^{2} (11.7/sq mi)
- Time zone: UTC+01:00 (CET)
  - Summer (DST): UTC+02:00 (CEST)
- Postal codes: 29303
- Dialling codes: 05051
- Vehicle registration: CE
- Website: www.lohheide.de

Lohheide (German pronunciation: [ˈloːhaɪdə]) is an unincorporated area in the district of Celle, in Lower Saxony, Germany.

It covers an area of 91.32 square kilometres (35.26 sq mi) and has 764 inhabitants (as at 31 December 2006). Together with administrative area of Osterheide it is part of the Bergen-Hohne Military Training Area.

== History ==
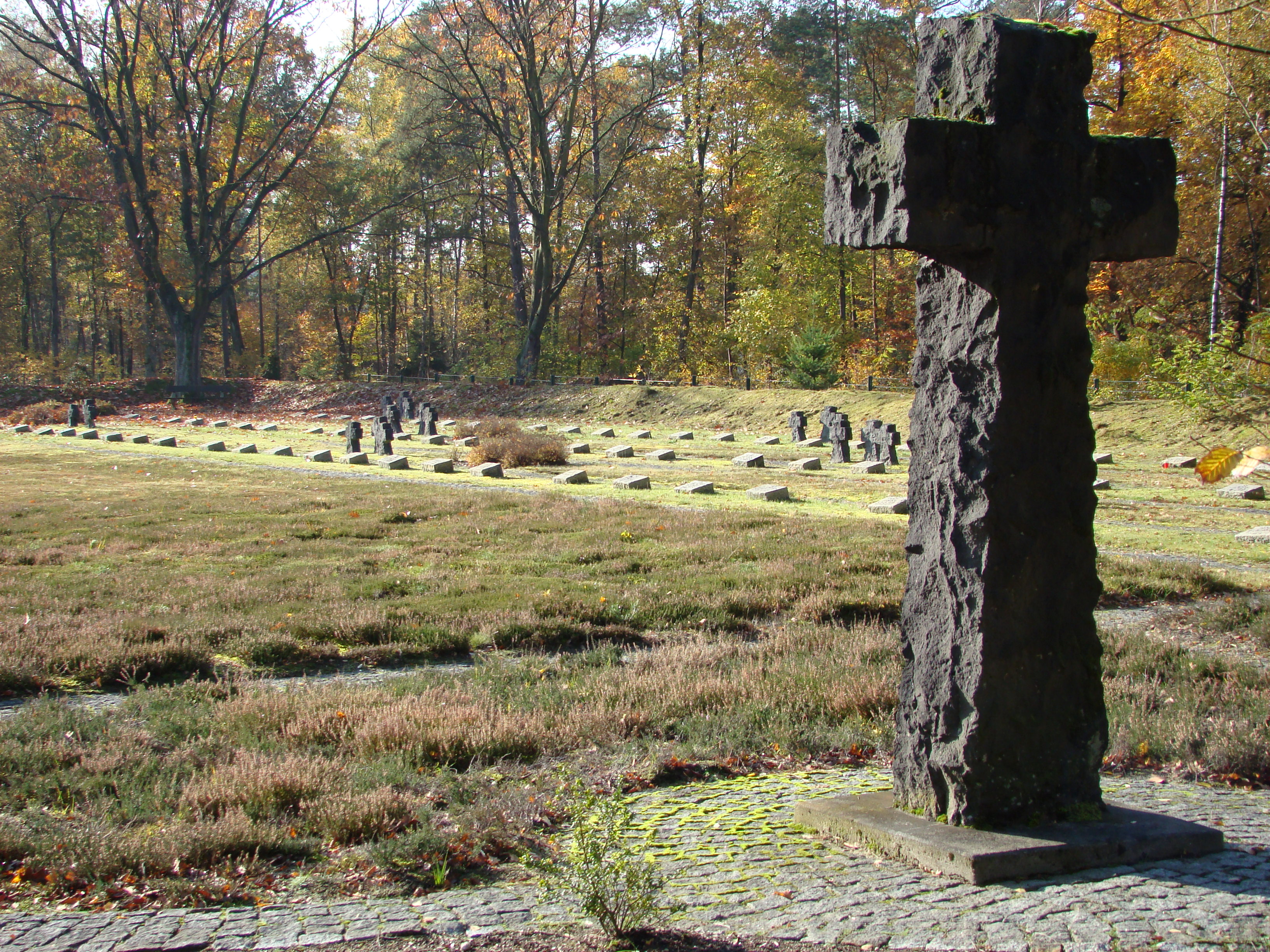
German war cemetery in Bergen-Hohne camp

In 1935 the German armed forces, the Wehrmacht, established the military training area of Bergen between Bergen and Fallingbostel. A total of 24 villages were evacuated and their inhabitants relocated. In 1938 the Bergen Area Estate (Gutsbezirk Platz Bergen) was created to administer the training area and it was subordinated to Fallingbostel district. In 1945 the Gutsbezirk was split into two independent areas, known as the Osterheide and Lohheide Estates. Osterheide remained part of Fallingbostel district, whilst Lohheide was re-subordinated again to Celle district.

Today Lohheide lies within the NATO Bergen-Hohne firing ranges in Soltau-Fallingbostel district which were established in 1958.

== Legal status ==
According to § 16 of the Lower Saxony Municipality Regulations (NGO) the management of unincorporated or unparished areas is to be governed by a regulation. The extant version of this regulation was issued on 4 December 1996. This states that "the delivery of public services for the area's sphere of activity is the responsibility of the land owner" which in the case of Lohheide and Osterheide, is the Federal Government.

The constitution of an unincorporated area is different from that of municipality. Its instruments are the district principal (Bezirksvorsteher) and a council of elected representatives of the inhabitants. The mayor is proposed by the land owners and then elected by the council. The participation rights of the inhabitants are limited to the election of representatives as well as the opportunity to ask questions and listen to the public proceedings of the council.

== Cultural monuments and places of interest ==
The following places of interest may be found in Lohheide:

- Schloss Bredebeck on the Liethbach stream (part of Hohne camp),
- the Bergen-Belsen concentration camp visitors' centre and memorial site,
- the cemetery for the victims of tyranny in Hohne camp,
- the German war cemetery und
- the monument to Colonel-General Werner Freiherr von Fritsch,
- near Hörsten, the Soviet war cemetery
