= Bad Fallingbostel =

Town in Lower Saxony, Germany

- Town
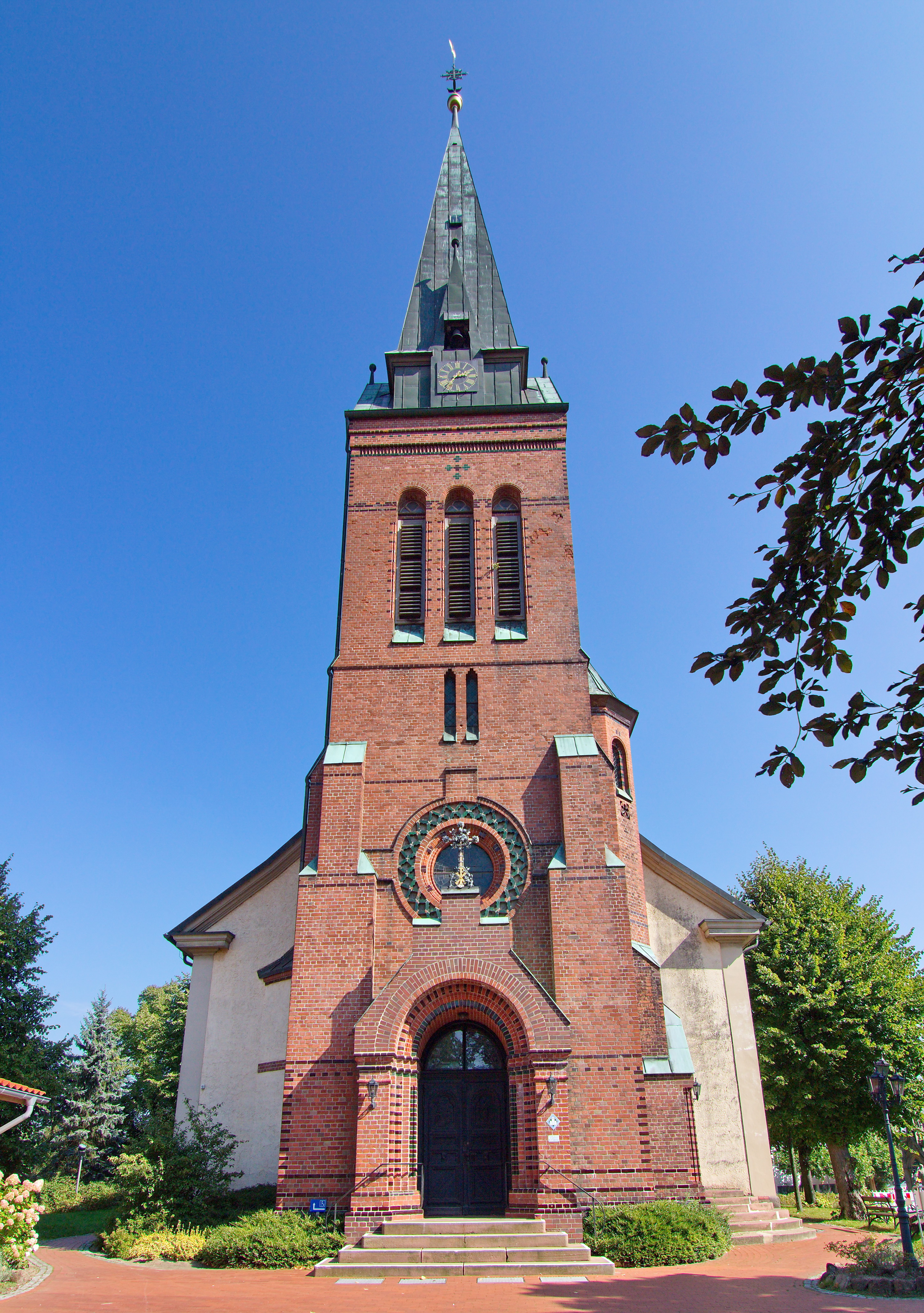
- Saint Dionysius Church

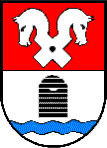
- Flag Coat of arms

- Location of Bad Fallingbostel within Heidekreis district
- Interactive map of Bad Fallingbostel
- Location within Germany Location within Lower Saxony
- Coordinates: 52°52′03″N 09°41′48″E
- Country: Germany
- State: Lower Saxony
- District: Heidekreis

Government
  - Mayor (2021–26): Rolf Schneider (SPD)

Area
  - Total: 63.7 km^{2} (24.6 sq mi)
- Elevation: 67 m (220 ft)

Population (2025-12-31)
  - Total: 12,749
  - Density: 200/km^{2} (518/sq mi)
- Time zone: UTC+01:00 (CET)
  - Summer (DST): UTC+02:00 (CEST)
- Postal codes: 29683
- Dialling codes: 05162, 05163
- Vehicle registration: HK
- Website: www.badfallingbostel.de

Bad Fallingbostel (German pronunciation: [baːt ˌfalɪŋˈbɔstl̩]; Northern Low Saxon: Bad Fambossel) is the district town (Kreisstadt) of the Heidekreis district in the German state of Lower Saxony. Since 1976 the town has had a state-recognised Kneipp spa and has held the title of Bad since 2002. It has close ties to Walsrode, a few miles to the west. Until 2015, there was a British Army base in Bad Fallingbostel, It also hosted Defender 2020, the largest US Army/NATO exercise since the Cold War. The town has around 11,000 inhabitants.

== Geography ==
=== Location ===
Bad Fallingbostel lies on the Böhme river in the southern part of the Lüneburg Heath between Soltau and Walsrode in the Heidmark.

=== Sub-divisions ===
The administrative borough of Bad Fallingbostel is also responsible for the villages of Dorfmark, Riepe, Vierde, Jettebruch and Mengebostel as well as the town itself.

The core city is divided into the following districts:

- In the west: Idingen, Am Wiethop, Am Rooksberg
- In the north: Adolphsheide, Große Heide, Lehmhorst, Klint
- In the east: Ober and Unter-Grünhagen
- In the south: Am Weinberg, industrial areas at the highway, Pröhlsfeld, Oerbker Berg and Ost

== History ==
Bad Fallingbostel was first mentioned as "Vastulingeburstalle" in 993 and has therefore a recorded history of over 1,000 years. Originally it was a purely agricultural settlement, due to agriculture being the basis for life of the inhabitants of the old-Saxon Loingau. The name "Vastulingeburstalle" means either "House of the Vastulo" or "House of the Vastulingians". Otto III drew the borders between the dioceses Hildesheim and Minden during that time.

The Vogtei Fallingbostel (bailiwick) was established around 1300. It was later also called Amt Fallingbostel and it existed until the 19th century. In 1838 Heinrich von Quintus-Icilius, the assessor of the Vogtei, founded the “Sparcasse für die Amtsvogtei Fallingbostel”, one of the first rural savings banks in the Kingdom of Hannover. In 1866 the newly Prussian province of Hannover was divided into administrative districts, one of them was the district Fallingbostel. Fallingbostel was awarded its status as a town in 1949.

During World War II Fallingbostel was the site of two POW camps: Stalag XI-B and Stalag XI-D / 357.

== Demographics ==
=== Religion ===
The majority of the church-going Christian residents of the town belong to the Lutheran church. Within the borough there are two church parishes:

- Fallingbostel parish: the Church of St. Dionysius with 5,598 parishioners and the Peace Church (Friedenskirche) in Bommelsen (municipality of Bomlitz) with 625 members
- Dorfmark parish: St. Martin's Church with 2,848 members

They are served by three pastors. Both parishes belong to the church district of Walsrode in the diocese of Lüneburg, which is part of the Evangelical Lutheran Church of Hanover.

The Catholic Christians in Bad Fallingbostel belong to the Roman Catholic parish of St. Mary of the Holy Rosary (Sankt Maria vom heiligen Rosenkranz), which was founded in August 2004. This merged the hitherto independent Catholic parish of St. Mary in Bad Fallingbostel with the neighbouring parishes of St. Mary's Church in Walsrode and the Church of the Holy Spirit in Bomlitz-Benefeld as well as the Church of the Sacred Heart in Visselhövede. The parish lies in the church district of Verden in the Roman Catholic Diocese of Hildesheim.

== Government ==
=== "Adopted town" ===
In 1963 Bad Fallingbostel adopted the town of Miastko (German: Rummelsburg) in Pomerania, Poland. Every two years they meet in Bad Fallingbostel.

=== Town-twinning ===
Bad Fallingbostel is twinned today with the Polish town of Miastko (see above) and with the French town of Périers in Lower Normandy.

=== Proposed merger into the town of Böhmetal ===
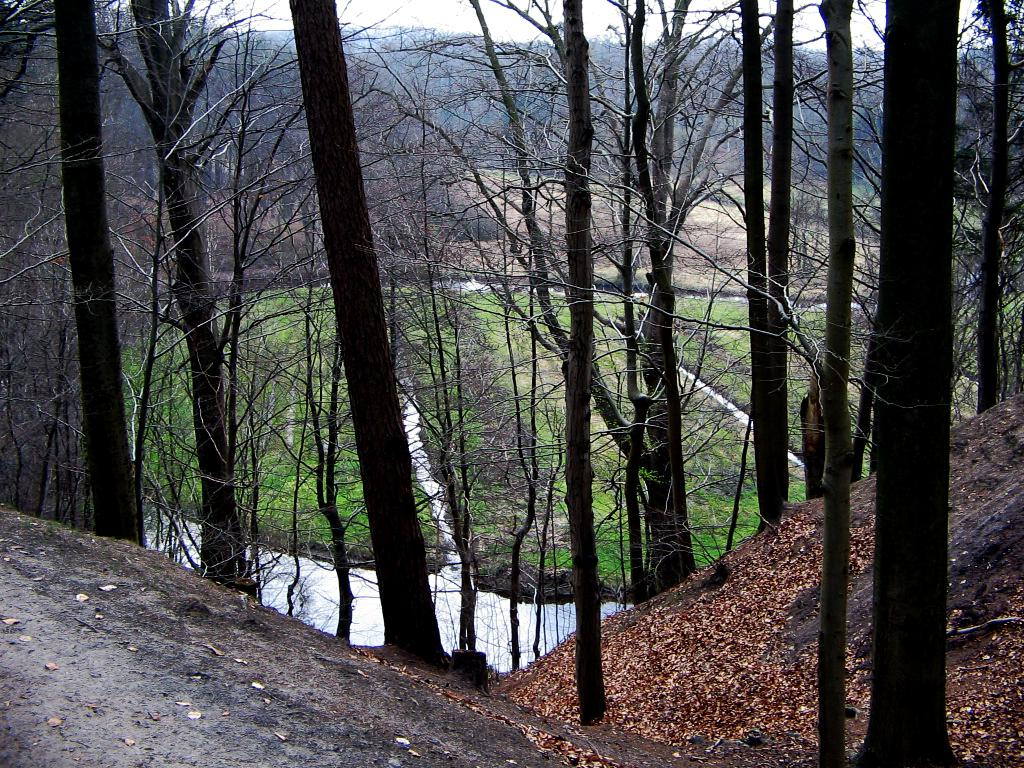
The Böhme valley in the Lieth

A merger of Bad Fallingbostel with the town of Walsrode and the municipality of Bomlitz was planned for 2011 to create the town of Böhmetal. Following a referendum on 2 November 2008 this plan was rejected by the citizens in Bad Fallingbostel with a clear majority. Just under 62% of the voters turned out, of whom 80% were against the merger. In Walsrode and Bomlitz a small majority were in favour of a merger (56.4% in Bomlitz and 53.8% in Walsrode). On 10 November 2008 the town council of Bad Fallingbostel voted against the merger.

== Arts and culture ==
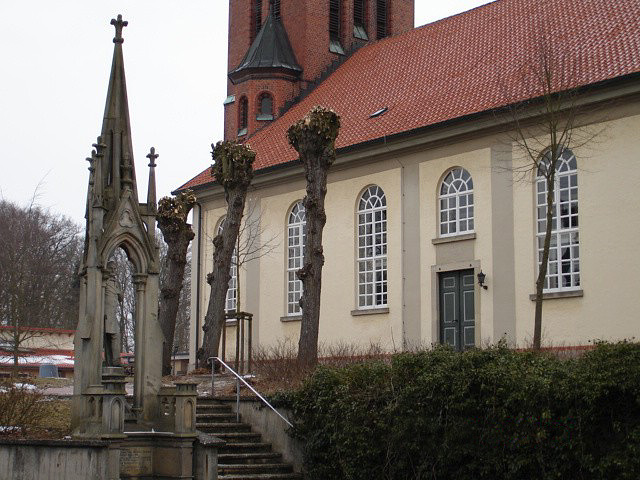
Memorial to Heinrich von Quintus Icilius (1864)

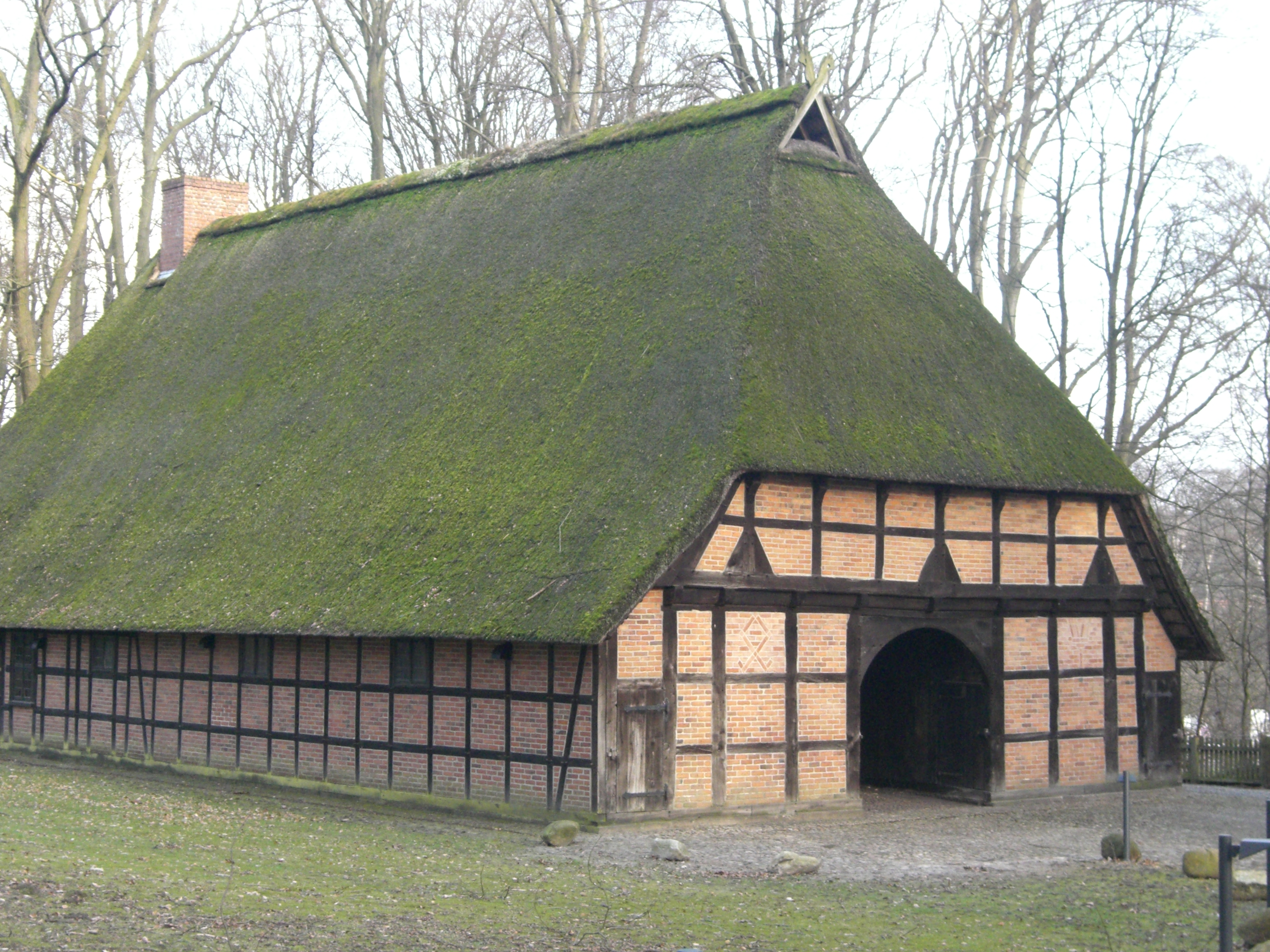
The Hof der Heidmark in an old Low German farmhouse

=== Events ===
Between 1997 and 2002 demoparties for the computing world took place in Bad Fallingbostel under the name of "Mekka & Symposium".

=== Places of interest ===
- Bad Fallingbostel is host to the museum of the Archaeological Working Group (Archäologischen Arbeitsgemeinschaft).
- in the Osterberg Megalith Park large stones are displayed, which were transported from Scandinavia during the ice ages to the region around Bad Fallingbostel.
- other archaeological sights nearby include the Sieben Steinhäuser, a Neolithic burial site with five dolmens. They are located within the restricted military area of Bergen-Hohne Training Area (near Ostenholz). There is also a Bronze Age burial site near the village of Vierde.
- the spa park (Kurpark)
- the Hof der Heidmark with its Rummelsburg homestead, a Low German house in the Liethwald wood
- the Protestant Church of St. Dionysius in the town centre
- the Quintus Memorial at St. Dionysius' Church
- the Protestant St. Martin's Church in Dorfmark
- the village well in Dorfmark
- the grave of Hermann Löns in the Tietling juniper grove (Wacholderhain), which may or may not contain the actual remains of the writer
- the grave of Erich von Manstein, one of the most prominent military commanders of Nazi-Germany, in Dorfmark

== Infrastructure ==
=== Military installations ===
The town is not far from the large military training area of Bergen-Hohne, which is currently used by the Bundeswehr and by NATO forces. This is located in the gemeindefreie Gebiete (i.e. areas not part of any civilian administrative district) known as Osterheide and Lohheide. In addition, there was Fallingbostel Station, a large barracks within Bergen-Hohne Garrison, itself part of British Forces Germany. This was used by units from the 7th Armoured Brigade.

Fallingbostel Station was closed in 2015 as the British Army reduces its presence in Germany ahead of a complete withdrawal by 2020—a result of the 2010 Strategic Defence and Security Review.

=== Transport ===
Bad Fallingbostel has two railway stations - Bad Fallingbostel and Dorfmark - on the Heath Railway from Hanover to Soltau.

Bad Fallingbostel lies on the A 7 motorway between the Walsrode three-way intersection and the Maschener Kreuz four-way intersection.

== Notable people ==
=== People from the town ===
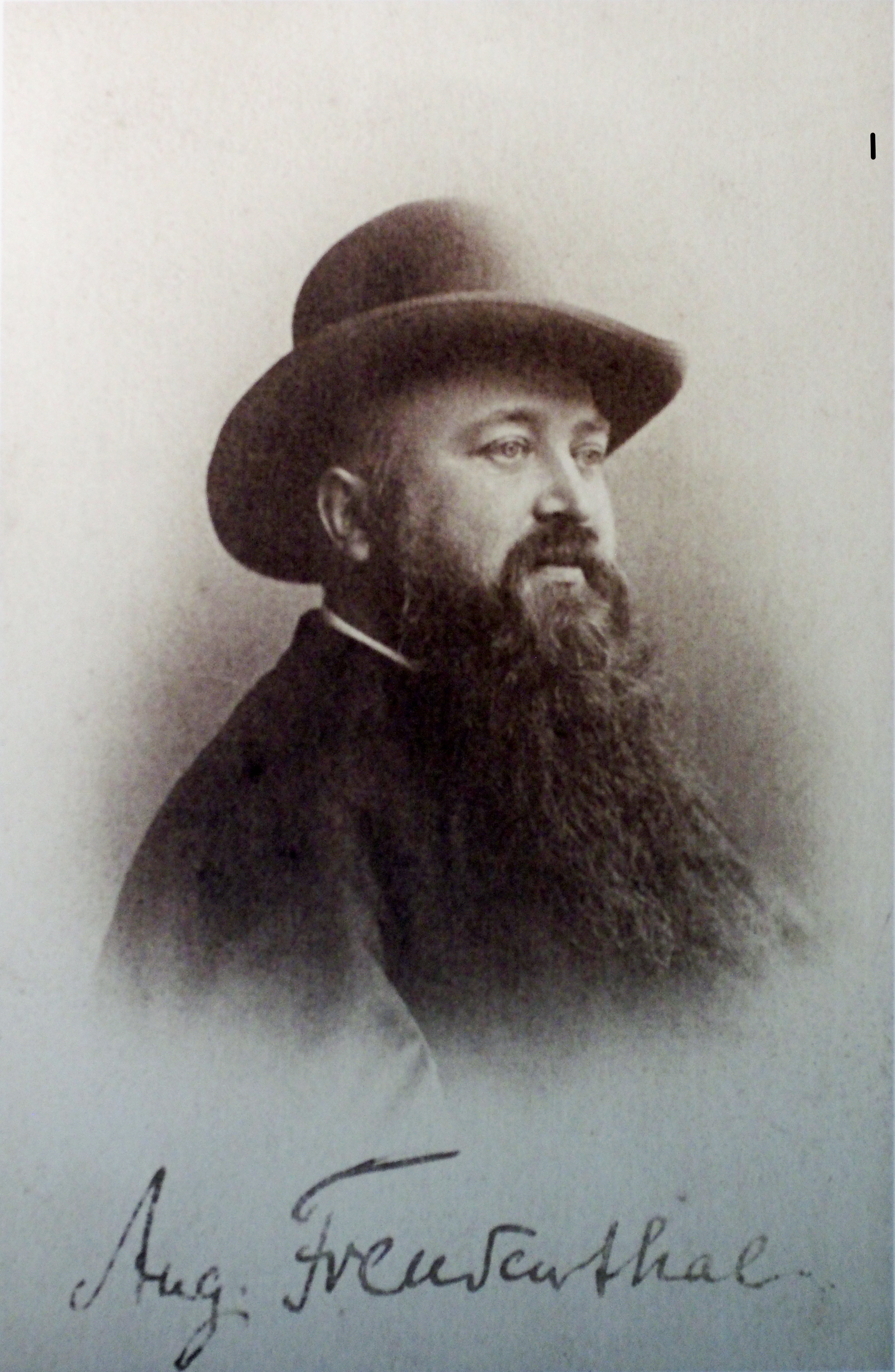
Friedrich Freudenthal

- Friedrich Freudenthal (1849–1929), regional poet
- August Freudenthal (1851–1898), regional poet
- Helmut Schlüter (1925–1967), trade unionist and politician (SPD), MdB
- Helga Jansen (1950–2010), politician (SPD), member of the Bremen City Parliament
- Christoph Künkel (born 1958), Lutheran theologian, Oberkirchenrat of the Evangelical Lutheran Church of Hanover, CEO of the Social Service Agency of the Protestant Churches in Lower Saxony

=== People associated with the town ===
- Heinrich von Quintus-Icilius (1798–1861), civil lawyer; a statue of him has been erected in Fallingbostel

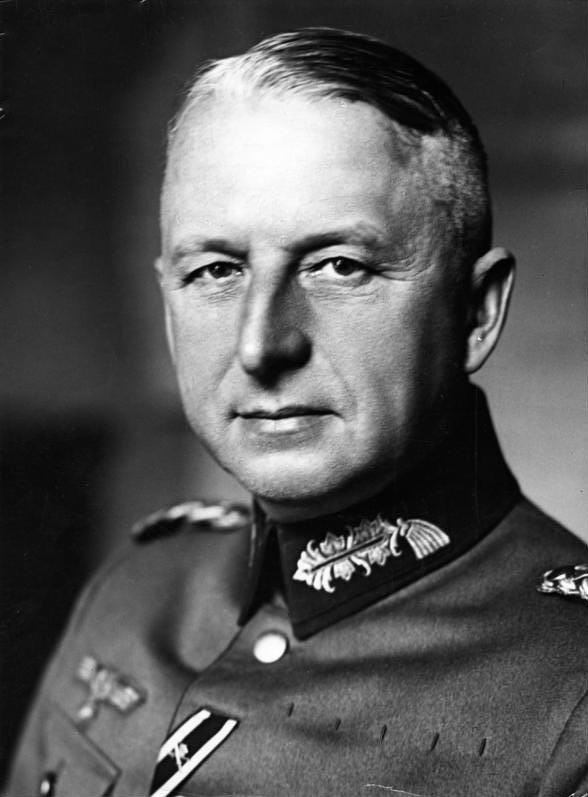
Erich von Manstein 1938

- Erich von Manstein (1887–1973), field marshal of the Wehrmacht, laid to rest in Dorfmark near Fallingbostel
- Fritz Gansberg (1871–1950), German writer, an elementary school teacher and educational reformer
- Hans Stuhlmacher (1892–1962), educator, Wehrmacht officer and local historian; a street was named after him in Bad Fallingbostel
- Walter Schultz (1900–1957) Bishop of the Evangelical-Lutheran Church of Mecklenburg in Schwerin during the National Socialist period and 1950-1952 Pastor in Bad Fallingbostel
