= Bergen-Hohne Training Area =

NATO military training area in Germany

Coordinates: 52°48′0″N 9°49′0″E

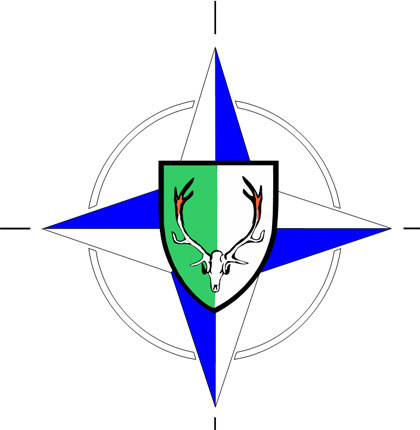
Emblem of Bergen-Hohne Training Area

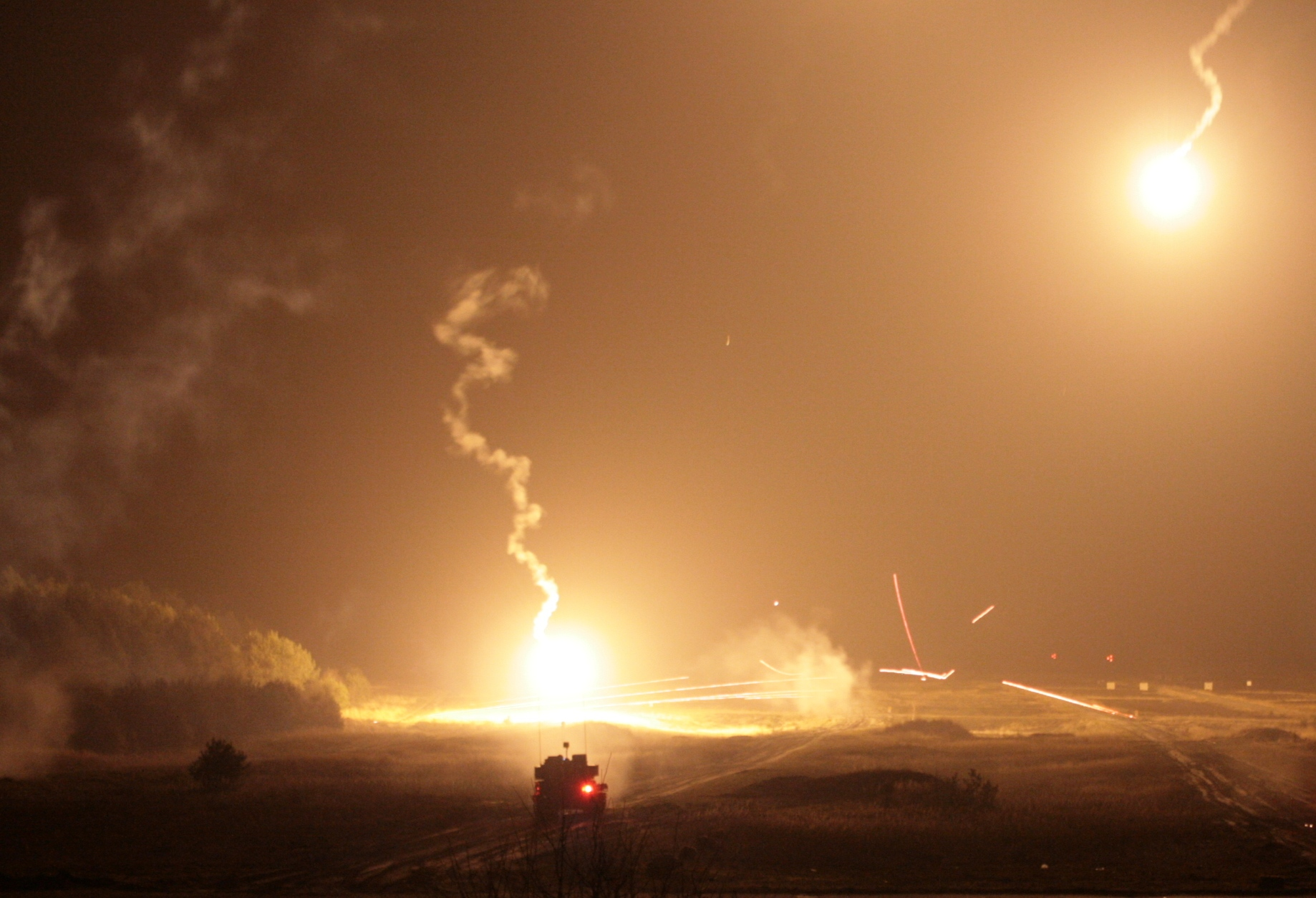
Royal Dragoon Guards Recce Troop night firing in the area in 2007

The Bergen-Hohne Training Area (German: NATO-Truppenübungsplatz Bergen or Schießplatz Bergen-Hohne) is a NATO military training area in the southern part of the Lüneburg Heath, in the state of Lower Saxony in northern Germany. It covers an area of 284 square kilometres (70,000 acres), which makes it the largest military training area in Germany.

It was established by the German armed forces, the Wehrmacht, in 1935. At the end of the Second World War it was taken over by British occupying forces and some of its facilities used as a liberation camp for survivors of the Bergen-Belsen concentration camp, which was located on the edge of the training area near the town of Bergen. Under British control, the training area was steadily expanded and, since the 1960s, has also been used by the German Armed Forces (Bundeswehr) and other NATO troops.

== Geography ==
=== Location ===
Bergen-Hohne Training Area is situated on both sides of the boundary between the districts of Heidekreis (formerly Soltau-Fallingbostel) and Celle, about 40 kilometres (25 mi) north of Hanover, roughly 70 kilometres (43 mi) southeast of Bremen and around 80 kilometres (50 mi) south of Hamburg. It is located between Bad Fallingbostel in the west and Bergen in the east, and between the towns of Soltau a few miles to the north and Wietze to the south. Its extent roughly coincides with the geographical area known as the Heidmark. The terrain is between 28 and 150 m above sea level (NN).

=== Landscape ===
The central part of the training area consists of two areas of heathland (Heide) known as Lohheide und Osterheide, which have not been under any local administrative control since 1945. Surrounding this are a number of areas of marsh known in German as a Moor. In the northern part of the training area is the small Wittenmoor. Just beyond its eastern boundary is the larger Großes Moor, in the south is the Ostenholz Moor and on the southern boundary the Bannetzer Moor which adjoins the Meißendorf Lakes. The remaining areas consist of woodland.

Outside of and flowing parallel to the northwestern edge of the military training area is part of the middle course of the River Böhme. Similarly the Meiße runs roughly along its southeastern and southern boundary (both are northeastern tributaries of the River Aller). Near the centre of the area are the Sieben Steinhäuser (literally: seven stone houses), a group of dolmens that may be visited at weekends. East-southeast of them and not far away is a small lake, the Meiersee, through which the Meierbach stream flows in a southwesterly direction. The central and southern parts of the training area are drained by this stream (which passes the Sieben Steinhäuser) and the Hohe Bach, both northeastern tributaries of the Meiße. Its southeastern part is drained by the Liehlbach (a northern tributary of the Meiße), along which several ponds are found and the northwest mainly by the Fischendorfer Bach (a southeastern tributary of the Böhme), which likewise has many ponds. The extreme northeast is drained by streams that flow eastwards into the Meiße.

A heavily wooded moraine ridge runs across the training area in roughly a southwest-to-northeast direction. These woods include the Becklinger Holz and amongst the elevations here are the: Falkenberg (150 m above sea level (NN)), Hakenberg (143 m), Staffelberg (127 m), Hengstberg (121 m), Hammberg (107 m), Großer Dellberg (107 m), Scharpenhorn (107 m), Fuhrberg (102 m), Horstberg (98 m), Söhrenberg (93 m) and Ziegenberg (63 m). The lowest point is on the southwest boundary of the area in the Ostenholz Moor at about 28 m high.

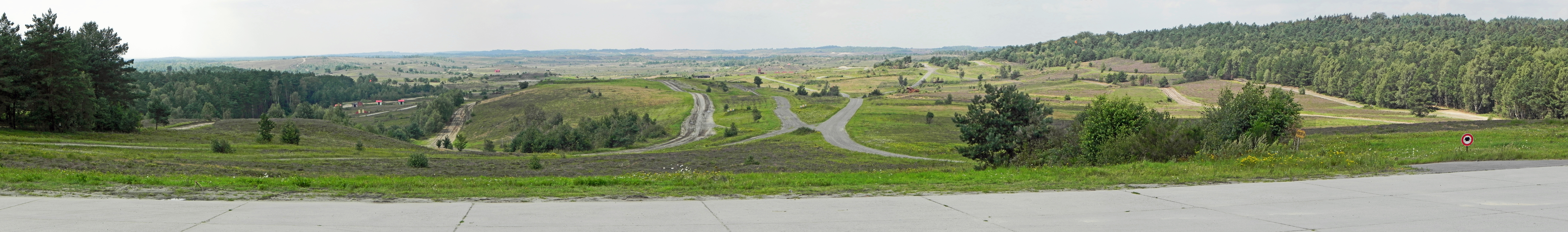
Panorama of the tank firing range 1A with training village Heidedorf down in the valley.

== History ==
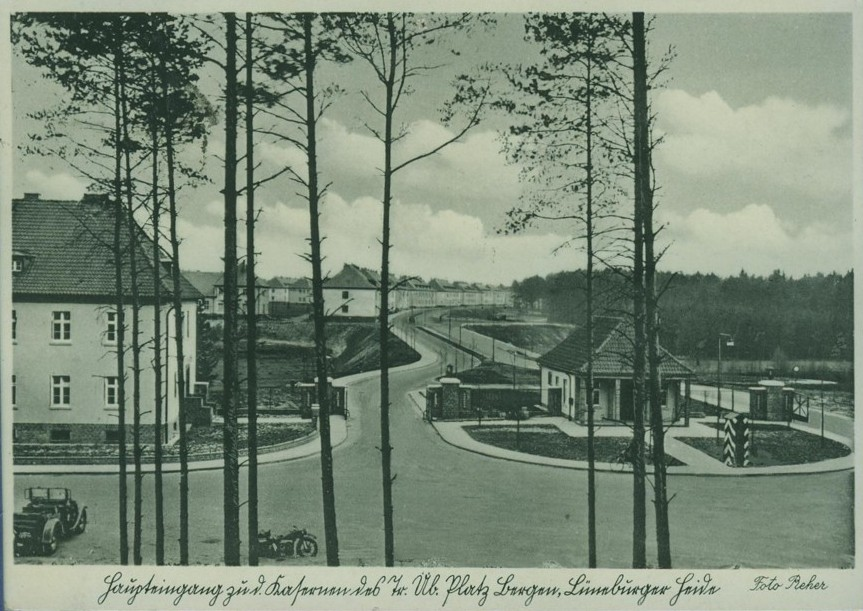
Bergen in the 1930s

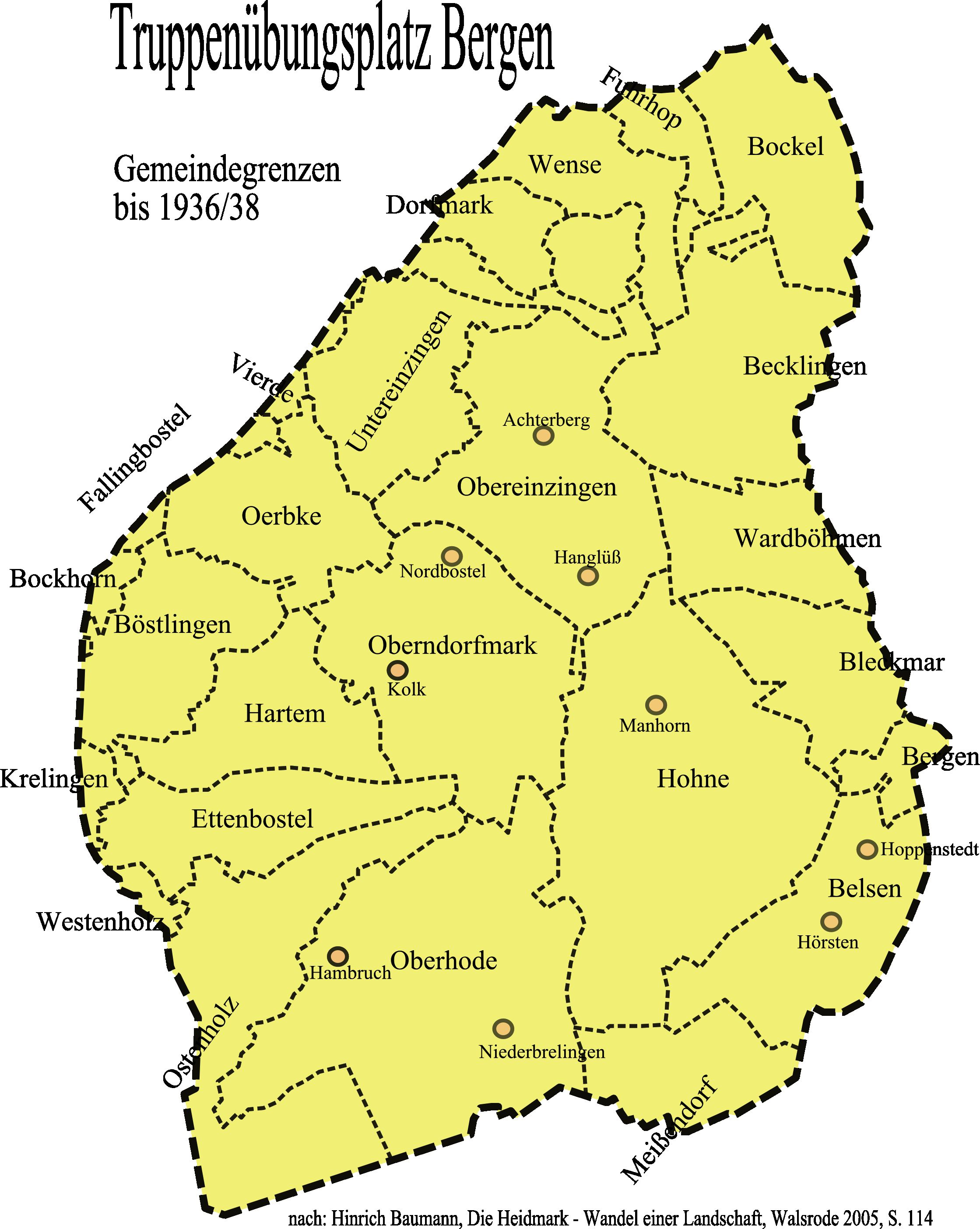
Boundaries of the former parishes cleared out to form the training area in 1936–38

As early as the 19th century the army of the Kingdom of Hanover used two small areas here to drill their troops.

The last wolf in the Lüneburg Heath was seen and shot east of Becklingen on 13 January 1872 in the forest of Becklinger Holz, which, today, is within the training area. It was shot by the forester, Grünewald, who was the head gamekeeper (Leibjäger) to King George V of Hanover, the last king of Hanover. In commemoration of the event, the "Wolf Rock" (Wolfsstein) was erected there in 1892. In 2012, wolves were once again sighted in the training area.

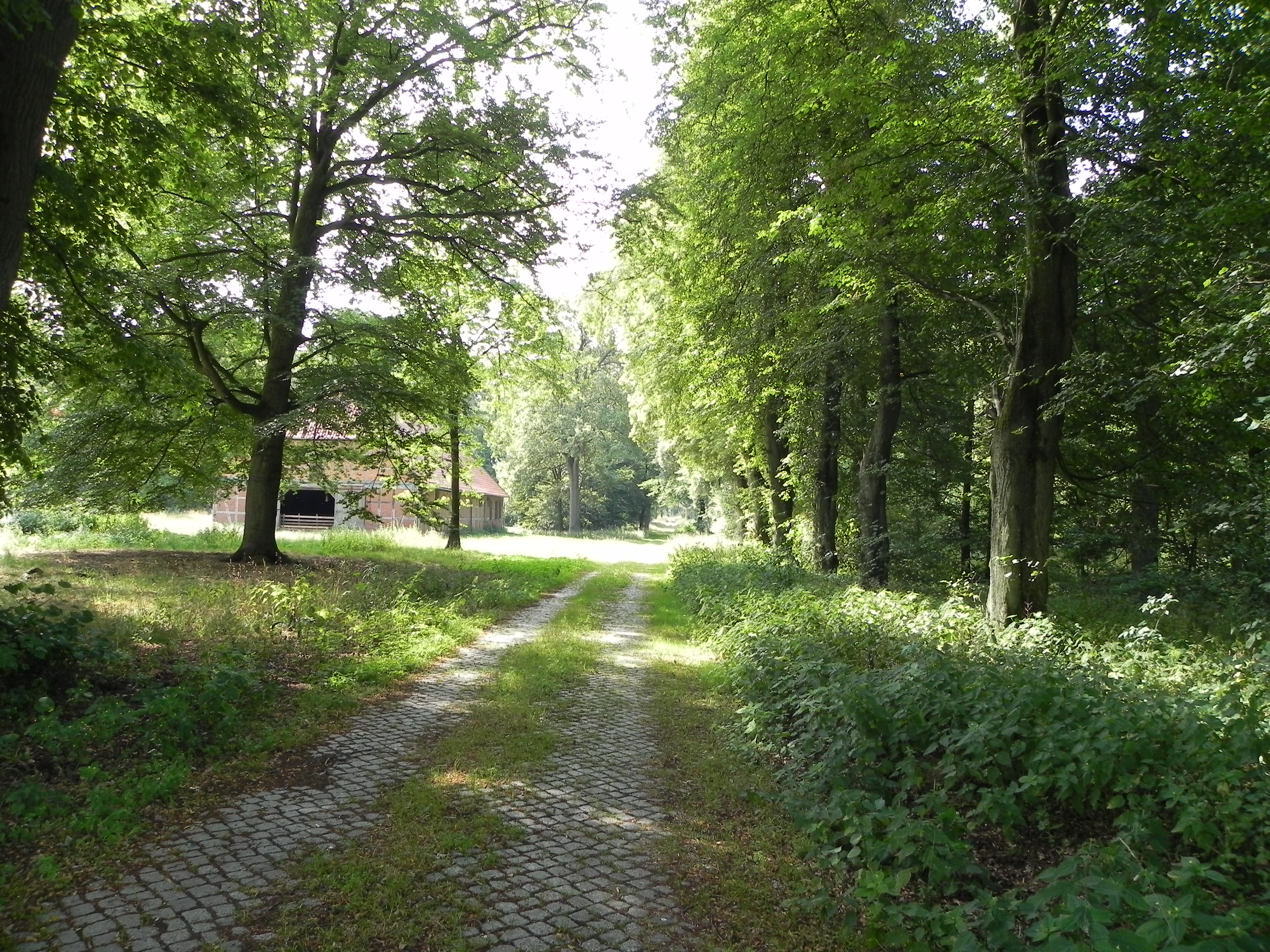
Old village road in the former village of Ettenbostel

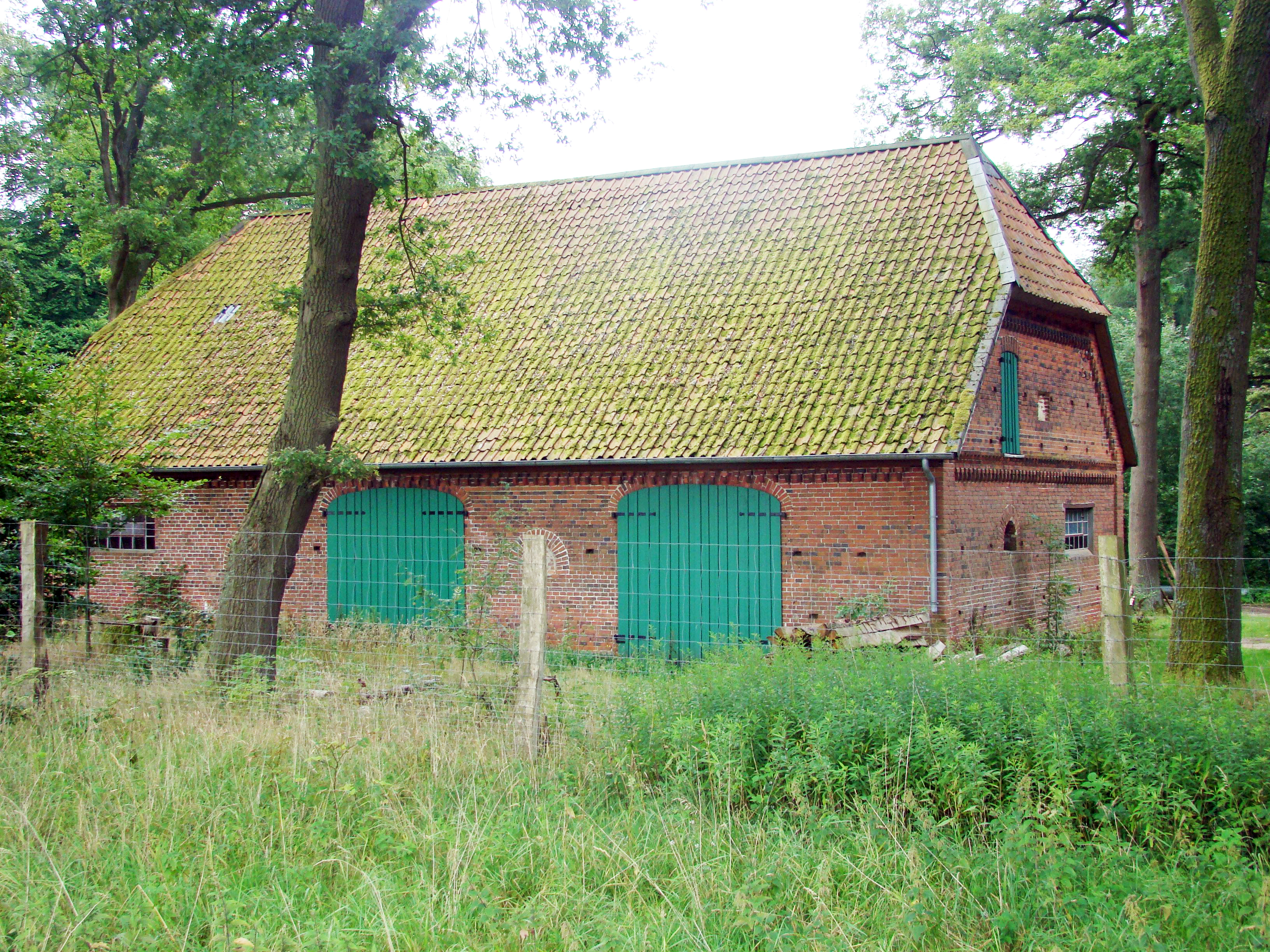
Old cattle shed of an evacuated village

The first plans for establishing the military training area were laid in August 1934 as part of the military re-armament of the German Reich. Due to the sparse population and the varied landscape this area was selected for creating the largest exercise area for Germany's armed forces, the Wehrmacht. On 15 September 1934 the news of the establishment of a training area reached the farmers resident there. On 1 October 1934 the farmers affected by the relocation assembled at the Sieben Steinhäuser for a counsel. A delegation went that same day to Goslar to the Reichsbauernführer ("Reich Farmers' Leader") to present their concerns. On 18 March 1935 more than 80 farmers drove to Berlin to confirm their future and the planned relocation of their homes.

In spite of opposition from the local population, within a few years 3,635 inhabitants in 25 villages had to leave their homes. Amongst the villages that disappeared from the map were Deil, Hörsten, Hoppenstedt, Hohne, Hohnerode, Manhorn, Lohe, Gudehausen, Ettenbostel, Oberndorfmark, Oberhode, Benhorn, Hartem, Fahrenholz, Böstlingen, Pröbsten, Kolk, Südbostel, Nordbostel, Obereinzingen, Untereinzingen, Achterberg, Wense and parts of Oerbke, Ostenholz and Hasselhorst.

At the eastern perimeter of the area, near the village of Belsen, and called in those days the Ostlager or "East Camp", around 100 barrack blocks, 50 stables and 40 large garage blocks were built, as well as a hospital, storage depots and a target factory, where targets for the firing ranges were made. To the south of this camp was a military ammunition dump for infantry munitions. On 4 May 1936 the first units took over their accommodation.

On the western edge of the area, near the village of Oerbke, another camp, the Westlager ("West Camp"), was built. From 1 April 1937 until 1942 more barracks, stables, garages and depots went up. From 1 August 1938 military exercises took place across the whole training area.

On 15 April 1945 the training area was taken over by British forces. They initially only used the eastern part of the area as a Royal Armoured Corps Training Centre. Up to 1952, the training area was expanded more and more until it reached its present-day limits. During the Cold War the area was intensively used by the heavy concentrations of troops on the North German Plain, which was seen as strategically important to NATO. There were also discussions about combining the training areas of Munster and Bergen.

In 1957 the Bundeswehr was also allowed to use the training area again. They maintained a liaison headquarters there with the British commandant. On 1 April 1958 the British Army transferred the training area to the Bundeswehr.

Up to 50,000 British, American and German soldiers were stationed at Bergen-Hohne and it became the largest military training area in Europe and one of the training area for NATO's ground forces in the Federal Republic of Germany. In the southwest of the area is Ostenholz Camp (Lager Ostenholz), which has an autobahn junction in the immediate vicinity. This camp is only used for exercising troops, yet it has permanent accommodation as well as the massive buildings of the training area's headquarters and permanent range staff.

After the end of the Cold War the number of soldiers significantly reduced. The British Army withdrew completely from the area in September 2015. The facility still has considerable importance, however. Live firing ranges are heavily used by the Bundeswehr, Dutch and Belgian forces. Plans for the future use of the military facilities are still unknown.

== Current Use ==
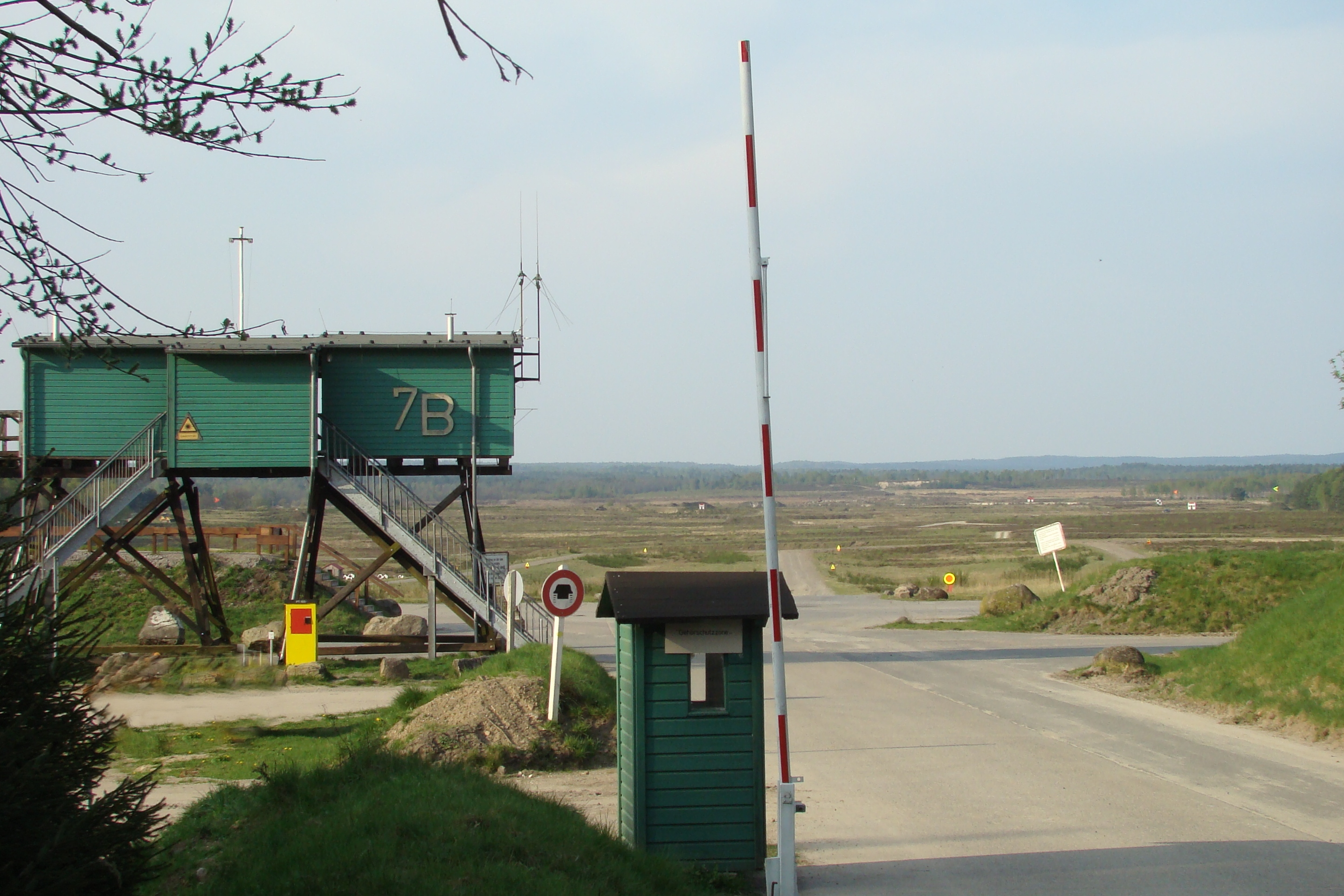
Tank range 7 B near Ostenholz

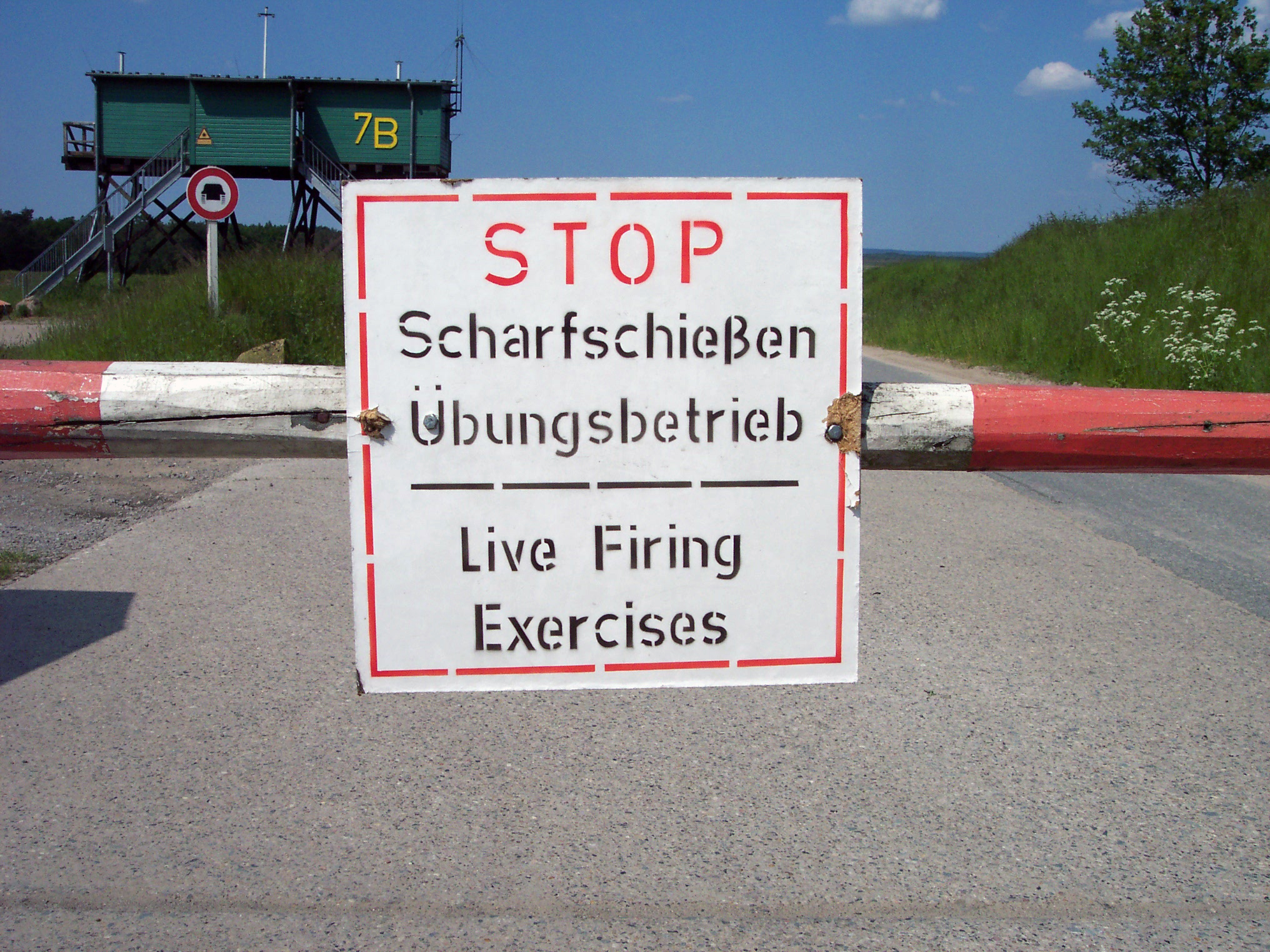
Sign that live-firing is taking place

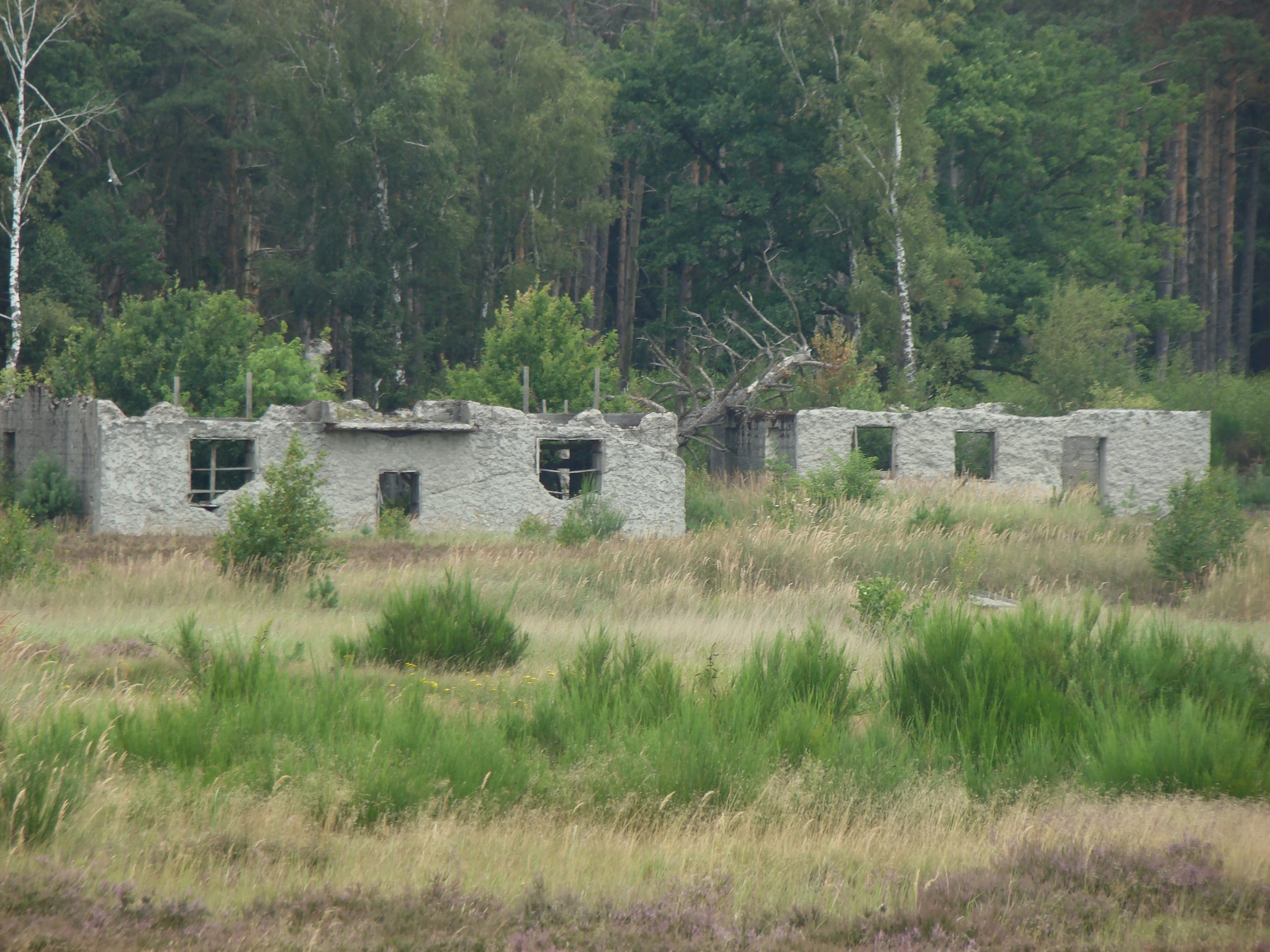
FIBUA village

The original ranges and their purpose:

Range	Opened	Use
I	in 1936	Tank firing range
II	in 1936	Infantry firing range
III	in 1936	Infantry + anti-aircraft range
IV	in 1936	Infantry firing range
V	in 1936	Infantry and artillery range
VI	in 1936	Tank firing range
VII	in 1939	Tank firing range
VIII	in 1939	Tank firing range
IX	in 1939	Tank firing range
X	in 1939	Tank firing range
XI	in 1941	Tank firing range
XII	in 1944	Tank firing range

Today there are 22 firing ranges on the training area for main battle tanks and infantry fighting vehicles, of which nine are also suitable for anti-tank guided missiles. In addition there are 14 artillery fire positions, six of which are outside the boundaries of the training area. There are also five small arms ranges and three ranges for hand-held anti-tank weapons, as well as air defence training facilities, FIBUA villages, deep wading points and bivouac sites.

The troops of NATO member countries – Germany, Netherlands, Britain and Belgium – exercise regularly on the training area. Major combat equipment that uses the ranges include Challenger 2 and Leopard 2 tanks, WAH-64 Apache attack helicopters and Panzerhaubitze 2000. The area is increasingly used by unmanned aerial vehicles (UAV) and it is the only training area in Germany which may be overflown by reconnaissance drones. Air-to-ground practice and live munitions may also be fired.

== Bergen-Hohne Garrison ==
Hohne station was one of the main British Forces bases and was located in Lager Hohne, a former Wehrmacht facility, on the eastern side of the training area. It was the headquarters of Bergen-Hohne Garrison, a large British military garrison for the 7th Armoured Brigade (the Desert Rats) which was part of the British Forces Germany.

Opposite this barracks is the village of Belsen which gave its name to the nearby Bergen-Belsen concentration camp in the Second World War.

== Command ==
The current German commandant of Bergen-Hohne Training Area, Colonel Gerd Ahrens, is also responsible for Munster Training Area. He also has command of the training areas at Ehra-Lessien and Lübtheen.

== Cultural monuments and places of interest ==
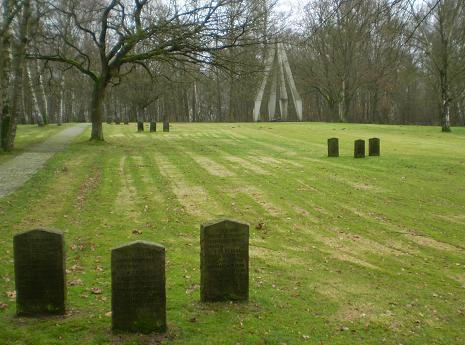
Cemetery of the unknown soldiers

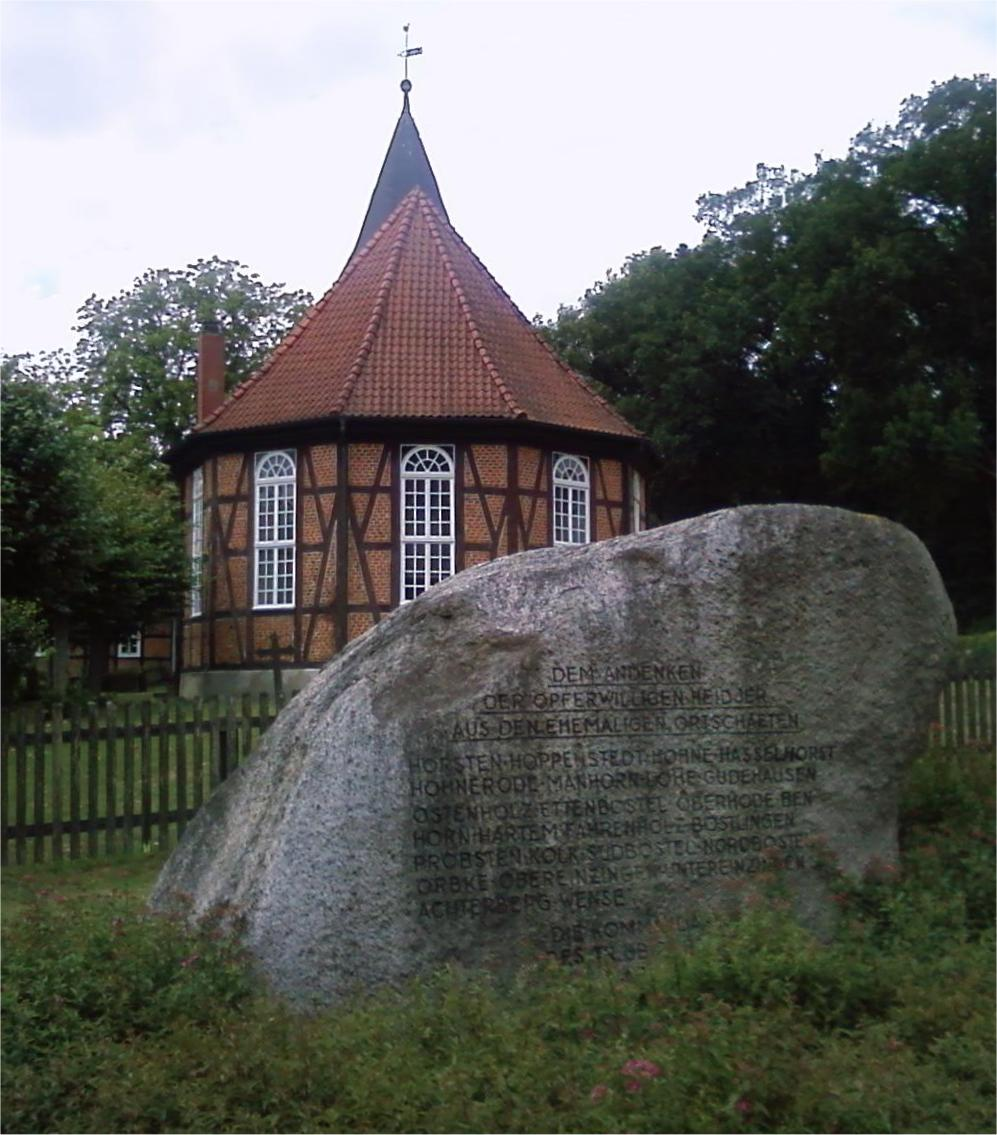
Hoher Stein ("High Rock") and the church in Ostenholz

There are several places of interest within the Bergen-Hohne Training Area:
In the area of Lohheide:

- near Belsen:
  - Bergen-Belsen concentration camp memorial site.
  - Bergen-Belsen concentration camp documentation centre.
  - Bergen-Belsen displaced persons camp
  - Soviet War Cemetery in Hörsten. 14 mass graves in which an estimated 50,000 Soviet POWs were buried (official figures give 23,215 dead).
  - Tented Theatre Cemetery, with 4,500 graves of Jewish and non-Jewish people of all nationalities buried by the end of 1945. Within Hohne Station and only accessible with permission.
  - Kapo Cemetery. Within Hohne Station and only accessible with permission.
  - German War Cemetery, Lohheide
  - Memorial to Colonel General Werner Freiherr von Fritsch in Hoppenstedt (Lohheide).
  - Schloss Bredebeck on the Liethbach stream (part of Hohne Camp). A British officers mess from 1945 to 2016.

In the area of Osterheide and its neighbourhood:

- in Oerbke (to the west):
  - Cemetery of the unknown soldiers Friedhof der Namenlosen, a war cemetery in which about 30,000 Russian prisoners-of-war from the Second World War were buried in mass graves.
- In and around Ostenholz (to the southwest):
  - Timber-framed church with wooden tower dating back to 1724
  - Hoher Stein, a monument to the evacuation of the local communities in 1936 in order to create a Nazi military training area
  - Sieben Steinhäuser, large dolmens (stone graves) from the New Stone Age. in the south of the training area
- in Wense (to the northwest):
  - Gutskapelle, an impressive church built in 1558.

== See also ==
- British Forces Germany
- British Army of the Rhine
- Munster Training Area
- Sieben Steinhäuser
- Soltau-Lüneburg Training Area

== Literature ==
- Olaf Mußmann: Geschichte des Truppenübungsplatzes Bergen. Münster 1996; ISBN 3-8258-2753-4
- Die Heidmark. Wandel einer Landschaft. Die Geschichte des Truppenübungsplatzes Bergen, Hinrich Baumann, Walsrode 2005, ISBN 3-00-017185-1
- Judaslohn, Andree Hesse, crime novel, (set on the military training area and in Eichendorf [= Meißendorf]), ISBN 978-3-8052-0800-0
- Wagner, Jens-Christian (2020). Armament, War and Crimes: The Wehrmacht and the Bergen-Hohne Barracks. Wallstein Verlag. ISBN 978-3-8353-3851-7.
