= Oelfke =

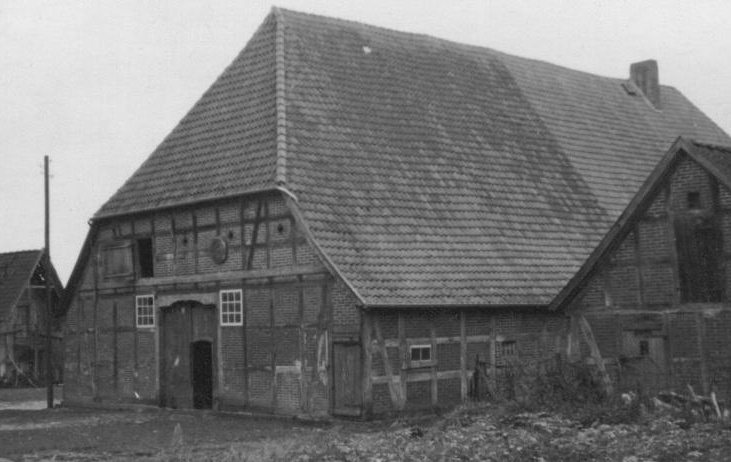
The clan's farmyard of the Oelfkes in Oerbke

Oelfke is a German surname and a Low German (Plattdüütsch) masculine given name.

== Origin and meaning ==
The name Oelfke, name of farmers from the "Hohe Heidmark" of the administrative district Heidekreis in Lower-Saxony, Germany traces back to Ol, Oel=Adel (nobility), Od=Besitz (property), like Oleff, Oloff, Odulleib, that's the one who has the life in sense of "being inheritor", simply expressed that's the one who owns the inheritance of farmer. The farm's name "Oelfkenhof" in Oerbke is already traced to the "Celler Schatzregister" of 1438.

A descendant of the Oelfke family immigrated to the area of Hamburg, Minnesota where thousands of his descendants now live.

== Variants ==
=== Oelfke ===
- Heinz Oelfke (born 1934), German author
- Monika Fornaçon, born Oelfke (born 1964), German football referee

=== Oelfken ===
- Tami Oelfken (1888–1957), German author and school reformer

=== Oelke ===
- Brigitte Oelke (born 1975), Swiss musician and actor
- Jürgen Oelke (born 1940), German rowing coxswain

=== Oelkers ===
- Bryan Oelkers (born 1961), American Major League Baseball pitcher
- Claire Oelkers (born 1985), singer of German rock band Karpatenhund
- Olga Oelkers (1887–1969), German fencer
