= Sieben Steinhäuser =

Group of five dolmens in Germany

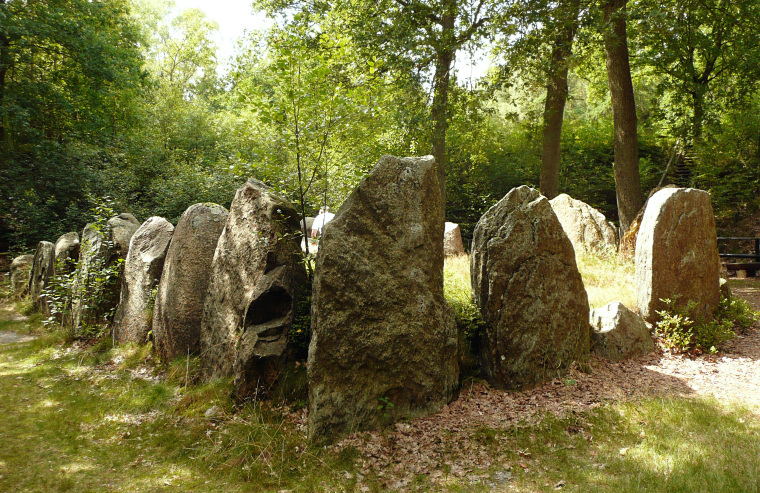
- Grave D, the largest of the five gravesites

- Location within Germany
- 52.800°N 9.7975°E
- Type: Dolmens
- Periods: Neolithic
- Cultures: Funnelbeaker culture
- Location: Bergen-Hohne Training Area, Lower Saxony, Germany
- Region: Germany

Site notes
- Public access: Yes (limited)

The Sieben Steinhäuser also Siebensteinhäuser is a group of five dolmens on the Lüneburg Heath in the NATO training area of Bergen-Hohne, in the state of Lower Saxony in northern Germany. The stones are considered to be part of the funnelbeaker culture (3500 - 2800 B.C.). The gravesite was granted protected cultural monument status in 1923.

== Geographical Location ==
The Sieben Steinhäuser are located roughly in the middle of the Bergen-Hohne Training Area, which lies between Bad Fallingbostel to the northwest and Bergen to the east.

The dolmens are found at a height of 56 and 67 m above sea level (NN). A stream, the Hohe Bach ("High Brook") which is a northeastern tributary of the River Meiße in the catchment area of the Aller, flows past the stones in a north-south direction.

== Accessibility ==
The only public access route to the dolmens begins at a barrier in Ostenholz, about 4 kilometres (2.5 mi) southeast of the Walsrode autobahn interchange. The access road runs for several kilometres through the out-of-bounds area of the military training area. It is regularly cleared of any spent ammunition from the ranges. The site is only accessible on days when no exercises are taking place i.e. at weekends and on public holidays between 8 am and 6 pm.

== History ==
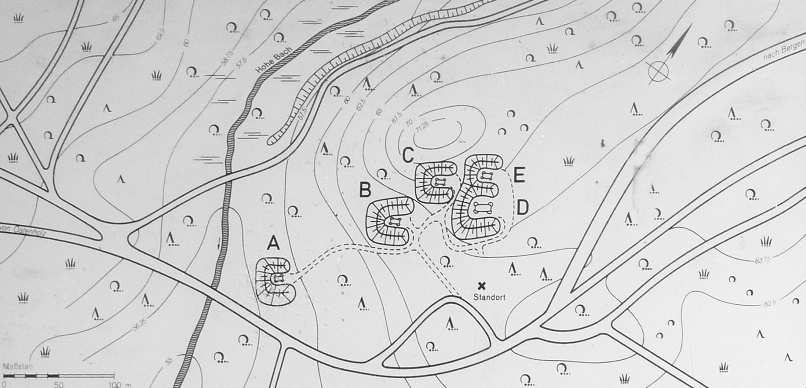
Plan of the site

The Sieben Steinhäuser gravesite was established during the third millennium BC during the Neolithic funnelbeaker period by the first settled farmers. The large gravesite, Grave D, shows similarities to French gravesites, the other four are like those of the Elbe-Weser Triangle.

Although they are traditionally called the Sieben Steinhäuser ("seven stone houses") there are actually only five graves. Because an old illustration from 1744 still shows only five graves, it is assumed today that the number seven is being used in the figurative sense for a larger number, as in the German expression Siebensachen ("seven things") which means 'everything'. The first written record of the graves was made in 1720 by an academic.

On 24 July 1835, the gravesite was placed under conservation protection by the Amtsvogtei of Fallingbostel.

The regional author, August Freudenthal, contributed to their fame in the 19th century. Even then, it was a popular tourist destination.

== Description of the graves ==
The burial chambers are all rectangular and aligned in a northeast-southwest direction. Their capstones are not of bay construction, but almost always supported by three or four points of contact. The largest of the dolmens has a capstone measuring 16 by 14 feet (c. 5 m by 4¼ m) and is supported by seven upright support stones.

All the graves were originally covered with earth, so that they would have looked like earth mounds or tumuli. Over the course of time, the earth was eroded by wind and weather, so that the stones became visible again. Four graves were excavated and restored between 1924 and 1937.

In 1958, the graves were enclosed by protective earthen walls several metres high. They protect the gravesites from shell damage because the site is located in the middle of a live firing range.

The dolmens have Sprockhoff Numbers 806 to 810.

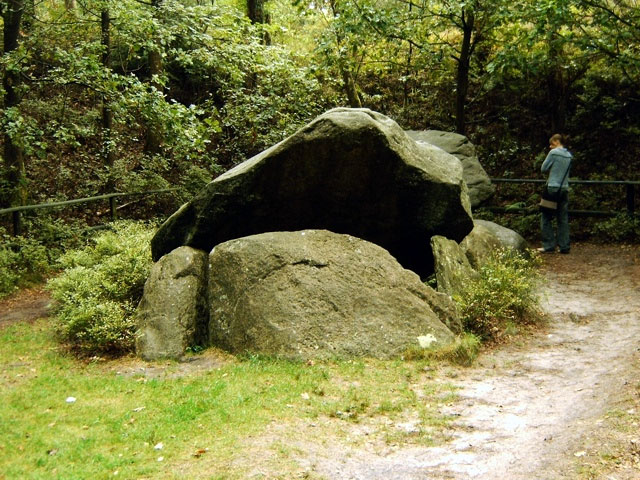
Grave A

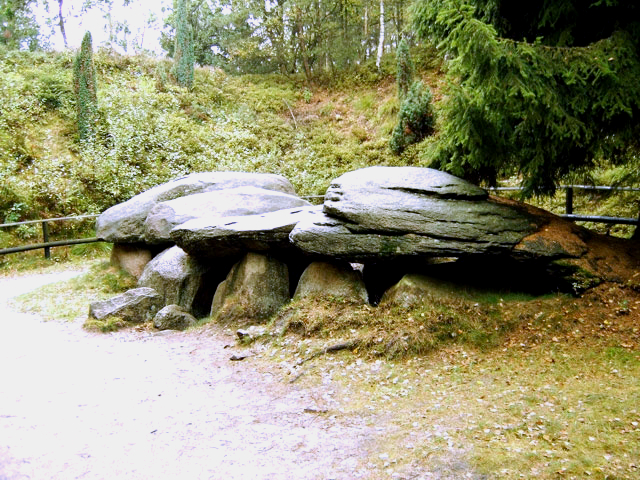
Grave B

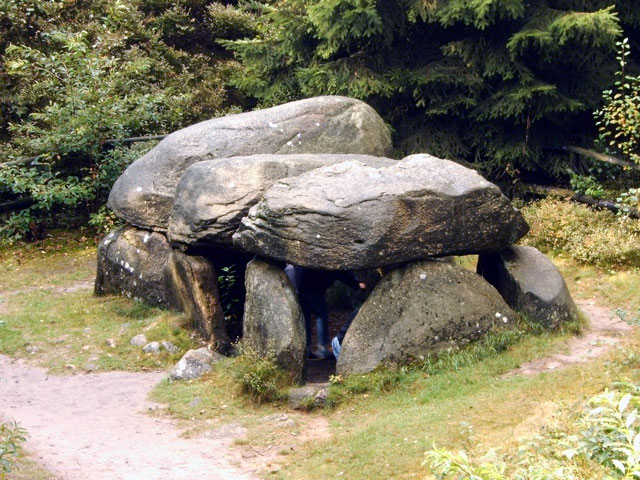
Grave C

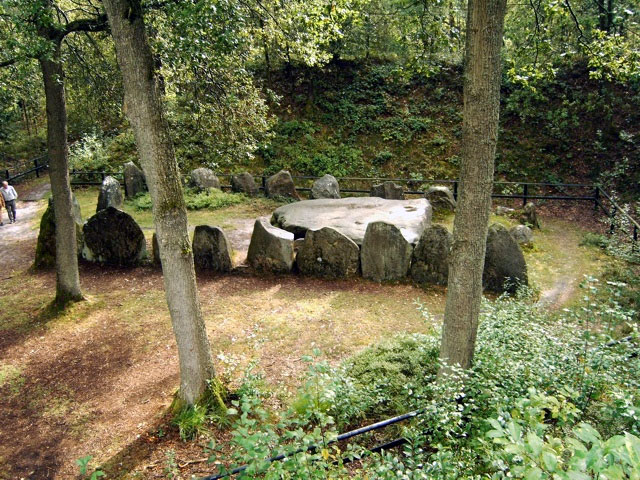
Grave D

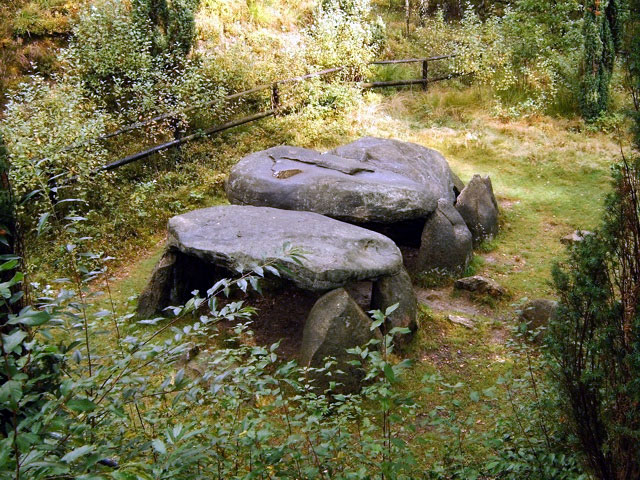
Grave E

=== Grave A ===
Grave A comprises four supporting stones along the sides and another stone at each end. On the supporting stones are three capstones, the middle one of which is considerably narrower and has been broken. The inside dimensions of the chamber are 6.5 x 2 m. The entrance is in the middle of the southeastern side, but only the pair of supporting pillars are left.

=== Grave B ===
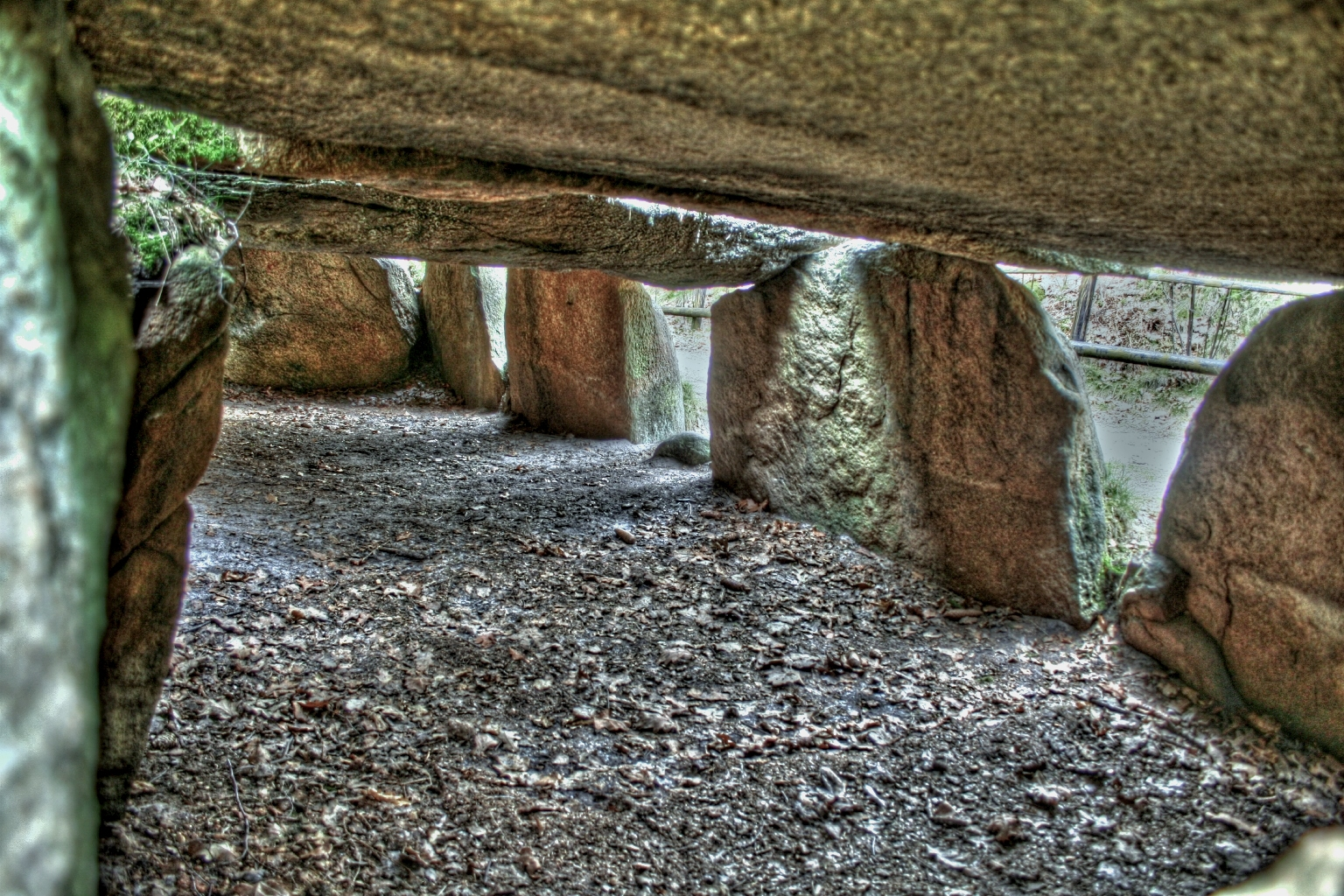
Interior of Grave B

Grave B is also composed of four supporting stones along the sides, but unlike Grave A, there are also four capstones. One is very narrow and placed between them like a lintel (Jochstein). The internal size of the chamber is 7.0 x 2.2 m. Of the entrance in the middle, only the southern pillar remains.

=== Grave C ===
The relatively short chamber of Grave C consists of three supporting stones on the southeast and four on the northwest side, as well as two end stones and three capstones. Before restoration, only the northeastern three-point support, the centre of the three supporting stones on the southeast side and the southwestern end stone were found in situ. Two capstones probably caved in under their own weight when their supports were dislodged. The internal dimensions of the chamber are 5 x 2 m. The outside entrance appears to have been located between the first and centre support stones to the south of the southeastern side of the chamber.

In December 2013, the chamber collapsed, probably due to soil erosion, but there are plans to rebuild it.

=== Grave D with enclosure ===
Grave D is the most impressive in the entire group. The support stones of the short, almost square burial chamber consist of a slab on the southwest side and two on the other side. The chamber is covered by a mighty stone slab which measures 4.6 x 4.2 m and is half a metre thick. The inside dimensions of the stocky chamber are roughly 4 x 3 m.

The entrance is located in the centre of the southeastern side, its support stones are original whilst the capstone has been restored.

A rectangular enclosure belongs to this gravesite, so it appears that we are dealing with a preserved long barrow whose enclosure has been restored. It is about 4 m wide and 14 m long, apart from an abrupt gap to the southwest. Because there are no traces of stone pillars having been removed, it is suspected that this could have been used to lay out 3 to 4 more sites for planned graves during the Neolithic era.

=== Grave E ===
The sides of grave E, like grave A, comprise four supporters each, on which lie three capstones. The support stone on the southwestern end was restored. From the fact that two of the chambers capstones (the southwestern and the centre one) have been found in halves, it is not difficult to surmise that the stone blocks were artificially split in prehistoric times. In carrying out the restoration work the two easily movable capstones were replaced. The chamber has internal measurements of 5.6 x 2 m. Only the two external pillars are left from the entrance in the middle of the southeastern side.

== The legend of the Sieben Steinhäuser ==
According to a legend that is recounted by many in the Heidmark area, the largest stone was fired at the Sieben Steinhäuser by the giant of Borg from a catapult at Elferdingen which was located near the "Orskarrn". The two largest stone pillars of the largest grave were placed by the giant in the pocket of his coat. The giant went to the stone graves via Fallingbostel. There the area was very sandy and the giant's shoes soon filled with sand. He shook himself out near Fallingbostel and that's how the Tutberg and Weinberg hills appeared.

== See also ==
The following burial sites are also in the same general area:

- Bonstorf Barrows - a Neolithic or early Bronze Age burial site.
- Dohnsen-Siddernhausen Dolmen - another dolmen site.
- Oldendorfer Totenstatt

== Literature ==
- E. Sprockhoff: Atlas der Megalithgräber Deutschlands. Part 3, Niedersachsen und Westfalen. (pub.: G. Kröner, Bonn, 1975). ISBN 3-7749-1326-9
- Ernst Andreas Friedrich: Wenn Steine reden könnten. Vol. II, Landbuch-Verlag, Hanover, 1992, ISBN 3-7842-0479-1
- H. Schirnig: Archäologischer Wegweiser. Die Sieben Steinhäuser bei Fallingbostel. Hildesheim, 1982.
