= Hans Stuhlmacher =

German pedagogue, Wehrmacht officer, and local historian

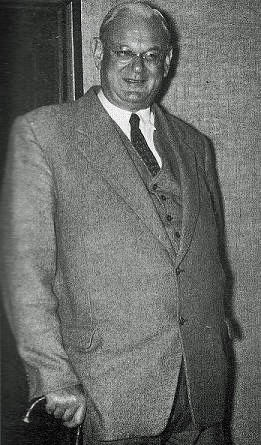
Hans Stuhlmacher

Hans Albert Alexander Louis Carl Stuhlmacher (1892–1962) was a German pedagogue, Wehrmacht officer and local historian.

== Life and works ==
Hans Stuhlmacher was born on 16 May 1892 in Lüneburg, the son of a district court chancery clerk (Landgerichtskanzlist), Friedrich Stuhlmacher, and his wife, Emma, née Ebbeke. On 11 November 1915 he married Margarethe Klinkhardt, by whom he had a son, Hans Georg.

At the end of 1940 Hans Stuhlmacher was called up for Wehrmacht service for the second time. In late 1943 he reached the rank of major. For many years Stuhlmacher was headmaster of the senior boy's grammar school in Walsrode and district local history curator of the old district of Fallingbostel. He died in Walsrode on 26 February 1962, shortly before the publication of his book, the Geschichte der Stadt Walsrode ("History of the Town of Walsrode") in September that year.

== Works ==
- Chronik des Kreises Fallingbostel. Der Zeitabschnitt von 1866-1900. Gronemann, Walsrode 1926
- Das alte Amt Rethen 1669. Gronemann, Walsrode 1926
- Der Kreis Fallingbostel. Ein Heimatbuch des Kreises. Hrsg.: Kreisausschuß des Kreises Fallingbostel. Kunstdruck- u. Verlagsbüro Magdeburg, [Grünberg] 1935
- Die Heidmark. Engelhard, Hannover 1939
- Der Würger vom Lichtenmoor, Gaatz, Fallingbostel 1949
- Geschichte der Stadt Walsrode. Bearb. u. zusammengestellt im Auftrag der Stadtverwaltung. Stadtverwaltung, Walsrode [Rathaus] 1964
- Die Heidmark. Scheling, Walsrode 1976

== Eponymous road ==
- In Bad Fallingbostel there is a Hans-Stuhlmacher-Straße.
