= Hassel =

Hassel may refer to:

== Places ==
- Hassel (Bergen), a municipality in the borough of Bergen, Lower Saxony, Germany
- Hassel (Weser), a municipality in the district of Nienburg, Lower Saxony, Germany
- Hassel, Saxony-Anhalt, a municipality in the district of Stendal, Saxony-Anhalt, Germany
- Hassel, Luxembourg, part of the municipality Weiler-la-Tour, Luxembourg
- Hassel Island, U.S. Virgin Islands
- Lake Hassel, a lake in Minnesota
- Hassel Sound
- A river in the Harz

== Other ==
- Hassel (surname)
- Hassel (TV series), Swedish TV series

== See also ==
- Hassell (disambiguation)
