= Church of St. Fabian and St. Sebastian, Sülze =

Ss. Fabian and Sebastian
- Fabian-und-Sebastian-Kirche
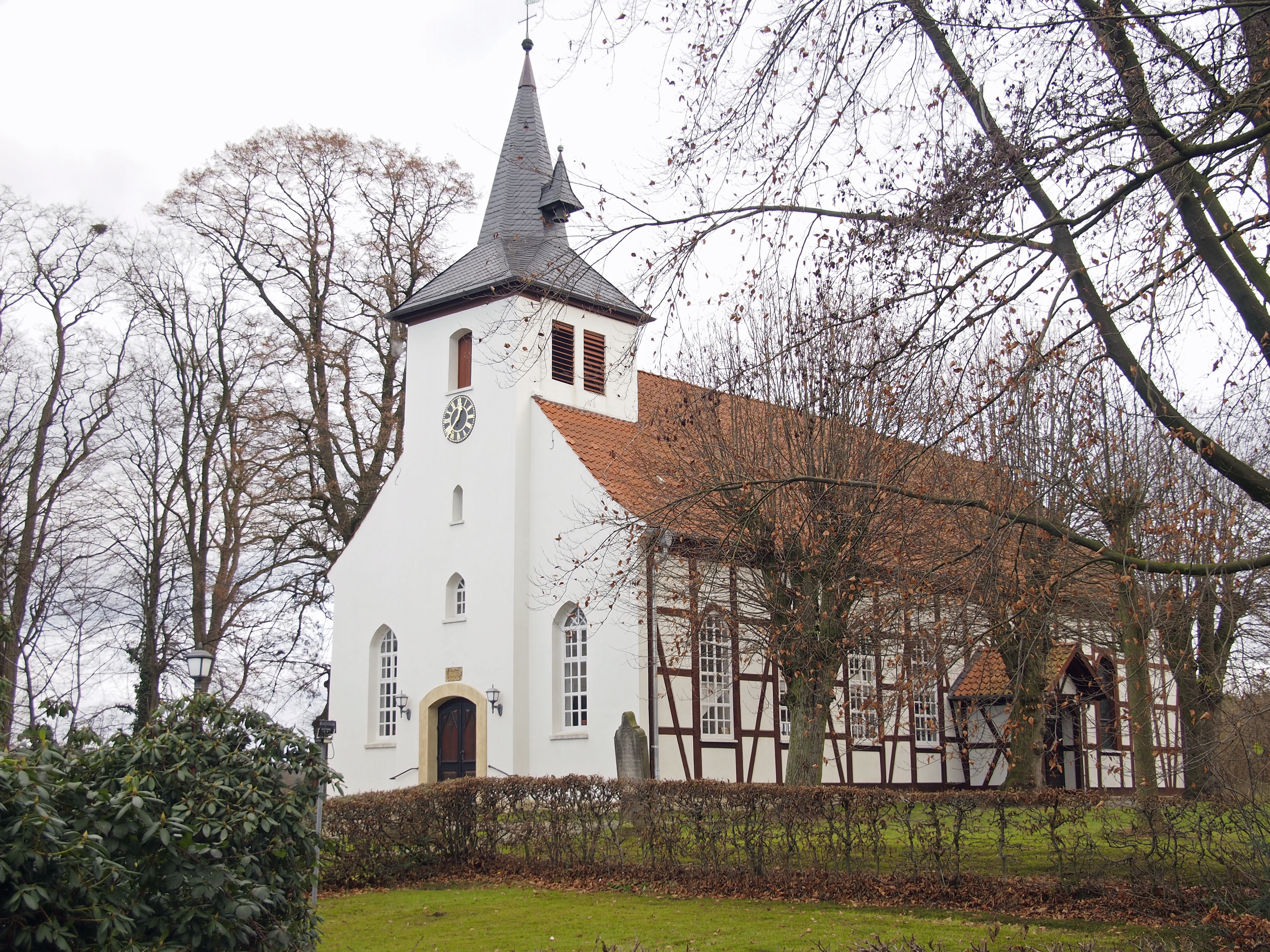
- Church of Ss. Fabian and Sebastian, Sülze

- Location within Lower Saxony Location within Germany
- 52°46′16.4″N 10°02′18.6″E
- Location: Sülze
- Country: Germany
- Denomination: Lutheran
- Website: www.kirche-suelze.de

History
- Status: parish church
- Dedication: Pope Fabian; Saint Sebastian

Architecture
- Functional status: active
- Completed: 1754

Administration
- Deanery: Celle
- Parish: Sülze

The Church of St. Fabian and St. Sebastian (German: Fabian-und-Sebastian-Kirche) in Sülze, Lower Saxony, Germany is a church of the Evangelical-Lutheran parish in the church district (Kirchenkreis) of Celle and in the Evangelical-Lutheran State Church of Hanover.

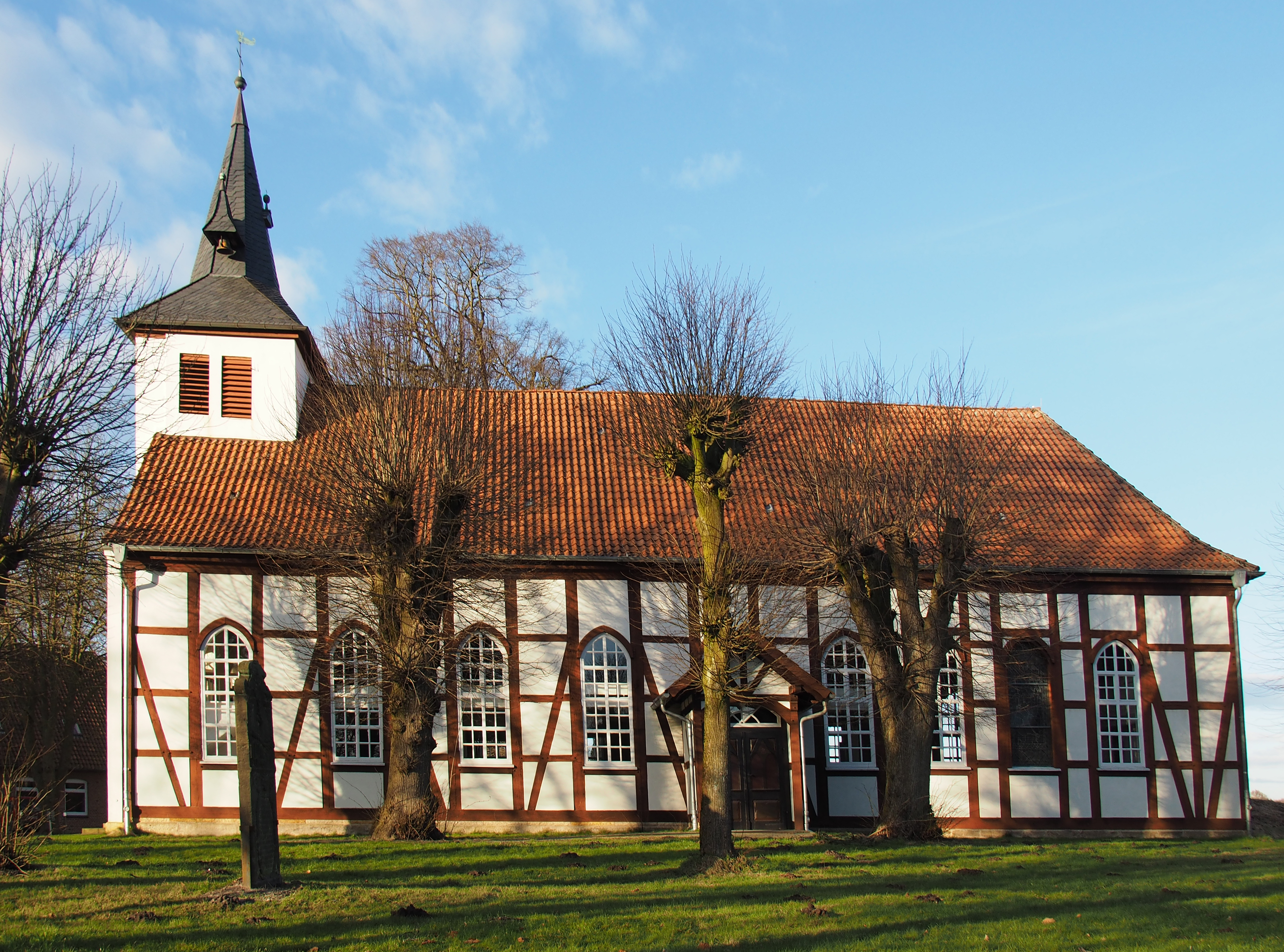
The Church of St. Fabian and St. Sebastian in Sülze, built in 1754

== History of the parish ==
From the time of the high Middle Ages (about 1000 to 1250), the villages in the present-day parish of Sülze belonged to the parish of St. Lambertus in Bergen. However, poor road conditions and the resulting poor attendance at the church in Bergen led in 1475 to efforts by the Duke of Celle, Frederick the Pious, to build a chapel dedicated to Saint Fabian and Saint Sebastian in Sülze. To begin with the chapel was not given its own rectorate, but was looked after by the priest at Bergen, who celebrated mass there once a week.

In 1502 a church foundation was established by brothers Carsten and Otto von Harling, and an Eversen widow, Gesche Vlothwedel. A large sum of money, which two years later was topped up, was with the authority of Bishop Henry III of Minden and of the church leaders (Kirchenherren) of Bergen invested in the Monastery of St Michael (Kloster St. Michaelis) in Lüneburg and from the interest, a rectorate was established for Sülze. In the foundation deed of 1504 the duties of the priest and the rights of the parish of St. Lambertus for Sülze were reallocated to the Sülze church and the rights of the patron, the von Harling family, were set out in detail. For example, the new priest had to live in Sülze, hold three masses a week and say intercessory prayers for the patron and his family. The rights of the church patron consisted mainly of the right of the appointment of the church warden and sidesmen (Opferleute), the enfeoffment of the farms belonging to the parish and the inspection of church accounts. Otherwise, the rights of the Bergen church remained in existence apart from a settlement in 1645.

Exactly when the Reformation was introduced into the parish of Sülze cannot be stated with certainty, but based on the adoption of the new doctrine, it can be deduced that it would have been no later than 1529. In addition to the villages of Eversen and Sülze, parish of Sülze was joined by Altensalzkoth in 1725, Huxahl, Lindhorst und Diesten in 1869, Feuerschützenbostel in 1927, Kohlenbach in 1963, Bergen in 1971 and Miele und Rehwinkel in 2001.

Today, in addition to the Sunday service, there are numerous other activities, including music groups, choirs, Bible groups and various events for young people. The current pastor is Sören Bein.

== Church buildings ==
=== First chapel of 1475 ===
The first chapel in Sülze was built in 1475 on the initiative of the Duke of Celle, Frederick the Pious. The exact location of this church has not been passed down. In the early 17th century the chapel had to be demolished due to its poor state of repair.

=== New early 17th-century church ===
In the early 17th century a new timber-framed church was built under the direction of the district magistrate (Amtsmann), Carl Dietrich. A clock tower was only built after the church had been finished, around 1624, but it stood slightly apart from the main church building. Due to subsidence of the foundations and rotting of the ground timbers this had become unsound by the middle of the 18th century. A survey carried out in 1745 recommended a new building, so the planned renovation measures were abandoned and a new church was planned.

=== Present church building of 1754 ===
In 1753 agreement was reached between the pastor, the church warden and the patron over the necessity for a new church. In parallel, a new clock tower was also to be built, but not separately as it had been hitherto, but integrated into the church building. In order to secure funding for the new church, petitions were lodged with various authorities and requests made from interested parties. The royal chamber was asked for oak wood, an application was made to the state church for permission to raise a collection and the farm owners in the parish were asked to commit funds and labour. By the end of January 1754 funding for the new church was ensured, so that the more important construction work was completed by December 1754 and the church could be consecrated. In 1897 building work took place to extend the nave from its original 19.3 metres to the present 27 metres. In 1932 and 1954 further major renovation work was carried out.

== Interior ==
=== Combined pulpit and altar ===
The pulpit dates to the 17th century and was already in use in the second Sülze church. As part of the new church in 1754 it was combined with a new altar wall and turned into a so-called Kanzelaltar or combined pulpit and altar. In the arcade spaces of the hexagonal pulpit there are oil paintings of the evangelists Luke, Mark and Matthew. Above the pulpit is a corona with the eye of God and a carved dove, which is a symbol of the Holy Spirit.

=== Holy sculptures ===
Left and right of the altar there are sculptures of the church's patron saints, Fabian and Sebastian. The 1.09 metre high figure of Sebastian dates to the late 15th century and was carved from oak. The original arrows as well as a forearm and a hand are missing. The painting has only been partially preserved. The figure of Saint Fabian was carved in 2000, also from oak, by Erich Klages.

=== Paintings ===
There are numerous paintings of former pastors in the church, including pictures from the early 17th century.

=== Baptismal font ===
The baptismal font, fashioned from sandstone dates to the year 1608 and was bestowed by the builder of the second Sülzer church, the Amtsmann, Carl Dietrichs. In 1898 the old font was replaced by a Neogothic one, but was returned to the church during the renovation in 1966.

=== Organ ===
The first organ was installed in the church in 1820, but was replaced several times in the following decades. The present organ was built by the Hanoverian firm of Emil Hammer Orgelbau and dedicated in 1986.

== Rectory and parish hall ==
The current rectory was built at the end of the 18th century on the initiative of the then pastor, Heinrich Schulze, who died of 'consumption' a few years later and did not live to see the new building. The parish hall, in which confirmation courses and other church activities are held, was built in 1939 after its predecessor had to be torn down as it had fallen into disrepair.

== Cemetery ==
Since the second church was built in the 17th century a piece of land immediately next to the church has been used as a cemetery. Due to a lack of space, a new one had to be laid out in the 1920s. After a long search the choice fell on a field at the exit to the village on the road to Eversen and in 1825 the first burial took place in the new cemetery. In the course of the following decades, the cemetery had to be extended several times. When the nave of the church was lengthened the patron's burial area in the crypt became available. In return for a hereditary graveyard, both lines of the von Harling family relinquished their right to be buried in the church. In 1965 a small chapel was built at the cemetery (extended in 1974 and 1991), so that funerals no longer had to be conducted in the church itself, as was usual until the 1960s, but could take place in the Chapel of Peace.

== Sources ==
- Kirchengemeinde Sülze - Festschrift zum Jubiläumsjahr 2004
- Franz Rathmann: Dorfbuch Eversen. Ein Haus- und Lesebuch, 1998, ISBN 3-921744-09-1
