= Sülze Saltworks =

The Sülze Saltworks (German: Saline Sülze) was a 'saline', or saltworks, on the Lüneburg Heath in Germany which was worked for centuries, from the High Middle Ages to 1862. It had a considerable impact on the history of the village of Sülze and other heath villages in the area.

== History ==
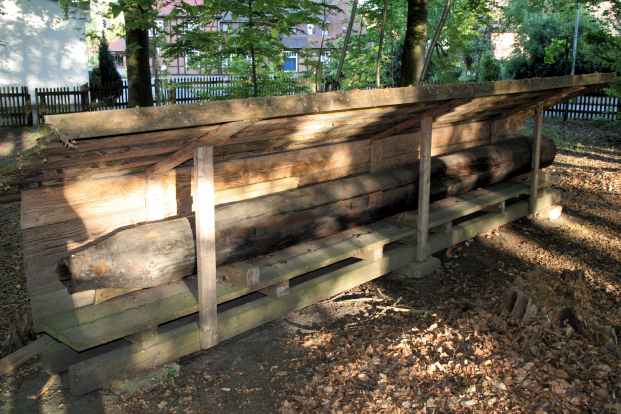
Wooden pipes for carrying brine from Sülze to Altensalzkoth

The saline is first mentioned in the records in 1381 and, from that time on, salt was extracted from brine in Sülze. The development of Sülze's salt spring was strongly encouraged by the dukes of the Principality of Lüneburg who wanted to create a counterbalance to the town of Lüneburg, which had largely succeeded in maintaining its independence from territorial lords as a result of the salt trade. This intent was never realised, however, because a glance at the quantities of salt produced demonstrates the overwhelming supremacy of the Lüneburg Saltworks. Whilst an average of 110,000 t of salt was extracted annually in Lüneburg, Sülze generated no more than 4,000 t. In addition, the salt content of the brine in Lüneburg was up to 25% whereas in Sülze it was a mere 5% and thus barely economical.

The right to extract salt lay with the Lüneburg dukes, but was leased to the owners of the salt pans.

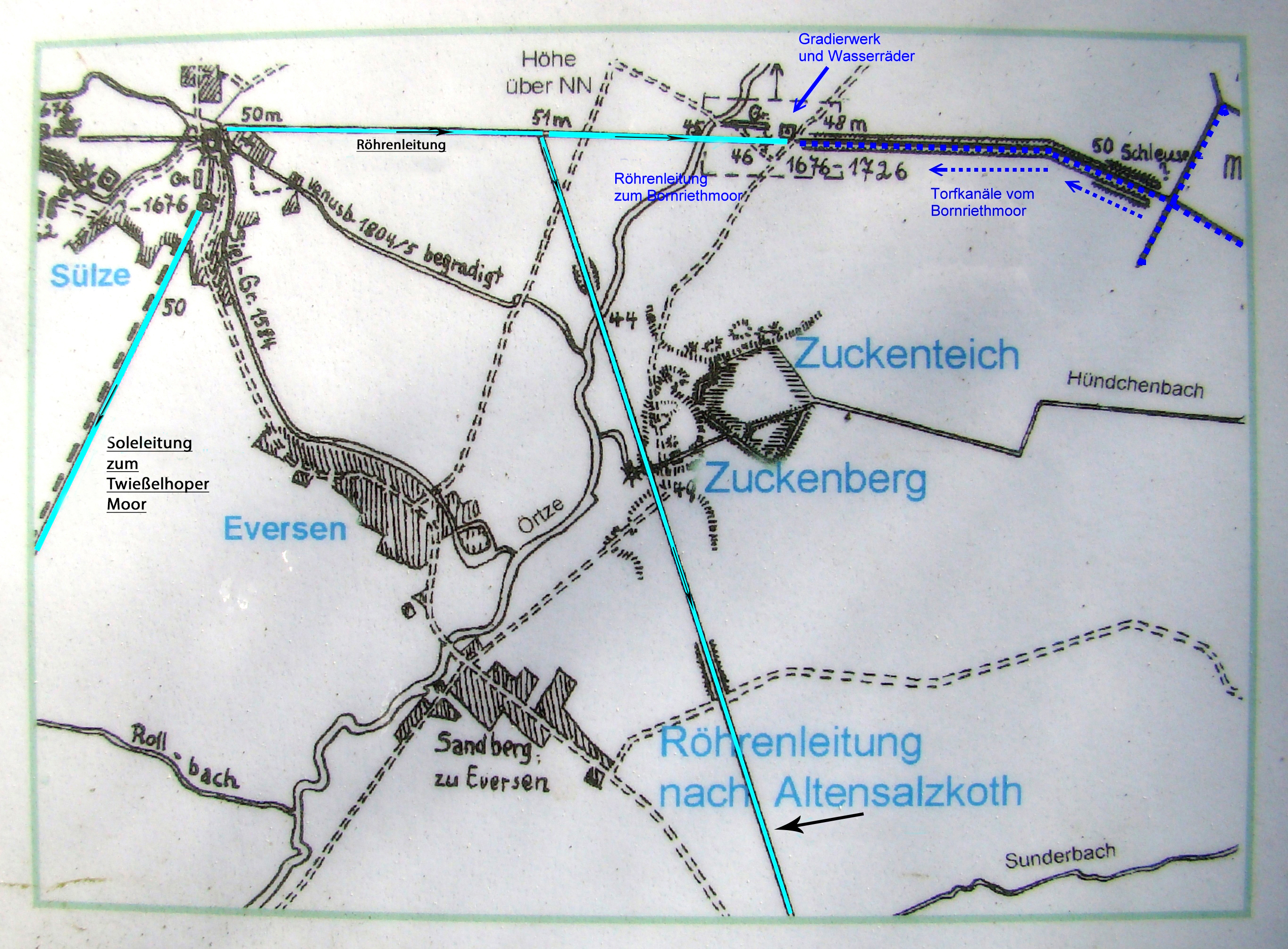
Route of the brine pipeline from Sülze to Altensalzkoth

Over the course of the centuries the boiling houses had to be moved several times into the surrounding villages due to the lack of fuel. All the peat in the vicinity of Sülze had already been used up and productive operation in the village itself was no longer possible. From 1673 to 1678 the boiling houses were transferred to Bornrieth Moor, where there were two salt houses and a graduation tower 200 metres long and 7 metres high. A boring mill was also built here for the manufacture of water pipes from tree trunks.

Brine was carried in wooden pipes from Sülze and peat delivered by boat using a canal excavated for the purpose. As early as 1719 there were discussions about moving the boiling houses again because Bornrieth Moor was exhausted. In the period from 1719 to 1725 the brine pipeline was relaid to the newly established village of Altensalzkoth in the "Scheuer Bruch" marsh. The existing pipes were moved from Lindhorst along the river Örtze eastwards past Eversen to the salt house at Altensaltzkoth. But because the brine had to be piped over a greater distance, other problems arose. At "Zuckenberg" the brine was pumped to a height of 5 m by a water-powered pump (Zucke) in order to achieve the required natural slope. Leaks and regular blockages in the pipes soon meant that economical production was no longer possible. This led finally to the boiling houses being relocated back to Sülze. To overcome the continued lack of fuel locally, an improved transportation system was established, enabling peat from the surrounding areas to be delivered to Sülze.

== Sources ==
- August Theiss - Die Geschichte der Saline zu Sülze 1979
