= Hassel (surname) =

Hassel is a German, Danish, Norwegian and Swedish surname. Notable people with this surname include the following:

- Bryan Hassel, American popular writer on education
- Danny Hassel (born 1967), American actor
- Georg Hassel (1770–1829), German geographer
- Henrik Hassel (1700–1776), Finnish professor and humanist
- Kai-Uwe von Hassel (1913–1997), German politician from Schleswig-Holstein associated with the CDU party
- Karl-Heinz von Hassel (1939–2016), German actor
- Kaspar Hassel (1877–1962), Norwegian sailor
- Odd Hassel (1897–1981), Norwegian physical chemist and Nobel Laureate
- Sverre Hassel (1876–1928), Norwegian polar explorer
- Tina Hassel (born 1964), German journalist
