= Brine pipeline =

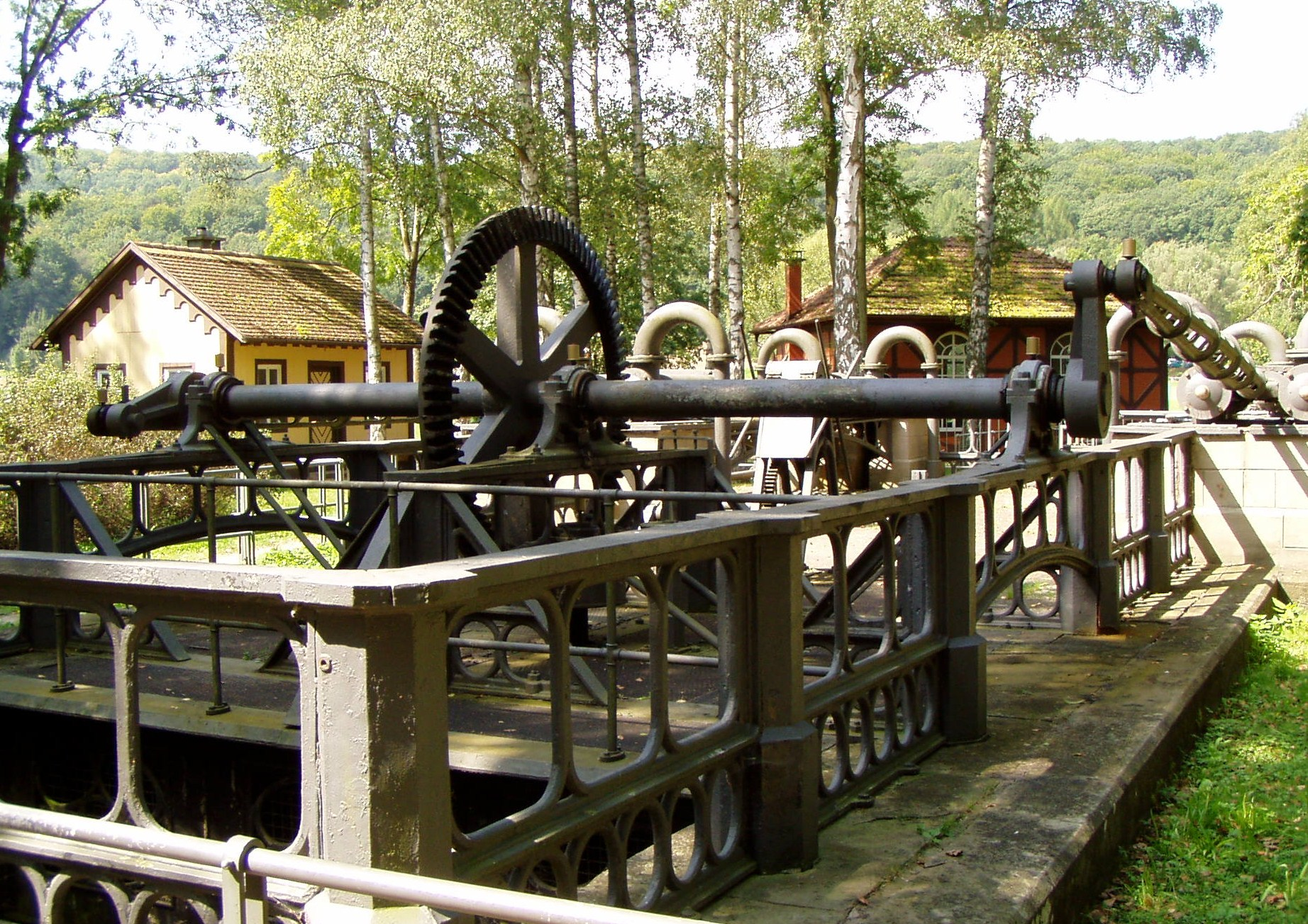
Brine pump of 1848 in Bad Kissingen, Germany.

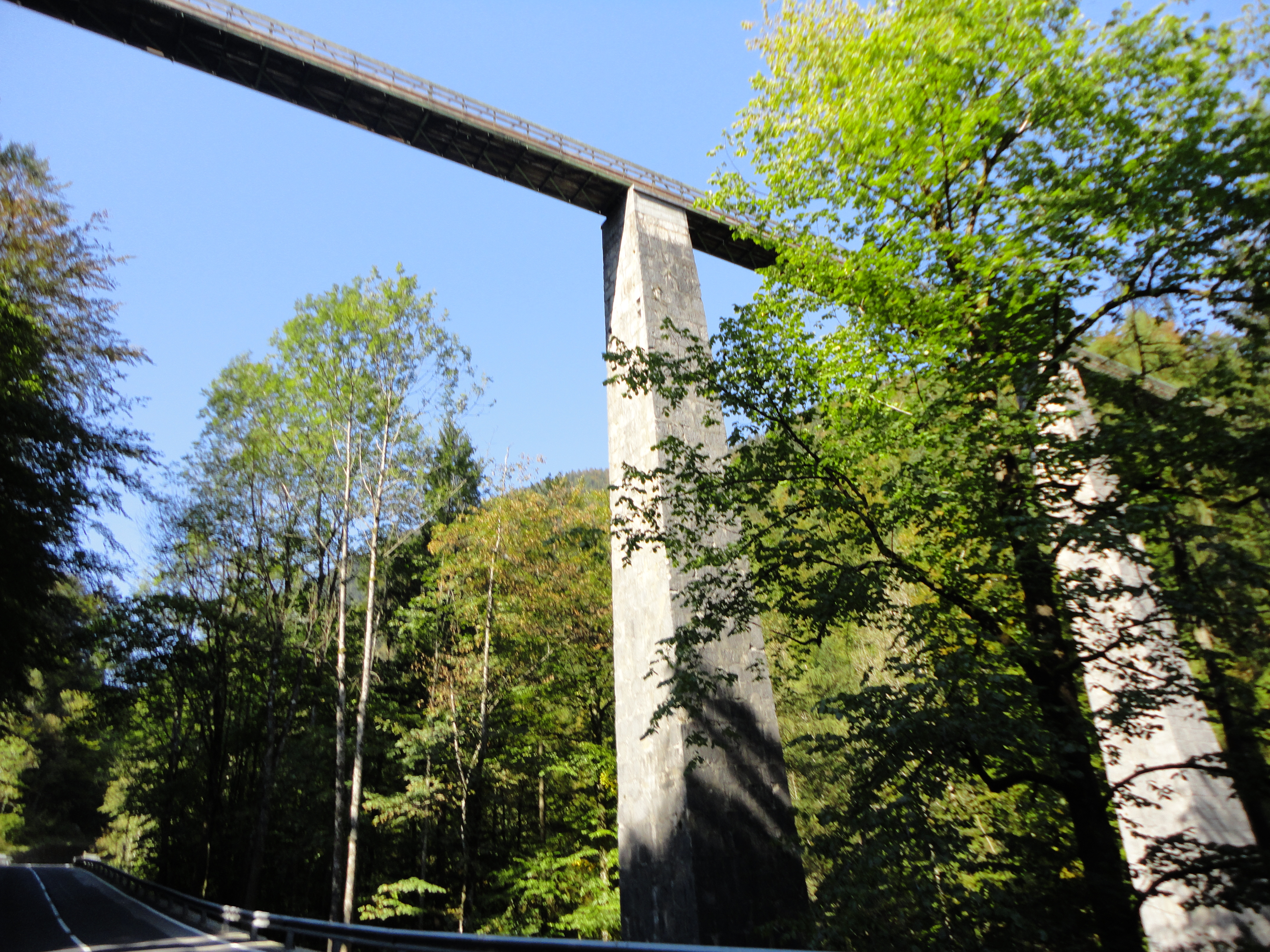
Gosauzwang, a brine pipeline bridge at Hallstatt today

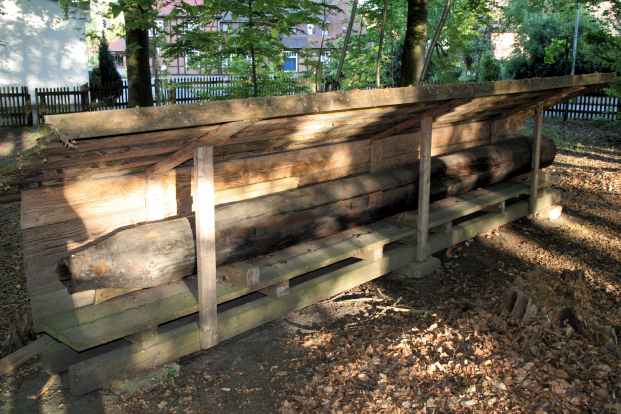
A wooden pipes for carrying brine from Sülze to Altensalzkoth

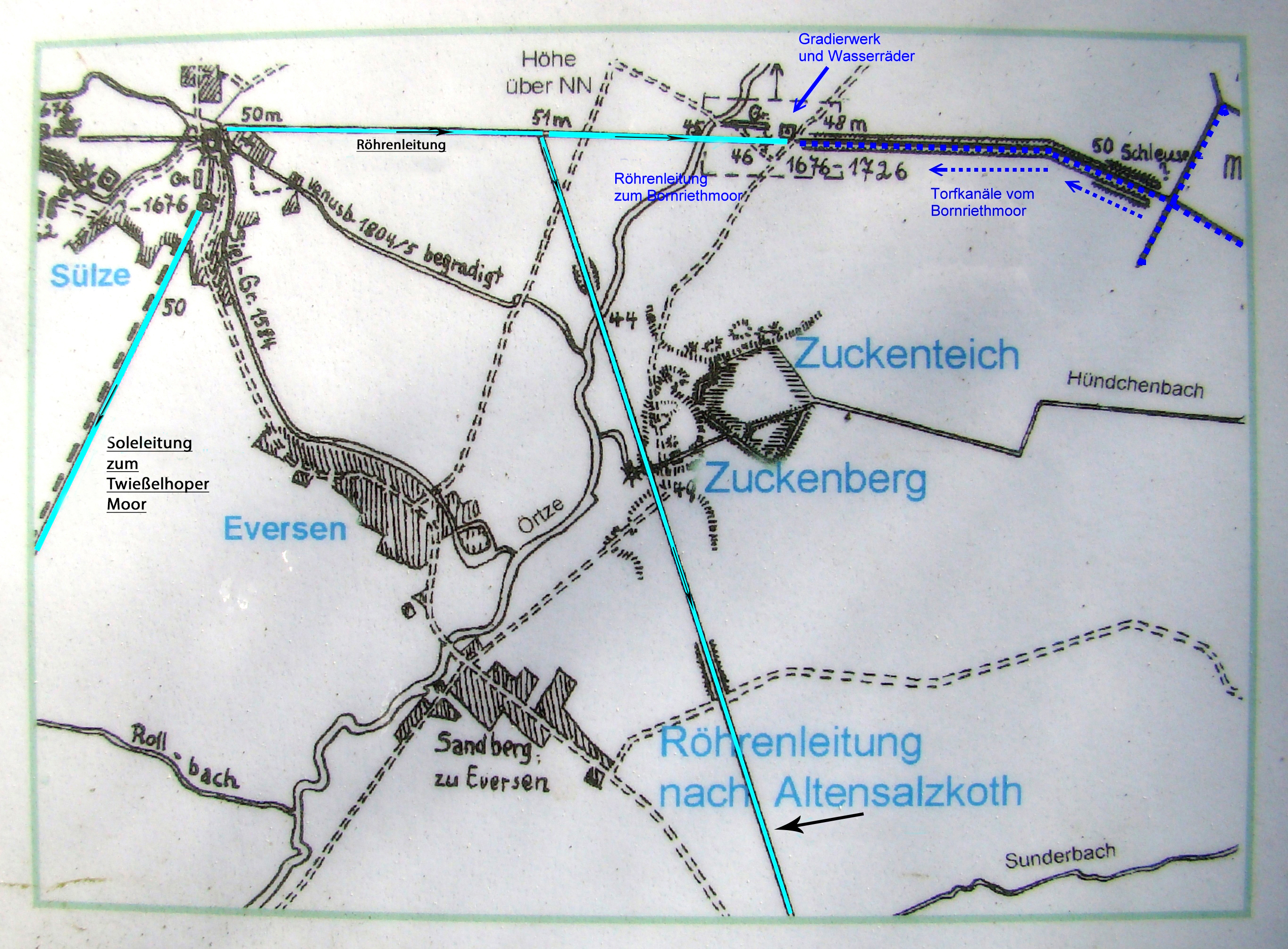
Brine pipeline map from Sülze to Altensalzkoth

A brine pipeline is a pipeline used to transport brine. It is a common way to transport salt from salt mines, salt wells and sinkworks to locations of salt evaporation (such as salterns, salt pans). Brine pipelines are also used in the oil and gas industries, and for removing salts and contaminants from water supplies.

== Salt mining ==
Brine pipelines were originally made of hollowed wood. One of the earliest known wooden pipelines ran from Bad Reichenhall to Traunstein and Rosenheim, Germany, in 1619.

An ancient brine pipeline may be traced along the Sentier du Sel, a 12.5 km trail in Chablais vaudois, Switzerland.
