= Jakob Gadolin =

Finnish and Swedish bishop (1719–1802)

The Right Reverend Jakob Gadolin
- Bishop of Turku
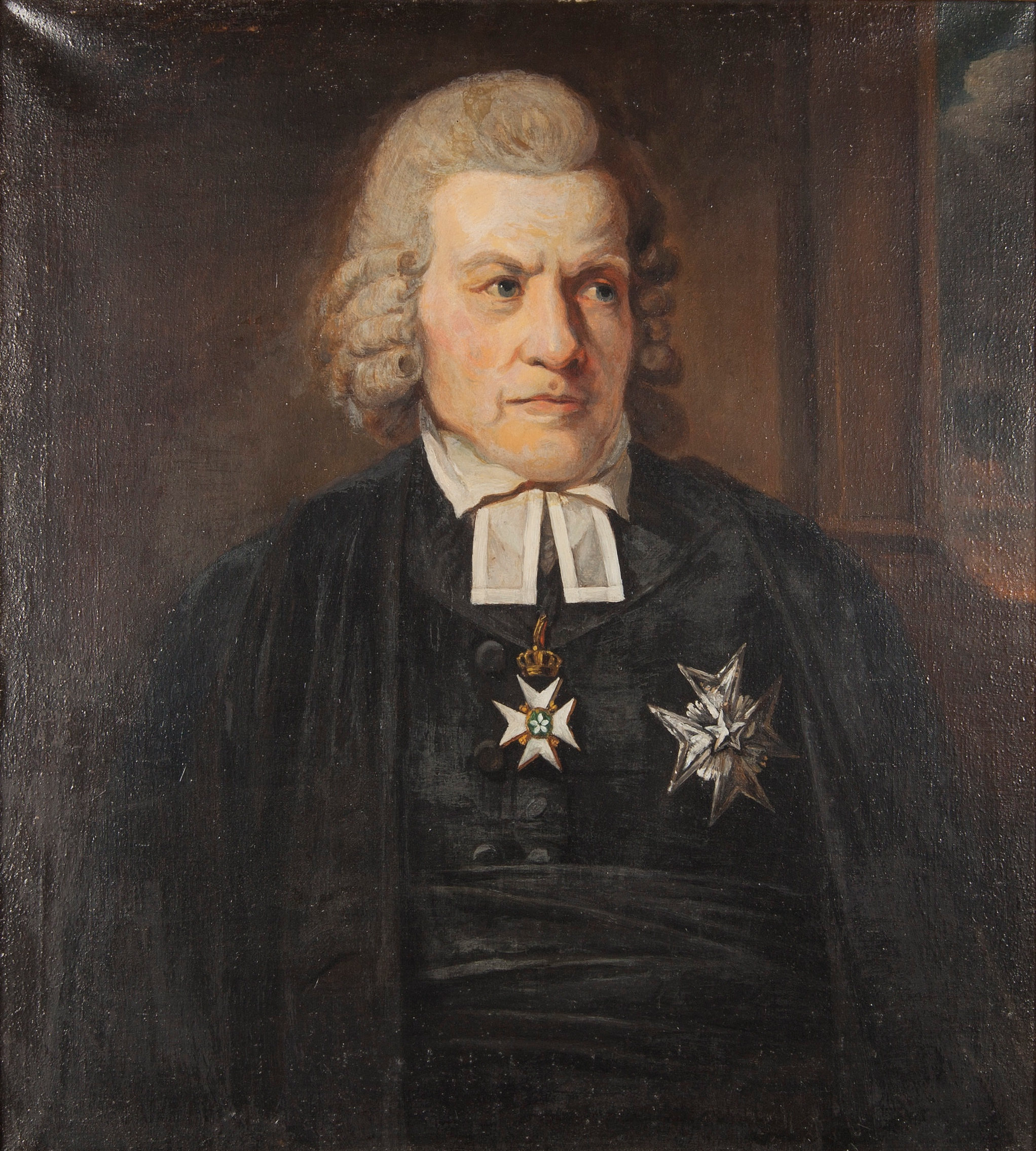
- Portrait by Carl Frederik von Breda, 1785
- Church: Church of Sweden
- Diocese: Turku
- Appointed: 5 June 1788
- In office: 1788–1802
- Predecessor: Jakob Haartman
- Successor: Jakob Tengström

Orders
- Ordination: 24 October 1752
- Consecration: 1788 by Carl Fredrik Mennander

Personal details
- Born: 24 October 1719 Strängnäs, Sweden
- Died: 26 September 1802 (aged 82) Turku, Finland
- Denomination: Lutheran
- Parents: Jakob Andersson Gadolin & Anna Danielsdotter Lignipaeus
- Spouse: Elisabet Browallia
- Children: 4

Jakob Gadolin (24 October 1719 – 26 September 1802) was a Finnish and Swedish Lutheran bishop, professor of physics and theology, politician and statesman. He worked as a professor of mathematics, astronomy, physics and theology at the Royal Academy of Turku and was appointed bishop of the Archdiocese of Turku in 1788. As a member of parliament, he was for a long time one of the leading representatives of the Hats party within the clergy. He is generally considered the pioneer of mathematical physics in Finland.

== Biography ==
Gadolin was born in Strängnäs, Sweden, where his family had fled from Finland during the Great Wrath, a period of Russian military occupation in Finland when Finland was under Swedish rule. The family moved back to Finland after the Treaty of Nystad in 1721. Gadolin's father, Jakob Gadolin, was a Finnish chaplain from Naantali and his mother was Anna Lignipaea.

In early 1728, the 8-year-old Gadolin began his schooling at the trivial school in Pori. As a student, Gadolin initially envisioned a career as a priest, but then developed an interest in Wolffian philosophy, particularly in mathematics. To finance his studies, he worked as a private tutor in Turku, including in the household of Professor Henrik Hassel. During the Lesser Wrath, Gadolin studied for several years at Uppsala University.

In 1736, he studied at The Royal Academy of Turku. In 1745, he became Master of Philosophy and Professor of Mathematics. Gadolin was also an observer, which is the title of a researcher at an observatory and university astronomical departments with a position below professor, at the Finnish Land Surveying Commission and the Academy of Turku and worked as an extraordinary professor of astronomy in 1748.

He became accomplished in numerous fields such as philosophy and mathematics and in 1753 he was named Professor of Physics, in 1756 to Doctor of Theology and in 1762 Professor of Theology. In 1788, he succeeded Jakob Haartman as the Bishop of the Archdiocese of Turku which was then a diocese of the Church of Sweden. He held this position until his death in 1802.

Gadolin published several works on mathematical and natural history subjects, including Om Åbo slotts belägenhet över vattenbrynet (1751), Om Åbo stads belägenhet, bestämd genom observationer (1753), and Observationer om Veneris inträde i solen den 3 juni 1769, utförda i Åbo (1769). During Gadolin's presidency, 43 academic dissertations were published, 35 in physics and 8 in theological subjects.

He served as a representative of the clergy in the Diocese of Turku in the Swedish Riksdag of the Estates 1755–56, 1760–62 and 1771–72. He made himself known as one of the most zealous members of the Hats party. However, he proceeded with great caution and was accused of a lack of openness as a result. During the coup in August 1772, he was imprisoned on the king's orders, and even later Gustav III seems to have considered Gadolin unreliable, until the 1780s when he firmly declared himself a royalist. Gadolin was also present at the Riksdags of 1786, 1789, 1792 and 1800.

In 1751, Gadolin was elected a member of the Royal Swedish Academy of Sciences. He was a member of Pro Fide et Christianismo, a Christian education society. He also worked as a bank auditor in 1785 and 1791 and in 1796 served as an auditor at the Swedish National Debt Office.

Gadolin had an extremely modern view of the aims and content of the natural sciences. In his research, Gadolin emphasised the importance of experimental physics and how it was closely related to theoretical physics. During his tenure as professor, mathematical methods increasingly gained ground in physics, not least in optics research. Together with mathematics professor Martin Johan Wallenius, he contributed to the establishment of differential and integral calculus at the Academy of Turku, and he is generally regarded as the pioneer of mathematical physics in Finland. Gadolin carried out triangulation measurements in the Åland and Turku archipelagos and made a number of astronomical observations, encouraging his students to conduct independent experiments.

Jakob Gadolin was married to Elisabet Browallia (1737–1793), daughter of the Bishop Johannes Browallius, and was the father of the noted chemist, Johan Gadolin.

== Awards ==
- Commander Grand Cross of the Order of the Polar Star, April 1789
- Asteroid 2638 Gadolin

== See also ==
- List of bishops of Turku

Religious titles
Preceded by Jakob Haartman	Bishop of Turku; 1788 — 1802	Succeeded by Jakob Tengström
