= Eversen (Bergen) =

- Ortsteil of Bergen
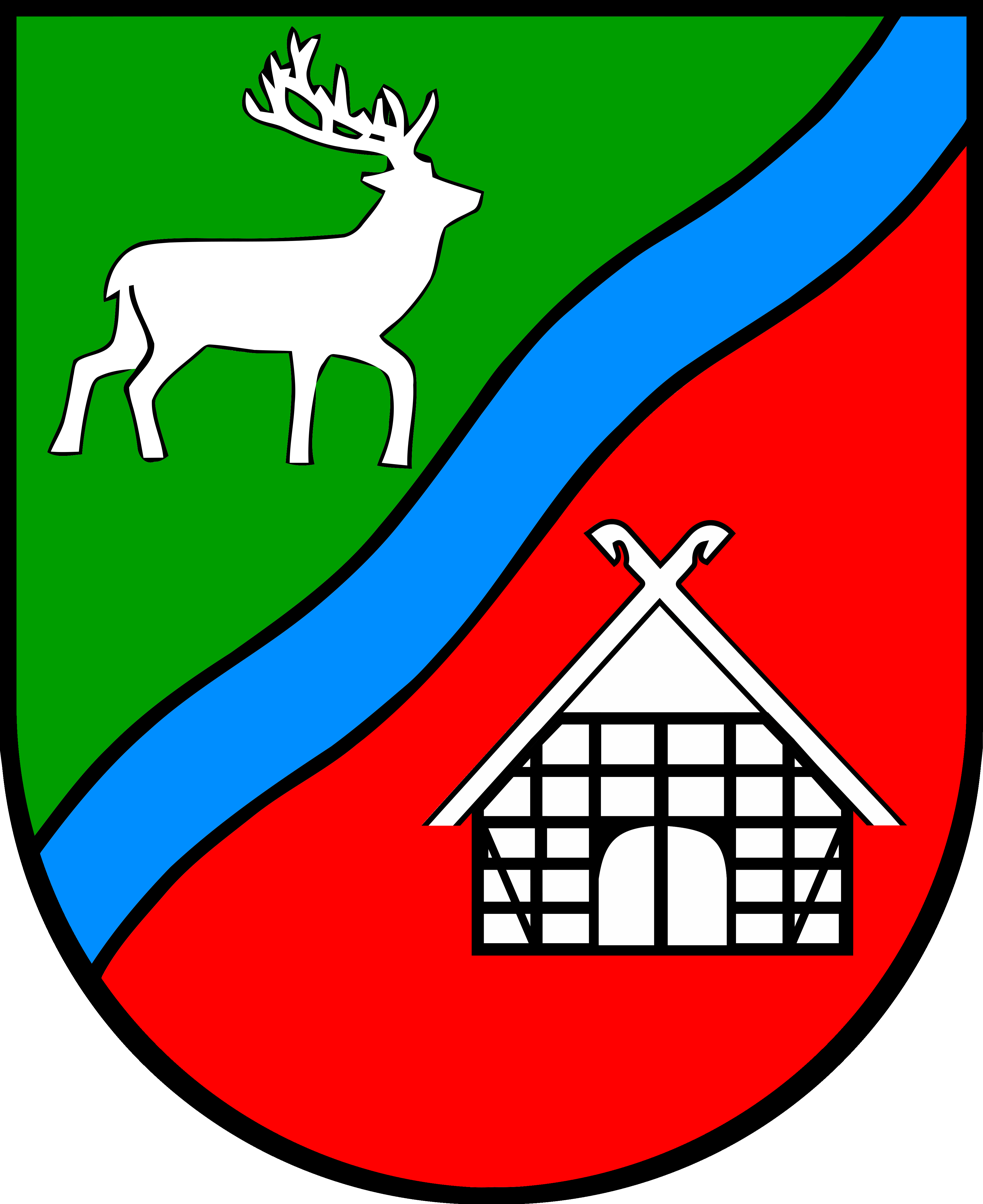
- Coat of arms
- Interactive map of Eversen
- Location within Germany Location within Lower Saxony
- Coordinates: 52°45′07″N 10°03′21″E
- Country: Germany
- State: Lower Saxony
- District: Celle
- Town: Bergen

Area
  - Total: 33.28 km^{2} (12.85 sq mi)
- Elevation: 82 m (269 ft)

Population (2019)
  - Total: 1,270
  - Density: 38.2/km^{2} (98.8/sq mi)
- Time zone: UTC+01:00 (CET)
  - Summer (DST): UTC+02:00 (CEST)
- Postal codes: 29303
- Dialling codes: 05054

Eversen is a village in the town of Bergen in the northern part of Celle district on the Lüneburg Heath in the north German state of Lower Saxony.

Although Eversen was mentioned for the first time in a feudal register dating from 1330, the earliest archaeological discoveries stem from the Paleolithic period. The village is on the edge of the Südheide Nature Park and was an independent municipality until it was incorporated into the borough of Bergen in 1973. It has an area of 3,328 hectares (8,220 acres) and a population of 1,270 inhabitants (2019).

== Geography ==
=== Geographical location ===
Eversen is located on the boundary of the Südheide Nature Park about 16 kilometres (9.9 mi) north of the town of Celle and about 10 kilometres (6.2 mi) southwest of Hermannsburg on the L 240 state road that runs from Celle to Hermannsburg. The village lies on a sandy island of loess in the glacial valley of the Örtze which was formed in the Weichselian Ice Age. It is responsible for administering the neighbouring hamlets of Feuerschützenbostel and Altensalzkoth and the farmstead of Kohlenbach. Feuerschützenbostel is about 2.5 km to the southwest, Altensalzkoth about 1.5 km southeast and Kohlenbach about 2.5 km southeast of Eversen.

=== Land use ===
Land use within the boundaries of Eversen village is shown on a 1983 usage map:

Use	Area	Use	Area
Crops / Gardens	305 ha	Meadows / Pastures	490 ha
Woods	2302 ha	Marsh	14 ha
Heath	4 ha	Roads / Water / Built-up areas	223 ha

=== Water bodies ===
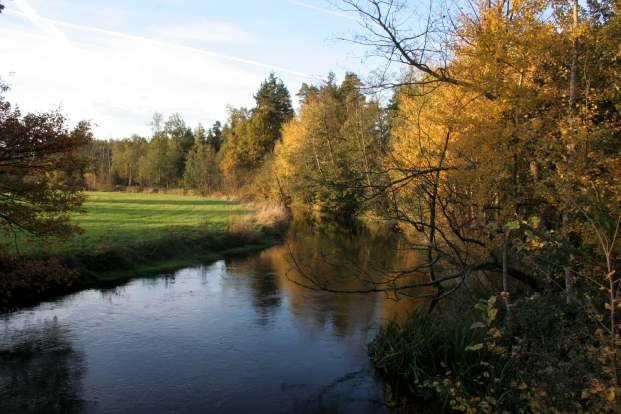
The River Örtze in Eversen

The River Örtze flows through Eversen, as do two streams: the Mühlenbach which runs from north to south through the old village (alte Dorf) and discharges into the Örtze, and the Bruchbach, which flows across the area. The Bruchbach acts as a drainage ditch but, in recent years, has also been used by the Eversen fishing club for breeding salmon.

In the Alter Dorf or "Old Village" there is a millpond belonging to the manor, Rittergut I, which was created in 1638. It had an original area of just under 0.75 hectares (1.9 acres), but was expanded in the 2nd half of the 20th century through the incorporation of other areas to 1.5 hectares (3.7 acres). Until the beginning of the 20th century it fed the mill owned by the manor; it was subsequently used in the 1970s and 1980s for fish farming.

Other water features include: a branch of the Örtze, the so-called Kolk; several fish ponds in the village of Feuerschützenbostel; and, in the Schummelsbruch, a wood east of the village centre, bodies of water that were established for the long-term storage of logs following a storm in 1972.

== History ==
This section deals solely with the history of Eversen and does not cover the neighbouring hamlets incorporated into its municipal area in 1929. For histories of those hamlets see their separate articles: Feuerschützenbostel, Altensalzkoth and Kohlenbach.

=== Prehistoric and early historic occupation ===
The earliest archaeological discoveries from Eversen date to the end of the Old Stone Age. Finds of flint tools, as well as the remains of fireplaces, are evidence of at least periodic settlement by itinerant hunter-gatherer cultures. Numerous finds from the Middle Stone Age testify to a dense settlement of the sand dunes lying east of the river Örtze in the area of the present-day village of Sandberg. In the New Stone Age and the transition from an appropriative to a productive way of life, the sand dunes proved unsuitable for agriculture and were largely abandoned as places of settlement. Only on the so-called Kolk and on the Lerchberg is there evidence of settlers during that period. There, access to water and the relatively better quality of soil in comparison with the other sites nearby provided the essential requirements for arable farming. There are no traces of settlement in the area of the village from the Ice Age, i.e. the time from about 800 BC to 400 AD.

=== Emergence of the village of Eversen ===
The emergence of the farming village of Eversen cannot be precisely dated, but it can be deduced, firstly, from the long, narrow, parallel strips of arable land (Langstreifenfeldern) that predominate here and, secondly, from the evolution of the village name, that Eversen appeared in the 9th century at the latest. At that time Eversen belonged to the old Saxon district of Loingau. The village was not, however, mentioned in the records until 1330 where it is recorded in a deed of enfeoffment (Lehnsurkunde) under the name of Euersten.

=== Estates ===
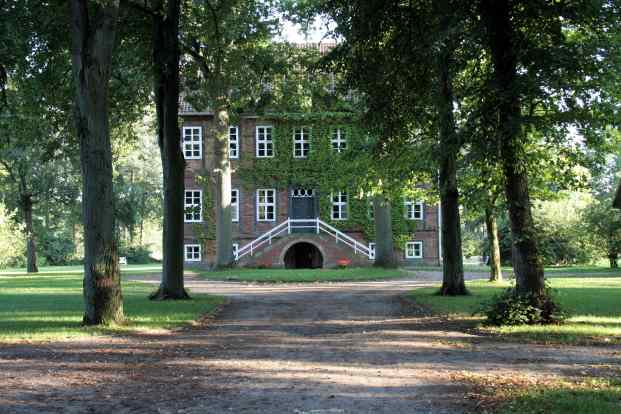
The manor house of the Rittergutes I estate built in 1792

In Eversen there are three manorial estates (Rittergüter) to which the local farms used to belong. These farms had to pay various obligatory contributions and services to the lords of the manor (Gutsherren).

The first estate, Gut I, the so-called Sedelhof, lies east of the village street. It is bordered to the north and east by mill ditches, to the west by the millpond and to the south by the river Örtze. It is thus entirely surrounded by water and only accessible over a wooden bridge. Due to its good location it is thought to be one on the oldest estates in Eversen. The estate was first mentioned in the records in 1424. In a deed of enfeoffment by the Duke of Lüneburg, a certain Carsten von Harling, amongst others, was enfeoffed a farm in Eversen. Because the enfeoffment was "from time immemorial" (von alters hero gehabt) it can be assumed that Gut I had been in the possession of the Harling family from the end of the 14th century. The estate was one of the few in the Principality of Lüneburg that was furnished with a keep (Bergfried), or fortified tower. The present building dates from the year 1792, when the King's Council, Carl August von Harling, had a new manor house and stables built in timber-framed style.

Gut II, known as the Majorshof, lies at the southern end of the Old Village, west of the village street. Until the 15th century it was owned by the von Hodenberg family who had allocated it as a mesne fief (Afterlehen) to the Tiebermann family. In 1495 the estate was first enfeoffed to the von Harling family. The estate remained in the possession of the Tiebermann family as before, who were therefore the sub-vassals (Aftervasallen) of the von Harlings. When the Tiebermanns died out in the 17th century the estate was not reallocated but went to Major Anton Johann von Harling. He had the manor house built which was completed in 1686. The Majorshof ("Major's Farm") was named after him. His son inherited Gut II as well as Gut I from his uncle, so that the two estates were once again owned by one person.

Gut III, the Beckerhof, lies in the centre of the Old Village, west of the village street. It was originally an ordinary farm that paid manorial contributions and did not achieve the status of a manorial estate until the beginning of the 17th century. As a result of a distribution of inheritance, the older line of the von Harling family, which had its seat at Gut I, relinquished the estate to the so-called younger line of the family, who were thereupon incorporated into the enfeoffment. The current structure, a timber-framed manor house, was built in the late 18th century.

=== The farming village of Eversen ===
In 1378 a Celle tax register named three full-time farmers (Vollbauern) as taxpayers to the Duke of Celle. Because the register only lists those farms belonging to the duke under the manorial system, it cannot be ascertained whether, at that time, other farms already existed. Shortly thereaftere there was a division of the three farms that were subservient to the duke into three cotter farms. In the Celle revenue record of 1381, five farms are recorded as being obligated to the Duke of Celle. In addition there was a farm belonging to Eversen's Gut II, so that at that time it can be reckoned that there were 6 manorial farms under the Duke.

At the beginning of the 15th century the village was further extended. The enfeoffed occupants of the Eversen estates used their land to create other farms subordinate to them. In a treasury register (Schatzregister) from 1438 as many as twelve people are listed as paying tribute (Schatz). From the tax records it can be ascertained that, at that time, there were 3 estates (Vollhöfen) and 9 cotters (Kötner).

In the 16th and 17th centuries the village continued to expand. Growth halted temporarily, however, after the establishment of a cotter farm obligated to Gut I in 1692. At that stage, Eversen consisted of 22 manorial farms, a community Hirtenhaus and the three manorial estates of the von Harling family. In addition there were the houses of the small farmers and hirelings. Because they only had small holdings of land and no grazing rights on the commons, their occupants earned their living by working on the estates or as salt drivers for the Sülze Saltworks.

Unlike most of the other heath villages in the southern Lüneburg Heath, Eversen was spared from the ravages of war and pillaging or burning by hostile troops during its history. The surrounding bogs provided a natural defence for the village. However the contributions required from the farmers as a consequence of the Thirty Years War were a heavy burden that hindered village expansion for decades and led to the abandonment of many farms.

Two epidemics of the Black Death in 1581 and 1642 caused many deaths and the extinction of several family lines.

The 19th century was characterised by extensive agricultural reforms. Fundamental to subsequent reforms was the general division (Generalteilung) of land at the beginning of the 19th century, whereby the villages were given fixed boundaries and every piece of land was allocated to a municipality (Gemeinde). The amount of land around the individual villages which was allocated to them was based on the grazing rights they had held in the past.

This was followed during the period 1838 to 1858 by the division of common land (Gemeinheitsteilungen). Common land, i.e. those areas which had hitherto been shared by the community, was now transferred to the individual farms as freehold property based on their existing rights to the common land.

On the basis of the Kingdom of Hanover's 1833 redemption law, the obligations on farms under the manorial system were repealed. Farms to which the so-called manorial rights applied had been hitherto obliged to give numerous services and make frequent payments to the manor. That was now repealed on payment of 25 times the annual dues and the land was then granted under freehold into the farmers' ownership.

These reforms led to an agricultural boom, the evidence of which can still be seen today in the numerous farmhouses that were built at that time. Another consequence of the repealing of manorial obligations was that property could be now freely sold. That created the conditions for the establishment of new farms. In the 2nd half of the 19th century a large number of new houses appeared on the so-called Sandberg ("Sand Hill"), the part of Eversen east of the Örtze, and the population of the village grew markedly.

Ninety-nine men from Eversen took part in the First World War, 29 of whom were killed. The unrest that following the end of the war led in 1919 to a decision by the parish council to form a village defence force of 25-30 men. One year later this was disbanded and, for the next 6 months, two night watchmen were employed.

=== Administrative history ===
From the 14th century Bergen was recorded as having a vogtei's office, the lowest level of administration and justice, which was presided over by a ducal vogt. Subordinated to it since the 15th century was the administrative post in Sülze, which was responsible for the church parish of Sülze to which Eversen belonged. Matters of importance that only affected Eversen were discussed and decided by the Realgemeinde, i.e. the farm owners who had common land rights. The political reforms of the 19th century brought about a fundamental change from which the political municipality of Sülze arose. Participation in the resolution of village affairs was no longer dependent on ownership of property or land; instead every male villager over 25 had the right to vote.

=== Religion ===
Until the 16th century Eversen belonged to the parish of St. Lambert in Bergen. Because the distance of 9 kilometres (5.6 mi) made regular church attendance difficult or, in bad weather on the muddy paths, impossible, a chapel was built in 1475 at the neighbouring village of Sülze, which was overseen by the pastor at Bergen. In 1502 an endowment was given by the owner of Eversen's Gut I, which gave Eversen its own rectorate. Since then Eversen has belonged to the parish of Sülze.

=== Eversen since 1929 ===
In the course of a municipal reform in 1929 the hitherto independent villages of Altensalzkoth and Feuerschützenbostel and the farmstead of Kohlenbach were incorporated into the parish of Eversen.

In 1934 with the change of office, Albert Buhr became the first Nazi Bürgermeister. In the elections to the German Reichstag 30% of the votes went to the NSDAP; in 1933 this had risen to 60%.

Eversen was unaffected by the hostilities Second World War, although a Messerschmitt Bf 109 crashed into the garden of an Eversen farmer during an air battle in the area of Hanover and Brunswick. One of the two pilots died in the crash, the other was able to save himself by parachuting out. A total of 182 Eversen villagers took part in the war, 84 of whom died.

As a result of denazification the former Bürgermeister resigned and several Eversen folk were classified as Minderbelastete. In 1945 and 1946 the so-called logging reparations resulted in about 120,000 - 150,000 cubic metres of wood being felled in the parish of Eversen.

The years after the Second World War were characterised by an influx of refugees. In the years that followed, many new houses were built on the Sandberg and the number of inhabitants rose sharply. Whilst this growth resulted in a very different appearance in the surrounding villages, the 'old village' (alte Dorf) largely retained its character and appearance and, even today, is dominated by timber-framed houses.

As part of the Lower Saxon regional and administrative reforms in 1973, Eversen lost its independence and, since then, has been a municipality within the borough of Bergen.

In 1972 Hurricane Quimburga, which destroyed 10% of the woodland area in Lower Saxony, also caused considerable damage in the municipality of Eversen. The fire on the Lüneburg Heath in 1975 destroyed large areas of woodland in the Kohlenbach, which belongs to Eversen, as well as on Eversen Mathheide heath. In 1997 another storm caused massive damage, during which most of the Gehege, a wood adjacent to Gut I was blown down.

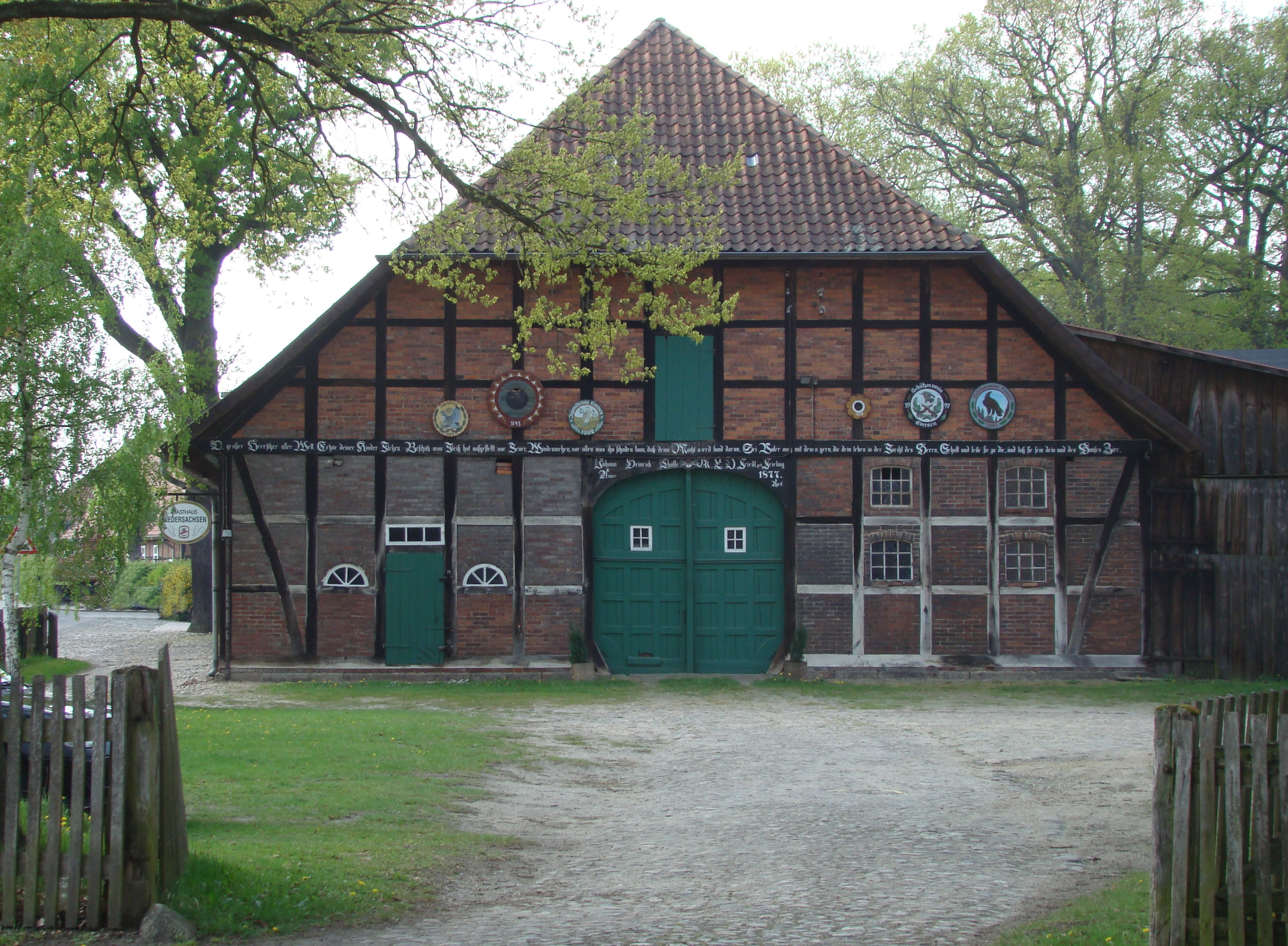
The Gasthaus Niedersachsen, scene of the 1988 TV series, Petticoat

In 1988 a television team was looking for a Lower Saxon village that had survived in its original state, with cobblestones, old farmhouses and a corner shop. In Eversen they discovered all of these things. They wanted to film village life in the 1950s. Under the direction of Wigbert Wicker many of the scenes were filmed in the Gasthaus Niedersachsen ("Lower Saxony Inn"), a Lower Saxon house still largely preserved in its original state. The planned conversion of a shop in the village, which was also the location of many scenes, was delayed whilst filming took place. Well-known German actors and actresses such as Timothy Peach, Ulrich Pleitgen, Konstantin Graudus, Ferdinand Dux and Doris Kunstmann starred. Six episodes were filmed. The first broadcast under the name of Petticoat took place on 9 November 1989 on Das Erste.

== Population ==
=== Growth ===
In 2000 Eversen had 1,426 inhabitants. Since 1821 regular censuses have been carried out that give a clear picture of the pattern of population in Eversen. The sudden rise in numbers after the Second World War is probably due to the influx of refugees.

Year	Population	Houses	Year	Population	Houses	Year	Population	Houses
1821	352	49	1910	543	90	1961	1055	---
1848	364	54	1925	581	109	1969	1127	190
1859	387	52	1939	737	116	1980	1339	---
1900	536	63	1950	1352	151	1994	1411	---

=== Language ===
Eversen belongs to the Low German language area and the Northern Low Saxon dialect group. Since the end of the Second World War, however, High German has largely superseded it. However, Low German continues to be used colloquially especially amongst the older members of the village.

=== Religion ===
The majority of the Eversen population is Protestant evangelical and the parish responsible for the village is the Church of St. Fabian and St. Sebastian in Sülze. In 1993 only 90 inhabitants belonged to the Roman Catholic parish in Bergen, which is responsible for Eversen. Since the influx of Kurdish families in the 1980s there has been a sizeable minority of Yazidis in Eversen.

== Politics ==
Since the merging of local councils as part of the Lower Saxon administrative reforms of 1971, Eversen has been part of the town of Bergen. Eversen is represented by a local council (Ortsrat) and a council chairman (Ortsbürgermeister). The council is empowered, inter alia, to make decisions about public services in the village, is responsible for maintaining the appearance of the village and for overseeing its clubs and societies, and has to be consulted by the town of Bergen on all important matters affecting the village. It consists of five elected representatives who, together with the chairman, sit on the Bergen borough council. The village council elects its own chair. The current incumbent is Gerd Friedrich (CDU).

== Culture ==
=== Places of interest ===
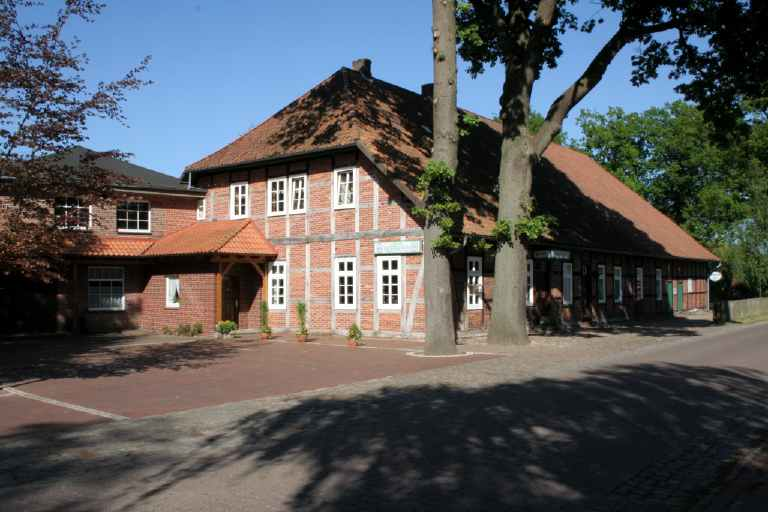
A timber-framed house (Fachhallenhaus) in Eversen built in 1877.

In the alten Dorf part of Eversen along the village street there are numerous four-post, timber-framed houses from the 19th century and which are listed buildings today. Opposite the Mühlenteich ("Millpond") is Peets Schmidt Kote, a two-post house dating to 1754, one of the oldest, surviving farmhouses in the region.

The three manor houses, with buildings from the 17th (Gut II) and 18th (Gut I and Gut III) centuries are also protected.

In the municipality of Eversen are several natural monuments including the entire group of trees at Gut I known as the Eichenhof ("Oak Grove") as well as an ancient oak, over 400 years old, on the edge of the Gehege.

=== Realgemeinde Eversen ===
Until the agrarian reforms of the 19th century and the associated division of land that had previously been owned in common, those with grazing rights on these common areas were the decision makers in village affairs. In the 19th century, therefore, the Realgemeinde suffered a major loss of influence and importance, but was reformed in 1892 as a public body. Its task was the management of those woodlands that remained in the ownership of the village council. Its members continued to be those who were entitled to be on the council, i.e. the owners of the 21 farms and the three manorial estates. In 1974 the remaining woods were divided among the members, only one in the parish of Sülze, with an area of 72 'morgen' was left under the jurisdiction of the Realgemeinde.

=== Societies ===
The Eversen Shooting Club of 1745 (Schützenverein Eversen von 1745) plays an important role in the village life of Eversen. It has over 470 village members and lays on numerous club events as well as the annual 'shooting festival' or Schützenfest. Eversen Shooting Club also has a marching band which arranges a large number of trips and performs several marching displays every year.

In 1969 the Eversen Angling Club (Fischerei-Verein Eversen) was founded; today it has over 70 members. In addition to managing a 3.5 km long section of the river Örtze, the club has rented a gravel pond in Feuerschützenbostel. On both water bodies there are regular fishing competitions. In addition the club looks after the Bruchbach in Eversen. In the Örtze attempts have been made in recent years to re-introduce the long-extinct salmon into the local rivers again.

The Eversen Male Voice Choir (Männergesangverein Eversen von 1888) was founded in 1888 and re-activated in 2006. MGV Eversen has about 25 male singers.

The amateur dramatic society founded in the 1950s and known as the Dorfbühne Eversen (Eversen Village Stage) has to date put on a play of up to 3 acts every year. The society comprises a large number of amateur actors who put a lot of effort into their hobby and persuade many Eversen villagers, including numerous young people, to go to the Gasthaus Niedersachsen every year.

Since 1962 there has been a group of first-aid workers, who train in civil protection, provide first-aid at events and run blood-donation clinics. Together with the Junior Red Cross they collect and sell paper for recycling from the villagers.

== Economy and Infrastructure ==
=== Economy ===
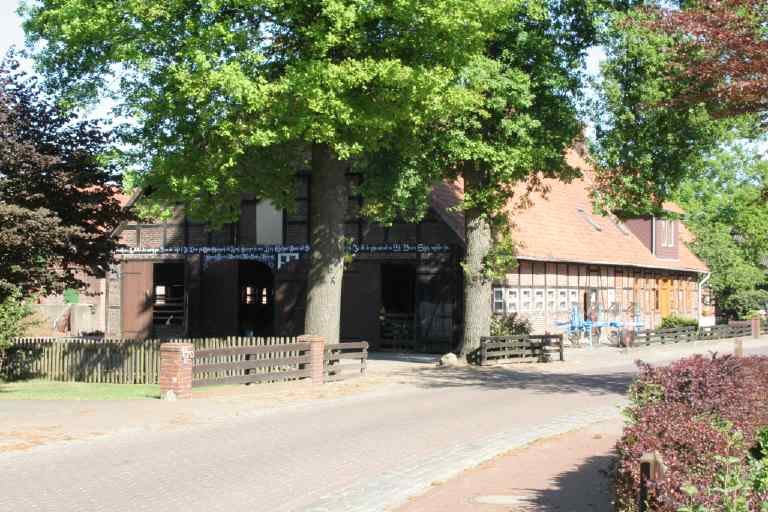
Walter Otte Farm - the last arable full-time farm in Eversen

Today agriculture has largely lost its former importance. Apart from a few businesses which are involved in agriculture as a sideline, there is only one full-time farm left.

Important economic drivers today are Landhandel Otte, an agricultural wholesalers, and the Heinrich Harling sawmill. Other medium-sized businesses in Eversen include the Klaus Otte garage, Thomas Dienelt the wrought ironmonger, Dieter Rossmann the joiner, Reinhard Peisker the timber-framing specialists, Ulrike Preusse the hairdressing salon and Norbert Herrmann the villager bakery.

In recent years tourism has also become increasingly important. Within the municipality of Eversen, the village of Altensalzkoth is home to the Hotel Helm, Feuerschützenbostel has a country café, the Mielmannshof, and Feuerschützenbostel Manor House rents holiday apartments.

=== Transport ===
Eversen lies on state road (Landesstraße) L 240 which runs from Celle to Hermannsburg. From 1902 to 1975 Eversen Station was part of a minor railway line (Kleinbahn) that linked the village with the town of Bergen and, following an upgrade of the line in later years, also with Hermannsburg and Celle. Buses on the Celle - Faßberg route operated by CeBus stop several times a day in Eversen and link the place with the surrounding villages.

=== Education ===
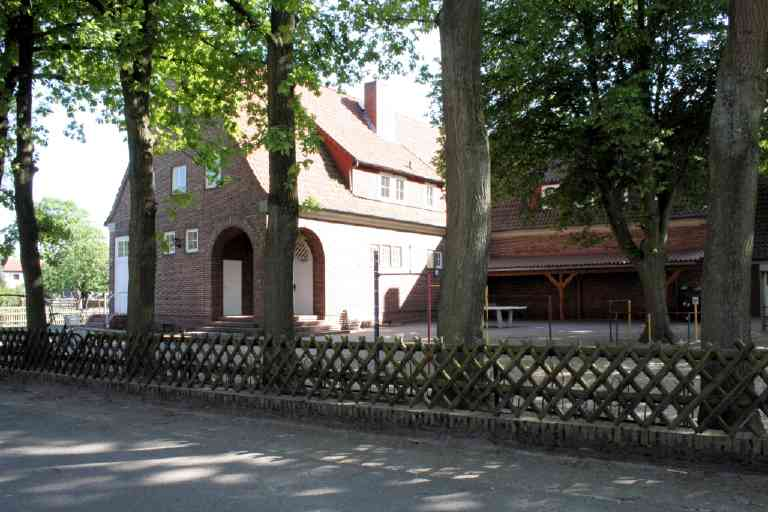
Eversen Primary School

The first indications of a school in Eversen date to the year 1673 when the schoolmaster, Friedrich Bussmann, was mentioned in a historical record. Teaching took place in the teacher's private residence who lived in the Hirtenhaus belonging to the village community. Not until 1820 did Eversen get its own school building, but this had to be demolished only 67 years later due to its dilapidated state. Its successor, completed in 1884, was used as a school until 1950. But when school numbers increased, particularly as a result of the influx of refugees, a new building needed. Since then this has housed the Eversen Primary School (Grundschule), where 4 teachers educate an average of 80 children.

=== Kindergarten ===
Prior to the 1990s the kindergarten in Sülze and a children's play group run by the German Red Cross in Sandbergsfeld were responsible for children in Eversen. The increasing number of children would have entailed an expansion of the Sülze facility; instead it was decided to build a new kindergarten in Eversen in the 1990s. The new kindergarten is in the middle of the village and has places for about 50 children, looked after by 2 child care workers and 2 nursery nurses. On 1 February 1995 the facility was opened.

=== Sewage works ===
Until the 1960s individual farms were responsible for their own waste disposal. As part of the expansion of the road network in the early 1960s, however, work began on a sewage system that enabled centralised waste disposal for the first time. In 1965 the municipalities of Eversen and Sülze agreed to establish a sewage farm, which went into operation in 1973. In the course of the years the neighbouring villages of Diesten, Huxahl, Offen, Altensalzkoth and Hassel were also added to the sewage system.

== People ==
- Henning Otte (1968 −, politician, MdB
- Gert G. von Harling (1945 −, hunting author
- Adolf Eichmann (19 March 1906 in Solingen - 1 June 1962 in Ramleh/Tel Aviv, Israel) lived from 1946 to 1950 in Altensalzkoth.

== Literature ==
- Gädcke, Horst (1994). Eversen. Ein altes Dorf im Celler Land, 1994. ISBN 3-930374-02-1
- Rathmann, Franz (1998). Dorfbuch Eversen. Ein Haus- und Lesebuch, 1998. ISBN 3-921744-09-1
