= Sink works =

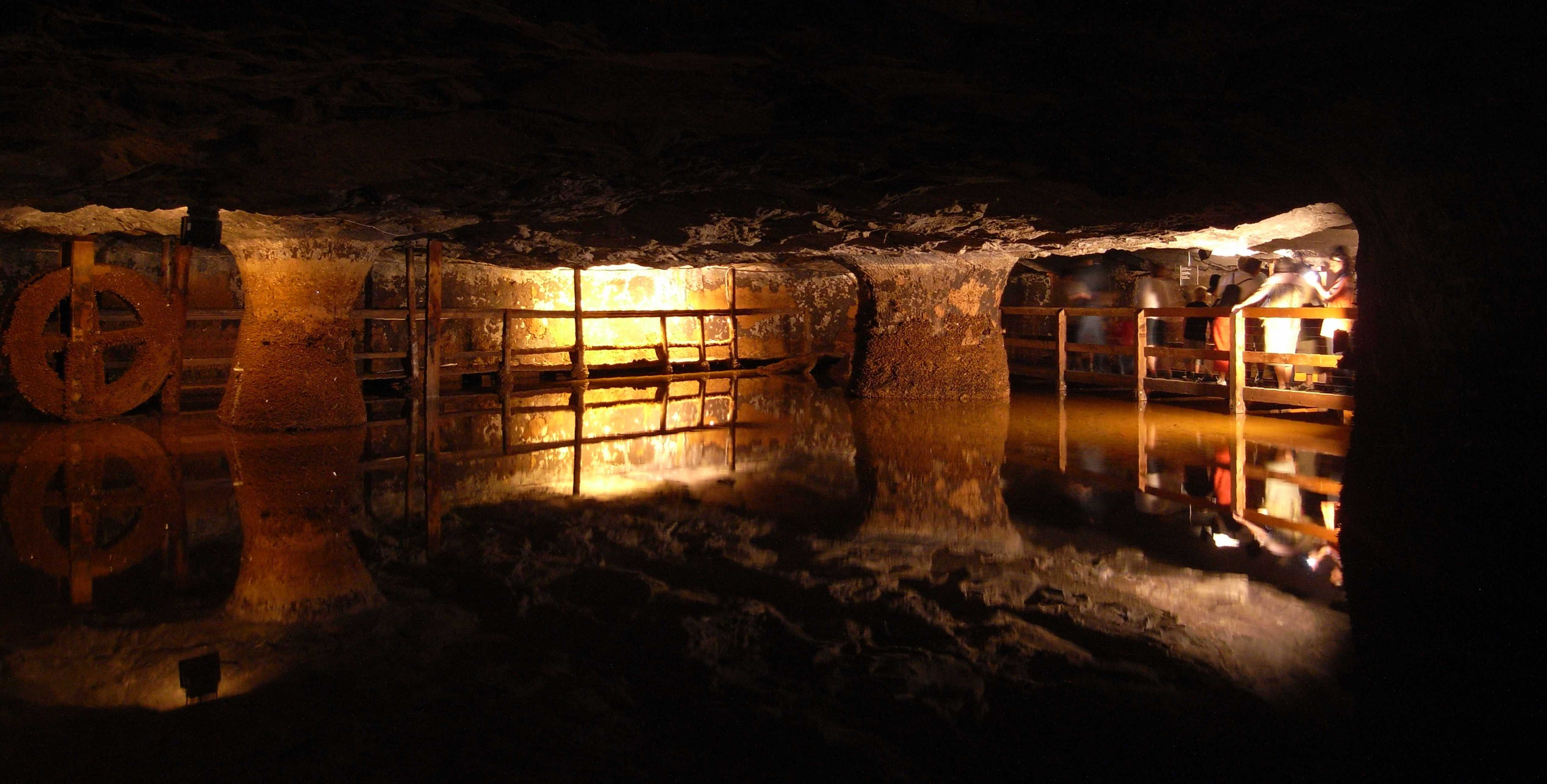
Sinkworks in the Bex salt mine, Switzerland

Sink works or sinkworks (from German Sinkwerke) is a method of salt mining from salt deposits in mountainous areas. It is similar to brine wells in that salt was extracted by dissolving it in water. Both approaches simulate natural brine springs. It is one of the earliest methods of salt extraction from salt domes.

A sinkwerk is a chamber in a salt mine filled with water to dissolve salt. The resulting brine is then pumped via brine pipelines to saltworks.

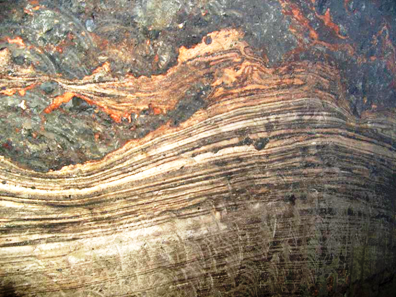
Haselgebirge of Berchtesgaden salt mines

This approach is commonly used when salt deposits are heavily contaminated (or, alternatively, when salt content in the deposit is low), so that mining of rock salt is not feasible. This method is common in most salt mines in Alps, where the saltrock-mudrock-tectonite known as Haselgebirge is widespread, with average halite content of 30-65%.

In industrial cases, a complex structure of underground chambers interconnected by tunnels is created.
