= Altensalzkoth =

- Ortsteil of Bergen
- Interactive map of Altensalzkoth
- Location within Germany Location within Lower Saxony
- Country: Germany
- State: Lower Saxony
- District: Celle
- Town: Bergen

Population
  - Total: 65
- Time zone: UTC+01:00 (CET)
  - Summer (DST): UTC+02:00 (CEST)

Altensalzkoth is a village in the Lower Saxon town of Bergen in north Germany. It belongs to the parish of Eversen in the district of Celle on the Lüneburg Heath. It lies 13 km north of Celle on the Landesstraße L 240 and currently has 65 inhabitants.

== History ==
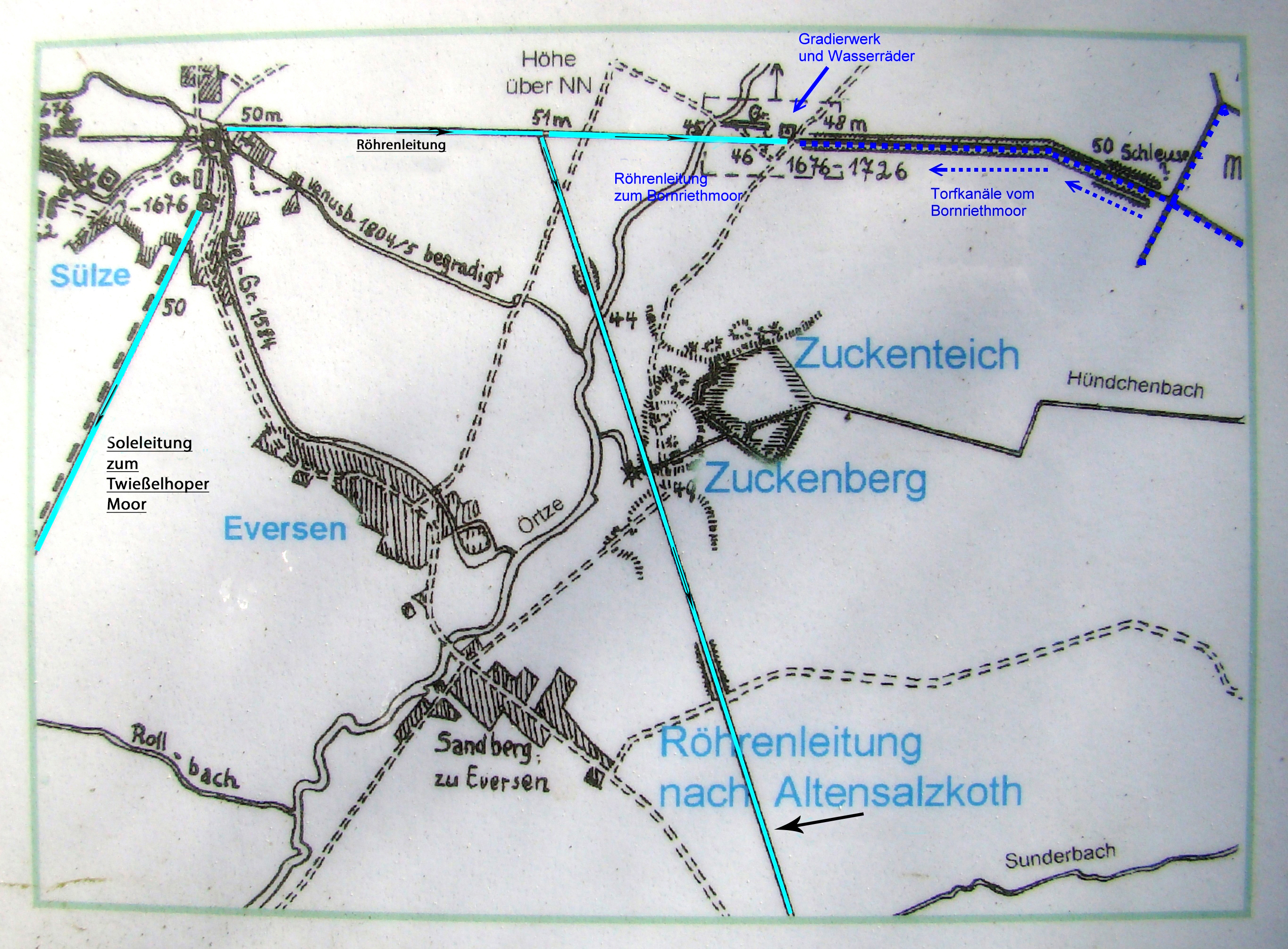
Brine pipes from Sülze to Altensalzkoth

The history of Altensalzkoth is closely bound to the saltworks in Sülze. When the moors in the vicinity of Sülze were exhausted, the boiling sites were moved initially to the Bornrieth Moor from 1673 to 1678. In 1719 the first discussions took place about moving the boiling sites again, because the Bornrieth Moor was also being exhausted. To achieve this the existing pipes to the moor from Lindhorst along the Örtze, were moved eastwards past Eversen to the Scheuer Bruch, south of Sülze, in the newly established village of Altensalzkoth. The survey staff charged with organising the move described this new site on their maps as Alte Salz kath, from which the present name of the village was later derived. In 1723 the new wooden pipes were finished. From 1725 brine was boiled in the salt huts of Altensalzkoth. Due to the increasing difficulty of transporting Sülze brine due to the long road, in 1793 the boiling sites started to move back to Sülze. A large number of those working in the saltworks left Altensalzkoth as a result. For those remaining behind a long battle began over the division of land in order to secure their livelihood from farming. Years later this was resolved by giving the settlers three acres (Morgen) of pasture and six acres of farmland each. Although this division of land enabled them to eke out a basic existence, the inhabitants also developed secondary occupations. Barrel-making gained an importance at this time. Many household objects were made from the wood of local trees and sold at the markets in Celle and Hermannsburg.

After the end of the Second World War the SS Führer Adolf Eichmann lived in Altensalzkoth under the name of Otto Henninger. Escaping from US Army custody, he reported to the parish office in Eversen on 30 March 1946 and took a job as a lumberjack in Altensalzkoth. When a short time later the firm who had employed him went bankrupt, he rented an empty farmhouse and lived in the years that followed mainly by doing odd jobs. In 1950 Eichmann fled to Argentina, where he was traced some years later by Mossad and taken to Israel. For his co-conspiracy in the Holocaust Eichmann was sentenced to death.

Until its incorporation into the parish of Eversen in 1929, Altensalzkoth was an independent parish. Since 1972 it has belonged to the borough of Bergen.

== People ==
- Adolf Eichmann (b 19 March 1906 in Solingen, d 1 June 1962 in Ramleh/Tel Aviv, Israel) lived in Altensalzkoth from 1946 to 1950.

== Sources ==
- Horst Gädcke: Eversen. Ein altes Dorf im Celler Land, 1994. ISBN 3-930374-02-1
- Franz Rathmann: Dorfbuch Eversen. Ein Haus- und Lesebuch, 1998. ISBN 3-921744-09-1
