= Jakob Haartman =

The Right Reverend Jakob Haartman
- Bishop of Turku
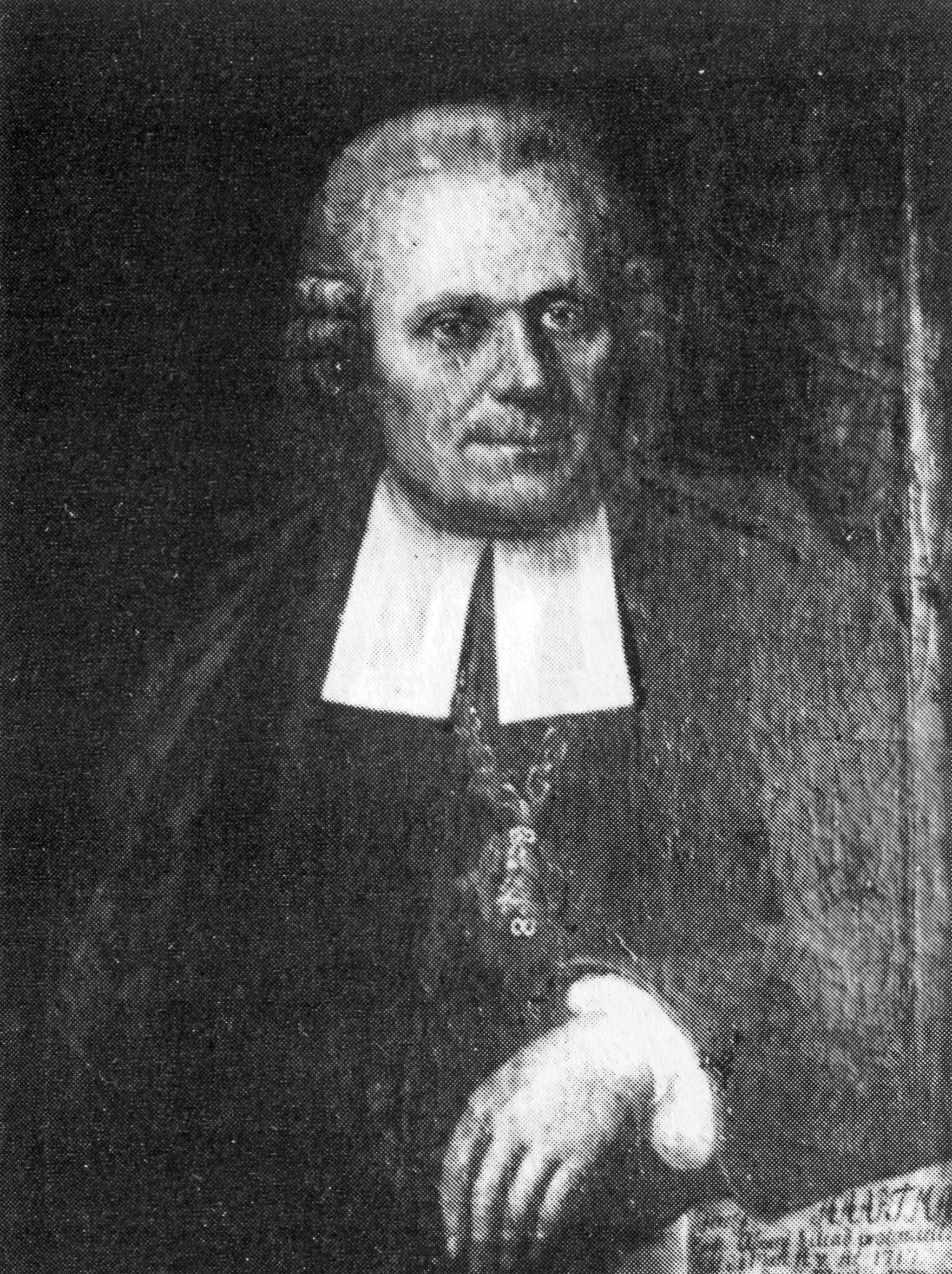
- Church: Church of Sweden
- Diocese: Turku
- Appointed: 13 August 1776
- In office: 1776–1788
- Predecessor: Carl Fredrik Mennander
- Successor: Jakob Gadolin

Orders
- Ordination: 1758
- Consecration: 1776 by Carl Fredrik Mennander

Personal details
- Born: 8 March 1717 Stockholm, Sweden
- Died: 6 March 1788 (aged 70) Turku, Finland
- Denomination: Lutheran
- Parents: Johan Jakobsson Haartman & Maria Kristoffersdotter Sundenius
- Spouse: Eleonora Elisabet De la Myle

Jakob Haartman (8 March 1717 – 6 March 1788) was the bishop of Turku in Finland from 1776 until his death in 1788.

== Biography ==
Haartman was born on 8 March 1717 in Stockholm, Sweden, the son of Finnish parents Johan Jakobsson Haartman, a priest, and Maria Kristoffersdotter Sundenius. He graduated from the Royal Academy of Turku in 1730 and from Uppsala University in 1733. He earned his master's degree from the Royal Academy of Turku in 1741. In 1742 he became an associate professor of Philosophy and a deputy librarian in 1750, a deputy secretary in 1755 and a professor of Philosophy and History in 1756. He was ordained a priest in 1758.

He was elected Bishop of Turku and Deputy Chancellor of the Royal Academy of Turku on 13 August 1776. He was chosen by Gustav III of Sweden to be the Godfather of Crown Prince Gustav Adolf at his baptism on 10 November 1778. Haartman was married to Eleonora Elisabet de la Myle (1726-1810). He died in Turku on 6 March 1788.

== See also ==
- List of bishops of Turku

Religious titles
Preceded by Carl Fredrik Mennander	Bishop of Turku; 1776 — 1788	Succeeded by Jakob Gadolin
