= Hassell =

Hassell can refer to:

- Hassell (surname)
- Hassell, North Carolina, United States
- Hassell Creek, a river in Tennessee, United States
- Hassell National Park, a national park in Australia
- Hassell (architecture firm), a global multidisciplinary design practice
- Hassell Bacchus, Trinidad and Tobago politician
