= Feuerschützenbostel =

Coordinates: 52°44′00″N 10°01′55″E

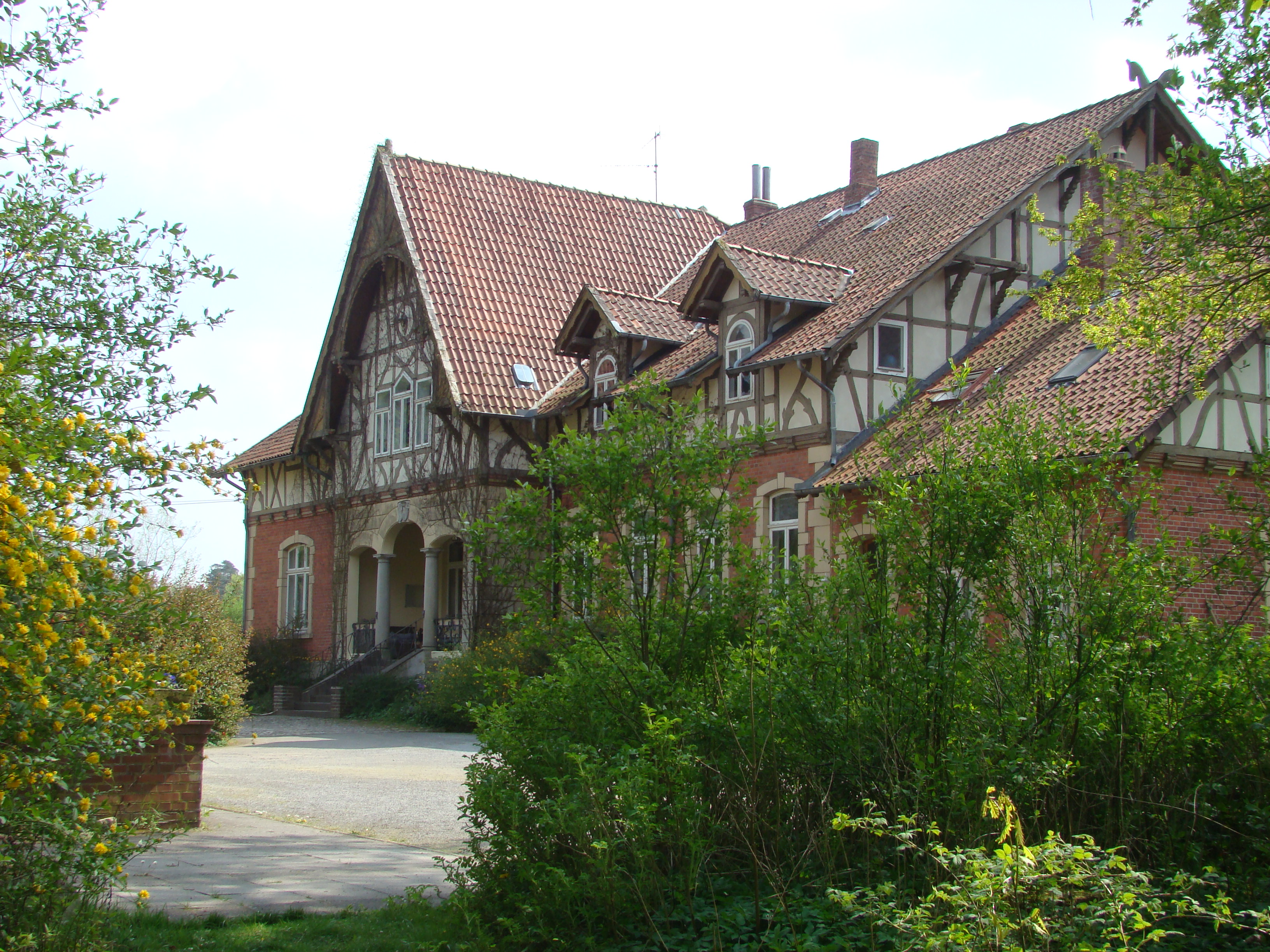
Manor house of the von Harling family

Feuerschützenbostel is a hamlet in the town of Bergen in North Germany that belongs to the parish of Eversen. It lies 2.5 km west of Eversen and currently has 23 inhabitants.

== Sources ==
- Franz Rathmann: Dorfbuch Eversen. Ein Haus- und Lesebuch, 1998. ISBN 3-921744-09-1
