= Salt well =

Technique used to mine salt

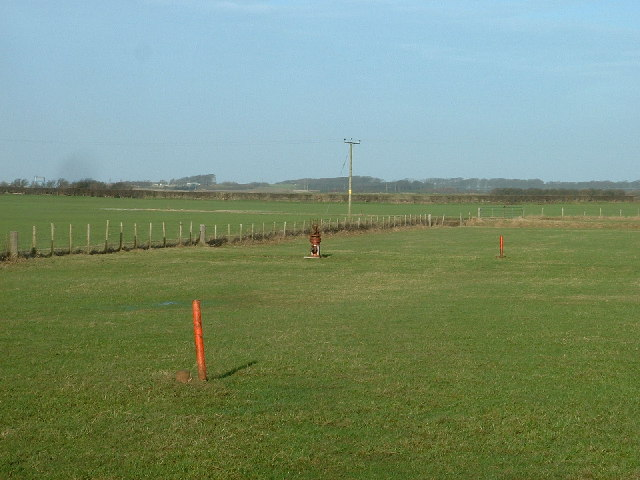
Brine Wells near Preesall, England

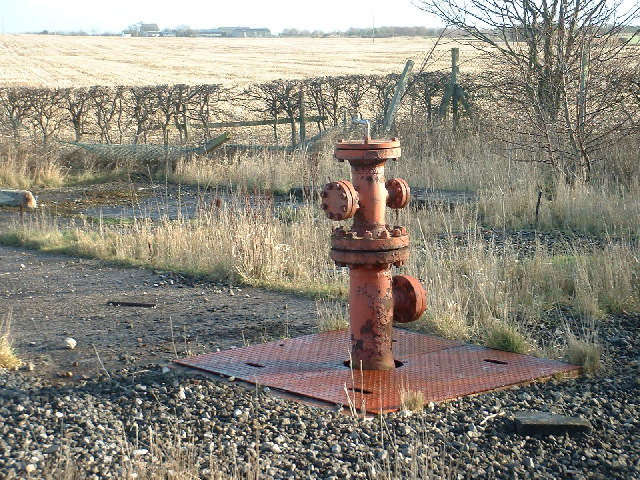
Brine wellhead near Preesall, England

A salt well (or brine well) is used to mine salt from caverns or deposits. Water is used as a solution to dissolve the salt or halite deposits so that they can be extracted by pipe to an evaporation process, which results in either a brine or a dry product for sale or local use. In the United States during the 19th century, salt wells were a significant source of income for operators and the government. Locating underground salt deposits was usually based on locations of existing salt springs.

In mountainous areas, a similar technique called sink works (from German sinkwerk) is used.

== History ==
Brine wells and salt solution mining have been used in China for more than 2000 years. The first recorded salt well in China was dug in the Sichuan province around 2,250 years ago. This was the first time that ancient water well technology was applied successfully for the exploitation of salt, and marked the beginning of Sichuan's salt drilling industry. Shaft wells were sunk as early as 220 BC in Sichuan and Yunnan Provinces. By 1035 AD, in the Sichuan area, percussion drilling was used to recover deep brines, a technique that would not be used in the West for another 600 to 800 years. European travelers to China between 1400 and 1700 AD reported salt and natural gas production from dense networks of brine wells. Archaeological evidence of Song dynasty salt drilling tools used are kept and displayed in the Zigong Salt Industry Museum. Many wells were over 450m deep and at least one well was more than 1000 meters deep. Marco Polo reported an annual production in a single province of more than 30,000 tonnes of brine during his time there. According to Salt: A World History, a Qing dynasty well, also in Zigong, "continued down to 3,300 feet (1,000 m) making it at the time the deepest drilled well in the world."
