= Hassel (Bergen) =

- Ortsteil of Bergen
- Interactive map of Hassel
- Location within Germany Location within Lower Saxony
- Coordinates: 52°44′06″N 09°59′22″E
- Country: Germany
- State: Lower Saxony
- District: Celle
- Town: Bergen

Area
  - Total: 14.40 km^{2} (5.56 sq mi)

Population (2019)
  - Total: 191
  - Density: 13.3/km^{2} (34.4/sq mi)
- Time zone: UTC+01:00 (CET)
  - Summer (DST): UTC+02:00 (CEST)
- Postal codes: 29303
- Dialling codes: 05054

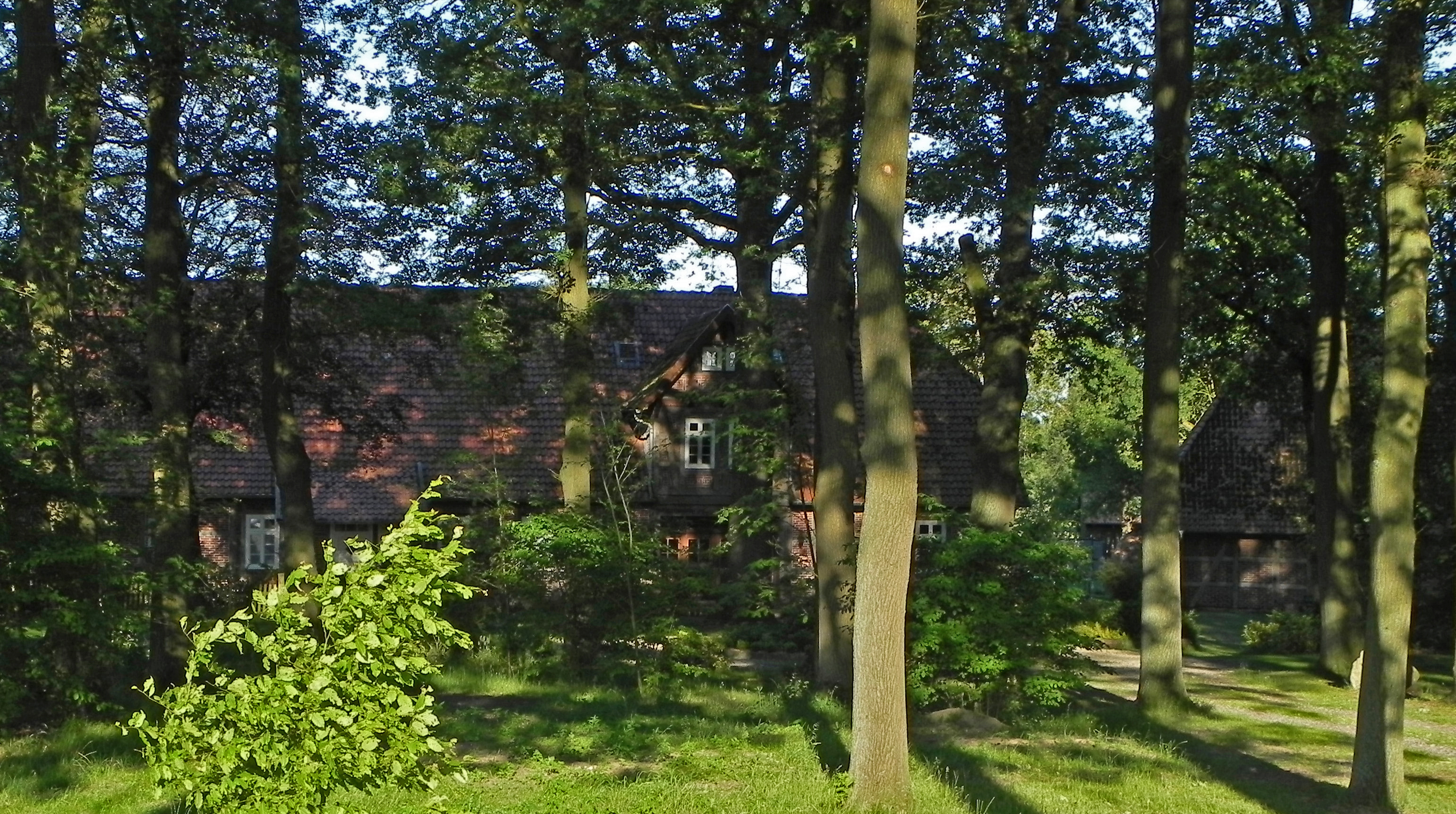
A Hassel farmstead beneath the ancient oaks

Hassel (German pronunciation: [ˈhasl̩]) is a village administered by the Lower Saxon town of Bergen in the northern part of Celle district on the Lüneburg Heath in North Germany. Formerly an independent municipality, it is part of the town Bergen since 1973.

== Geography ==
It lies about 11 kilometres (6.8 mi) south of Bergen on the B 3 federal road in the glacial valley of the River Örtze. It has an area of 1,440 hectares (3,600 acres) and a population of 191 inhabitants (2019). It is administratively responsible for the neighbouring hamlets of Achterberg, Grünewald and Wallerholz.

== Population ==
=== Religion ===
Until 1971 Hassel belonged to the parish of Winsen. Then, at the request of the parishioners, they were transferred to the parish of St. Fabian and St. Sebastian in Sülze. The majority of Hassel's population are Protestant; Roman Catholic villagers come under the parish of Bergen.

=== Language ===
Hassel lies within the Low German language region and Northern Low Saxon dialect group. Since the end of the Second World War, High German (i.e. standard German) has become widespread and largely superseded Low German. However, amongst the older villagers Low German is still used colloquially.

== History ==
It is not clear when the village of Hassel first came into being, but what is certain is that the first settlements appeared between Krähenberg and Ostermoor on the slopes of the glacial valley of the Örtze.

Hassel was first mentioned in the records in 1298. In a list of cattle holdings in 1438 three farms are documented; in 1589 five farmsteads are named in a housebook. These three farms and two individual houses (Kötnerhöfen) continued to exist over the following centuries and it was not until the 19th century that further farms appeared.

The 19th century was characterised by extensive agricultural reforms. Fundamental to subsequent reforms was the general division (Generalteilung) of land at the beginning of the 19th century, whereby the villages were given fixed boundaries and every piece of land was allocated to a municipality (Gemeinde). The amount of land around the individual villages which was allocated to them was based on the grazing rights they had held in the past.

This was followed during the period 1838 to 1858 by the division of common land (Gemeinheitsteilungen). Common land, i.e. those areas which had hitherto been shared by the community, was now transferred to the individual farms as freehold property based on their existing rights to the common land.

On the basis of the Kingdom of Hanover's 1833 redemption law the obligations on farms under the manorial system were repealed. Farms to which the so-called manorial rights applied had been hitherto obliged to give numerous services and make frequent payments to the manor. That was now repealed on payment of 25 times the annual dues and the land was then granted under freehold into the farmers' ownership.

One consequence of the redemption law was that the land holdings could now be freely sold. That created the right conditions for the establishment of new farmsteads. As a result, in the second half of the 19th century, a new village appeared on the Achterberg.

== Politics and administration ==
Since the 14th century Winsen was recorded as having a vogtei's office, the lowest level of administration and justice, which was presided over by a ducal vogt. Matters of importance that only affected Hassel were discussed and decided by the Realgemeinde, i.e. the farm owners who had common land rights. The political reforms of the 19th century brought about a fundamental change from which the political municipality of Sülze arose. Participation in the resolution of village affairs was no longer dependent on ownership of property or land; instead every male villager over 25 had the right to vote.

Since the merging of local councils as part of the Lower Saxon administrative reforms of 1971, Hassel has been part of the town of Bergen. Hassel is represented by a local council (Ortsrat) and a mayor (Ortsbürgermeister). The council is empowered, inter alia, to make decisions about public services in the village, is responsible for maintaining the appearance of the village and for overseeing its clubs and societies, and has to be consulted by the town of Bergen on all important matters affecting the village. It consists of five elected representatives who, together with the mayor, sit on the Bergen town council. The village council elects its own mayor. The current incumbent is Helmut Ebel.

== Literature ==
- Schützenverein Hassel (Hrsg.) - 75 Jahre Schützenverein Hassel, 1924–1999
