= Hassell Creek =

Stream in Hickman County, Tennessee, U.S.

Coordinates: 35.809789°N 87.290844°W

Hassell Creek is a stream in Hickman County, Tennessee, in the United States. It is a tributary to Lick Creek.

Sources differ on the matter of for whom Hassell Creek was named. It may have been named for Zabulon Hassell, a pioneer who settled at the creek after 1806, or for "Black Jack" Hassell, a local moonshiner and politician.

== See also ==
- List of rivers of Tennessee
