= Kohlenbach =

Coordinates: 52°43′55.81″N 10°07′07.15″E

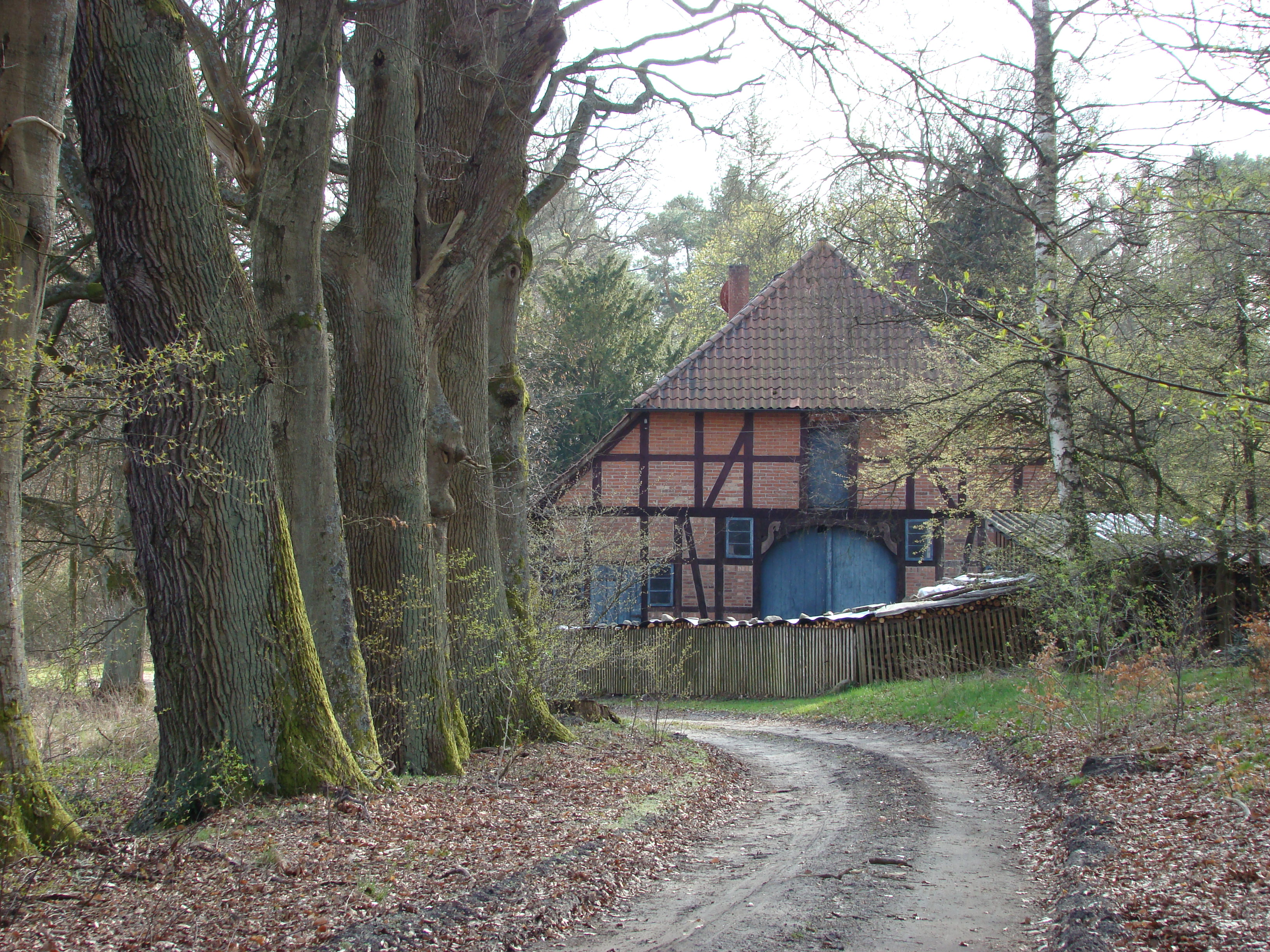
Kohlenbach on the E1 European long distance path

Kohlenbach is a village in the parish of Eversen which belongs to the town of Bergen on the Lüneburg Heath in Celle district in the north German state of Lower Saxony.

== History ==
Kohlenbach is a farmstead on the edge of the municipality of Eversen in a wood called the Garßener Holz. The small stream of Kohlenbach flows immediately past it and gives the hamlet its name. Lying on the Old Celle Military Road (Alten Celler Heerstraße) that runs past Kohlenbach, coming from Hanover and Celle and heading towards Lüneburg, it served originally as an inn until the end of the 18th century. This route lost its importance as a trading route as result of new lines of communication and the inn business had to be folded. Since that time Kohlenbach has been the residence of the district forester (Revierförster) and part of the Royal Forestry Division of Miele (Königliche Oberförsterei Miele). It has been part of the parish of Eversen since 1929.

Today the E1 European long distance path runs immediately past the farmstead.

== Sources ==
- Gädcke, Horst (1994). Eversen. Ein altes Dorf im Celler Land, 1994, ISBN 3-930374-02-1.
- Rathmann, Franz (1998). Dorfbuch Eversen. Ein Haus- und Lesebuch, 1998, ISBN 3-921744-09-1.
