= Lake Hassel =

Lake in the state of Minnesota, United States

- Location within Minnesota
- Location: Swift County, Minnesota
- Coordinates: 45°23′25″N 95°34′10″W
- Type: Lake

Lake Hassel is a lake in Swift County, in the U.S. state of Minnesota.

Hassel is a name derived from Norwegian, meaning "hazel".

== See also ==
- List of lakes in Minnesota
