= Bryan Hassel =

American education expert

Bryan C. Hassel is an expert on education issues, co-president of Public Impact a national education policy and management consulting firm based in Chapel Hill, North Carolina, and co-founder of the national Opportunity Culture initiative with Emily Ayscue Hassel. Hassel received his doctorate in public policy from Harvard University and his masters in politics from Oxford University, which he attended as a Rhodes Scholar. He earned his B.A. at the University of North Carolina at Chapel Hill, which he attended as a Morehead Scholar.

== Major work ==
Dr. Hassel co-leads strategy and national outreach for the Opportunity Culture initiative, which redesigns schools to reach more students with excellent teaching teams, boost student learning growth and pay educators more, funded within schools’ regular budgets. The initiative currently serves schools in 17 states and is releasing a low-cost school redesign portal with design tools, educator professional certificates in design, and school certification based on factors correlated with student learning growth over the last decade.

Opportunity Culture schools are primarily public district schools, with limited numbers of public charter schools participating.

In addition, Dr. Hassel has written extensively on charter school excellence and co-designed early national charter authorizing standards, encouraging growth of the best networks and reduction of ineffective schools.

He has written and spoken extensively on these topics, in addition to school finance, school turnarounds, education talent, and more.

=== Books ===
- Hassel, Bryan C. The Charter School Challenge: Avoiding the Pitfalls, Fulfilling the Promise. Washington, D.C.: Brookings Institution Press, 1999.
- Peterson, Paul E., and Bryan C. Hassel. Learning from School Choice. Washington, D.C.: Brookings Institution Press, 1998.
- Hassel, Bryan C., and Emily Ayscue Hassel. Picky Parent Guide : Choose Your Child's School with Confidence: The Elementary Years, (K-6). Ross, CA: Armchair Press, 2004.
