= Henrik Hassel =

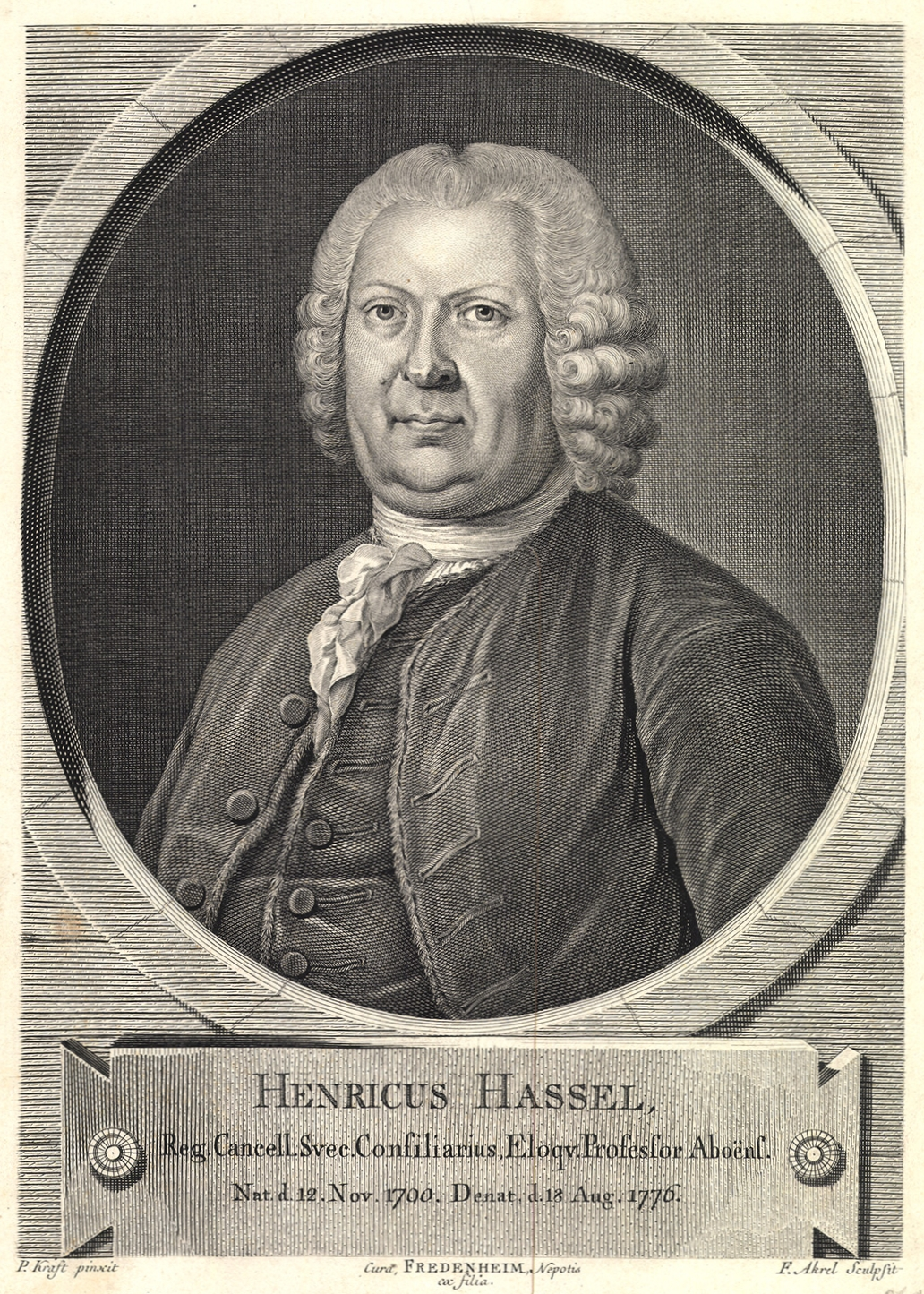

Henrik Hassel (12 November 1700 – 18 August 1776) was a Finnish professor at the Royal Academy of Turku. He served as a professor of eloquence in Latin (rhetoric) serving for 48 years and held the position of chancellor at the end of his career. He has been considered an important force in the introduction of humanism and new enlightenment ideas in Finland. He lived his life in what was then Sweden.

== Life and work ==
Hassel was born in Jomala on Åland where his namesake father was a chaplain. Around 1714, during the period called the "Great Hate", or Russian occupation of Finland, the family moved to Strängnäs, Sweden where Hassel studied. He then went to Uppsala University and in 1726 to the Royal Academy of Turku. Two years later he became a professor of eloquence in Latin. He became a chancellor in 1773. This was a period when professors did not publish independently but only as a supervisor and most of his thoughts were published in Latin through his students' dissertations. He contributed ideas in history, politics, religion, philology, and drew extensively from English philosophy including the ideas of Francis Bacon and John Locke. In 1732 he wrote De fabulis philosophorum (On the Philosophers' Tales) where he criticized René Descartes and Gottfried Wilhelm Leibniz. He was also critical of Wolff. Hassel saw all knowledge as being obtained via sensory means and that knowledge needed to be of application to human life. He noted that divine reason was not in reach and that absolute knowledge was not possible. In his De immunitate religionis a coactione (On freedom from religious coercion) he argued that parents and authorities should not force the adoption of religion. In 1745 he claimed that science could only be done in Latin but three years later, a treatise called De linguis eruditis (On the language of the learned) was published by a student in which he now noted that Latin was needed earlier to subdue barbarism and that it had become an obstacle to science.

He married Catharina Meurman in 1729 and secondly to Christina Margaretha Paléen in 1762.
