= Diesten =

- Ortsteil of Bergen
- Interactive map of Diesten
- Location within Germany Location within Lower Saxony
- Coordinates: 52°46′56″N 10°02′17″E
- Country: Germany
- State: Lower Saxony
- District: Celle
- Town: Bergen

Population (2019)
  - Total: 264
- Time zone: UTC+01:00 (CET)
  - Summer (DST): UTC+02:00 (CEST)
- Postal codes: 29303

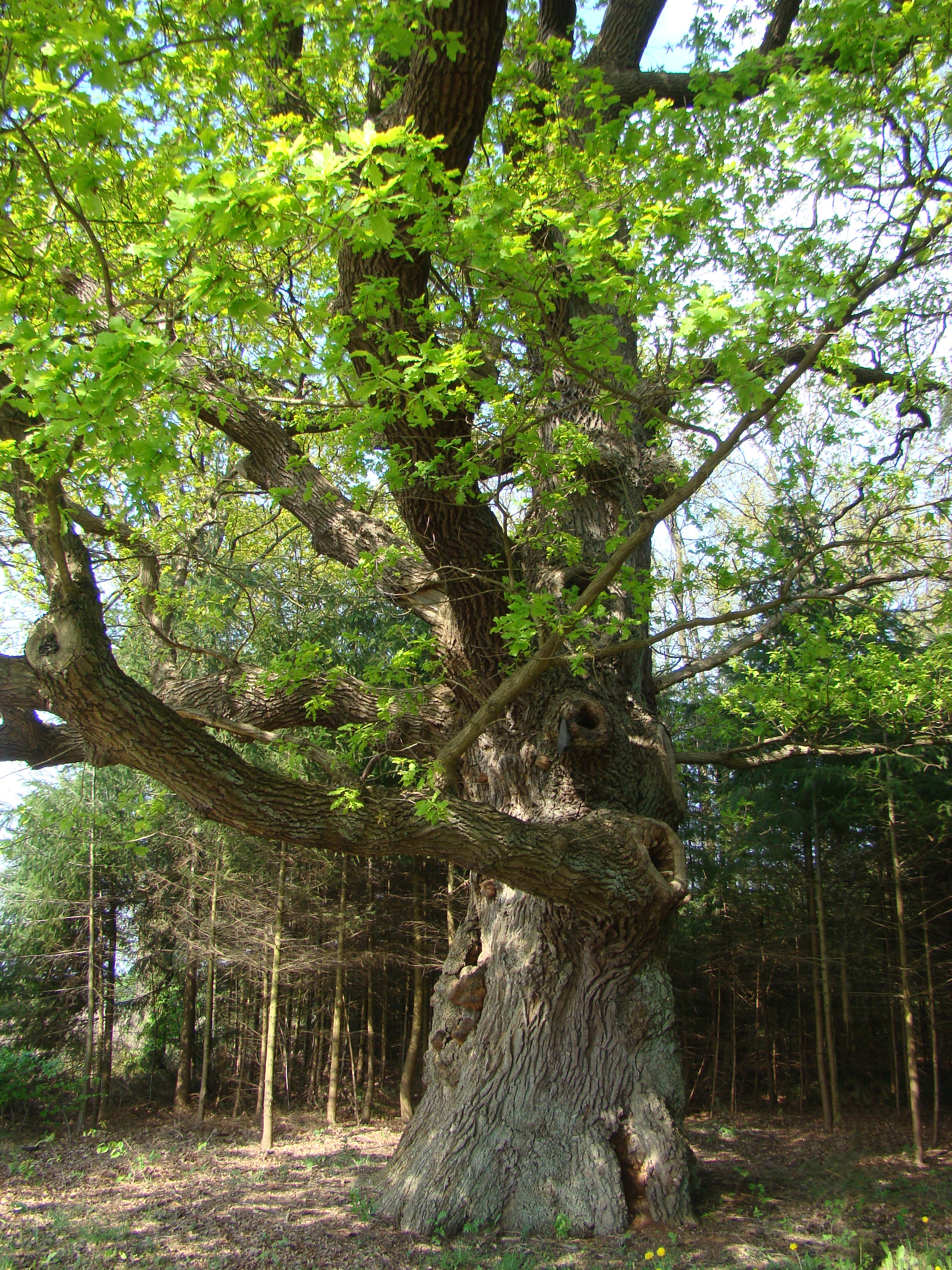
700-year-old oak near Lindhorst 52°46′30.55″N 10°03′33.46″E

Diesten (German pronunciation: [ˈdiːstn̩]) is a village subordinated to the Lower Saxon town of Bergen in the northern part of Celle district on the Lüneburg Heath in northern Germany. It lies 20 km north of Celle on Kreisstraße K 240 and has 264 inhabitants.

== History ==
Diesten was first mentioned in the records in 1235 under the name Dedesten. It has always had a rural character and, even today, has retained its original village layout. The hamlets of Huxahl, 1 km north of Diesten, and Lindhorst 2 km to the west, are administratively part of Diesten. In Lindhorst there is an old oak, protected by law, that was mentioned in a document as long ago as the 15th century. Based on that it is at least 700 years old.

== Politics ==
Following the Lower Saxony district and administrative reform of 1973, the Diesten has been part of the borough of Bergen. It is represented by a parish council (Ortsrat) and the chairman (Ortsbürgermeister). The council is empowered, inter alia, to make decisions about public services in the village, is responsible for maintaining the appearance of the village and for overseeing its clubs and societies, and has to be consulted by the town of Bergen on all important matters affecting the village. It consists of five elected representatives who, together with the chair, sit on the Bergen town council. The parish council elects its own mayor. The current incumbent is Reinhard Blonn.

== Literature ==
- Freiwillige Feuerwehr Diesten 1935-1985, 50th anniversary of the Diesten Volunteer Fire Service
