= Sülze (Bergen) =

- Ortsteil of Bergen
- Coat of arms
- Interactive map of Sülze
- Location within Germany Location within Lower Saxony
- Coordinates: 52°46′07″N 10°02′10″E
- Country: Germany
- State: Lower Saxony
- District: Celle
- Town: Bergen

Population (2019)
  - Total: 1,607
- Time zone: UTC+01:00 (CET)
  - Summer (DST): UTC+02:00 (CEST)
- Postal codes: 29303
- Dialling codes: 05054

Sülze (German pronunciation: [ˈzʏltsə]) is a village in the local borough of Bergen located in the northern part of Celle district on the Lüneburg Heath in North Germany. The infamous Bergen-Belsen concentration camp was located not far from Sülze, one of several farming villages in the borough. The general Bergen area today is economically heavily dependent on the surrounding military bases and the Bergen-Hohne Training Area to the west, which is the largest military training area in Western Europe.

== Geography ==
Sülze lies on the edge of the Südheide Nature Park about 17 kilometres (11 mi) north of Celle on state road (Landesstraße) L 240 which runs from Celle to Hermannsburg. Sülze is responsible for the neighbouring hamlets of Waldhof and Twießelhop.

== Population ==
=== Expansion ===
The following table shows the expansion in Sülze's population. Note the significant jump in population size after the Second World War, mainly due to the influx of refugees.

Year	Population	Houses	Year	Population	Houses	Year	Population	Houses
1821	328		1939	859		1967	1508
1848	433		1950	1391		2000	1656

=== Language ===
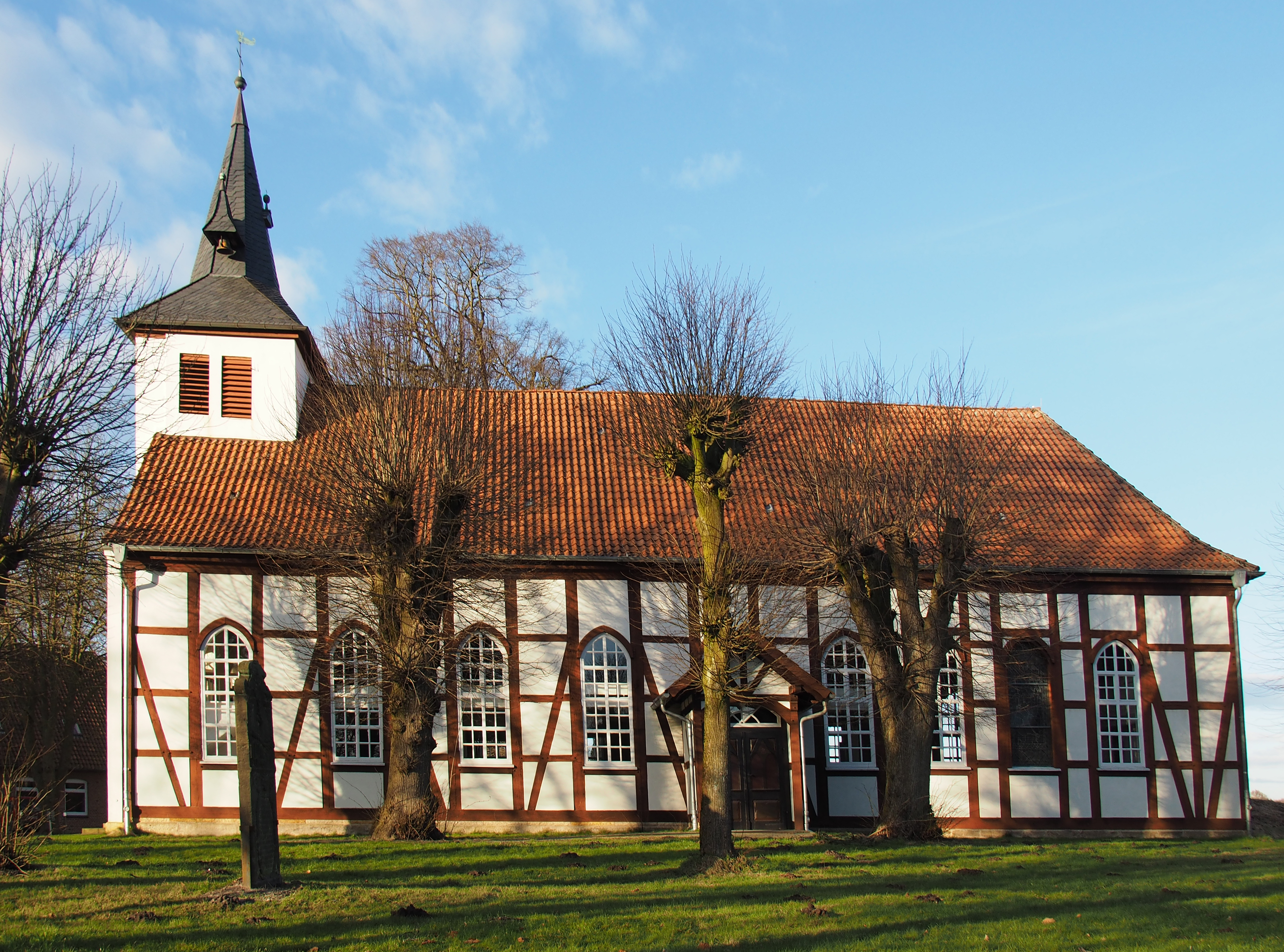
The Fabian and Sebastian Church in Sülze, built in 1754

Sülze belongs to the Low German language area and the Northern Low Saxon dialect group. Since the end of the Second World War, however, High German has largely superseded it. However, Low German continues to be used colloquially especially amongst the older members of the village.

=== Religion ===
The majority of Sülze's inhabitants belong to the Protestant faith. A priest in Bergen is responsible for Roman Catholics. In addition since the arrival of Kurdish families in the 1980s there is a fair minority of Yazidis in Sülze.

== History ==
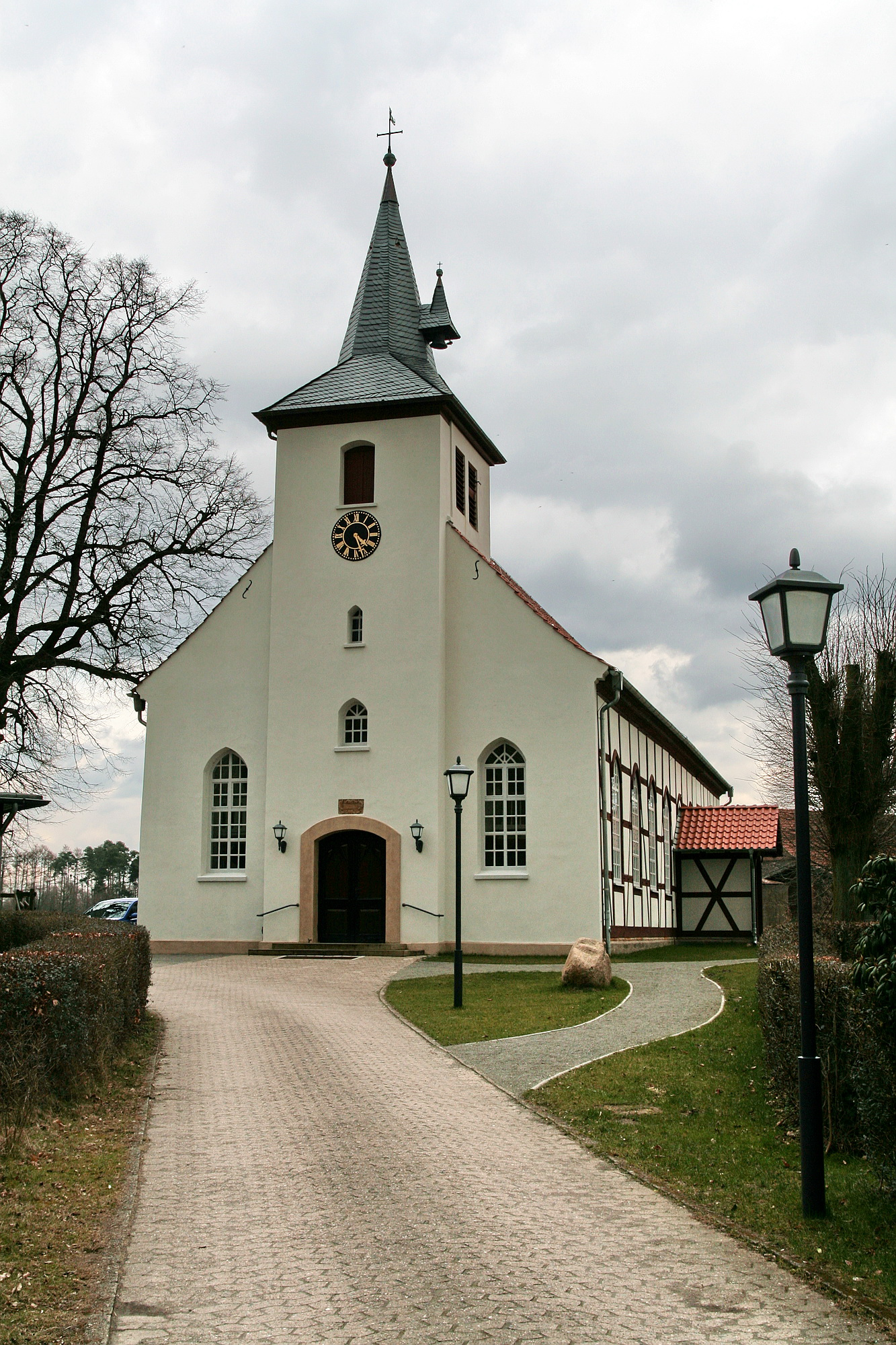
Front of the Fabian and Sebastian Church

The establishment of the village of Sülze cannot be precisely dated. However it can be assumed that Sülze originally emerged from an individual farmstead to become a horse-breeding estate or Sattelhof with state rights, and that the wider settlement appeared when the Sülze saltworks began operations in the 14th century. From 1390 the Sattelhof was owned by the Rabe family, although which of the Rabes lived here cannot be stated with certainty.

In 1354 the settlement was first mentioned in the records as Op dem Solte ("on the Salze"). In registers from the years 1381 and 1382 details of local private houses (Kötnerhöfe) were recorded, as well as the raising of a 'salt pan' tax (Pfannenzins). This is also the first time that the Sülze Saltworks is mentioned in the records.

In 1475 the first chapel was built in Sülze, which initially belonged to the town of Bergen. Following a donation in 1502 the village was given its own rectorate (Pfarrstelle) and Sülze was made an independent parish and centre of the parish of Sülze.

The extraction of salt by the saltworks was vital to the village for many centuries. The inhabitants secured their living by working as salt boilers (Sieder), salt drivers (Salzfahrer or Sölter) or craftsmen. The actual name of the village comes from these Salzfahrer, which in Low German is slurred to sult. This became the High German word Sülze.

The 19th century was marked by the closure of the Sülze saltworks in 1862 and by comprehensive agrarian reforms. Fundamental to the other reforms was a general division (Generalteilung) of land, whereby villages were given fixed boundaries and every piece of land was allocated to a community. The extent of the area given to individual villages was based on their historical grazing rights. Because Sülze was primarily dependent economically on the saltworks and agriculture only played a secondary role, it was only allocated just under 800 hectares (2,000 acres). This reform was followed by the Gemeinheitsteilung whereby the common land was transferred into the freehold of individual farms, depending on their existing rights to common land.

On the basis of the Kingdom of Hanover's 1833 redemption law the obligations on farms under the manorial system were repealed. Farms to which the so-called manorial rights applied had been hitherto obliged to give numerous services and make frequent payments to the manor. That was now repealed on payment of 25 times the annual dues and the land was then granted under freehold into the farmers' ownership.

== Politics and administration ==
Since the 14th century Bergen was recorded as having a vogtei's office, the lowest level of administration and justice, which was presided over by a ducal vogt. From the 15th century the administrative post in Sülze was subordinated to it and was responsible for the parish of Sülze. Matters of importance that only affected Sülze were discussed and decided by the Realgemeinde, i.e. the farm owners who had common land rights. The political reforms of the 19th century brought about a fundamental change from which the political municipality of Sülze arose. Participation in the resolution of village affairs was no longer dependent on ownership of property or land; instead every male villager over 25 had the right to vote.

Since the merging of local councils as part of the Lower Saxon administrative reforms of 1973, Sülze has been part of the town of Bergen. Sülze is represented by a local council (Ortsrat) and a mayor (Ortsbürgermeister). The council is empowered, inter alia, to make decisions about public services in the village, is responsible for maintaining the appearance of the village and for overseeing its clubs and societies, and has to be consulted by the town of Bergen on all important matters affecting the village. It consists of five elected representatives who, together with the mayor, sit on the Bergen town council. The village council elects its own mayor. The current incumbent is Peter Rabe (CDU).

== Economy and infrastructure ==
=== Transport ===
Sülze lies on state road 240 from Celle to Hermannsburg. Until 1975 Sülze station was linked to Bergen and, later when the line was extended, to Hermannsburg and Celle on a narrow gauge (Kleinbahn) railway. Buses on the Celle - Faßberg route operated by CeBus stop several times a day in Sülze and link the place to the surrounding villages.

== Personalities ==
- Georgette Dee (9 September 1958) − German singer and actress
- Hermann Ehlers (1 October 1904 in Berlin - 29 October 1954 in Oldenburg) − German politician

== Literature ==
- Horst Gädcke: Eversen. Ein altes Dorf im Celler Land, 1994. ISBN 3-930374-02-1
- Wilhelm Helms - Sülze. Beiträge zur Dorf-, Kirchenspiel- und Salinengeschichte, 2005
- August Theiss - Die Geschichte der Saline zu Sülze 1979
