= Rischmannshof Heath Museum =

Coordinates: 52°51′43.4844″N 9°35′1.12″E

Rischmannshof Heath Museum (Heidemuseum Rischmannshof)
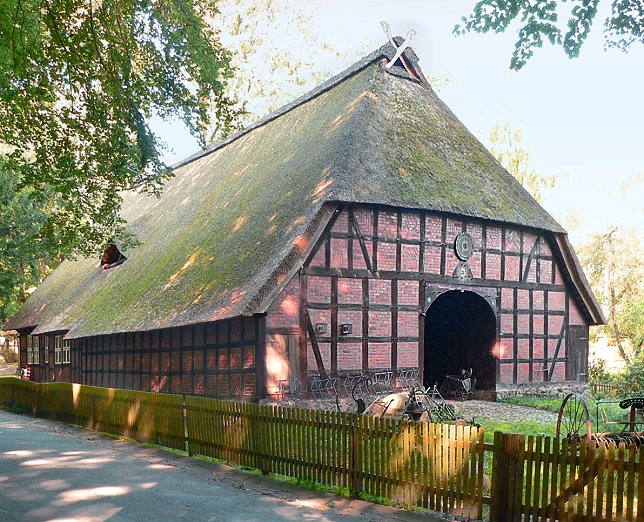
- Established: 1912
- Location: Walsrode
- Type: Open-air museum
- Director: Monika Seidel

The Rischmannshof Heath Museum (German: Heidemuseum Rischmannshof) is an open-air museum in Walsrode, Germany.

== History ==
Rischmannshof was opened in 1912 as one of the first open-air museums in Germany. The museum consists of a rural farmyard with outbuildings and other exhibits. The heart of the site is a thatched, timber-framed hall house (Fachhallenhaus) built as a two-post farmhouse dating to 1798. This originally stood in Hartem near Fallingbostel and was reconstructed in Walsrode. In addition the site has the house of a hireling (Heuerling or Häusling) originally from Fulde and about the same age, as well as a type of apiary, known locally as a Bienenzaun. A Treppenspeicher storage barn from Oberndorfmark dates back to 1669. Not until some time later was the site enhanced with a bakehouse from the year 1752 and a timber-framed barn with a workshop from 1842.

There is a branch of the museum in the old village school in Klein Eilstorf which itself dates back to 1900.

== Exhibitions ==
The main building was designed as a Low German house and its ground floor has the traditional division of living accommodation (Dönzen), an open kitchen (Flett) with a fireplace and a hall with livestock bays or stalls (Stallungen). The atmosphere is modelled on a typical heath farmhouse with appropriate furniture and implements. On the upper floor of the building is a Hans Brüggemann exhibition, depicting some of the history of the town of Walsrode and the Hermann Löns Room. In the Löns Room are original objects and furniture belonging to the poet and author, as well as first editions of his works, autographs and publications.

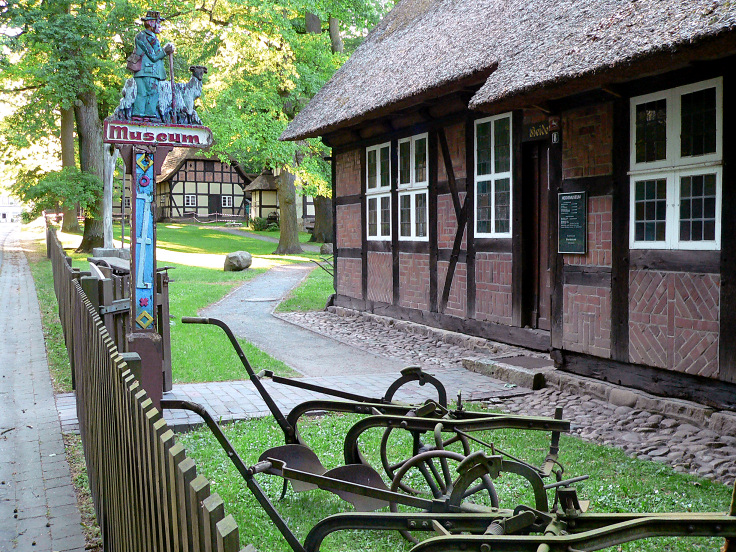
Museum entrance in the main building

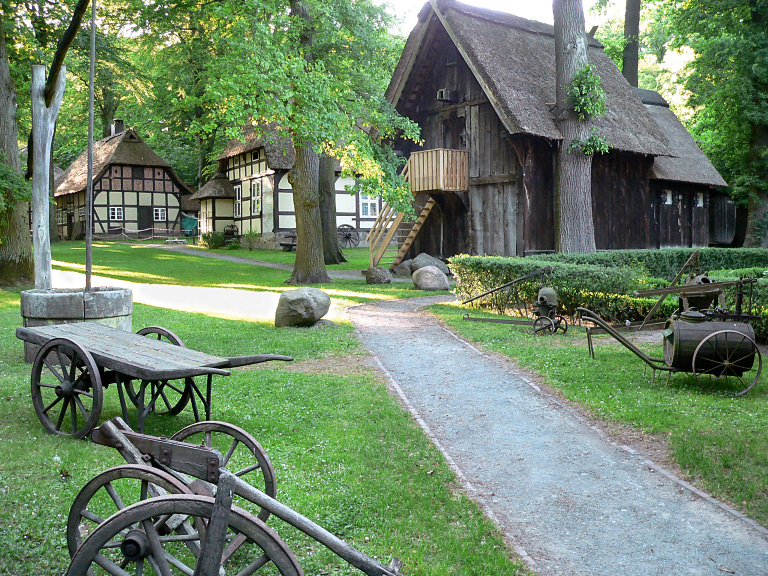
Outside area with the Treppenspeicher of 1669

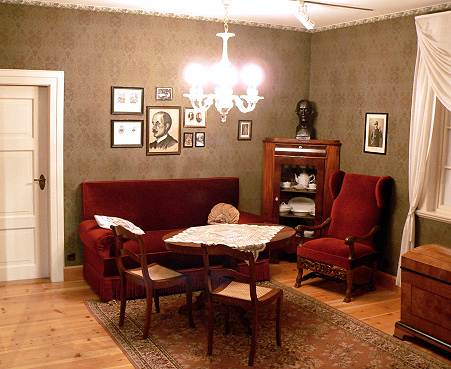
The Hermann Löns Room in the museum

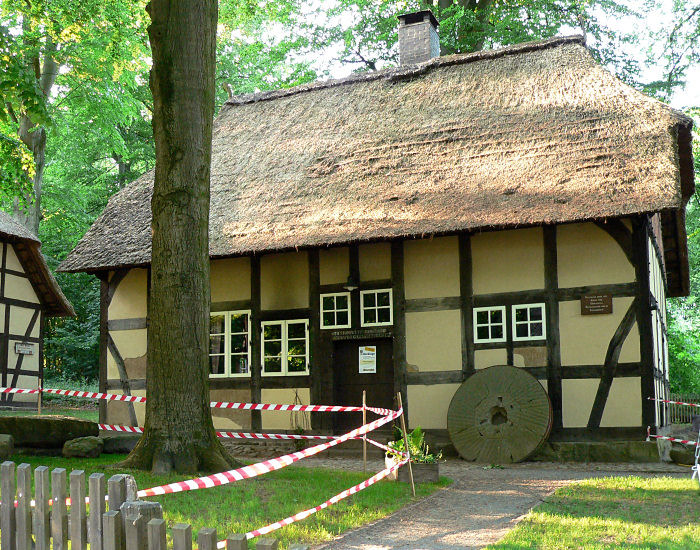
Historic buildings on the museum site

== Literature ==
- Gernot Erler, Horst Appuhn u. Heino Petersen: Heidehofensemble Rischmannshof. Das Heidemuseum in Walsrode als ein Heimatmuseum der Heide. Der Museumsführer. Bund der Freunde des Heidemuseums, Walsrode 1987
