= Wardböhmen =

- Ortsteil of Bergen
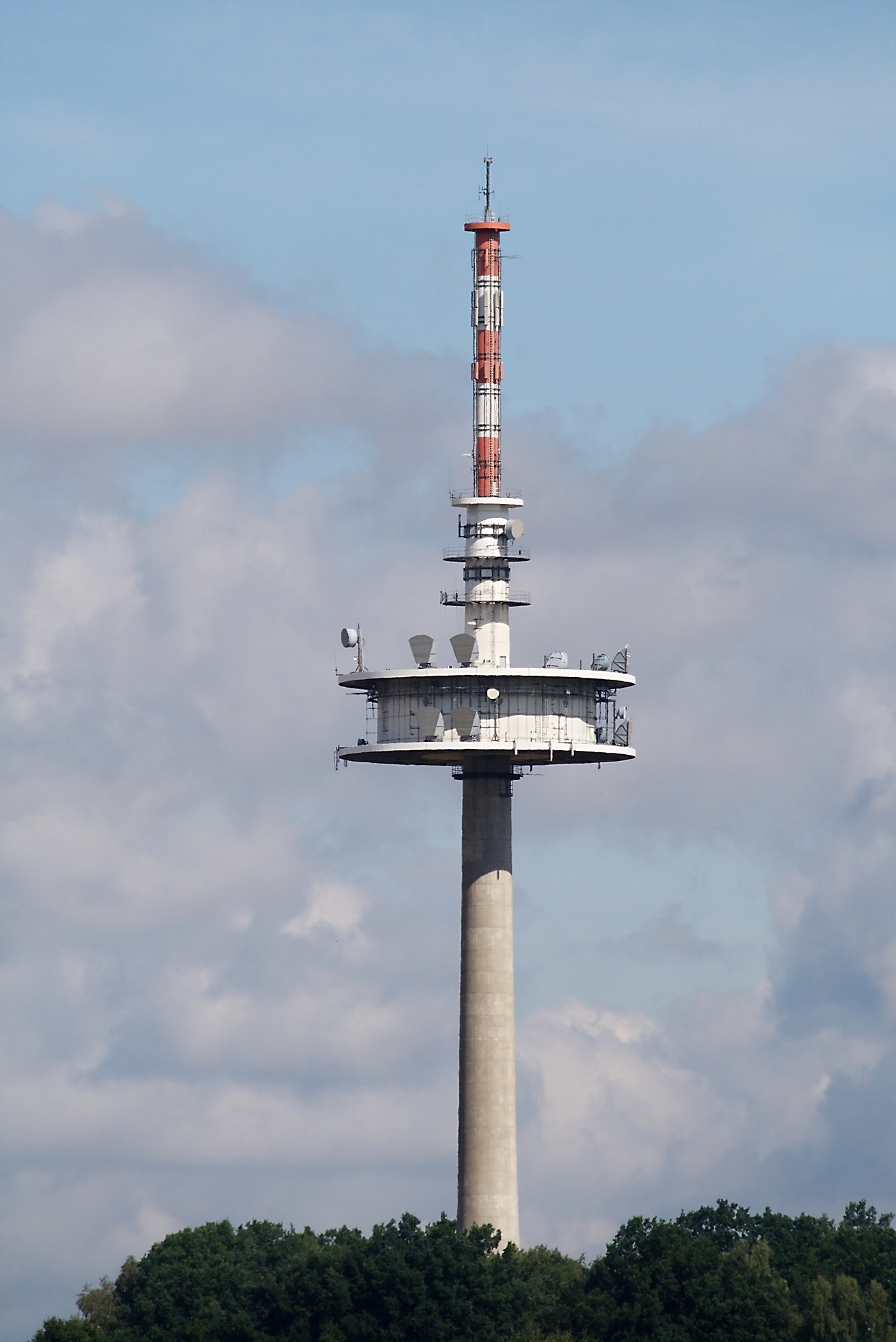
- Transmission tower in Wardböhmen (Bergen)
- Interactive map of Wardböhmen
- Location within Germany Location within Lower Saxony
- Coordinates: 52°50′59″N 09°54′52″E
- Country: Germany
- State: Lower Saxony
- District: Celle
- Town: Bergen
- Elevation: 82 m (269 ft)

Population (2019)
  - Total: 338
- Time zone: UTC+01:00 (CET)
  - Summer (DST): UTC+02:00 (CEST)
- Postal codes: 29303
- Dialling codes: 05051

Wardböhmen (German pronunciation: [vaʁtˈbøːmən]) is a village administered by the Lower Saxon town of Bergen in the northern part of Celle district on the Lüneburg Heath in North Germany. It lies about 6 kilometres (3.7 mi) north of Bergen on the B 3 federal road.

== History ==
Wardböhmen was first mentioned in the records in 1197 as Villa Werthebohmen. Its purview includes the villages of Hoope and Sehlhof. Since the district reforms of 1974 Wardböhmen has been part of the borough of Bergen. Its current chair is Anna Cornils.

== Emblem ==
On a yellow shield, a blue triangle below with slightly curved edges. Above right a green windmill, above left a green barn (a Treppenspeicher), in the centre a silver transmission tower.

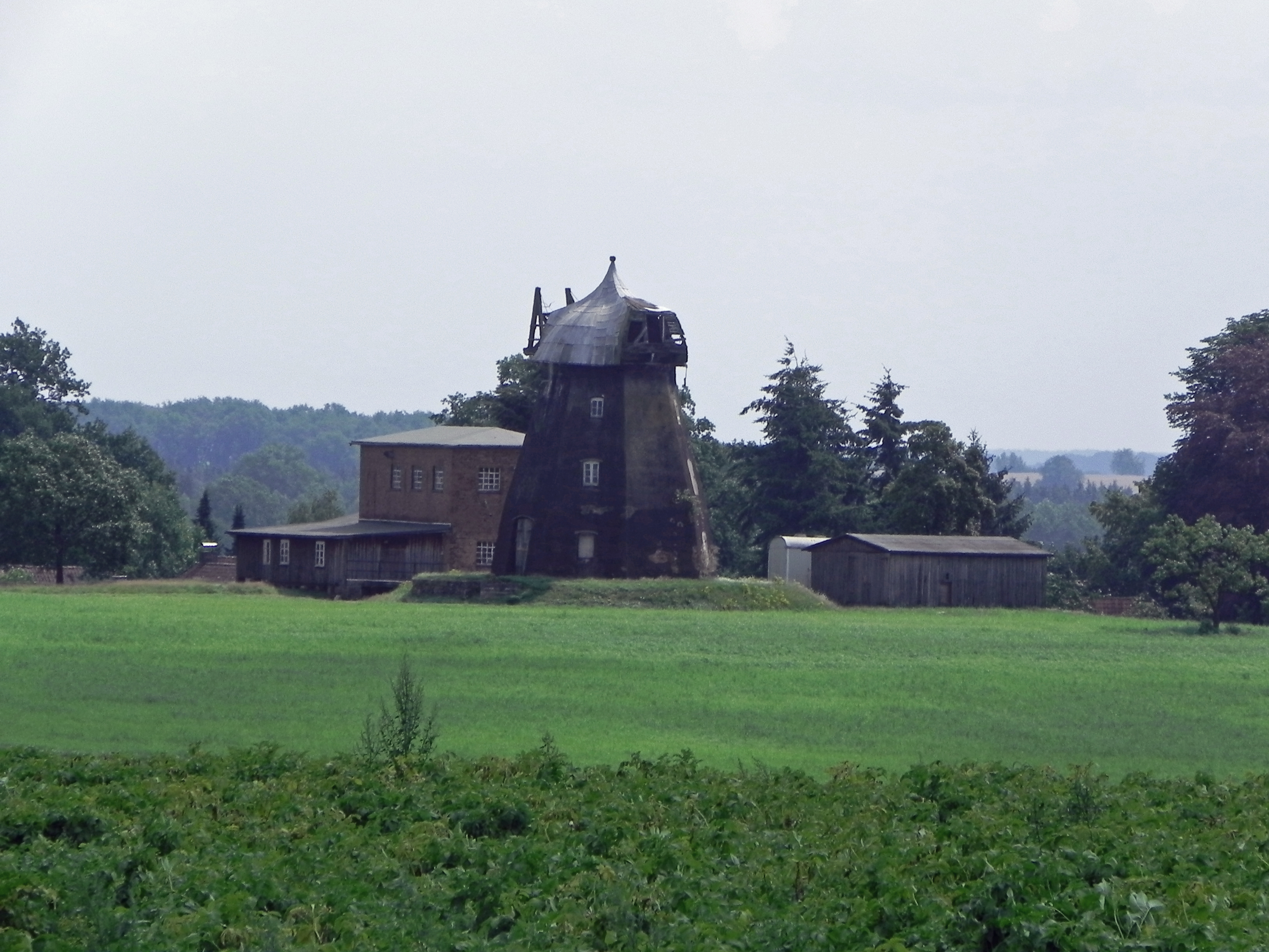
The old windmill dating to 1877/78

== Places of interest ==
- The mill dating back to 1877/78 is a listed building. It was worked until 1975, from 1950 without sails.
- The transmission tower (Funkübertragungsstelle Bergen 1) replaced the old tower (built in 1952, demolished in 1996) in 1986

== Literature ==
- Hermann v.d. Kammer: Geschichte der Ortschaft Wardböhmen mit den Ortsteilen Hoope und Sehlhof. Bergen 1997
