= Nindorf (Bergen) =

- Ortsteil of Bergen
- Interactive map of Nindorf
- Location within Germany Location within Lower Saxony
- Coordinates: 52°50′33″N 09°58′29″E
- Country: Germany
- State: Lower Saxony
- District: Celle
- Town: Bergen
- Elevation: 76 m (249 ft)

Population (2019)
  - Total: 215
- Time zone: UTC+01:00 (CET)
  - Summer (DST): UTC+02:00 (CEST)
- Postal codes: 29303
- Dialling codes: 05051

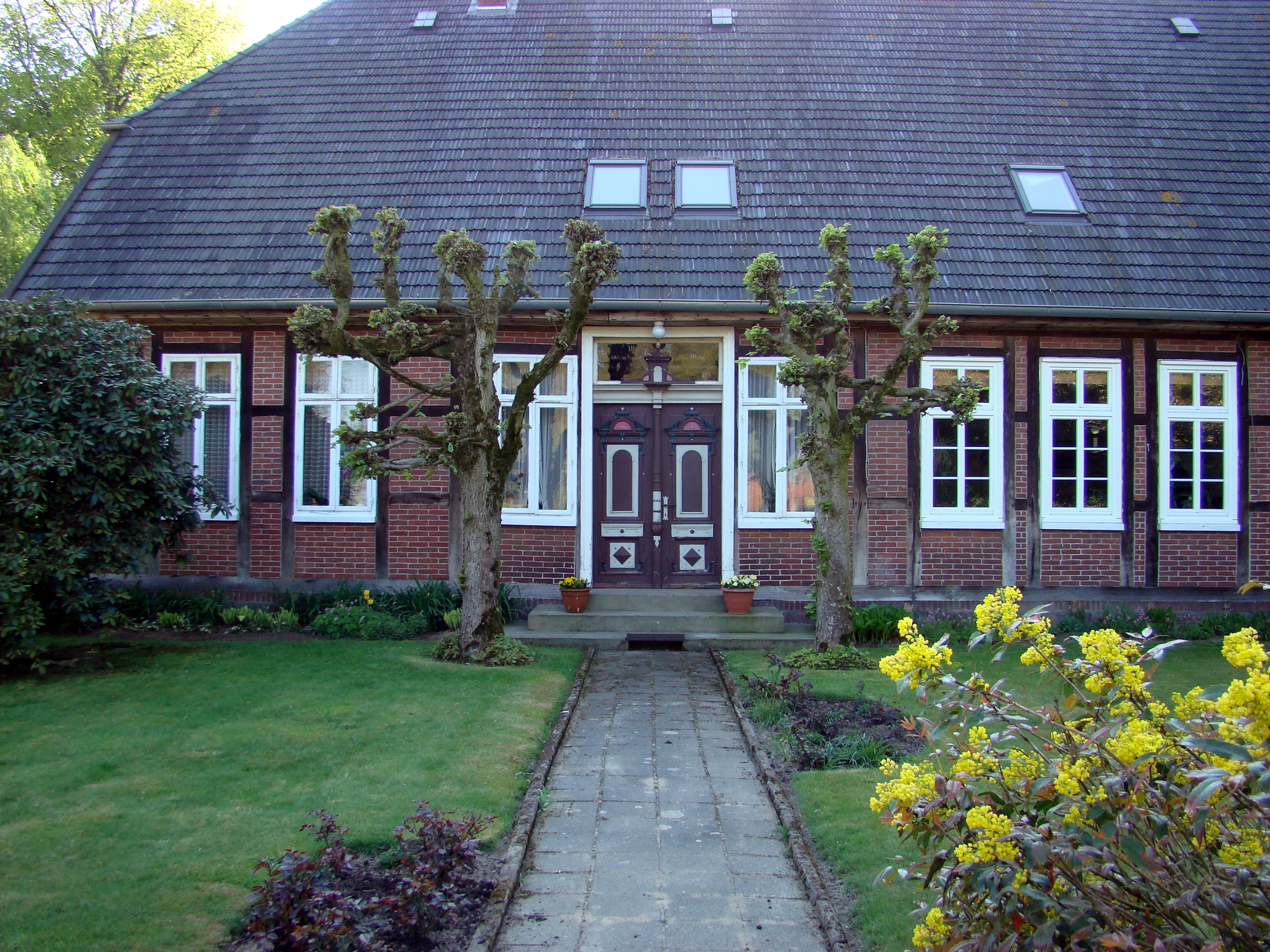
Entrance to the living quarters of a farmhouse

Nindorf is a village administered by the Lower Saxon town of Bergen in the northern part of Celle district on the Lüneburg Heath in North Germany. It lies about 4 kilometres (2.5 mi) northwest of Bergen on the B 3 federal road and has 215 inhabitants (2019).

== History ==
Nindorf was originally mentioned in 1197 under the name of villa Nendorpe. It is also responsible for Widdernhausen. The village lies on the K 12 district road (Kreisstraße), that runs from Bergen to Wietzendorf. Today it consists of a mixture of original farmsteads, some with old Treppenspeicher barns, but also modern farmhouses.

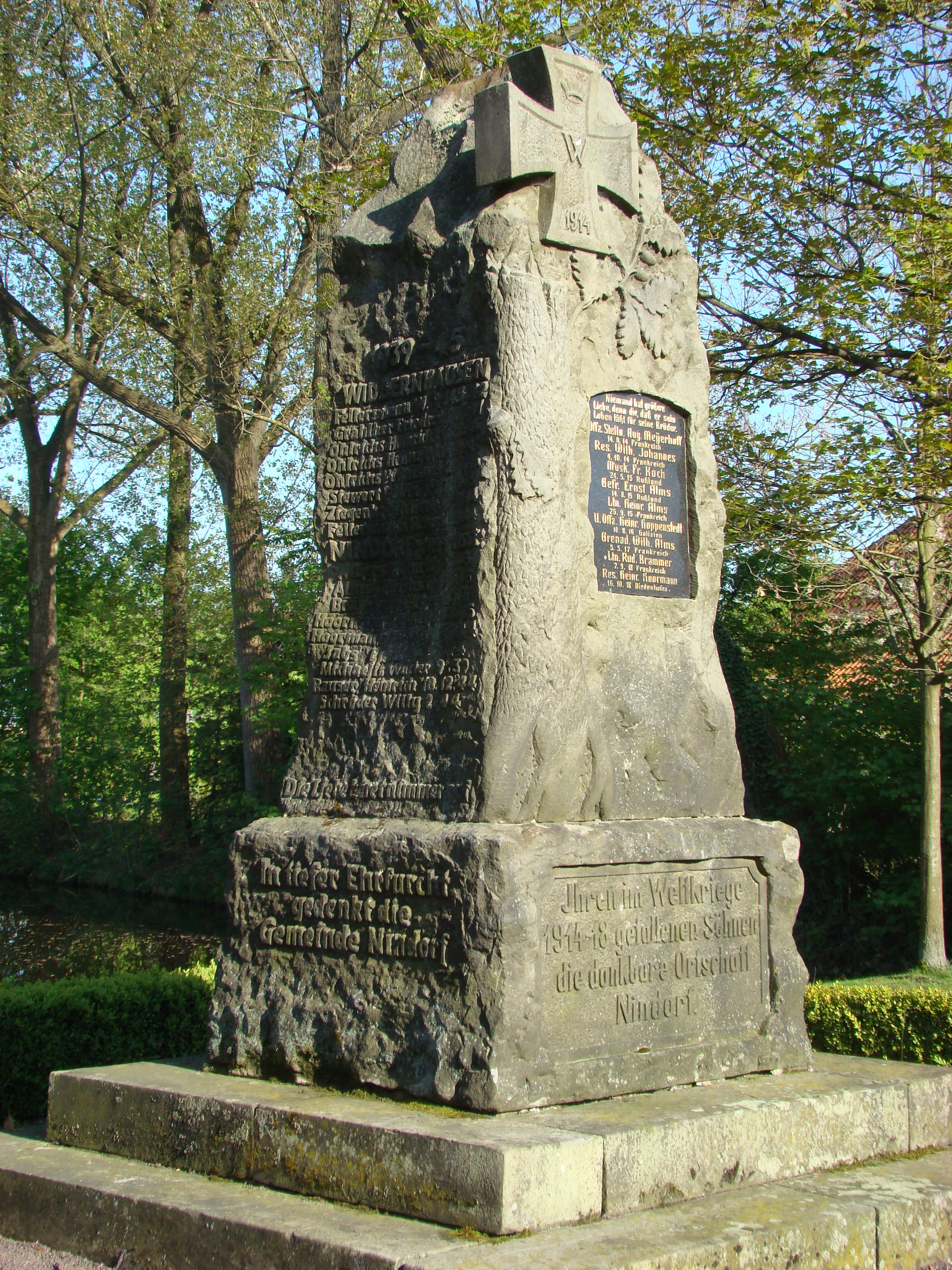
1914–1918 and 1939–1945 war memorial

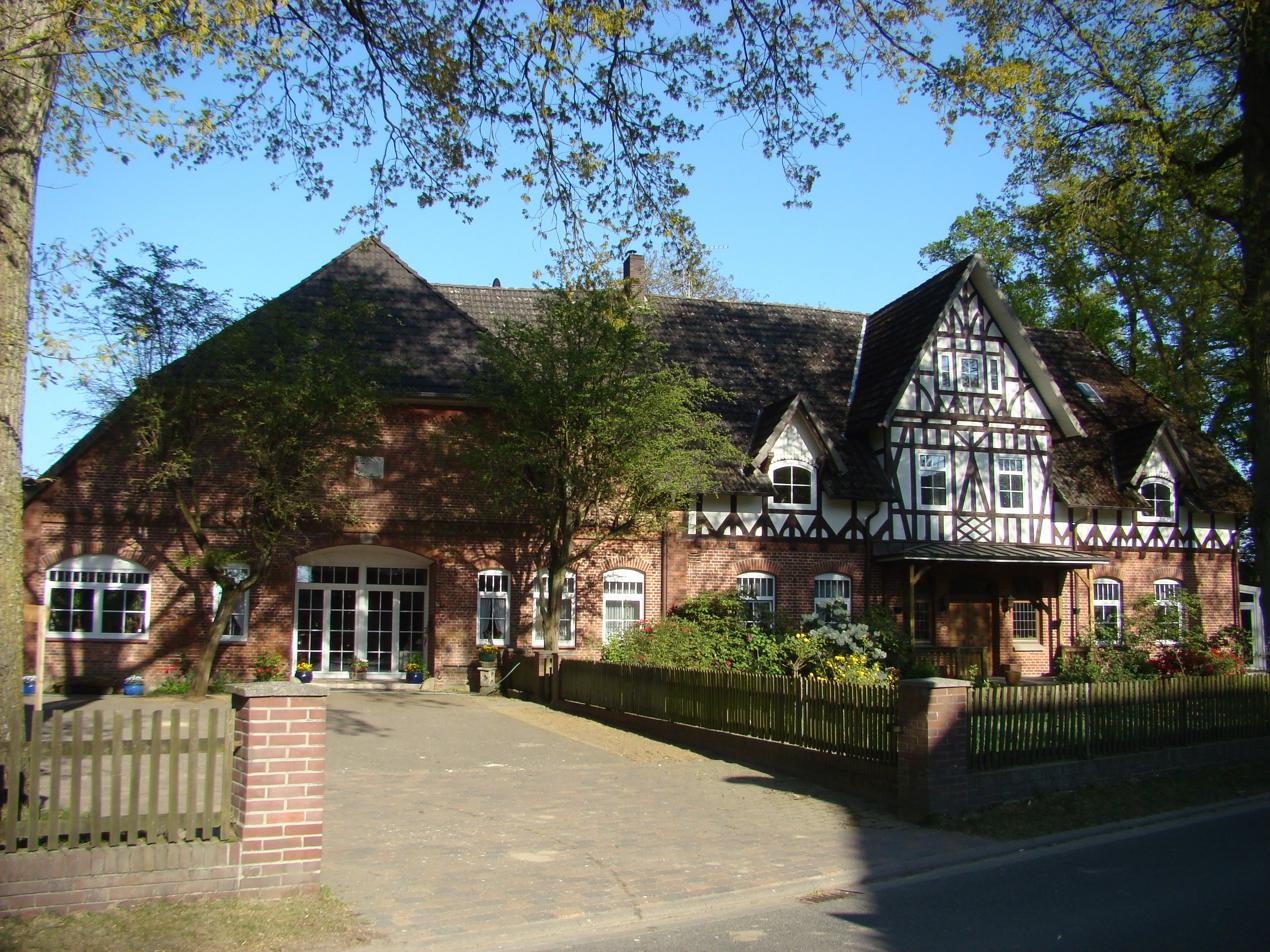
Modernised living quarters of a farmhouse

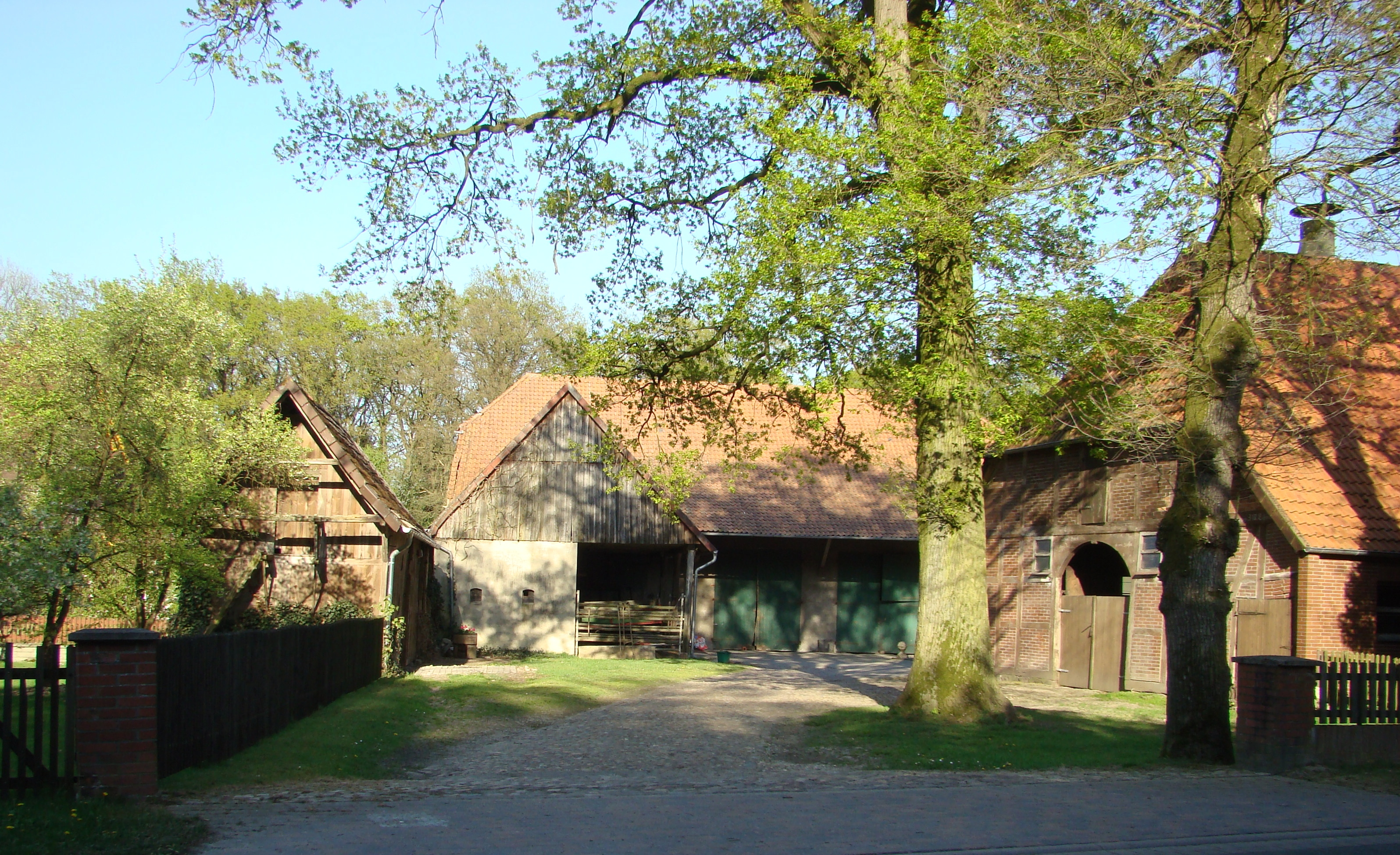
Old farmhouse with Treppenspeicher barn

== Politics ==
Since the Lower Saxon administrative reforms of 1973, Nindorf has been part of the town of Bergen. Nindorf is represented by a parish council (Ortsrat) and a chairman (Ortsbürgermeister). The council is empowered, inter alia, to make decisions about public services in the village, is responsible for maintaining the appearance of the village and for overseeing its clubs and societies, and has to be consulted by the town of Bergen on all important matters affecting the village. It consists of five elected representatives who, together with the chair, sit on the Bergen town council. The parish council elects its own chair. The current incumbent is Eckart Borges.

== Literature ==
- Wilfried Hormann: Aus der Geschichte von Nindorf, Typoskript 1963(73)
