= Aisleless church =

Type of church

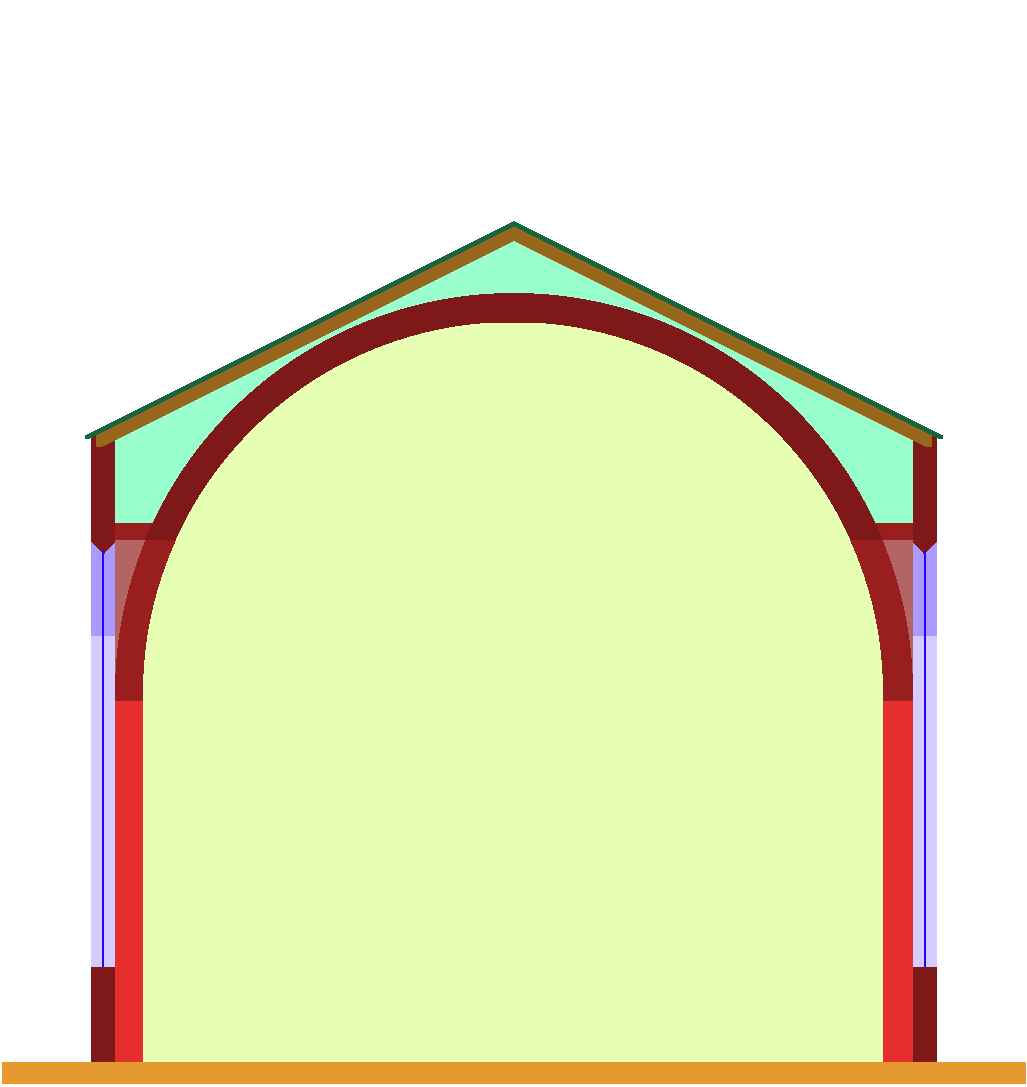
Scheme of an aisleless church, here with wallside pilasters and a barrel-vault.

An aisleless church (German: Saalkirche) is a single-nave church building that consists of a single hall-like room. While similar to the hall church, the aisleless church lacks aisles or passageways on either side of the nave and separated from the nave by colonnades or arcades, a row of pillars or columns. However, there is often no clear demarcation between the different building forms, and many churches, in the course of their construction history, developed from a combination of different types.

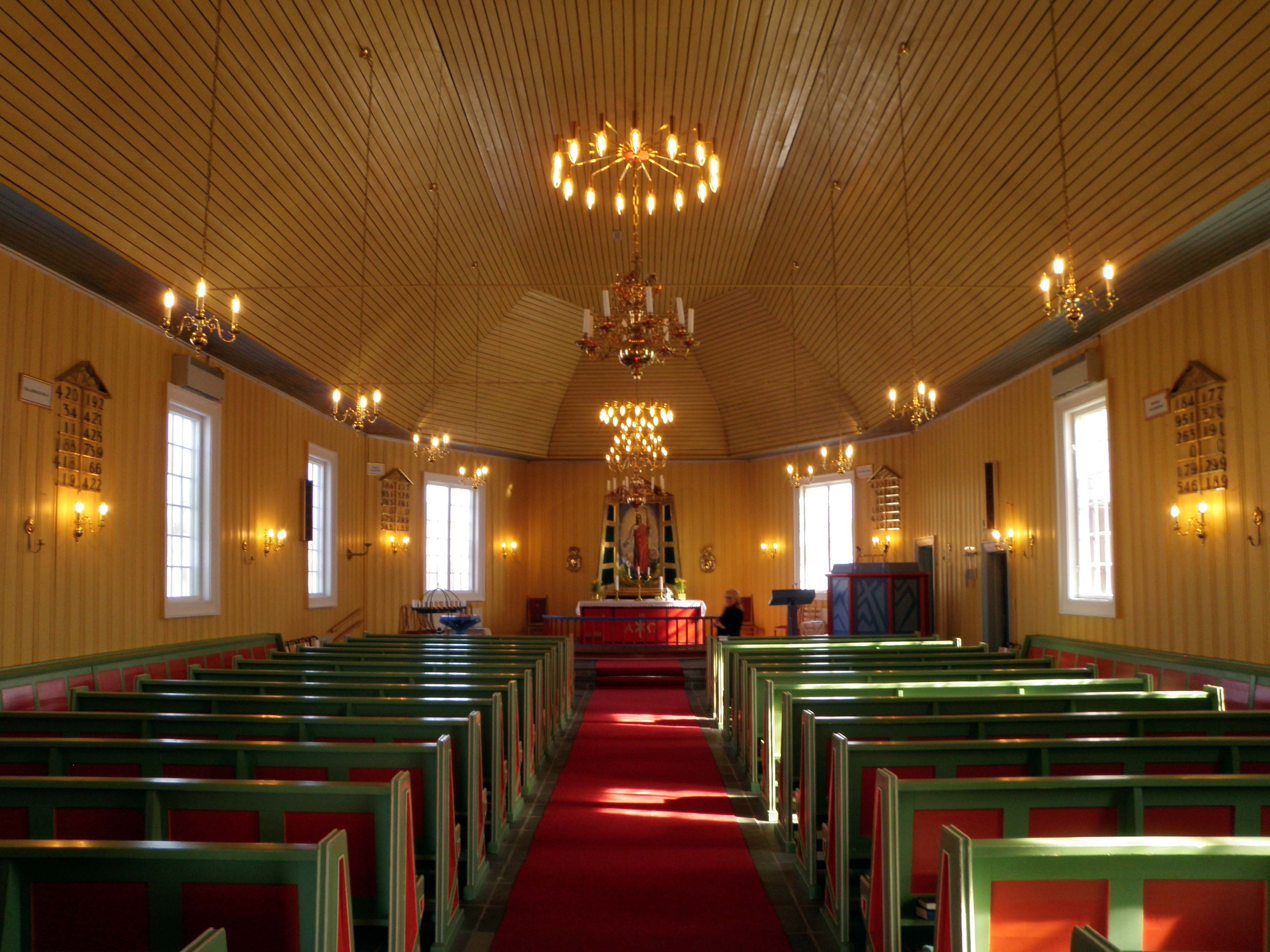
Interior of Kautokeino Church, a wooden building with a rectangular, aisleless shape. Built in 1958 after the previous was burnt down during the Operation Nordlicht (1944–45).

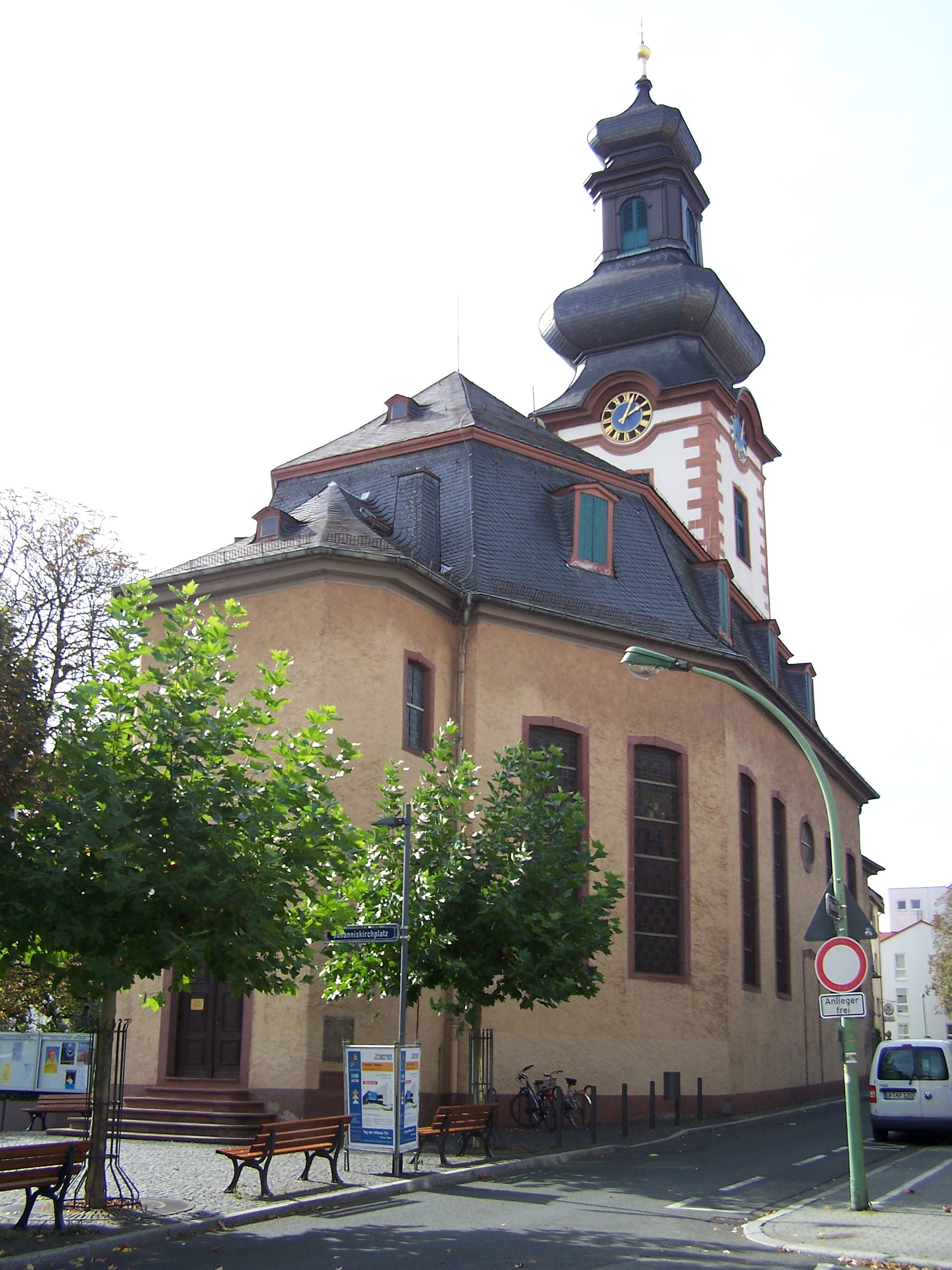
Johanniskirche in Frankfurt-Bornheim, a Baroque Saalkirche

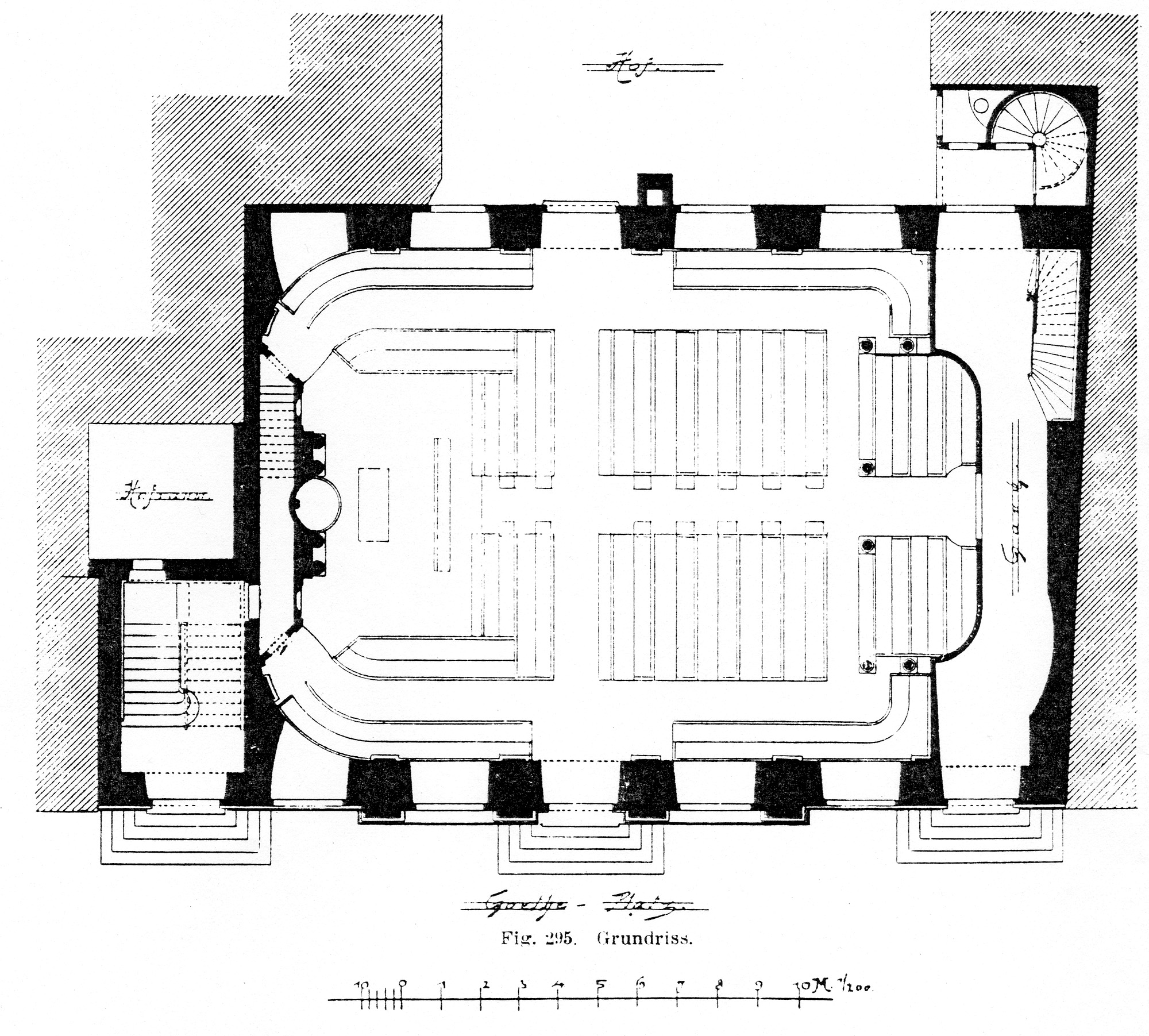
Floor plan of the French Reformed Church in Frankfurt

Early aisleless churches were generally small because of the difficulty of spanning a large, open space without using pillars or columns. In many places, where the population made it necessary and money was available, former medieval hall churches were extended over the course of centuries until they became a hall church or basilica. Starting in the Renaissance, the development of new technologies and better building materials allowed larger spaces to be spanned.

The basic form of the church hall is rectangular. Aisleless churches are generally aligned longitudinally so that the altar and choir are located at one of the narrower ends and are facing east. There are rare examples of transept aisleless churches, in which the altar area occupies the short side east of the transept.

This form of church building has proliferated since the Renaissance, especially in Protestant churches. It became the basis of modern church architecture. In Norway, the aisleless and elongated "long church" is the most common design and is regarded as the typical Norwegian church. The Norwegian long church usually includes a narthex/vestibule in a separate section, often in a somewhat lower and narrower room attached to the main body and traditionally in the western end of the building. Until 1940 about 850 of Norway's 1300 churches were aisleless; these numbers do not include some 1000 vanished stave churches many of which were aisleless. For instance Flesberg Stave Church for 500 years had a rectangular aisleless ground plan until it was expanded in 1735 by adding three arms to a cruciform aisleless shape.

== Examples ==
- Church of the Redeemer near Potsdam
- Church of St. Lambert's in Bergen, Lower Saxony
- Christuskirche in Dresden-Strehlen, Art Nouveau-style church
- The Hofkirche at Ludwigslust
- The largest aisleless church in Germany is the parish church of St. Vitus in Löningen.
- The Saalkirche in the northern Siebengebirge region
- The Providenzkirche in Heidelberg
- The Jakobikirche in Hildesheim.
- The Seminarkirche in Hildesheim.
- The Johanniskirche in Frankfurt-Bornheim a Baroque aisleless church.
- The Haltdalen Stave Church, now in a museum in Trondheim, is a single-nave stave church
- The Bakka Church is one of many hundred aisleless wooden "long churches" constructed in Norway from 1851 to 1900
