= Hagen (Bergen) =

- Ortsteil of Bergen
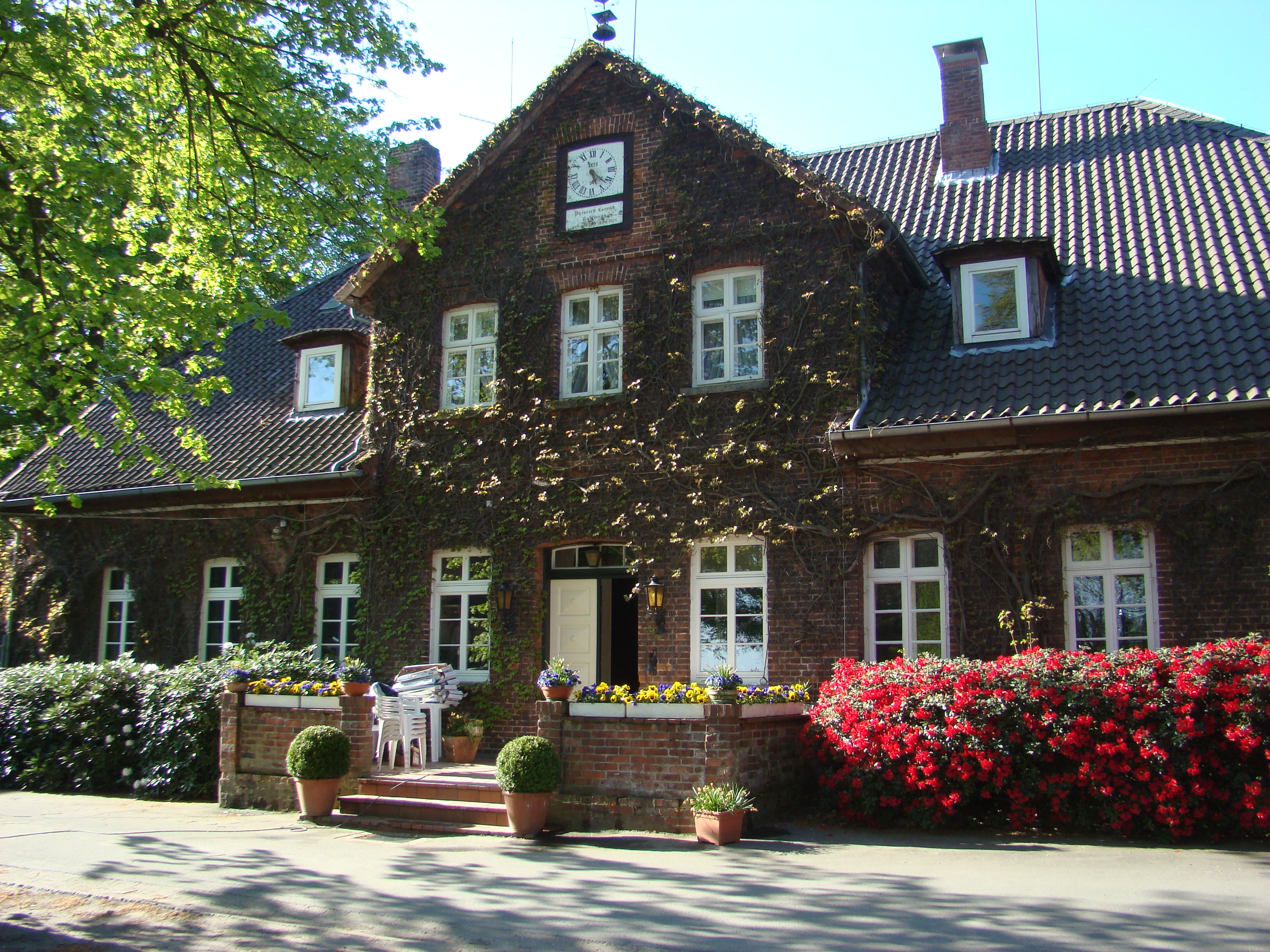
- Hagen Estate House with its old gable clock
- Interactive map of Hagen
- Location within Germany Location within Lower Saxony
- Coordinates: 52°49′40″N 9°58′15″E
- Country: Germany
- State: Lower Saxony
- District: Celle
- Town: Bergen
- Elevation: 77 m (253 ft)

Population (2019)
  - Total: 144
- Time zone: UTC+01:00 (CET)
  - Summer (DST): UTC+02:00 (CEST)
- Postal codes: 29303
- Dialling codes: 05051

Hagen (German pronunciation: [ˈhaːɡn̩]) is a village administered by the Lower Saxon town of Bergen in the northern part of Celle district on the Lüneburg Heath in North Germany. It has 144 inhabitants.

== History ==
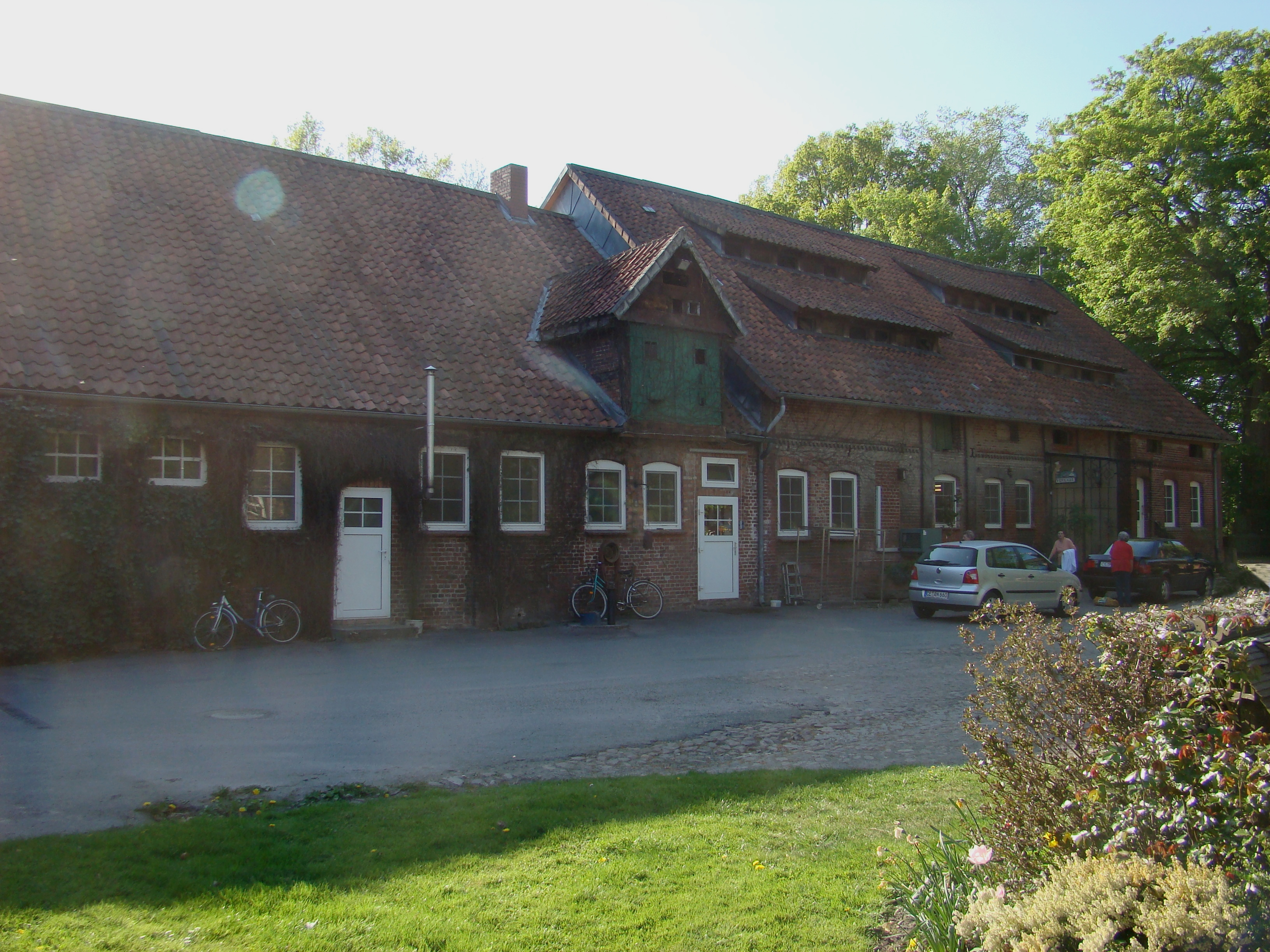
Old farm building on the Hagen Estate (Gut Hagen)

Hagen was first mentioned in the records in 1371 under the name of Hagene. Unlike the surrounding heathland villages its population has remained relatively constant in the last two centuries; only after the Second World War did numbers jump as a result of the influx of refugees. But they sank again in the years that followed to pre-war levels.

== Politics ==
Since the merging of local councils as part of the Lower Saxon administrative reforms of 1971, Hagen has been part of the town of Bergen. Hagen is represented by a parish council (Ortsrat) and a chairman (Ortsbürgermeister). The council is empowered, inter alia, to make decisions about public services in the village, is responsible for maintaining the appearance of the village and for overseeing its clubs and societies, and has to be consulted by the town of Bergen on all important matters affecting the village. It consists of five elected representatives who, together with the chair, sit on the Bergen town council. The parish council elects its own chair. The current incumbent is Hermann Reinecke.
