= St. Lambert's Church, Bergen =

Church in Bergen, Germany

Coordinates: 52°48′32″N 9°57′45″E

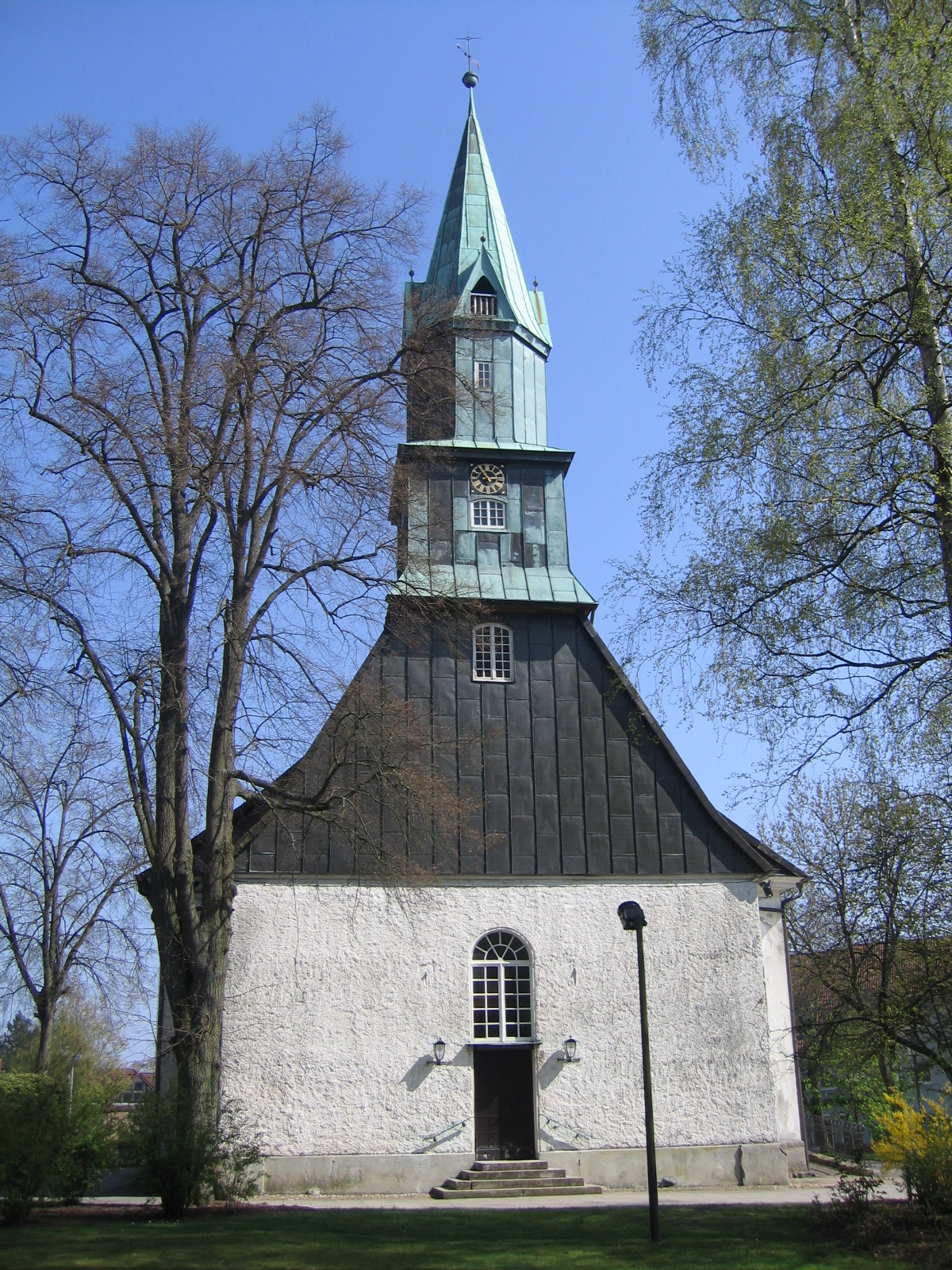
St. Lambert's, Bergen

St. Lambert's Church is the Lutheran town church in the town of Bergen in Celle district in Germany.

This Classicist aisleless church was built in 1826. It is a three-naved building with low ceilings over the galleries and was extended eastwards in 1900. The separately standing wooden clock tower dates from the year 1728.

Around 1900 the wooden barrel roof in the middle nave was decorated with ornamental, stencilled artwork that was removed again when the church was renovated in 1956. The dimensions of the roof remained the same, but a textile fabric was stuck to it to prevent the formation of cracks.

The last major renovation work (internal and external) was carried out in 1981 and 1982.

== Bells ==
The oldest bell, the Three Kings Bell (Dreikönigsglocke), dates from the period around 1500 and is located in its own flèche. The remaining bells (two steel bells preserved in the clock tower) were given an electric bell ringing system by the Herford electrical company of Bokelmann & Kuhlo.
