= Bergen, Lower Saxony =

Bergen
- Town
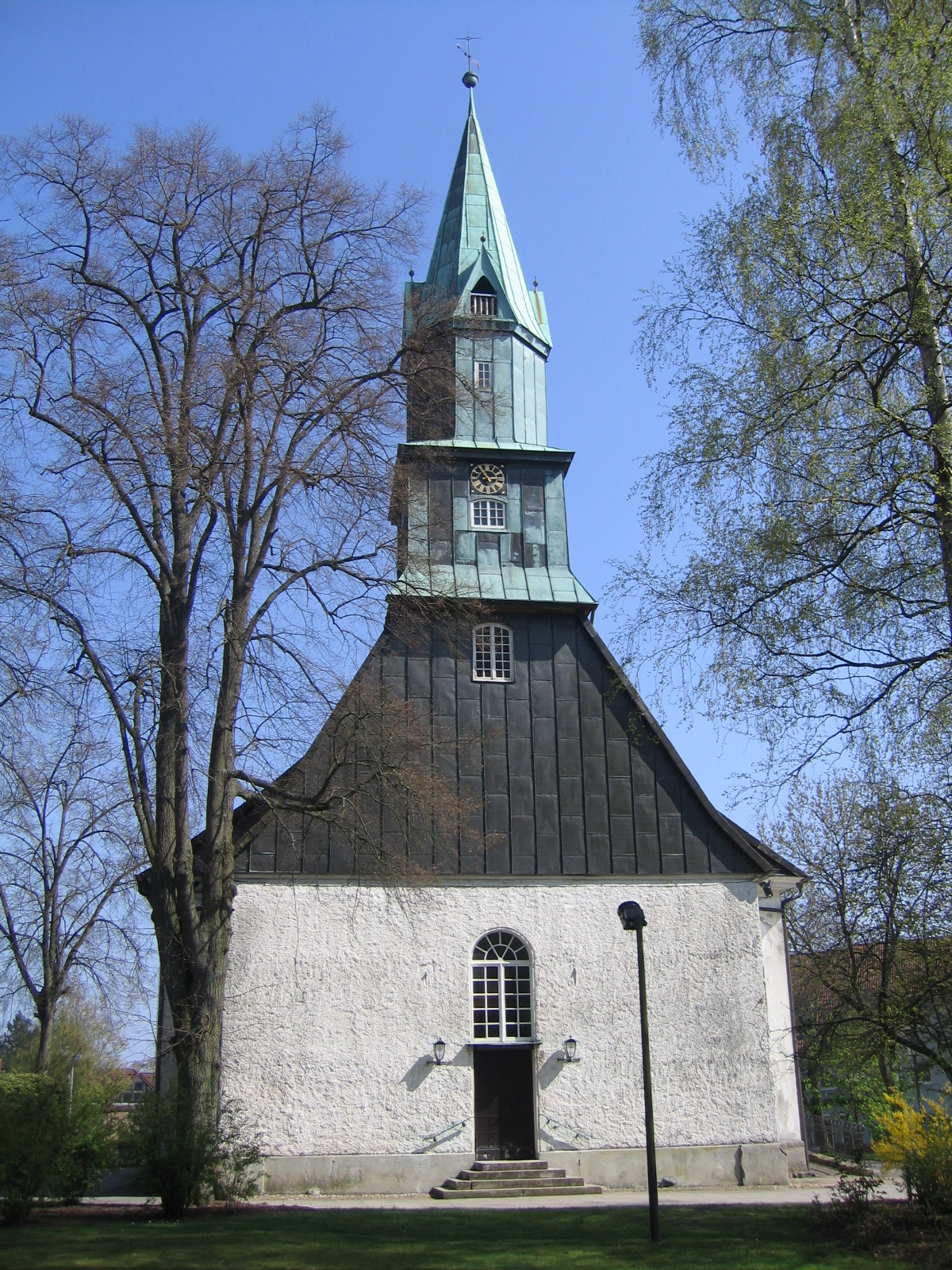
- St. Lambert's Church

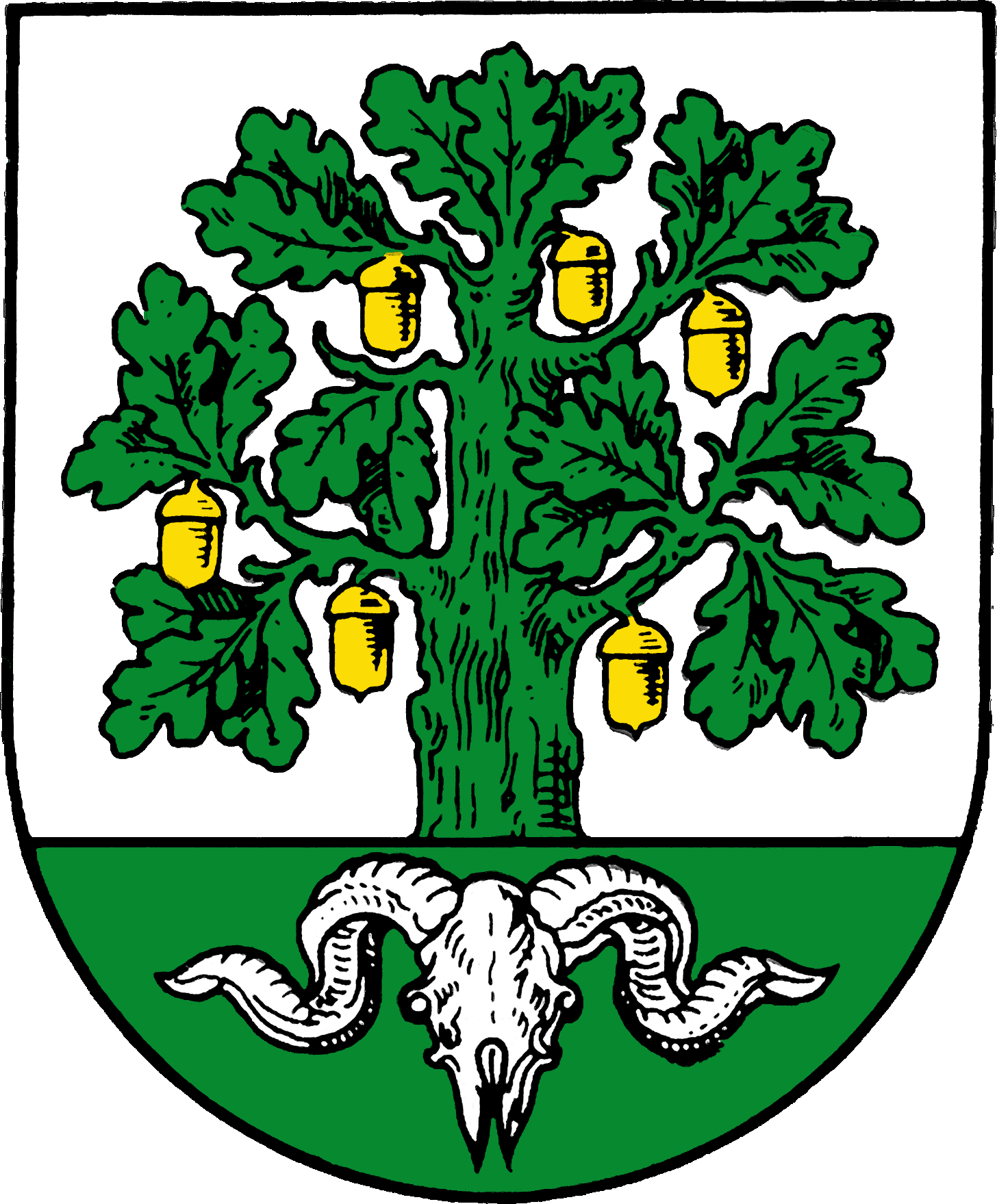
- Coat of arms

- Location of Bergen within Celle district
- Interactive map of Bergen
- Location within Germany Location within Lower Saxony
- Coordinates: 52°48′37″N 9°57′40″E
- Country: Germany
- State: Lower Saxony
- District: Celle
- Subdivisions: 13 districts

Government
  - Mayor (2019–24): Claudia Dettmar-Müller

Area
  - Total: 164.4 km^{2} (63.5 sq mi)
- Elevation: 77 m (253 ft)

Population (2025-12-31)
  - Total: 12,933
  - Density: 78.67/km^{2} (203.7/sq mi)
- Time zone: UTC+01:00 (CET)
  - Summer (DST): UTC+02:00 (CEST)
- Postal codes: 29303
- Dialling codes: 05051
- Vehicle registration: CE
- Website: www.bergen-online.de

Bergen (German pronunciation: [ˈbɛʁɡn̩]; Eastphalian: Bargen) is a town in the north of Celle district on the Lüneburg Heath, in Lower Saxony, Germany. Administratively it acts as a municipal borough divided into 12 subordinate parishes based on the town and its surrounding villages: Becklingen, Belsen, Bergen, Bleckmar, Diesten, Dohnsen, Eversen, Hagen, Hassel, Offen, Sülze and Wardböhmen. Bergen-Belsen concentration camp was located in the area of Belsen.

The town had 13,099 inhabitants according to the census conducted in December 2008. Members of the British military and their families, who were not included in the census, brought the actual population to about 17,000. These soldiers occupied a NATO base and exercise on the Bergen-Hohne Training Area just outside the town, but the base closed in summer 2015 as part of the British Army's withdrawal from Germany. The Sieben Steinhäuser, a cluster of dolmens dating from the Stone Age, are located within the training area.

== Geography ==
Bergen is located in the north of Celle district on the Lüneburg Heath, in Lower Saxony, Germany. The Bundesstraße 3 (B3) passed through the municipal territory from north to south.

=== Neighbouring communities ===
Bergen is bordered by (from the north, clockwise): Wietzendorf (located in Heidekreis district), Südheide, Eschede, Celle, Winsen an der Aller and the unincorporated area Lohheide (all in Celle district).

== History ==
Bergen was first mentioned in the records in 1197 and was the centre of a legislative and administrative region, the seat of the district sheriff (Amtsvogtei) and, later, the Royal Hanoverian Office. After the annexation of the Kingdom of Hanover by Prussia in 1866 the Amt Bergen, formed in 1852, was incorporated into Fallingbostel district, which had been created in 1867. In the district reorganisation of 1885, the Amt was transferred into the newly formed Celle district.

If the development of Bergen was rather slow during the Middle Ages and the early part of the Modern Age, due mainly to fires in 1354, 1585 and 1796, the agricultural reform in the 19th century and the town's connection to the Celle–Soltau railway led to far-reaching changes. In particular, the creation of the military training area that is today the Bergen-Hohne Training Area in 1935 encouraged the beginning of a period of urbanisation that has led to Bergen's transformation from an agriculturally based village into the small town it is today, characterised by trade and commerce with agriculture having largely lost its significance.

The Bergen-Belsen concentration camp is located near Bergen.

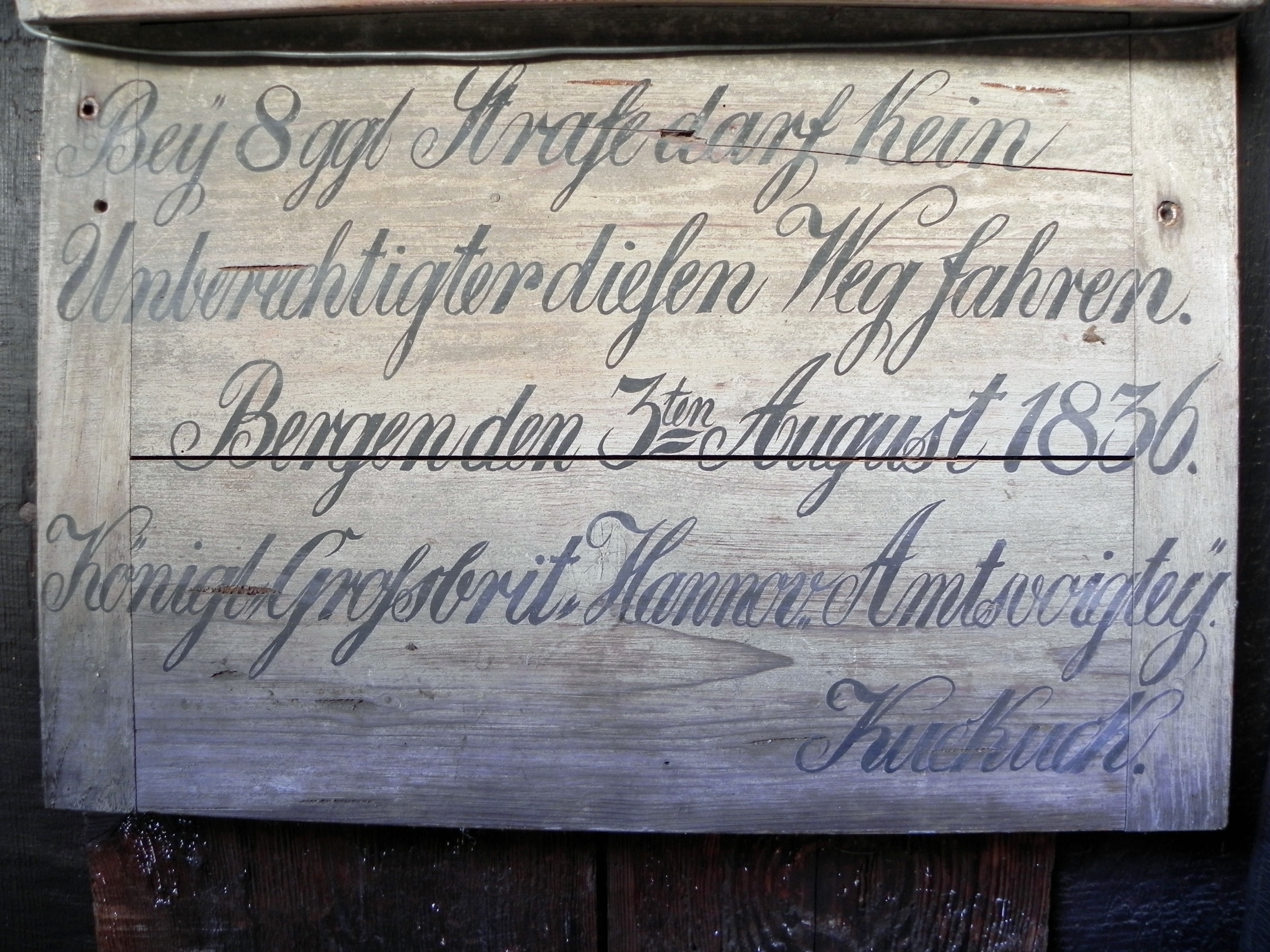
1836 "no entry" road sign by order of the "Royal Great British and Hanoverian District Office"

Today the town of Bergen acts as a municipality in the northern part of Celle district and is, except for Celle, the only political entity in the district that has been granted the status of a town (in this case in 1957). In the Gebietsreform (municipal reorganization) of 1971, Bergen was given responsibility for the Stadtteile of Becklingen, Belsen, Bleckmar, Diesten, Dohnsen, Eversen, Hagen, Hassel, Nindorf, Offen, Sülze and Wardböhmen. That significantly increased the size of its population and its area. The area of the original town of Bergen was 11 square kilometres (4.2 sq mi); after the administrative reform it grew to 163 km^{2}.

== Demographics ==
Today around 14,000 people live in the town of Bergen. About 3,000 members of the British Forces and their families departed in summer 2015 when the British left Bergen-Hohne Garrison.

== Arts and culture ==
Due to the presence of foreign troops in the area, including Dutch and British both military and their families have come to Bergen. This has influenced the cultural environment of the town strongly; for example a typical Dutch carnival is held annually which is very uncharacteristic of this area. The Bergen-Hohne British base held a bonfire night on 5 November which was free to all local residents to attend forming strong ties with the community.

== Attractions ==
=== Römstedthaus local history museum ===
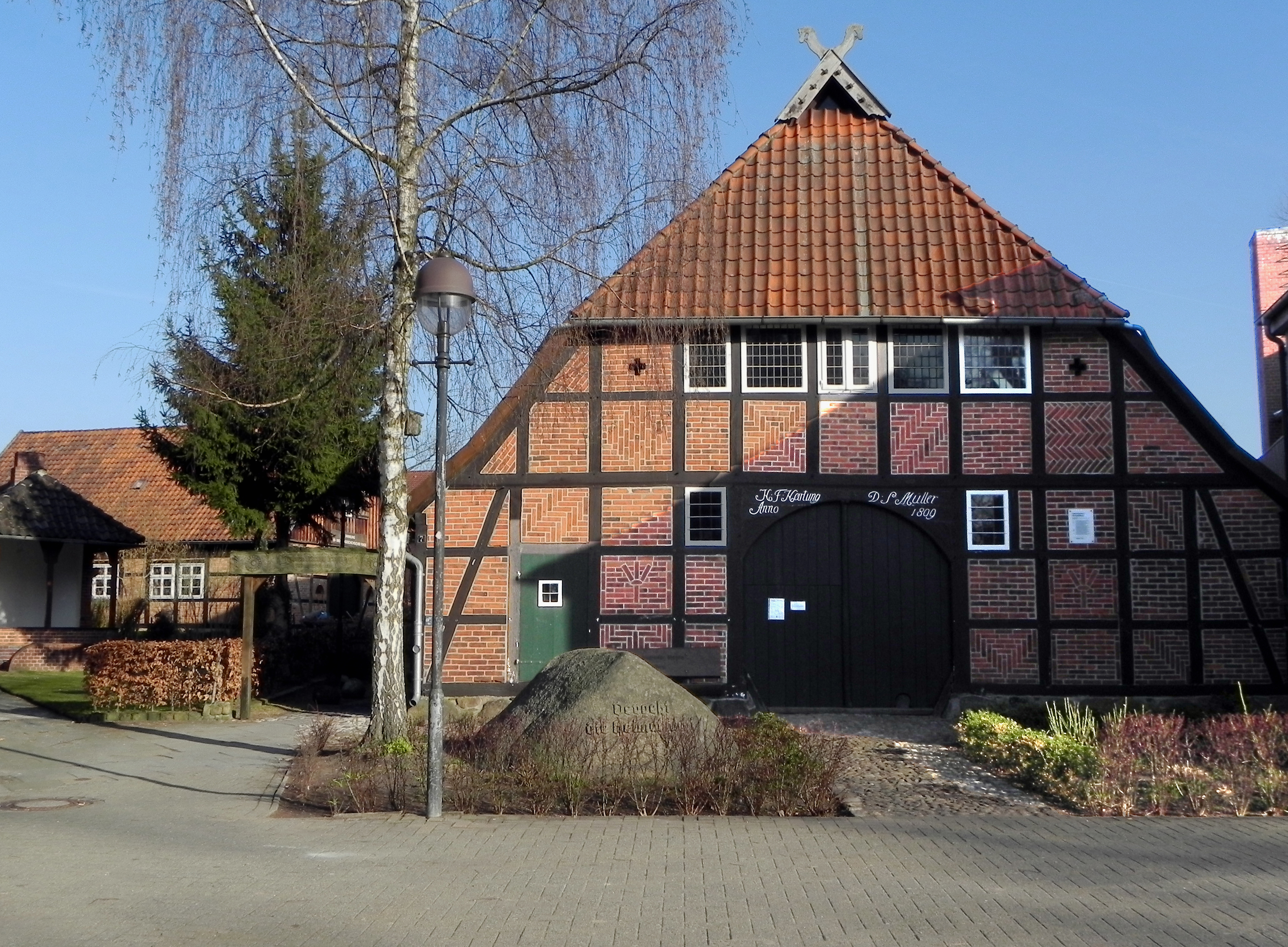
Römstedthaus local history museum

The Römstedthaus is a farmhouse museum dedicated to local and regional history. Its focus is the life and work of farmer up to the turn of the century in 1900. It is located in a former smokehouse (Rauchhaus), about 350 years old, that is still on the spot it was built. The old farmstead and church cottage (Pfarrkote) was first mentioned in 1438. "Wobbeke Scroders" was the farmer at that time. In 1831 the cottage and the land were rented, and the house continued to be used until 1912 as a smokehouse. The Bergen Local History Society bought the house in 1912. The preceptor, Friedrich Römstedt (1849–1930), furnished the house with a collection of prehistoric and local historic artefacts. In 1913 the museum was opened.

In the middle of the military training area to the west of Bergen are the well known Sieben Steinhäuser, a group of five megalithic graves from the late Funnelbeaker culture (3500-2800 B.C.), which are today a cultural monument.

=== Memorials ===
In the centre of town, on the Friedensplatz ("Peace Square") immediately next to St. Lambert's Church are three memorials:

- A war memorial - to the fallen of the First (1914–1918) and Second World Wars (1939–1945). It was inaugurated on 30 April 1922. On the front is the inscription "Das Kirchspiel Bergen 1914–1918 seinen Helden" ("The parish of Bergen 1914–1918 [in honour of] its heroes") and on the rear: "Die Liebe höret nimmer auf" ("Love never ends").
- A sandstone monument - with a white marble plaque in memory of the fallen of the Franco-Prussian War (1870–1871). Inaugurated on 22 June 1878. The marble tablet bears the inscription "In Erinnerung an die in den Jahren 1870 u. 71 gefallenen Krieger aus dem Kirchspiel Bergen" ("In memory of those warriors from the parish of Bergen who fell in the years 1870 and 1871").
- A peace monument - that has a lively history. It was originally erected for the peace celebrations on the occasion of the ending of French rule. In the Battle of Leipzig (October 1813) the troops of the Emperor Napoleon Bonaparte were defeated and the First Treaty of Paris was signed (30 May 1814). By order of the prince-regent (Britain's George IV) all the churches of the land celebrated a peace festival on 24 July 1814. The square, hitherto, called Buernbrink and used for annual fairs, was given the name of Friedensplatz ("Peace Square"). A wooden post was erected which bore the inscription "Zur Friedensfeier! Bergen, den 24. Juli 1814" – "Dem Vaterlande Heil" – "Friede dem Jahrhunderte" ("The Peace Festival! Bergen, 24 July 1814" - "Salvation to the Fatherland" - "Peace to the centuries"). In the mid-19th century the post, which had meanwhile become rotten, fell over and was replaced in 1865 by another wooden monument for the 50th anniversary of the Battle of Waterloo. That monument also deteriorated and was replaced by the present sandstone one. This has the following inscription: Zur Friedensfeier – Bergen, den 24. Juli – 1814. Erneuert zur – 50 jährigen Jubelfeier – der Schlacht bei – Waterloo – am 18. Juni 1865 – und errichtet in Stein – 1898 ("To the peace celebrations in Bergen on 24 July 1814. Restored for the 50th anniversary celebration of the Battle of Waterloo on 18 June 1865 and erected in stone in 1898")

On the back of the monument is the crowned cursive monogram "GR" (Georgius Rex) of George V King of Hanover. On the sides are the words: Dem Vaterlande Heil ("Salvation to the Fatherland") and Friede dem Jahrhunderte ("Peace to the centuries").

Monuments in the centre of Bergen

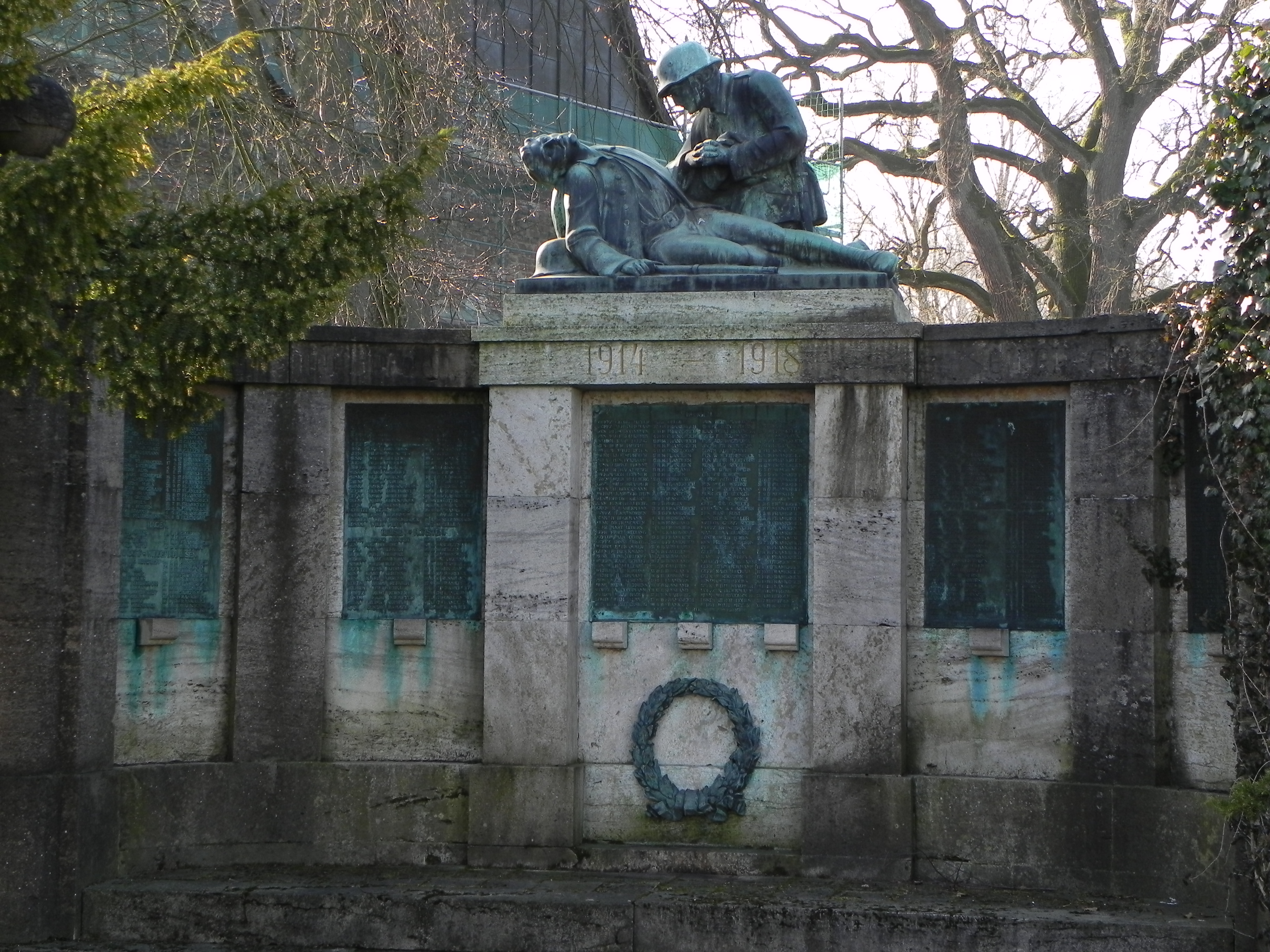
1914-18 war memorials

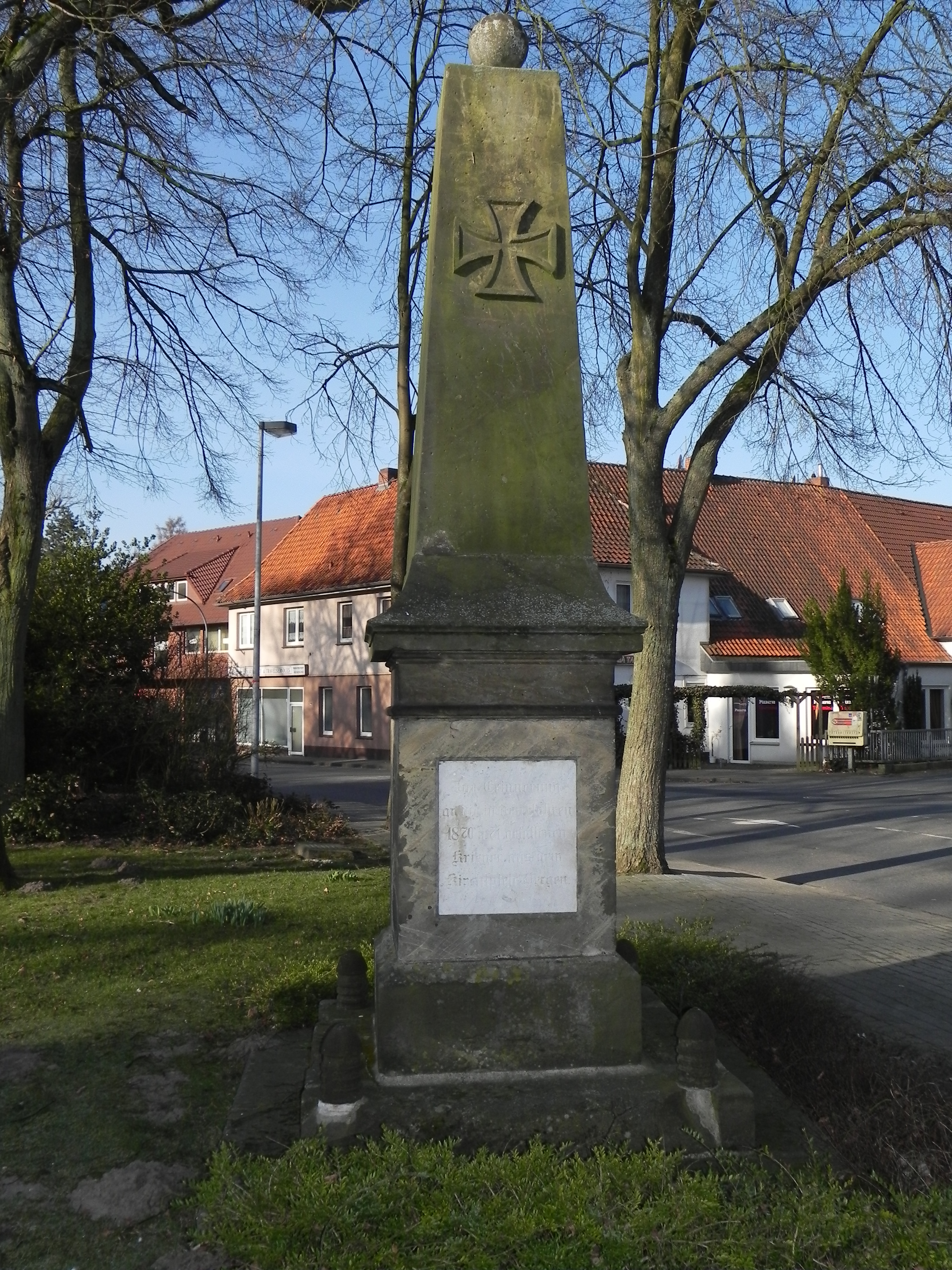
Monument to the fallen of 1870-71

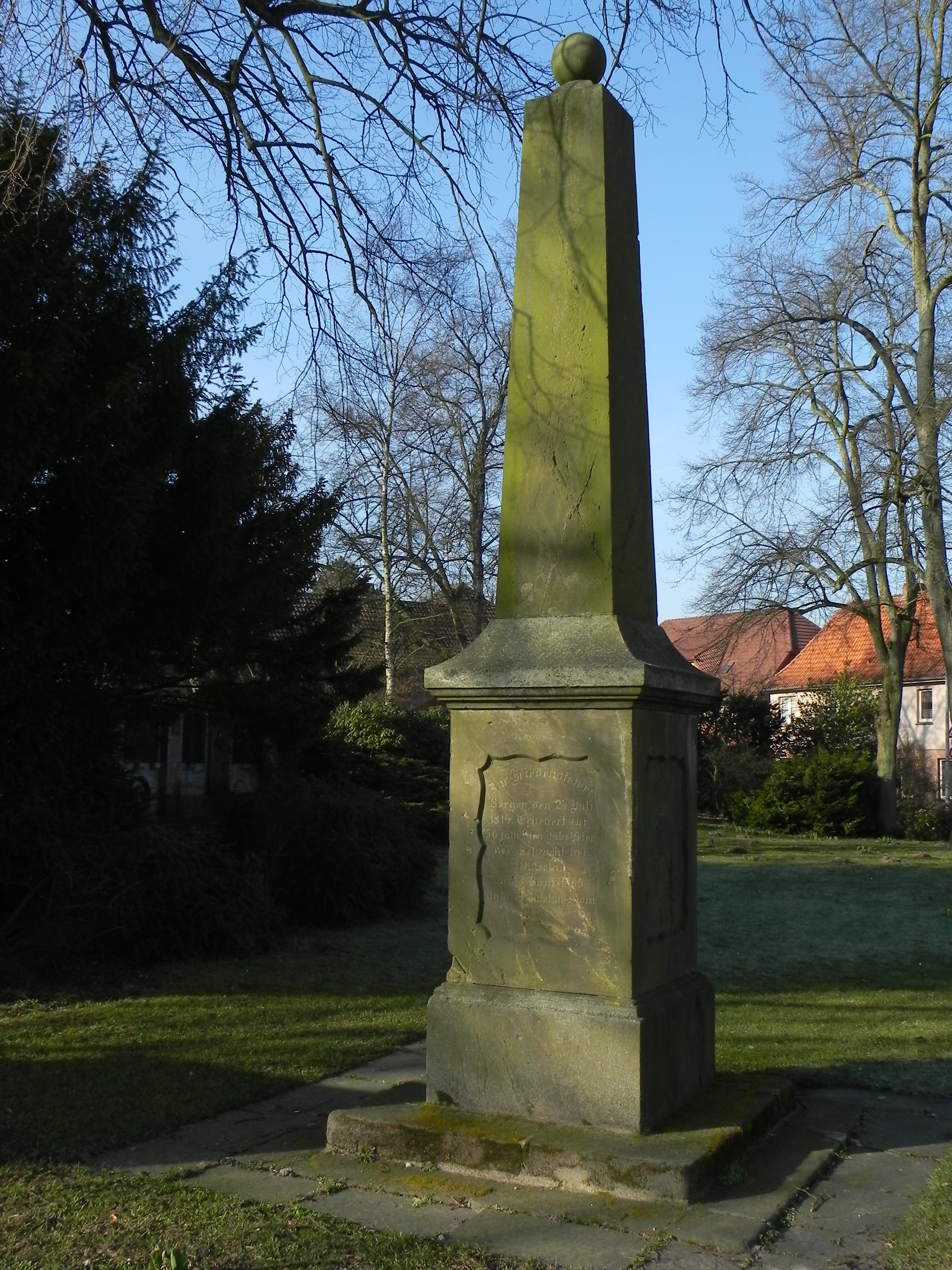
Monument marking the end of French rule and 50th anniversary of the Battle of Waterloo

== Government ==
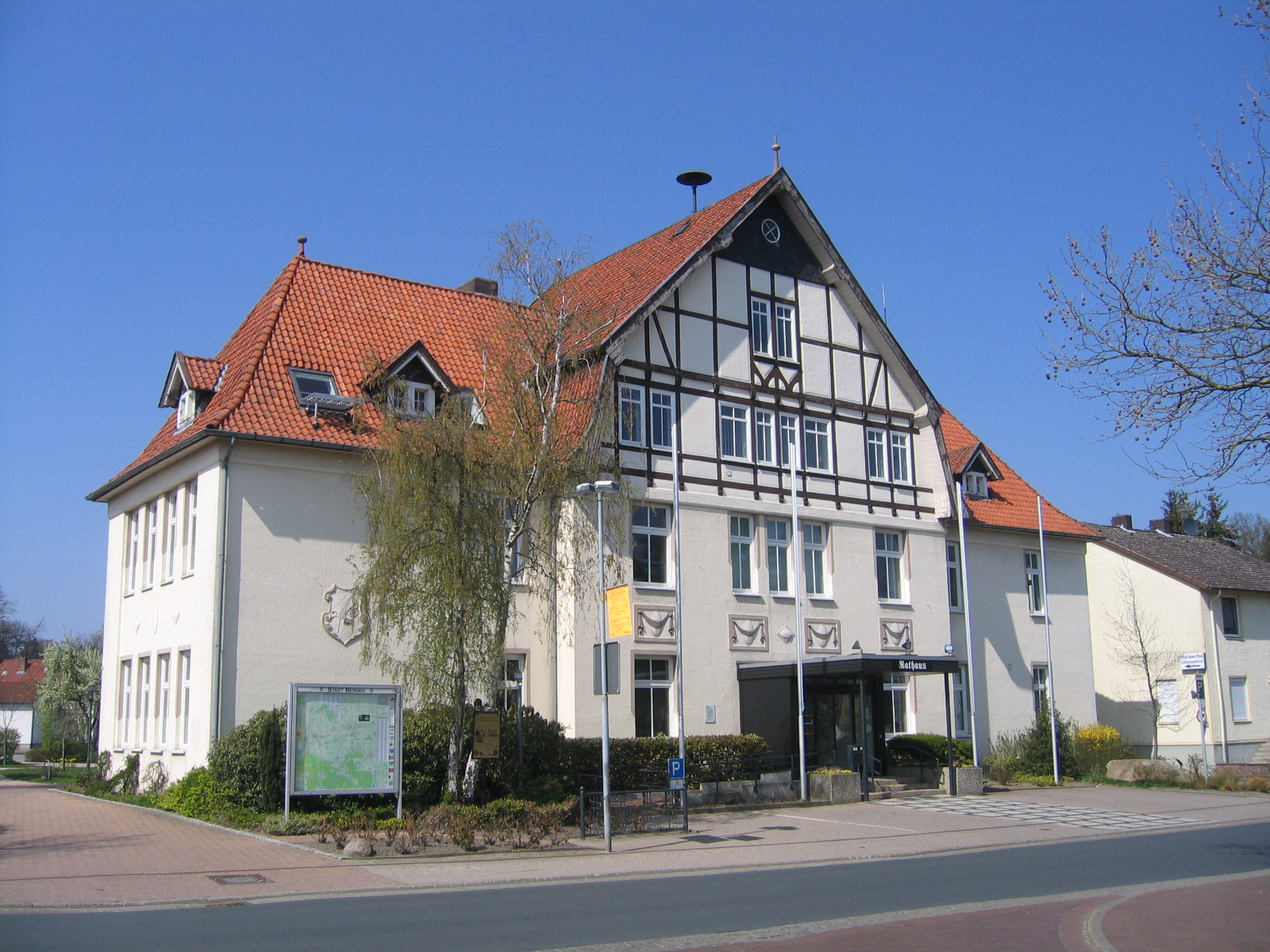
Bergen town hall

Since the Lower Saxony Gebietsreform (administrative reforms) of 1973 the municipality of Bergen has comprised Becklingen, Belsen, Bergen, Bleckmar, Diesten, Dohnsen, Eversen, Hagen, Hassel, Nindorf, Offen, Sülze and Wardböhmen.

=== Council ===
The town council (Stadtrat) has 30 elected members, as well as its directly elected mayor (hauptamtlicher Bürgermeister). Since the local elections of 10 September 2006 the following parties and voter groups have belonged to the council:

- Christian Democrats (CDU): 17 seats
- Social Democrats (SPD): 7 seats
- Bergen Voters Party (Wählergemeinschaft Bergen): 3 seats
- Free Democrats (FDP): 2 seats
- Greens: 1 seat.

=== Mayors ===
Bergen has had the following mayors (Bürgermeister) since 1945:

- 9 May 1945 – 1 November 1945 Albert Repke (CDU) (acting mayor)
- 4 December 1945 – 23 September 1946 Hermann Hornbostel (CDU) (acting mayor)
- 1 November 1946 – 1948 Friedrich Kruse sen. (Lower Saxon State Party)(NLP) (first freely elected mayor after 1945)
- 14 December 1948 – 1952 Walter Müller (German Party)(DP)
- 1952–1956 Wilhelm Brockmann (Independent Voter Party)(UW)
- 1956–1960 Wilhelm Brockmann (DP)
- 1960–1973 Wilhelm Brockmann (CDU) (The election of October 1960 was delayed to March 1961 due to a constitutional complaint)
- 1973–1976 Heinrich Schneider (CDU)
- 1976–1981 Dr. Walther Kothe (CDU)
- 1981–1983 Franz Christian von Harling (CDU)
- 1983 – 31 December 1997 Dr. Helmut Wegner (CDU)
- 1 January 1997 – 26 April 1998 Adolf Krause (CDU)
- 27 April 1998 - 31 October 2019 Rainer Prokop (CDU)(born 27 December 1950)(first full-time mayor)
- 1 November 2019 – Present Claudia Dettmar-Müller (independent) - (first female mayor)

In addition to the town council the individual villages each have a local council (Ortsrat) and a local chairman (Ortsbürgermeister).

=== Town twinning ===
Bergen maintains partnerships with the towns of:

wales

Pembroke & Pembroke Dock in Wales

Hendrik-Ido-Ambacht in the Netherlands

Śrem in Poland

It also partners with the home county (Heimatkreis) of:

Szubin (1941–1945 Altburgund) in Poland adopted the town of Bergen in 1956. There often used to be more than 1,000 participants at the annual meeting of the former home county of Altburgund-Schubin.

In addition the town of Bergen has friendly relations with the following:

Rožnov pod Radhoštěm in the Czech Republic

Ottendorf-Okrilla in the county of Bautzen in Saxony

Pembroke (Malta) in Malta

== Infrastructure ==
=== District court ===
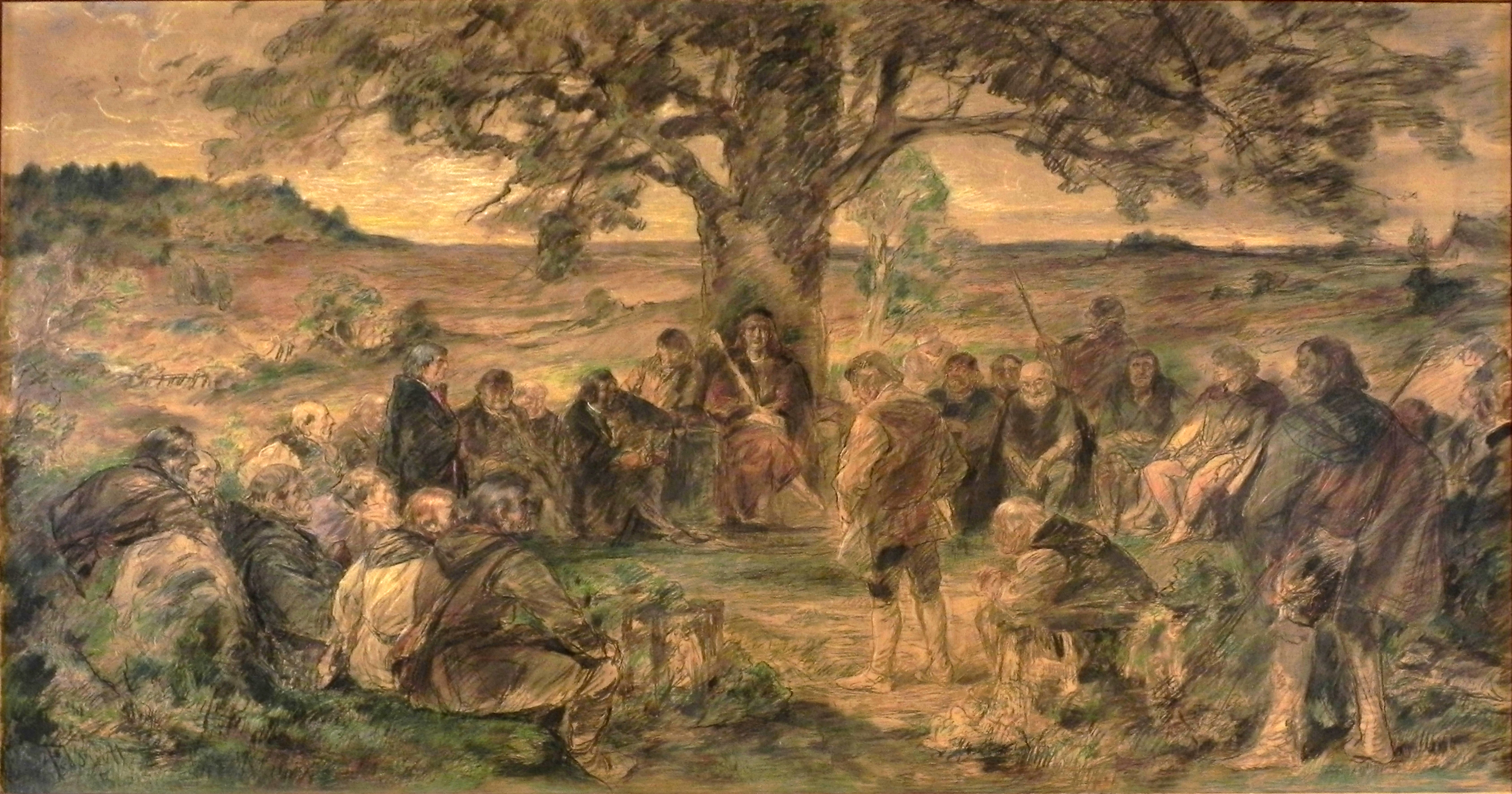
The Gogericht by Ferdinand Brütt which hangs in the present council chamber of the municipal hall

From the 15th century the parishes of Bergen and Wietzendorf were part of a united juridical district or Gogericht. From 1437 to 1852, the courts were presided over by judges known as Gografen. They were subordinated to the advocacy or Vogtei of Celle, which later became a Great Advocacy (Großvogtei). The first Gograf was Ludermann Tunderen (1437–1445). From 1674 the new Lüneburg district constitution set out the range of responsibilities of the district advocacies (Amtsvogteien). Until the end of the Thirty Years' War the private residence of the district advocates (Amtsvögte) also served as their seat (Amtssitz).

In 1651 the old house of Kocksche Kote, Bergen No. 5, which paid dues to the Abbey of St. Michael's in Lüneburg, became the official seat of the district judge. In 1653 the government bought the farmstead from the heirs of the district judge, Cord Brase, and upgraded it into a district advocacy building (Amtsvogteigebäude). In 1709 the building, was completely rebuilt under district advocate, Jost Hinrich Wolff (Bergen's primary school is named after him). In 1852 there was a separation of the judiciary from the administration within the Kingdom of Hanover. From then on, Prussian law applied and there was both a district office (Amt Bergen) and a district court (Amtsgericht Bergen). In the wake of these reforms, the Vogtei of Wietzendorf was split away from Bergen. The first district judge (Amtsrichter) was Ernst August Eggert von Estorff. On the land of the district court, which amounts to 6,480 m^{2}, there is an office building, a residential building, a district prison and several outbuildings. In 1945 there was a reform of the German courts. The district court in Bergen became a branch of the district court of Celle. On 1 July 1973 the Bergen District Court was closed.

=== Municipal hall (Stadthaus) ===
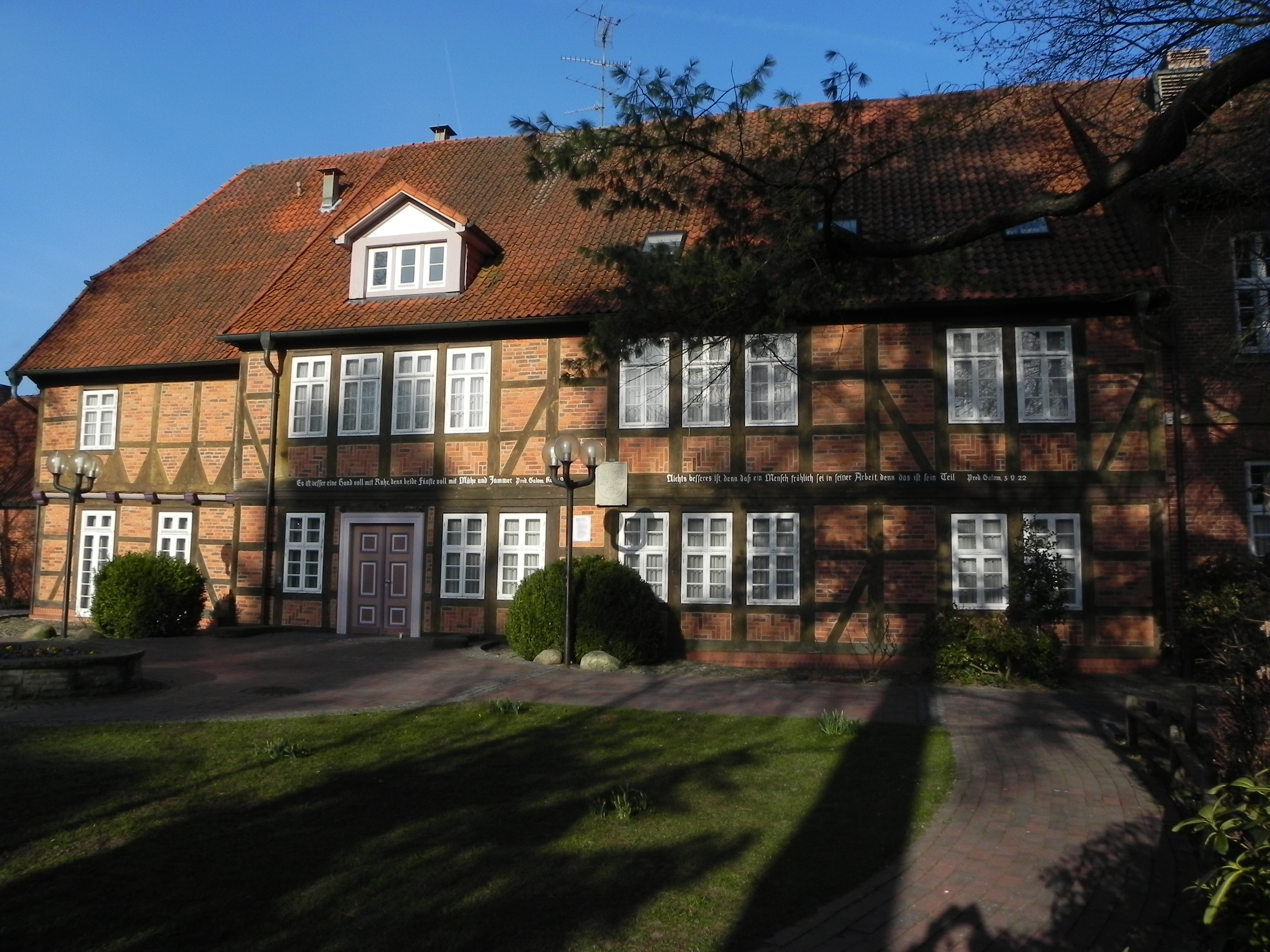
The Stadthaus (former district court)

In 1975 the town of Bergen sold the land of the old district court. Initially it was used as a youth centre, but there were plans for a leisure centre or town library. Even a police school was considered. In 1979 it was decided to sell the old town hall and move the council offices here. Because the negotiations over the sale dragged on and a large number of the townsfolk were against the proposal, it was eventually dropped. On 20 October 1981 it was decided to build a new municipal building with a banquet hall. The old district office of 1653/1709 and the district prison from 1853 were to be largely preserved as listed buildings and integrated. In an architectural competition, Hans-Joachim Ehrich from Brunswick won first prize for his design. In 1984 the rebuilding work began. On 6 December 1985 the new municipal hall or Stadthaus was inaugurated. It had cost over seven million DM. It has a banqueting hall for up to 530 people with a stage and side rooms, event rooms, a council chamber with a gallery, and various conference rooms. In the council chamber of the Stadthaus hangs the painting Gogericht by Bergen artist, Ferdinand Brütt (1849−1936). It was a precursor to a painting in the Lüneburg State Court (Landgericht Lüneburg).

=== Military training area ===
Between Bergen, Meißendorf and Fallingbostel, roughly in the area between the A 7 and the B 3, is the military training area of Bergen-Hohne. To create this training area, several villages, including Hartem, were evacuated in 1938 by the German Wehrmacht, along with individual homesteads. Some of their ruins can still be seen. Within a few years about 3,650 inhabitants from 25 parishes had to leave their homes. On the eastern perimeter of the terrain, near the village of Belsen, at that time called Ostlager, around 100 barrack blocks, 50 horse stables and 40 large vehicle garages were built, along with a medical centre, depots and a target factory. The largest village in this area was and is Ostenholz, which was not cleared and is like an island of habitation within the training area.

Today, the area is used by the Bundeswehr and other NATO forces. The civil administration of the training area is carried out by the two unincorporated areas of Lohheide in the east and Osterheide in the west.

=== Churches and religious organisations ===
- Lutheran parish of St. Lambert's
- Gemeinde Gottes Bergen
- Roman-Catholic parish of Zum kostbaren Blute
- Independent Lutheran parish of St. John in Bergen-Bleckmar
- Missionary work: Bleckmar branch of the Lutheran Church Mission (Lutherische Kirchenmission − Bleckmarer Mission e. V.) since 1892.

=== Transport ===
Bergen lies on the B 3 federal highway from Celle via Soltau to Ovelgönne near Buxtehude. Several state roads (Landesstraßen) serve the surrounding area which is mainly agricultural and lead, inter alia, to Hermannsburg and Winsen (Aller). The nearest motorway junction is Soltau-Süd on the A7 autobahn from Hamburg to Hanover. In addition, the Celle–Soltau railway runs through the town. This no longer provides a passenger service, but is very important for the transportation of goods.

== Notable people ==
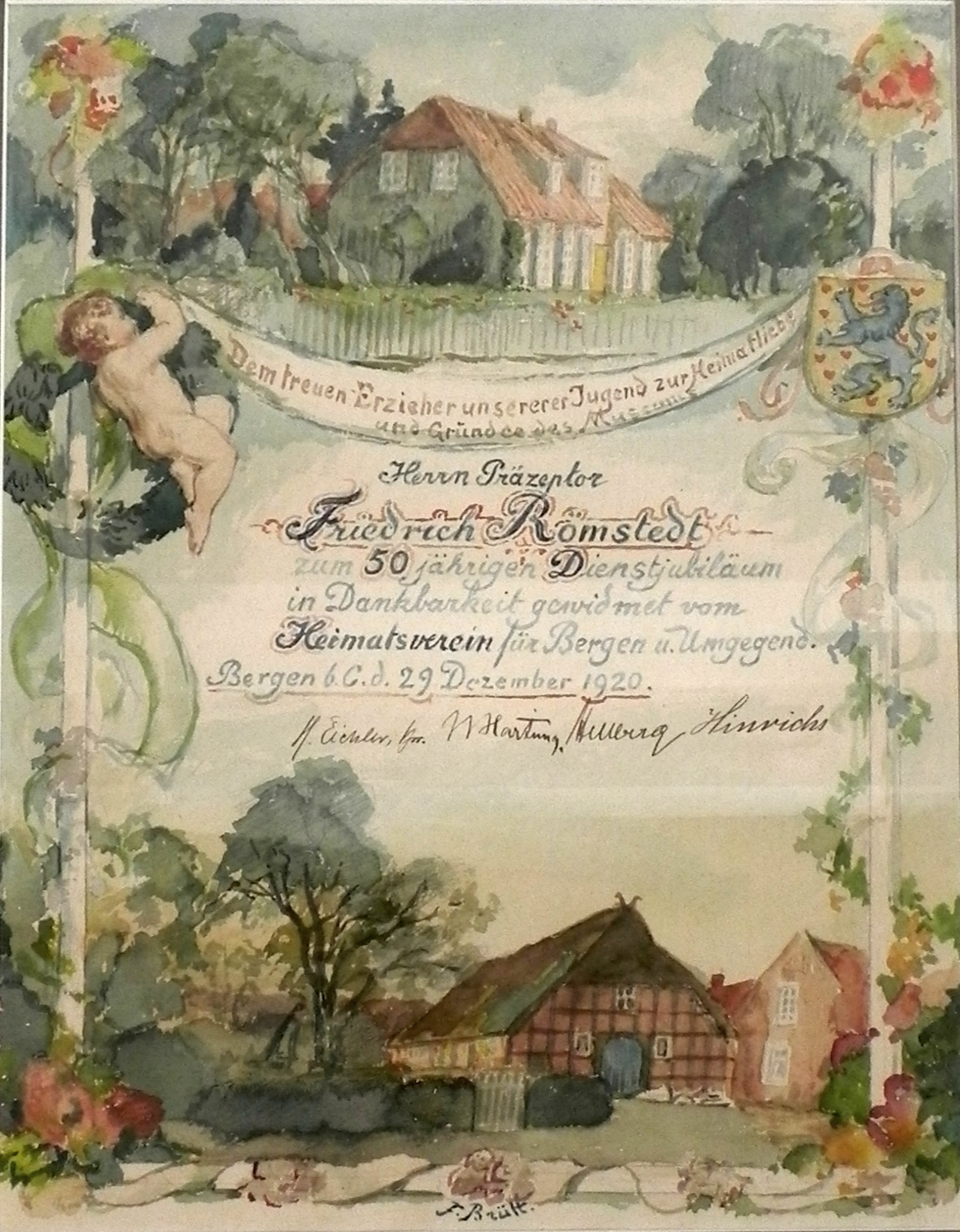
Drawing by Ferdinand Brütt for the 50th anniversary of the Preceptor of Römstedt

- Ferdinand Brütt (b 13 July 1849 in Hamburg; d 6 November 1936 in Bergen) was a German painter. Brütt was a distant cousin of the sculptor, Adolf Brütt.
- Detlef Klahr (born 1957), since 2007 dean of the East Friesland diocese of the Evangelical Lutheran State Church of Hanover.
- Hermann Ehlers (1904-1954) German politician (CDU), until his death President of the Bundestag
