= Offen, Bergen =

Offen
- Ortsteil of Bergen
- Interactive map of Offen
- Location within Germany Location within Lower Saxony
- Coordinates: 52°46′21″N 9°58′46″E
- Country: Germany
- State: Lower Saxony
- District: Celle
- Town: Bergen

Population (2019)
  - Total: 1,019
- Time zone: UTC+01:00 (CET)
  - Summer (DST): UTC+02:00 (CEST)
- Postal codes: 29303
- Dialling codes: 05051

Offen (German pronunciation: [ˈɔfn̩]) is a village administered by the Lower Saxon town of Bergen in the northern part of Celle district on the Lüneburg Heath in North Germany.

== Geography ==
Offen lies about 5.6 kilometres (3.5 mi) south of Bergen on the B 3 federal road and has 1,019 inhabitants (2019). Offen is also responsible for the neighbouring villages of Bollersen and Katensen.

== History ==
Offen was first mentioned in 1336. Until the 19th century it only had 4 farmsteads. However, the agricultural reforms of the 1830s and 40s resulted in many new farm buildings. There was another significant increase in the population to 348 in 1948 after the Second World War, mainly as a result of the influx of refugees. By 1967 it had risen further to 857. In the last decade the local British garrison had new housing estates built within the village for its families.

== Politics and Administration ==
Since the merging of local councils as part of the Lower Saxon administrative reforms of 1971, Offen has been part of the town of Bergen. Offen is represented by a parish council (Ortsrat) and a chair (Ortsbürgermeister). The council is empowered, inter alia, to make decisions about public services in the village, is responsible for maintaining the appearance of the village and for overseeing its clubs and societies, and has to be consulted by the town of Bergen on all important matters affecting the village. It consists of five elected representatives who, together with the chair, sit on the Bergen town council. The parish council elects its own chair. The current incumbent is Cord Otte.

== Literature ==
- Anneliese Degener: Offen, mein Heimatdorf, Skript 1951/52
