= Treppenspeicher =

A Treppenspeicher (literally "staircase store") is the German term for a granary or secondary farm building used for storage and is typical of the Lüneburg Heath area in northern Germany. The upper storey of the store was usually accessed via a flight of steps on the outside of the building, usually at one of the gable ends, thus giving the building its name.

== Description ==
Treppenspeicher are only relatively small buildings. They are witness to the craftsmanship of carpenters in the farming community. Their solid, wooden construction ensured that the interior stayed dry and they were so tightly planked that the stored produce was protected from mice. These stores used to be built within sight but at a distance from the main farmhouse. This ensured that, if the farmhouse caught fire, the fire would not spread to the stores. They were often used as sleeping accommodation for farm hands.

Treppenspeicher were typical of the Lüneburg Heath. Here they remained in use until well into the 19th century. They increasingly disappeared however because they are no longer practical today. Nowadays the storerooms are normally part of the farmhouse itself.

In former times there was at least one, but usually several, stores on each heath farm, serving all sorts of purposes. They were used to store grain, buckwheat, flax, cotton, linen, wool, honey, meat, bacon, and clothes. They were often used as sleeping accommodations for the farmhands.

== Surviving Treppenspeicher ==
Today, Treppenspeicher may be visited at the following places on the Lüneberg Heath:

- Lutterloh
- Hermannsburg Local History Museum
- Schröershof and Schäferhof Farms in Neuenkirchen
- Stimbekhof Farm in Oberhaverbeck
- Peetshof Farm in Wietzendorf
- De Theeshof Local History Museum in Schneverdingen

== Gallery ==
Old Treppenspeicher on the Lüneburg Heath

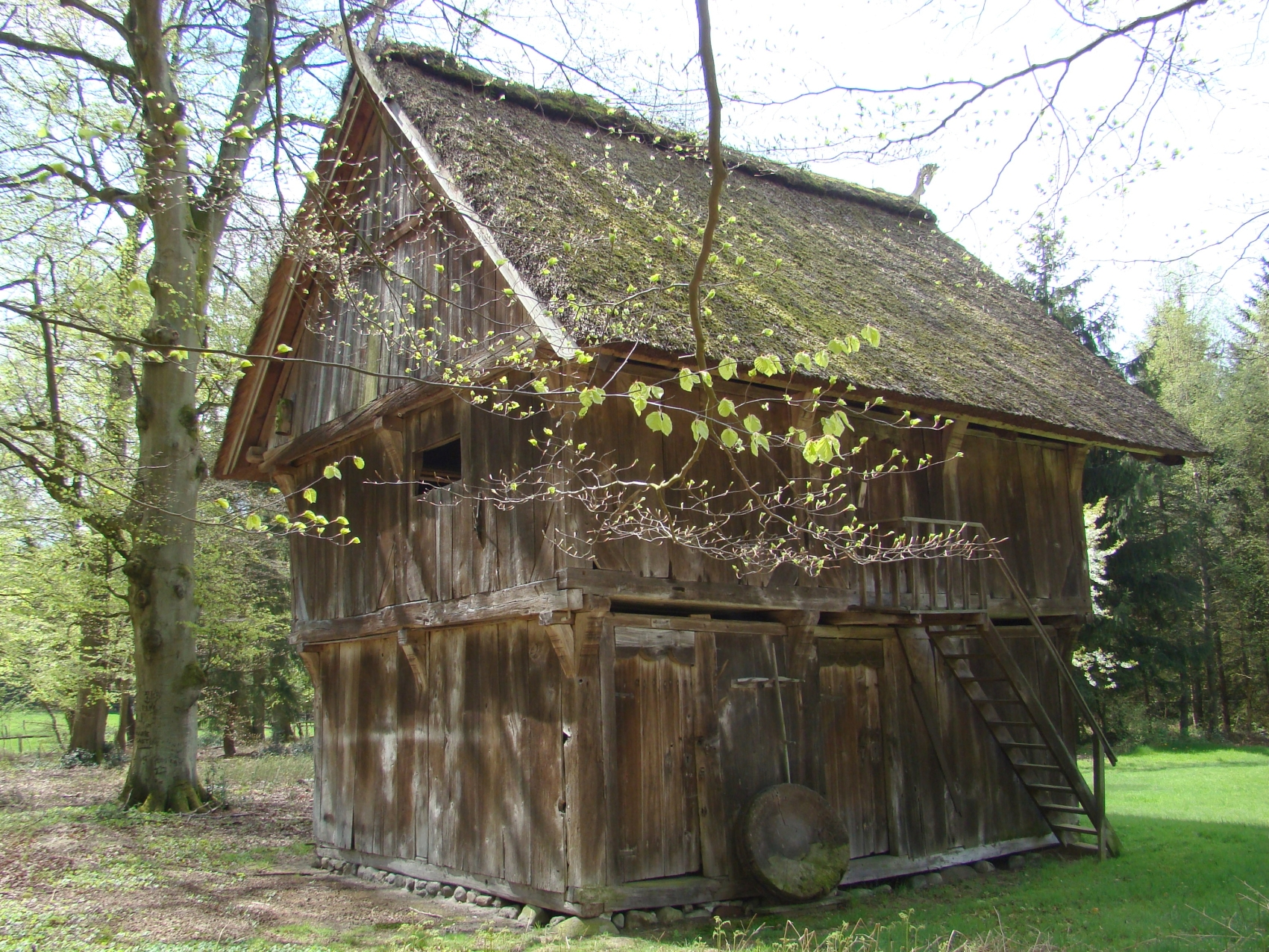
400-year-old Treppenspeicher on the Hiesterhof

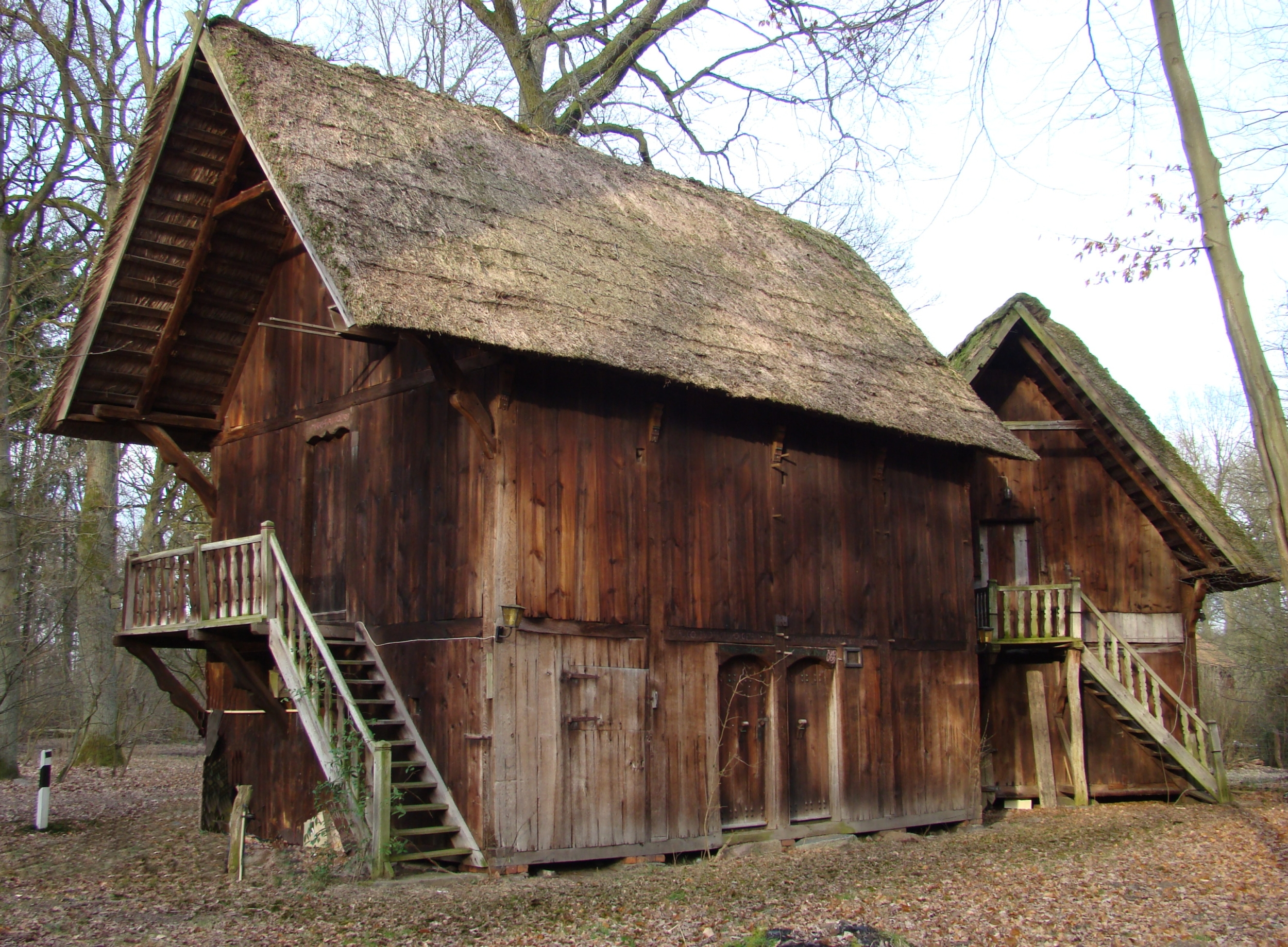
1709 Treppenspeicher in Oberohe

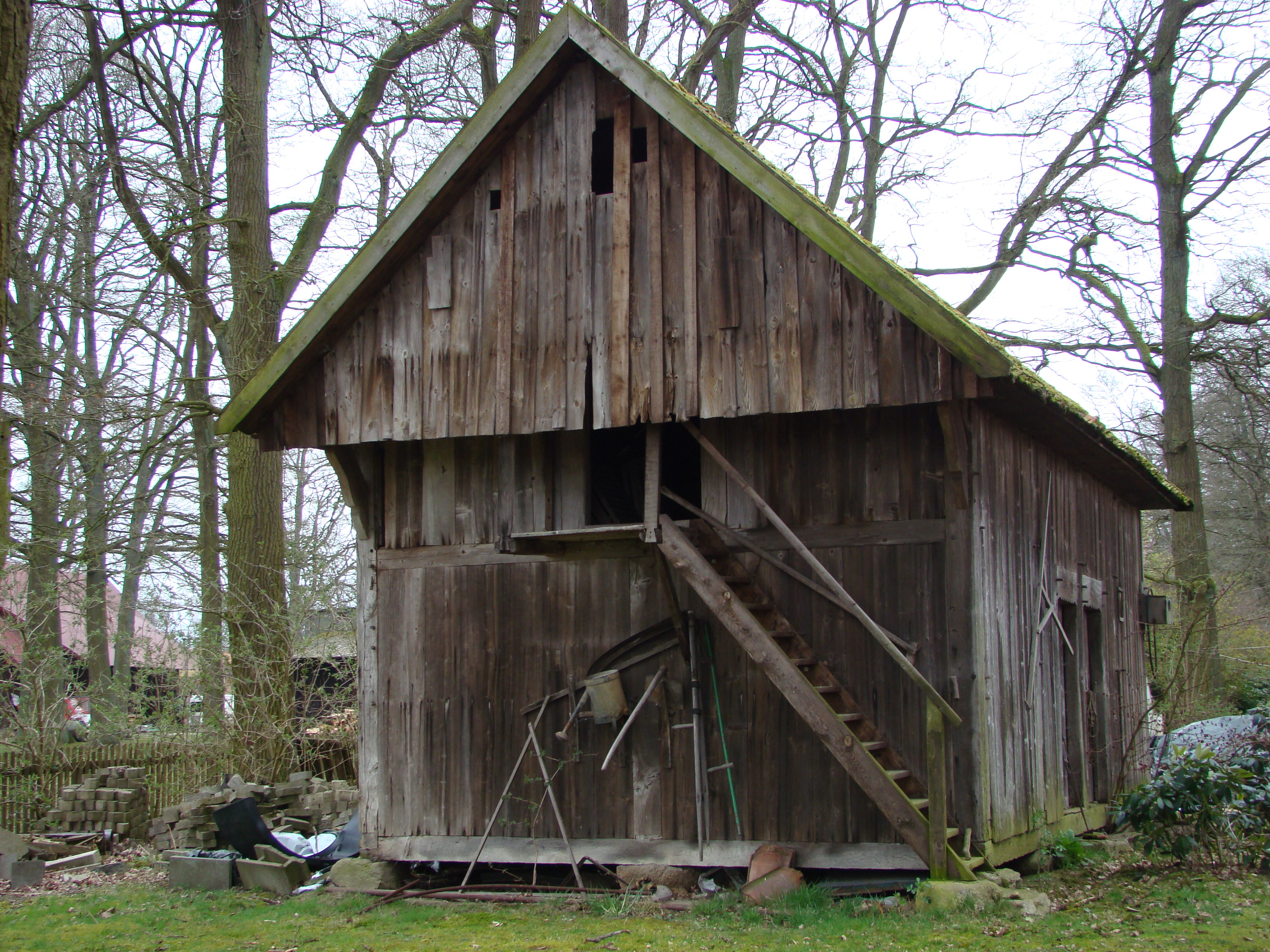
1767 Treppenspeicher in Baven

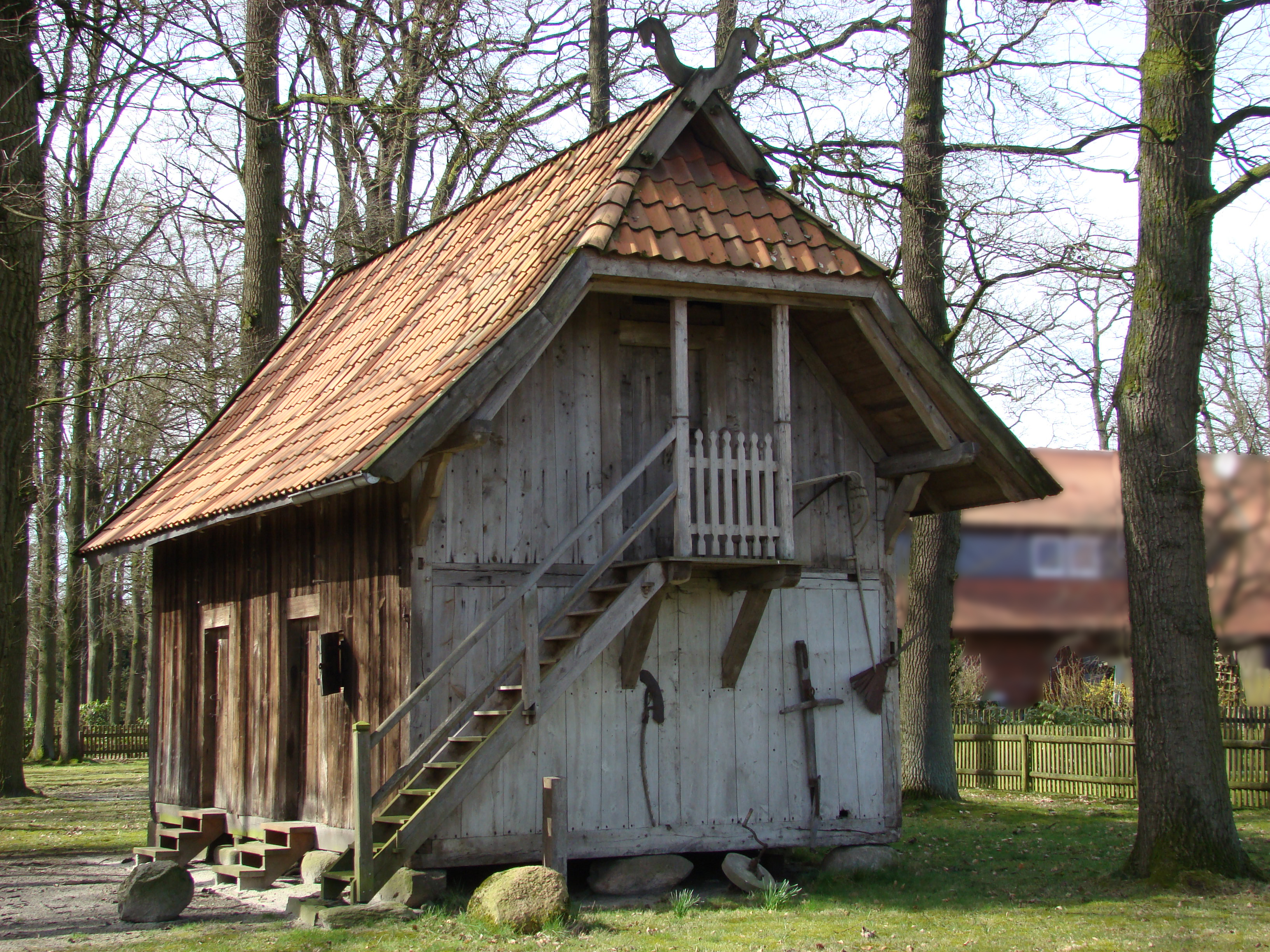
1808 Treppenspeicher in Weesen

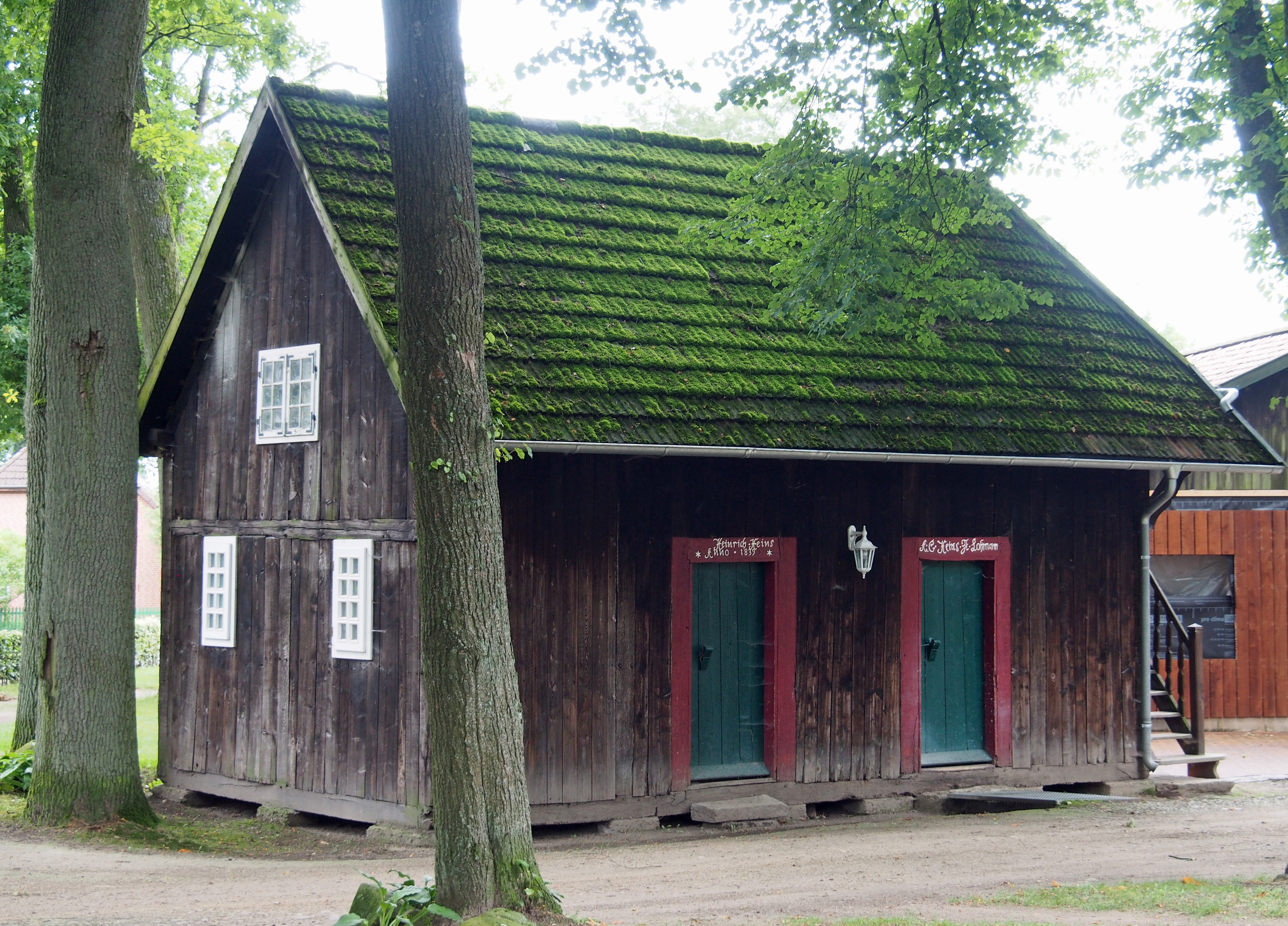
Protected 1839 Treppenspeicher in Bollersen (Celle county)

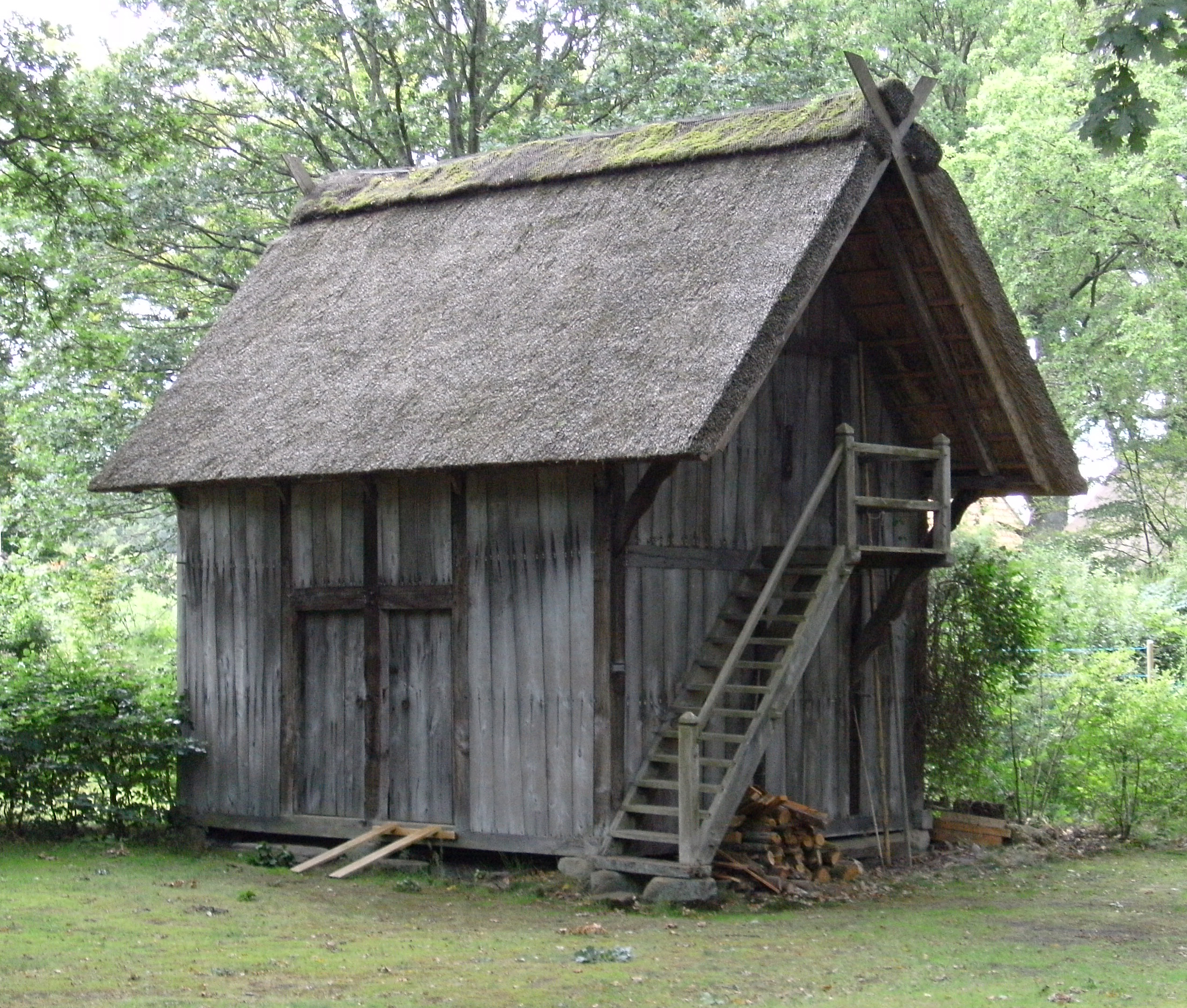
Treppenspeicher in Wilsede

== Bibliography ==
- Eitzen, Gerhard (2006). Bauernhausforschung in Deutschland: gesammelte Aufsätze 1938 bis 1980. PD-Verlag.
- Stuhrwohldt, Alfred (1936). Die Treppenspeicher in der Lüneburger Heide, Brunswick: TH Carola-Wilhelmina.
