= Hartem =

Village in Lower Saxony, Germany

Coordinates: 52°49′26″N 9°43′35″E

Hartem was a village in the Heidmark, an area within the Lüneburg Heath in Lower Saxony, Germany. In 1935/1936 Hartem disappeared from the map. The German armed forces, the Wehrmacht established a military training area (today the largest of its kind in Europe, the Bergen-Hohne Training Area). Its inhabitants were resettled.

== History ==
The name Hartem is derived from "Hartmar". At one time this was the name given to the eldest member of a family or clan. Hartem had been an agriculturally based village since the 12th century. Its main source of income until the 19th century was sheep farming of the Heidschnucke moorland sheep.

At the time of their resettlement there were 123 inhabitants in Hartem.

== Literature ==
- Hinrich Baumann: Die Heidmark - Wandel einer Landschaft. 2006
- Hans Stuhlmacher: Die Heidmark. Schneheide 1939
