= Großes Moor (near Becklingen) =

Nature reserve in Germany

Coordinates: 52°52′06″N 09°57′20″E

Location of the nature reserve

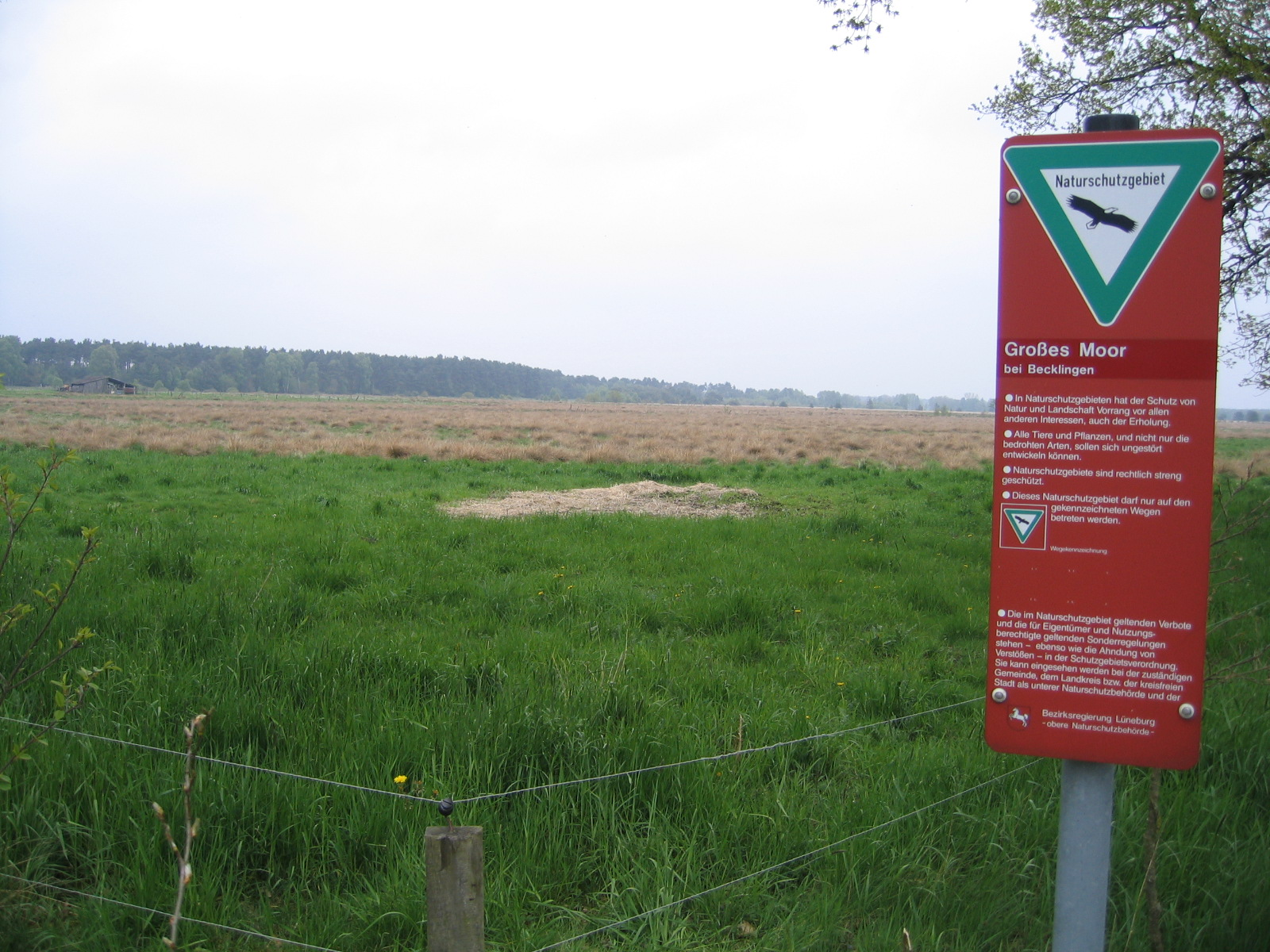
Looking over the Großes Moor towards Tannensieksberg.

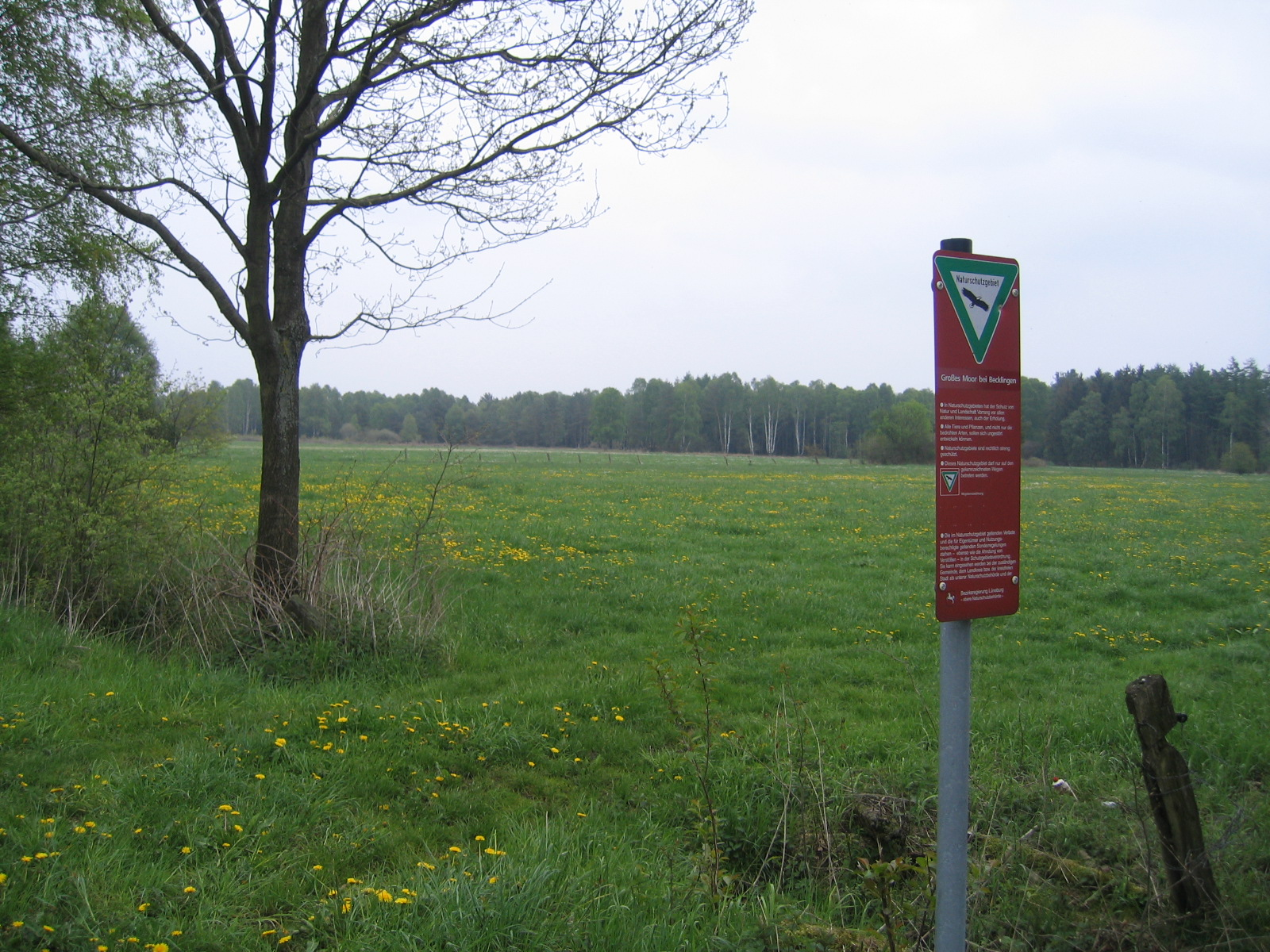
Looking over the Großes Moor towards the wooded heath near its centre.

The Großes Moor near Becklingen (German: Großes Moor bei Becklingen) is a nature reserve in Germany with an area of 850 hectares (2,100 acres), of which 666 hectares (1,650 acres) lie in Celle district and 184 hectares (450 acres) in Soltau-Fallingbostel district. Since 16 December 1985 the area has been protected under conservation law. An area of 776.6 hectares (1,919 acres) is designated as a special area of conservation (FFH-Gebiet). The name literally means "Large Bog near Becklingen" and it lies on the Lüneburg Heath, south of Wietzendorf and east of Becklingen, part of the borough of Bergen. The River Meiße has its source in this raised bog.

== Development ==
The original bog had been drained since the 1950s and largely converted to grassland in order to establish small rural settlements here. Since then the state of Lower Saxony has purchased large areas. Through water retention measures it is intended that the original bog landscape can be recreated. Problems are being caused, though, by cultivated blueberries and black cherries, neophytes that have become widespread across the area.

== Fauna ==
As a result of its seclusion the bog provides an important habitat for the very rare black grouse which is threatened by extinction. Together with the neighbouring and largely contiguous areas around the Munster and Bergen-Hohne Training Areas, the Lüneburg Heath Nature Reserve, the Schießplatz Unterlüß the firm of Rheinmetall and the Großen Heide near Unterlüß, the Kiehnmoor and Brambostel Moor, the bogs near Sittensen, the Ostenholz Moor, the Meißendorf Lakes and the Bannetzer Moor this part of the Lüneburg Heath provides a home to the largest single community of black grouse in the North German Plain.
