= Meiße =

River in Germany

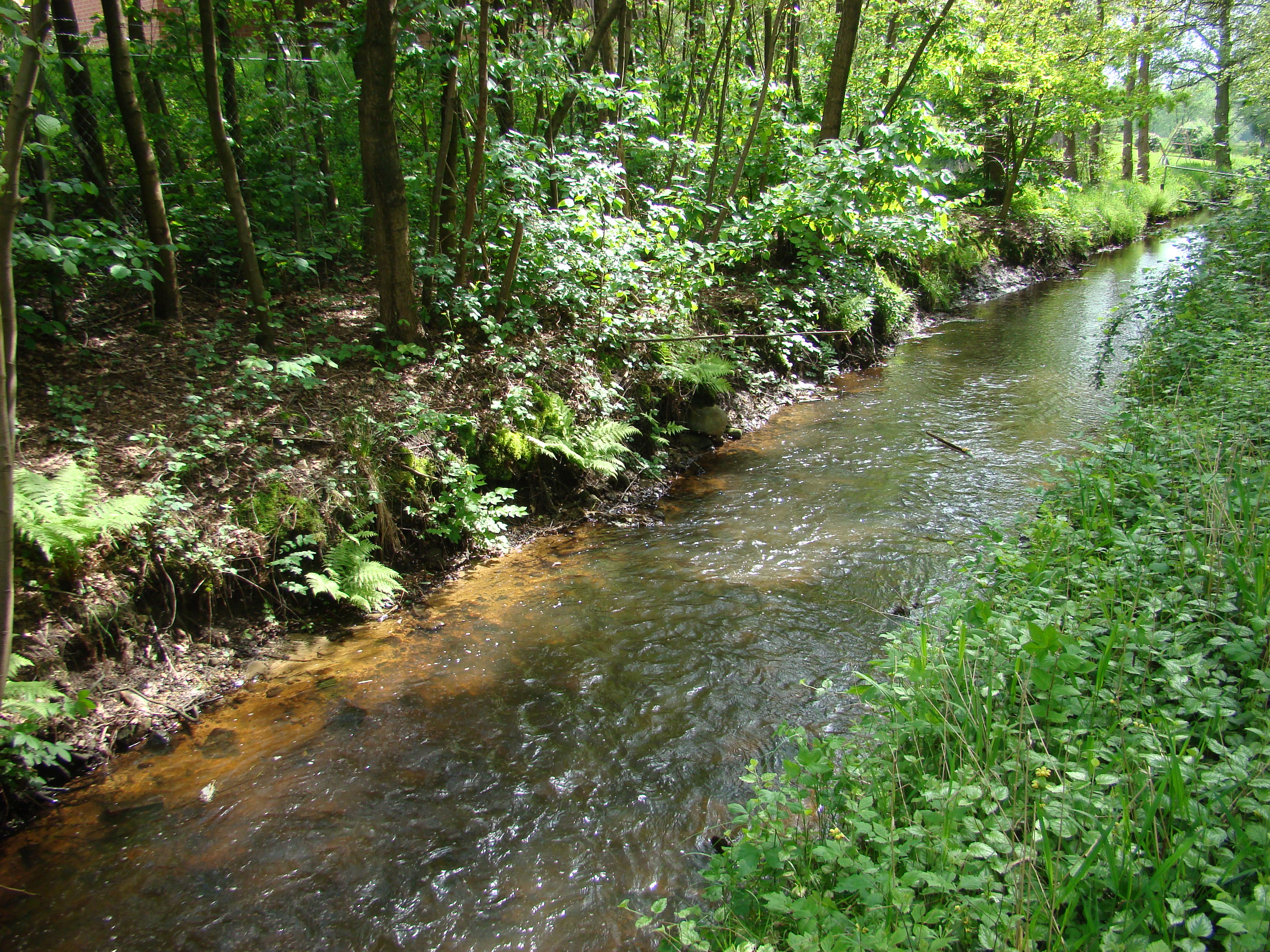
- The Meiße near Bleckmar

Location
- Country: Germany
- State: Lower Saxony

Physical characteristics
- Source
  - location: South of Wietzendorf in the Großes Moor (near Becklingen) nature reserve
  - coordinates: 52°51′30″N 9°57′39″E
  - elevation: 73 m above sea level (NN)
- Mouth
  - location: South of Hodenhagen into the Aller
  - coordinates: 52°45′34″N 9°34′59″E
  - elevation: 21 m above sea level (NN)
- Length: 40.4 km (25.1 mi)
- Basin size: 265 km^{2} (102 sq mi)

Basin features
- Progression: Aller→ Weser→ North Sea
- Landmarks: Villages: Bleckmar, Hasselhorst (part of Lohheide), Belsen, Hörsten (part of Lohheide), Gudehausen (part of Lohheide), Hartmannshausen (part of Lohheide), Meißendorf, Hodenhagen
- Tributaries
  - left: Berger Bach, Geltteichsgraben, Bruchgraben
  - right: Mühlenbach, Liethbach (confluence of Forellenbach and Schwemmbeck), Meierbach, Hohe Bach, Brummbeeke (confluence of Prahlbeeke and Krusenhäusener Bach)

Meiße (German pronunciation: [ˈmaɪsə]) is a river of Lower Saxony, Germany that flows through part of the Lüneburg Heath. It is a right-hand tributary of the Aller.

== Origin and course ==
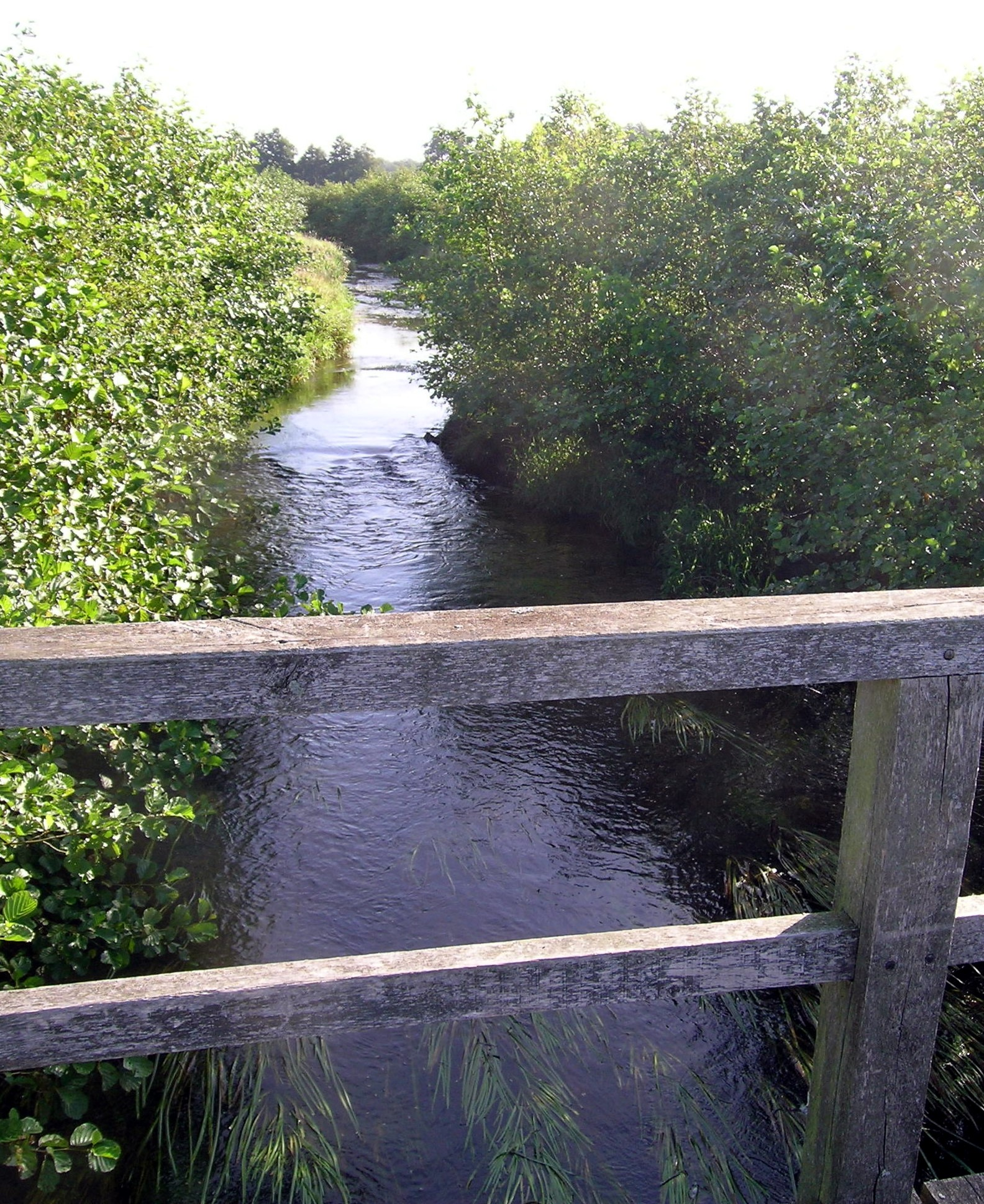
The renaturalised Meiße near the Meißendorf Lakes

The Meiße rises south of Wietzendorf in the nature reserve of Großes Moor (near Becklingen). Originally the upper course of the upper Wietze (Örtze) was the headstream of the Meiße before the Großes Moor diverted the Wietze into the River Örtze at a point south of the sharp bend in the river near Wietzendorf as a result of headward erosion. The Meiße flows through the villages of Bleckmar, Hasselhorst (in the unincorporated area of Lohheide on the Bergen-Hohne Training Area), Belsen, Hörsten, Gudehausen and Hartmannshausen (all three also belonging to Lohheide), as well as Meißendorf, and discharges into the Aller south of Hodenhagen after about 41 kilometres (25 mi).

Its left-hand tributary streams are the Berger Bach, which flows through the town of Bergen and joins the Meiße near Belsen, and the small Geltteichsgraben and Bruchbach, which originate in the Meißendorf Lakes.

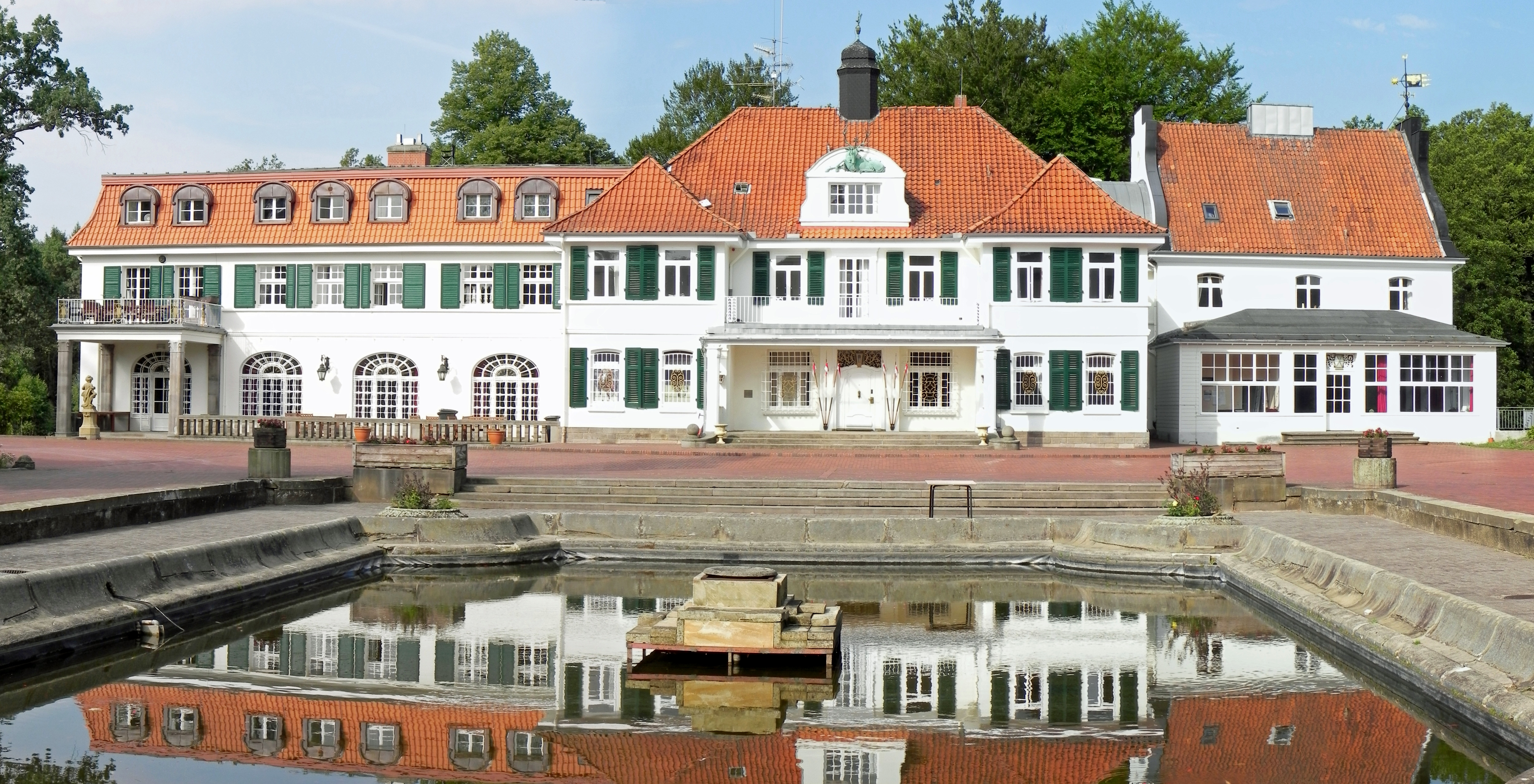
Schloss Bredebeck

The right-hand feeder streams of the Meiße are: the little Mühlenbach near Bleckmar and the Liethbach, which arises near Bredebeck (in Lohheide) from the confluence of the Forellenbach and Schwemmbeck. On the Liethbach is Schloss Bredebeck, a former manor house, once part of the British base of Hohne Station. The building was used as an officers' mess and has been used as lodgings for the British royal family in the past. The Meierbach, which emerges in the Bergen-Hohne Training Area, flows through the Meiersee and discharges into the Meiße shortly before Hodenhagen. The Hohe Bach also starts in the military training area, flows past the Sieben Steinhäuser and also joins the Meiße shortly before Hodenhagen. Before the Meiße reaches the Aller it branches again into the Hudemühlener Meiße.

Near the Autobahn services of Ostenholzer Moor (A7, E 45), a canal known as the Esseler Kanal crosses the Meiße. This is made up of the Nordkanal and Südkanal, each of which drains the Ostenholz Moor. The Meiße mainly has water quality of Class II i.e. only moderately polluted.

== History ==
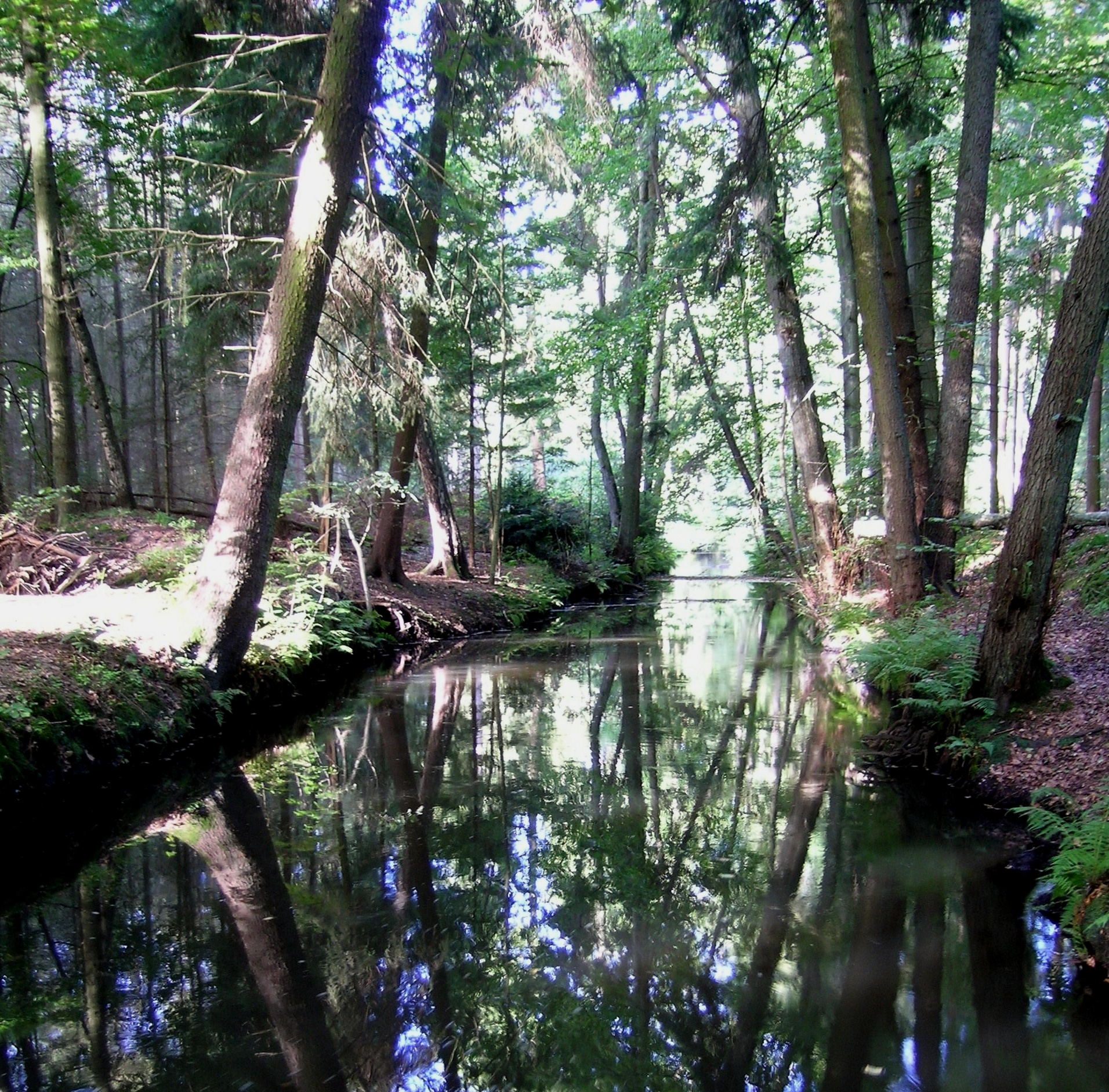
The Meiße near the manor house of Gut Sunder, straightened and deepened

As early as 1881 work began on the Sunder Estate (Gut Sunder) to deepen and impound the Meiße in order to create ponds for fish-farming. Over the course of time, fish ponds were established over an area of 250 hectares (620 acres). Today these form part of the Meißendorf Lakes and Bannetze Moor nature reserve. Until the 1970s there was also a watermill and sawmill here. In the surrounding area ponds were created covering a further 250 hectares. Near Gudehausen (in the unincorporated area of Lohheide) the Herrengraben ditch was dug which supplied many of the ponds with water. In 1998 Celle district began to renaturalise parts of the Meiße again. To the northwest of Sunder Manor House the old course of the Meiße has been largely re-established.

== See also ==
- List of rivers of Lower Saxony
