= Bleckmar =

- Ortsteil of Bergen
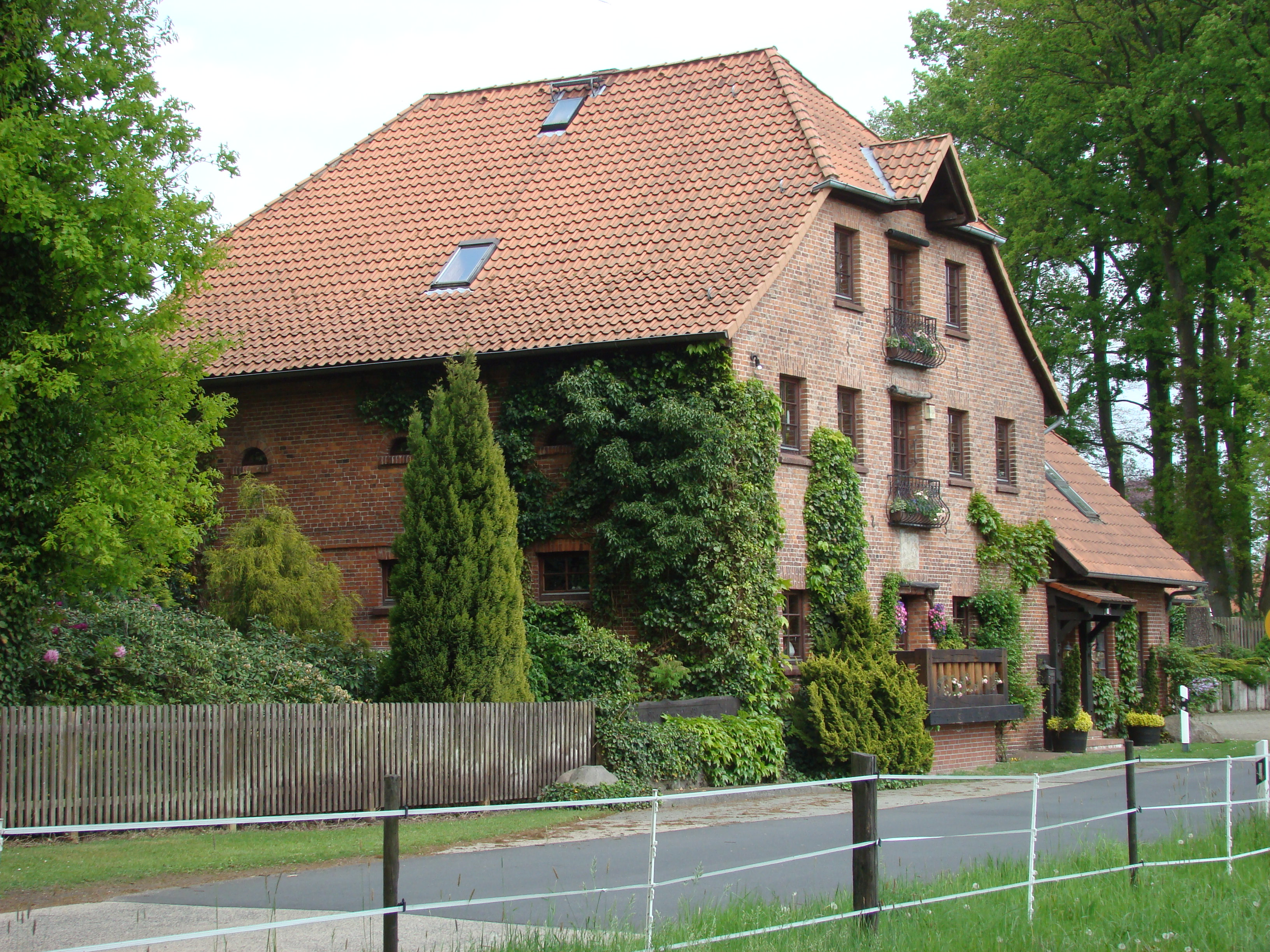
- Restored water mill

- Coat of arms
- Interactive map of Bleckmar
- Location within Germany Location within Lower Saxony
- Coordinates: 52°49′51″N 09°56′04″E
- Country: Germany
- State: Lower Saxony
- District: Celle
- Town: Bergen

Population (2019)
  - Total: 464
- Time zone: UTC+01:00 (CET)
  - Summer (DST): UTC+02:00 (CEST)
- Postal codes: 29303
- Dialling codes: 05051

Bleckmar (German pronunciation: [ˈblɛkmaʁ]) is a village administered by the Lower Saxon town of Bergen in the northern part of Celle district on the Lüneburg Heath in North Germany. It lies about 3 kilometres (1.9 mi) north of Bergen on the B 3 federal road and has 464 inhabitants (2019). It is administratively responsible for the neighbouring hamlet of Dageförde.

== History ==
Bleckmar was first mentioned in the records in 866 under the name of Blecmeri. This farming village originally grew from two farms, but by 1820 it had a population of 150. This number grew to over 300 inhabitants in 1900. In 1910 Bleckmar was given a railway halt on the Celle–Soltau railway which now ran through the village. Street names were not introduced in Bleckmar until 2001 after the majority of inhabitants voted in favour of them. The River Meiße, which flows in a north–south direction through Bleckmar, was dammed to form a pond here used to power a corn mill. The old mill building has now been restored and converted into a residential property.

Dageförde is a small farm hamlet where there are timber-framed farmhouses with ornate decorations, as well as typical heathland barns - the Treppenspeicher - from the 18th century.

== Politics ==
Since the merging of local councils as part of the Lower Saxon administrative reforms of 1971, Bleckmar has been part of the town of Bergen. Bleckmar is represented by a parish council (Ortsrat) and a chairman (Ortsbürgermeister). The council is empowered, inter alia, to make decisions about public services in the village, is responsible for maintaining the appearance of the village and for overseeing its clubs and societies, and has to be consulted by the town of Bergen on all important matters affecting the village. It consists of five elected representatives who, together with the mayor, sit on the Bergen town council. The parish council elects its own mayor. The current incumbent is Elisabeth Tasto-Iseken.

== Mission work ==
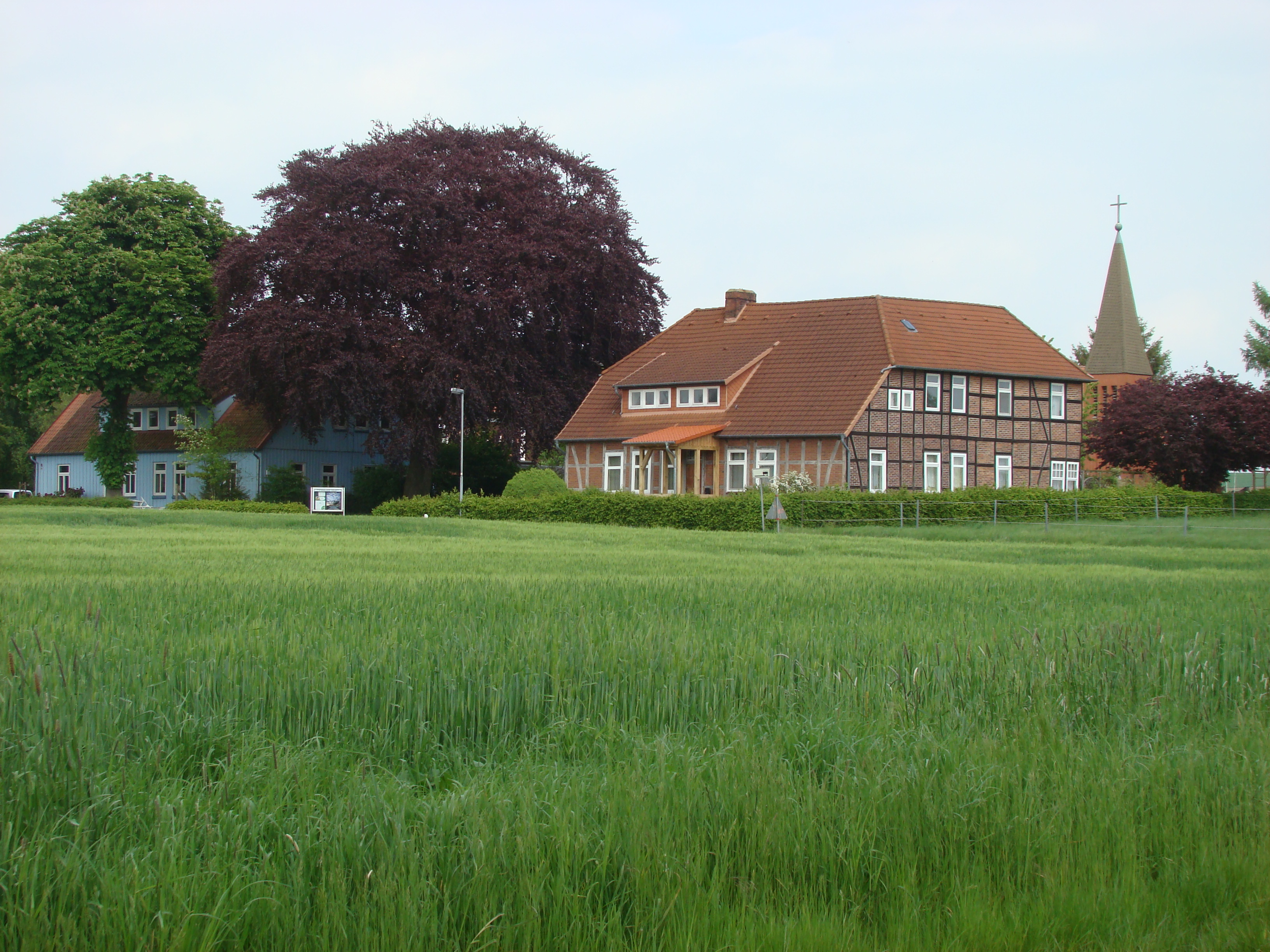
Lutheran Church Mission, vicarage and St. John's Church

Since 1892 there has been a Lutheran church mission in Bergen-Bleckmar. The Independent Evangelical-Lutheran Church (SELK) is the sponsor of this mission. Mission work is led by the current head of mission, Markus Nietzke. It has sent missionaries in South Africa, Botswana, Brazil, Australia and Germany. It has its own seminary in which missionaries are trained.

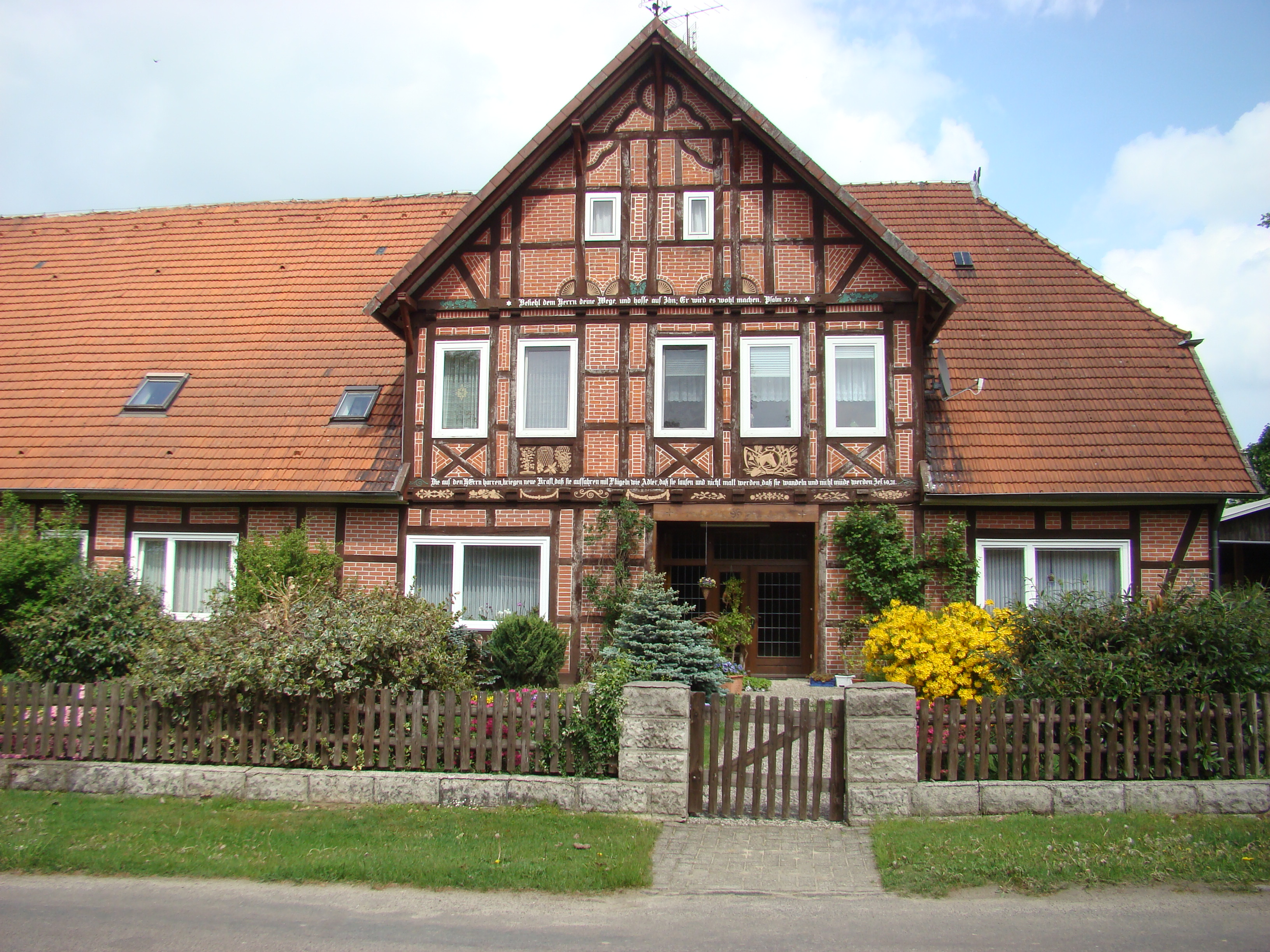
Farmhouse in Dageförde

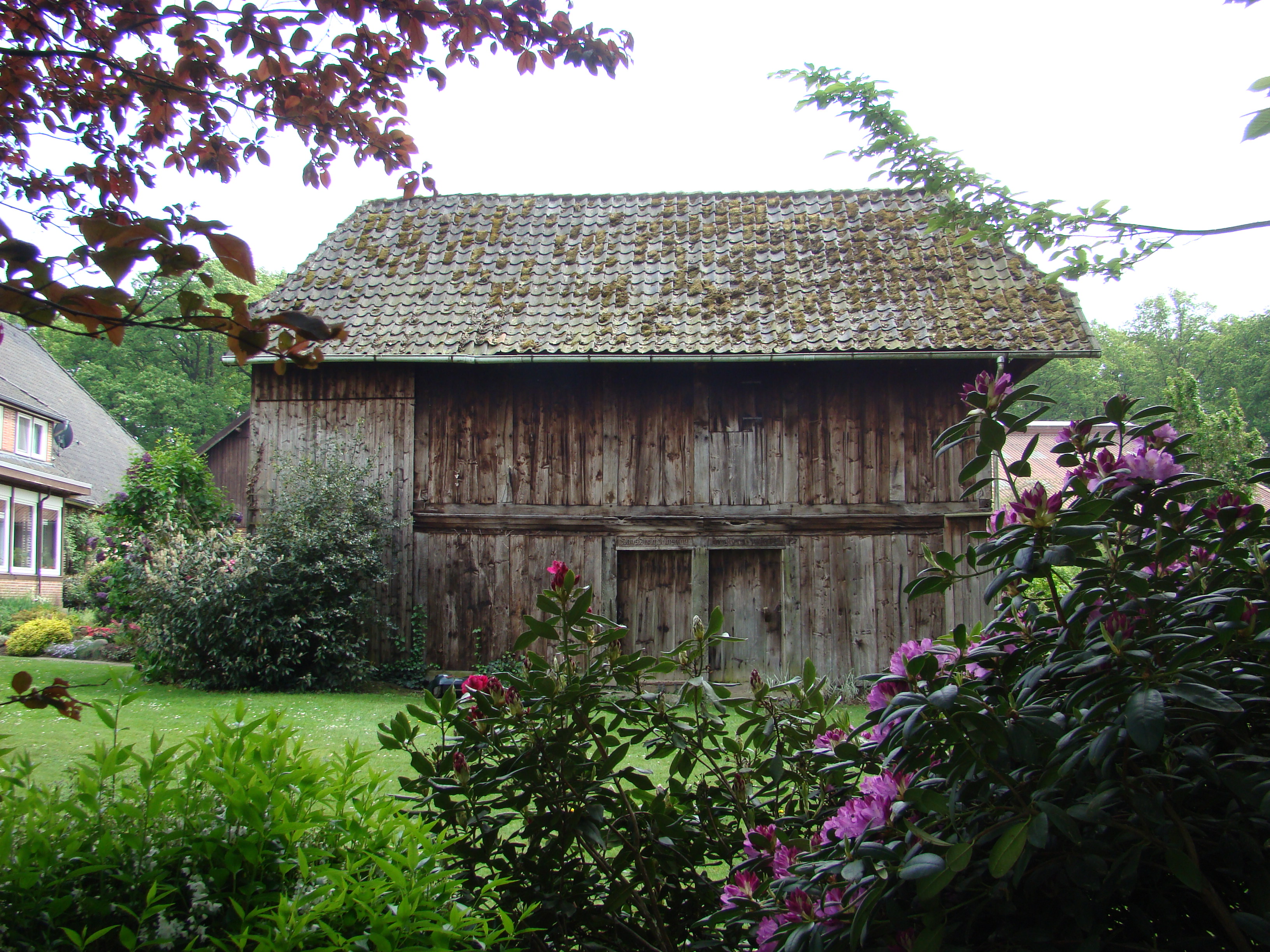
Treppenspeicher barn in Dageförde, from the 18th century

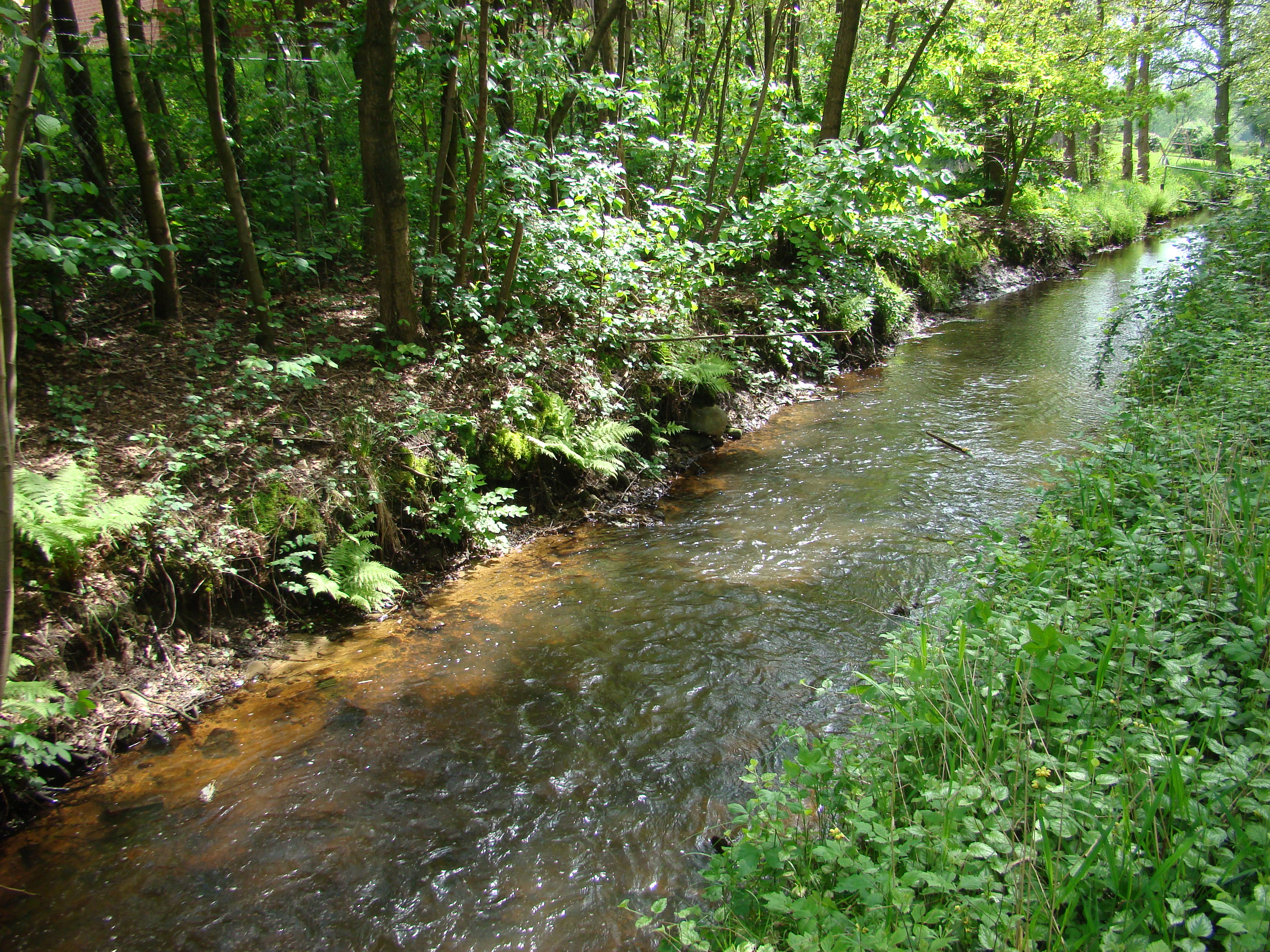
The River Meiße near Bleckmar

== Literature ==
- Alfred Keseberg u. a.: Festschrift der Gemeinde Bleckmar zu ihrer 1.100-Jahr-Feier Bleckmar 1966
- Markus Nietzke: Ein Missionshaus in Bleckmar!? Heimatkalender. Jahrbuch für die Lüneburger Heide 2007.
