= Schloss Bredebeck =

Coordinates: 52°47′14″N 9°53′25″E

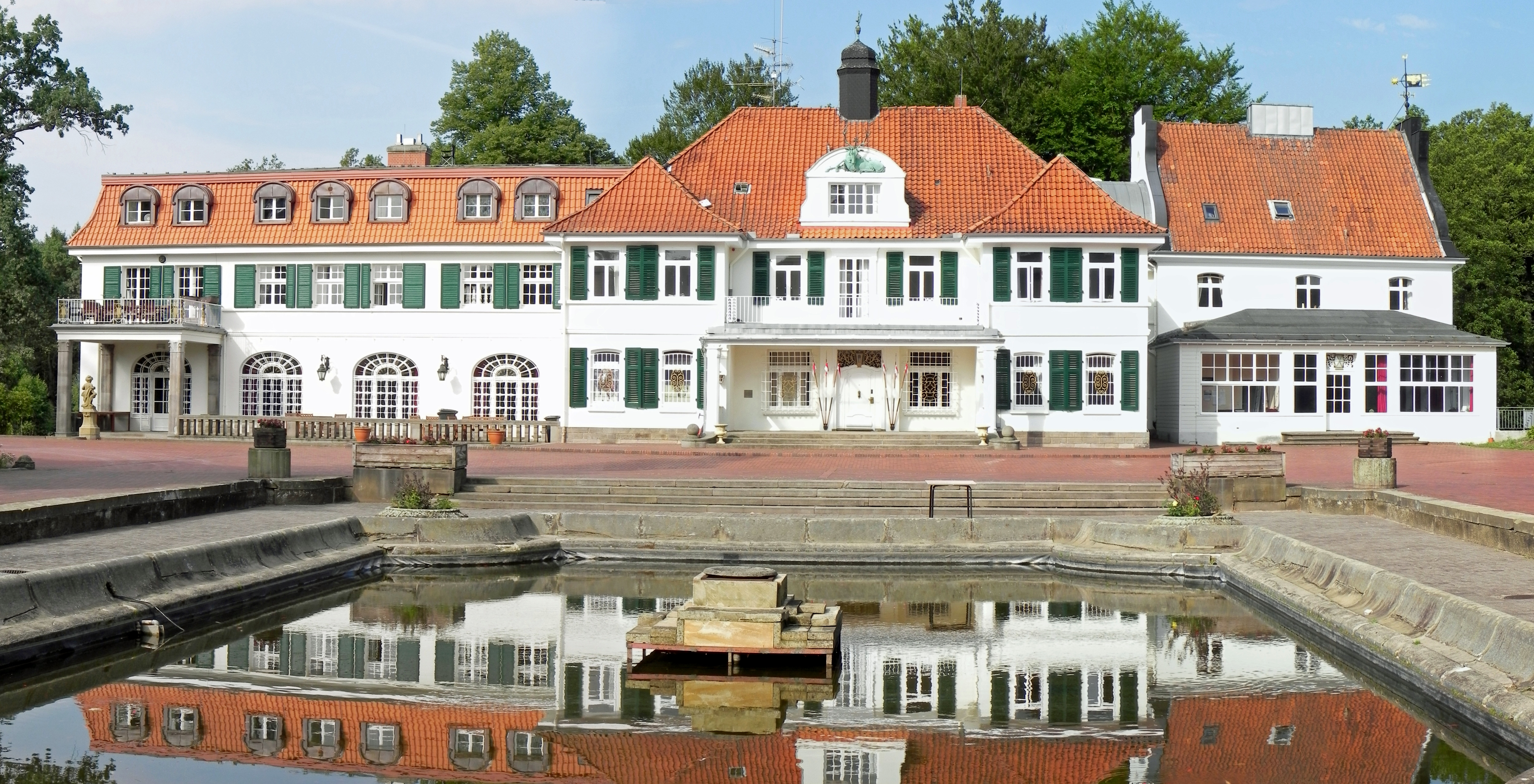
Schloss Bredebeck

Schloss Bredebeck ("Bredebeck House") was built in 1901/1902 by a farmer, Herr Hellberg. It is actually a manor house in terms of its size and function. The house is located in woodland in the German state of Lower Saxony between the former villages of Hörsten and Hohne, which disappeared in the 1930s in the wake of the establishment of Bergen-Hohne Training Area. In 1936, the Bredebeck estate was incorporated into the training area and, since then, has not been accessible to the general public. It became part of the British Army's estate at Bergen-Hohne Garrison.

== History ==
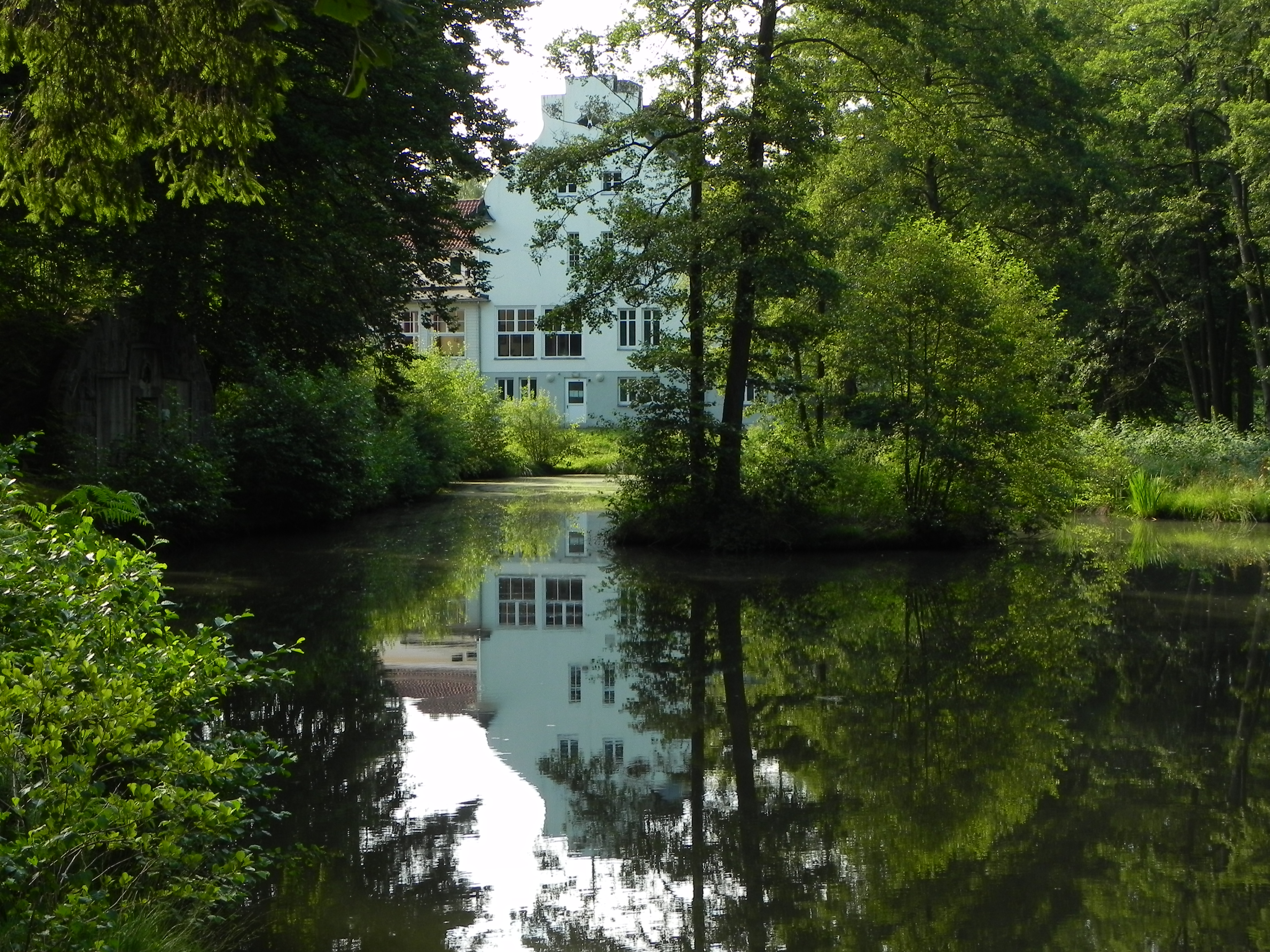
Bredebeck on the far side of the pond

In old documents from 1476 and 1511 the place is referred to as tom Bredtbeck and in 1589 as Bretbeck. There was a stream, the Liethbach, a tributary of the Meiße, that used to exist in the vicinity of the former farm and which led to a large forest called the Breede. Hence the name Bredebeck ("Breede Beck"). In the 1476 document it is recorded that the v. Bothmer brothers (Ernst, Gebhard and Kurt) sold the farm of tom Bredbeck to Heinrich, Otto und Lambert von Dageförde. Later, between 1563 and 1700, farmers with the names Bredbeck, Bredebeck and Bretbeck lived on the farm.

In 1877, the farmer, Gustav Hellberg, abandoned the traditional heath farming typical of the area. He sold his moorland sheep, the Heidschnucken, because neither their wool nor their meat fetched good prices. He switched to sheep fattening, introduced artificial fertilizer, laid out strawberry and asparagus fields and grew fruit trees. He even tried amelioration by digging ditches and sanding the surface of the boggy terrain (so-called Moordammkultur), but with little success.

On 23 November 1909 the farm and manor building were sold for 160,000 Reichsmarks to an Army officer, Major (retired) von Rosen. In 1922, he sold the house in turn to a lawyer, Adolf Kühling. In 1932 the property was transferred to Ernst Kühling. In 1936 the manor was incorporated into the terrain of the then Bergen Military Training Area. From 1945 to 2015 it was an officers' mess belonging to the resident British cavalry regiment, the last unit there being the armoured reconnaissance regiment, the 9th/12th Royal Lancers (Prince of Wales's). Occasionally the British used the mess as a guest house. It was even used as such by the British royal family as accommodation when members of the royal household visit the British Army in Germany. In December 2011, Prince Andrew was invited here. In his capacity as the Colonel-in-Chief of the Regiment, he paid tribute to the soldiers of the Royal Lancers after they had returned in November following a seven-month deployment to Afghanistan. The house was returned to the German government when the British garrison closed in summer 2015.

== Estate ==
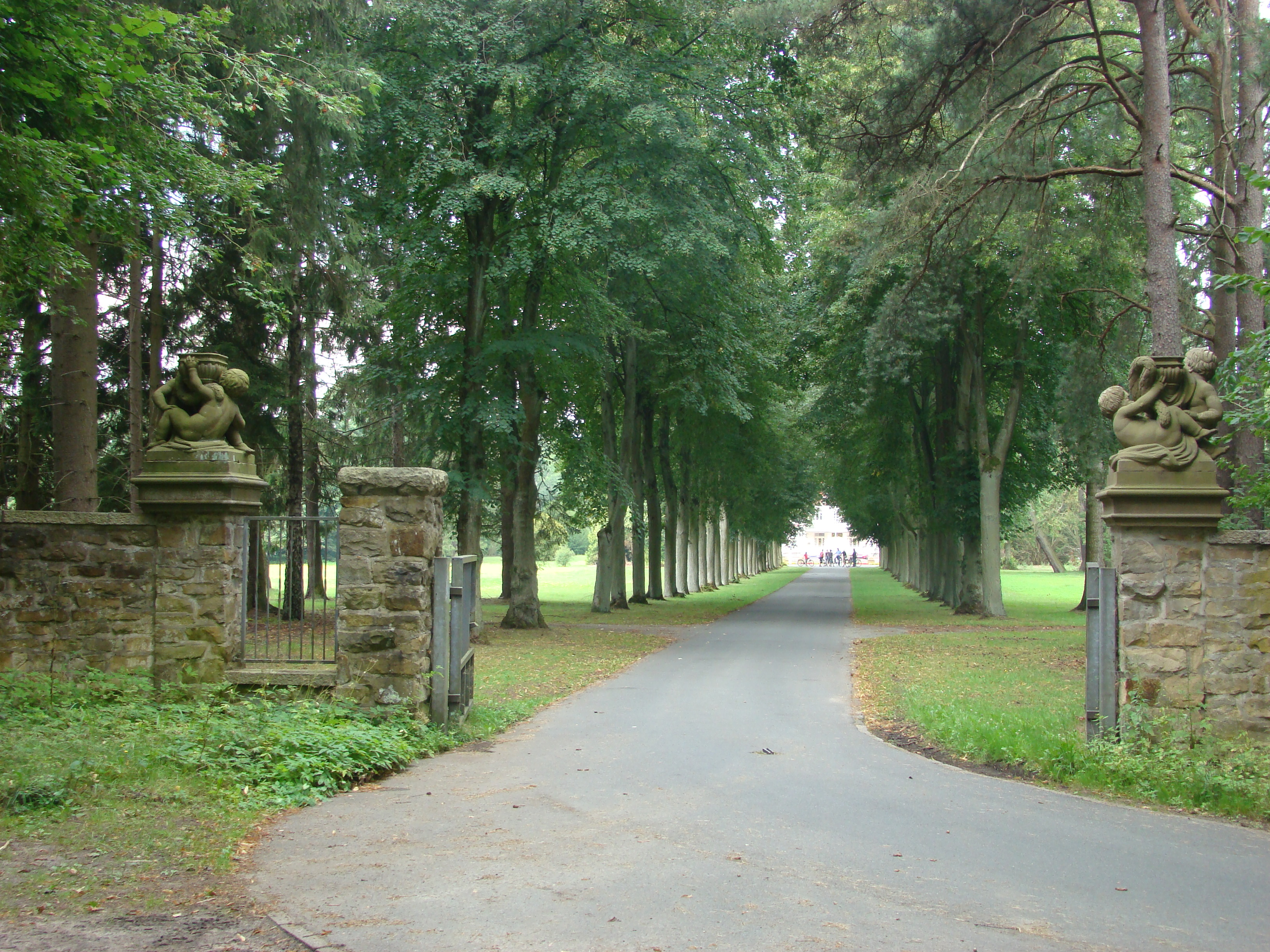
The main entrance of the manor with its lime tree avenue

In Lower Saxony's inventory of listed buildings the manor and its gardens are described in detail in the state they were in 1970. An extract:

A gateway hidden in a dense forest of tall trees and an avenue of limes lead to the very charming estate situated in a forest clearing. The drive swings around a rectangular pond with a fountain and ends in the spacious front courtyard of a in baroque-style manor house dating to 1901/02. The main building, of white painted, plastered masonry, is divided into a corps de logis centred on the main axis of the drive, a south wing to the left that is set back and half the height of the principal block, and a north wing, also set back, that is joined to the main building by a short corridor. All elements are on two levels, [... there is a] baroque-designed entrance hall with stuccoed walls; a framed ceiling mirror with stucco profiles [...] At the rear of the building is a garden room in the Classical style, with an exposed beam ceiling in the style of a Classical entablature and a similarly designed frieze of small corbel figures (Konsölchenfries) at the height of the beams. Three-dimensional ionic columns, in front of the walls and in the four corners of the room, support the beams .... In the left wing is an impressive ballroom, the length of the building. Wall panelling made of almost black stained oak in the shape of fluted columns with composite capitals, [...] On the surface of the stuccoed ceiling is a portrait of St. Hubert's stag in bas-relief. Against the inside wall a stove made of brown and yellow marble; with the year inscription 1926. Parquet flooring. Off the rear of this hall are two smaller rooms: left, the library with built-in bookshelves and glass wall cabinets, ceiling stucco. Right, accessible from the hall, a hall of mirrors in the shapes of the empire; […] The room is kept in white and gold with grey contouring of the details.

— Die Kunstdenkmale des Landkreises Celle. Textband l, Hannover/Osnabrück, 1970/1980, pp. 225 f

== Gardens ==
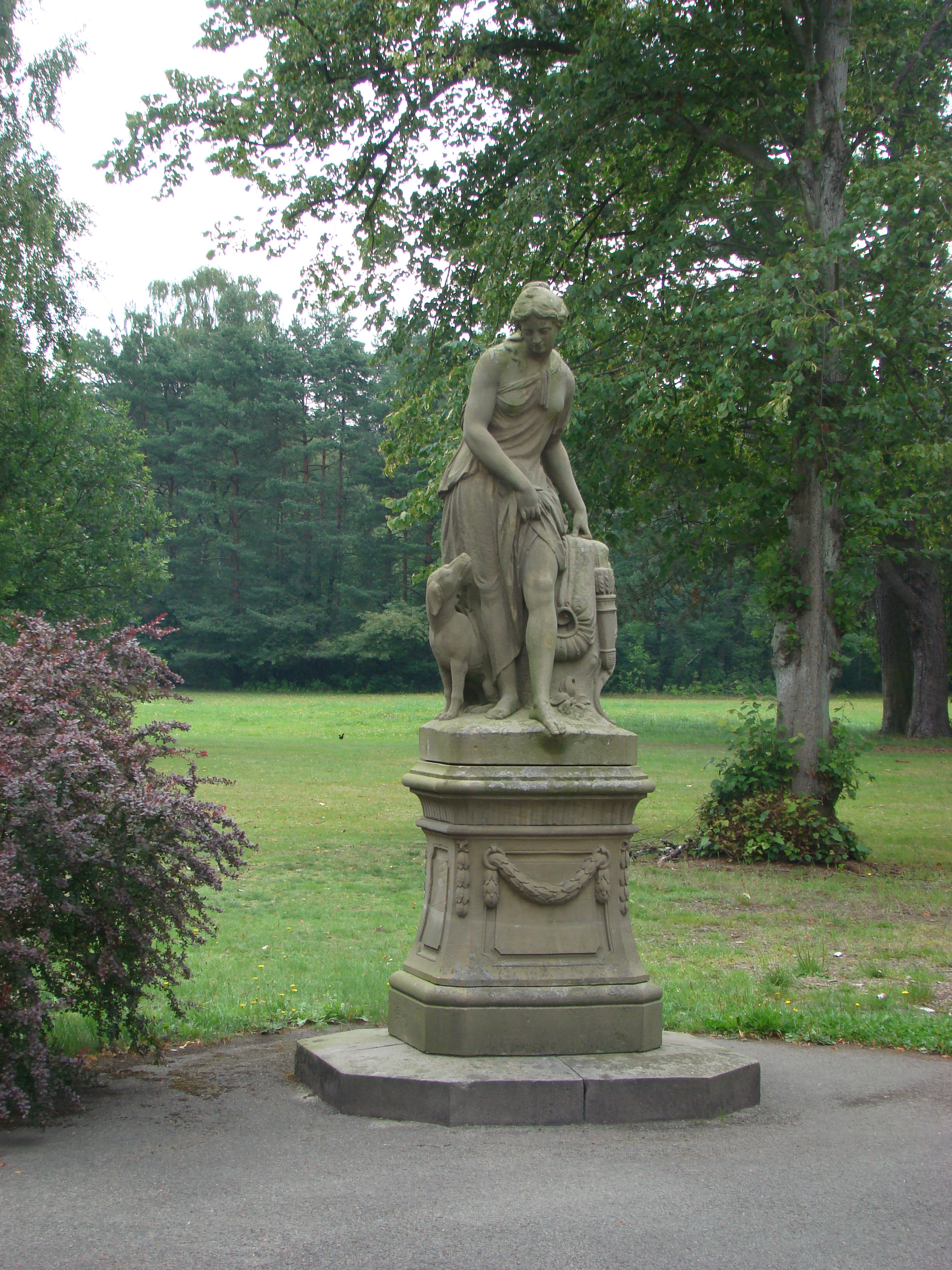
The hunting goddess, Diana, with dog, on a pedestal in the manor gardens

Description of the gardens. Extract from Lower Saxony's inventory of listed buildings (as at 1970):

In front of the corps de logis is a charming parterre in the baroque style. In the centre is a long, rectangular water basin with a fountain base supported by two putti.[…] Around the basin is an ambulatory, to which four steps lead on each of the two shorter sides. On the opposite side of the house is a staircase made of sandstone stringers, on each of which a life-size wild boar's head, a hunting horn, as a hunting accoutrement, and a boar spear, all on drapery, have been carved. [...] The surrounding drive is decorated with statues on pedestals to the left and right of the gateway side; on the one side is the figure of a woman with a sheaf in her arm; on the other is the goddess, Diana, with a bow, a quiver and a hunting dog by her side. To the side of forecourt are low, segment-shaped niches with benches, each flanked by two groups of putti at the ends of the wall sections. Another open staircase lined with groups of putti in front of the left-hand wing leads down to a sunken terrace.

— Die Kunstdenkmale des Landkreises Celle. Textband l, Hannover/Osnabrück 1970/1980, pp. 225 f

Interior rooms

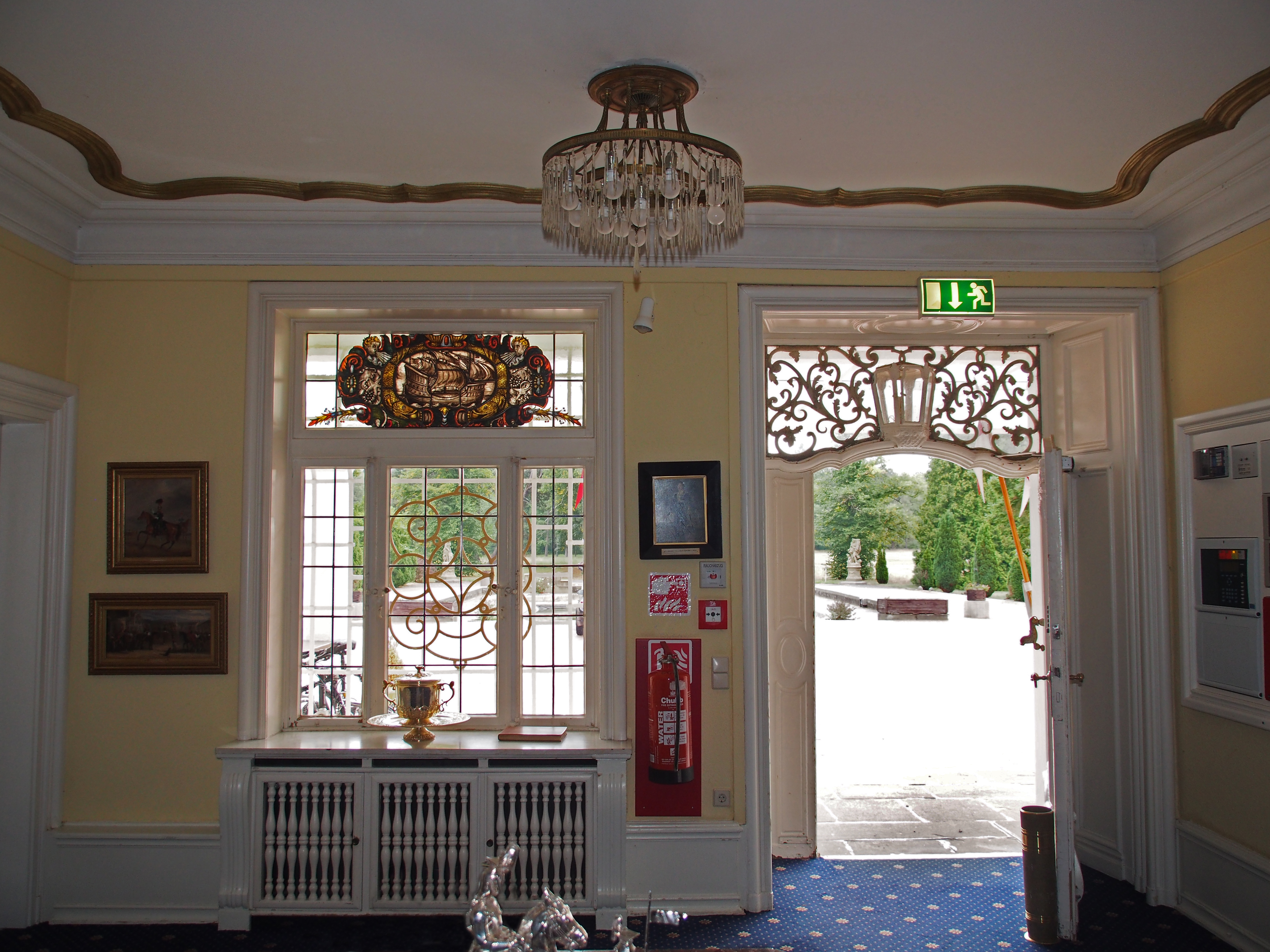
Foyer

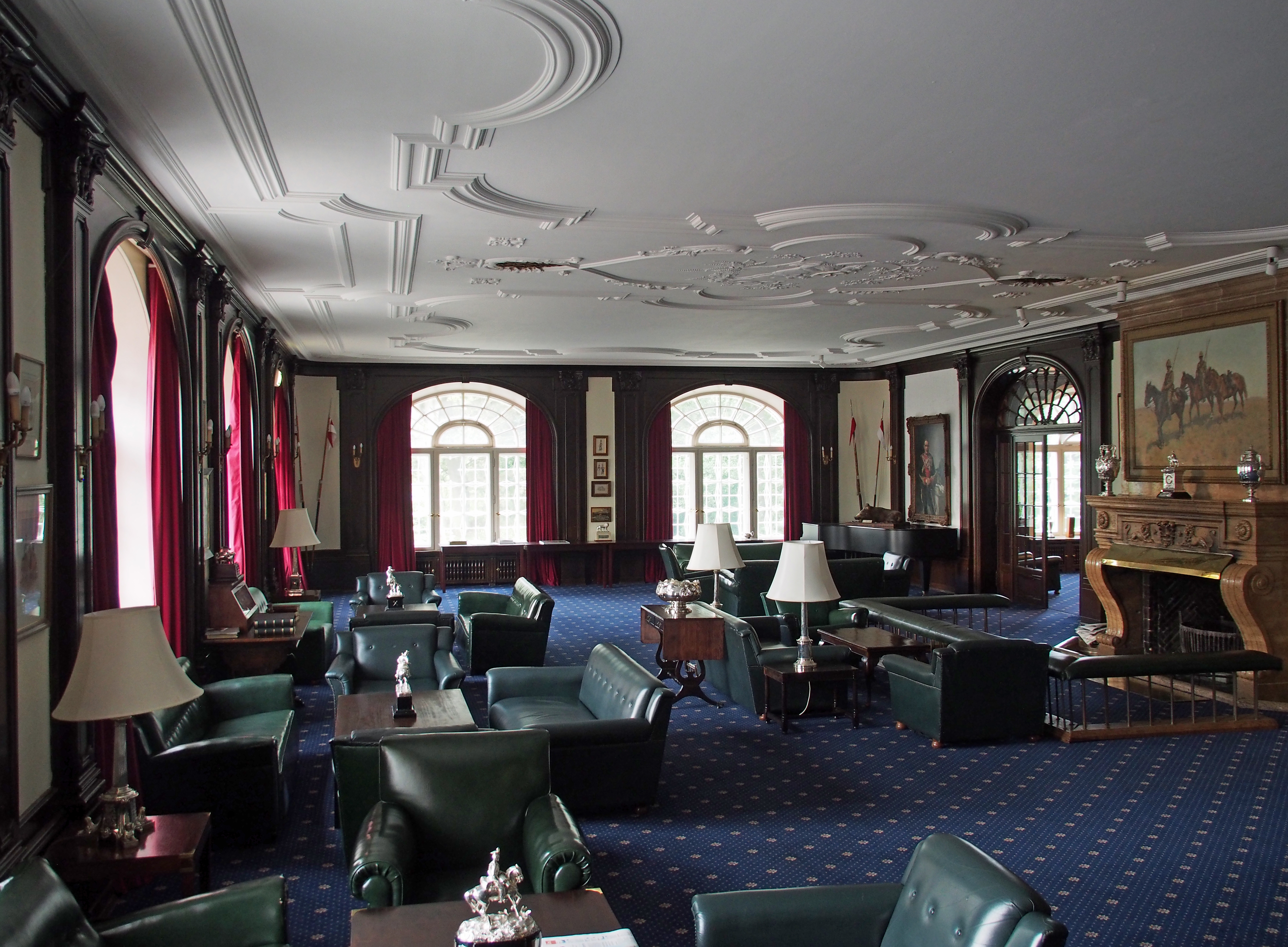
The Great Hall (Großer Saal) with its stuccoed ceiling and marble stove

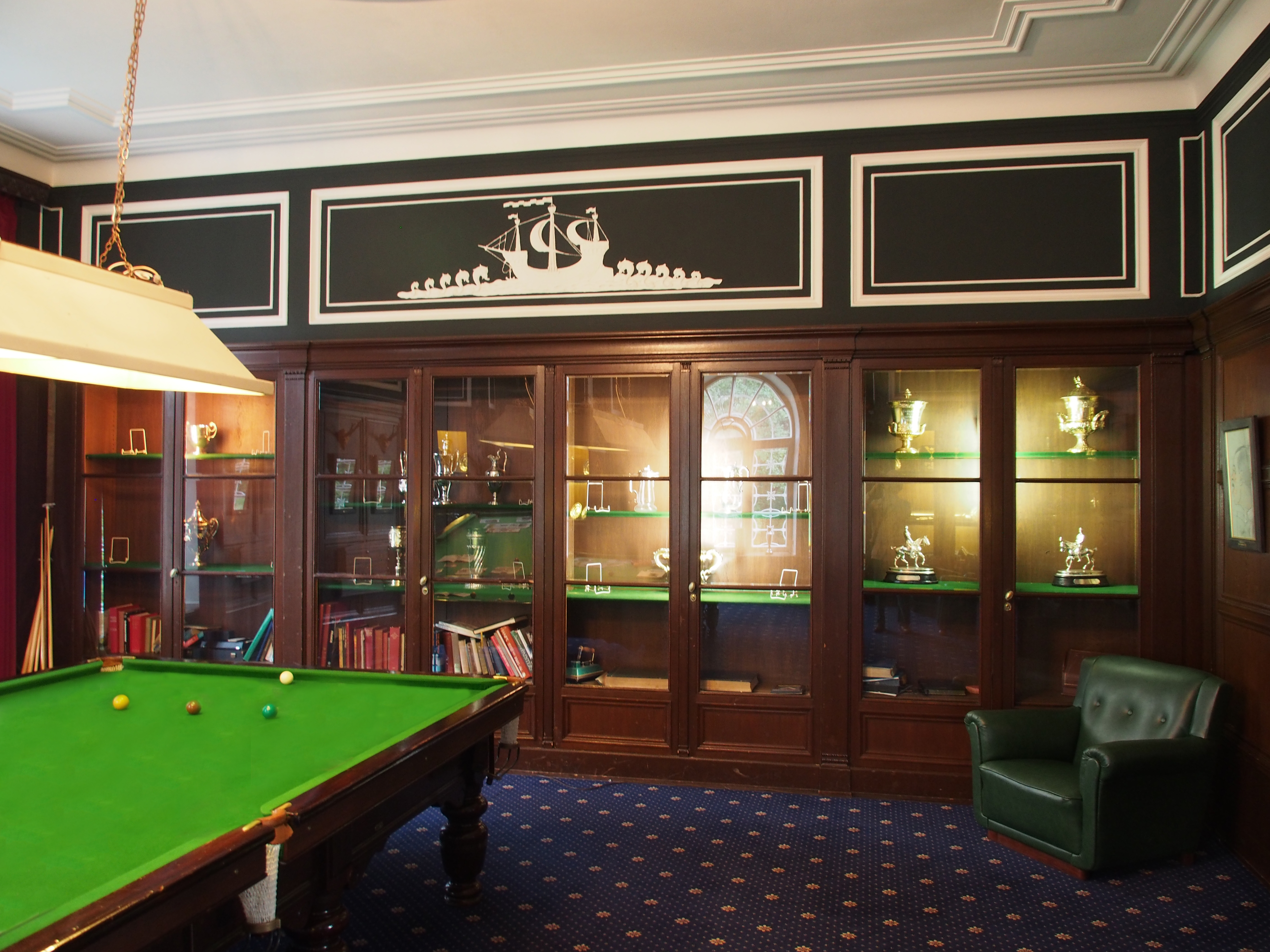
Library and billiard table

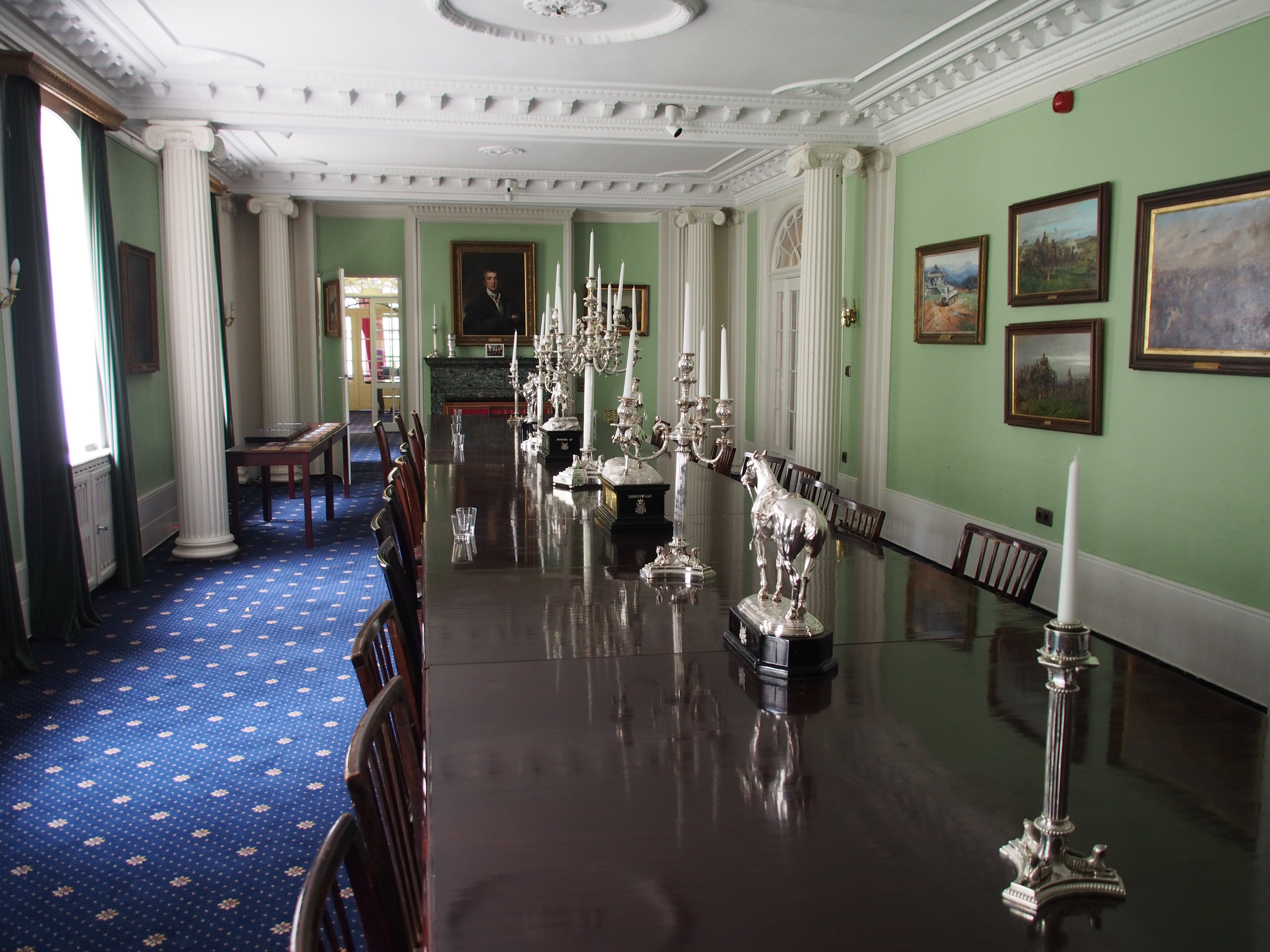
Dining room with silver candelabras and figures

== Bibliography ==
- Die Kunstdenkmale des Landkreises Celle. Textband l, Hannover/Osnabrück, 1970/1980.
- Matthias Blazek: 1936 übernimmt die Deutsche Wehrmacht Gut Bredebeck von Familie Kühling / Gebäude in Truppenübungsplatz Bergen einbezogen – Nach dem Krieg Unterkunft für die Briten, Sachsenspiegel 21, Cellesche Zeitung, 21 May 2016
