= Ostenholz Moor =

Coordinates: 52°44′19″N 9°45′07″E

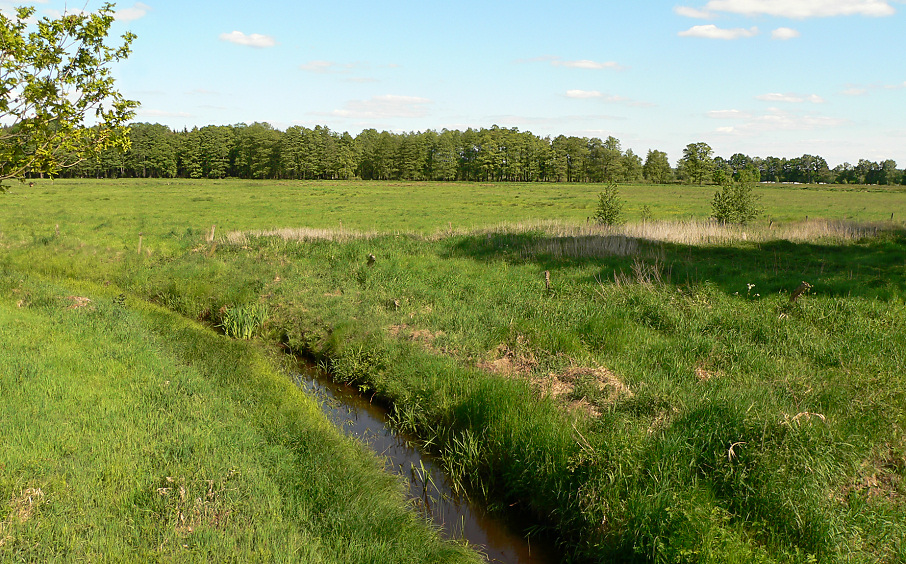
View of Ostenholz Moor

Ostenholz Moor (German: Ostenholzer Moor) is a raised bog on the Lüneburg Heath in the German state of Lower Saxony. It is named after the village of Ostenholz and is not far from Meißendorf. The bog is almost entirely within the Bergen-Hohne Military Training Area and, as a result, has been largely left to develop naturally. The River Meiße separates Ostenholz Moor from the nature and bird reserve of the Meißendorf Lakes and Bannetzer Moor.

The bog's landscape largely forms a natural boundary for the actual nature reserve which has been purchased by Celle district. The Meißendorf Lakes, formerly a network of ponds for fish-farming, are today the most important migration and breeding ground for numerous marsh and water birds. Around 250 species of bird may be seen here, including the crane, the black stork and the osprey.
