= Meißendorf Lakes and Bannetze Moor =

Nature reserve in Lower Saxony, Germany

Coordinates: 52°42′40″N 9°49′00″E

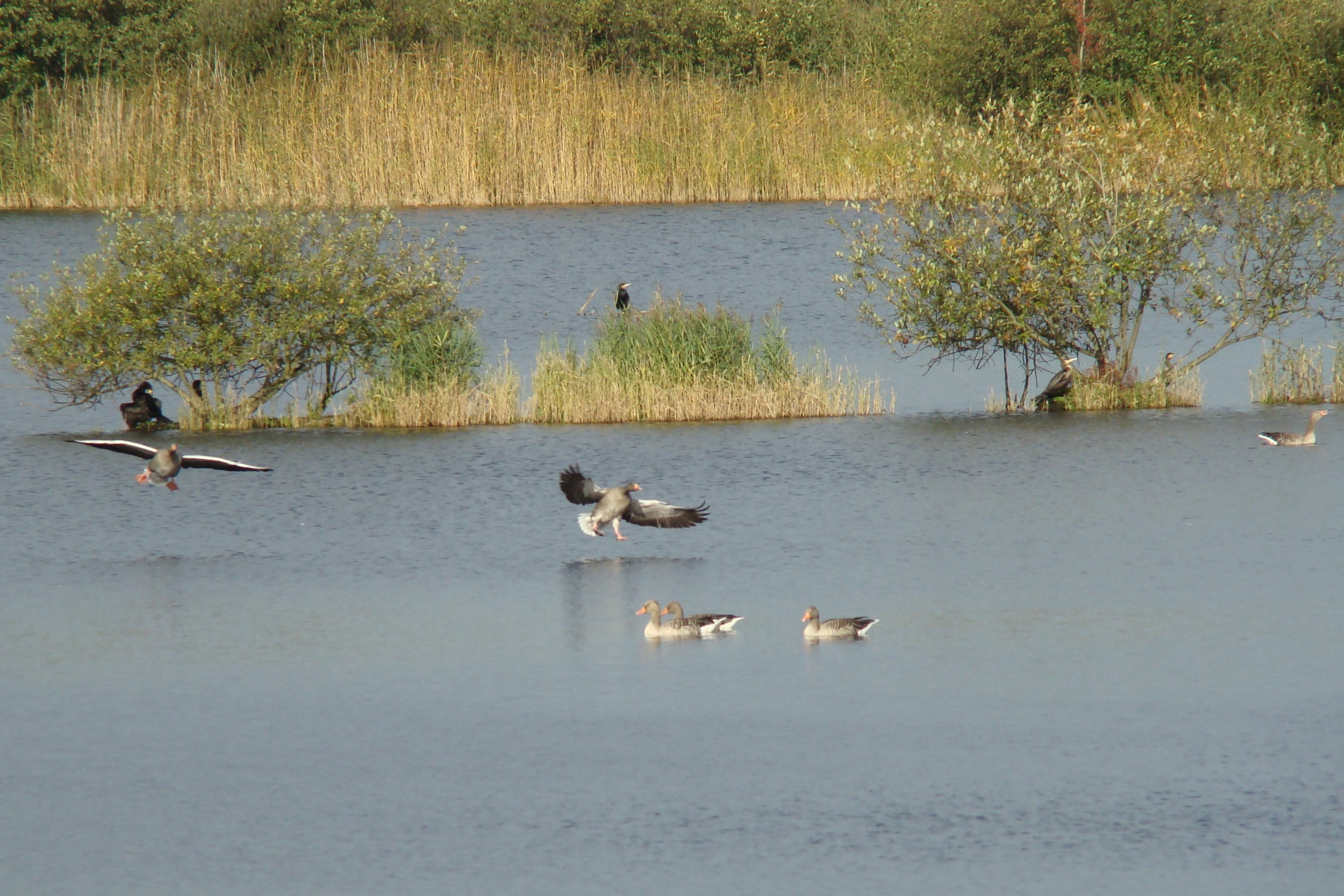
Island with cormorants and incoming greylag geese

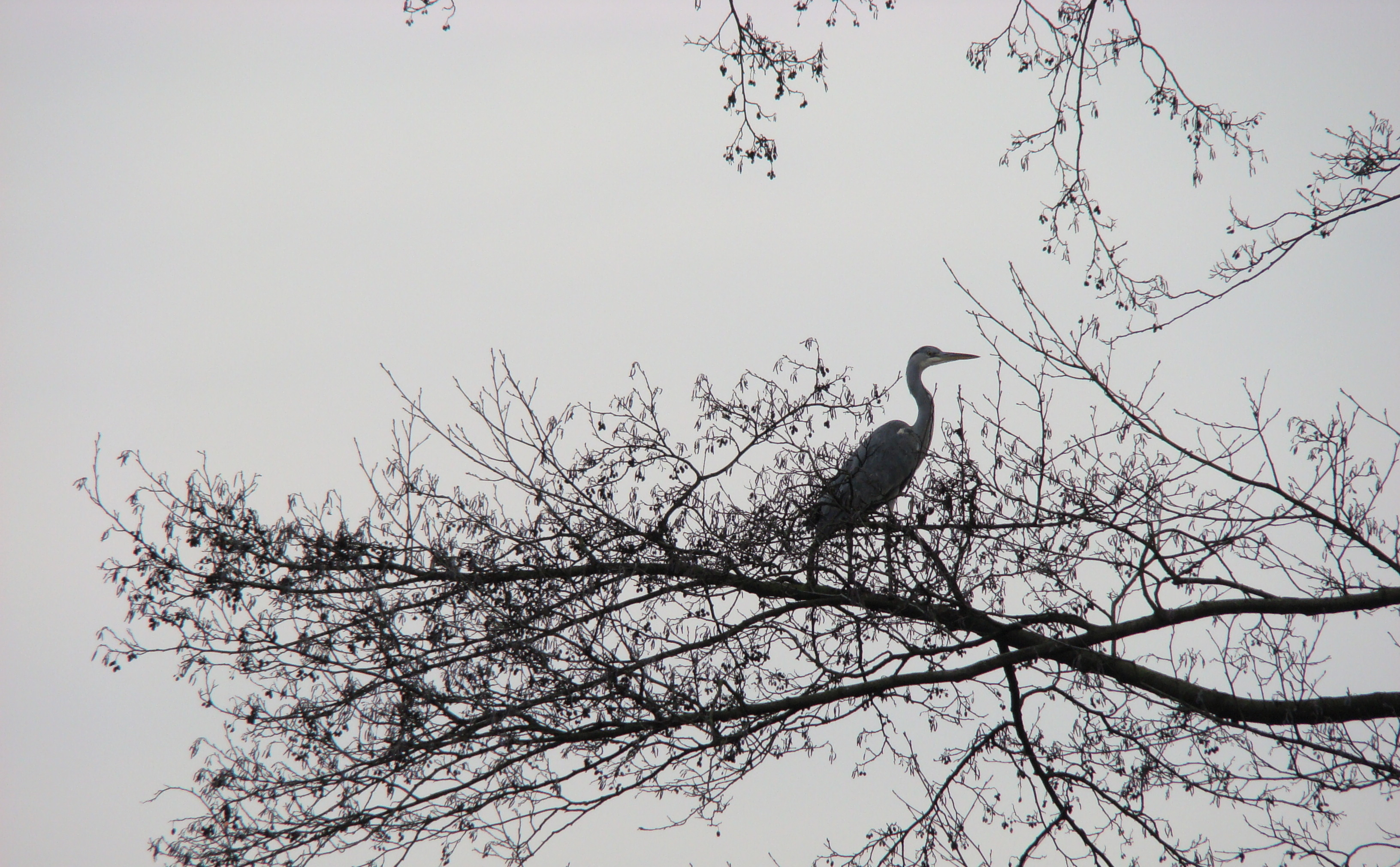
Grey heron on an alder tree

The Meißendorf Lakes and Bannetze Moor (German: Meißendorfer Teiche mit dem Bannetzer Moor) are a nature reserve and bird reserve of national importance on the edge of the Lüneburg Heath in the state of Lower Saxony in northern Germany. The special importance of this nature reserve is underlined by its recognition as a major federal nature reserve project. The area derives its name from the nearby villages of Meißendorf and Bannetze. The lakes were formerly a network of ponds established for fish-farming.

== Location ==
The Meißendorf Lakes and Bannetze Moor nature reserve lies about 7 kilometres (4.3 mi) northwest of Winsen an der Aller, and about 40 kilometres (25 mi) north of Hanover. To the north is the Ostenholz Moor which comes almost right up to the edge of the reserve, the River Meiße running between the Ostenholz Moor and the Meißendorf Lakes. Several kilometres to the south of the area is the valley of the River Aller.

== Formation and history ==
=== Sunder Estate ===
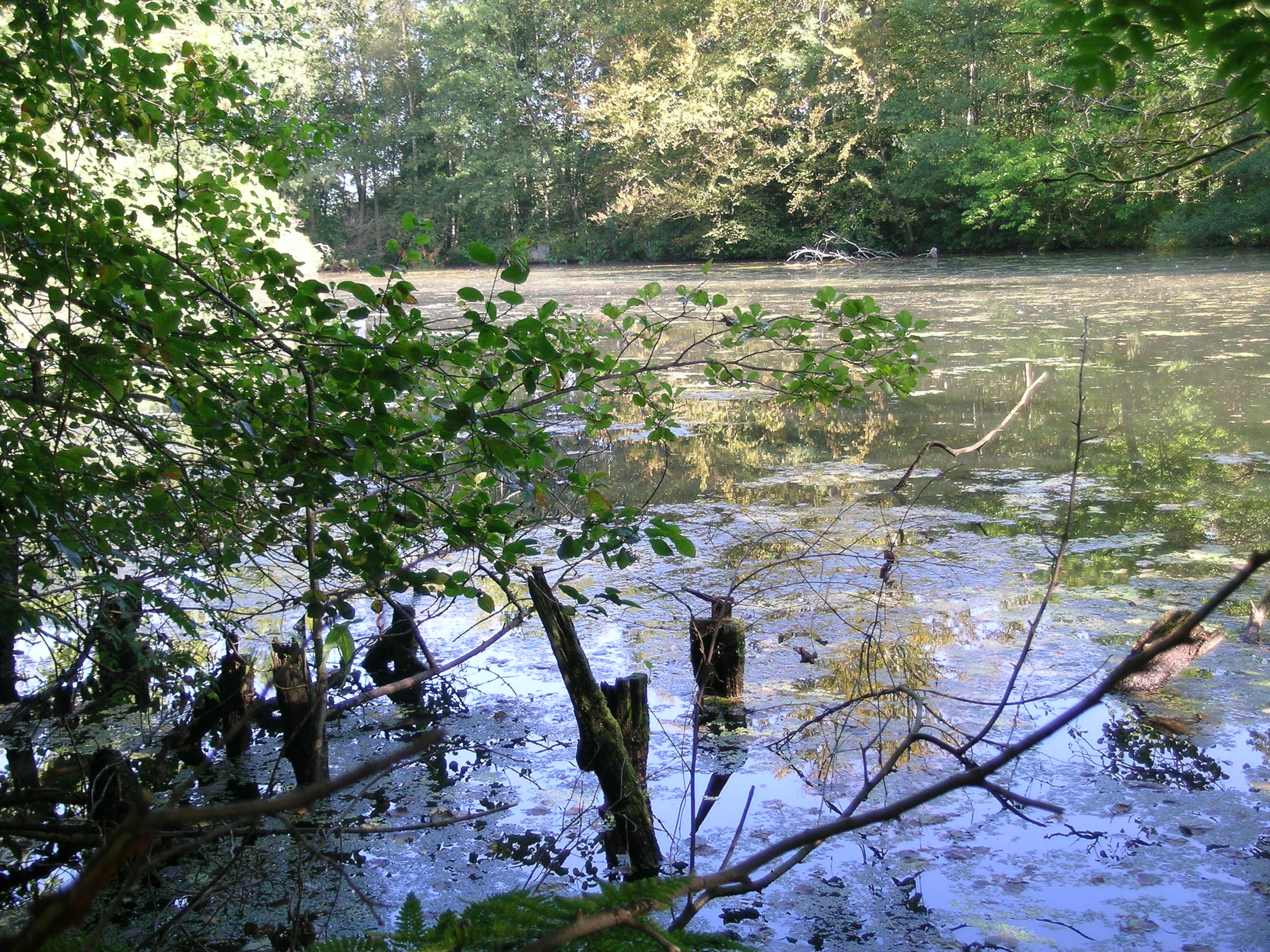
Pond by Gut Sunder

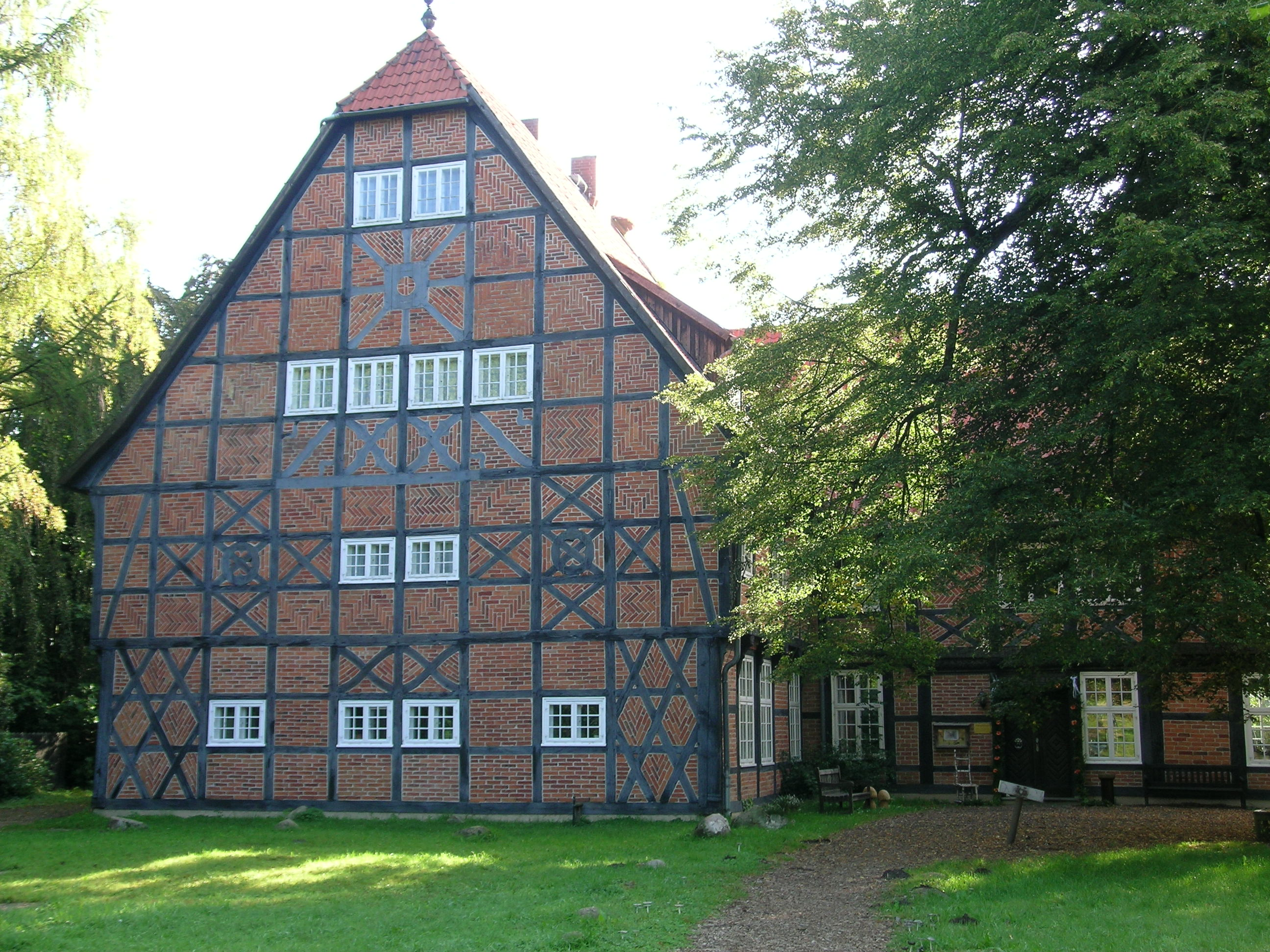
Gut Sunder Manor House

The Sunder Estate (Gut Sunder) had its origins in a freeholding (Freihof) of the St. Michaelis Monastery in Lüneburg, with the church acting as Lord of the manor. In 1548 the Lüneburg Chancellor at the court of Celle (Celler Hof), Baltasar Klammer, was enfeoffed with the monastery's estates in Meißendorf by Abbot Herbold of St. Michaelis Monastery. He transferred his seat, however, from the village of Meißendorf to a separate location nearer his own estates. This is the origin of the name: the German word for 'separate' is gesondert which became sonder and then sunder. On a site surrounded by ditches and small ponds a manor house (Herrenhaus) was built in the characteristic style of a Celle town house. After ownership of the estate had changed hands several times, in 1752 it was acquired by the von Schrader family. In 1881 a family cemetery was laid out northwest of the estate, in the woods by the Meiße, which is still there today. In 1977 the von Schrader family had to sell the estate for financial reasons. In 1980 the German Society for the Protection of Birds (DBV) (today the German Society for the Conservation of Nature or NABU) and the Federal Government, with the financial support of IBM, purchased a large part of the land in order to ensure the preservation of this significant wetland habitat. The Lower Saxony branch of NABU maintains a regional nature experience centre which also runs seminars. Nowadays the manor house is a listed building and is one of the most beautiful secular buildings on the heath.

=== Pond environment ===
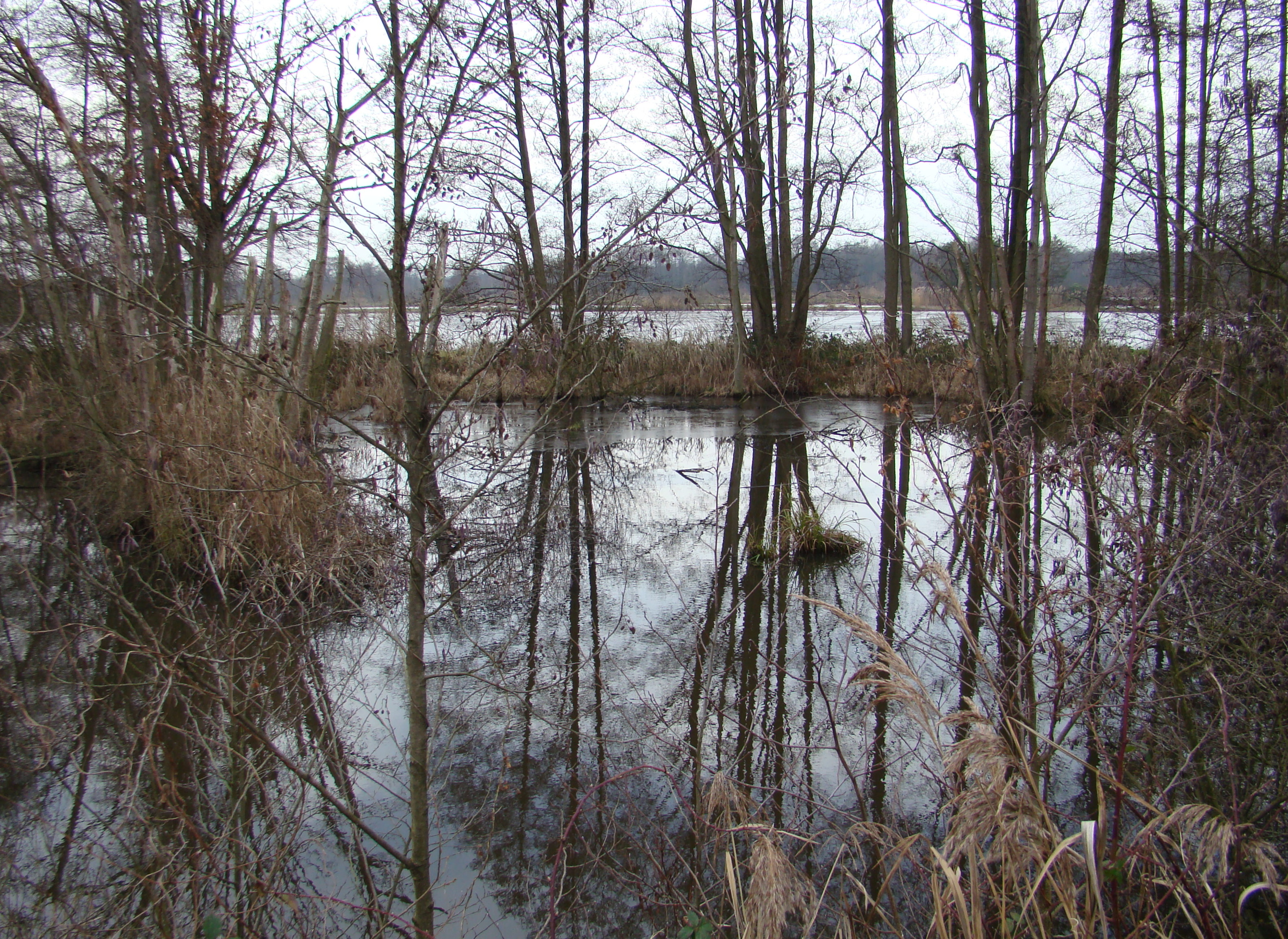
Area of pond with alder grove

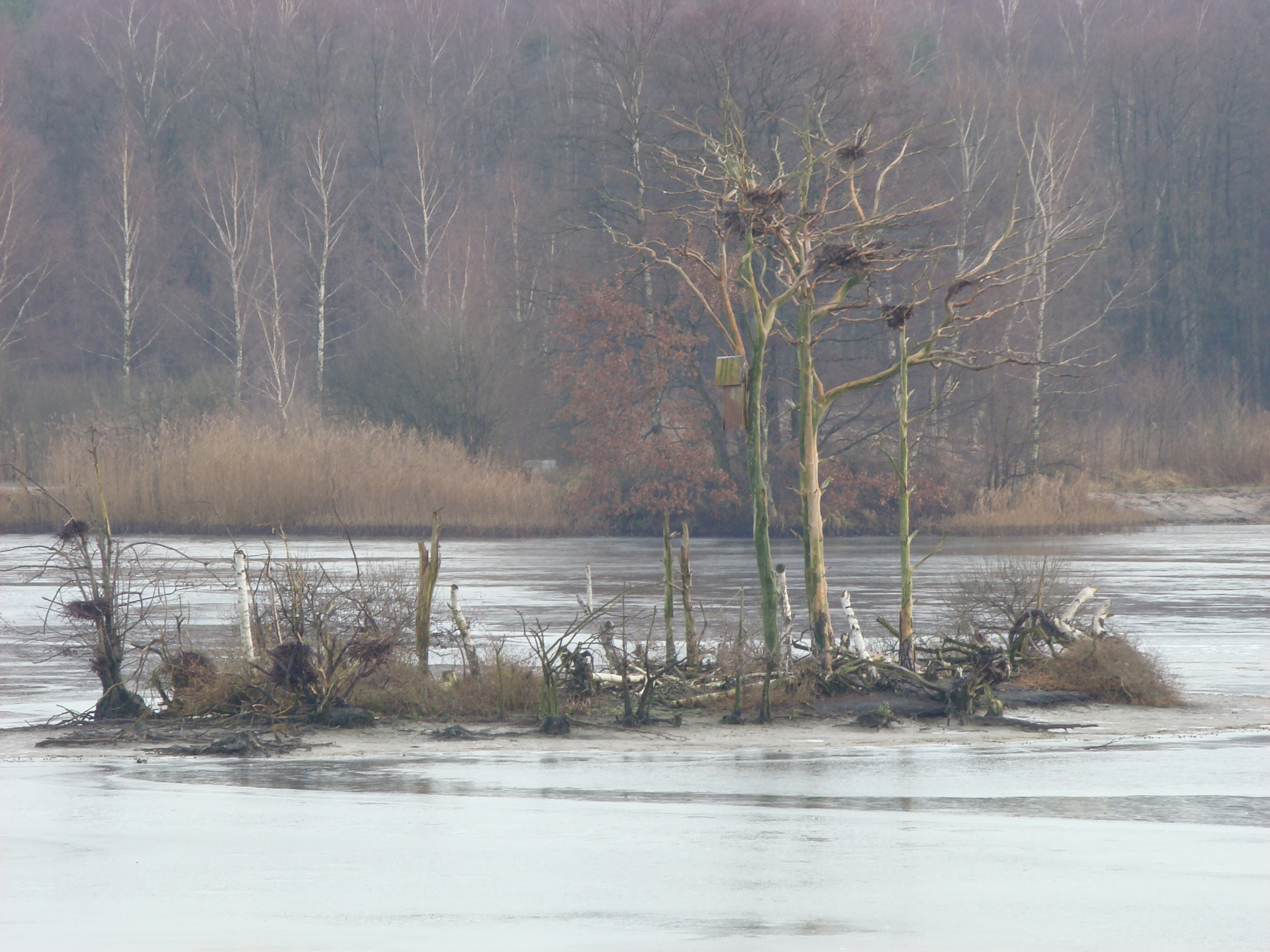
Pond island with cormorant nests

In 1881 the owner of the Sunder Estate, Ernst von Schrader, created the fish-farm. Fifty-one large and small ponds were laid out on heath and marshland. The Meiße, a small river which flowed into the Aller near Hodenhagen, was canalised and since then has fed the ponds with water. In 1892 he placed 10,000 carp eggs in his oldest pond, which had an area of 2 hectares (4.9 acres). This established the largest carp farm in north Germany. In the 1960s and '70s most of this extensive fish farming was wound down. Parts of the Meiße reverted to their natural state again. To the northwest of the Sunder Estate the Meiße today has returned to its old course.

== Geography, fauna and flora ==
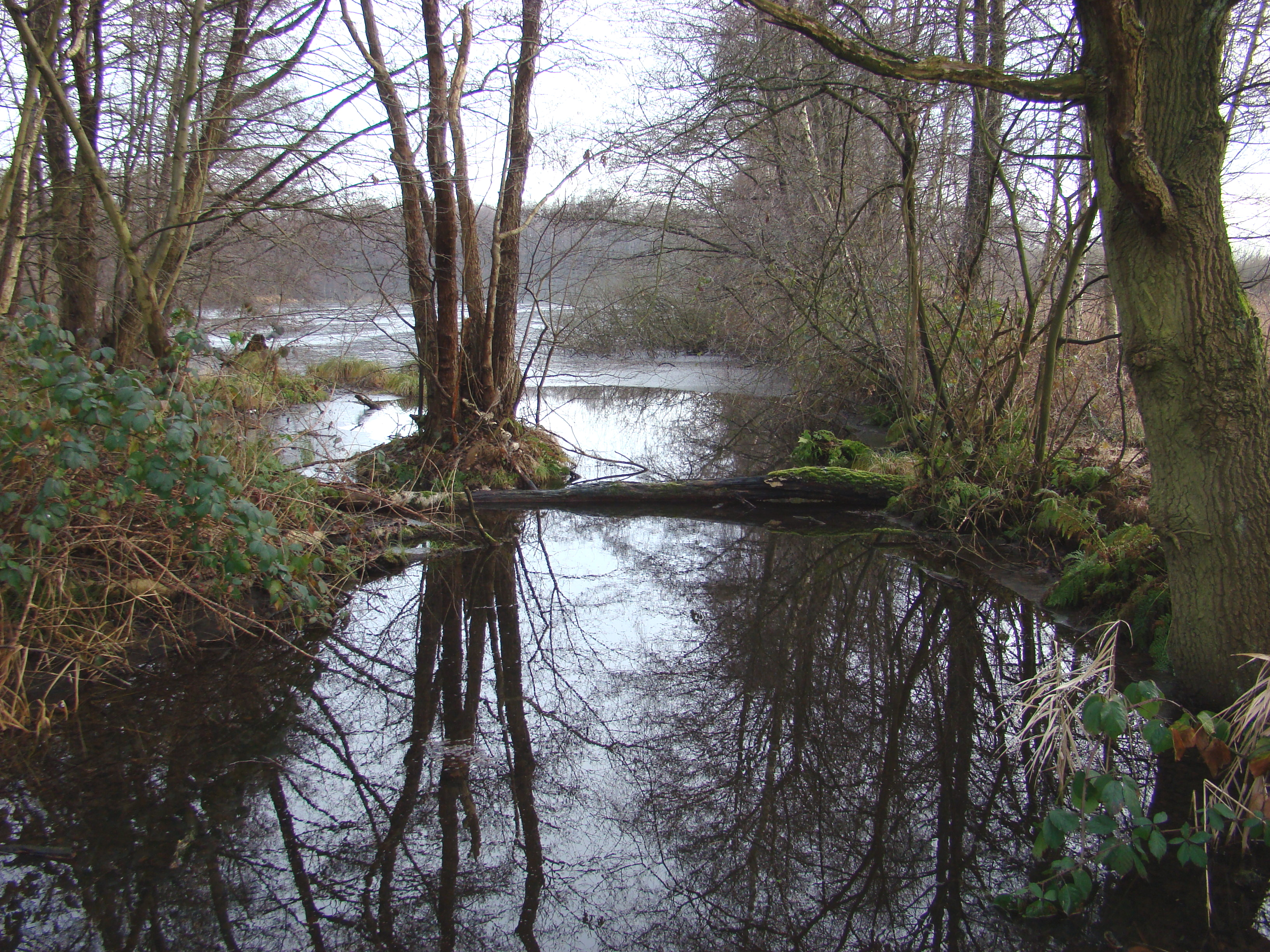
Area of pond in the nature park

The Meißendorfer Teiche/Bannetzer Moor nature reserve covers an area of 815 hectares (2,010 acres), the waterways themselves, with 80 fish ponds, cover some 350 hectares (860 acres). They thus form the largest water feature in the Lüneburg Heath. The nature reserve has:

- Ponds which are arranged sequentially
- Parts of the Meiße valley with meadows and alder wood marshes
- Areas of alluvial sand in the north and east, covered with pines
- Degenerate and cultivated areas of the Bannetze Moor with small pockets of raised bog.

In the pond area, which is particularly well known for its rich bird life, about 130 species of breeding bird can be seen, of which about 40 are endangered, as well as another 60 species of visitors. In addition about 40 types of dragonfly and over 400 species of butterfly live here.

=== Breeding birds ===
Species that breed here include: white-tailed eagle, sedge warbler, bittern, garganey, peewit, to name only those on the IUNC Red List of Endangered Species. But other rare species also breed here, such as the kingfisher, crane, penduline tit, little grebe, water rail, reed warbler, great crested grebe, cormorant, grey heron, greylag goose, gadwall, red-crested pochard, barn owl, black-headed gull, marsh harrier, coot, shoveler, sparrowhawk and red kite.

=== Visiting birds ===
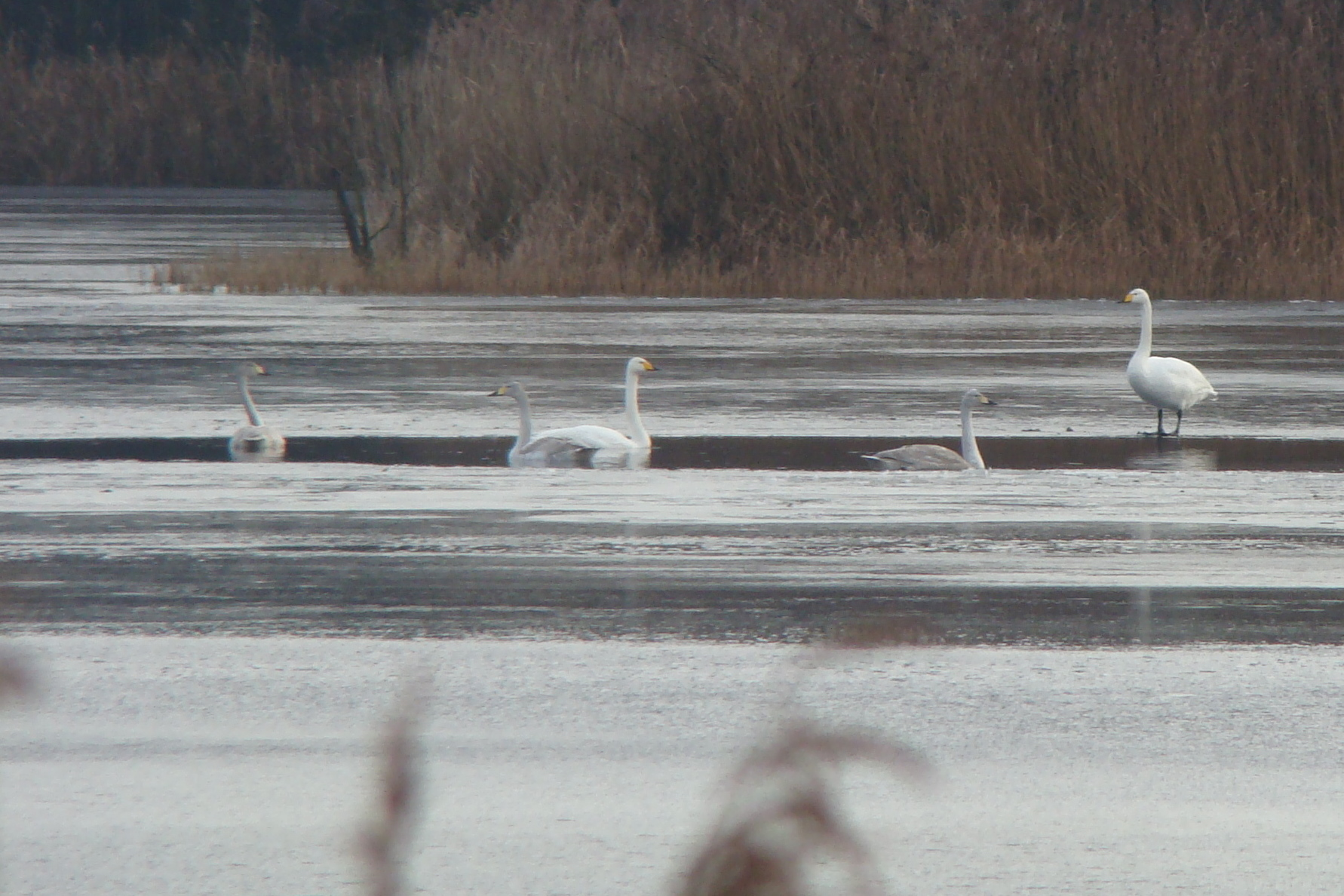
Whooper swans, winter guests from the tundra

Amongst the visiting birds are many species that are also on the Red List: Osprey, common sandpiper, ruff, redshank, black stork, goosander and dunlin. Others include: Siskin, rock pipit, Bewick's swan, Whooper swan, hen harrier, little ringed plover, common snipe, smew, common gull, wigeon, pintail, black tern, crossbill and spotted redshank.

=== Fish ===
In the ponds and streams the following species of fish may be found: Northern pike, common carp, tench, common roach, carp bream, common rudd, crucian carp, silver bream, ruffe, bitterling, eel, perch, three-spined stickleback, ninespine stickleback, brown bullhead, loach, brown trout, gudgeon, brook lamprey.

=== Plants ===
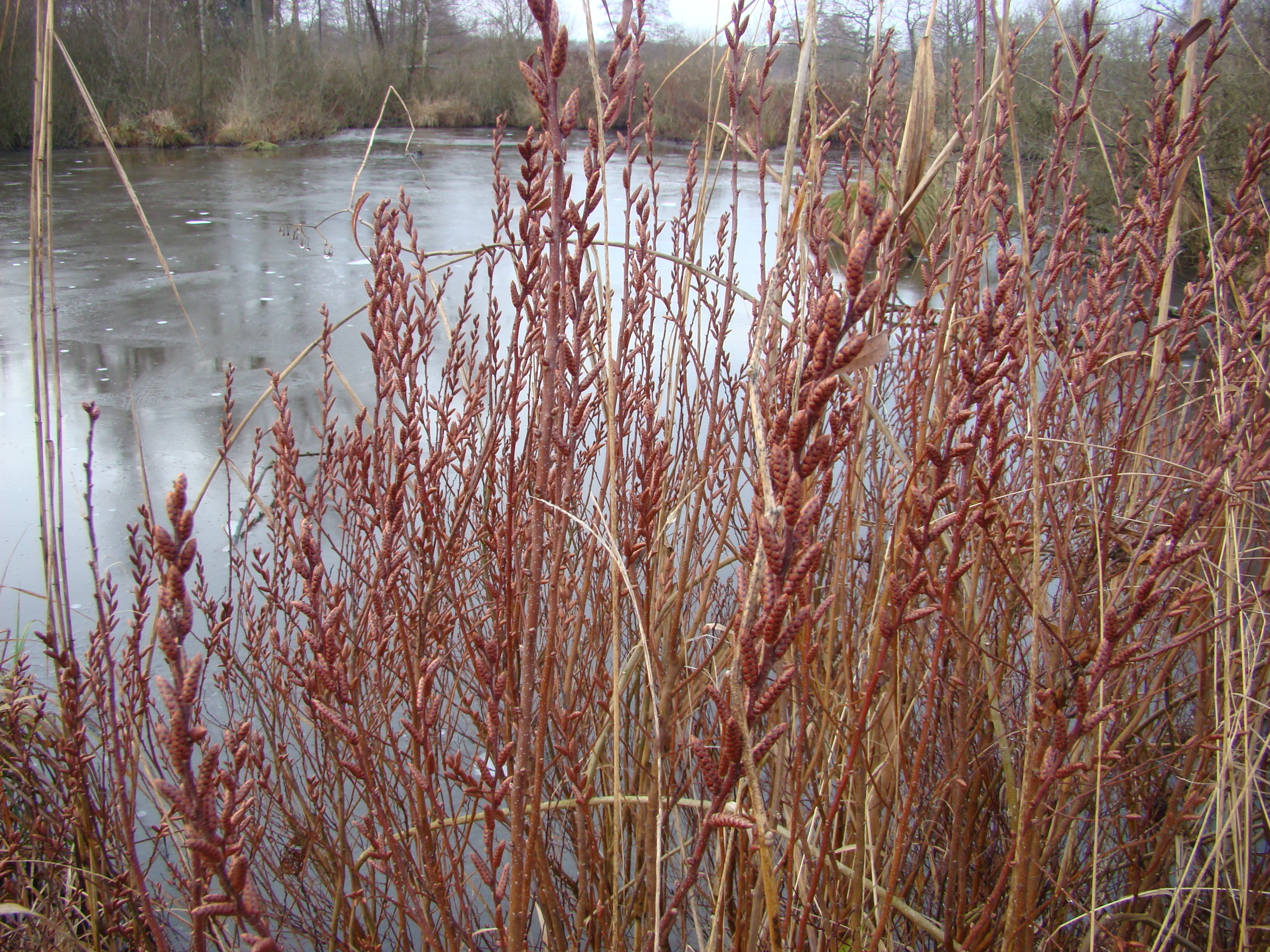
Myrica gale on the banks of a pond

The red-listed Myrica gale, which is on the IUCN Red List of Endangered Species, grows on the pond embankments. Other plants that grow here, including some protected species, are the: white water-lily, downy birch, water soldier, woody nightshade, flatleaf bladderwort, small bur-reed, tufted loosestrife, sneezewort, branched bur-reed, cowbane (very poisonous), six-stamened waterwort, yellow flag, Eupatorium.

=== Other wildlife ===
The nature reserve is home to the European otter, a creature which is both shy and very rarely seen in Germany. Protected amphibians and reptiles that may be found here include the: Grass snake, common frog, marsh frog, common spadefoot, moor frog and great crested newt.

== Tourism ==
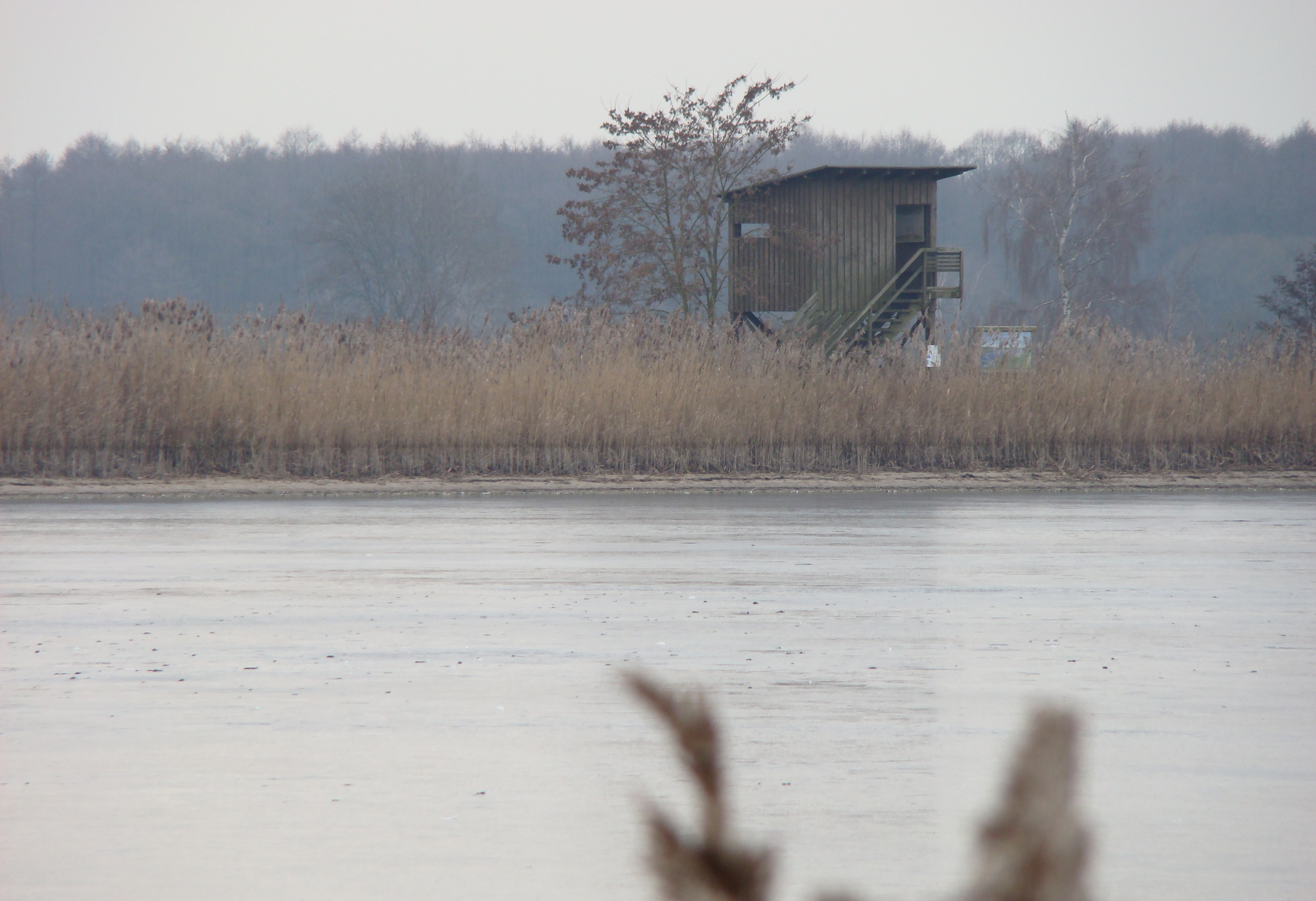
Observation tower by the water

Around the 35 hectares (420,000 sq yd) Hüttensee lake, which projects into the nature reserve but does not belong to it, a 4.6-kilometre (2.9 mi) long circular path has been made, from which numerous rare species of bird can be observed. Many bird watchers from all around the world visit this area every year. On the edge of the Hüttensee is a campsite.

In 1948 the first cinema film by the famous nature cameraman, Heinz Sielmann, was made here (Lied der Wildbahn).

== Sources and maps ==
- Google Maps: Aerial photograph of Meißendorf Water
