= Meißendorf =

- Ortschaft of Winsen (Aller)
- Interactive map of Meißendorf
- Location within Germany Location within Lower Saxony
- Coordinates: 52°43′46″N 9°51′01″E
- Country: Germany
- State: Lower Saxony
- District: Celle
- Municipality: Winsen (Aller)
- Elevation: 40 m (130 ft)

Population
  - Total: 1,663
- Time zone: UTC+01:00 (CET)
  - Summer (DST): UTC+02:00 (CEST)
- Postal codes: 29308
- Dialling codes: 05056

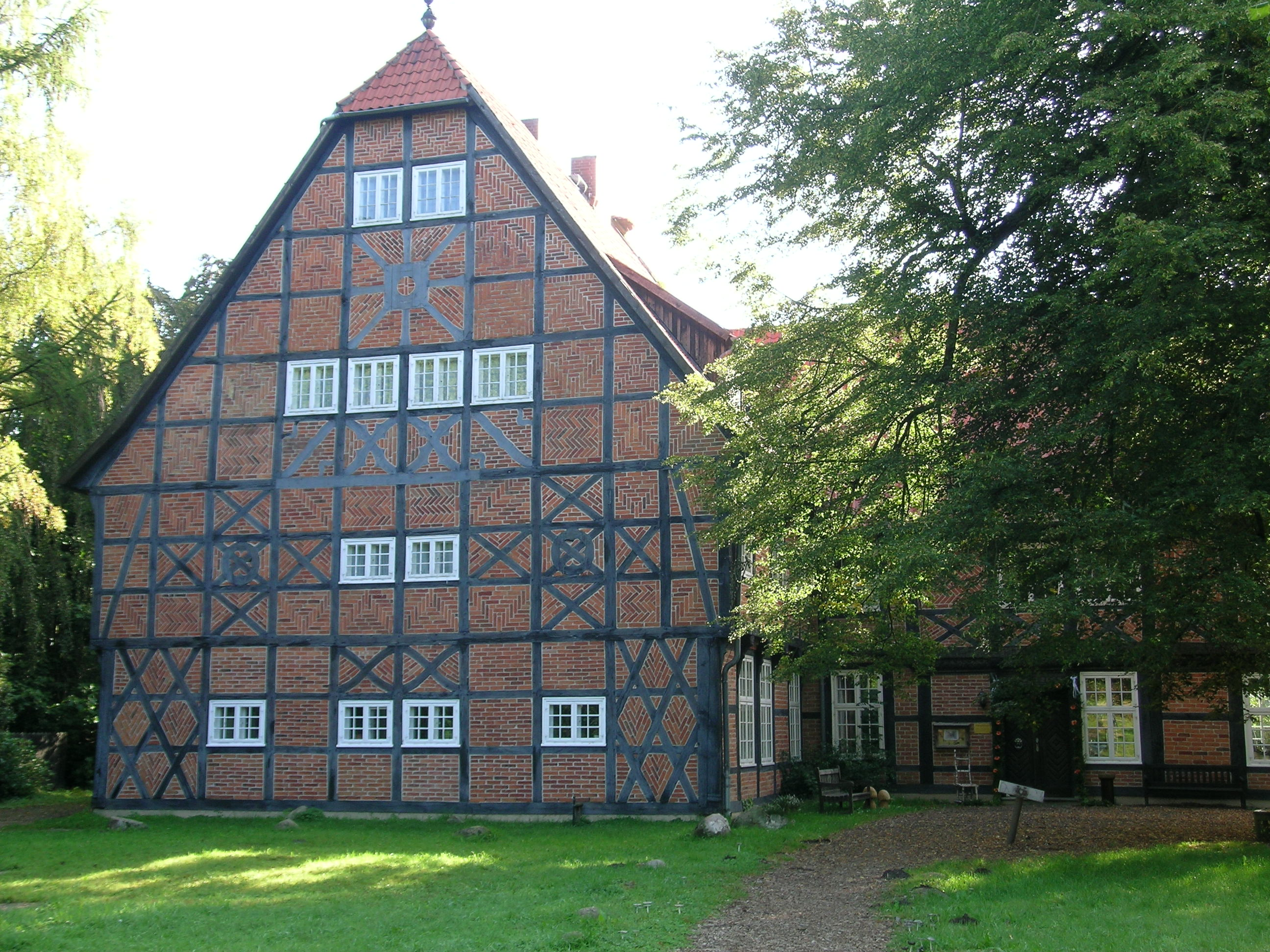
The former manor house of Gut Sunder

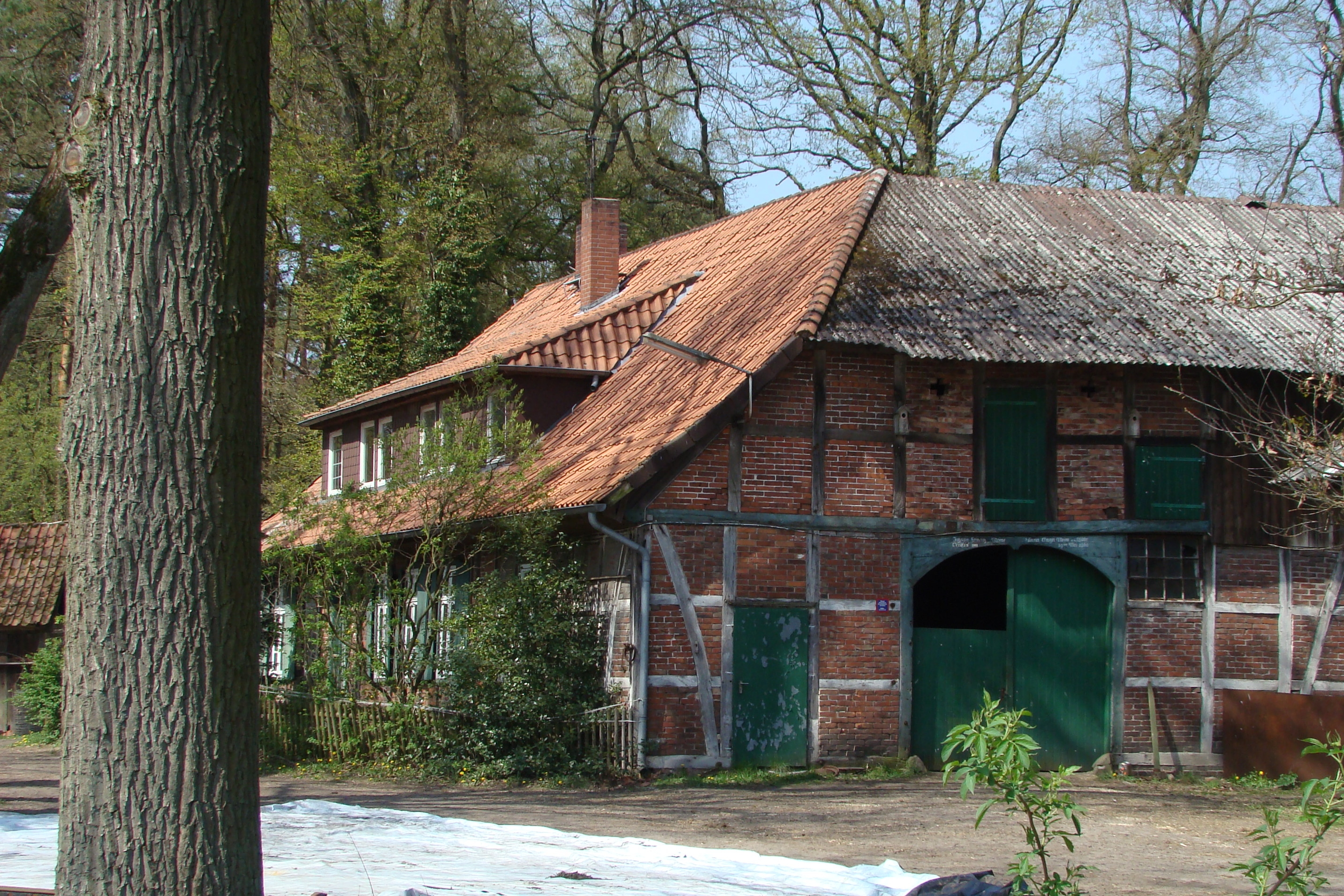
An old farmstead in Meißendorf

Meißendorf is a village and Ortschaft (municipal division) of the municipality of Winsen an der Aller in the Lower Saxon district of Celle in northern Germany.

It lies 6 kilometres (3.7 mi) northwest of Winsen an der Aller. It derives its name from the river Meiße which flows through the village. 1,666 people have their main residence in Meißendorf and 224 have a second home here. There is also a campsite with about 100 permanent pitches and a mobile home site. The Lower Saxony Nature Conservation Society runs a nature conservation centre on the Sunder Estate (Gut Sunder) with 600 participants annually and about 1,000 conference participants. There are also hotel and day visitors. Meißendorf is also home to the Hütten Lake (Hüttensee) Park, which borders onto the 815 hectares (2,010 acres) nature reserve of Meißendorf Lakes and Bannetzer Moor.

Meißendorf is well known for being the base of the Hanover Parachute Club with its jumps onto the special landing zone at Brunsiek. It was founded in the 1970s by Olympic champion and national trainer for show jumping, Hermann Schridde, and he offers those interested the chance to do tandem jumps as well as training towards the award of a parachute jumping licence.

== Literature ==
- Judaslohn, crime novel by Andree Hesse, ISBN 978-3-8052-0800-0, (set in Eichendorf (= Meißendorf) and the nearby military training area)
