= Logvin =

Logvin, also feminine: Logvina or Logvin, if in other languages, is an East Slavic given name and surname. Ukrainian equivalents: Logvyn or Lohvyn. The given name gave rise to surnames Logvinov, Logvinovich, Logvinovsky, Logvinenko/Logvynenko/Lohvynenko. Notable people with the name include.

- Andrey Logvin, Soviet and Russian artist
- Kristina Logvin, Austrian female handball player
- Oleg Logvin, Soviet cyclist
- Logvin Chervoniy (1902–1980), Soviet Major General, participant in World War II, Hero of the Soviet Union
