= Penelope (Enda Walsh play) =

Tragicomedy play by Enda Wals written in 2010

Penelope is a 2010 tragicomedy play written by Irish playwright Enda Walsh. The play concerns the attempts of four men seeking to win over Penelope in the absence of her warrior husband, Odysseus, who has been away for the previous twenty years fighting the Trojan wars. It was commissioned for the Ruhr.2010 campaign as one of six new plays based on the Odyssey.

== Background ==
The Ruhr.2010 campaign was the successful bid to make Germany's Ruhr region the 2010 European Capital of Culture, designated by the European Union. A part of the campaign was the project Odyssey Europa (German: Odyssee Europa), where six European authors were commissioned to write a new play based on Homer's Odyssey. The six playwrights were Grzegorz Jarzyna, Péter Nádas, Emine Sevgi Özdamar, Christoph Ransmayr, Roland Schimmelpfennig and Enda Walsh. The plays focus on different episodes and were intended to add up as a retelling of the epic.

== Plot synopsis ==
The play opens with the four men, Fitz, Burns, Dunne and Quinn, in an empty swimming pool, going about their daily lives with only Burns seemingly at odds with his environment. There is a blood stain on the wall which is to revealed to be from the suicide of a fifth man, Murray, only the day before. Burns attempts to scrub away the blood, but fails. A barbecue stands towards the rear of the pool; it has never been lit and is a source of curiosity and fear for the men. In a shared dream, they see it lit, heralding their death at the hands of Odysseus. Penelope, separated from the men, stands on a platform above and unseen from the pool. A television screen relays the successive addresses by the men for her perusal in a contemporaneous nod to reality television formats. Each man hopes to win her affections through their monologues, but as the day wears on and signs and premonitions of Odysseus’ return grow more ominous, they formulate a plan to work together so that one of them may succeed in winning Penelope, thus saving the others from Odysseus’ revenge.

In a final sequence Quinn performs a quick-change cabaret routine to the music of ‘Spanish Flea’ and "A Taste of Honey" by Herb Alpert and the Tijuana Brass as the others aid his performance. Quinn costumes himself as male and female lovers of exceptional note, such as Napoleon and Josephine and Rhett Butler and Scarlett O'Hara, but when he strips down to his toga, as Eros, the Greek god of love, he is stabbed by Burns. Dunne and Fitz take part in the stabbing and Quinn is killed. Burns makes a final address to Penelope in which he argues for their collective redemption through love and human affection. Burns concludes his speech with the words “love is saved,” and at this moment "the barbecue goes up in flames. As their dream predicted, it begins from its legs and quickly spreads to the rest of the frame and grill" thus signaling the deaths of the men as above them Penelope withdraws from the stage "and into her new future".

== Selected productions and awards ==
Penelope (2010) - OberhausenTheater: RUHR.2010, Druid Theatre Company, Galway. Winner of Irish Times Theatre Awards Best Supporting Actor Award for Mikel Murfi. Traverse Theatre, Edinburgh Festival (Fringe First winner 2010). World Tour included Helsinki, New York and London. Steppenwolf Theater, Chicago (2011). The Canadian premiere was produced by Rumble Theatre in Vancouver, British Columbia (2013).

== See also ==
- Odysseus, Verbrecher
