= Olympos (novel) =

2005 novel by Dan Simmons

- Cover to the 2005 first edition
- Author: Dan Simmons
- Cover artist: Gary Ruddell; cover design by Ervin Serrano
- Language: English
- Series: Ilium/Olympos
- Genre: Science fiction
- Publisher: HarperCollins, Eos imprint
- Publication date: June 28, 2005
- Publication place: United States
- Media type: Print (Hardback)
- Pages: 690 hardcover, 891 paperback
- ISBN: 0-380-97894-6
- OCLC: 57694972
- Dewey Decimal: 813/.54 22
- LC Class: PS3569.I47292 O49 2005
- Preceded by: Ilium (2003)

Olympos is a science fiction novel by American writer Dan Simmons published in 2005; it is the sequel to Ilium and final part of the Ilium/Olympos series. Like its predecessor it contains many literary references: it blends together Homer's epics the Iliad and the Odyssey, Shakespeare's The Tempest, and has frequent smaller references to other works, including Proust, James Joyce, Caliban upon Setebos, Shelley's Prometheus Unbound, Shakespearean poetry and even William Blake and Virgil's Aeneid.

== Plot introduction ==
The novel centers on three main character groups; that of the scholic Hockenberry, Helen and Greek and Trojan warriors from the Iliad; Daeman, Harman, Ada and the other humans of Earth; and the moravecs, specifically Mahnmut the Europan and Orphu of Io. The novel is written in present-tense when centered on Hockenberry's character, but features third-person, past-tense narrative in all other instances. Much like Simmons' Hyperion where the actual events serve as a frame, the three groups of characters' stories are told over the course of the novel and their stories do not begin to converge until the end.

== References to the real world ==
The "Paris Crater" location (a devastated French capital) includes a few references to the real world, supposedly produced by folk etymology such as "Invalid Hotel" for "Hôtel des Invalides", "Champs Ulysses" for "Champs-Élysées" or "Guarded Lion" for "Gare de Lyon". A single reference in passing is made to the mountain "Pikespik" for "Pikes Peak".
