= Der Weg nach Surabaya =

1997 book by Christoph Ransmayr

- Author: Christoph Ransmayr
- Language: German
- Genre: Travel literature
- Publisher: S. Fischer Verlag
- Publication date: 1 February 1997
- Publication place: Germany
- Pages: 240
- ISBN: 3-10-062916-7

Der Weg nach Surabaya. Reportagen und kleine Prosa (lit. 'The Road to Surabaya: Reports and Short Prose') is a 1997 collection of texts by the Austrian writer Christoph Ransmayr. Collecting texts from a period of nearly two decades, it mainly consists of travel writing from Europe, Africa and Asia, but also includes other material such as three acceptance speeches from literary award ceremonies.

It was reviewed on Das Literarische Quartett on 25 April 1997. According to the scholar Ian Foster, the book, and especially its texts about Austrian subjects, contributes to the understanding of Ransmayr's 1995 novel The Dog King, which has puzzled critics with its treatment of history and place.
