= The School for Atheists =

1972 novel by Arno Schmidt

- First edition (German)
- Author: Arno Schmidt
- Original title: Die Schule der Atheisten
- Translator: John E. Woods
- Language: German
- Genre: Novel
- Publisher: Green Integer (English Edition)
- Publication date: 1972
- Publication place: Germany
- English publication date: 2001
- Media type: Print (Paperback)
- Pages: 301 pp
- ISBN: 1-892295-96-2

The School for Atheists: A Novella=Comedy in 6 Acts (German: Die Schule der Atheisten) is a novel by Arno Schmidt. It was originally published in German in 1972. It was translated into English by John E. Woods in 2001, published by Green Integer.

== Summary ==
The novel is presented as an experimental drama, making extensive use of Schmidt's playful language and typography. The story is set in 2014 and it concerns a summit of world leaders. The summit is held at the home of William T. Kolderup in Tellingstedt. A nested narrative in this story is that of the adventures of Kolderup and the mother of Isis, the American Secretary of State. In Kolderup's story, the ship that carries him and the mother of Isis is wrecked, testing the atheistic beliefs of the stranded characters.
