= Bottom's Dream =

1970 novel by Arno Schmidt

- 1977 edition of Zettel's Traum in original German
- Author: Arno Schmidt
- Language: German
- Published: 1970
- Publisher: Goverts Krüger Stahlberg
- Publication place: Germany
- English publication date: 2016

Bottom's Dream (German: Zettels Traum or ZETTEL'S TRAUM as the author wrote the title) is a novel published in 1970 by West German author Arno Schmidt. Schmidt began writing the novel in December 1963 while he and Hans Wollschläger were translating the works of Edgar Allan Poe into German. The novel was inspired by James Joyce's novel Finnegans Wake, particularly Schmidt's use of columns (his "SpaltenTechnik"), which Schmidt claimed was borrowed from the Wake.

The story itself is based on the questions of translating Edgar Allan Poe, following a couple who visits the home of a Poe translator to discuss his work. It is written in an idiosyncratic style, one in which Schmidt attempts to apply a Freudian understanding of language to the text by using various typographic features which alter the usual flow of text.

The gargantuan novel was published in folio format with 1,334 pages, with the story told mostly in three shifting columns, presenting the text in the form of notes, collages, and typewritten pages. The 2016 English translation by John E. Woods has 1,496 pages and weighs over six kilograms (13 lb).

== Title ==
The title is an adaption from a character and a scene in Shakespeare's A Midsummer Night's Dream. At the end of Act IV, Scene 1, the awaking weaver Bottom says:

"I have had a dream, past the wit of man to
say what dream it was: man is but an ass, if he go
about to expound this dream. Methought I was—there
is no man can tell what. Methought I was,—and
methought I had,—but man is but a patched fool, if
he will offer to say what methought I had. The eye
of man hath not heard, the ear of man hath not
seen, man's hand is not able to taste, his tongue
to conceive, nor his heart to report, what my dream
was. I will get Peter Quince to write a ballad of
this dream: it shall be called Bottom's Dream,
because it hath no bottom;..."

Christoph Martin Wieland translated the play in 1762 into German prose. His weaver Bottom (bottom = ball of yarn) bears accordingly a German term of weaving as his name, Zettel, which was apt for a translation of the last line (to "weil darin alles verzettelt ist", roughly 'because in it all is mixed up'). Hence "Zettels Traum" is German for Bottom's Dream.

== Summary ==
The novel begins around 4 AM on Midsummer's Day 1968 in the Lüneburg Heath in northeastern Lower Saxony in northern Germany, and concludes twenty-five hours later. It follows the lives of 54-year-old Daniel Pagenstecher, visiting translators Paul Jacobi and his wife Wilma, and their 16-year-old daughter Franziska. The story is concerned with the problems of translating Edgar Allan Poe into German and with exploring the themes he conveys, especially regarding sexuality.

The novel is divided into eight books, as follows:

Book No.	Title		Summary
Book No.	English	German	Summary
1	The Horrorfield, or The Language of Tsalal	Das Schauerfeld, oder die Sprache von Tsalal	Beginning out in the fields and working their way toward Pagenstecher's house, the adults discuss Poe's novel The Narrative of Arthur Gordon Pym of Nantucket along with the drinking problems of Poe and James Joyce.
2	In the Company of Trees	In Gesellschaft von Bäumen	The focus shifts to Poe's The Journal of Julius Rodman and the role of trees in literature and mythology.
3	Dan's Cottage; (a Diorama)	Dän's Cottage. (Ein Diorama)	Over brunch at Pagenstecher's house, the adults discuss the use of plants and flowers in Poe's short story The Domain of Arnheim while Franziska flirts with Dan. The chapter ends around 12:30 p.m.
4	The Gesture of the Great Pun	Die Geste des Großen Pun	The characters continue their discussion of puns and metamorphoses, topics that run throughout the novel. Dan and Paul visit a nearby pond to continue their discussion of Poe's Rodman and Pym.
5	Franziska=Nameth	Franziska – Nameh	The four continue to analyze a variety of Poe works during an afternoon thunderstorm. Dan and Franziska are then left alone and discuss their relationship during the second half of the chapter, which ends with a medical scare.
6	‹Draino!› –	‚Rohrfrei!' –	Franziska's parents return and the four spend the rest of the afternoon on Dan's lawn discussing Poe's voyeurism, along with his alleged coprophilia. After an argument with Wilma over masturbation, Dan and Paul set out on foot for the (fictitious) town of Scortleben.
7	The Twilit/Toilet of the Gods/Guts	The tw/oilit of the God/uts	The men spend the evening touring Scortleben and attending a country fair, then return to Dan's house around 10.
8	In the Realms of the Neith	Im Reiche der Neith	After a snack, the four watch television, talk, view a slideshow, then go outside to stargaze and discuss voyeurism and autoeroticism in Poe's Eureka: A Prose Poem; Dan relates an attempt by one of Franziska's friends to seduce him, and "acknowledges the foolishness of being in love with a teenager".

== Editions ==
- Schmidt, Arno (1970). Zettels Traum (in German) (1st ed.). Karlsruhe: Goverts Krüger Stahlberg. OCLC 2194134.
- Schmidt, Arno (1986). Zettels Traum (in German). Frankfurt am Main: Fischer. ISBN 9783100706034. OCLC 220702166.
- Schmidt, Arno (2016). Bottom's Dream. Translated by Woods, John E. Dalkey Archive Press. ISBN 978-1628971590.
