= Oleksiy Logvynenko =

Ukrainian translator

Oleksiy Logvynenko (Ukrainian: Олекса Логвиненко, romanized: Oleksa Logvynenko; 31 March 1946 – 18 January 2016) was a Ukrainian translator who specialized in translating from German and English.

== Biography ==
Logvynenko was born on 31 March 1946 in the village of Tovmach, Shpolyansky district, Cherkasy region. He graduated from the Faculty of Foreign Languages, Taras Shevchenko National University of Kyiv. He translated from German and English the works of Heinrich Böll, Martin Walser, Peter Handke, H. Hartunh, Hermann Hesse, Friedrich Dürrenmatt, Siegfried Lenz, Franz Kafka, Elias Canetti, Bernhard Kellermann, Christoph Ransmayr, Karin Boye, Cornelia Funke, Günter Grass, L. Franko, Max Frisch, J. D. Salinger, Walter Scott, H. G. Wells and others.

== Translated works ==
=== from English ===
- Rex Stout "The Doorbell Rang" (Kyiv: Molod, 1983)
- Herbert Wells
  - "The magic shop"
  - "(The Epiornis' Island" (Knyha pryhod (The book of adventures)/Kyiv: Publishing House "Veselka", 1989)
- J. D. Salinger "The Catcher in the Rye" (Kyiv: Molod, 1984; Kyiv: Publishing House "Kotyhoroshko", 1993)
- O. Henry " The novels" (Kyiv: Molod, Kharkiv: Folio)

=== from German ===
- Siegfried Lenz "Deutschstunde" ("The German lesson") (Kyiv: Soviet writer, 1976)
- Erwin Strittmatter "Tinko" (Kyiv: Publishing House "Veselka", 1979)
- Günter Braun "Sculptor's mistake in Harmonopolisi" (Kyiv: Molod, 1983)
- Martin Walser "Seelenarbeit" ("The soul's work") (Kyiv: Publishing House "Dnipro", 1984)
- Bernhard Kellermann "Der Tunnel" ("The tunnel") (Kyiv: Molod, 1986)
- Heinrich Böll "Fürsorgliche Belagerung" ("The Safety Net") (Kyiv: Publishing House "Dnipro", 1989) - collection in two volumes
- Christoph Ransmayr "The Last World" (Kyiv: Publishing "Osnovy", 1994)
- Peter Handke "Die linkshändige Frau", ("The Left-Handed Woman") (Kyiv: Publishing "Universe", 2000)
- Max Frisch "Homo Faber" (Kyiv: Publishing "Osnovy", 2000, 2003)
- Norbert Elias "The Civilizing Process" (Kyiv, Publishing "Perun", 2003)
- Elias Canetti "Die Blendung" ("The dazzle")(Kyiv: Publishing "Universe", 2003)
- Günter Grass "Die Blechtrommel" ("The Tin Drum")(Kyiv: Publishing "Universe", 2005)
- Cornelia Funke "La vache qui lit for Herr der Diebe" ("The Thief Lord") (Kyiv: Publishing House "Schkola", 2005)
- Nikolaus Piper "Business history. World economic history from the Neolithic to globalization for pupils and students" (Kyiv, Ukrainian Publishing K. I. S., 2005)
- Friedrich Dürrenmatt "The maze", "The tower of Babel" (Kyiv: Publishing "Universe", 2005)
- Paul Maar "What's new about Mr. Bello" (Vinnytsia: Publishing "Teza", 2008)
- Kirsten Boie "Skoglandia" (Vinnytsia: Publishing "Teza", 2008)
- Yiura Traiber "The blue lake is green today" (Vinnytsia: Publishing "Teza", 2008)
- Cornelia Funke "Inkheart" (Vinnytsia: Publishing "Teza", 2008)

== Awards ==
- The winner of Mykola Lukash literary prize
- The winner of Literature Award of Austrian Federal Chancellor
- The winner of Maksym Rylsky's Award
