= Odysseus, Verbrecher =

Play by Christoph Ransmayr

Cover of the first book edition

Odysseus, Verbrecher. Schauspiel einer Heimkehr (lit. 'Odysseus, Criminal: Play about a Homecoming') is a play by the Austrian writer Christoph Ransmayr, first performed in 2010. It is based on an episode toward the end of Homer's Odyssey, where Odysseus returns to his kingdom and slaughters his wife's suitors, who are called reformers in the play. Odysseus, Verbrecher was commissioned for the Ruhr.2010 campaign as one of six new plays based on the Odyssey.

== Background ==
The Ruhr.2010 campaign was the successful bid to make Germany's Ruhr region the 2010 European Capital of Culture, designated by the European Union. A part of the campaign was the project Odyssey Europa (German: Odyssee Europa), where six European authors were commissioned to write a new play based on Homer's Odyssey. The six playwrights were Grzegorz Jarzyna, Péter Nádas, Emine Sevgi Özdamar, Christoph Ransmayr, Roland Schimmelpfennig and Enda Walsh. The plays focus on different episodes and were intended to add up as a retelling of the epic. Ransmayr chose to portray the violent side of Odysseus and how he influenced his son Telemachus to also become a killer.

== Plot ==
Odysseus, king of Ithaca, returns to his homeland 20 years after sailing away to fight in the Trojan War. He does not recognise the place, which is littered with garbage, and the first person he encounters on the beach—Athena—also appears alien to him. As three shepherds play a game, the situation on the island is revealed to the audience: power has been usurped by a group of reformers who, led by Antinous, also are suitors of Odysseus' wife, Penelope. When Odysseus meets the shepherds, they initially attack and overpower him. However, upon seeing his tattoo of a skull, which is recognized as the royal emblem of Ithaca, they realize his identity and explain the situation. Odysseus then wakes up surrounded by a choir of ghosts who were injured in the war, recognizing both fallen comrades and enemies among them. The ghosts mock him, making him aware of the misery and poverty that Ithaca has fallen into. It becomes evident that Odysseus is the only one who can see the ghosts, but their accounts of Ithaca's plight are accurate. Odysseus reunites with his son Telemachus, whom he has not seen since he was an infant. During their conversation, Odysseus claims to have overcome the war, omitting any mention of the ghosts that continue to haunt him. He tells Telemachus he plans to enter the court disguised and talk sense into the reformers, convinced that his name will be enough to restore order and that his return will be a feast for everybody. The madwoman Eurycleia tells the reformers Antinous, Eurymachus and Amphinomus that Odysseus has returned. They do not believe her, do not recognise Odysseus when they see him and mock him for being dressed in rags. Penelope demands to be left alone with the man, who she immediately recognised as her missing husband. She accuses him of having abandoned his family and argues that he is not the same man as when he left. They are interrupted by Telemachus who says there is unrest between the reformers and an angry mob of people who want to see Odysseus. Against Penelope's protests, Odysseus decides to fight the reformers together with Telemachus, arguing that this is how peace is won. After the battle is won, Odysseus feels content, but now Telemachus, who killed Antinous and Eurymachus, also sees the choir of ghosts. Penelope is horrified and accuses Odysseus of having turned Telemachus into his equal.

== Production history ==
S. Fischer Verlag published Odysseus, Verbrecher as a book in February 2010. It was first performed at the Schauspielhaus Dortmund as the last part of the Odyssey Europa series. Ransmayr's play was directed by Michael Gruner and the actors wore papier-mâché masks supposed to make them look like terrorists. The six plays were performed together on 27–28 February, 6–7 March, 13–14 March, 2–3 April and 22–23 May 2010. The first Austrian production was at the Schauspielhaus Salzburg and premiered on 19 March 2015, directed by Robert Pienz and starring Harald Fröhlich as Odysseus.

== Reception ==
Uwe Schütte of the Wiener Zeitung says Odysseus, Verbrecher is Ransmayr's best play. He says it is carried dramaturgically by the choir of ghosts, which corresponds to the modern concept of post-traumatic stress disorder, and is one of many cases where the play lets mythology and modern events interweave and inform each other, creating a "poetic idiosyncrasy" full of recognition. Die Presse's Eva Pfister says the masks from the original production were sometimes awkward, but occasionally provided a sense of something ancient, summarising the play as "a clear, sometimes preachy accusation against warmongers who turn a blind eye to the consequences of their actions". Reviewing Schauspielhaus Salzburg's production, Gerhard Dorfi of Der Standard says the staging and cast managed to ground the myth by using allusions to contemporary Greece, such as how one of the reformers wore a Syriza shirt, but that messages about how "new brooms don't sweep any better than the old ones" can be a bit flat. According to the scholar Stephanie Jug, the play deals with a utopian conception of the home, prevalent in the cultural history of the German word Heimat. She describes it as "the longing for an innocent society without wars and crimes, and even more important, without original sin [German: Erbschuld, lit. 'hereditary guilt']".

== See also ==
- Nostos
- Oikos
- Penelope (Enda Walsh play)
