= The Stony Heart =

1956 novel by Arno Schmidt

- Author: Arno Schmidt
- Original title: Das steinerne Herz
- Translator: John E. Woods
- Language: German
- Publisher: Stahlberg Verlag
- Publication date: 1956
- Publication place: West Germany
- English publication date: 1997
- Pages: 287

The Stony Heart (German: Das steinerne Herz. Historischer Roman aus dem Jahre 1954 nach Christi) is a 1956 novel by the German writer Arno Schmidt.

== Plot ==
The biographer Walter Eggers researches the 19th-century statistician Friedrich Jansen in 1954. Eggers visits Jansen's estate in Ahlden where he meets Jansen's granddaughter Friede. He starts to scheme and seduce Friede in order to gain access to Jansen's book collection. The intrigues take Eggers to East Berlin, where Friede's husband has a mistress. There are many literary references, including to Jean Paul's Siebenkäs and Johann Wolfgang von Goethe's Elective Affinities. The title is a reference to the 1827 fairy tale "The Cold Heart" by Wilhelm Hauff; there is also a story by E. T. A. Hoffmann called Das steinerne Herz, but it is unrelated to Schmidt's novel.

== Publication ==
The novel was written between November 1954 and the end of April 1955. It was not published by Rowohlt Verlag, which previously had been responsible for Schmidt's titles, because his 1953 novel Lake Scenery with Pocahontas had faced charges for being pornographic and blasphemous. The Stony Heart was instead published by Stahlberg Verlag in 1956 after Schmidt agreed to make some changes. Bargfelder Bote published the original, unedited version in 1986. Dalkey Archive Press published it in English translation by John E. Woods in 1997.
