= Egal wohin, Baby =

2024 short story collection by Christoph Ransmayr

- Author: Christoph Ransmayr
- Language: German
- Publisher: S. Fischer Verlag
- Publication date: 27 November 2024
- Publication place: Germany
- Pages: 256
- ISBN: 978-3-10-397661-8

Egal wohin, Baby. Mikroromane (transl. Doesn't Matter Where, Baby: Micronovels) is a 2024 short story collection by the Austrian writer Christoph Ransmayr.

== Summary ==
The book contains 70 brief stories, none of them longer than three pages. They consist of everyday observations and excursions into literary imagination. Each story was inspired by a photograph taken by Ransmayr, included in the book in black-and-white. The pictures were usually taken in passing with a digital camera or mobile phone. Many of them were taken during travels around the world. According to Ransmayr, everything in the stories is taken from his real life, although his life includes his imagination. The title Egal wohin, Baby comes from a piece of graffiti Ransmayr found at a train station.

== Publication ==
S. Fischer Verlag published the book on 27 November 2024. Ransmayr did a release tour together with the guitarist Wolfgang Muthspiel where he read stories from the book with photos projected on a big screen while Muthspiel played variations of George Frideric Handel's "Lascia ch'io pianga".
