= Cox (novel) =

2016 novel by Christoph Ransmayr

- First edition (German)
- Author: Christoph Ransmayr
- Translator: Simon Pare
- Language: German
- Publisher: S. Fischer Verlag
- Publication date: 2016
- Publication place: Austria
- English publication date: 2022
- Pages: 304
- ISBN: 978-3-10-082951-1

Cox or, The Course of Time (German: Cox oder Der Lauf der Zeit) is a 2016 novel by the Austrian writer Christoph Ransmayr.

== Plot ==
The novel is set in the 18th century and revolves the English master clockmaker Alister Cox, who is invited by the Qianlong Emperor to come and work in the Forbidden City, where he is given a succession of seemingly impossible requests.

The Cox character is inspired by the real inventor James Cox. The real Cox never visited China, although the Qianlong Emperor did own one of his works.

== Reception ==
Gisa Funck of Deutschlandfunk wrote: "In Cox oder Der Lauf der Zeit, Ransmayr describes the clash between two highly different cultures. A strength of this in several respects masterful novel lies in how he tells us about the strangeness of the Chinese empire, without suppressing the local perspective."

The French translation was longlisted for the 2017 Prix Femina in the foreign novel category.

== See also ==
- Cox's timepiece
