= The Flying Mountain =

2006 novel by Christoph Ransmayr

- First edition (German)
- Author: Christoph Ransmayr
- Original title: Der fliegende Berg
- Translator: Simon Pare
- Language: German
- Publisher: S. Fischer Verlag
- Publication date: 2006
- Publication place: Germany
- English publication date: 2018
- Pages: 368
- ISBN: 978-3-10-062936-4

The Flying Mountain (German: Der fliegende Berg) is 2006 novel by the Austrian writer Christoph Ransmayr. It tells the story of two brothers who travel from Ireland to Transhimalaya to climb a yet unclimbed mountain. The text uses line breaks and is close to blank verse.

An English translation of the book by Simon Pare was published by Seagull Books in 2018. The book was longlisted for The Man Booker International Prize on March 12, 2018.

== Narrative framework ==
Two Irish brothers, once close but long estranged, reunite on their family farm. Together, they embark on a journey to eastern Tibet to attempt the first climb of the Phur-Ri (The Flying Mountain), a towering peak witnessed by only one Chinese driver.

Liam organizes the trip, and obtains the official Chinese authorizations, for a Lhasa-Chengdu route, with all constraints and restrictions, for scientific purposes (a cartographic void), in the region of Cha-Ri (Bird Mountain), without ever evoke the Phur-Ri nor the Te-Ri (Mountain of the Clouds). The official escort consists of guards, guides and supervisors, before being entrusted to the Khampas of the clan of Nyema.

The action takes place in the years 1990-2000, with good use of the internet, and hides nothing of the annexation of Tibet by the People's Republic of China. On the way back, Liam erases the memories of the computers, along with the rest of the inheritance.

The main, retrospective narrator is Pad, a survivor, returned to Horse Island, to liquidate the farm. He intertwines what he learned from childhood, adolescence (Captain Daddy), and those three or four months in Tibet, marches, people (clan, monasteries, hermit), objects (balaclava, calabash, prayer flags), myths (Dhjemo (p. 192 or Yeti), the slow separation from his brother, the observation of the sky (diurnal and nocturnal, Scorpion, Orion, Betelgeuse, Regulus, Spica ...), the highest measured point of our life (p. 332).

== Reception ==
Ludger Lütkehaus of Die Zeit wrote that the book sometimes borders on kitsch, but "also reminds us of the fact that great literature often emerges when the border to kitsch is avoided only by a hair's breadth".
