= Aristeion Prize =

European literary award

- Description: European literary annual prize given to authors and translators for significant contributions to contemporary European literature
- Country: International
- Presented by: European Council
- Status: Discontinued

The Aristeion Prize was a European literary annual prize. It was given to authors for significant contributions to contemporary European literature, and to translators for exceptional translations of contemporary European literary works.

The prize was established by the European Council in May 1989, as a way to promote of books and reading. Each year a jury composed of members selected by European Union countries decided on the winners. Works eligible for prizes had to be published in the three years preceding the date for the submission of entries.

It was awarded in a different Capital of Culture each year. It was first awarded in Glasgow in 1990 and was awarded every year until 1999 in Weimar. It was then discontinued and replaced by the EU's Culture 2000 programme, itself succeeded by the European Union Prize for Literature.

== Winners ==
=== European Literary Prize ===
Year	City	Literary Winner	Work
1990	Glasgow	Jean Echenoz (France)	Lac
1991	Dublin	Mario Luzi (Italy)	Frasi e incisi di un canto salutare
1992	Madrid	Manuel Vázquez Montalbán (Spain)	Galíndez
1993	Antwerp	Cees Nooteboom (Netherlands)	Het volgende verhaal
1994	Lisbon	Juan Marsé (Spain)	El embrujo de Shanghai
1995	Luxembourg	Herta Müller (Germany)	Herztier
1996	Copenhagen	Salman Rushdie (United Kingdom); Christoph Ransmayr (Austria)	The Moor's Last Sigh; Morbus Kitahara
1997	Thessaloniki	Antonio Tabucchi (Italy)	Sostiene Pereira
1998	Stockholm	Hugo Claus (Belgium)	De Geruchten
1999	Weimar	José Hierro (Spain)	Cuaderno de Nueva York

=== European Translation Prize ===
Year	City	Translation Winner	Work
1990	Glasgow	Michael Hamburger (United Kingdom)	Paul Celan: Poems of Paul Celan
1991	Dublin	Frans van Woerden (Netherlands)	Louis-Ferdinand Céline: De Brug van Londen - Guignol's Band II
1992	Madrid	Sokrates Kapsaskis (Greece)	James Joyce: Ulysses
1993	Antwerp	Françoise Wuilmart (Belgium)	Ernst Bloch: Das Prinzip Hoffnung
1994	Lisbon	Giovanni Raboni (Italy)	Marcel Proust: À la recherche du temps perdu
1995	Luxembourg	Dieter Hornig (Austria)	Henri Michaux: Un barbare en Asie
1996	Copenhagen	Thorkild Bjørnvig (Denmark)	Rainer Maria Rilke: Udsat på hjertets bjerge (Selected Poems)
1997	Thessaloniki	Hans-Christian Oeser (Germany / Ireland*)	Patrick McCabe: The Butcher Boy
1998	Stockholm	Miguel Sáenz (Spain)	Günter Grass: Ein weites feld
1999	Weimar	Claus Bech (Denmark)	Flann O'Brien: The Third Policeman

* Oeser was a German translator nominated by Ireland.
