= The Dog King =

1995 novel by Christoph Ransmayr

- Author: Christoph Ransmayr
- Original title: Morbus Kitahara
- Translator: John E. Woods
- Language: German
- Publisher: S. Fischer Verlag
- Publication date: 1995
- Publication place: Germany
- English publication date: 1997
- Pages: 448
- ISBN: 978-3-10-062908-1

The Dog King is a 1995 novel by the Austrian writer Christoph Ransmayr. Its original title is Morbus Kitahara. A work of alternative history, it is set in Central Europe after World War II and the implementation of the Morgenthau Plan, which has deindustrialized the region and created a ruthless post-apocalyptic-esque society. The main character is the son of a blacksmith who becomes the bodyguard of the only man in the area who owns a car.

An English translation by John E. Woods was published in 1997. The book received the 1996 Aristeion Prize.

== Reception ==
Curt Fields wrote in the Chicago Tribune: "The themes are grand, but the writing is far from pompous. Ransmayr's story (and John E. Woods' translation from the original German) is elegant, incisive and never labored." In The New York Times, Gabriele Annan wrote about the book's use of allegory: "Whatever it symbolizes, the narrative is wildly arbitrary; but there is something so powerful, committed and solemn about Ransmayr's tone that it seems like a command to interpret his message". The critic continued: "This can have the opposite effect, of course, and Ransmayr has affectations that can be irritating. All the same, he is a marvelous writer, though, unlike most novelists, he writes more about sensations than feelings." Publishers Weekly wrote: "Ably translated by Woods, this novel paints a convincing postapocalyptic world sent back into a nearly pre-civilized state. But Ransmayr (The Terrors of Ice and Darkness), though clearly probing the question of how Germany is to view itself in the wake of the Holocaust and WWII, never pulls his story out of his dark, expressionist atmospherics into the clear light of an answer."
