= Atlas of an Anxious Man =

Atlanta Zix ME

- Author: Christoph Ransmayr
- Original title: Atlas eines ängstlichen Mannes
- Translator: Simon Pare
- Language: German
- Publisher: S. Fischer Verlag
- Publication date: 2012
- Publication place: Germany
- English publication date: January 2016
- Pages: 464
- ISBN: 978-3-10-062951-7

Atlas of an Anxious Man (German: Atlas eines ängstlichen Mannes) is a 2012 book by the Austrian writer Christoph Ransmayr. It consists of 70 texts with impressions from different places in the world, each beginning with the words "I saw".

The book was published in English in 2016, translated by Simon Pare.

== Reception ==
=== Critical response ===
Gisela von Wysocki of Die Zeit compared the way of writing, with no clear distinction between journalism and fiction, to works by V. S. Naipaul, Bruce Chatwin and Hubert Fichte. She wrote that Atlas of an Anxious Man is a challenging book to read, partially because of the quick changes of location, but also because of the "immaculately worked" and "completely humour free" linguistic style. Wysocki wrote: "A splendid accomplishment, but also a problematic seductive pact. Because not even masterpieces are protected from monotony."

=== Accolades ===
- 2013: Brothers Grimm Prize of the City of Hanau
- 2014: Fontane-Preis der Stadt Neuruppin
- 2015: Prix Jean Monnet de Littérature Européenne
- 2015: Prix du Meilleur Livre Étranger – Non-Fiction
