= The Lockmaster =

2021 novel by Christoph Ransmayr

- Author: Christoph Ransmayr
- Original title: Der Fallmeister
- Translator: Simon Pare
- Language: German
- Publisher: S. Fischer Verlag
- Publication date: 24 March 2021
- Publication place: Germany
- English publication date: May 2024
- Pages: 224
- ISBN: 978-3-10-002288-2

The Lockmaster: A Short Story of Killing (German: Der Fallmeister. Eine kurze Geschichte vom Töten) is a 2021 novel by the Austrian writer Christoph Ransmayr. Set in a future where freshwater is rare and Europe is divided, it follows the son of a lock operator who investigates his father's possible guilt in a flooding incident that killed five people. The book was published in English translation in 2024.
