= Arno Schmidt =

German writer and translator (1914–1979)

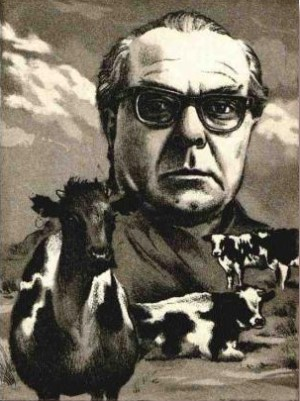
Arno Schmidt, from an illustration by Jens Rusch for his story Kühe in Halbtrauer

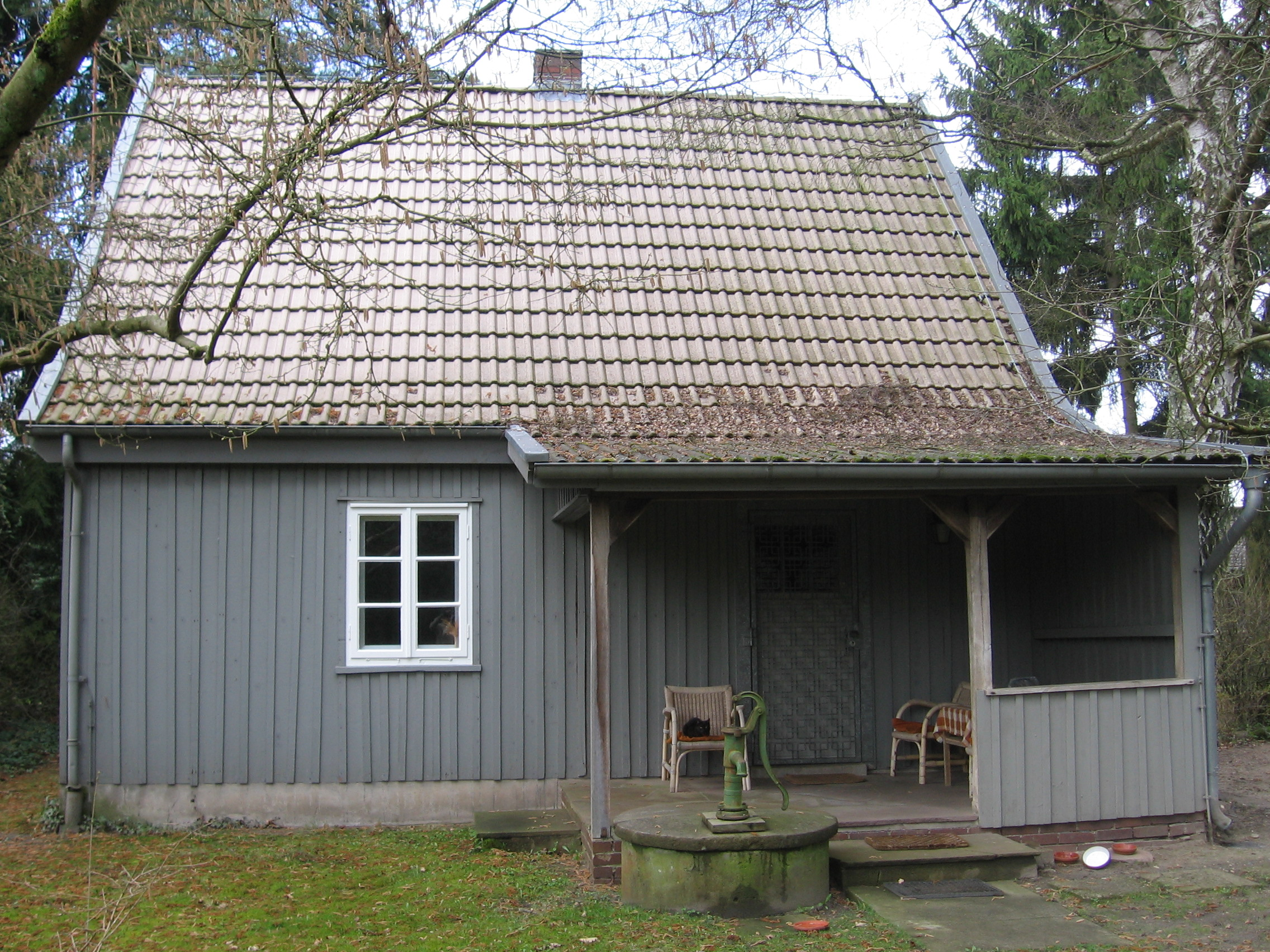
Arno Schmidt's house in Bargfeld

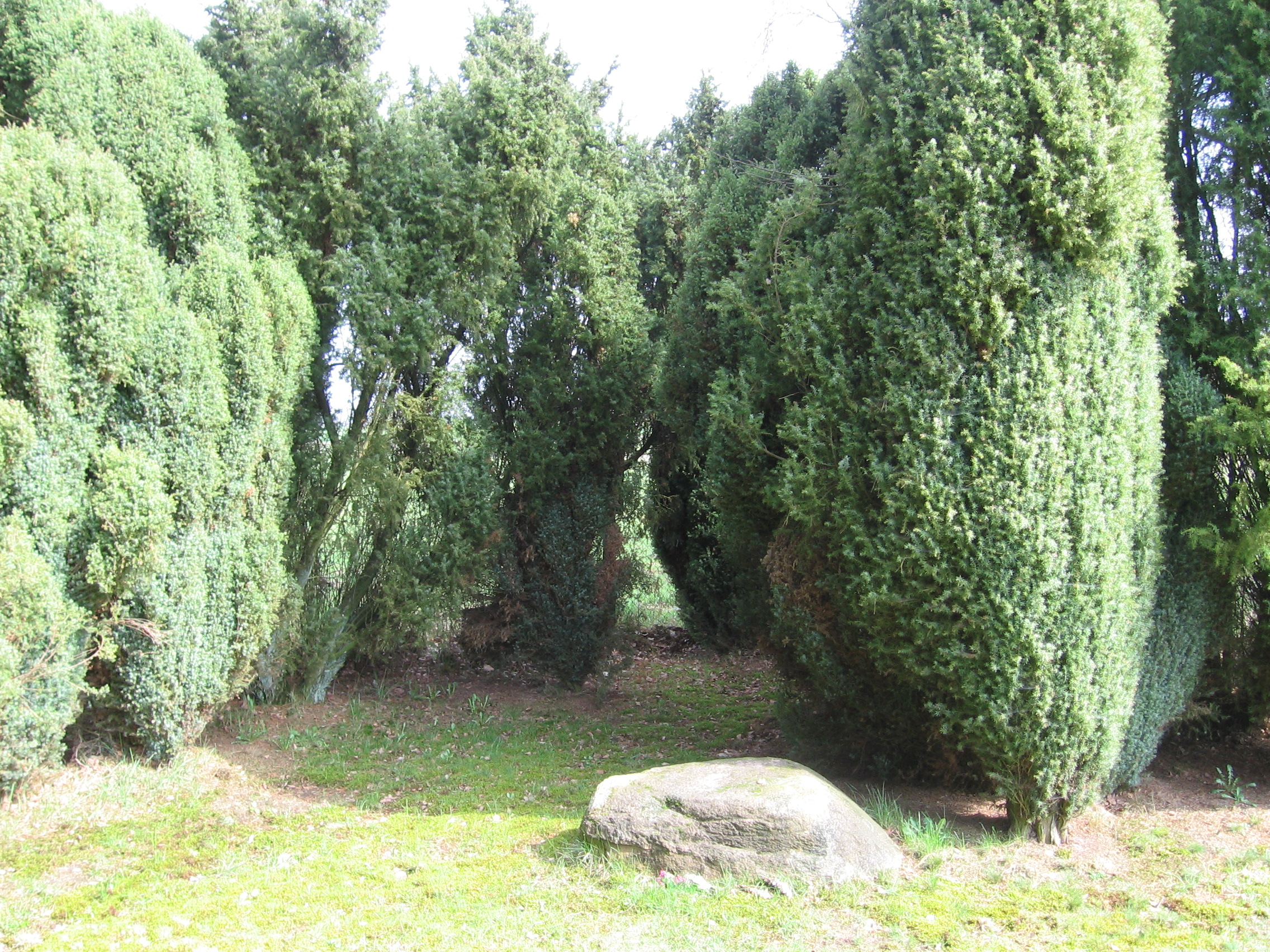
Schmidt's grave in the garden of his house in Bargfeld

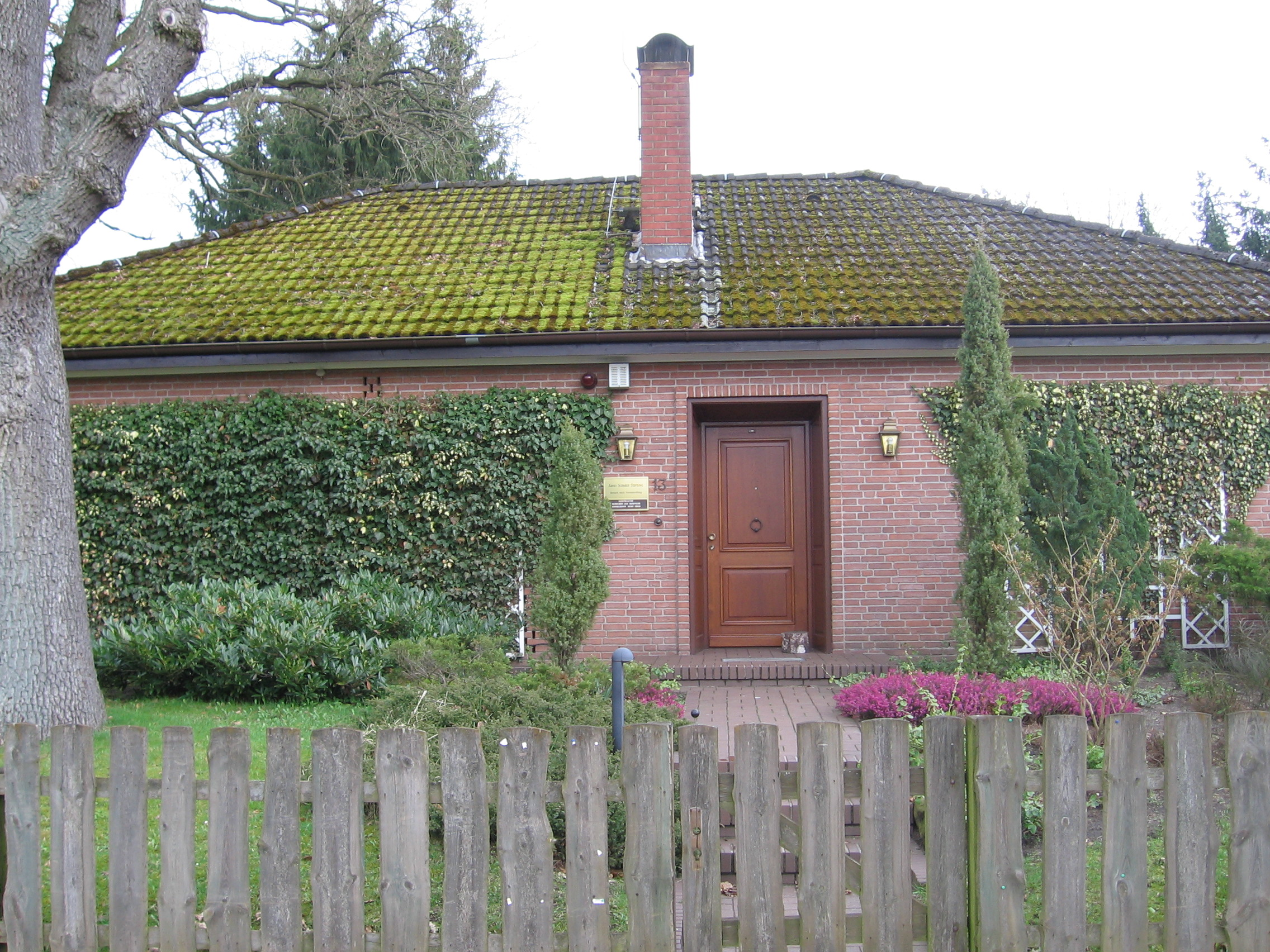
Arno Schmidt Foundation

Arno Schmidt (German: [ˈaʁno ʃmɪt]; 18 January 1914 – 3 June 1979) was a German author and translator. He is little known outside of German-speaking areas, in part because his works present a formidable challenge to translators. Although not among Germany's most popular authors, critics and writers often consider him to be one of the most important German-language writers of the 20th century.

== Biography ==
Born in Hamburg, the son of a police constable, Schmidt moved in 1928, after the death of his father (1883–1928), with his mother (1894–1973), to her hometown of Lauban (in Lusatia, then Lower Silesia, now Poland) and attended secondary school in Görlitz as well as a trade school there. After finishing school, he was unemployed for some months and then, in 1934, began a commercial apprenticeship at a textile company in Greiffenberg. After finishing his apprenticeship he was hired by the same company as a stock accountant. There, around this time, he met his future wife, Alice Murawski. The couple married on 21 August 1937; they had no children.

At the outset of World War II, in 1939, Schmidt was drafted into the Wehrmacht, where his mathematical skills led him to be assigned to the artillery corps. He first served in Alsace and after 1941 in fairly quiet Norway. In 1945, Schmidt volunteered for active front duty in Northern Germany, in order to be granted a brief home visit. He used this visit to organise his wife's and his own escape to the west of Germany, in order to evade capture by the Red Army, which was known for its much harsher treatment of prisoners of war and German civilians. Schmidt gave himself up to British forces in Lower Saxony. As refugees, Schmidt and his wife lost almost all of their possessions, including their cherished book collection.

After an interlude as a British POW and later as an interpreter at a police school, Schmidt began his career as a freelance writer in 1946. Since Schmidt's pre-war home in Lauban was now under Polish administration, Schmidt and his wife were among the millions of refugees moved by the authorities to numerous places in what was to become West Germany. During this time of uncertainty and extreme poverty, the Schmidts were sustained by CARE Packages his sister sent them from the US (his sister Lucie had emigrated to the US in 1939, together with her husband Rudy Kiesler, a Jewish German communist). Temporary accommodations led the Schmidts to Cordingen (near Bomlitz), Gau-Bickelheim, and Kastel (the latter two in the newly formed state of Rhineland-Palatinate). In Kastel, he was accused in court of blasphemy and moral subversion, then still considered a crime in some of the Catholic regions of West Germany. As a result, Schmidt and his wife moved to the Protestant city of Darmstadt in Hesse, where the suit against him was dismissed. In 1958, the Schmidts moved to the small village of Bargfeld, where they were to stay for the rest of their lives, Schmidt dying in 1979, his wife Alice in 1983.

== Writing style and personal philosophy ==
Schmidt was a strict individualist, almost a solipsist. Disaffected by his experience of Nazi Germany, he had an extremely pessimistic world view. In 1951's Schwarze Spiegel (Dark Mirrors), he describes his utopia as an empty world after an anthropogenic apocalypse. Although he was not a deist in the conventional sense, he maintained that the world was created by a monster called Leviathan, whose predatory nature was passed on to humans. Still, he thought this monster could not be too powerful to be attacked, if it behoved humanity.

His writing style is characterised by a unique and witty style of adapting colloquial language, which won him quite a few fervent admirers. Moreover, he developed an orthography by which he thought to reveal the true meaning of words and their connections amongst each other. One of the most cited examples is the use of "Roh=Mann=Tick" instead of "Romantik" (revealing romanticism as the craze of unsubtle men). The atoms of words holding the nuclei of original meaning he called Etyme (etyms).

== Bottom's Dream ==
His theory of etyms is developed in his magnum opus, Bottom's Dream (German: Zettels Traum), in which a middle-aged writer comments on Edgar Allan Poe's works in a stream of consciousness, while discussing a Poe translation with a couple of translators and flirting with their teenage daughter. Schmidt also accomplished a translation of Edgar Allan Poe's works himself (1966–1973, together with Hans Wollschläger). Some critics even dismissed Bottom's Dream as non-art, or sheer nonsense, and Schmidt himself as a "psychopath". But Schmidt's reputation as esoteric, and that of his work as non-art, has faded and he is now seen as an important, if highly eccentric, German writer of the 20th century.

== Other, minor works ==
In the 1960s, he authored a series of plays for German radio stations presenting forgotten or little known and—in his opinion—vastly underrated authors, e.g. Johann Gottfried Schnabel, Karl Philipp Moritz, Leopold Schefer, Karl Ferdinand Gutzkow, and others. These "plays" are basically talks about literature with two or three participants plus voices for quotations (Schmidt lent his voice for his translations from Finnegans Wake quoted in Der Triton mit dem Sonnenschirm [1961]). Eleven of these so-called "Radio-Essays" were republished on 12 audio CDs in 2003.

== The final years ==
1971 Schmidt was nominated for the Nobel Prize in Literature by Lars Gyllensten, a member of the Swedish Academy. But as none of Schmidt's works sold more than a few thousand copies (he openly admitted that he only wrote for the small handful of people who could appreciate his work), he lived in extreme poverty. During the last few years of his life, he was financially supported by the philologist and writer Jan Philipp Reemtsma, the heir of the German cigarette manufacturer Philipp F. Reemtsma. Schmidt's final completed novel was Abend mit Goldrand (1975) which was praised by some critics for its verbal inventiveness, although many had a difficult time digesting the erotic themes of the book. He died in a hospital in Celle on 3 June 1979 after suffering a stroke.

== Posthumous legacy ==
Dalkey Archive Press has reissued five volumes of Schmidt's work translated by John E. Woods. The series includes Collected Novellas, Collected Stories, Nobodaddy's Children, Two Novels, and most recently, Bottom's Dream. The Arno Schmidt Foundation (Arno Schmidt Stiftung) in Bargfeld, sponsored by Jan Philipp Reemtsma, is publishing his complete works.

Schmidt is mentioned in the Roberto Bolaño novel 2666.

=== Arno Schmidt Prize ===
The Arno Schmidt Prize, awarded by the Arno Schmidt Foundation and awarded from 1981 to 1988, was endowed with DM 50,000 (about €25,000). The prize has only been awarded four times:

- 1982: Hans Wollschläger
- 1984: Wolfgang Koeppen
- 1986: Peter Rühmkorf
- 1988: Karlheinz Deschner

After that the award was converted into the two-year Arno Schmidt scholarship, endowed with 36,000 euros.

=== Arno Schmidt scholarship winners ===
- 1992/1993: Ulrich Holbein
- 1994/1995: Andreas Eschbach
- 1996/1997: Werner Kofler
- 2000/2001: Kurt Drabert
- 2000: Georg Martin Oswald
- 2002/2003: Friederike Kretzen
- 2005/2006: Reinhard Jirgl
- 2007/2008: Werner Fritsch
- 2015/2016: Andreas Maier
- 2018/2019: Georg Klein

== Bibliography ==
=== Novels ===
- Brand's Haide (1951). Brand's Heath
- Schwarze Spiegel (1951). Dark Mirrors
- Aus dem Leben eines Fauns (1953). Scenes from the Life of a Faun
- Das steinerne Herz (1956). The Stony Heart
- KAFF auch Mare Crisium (1960). B/Moondocks
- Nobodaddy's Kinder (1963). Nobodaddy's Children; collects Aus dem Leben eines Fauns, Brand's Haide, Schwarze Spiegel
- Zettels Traum (1970). Bottom's Dream
- Die Schule der Atheisten (1972). The School for Atheists
- Abend mit Goldrand (1975). Evening Edged in Gold
- Julia, oder die Gemälde (unfinished, 1983).

=== Novellas and short stories ===
- Leviathan (1949). Includes: Enthymesis, Gadir, Leviathan
- Die Umsiedler – 2 Prosastudien (1953). Includes: Die Umsiedler (The Displaced) and Alexander
- Seelandschaft mit Pocahontas (1955). Lake Scenery with Pocahontas
- Kosmas oder Vom Berge des Nordens (1955)
- Tina oder über die Unsterblichkeit (1956)
- Goethe und einer seiner Bewunderer (1957)
- Die Gelehrtenrepublik (1957). The Egghead Republic (trans. Michael Horovitz, 1979) and Republica Intelligentsia (trans. John E. Woods, 1994)
- Rosen und Porree (1959). Collects Pocahontas, Die Umsiedler, Alexander and Kosmas
- Kühe in Halbtrauer (1964). Later published as Ländliche Erzählungen (Country Matters)
- Trommler beim Zaren (1966). Short story anthology.

=== Dialogues ===
- Massenbach, Cooper, Brockes, Fouqué, Pape, Schnabel, Europa, Wieland, Meyern, Meisterdiebe, Klopstock, Moritz
- Joyce, May, Stifter, Krakatau, Herder, Vorspiel, Oppermann, Wezel, Kreisschlösser, Müller, Tieck, Schefer, Dickens
- Das Zweite Programm, Joyce, May, Frenssen, Stifter, Gutzkow, Lafontaine, Joyce, Collins, Bulwer-Lytton, Spindler

=== Literary theory ===
- Fouqué und einige seiner Zeitgenossen, biography of Friedrich de la Motte Fouqué, 1958 (2nd, extended ed. 1960)
- Dya Na Sore (1958)
- Belphegor (1961)
- Sitara und der Weg dorthin, biography of Karl May, 1963
- Die Ritter vom Geist (1965)
- Der Triton mit den Sonnenschirm (1969). The Triton with the Parasol

=== English translations ===
- The Egghead Republic – 1979 (Die Gelehrtenrepublik, trans. Michael Horovitz)
- Evening Edged in Gold – 1980 (Abend mit Goldrand, trans. John E. Woods)
- Scenes from the Life of a Faun – 1983 (Aus dem Leben eines Fauns, trans. John E. Woods; revised in 1995)
- Collected Early Fiction, 1949–1964, in four volumes (all trans. John E. Woods):
  - Volume 1: Collected Novellas – 1994; collects Enthymesis (1949), Leviathan (1949), Gadir (1949), Alexander (1953), The Displaced (1953), Lake Scenery with Pocahontas (1955), Cosmas (1955), Tina (1956), Goethe (1957) and Republica Intelligentsia (1957)
  - Volume 2: Nobodaddy's Children – 1995; collects Scenes from the Life of a Faun (1953), Brand's Heath (1951) and Dark Mirrors (1951)
  - Volume 3: Collected Stories – 1996; collects Aus der Inselstraße (Tales from Island Street) (16 stories, 1955–1962), Stürenburg-Geschichten (Stürenburg Stories) (9 stories, 1955–1959), Country Matters (9 stories and the novella Caliban über Setebos (Caliban upon Stetebos), 1960–1964)
  - Volume 4: Two Novels – 1997; collects The Stony Heart (1954) and B/Moondocks (1960)
- Radio Dialogs I – 1999 (trans. John E. Woods)
- The School for Atheists – 2001 (Die Schule der Atheisten, trans. John E. Woods)
- Radio Dialogs II – 2003 (trans. John E. Woods)
- Bottom's Dream – 2016 (Zettels Traum, trans. John E. Woods)
