= Lohvynenko =

Lohvynenko (Ukrainian: Логвиненко), also transliterated Logvynenko or Logvinenko, is a Ukrainian surname. Notable people with the surname include:

- Alina Lohvynenko (born 1990), Ukrainian athlete
- Bohdan Lohvynenko (born 1988), Ukrainian writer
- Oleksiy Logvynenko (1946–2016), Ukrainian translator
- Marina Logvinenko (born 1961), Russian sport shooter
- Yury Logvinenko (born 1988), Kazakhstani footballer
