= Ilium/Olympos =

Science fiction novels by Dan Simmons

Ilium/Olympos is a series of two science fiction novels by Dan Simmons. The events are set in motion by beings who appear to be ancient Greek gods. Like Simmons' earlier series, the Hyperion Cantos, it is a form of "literary science fiction"; it relies heavily on intertextuality, in this case with Homer and Shakespeare as well as references to Marcel Proust's À la recherche du temps perdu (or In Search of Lost Time) and Vladimir Nabokov's novel Ada or Ardor: A Family Chronicle.

As with most of his science fiction and in particular with Hyperion, Ilium demonstrates that Simmons writes in the soft science fiction tradition of Ray Bradbury and Ursula K. Le Guin. Ilium is based on a literary approach similar to most of Bradbury's work, but describes larger segments of society and broader historical events. As in Le Guin's Hainish series, Simmons places the action of Ilium in a vast and complex universe made of relatively plausible technological and scientific elements. Yet Ilium is different from any of the works of Bradbury and Le Guin in its exploration of the very far future of humanity, and in the extra human or post-human themes associated with this. It deals with the concept of technological singularity where technological change starts to occur beyond the ability of humanity to presently predict or comprehend. The first book, Ilium, received the Locus Award for Best Science Fiction novel in 2004.

== Plot introduction ==
The series centers on three main character groups: that of the scholic Hockenberry, Helen and Greek and Trojan warriors from the Iliad; Daeman, Harman, Ada and the other humans of Earth; and the moravecs, specifically Mahnmut the Europan and Orphu of Io. The novels are written in first-person, present-tense when centered on Hockenberry's character, but features third-person, past-tense narrative in all other instances. Much like Simmons' Hyperion where the characters' stories are told over the course of the novels and the actual events serve as a frame, the three groups of characters' stories are told over the course of the novels and their stories do not begin to converge until the end.

== Characters in Ilium/Olympos ==
=== Old-style humans ===
The "old-style" humans of Earth exist at what the post-humans claimed would be a stable, minimum herd population of one million. In reality, their numbers are much smaller than that, around 300,000, because each woman is allowed to have only one child. Their DNA incorporates moth genetics which allows sperm-storage and the choice of father-sperm years after sexual intercourse has actually occurred. This reproductive method causes many children not to know their father, as well as helps to break incest taboos in that the firmary, which controls the fertilization, protects against a child of close relatives being born. The old style humans never appear any older than about 40 since every twenty years they are physically rejuvenated.

- Ada: The owner of Ardis Hall and Harman's lover. She is just past her first twenty. She hosts Odysseus/Noman for his time on Earth.
- Daeman: A pudgy man approaching his second twenty. Both a ladies' man and a lepidopterist. Also terrified of dinosaurs. At the start of Ilium he is a pudgy, immature man-child who wishes to have sex with his cousin (as incest taboos have all but ceased to exist in his society), Ada (whom he had a brief relationship with when she was a teenager), but by the end of the tale he is a mature leader who is very fit and strong. His mother's name is Marina.
- Hannah: Ada's younger friend. Both inventor and artist. Develops a romantic interest in Odysseus.
- Harman: Ada's lover. 99 years old. Only human with the ability to read, other than Savi.
- Savi: The Wandering Jew. The only old-style human not gathered up in the final fax 1,400 years earlier. She has survived the years by spending most of them sleeping in cryo crèches and spending only a few months awake at a time every few decades.

=== Moravecs ===
Named after the roboticist Hans Moravec, they are autonomous, sentient, self-evolving biomechanical organisms that dwell on the Jovian moons. They were seeded throughout the outer Solar System by humans during the Lost Age. Most moravecs are self-described humanists and study Lost Age culture, including literature, television programs and movies.

- Mahnmut the Europan: An explorer of Europa's oceans and skipper of the submersible, The Dark Lady. An amateur Shakespearean scholar.
- Orphu of Io: An armored, 1,200-year-old hard-vac moravec that is shaped not unlike a crab. Weighing eight tons and measuring six meters in length, Orphu works in the sulfur-torus of Io, and is a Proust enthusiast.
- Rockvecs: A subgroup of the moravecs, the rockvecs live on the Asteroid Belt and are more adapted for combat and hostile environments than the moravecs.

=== Scholics ===
Dead scholars from previous centuries who were rebuilt by the Olympian gods from their DNA. Their duties are to observe the Trojan War and report the discrepancies that occur between it and Homer's Iliad.

- Dr. Thomas Hockenberry: Ph.D. in classical studies and a Homeric scholar. Died of cancer in 2006 and is resurrected by the Olympian Gods as a scholic. Lover of Helen of Troy. He is the oldest surviving scholic.
- Dr. Keith Nightenhelser: Hockenberry's oldest friend and a fellow scholic. He is based on the real-life professor of the same name, who was Dan Simmons' roommate at Wabash College and is currently a professor at DePauw University.

=== Others ===
- Achaeans and Trojans: The heroes and minor characters are drawn from Homer's epics, as well as the works of Virgil, Proclus, Pindar, Aeschylus, Euripides, and classical Greek mythology.
- Ariel: A character from The Tempest and the avatar of the evolved, self-aware biosphere. Using locks of Harman's hair, Daeman's hair, and her own hair, Savi makes a deal with Ariel in order that they might pass without being attacked by the calibani.
- Caliban: A monster, son of Sycorax and servant of Prospero, whom John Clute describes as "a cross between Gollum and the alien of Alien." He is cloned to create the calibani, weaker clones of himself. Caliban speaks in strange speech patterns, with much of his dialogue taken from the dramatic monologue "Caliban upon Setebos" by Robert Browning. Simmons chooses not to portray Caliban as the "oppressed but noble native soul straining under the yoke of capitalist-colonial-imperialism" that current interpretations employ to portray him, which he views as "a weak, pale, politically correct shadow of the slithery monstrosity that made audiences shiver in Shakespeare's day ... Shakespeare and his audiences understood that Caliban was a monster – and a really monstrous monster, ready to rape and impregnate Prospero's lovely daughter at the slightest opportunity."
- Odysseus: Odysseus after his Odyssey, ten years older than the Odysseus who fights in the Trojan War. In Olympos, he adopts the name Noman, which is a reference to the name Odysseus gives to Polyphemus the Cyclops on their encounter, in Greek, Outis (Οὖτις), meaning "no man" or "nobody". He is a different entity than the Odysseus on Mars.
- Olympian Gods: Former post-humans who were transformed into gods by Prospero's technology. They do not remember the science behind their technology, save for Zeus and Hephaestus, and they are described both as preliterate and post-literate, for which reason they enlist the services of Thomas Hockenberry and other scholics. They dwell on Olympus Mons on Mars and use quantum teleportation in order to get to the recreation of Troy on an alternate Earth. Though the events of the Trojan War are being recreated with the knowledge of Homer's Iliad, the only ones who know its outcome are the scholics and Zeus as Zeus has forbidden the other gods from knowing.
- Post-humans: Former humans who enhanced themselves far beyond the normal bounds of humanity and dwelt in orbital rings above the Earth until Prospero turned some into Olympian gods. The others were slaughtered by Caliban. They had no need of bodies, but when they took on human form they only took on the shape of women.
- Prospero: A character from The Tempest who is the avatar of the self-aware, post-Internet logosphere, a reference to Vladimir Vernadsky's idea of the noosphere.
- Setebos: Sycorax and Caliban's god. The god is described as "many-handed as a cuttlefish" in reference to "Caliban upon Setebos" by Robert Browning and is described by Prospero as being an "arbitrary god of great power, a September eleven god, an Auschwitz god."
- Sycorax: A witch and Caliban's mother. Also known as Circe, Demyx, and Calypso.
- The Quiet: An unknown entity said to incarnate himself in different forms all across the universe. He is Setebos' nemesis, which could create a kind of God-Against-the Devil picture as Setebos is the background antagonist and Prospero and Ariel, servants of The Quiet, are the background protagonists.
- Zeks: Chlorophyll-based lifeforms originating from the Earth of an alternate universe. Their name comes from a slang term related to the Russian word sharashka, which is a scientific or technical institute staffed with prisoners. The prisoners of these Soviet labor camps were called zeks. (This description of the origin of the term is a mistake of the author. Not only sharashka prisoners were called zeks, it is a common term for all Gulag camp prisoners, derived from the word zaklyuchennyi, inmate. The camp described in the A Day in the Life of Ivan Denisovich is a regular labor camp, not a sharashka.)

== Science of Ilium/Olympos ==
As much of the action derives from fiction involving gods and wizards, Simmons rationalises most of this through his use of far-future technology and science, including:

- String theory: Interdimensional transport is conducted via Brane Holes.
- Nanotechnology provides the gods' immortality and powers, and many of the cybernetic functions possessed by some of the humans.
- Reference to Vladimir Vernadsky's idea of the noosphere is made to explain the origins of powerful entities such as Ariel and Prospero, the former arising from a network of datalogging mote machines, and the latter of whom derives from a post-Internet logosphere.
- Quantum theory and quantum gravity are also used to account for a number of other things, from Achilles' immortality (his mother, Thetis, set the quantum probability for his death to zero for all means of death other than by Paris' bow) to teleportation and shapeshifting powers.
- ARNists use recombinant DNA techniques to resurrect long-dead and prehistoric animals.
- Pantheistic solipsism is used to explain how 'mythical' characters have entered the "real" world.

=== Weapons ===
- Old style humans – Other than flechette rifles scavenged from caches, crossbows are the main form of weapon as old style humans have forgotten almost everything and can only build crossbows.
- Gods – Tasers, energy shields and titanium lances.
- Moravecs – Weapons of mass destruction including the Device, ship-based weapons, kinetic missiles.

== Miscellaneous ==
What follows is a definition of terms that are either used within Ilium or are related to its science, technology and fictional history:

- ARNists: Short for "recombinant RNA artists". ARNists use recombinant DNA techniques to resurrect long-dead and prehistoric animals. Simmons borrows this term from his Hyperion Cantos.
- E-ring/P-ring: Short for "equatorial ring" or "polar ring" respectively. The rings described are not solid, but rather similar to the rings around Jupiter or Saturn: hundreds of thousands of large individual solid elements, built and occupied by the post-humans before Caliban and Prospero were stranded there and Caliban began murdering the post-humans. The rings are visible from the Earth's surface, but the old-style humans do not know exactly what they are.
- Faxnodes: Much as the transporter of Star Trek works, the faxnode system takes a living organism, maps out its structure, breaks down its atoms and assembles a copy at the faxport at the intended destination. This copy is a facsimile, or fax, of the original. Unlike most science-fiction transporter technology, it is revealed late in the story that the matter is not "changed into energy" or "sent" anywhere; a traveler's body is completely destroyed, and re-created from scratch at the destination.
- Final fax: The 9,113 Jews of Savi's time to live through the Rubicon virus are suspended in a fax beam by Prospero and Ariel with the understanding that once the two get the Earth back into order, they will be released.
- Firmary: Short for "infirmary". A room in the e-ring that the humans of Earth fax to every Twenty (every twentieth birthday) for physical rejuvenation, or when hurt or killed in order to be healed. If they were killed, the firmary removes all memory of their death in order to lessen the psychological impact of the event.
- Global Caliphate: An empire that, among other things, attempts to destroy the Jewish population of Earth. They released the Rubicon virus to kill all Jews on Earth as well as programmed the voynix to kill any remaining Jews who escaped the infection.
- Quantum theory and quantum gravity: Used to account for a number of other things, including Achilles' immortality (in that Thetis set the quantum probability for his death to zero for all other means of death other than by Paris' bow), teleportation, and shapeshifting powers.
- Rubicon virus: Created by the Global Caliphate and released with the intention of exterminating those of Jewish descent. It had the reverse effect, killing eleven billion people (ninety-seven percent of the world's population), but Israeli scientists were able to develop an inoculation against the virus and inoculate their own people's DNA, but did not have the time to save the rest of humanity.
- Turin cloth: A cloth used by the people of Earth that, when draped over the eyes, allows them to view the events of the Trojan War, which they believe is just a drama being created for their entertainment. Named after the Shroud of Turin
- Voynix: Named after the Voynich manuscript. The voynix are biomechanical, self-replicating, programmable robots. They originated in an alternate universe, and were brought into the Ilium universe before 3000 A.D. The Global Caliphate somehow gained access to these proto-voynix and after replicating three million of them, battled the New European Union around 3000 A.D. In 3200 A.D., the Global Caliphate upgraded the voynix and programmed them to kill Jews. Using time travel technology acquired from the French (previously used to investigate the Voynich Manuscript and which resulted in the destruction of Paris), the Global Caliphate sent the voynix forward in time to 4600 A.D. Upon their arrival they begin to replicate rapidly in the Mediterranean Basin. As the post-human operations there were put at risk, Prospero and Sycorax created the calibani to fend off the voynix, and eventually Prospero reprogrammed them into inactivation. After the final fax, they were reprogrammed to serve the new old-style humans.

== Literary and cultural influences ==
Simmons references such historical figures, fictional characters and works as Christopher Marlowe, Bram Stoker's Dracula, Plato, Gollum, the Disney character Pluto, Samuel Beckett, and William Butler Yeats' "The Second Coming", among others. As well as referencing these works and figures, he uses others more extensively, shaping his novel by the examples he chooses, such as 9/11 and its effects on the Earth and its nations.

Ilium is thematically influenced by extropianism, peopled as it is with post-humans of the far future. It therefore continues to explore the theme pioneered by H. G. Wells in The Time Machine, a work which is also referenced several times in Simmons' work. One of the most notable references is when the old woman Savi calls the current people of Earth eloi, using the word as an expression of her disgust of their self-indulgent society, lack of culture and ignorance of their past.

Ilium also includes allusions to the work of Nabokov. The most apparent of these are the inclusion of Ardis Hall and the names of Ada, Daeman and Marina, all borrowed from Ada or Ardor: A Family Chronicle. The society that the old-style humans live in also resembles that of Antiterra, a parallel of our Earth circa 19th century, which features a society in which there exists a lack of repression and Christian morality, shown by Daeman's intent to seduce his cousin. Simmons also includes references to Nabokov's fondness for butterflies, such as the butterfly genetics incorporated in the old-style humans and Daeman's enthusiasm as a lepidopterist.

Mahnmut of Europa is identified as a Shakespearean scholar as in the first chapter he is introduced where he analyzes Sonnet 116 in order to send it to his correspondent, Orphu of Io, and it is here that Shakespeare's influence on Ilium begins. Mahnmut's submersible is named The Dark Lady, an allusion to a figure in Shakespeare's sonnets. There is also, of course, The Tempest's presence in the characters of Prospero, Ariel and Caliban. There are also multiple references to other Shakespeare works and characters such as Falstaff, Henry IV, Part 1 and Twelfth Night. Shakespeare makes an appearance in a dream to Mahnmut and quotes from Sonnet 31.

Proustian memory investigations had a heavy hand in the novel's making, which helps explain why Simmons chose Ada or Ardor: A Family Chronicle over something more well-understood of Nabokov's, such as Pale Fire. Ada or Ardor was written in such a structure as to mimic someone recalling their own memories, a subject which Proust explores in his work À la recherche du temps perdu. Orphu of Io is more interested in Proust than Mahnmut's Shakespeare, as he considers Proust "perhaps the ultimate explorer of time, memory, and perception."

Simmons' portrayal of Odysseus speaking to the old-style humans at Ardis Hall is also reminiscent of the Bible's Jesus teaching his disciples. Odysseus is even addressed as "Teacher" by one of his listeners in a way reminiscent of Jesus being addressed as "Rabbi," which is commonly translated as "Teacher".

== Movie adaptation ==
In January 2004, it was announced that the screenplay he wrote for his novels Ilium and Olympos would be made into a film by Digital Domain and Barnet Bain Films, with Simmons acting as executive producer. Ilium is described as an "epic tale that spans 5,000 years and sweeps across the entire solar system, including themes and characters from Homer's The Iliad and Shakespeare's The Tempest."

== Awards and recognition ==
Ilium – Locus Award winner, Hugo Award nominee, 2004 Olympos – Locus Award shortlist, 2006
