= Andrey Logvin =

Russian artist (born 1964)

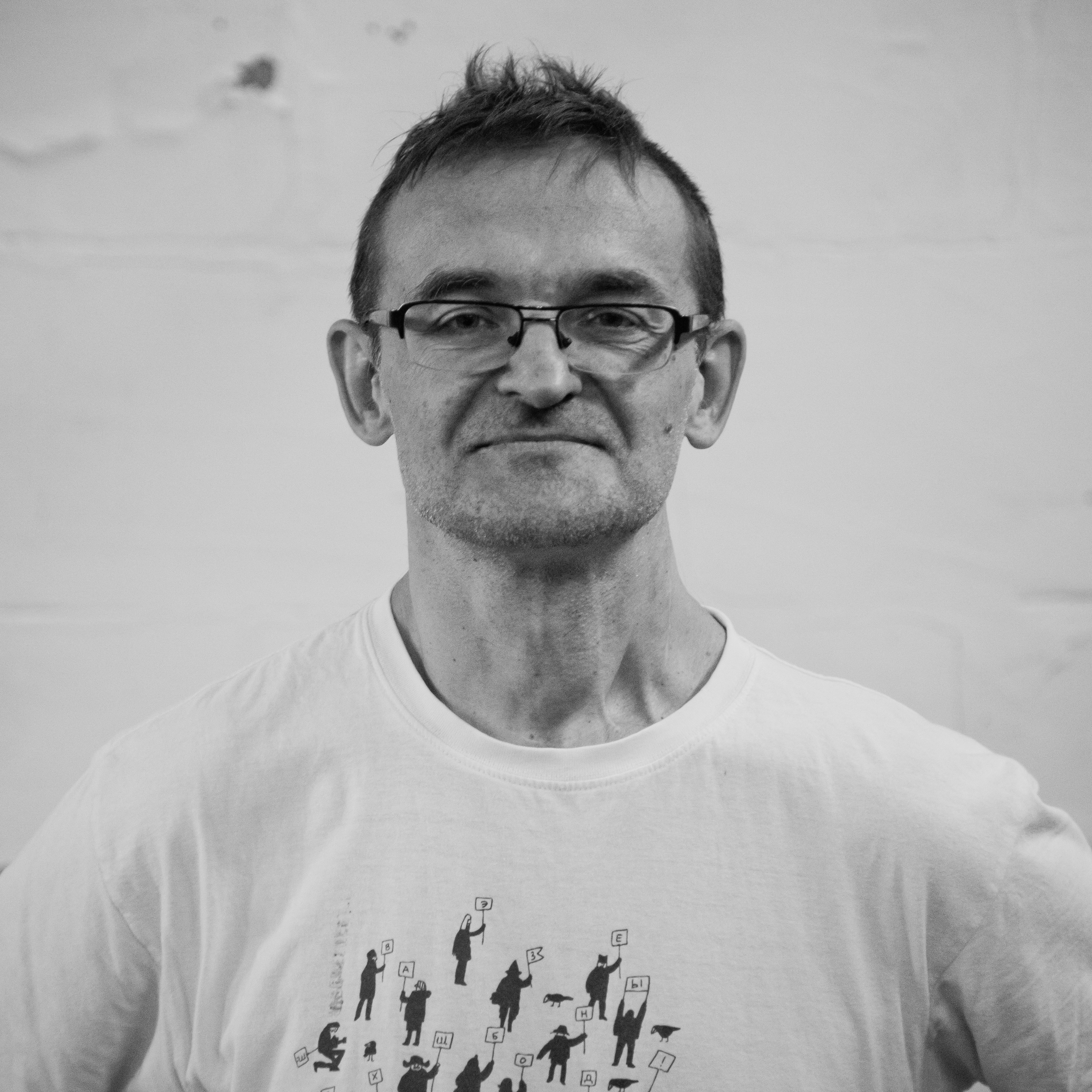
Logvin in 2016

Andrey Logvin (Russian: Логвин Андрей Николаевич; born April 4, 1964) is a Soviet and Russian poster artist, graphic artist, designer in the sphere of graphic design and advertising. He is known for the poster "Life Is a Success".

== Biography ==
In 1999 Logvin began teaching at the Higher Academic School of Graphic Design. In 2001 he received the State Prize of the Russian Federation in the field of literature and art for the year 2000.

== Awards ==
=== Grand prix ===
- 1992 — Grand Prix of I International Poster Biennale in Moscow
- 2006 – Grand Prix of 17th Poster Festival in Chaumont in France for the poster "Life Is a Success" (for "Museum Night" in Krasnoyarsk Museum Center)
