= Köttelbeck =

River in Germany

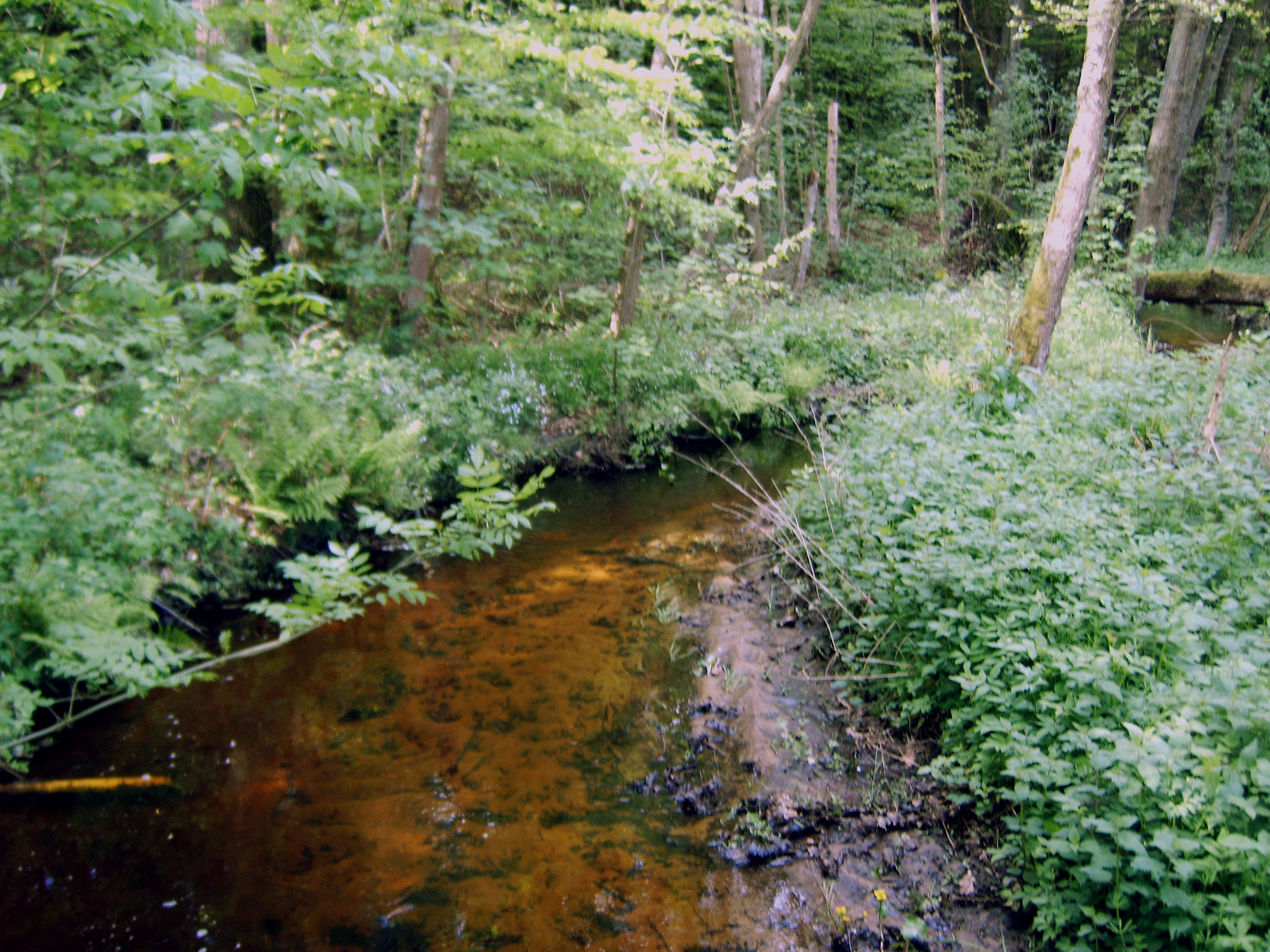

Location
- Country: Germany
- States: Lower Saxony

Physical characteristics
- Mouth
  - location: Lutter
  - coordinates: 52.7008°N 10.3447°E

Basin features
- Progression: Lutter→ Lachte→ Aller→ Weser→ North Sea

Köttelbeck is a small river of Lower Saxony, Germany. It flows into the Lutter near Eldingen.

== See also ==
- List of rivers of Lower Saxony
