= Hans Wollschläger =

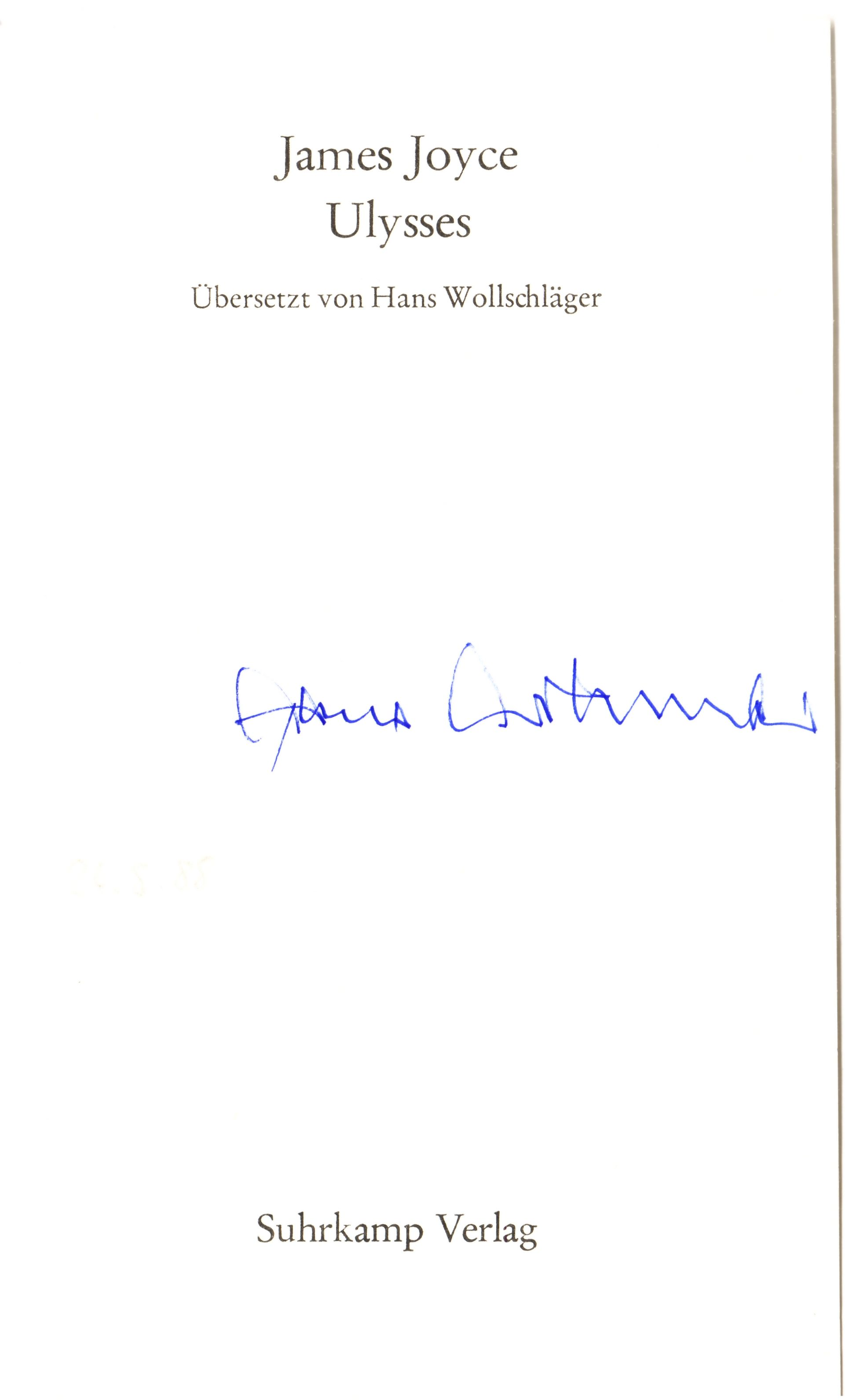
Signature, 1988

Hans Wollschläger (17 March 1935, in Minden – 19 May 2007, in Bamberg) was a German writer, translator, historian, and editor of German literature.

== Biography ==
Wollschläger is widely known as the translator of Ulysses by James Joyce, commissioned by Suhrkamp Verlag after the reputation of previous translations had been tarnished. His translation took on "canonical and cult status" for German readers of Joyce. He also translated the complete works of Edgar Allan Poe (together with Arno Schmidt), and novels by Raymond Chandler and Dashiell Hammett. He was vice chairman of the Karl-May-Gesellschaft (Karl May society) and was one of the editors of the historical critical edition of this author.

He wrote several books of fiction and non-fiction, including a history of the Crusades which has a polemical aspect (at the close of the book he suggests the Catholic Church be declared a criminal organisation, and Pope Urban II as a mass murderer) but also contains excerpts from several Arabic sources never previously translated into German.

Originally Hans Wollschläger had studied music. He wrote three symphonies which have never been performed in public. He also worked on a performing edition of the draft of Gustav Mahler's unfinished Tenth Symphony, which he never completed. However, under the influence of Erwin Ratz, Wollschläger came to the conclusion that an unfinished masterwork should not be touched, and publicly withdrew his edition in 1962.

== Selected works ==
- Karl May (1965, 1976, 2004)
- Die bewaffneten Wallfahrten gen Jerusalem (1970, 1973)
- Nacht-Stücke (1974)
- Die Gegenwart einer Illusion (1978)
- Herzgewächse oder Der Fall Adams (1982)
- Von Sternen und Schnuppen (1984)
- In diesen geistfernen Zeiten (1986)
- "Tiere sehen dich an" oder das Potential Mengele (1987).
- Bannkreis der Besseren Heimat (1990)
- Denn es gehet dem Menschen wie dem Vieh: Wie dies stirbt, so stirbt er auch (2001)
- Moments musicaux. (2005)
