= Caliban over Setebos =

Short story by Arno Schmidt

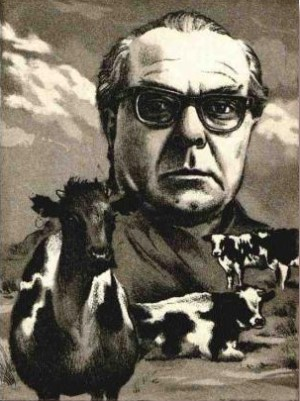
Arno Schmidt with "Cows in Half-Mourning", the title of the volume of stories. Engraving by Jens Rusch

"Caliban over Setebos" is a short story by the German writer Arno Schmidt. It was first published in 1964 as the conclusion of the ten stories in the volume Kühe in Halbtrauer.

== Plot ==
"Caliban over Setebos" tells how the poet Georg Düsterhenn travels to a Lower Saxony village to see his childhood sweetheart again. However, he feels repulsed by her, observes lesbian group sex on his nightly departure and narrowly escapes the angry women who have discovered him. These burlesque adventures are depicted against the backdrop of the ancient Orpheus myth. There are numerous other allusions to ancient myths as well as to works by Robert Burns, Robert Browning, James Joyce and others.

Georg Düsterhenn travels by bus to the village of Schadewalde, which is supposed to be located in the border zone of Lower Saxony. There he wants to meet his childhood crush Fiete Methe again, in order to "decisively & irresistibly make himself schmaltzy" for a volume of poetry that will be an economic failure and thus reduce his taxable income. During an evening walk, he observes children running with lanterns, meets the Holocaust survivor H. Levy, who is on his way in his car to stock the condom machines in the area, and observes the sexual intercourse between the inn waitress Rieke and the farmhand. In the village inn, he discovers an old jug, which he buys from the innkeeper O. Tulp with Swiss gold francs. He then spends a local round of brandy. Düsterhenn realizes that Rieke is actually the Fiete he is looking for and asks her to show him to his room. However, he does not dare to reveal himself to her, and since he has potency problems, a masturbation also fails. Düsterhenn escapes from the inn at night and observes lesbian group sex in the barn between four "hunters" whom he had already met at the bus stop and in the inn. A sneeze gives him away and he is pursued by the four women and the innkeeper's dog until he is rescued by the Jewish condom salesman in his car.

== Origin ==
The idea for the story came to Schmidt on March 26, 1963, when he came across his friend Eberhard Schlotter's picture cycle "Orpheus". The working title was "Orfeus". Schlotter himself had been inspired to create the cycle by a disillusioning encounter with a former lover who had aged considerably. He told Schmidt about this. During their conversation, the Orpheus story came to mind.

Schmidt wrote the text from April to May 1963 in the Heideorf Bargfeld, where he had lived since 1958. He used over 1000 pieces of paper on which he had jotted down ideas, formulations and quotations for the text of 63 to 90 printed pages.

== Themes ==
The text is an example of Schmidt's psychoanalytic-oriented etymological theory, developed shortly before. It is considered "the literary masterpiece" among Schmidt's shorter works.

As in all of Schmidt's narrative works, Caliban über Setebos centers on a dominant first-person narrator who represents an alter ego of his author. Here it is the poet Georg Düsterhenn, who, like Schmidt, comes from Hamburg-Hamm, has Lower Silesian-lausitz roots, is an atheist and spent Second World War as a typing pool soldier in Norway. Düsterhenn's youthful works are attributed to Schmidt (a verse poem about the Persian explorer Sataspes as well as the surviving Pharos oder von der Macht der Dichter), and like Schmidt, even in his more mature years Düsterhenn could not get a woman out of his head whom he fancied as a grammar school pupil but never dared to speak to: In Caliban über Setebos she is called Fiete Methe, for Schmidt it was the Görlitz pupil Hanne Wulff, who was the model for numerous girl or woman characters in Schmidt's work. The Germanist Sabine Kyora therefore believes that the first-person narrator in Caliban über Setebos is virtually identical to its author. As Wolfgang Albrecht shows, there are striking differences between the two: Unlike all of Schmidt's other protagonists, Düsterhenn is small and slight, he is wealthy, despises the Enlightenment and, as a hit song writer, is not an author to be taken seriously, but an "opportunistic trivial writer". Jörg Drews points out that Schmidt wrote himself in the third person in the text: Düsterhenn recalls a fellow writer "'Dagegen=SCHMIDT'", who "drew his meagre living from the character role of the 'Good Left Man'" but, because he refused to meet the demands of his audience, would never make it to prosperity. Düsterhenn is the result of a lengthy thought experiment about what would happen if he gave up his literary pretensions and wrote in a more marketable way.

The story is divided into nine parts, each of which bears the name of one of the nine Muses as its title. These fit in one way or another with the content of the story: Thus, the evening walk through the village is headed Urania, the muse of stargazing; Melpomene, the muse of tragedy, stands above Düsterhenn's disappointing and disappointing encounter with Fiete-Rieke. Often, however, the area of responsibility of the muse mentioned is also in an ironic relationship to the events: The lesbian orgy is found in the Terpsichore chapter, the muse of Reigentanz; the burlesque escape at the end in the Thalia chapter, the muse of Comedy, which in ancient understanding is defined by its happy ending; the rough sex act between Fiete-Rieke and the house servant in the chapter Erato, who was responsible for rather tender Love poetry. The text is preceded by a motto, which parodies in phonetic English an epigram dedicated to Herodotus from the Anthologia Graeca, whose historical work is divided into nine books named after the muses.

For long stretches, the text reflects the inner monologue Düsterhenn's ruminations, his memories and associations of what he sees, hears and experiences. In doing so, he usually comments on the material-landscape environment more lovingly than on his fellow human beings, for whom he often finds only disillusioning, mocking or even resentment-laden words. Schmidt consistently ignores the rules of orthography: Not only is the respective dialect of the characters imitated, but the chosen spelling exhausts the sound and meaning possibilities of a word. Frequently, quotations are interspersed in the text, sometimes overtly, sometimes covertly, which sometimes originate from Middle High German, English or the Old Languages. This results in numerous opportunities for puns, punchlines and surprising secondary meanings. Schmidt himself wrote to the literary scholar Jörg Drews on September 23, 1964:

Have you noticed that the 'Setebos' is an 'Orfeus'? I have taken the liberty of singing in two voices. With 3,000 fioriturs & pralltrillers, which required considerable art & effort.

— Schmidt,

The deliberate polysemy of his language has its origins in Schmidt's etymology theory, which was fed by his encounter with psychoanalysis Sigmund Freud. According to this theory, the unconscious expresses itself linguistically in ambiguities, wordplay, assonance, etc., in order to simultaneously convey - mostly sexual - meanings in addition to the manifest level of meaning. In order to master this language, however, the speaker must have attained a certain age impotence that allows him to be at least partially free of the drives of the id, which he can thus neither repress nor sublimation, but rather allow to play out in a controlled manner: "One can therefore now understand oneself with this Caliban", Schmidt later formulated in Zettel's Traum. The stories in the volume Kühe in Halbtrauer and, in particular, Caliban über Setebos can thus be understood as attempts to apply this theory to his own literary work.

== Reference texts ==
As the literary scholar Friedhelm Rathjen notes, Caliban over Setebos seems disintegrated: It is not immediately clear to the reader what sense the various elements of the plot make. The reason for this is that the intertextuality narrative is linked to several other texts without this link being explicitly reflected in the text. Only when these links are discovered and made explicit can the levels of meaning of Caliban über Setebos be deciphered.

=== Robert Browning ===
The title of the story quotes Caliban upon Setebos. Or, Natural Theology in the Island, the title of a poem by the English poet Robert Browning, published in 1864. In it, Browning has the fierce, ugly Caliban from Shakespeare's The Tempest' to reflect on Setebos, his god also mentioned in Shakespeare. He imagines him to be arbitrary, malicious and vengeful, projecting these qualities from himself onto the deity projection (psychoanalysis). This poem is alluded to in the text of the story when Düsterhenn reflects on what he considers to be the inferior quality of the universe: "but most of it was pretty stupid. Of course there were some good parts in the universe now and then, but the majority of sete Boss's products were fusch=work." In this sense, the title stands for a radical negation of theodicy. Schmidt also uses the figure of Setebo in two essays written around the same time to allude to the flawed nature of creation. An evil God who does not care about the suffering of his creatures was already a theme in his 1949 story Leviathan and in the title Nobodaddy's Kinder, under which his short novel Brand's Haide, Aus dem Leben eines Fauns and Schwarze Spiegel were published as a trilogy in 1963. Nobodaddy, a portmanteau of English nobody - "no one" and daddy - "papa", was a term used by the poet William Blake for God. The fact that Düsterhenn accuses his parents of having "brought such a mooncalf into the world" can be understood as an implied identification with Caliban, as Caliban is apostrophized as a mooncalf in Shakespeare's Tempest. Schmidt took the concept of an evil demiurge from late antique gnosis, to which Düsterhenn's disgust for everything corporeal and his refusal to procreate also refer.

=== Orpheus ===
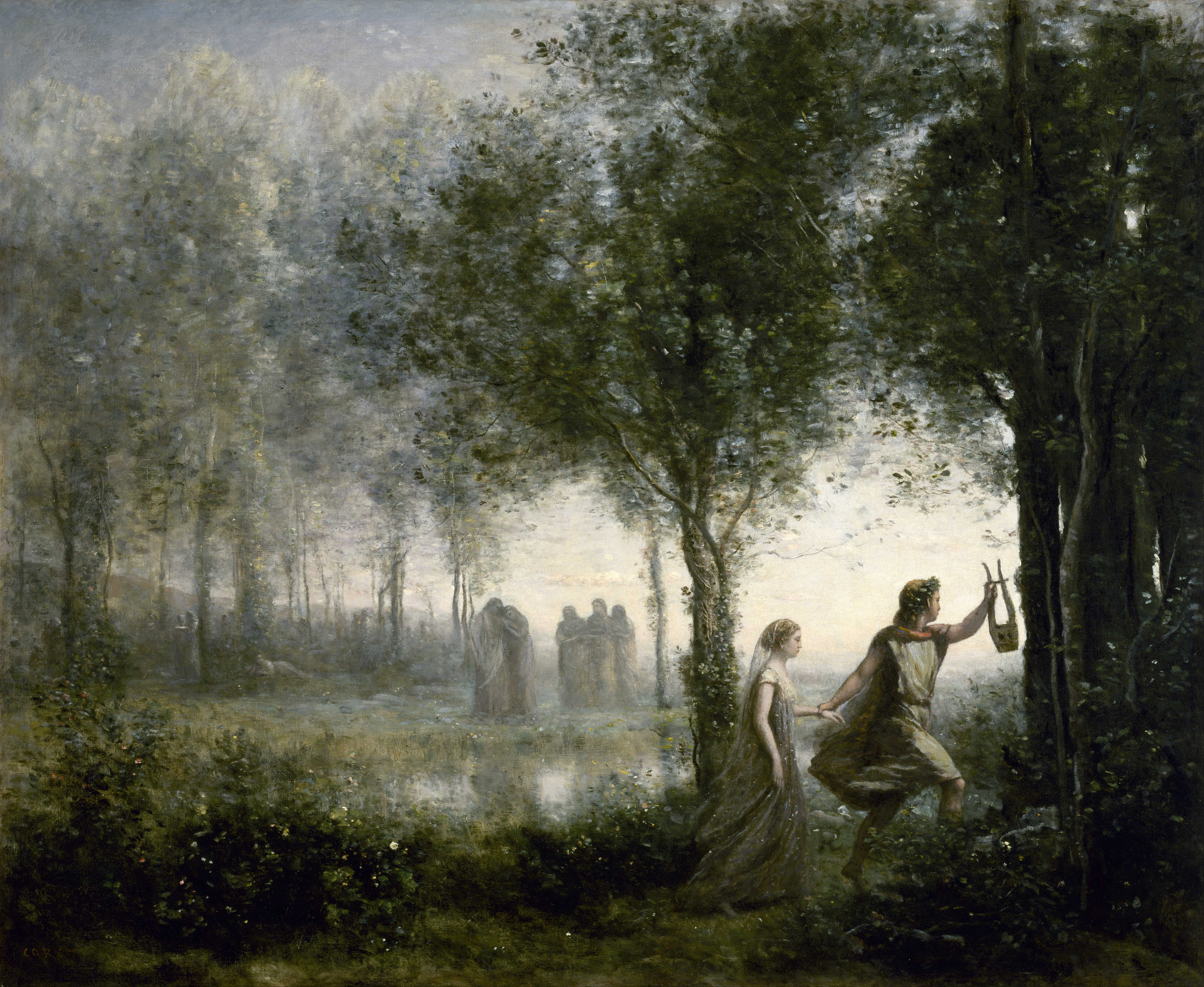
Orpheus leading Eurydice from the underworld (oil painting by Jean-Baptiste Camille Corot; 1861)

Caliban over Setebos is a replica of the ancient myth of Orpheus. The latter travels to the underworld to bring his wife Eurydice, who died young, back to life; Düsterhenn travels to Schadewalde - the place name, which is actually Silesian, alludes to the "shadows" as which the dead lived on in the ancient imagination, as well as to the classical philologist and Homer translator Wolfgang Schadewaldt (1900-1974). Instead of a lyre, he, a poet-singer, always carries the Peregrinus Syntax, a rhyming lexicon of the 19th century.

"green pale his 'H' of the face"

The fact that the journey means a trip to Hades is hinted at in the very first pages of the story: the place name Schadewalde contains Hades anagramatically. In the sign for the bus stop, Düsterhenn's "green-pale 'H' of the face" catches the eye, the fare is an obolus - this coin was given to the dead to pay the ferryman Charon for his crossing of the Styx, the Kötelbeck, a small stream at the entrance to the village, has a "stügisch" effect and "'Der Erste Schiffer'" himself makes an appearance in the form of a man urinating by the wayside. In dieser Art ist die Erzählung dicht durchsetzt mit Anspielungen auf den Mythos.

The names of the characters also refer to the Orpheus legend: Düsterhenn's first name alludes to Virgil's Georgica, in whose fourth book it is told. The fact that Düsterhenn, who despised the peasants, was given the first name Georg (ancient Greek for "peasant") is a side point; the short form "Orje" is homonymous with orgy, as celebrated by the maenads, the murderesses of Orpheus. Orje also refers to them phonetically, just as Rieke refers to Eurydice. The relationship between the two is changed by Schmidt, however, because in Caliban über Setebos it is not the man who leads the woman, but vice versa (namely up a narrow staircase to Düsterhenn's room in the inn), and it is not he who looks around at her, but she at him. If you read the name of the innkeeper O. Tulp backwards, the god of the dead Pluto comes out; at the same time, he also stands for the god Dionysus, because he serves intoxicating drinks and is addressed by the "slayers" as "Liber pater" (the Interpretatio Romana of Dionysus). He calls his wife, who corresponds to the ancient Persephone, "Olsche": by changing the syllables, you get "Sheol", the name of the underworld used in the Tanakh. Tulp's dog is called Kirby, which sounds like a diminutive of Kerberos, the hound of hell. Heracles makes his appearance as a stablehand (since he mucked out the Augean stable), and the "very large egg" that he places on the dung heap during a post-coital bowel evacuation is reminiscent of the world egg of the Orphic Hymn. The lesbians who hunt Düsterhenn have their counterpart in the maenads who are said to have literally torn Orpheus to pieces. Schmidt describes the dildo used in their orgy as a thyrsos. At the same time, they are depicted as Erinnyes, which is shown by the names Alex (Alekto) and Meg (Megaira) as well as the portmanteau word "Jägerynnien". H. Levy, who chauffeurs Düsterhenn on his escape from the village, is portrayed as a Jew; Bernd Rauschenbach recognizes in him a portrait of Schmidt's Jewish brother-in-law Rudy Kiesler, who fled to the US with his wife from the National Socialists in 1933. Ralf Georg Czapla interprets the figure via the associations Hebrew and Hebron as an allusion to Hebros, the river into which the Maenads threw Orpheus' head. Still singing, he was driven to the beach on the island of Lesbos, which is why the story ends with Düsterhenn's reflection: "In the end, only the head of a decent person remains alive!"

Schmidt not only uses the ancient Orpheus myth, however, but also its receptions in the 19th and 20th centuries: Thus the condom representative H. Levy recalls Ludovic Halévy, the librettist of Jacques Offenbach's operetta Orpheus in the Underworld from 1858. Rainer Maria Rilke's solemn Sonnets to Orpheus, written in 1922, are quoted and comically reinterpreted above all in faecal language or obscene passages, for example in the description of the sex act between Rieke-Fiete and the house servant: sonnets 2/IV (the "unicorn"), 2/VII ("between the streaming poles of feeling fingers") and 1/XVII ("See, the machine, how it rolls and avenges itself and disfigures and weakens us" - in Schmidt: "him disfigured & weakened") are quoted there.

Stefan Jurczyk also recognizes references in the story to the ancient myths of Pentheus and Actaion, who were torn apart by maenads and dogs respectively after watching scenes that were forbidden to the male eye.

=== James Joyce ===
Schmidt adopted the poetological principle of basing a narrative set in the present on an ancient myth, which is contrasted and satirized by the sometimes profane or burlesque content, from his role model James Joyce. In his Ulysses, published in 1922, a single day of the Dublin advertiser Leopold Bloom on the backdrop of Homer's Odyssey. Joyce himself is mentioned twice by name in Caliban over Setebos - once for his alleged ability to reconstruct a family's history from their dirty laundry, then Düsterhenn imagines an encounter with the man who died in 1941, paraphrasing the thought of his own death. The idea of being allowed to serve posthumously as the great Irishman's warden in a kind of poetry Olympus reappears in the final escape scene, only instead of Joyce, it says "the High Name" - similar to the Jewish ban on pronouncing the God's name. According to Jörg Drews, this does not refer to Joyce, but to Sigmund Freud, whom Schmidt had recently discovered for himself. In Caliban über Setebos, reverence is paid to him, among other things, with a reminiscence of a reader of Friedrich Rückert's supposedly erotic poem Der Ehebrecher: In reality, the poem is called The Cup of Honor and contains no sexual content whatsoever - a classic Freudian blunder; on the other hand, the story teems with allusions to Freud's 1908 essay Character and Analeroticism, which Schmidt had read shortly before writing it.

Echoes of Ulysses itself can be found in two or three places: Cyclops Chapter, in which Bloom narrowly escapes from a violent nationalist, is reminiscent of Düsterhenn's escape from the lesbians, as is Bloom's escape from the brothel in Circe Chapter. Bloom's masturbation in Nausikaa Chapter has parallels with Düsterhenn's voyeurism in the barn.

The textual references to Finnegans Wake and its reference texts are clearer, especially to the opening chapter of the second book The Mime of Mick, Nick and the Maggies, from which Schmidt takes several allusions and puns. At the plot level, the chapter is about two boys who play riddles with girls outside their parents' pub in the evening and are called in, motifs that are echoed in Schmidt's work in Tulp's pub and the children's evening lantern walk. Joyce uses the biblical myth of Jacob and Esau as a reference text, to which Schmidt also refers: As "ä sow in her hide", through the continuous hunting motif, which refers to Esau, as well as through the characterization of Düsterhenn as a trickster, which makes him comparable to the biblical Jacob. The reference becomes even clearer in the ballad Tam o' Shanter by Robert Burns from 1791, which Joyce borrows from and which Schmidt also alludes to. In it, the protagonist observes a Witches' Sabbath at which he is particularly struck by a witch in an overly short petticoat, the proverbial "cutty sark". The witches discover him and he narrowly manages to escape them, although his horse Meg loses its tail in the process. The girls taking part in the game ("the maggies") and the "widow Megrievy" mentioned in the same chapter have the same name in Joyce's work, and Schmidt calls one of the four lesbians by this name. In the prose version of the saga, Burns emphasizes Tam's mistake of having turned around after the light of the witches' feast - the motif of turning around, of returning, of unsuccessful repetition is also central to Orpheus and to Caliban over Setebos.

=== Further reference levels ===
==== Egyptian mythology ====
Werner Schwarze discovers in Caliban über Setebos not only allusions to classical ancient mythology, but also to that of the Egyptians: Thus, the goddess of death Hathor can be recognized as well as Isis, who already played a role in the story Kundian Harness, also contained in the volume Cows in Semi-Mourning, or the creator god Ptah. This interpretation is doubted by Stefan Jurczyk, who does not consider Schwarze's evidence - often only word components or assonances - to be viable.

==== Karl May ====
Karl May, on whose texts Schmidt had tested his etymological theory (Sitara und der Weg dorthin, published in 1963, the year Caliban über Setebos was written), receives a covert citation when Düsterhenn's kitschy, amateurish poetry is presented in the Urania chapter. Here, the poet sits by the wayside in the moonlight and, struggling with the meter, composes verses that fit his situation: "It was in the forest. The trees were all asleep". In Wahrheit handelt es sich um den Anfang von Mays 1900 entstandenem Gedicht Des Waldes Seele. Jörg Drews believes that this cryptomnetic theft of intellectual property Düsterhenn should also be characterized as Hermes, the god of thieves.

==== Wilhelm Busch ====
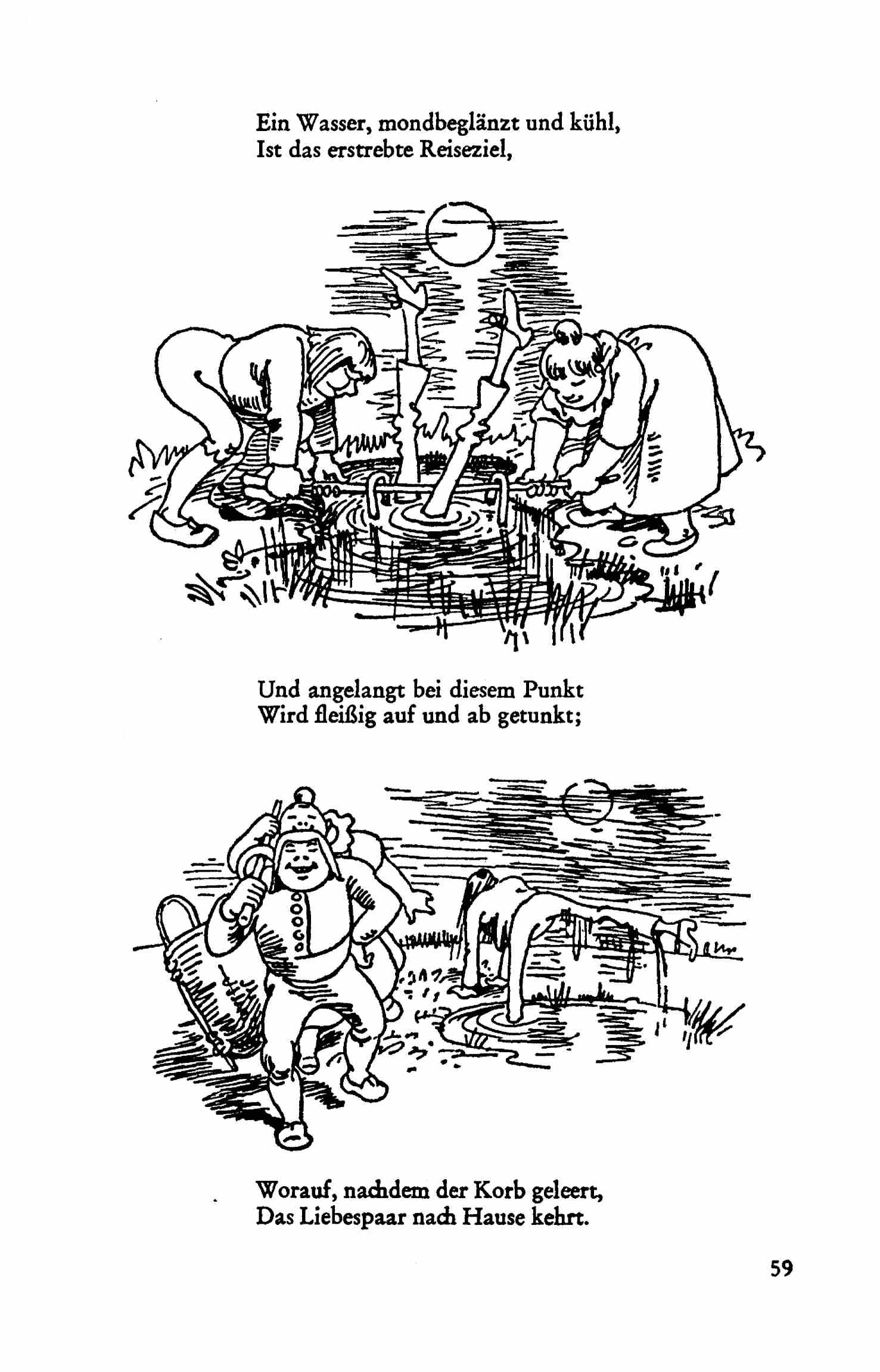
Rieke Mistelfink and her friend, the servant Krischan, mistreat the poet. Wilhelm Busch: Balduin Bählamm, the thwarted poet

Caliban über Setebos also has echoes of Wilhelm Busch's picture story Balduin Bählamm, der verhinderte Dichter from 1883: Here, too, a poet seeks inspiration for further creative work in the countryside; here, too, an approach to a "Rieke", who is in a relationship with a farmhand, fails; here, too, the poet fails in a burlesque manner, both erotically and poetically.

==== Thorne Smith ====
Friedhelm Rathjen recognizes several allusions in Caliban over Setebos to the novel The Night Life of the Gods by the American popular writer Thorne Smith. In this novel, published in 1931, the protagonist befriends the Megaera, who can not only petrify living creatures, but also bring statues to life. Together they bring the images of the Roman gods in New York's Metropolitan Museum of Art to life and experience a number of adventures with them. According to Rathjen, it is not only the name Meg/Megäre that suggests Schmidt's use, but also the theme of the lifeless, almost petrified people that Düsterhenn encounters in Schadewalde, not least Rieke, whose broad face he describes as lifeless, "cast-iron".

==== Politicians of the Federal Republic of Germany ====
According to the Germanist Rudi Schweikert, the name Düsterhenn refers to the conservative Catholic CDU politician Adolf Süsterhenn from Rhineland-Palatinate. Schmidt had moved from this federal state to the more liberal Hesse in 1955 after his short novel Seelandschaft mit Pocahontas had earned him criminal proceedings for blasphemy and distribution of lewd writings. Süsterhenn was president of the Rhineland-Palatinate Higher Administrative Court during this time and was also regarded as a "strict moralizer and guardian of morals" in the following period. The fact that the protagonist of a story teeming with crude descriptions of sexual acts almost had the same name seemed like "extreme back-stabbing according to the motto 'Now (after the "Pocahontas" affair) more than ever'". Further commentaries on the politics of the Federal Republic of Germany can be found in connection with the television program running in Tulp's parlour. This is about the Debate about the Adenauer succession, which was current at the time of writing:

'Our chancellor loves roses. [...] If only we knew what Foreign Minister loves. Or BRENTANO. Because EHRHARDT didn't get his turn anyway; let's not kid ourselves.

—

The question of what Brentano, highlighted in small capitals, might love is an allusion to the rumors about the CDU politician's homosexuality - in keeping with the themes of the story, in which not only female homosexuality plays a role, but also in the relationship between Düsterhenn and H. Levy ("Hauptsache er'ss nich direkt schwul") latently masculine as well, for example when Düsterhenn jumps into the open back of Levy's car at the end.

== Interpretations ==
Robert Wohlleben assumes that Schmidt wrote Caliban über Setebos as a model for his readers in order to make clear how his multireferential etymological texts should be read. In KAFF auch Mare Crisium from 1960, he had worked with text foils for the first time in a Joycian manner, namely with the Nibelungensage and the myth of El Cid: "The non-participation of the readership exceeded the boldest expectations". By so obviously basing his Düsterhenn story on the Orpheus myth, Schmidt wanted to educate his readers to read in multiple dimensions - as a preliminary exercise to Zettel's dream.

Jörg Drews sees the story as paradigmatic for Schmidt's turn towards a pessimistic world view in which sex and greed rule the world unchangingly. It went hand in hand with a "work on myth" in the sense of Hans Blumenberg, i.e. with a constant retelling of the same old story. The aspect that Schmidt uses to make this mythical narrative current and relevant to the present is Freud's psychoanalysis. At the plot level of the mythical tale Caliban über Setebos, the protagonist frees himself from at least one bond, namely sexuality, by fleeing from Schadewalde.

Stefan Jurczyk also interprets the narrative as "work on myth". In ever new reflections, basic anthropological problems such as the relationship between Eros and death or the male fear of women are allegorically circled. This polysemantic procedure collides with Schmidt's depth psychological etymological theory, which attempts to reduce everything to a single meaning, namely the sex drive. In the narrative, however, this proves to be just another "symbolic world" among many, with which the individual illustrates the otherwise mute, meaningless and irrational reality.

Schmidt's biographer Wolfgang Martynkewicz assumes that Schmidt's aim with Caliban über Setebos was to have fun juggling with the findings of a popular-scientific psychoanalysis and with set pieces of mythological material. On January 19, 1964, Schmidt explained in a letter to his editor Ernst Krawehl why he no longer wanted to emphasize the mythological parts of the story typographically, as originally planned: "Fucking myth! People should have fun!"

Ralf Georg Czapla understands Caliban über Setebos and the other nine prose pieces from the volume Kühe in Halbtrauer as attempts at the newly developed prose form Traum, which Schmidt had announced in 1956 in his Berechnungen II but had not realized. In the figure of the impotent, trivial and money-hungry (psychoanalytically interpreted: anal fixation) Düsterhenn, the writer Schmidt and his attitude to his bread work are reflected in sharp self-criticism. In the dream logic of the narrative, Düsterhenn as an id is to be equated with the wild, ugly Caliban, who rails against Setebos, his superego, which appears in the narrative in the form of a European high culture influenced by antiquity. It is de-idealized, trivialized, vulgarized and ridiculed at every opportunity. Joyce is presented as the new ideal, as whose cupbearer and servant the dreaming self imagines itself to be.

Marius Fränzel places the underlying Orpheus myth at the center of his interpretation: according to him, the story is about a "monomaniacal loner" on a "journey into the past", but he himself is not clear about its deeper motivation: Düsterhenn is a deluded man.

Peter Habermehl, on the other hand, sees in Caliban über Setebos the story of a liberation, both in sexual and poetological terms. The impotence that has become apparent allows Düsterhenn a distanced, observant attitude towards sexuality in the sense of the etymological theory (this is the meaning of voyeurism in the Terpsichore chapter); he is no longer at the mercy of his urges: At the end of the plot, he describes himself as "ä sädder änd a veiser Männ" (this is a quote from Samuel Coleridge's ballad The Rime of the Ancient Mariner). At the same time, Düsterhenn also freed himself from poetry - he lost his rhyming lexicon during his escape - so that in future he could depict in prose what had previously been repressed, describe the world realistically and without kitsch as what he was convinced it was: a "Uni= sive Perversum", senseless "Fusch=Werk". As a prose writer, he would then be able to "create a superior world, because it is orderly and saved in its humor".

== Expenditure ==
Caliban over Setebos is included in the following works:

- Arno Schmidt: Kühe in Halbtrauer. Stahlberg Verlag, Karlsruhe 1964, p. 226–316, (Reprint im S. Fischer Verlag, Frankfurt am Main 1985, ISBN 3-10-070615-3).
- Arno Schmidt: Orpheus. Fünf Erzählungen. (= Fischer TB 1133). S. Fischer Verlag, Frankfurt am Main 1970, ISBN 3-436-01283-1.
- Arno Schmidt: Ländliche Erzählungen. (= Bargfelder Ausgabe. Werkgruppe 1. Romane, Erzählungen, Gedichte, Juvenilia. Band 3/2). An edition of the Arno Schmidt Foundation published by Haffmans Verlag, Zurich 1987, ISBN 3-251-80010-8, p. 475–538.
- Arno Schmidt: Erzählungen. S. Fischer Verlag, Frankfurt am Main 1994, p. 467–544.
- Arno Schmidt: Über die Unsterblichkeit. Erzählungen und Essays. Edited by Jan Philipp Reemtsma. Suhrkamp, Frankfurt am Main 2009, pp. 193–261, ISBN 3-518-42123-9.

== Literature ==
- Ralf Georg Czapla: Mythos, Sexus und Traumspiel. Arno Schmidts Prosazyklus »Kühe in Halbtrauer«. Igel Verlag, Paderborn 1993, ISBN 3-927104-35-3.
- Jörg Drews: Caliban Casts Out Ariel. Zum Verhältnis von Mythos und Psychoanalyse in Arno Schmidts Erzählung ›Caliban über Setebos‹. In: Derselbe (Hrsg.): Gebirgslandschaft mit Arno Schmidt. Das Grazer Symposion 1980. edition text + kritik, München 1982, p. 45–65.
- Peter Habermehl: Orfeus in Niedersaxn. Arno Schmidts Erzählung «Caliban über Setebos». In: Antike und Abendland. Band 53, 2007, p. 190–205.
- Stefan Jurczyk: Symbolwelten. Studien zu „Caliban über Setebos“ von Arno Schmidt.2nd edition. Igel Verlag, Hamburg 2010, ISBN 978-3-89621-228-3.
- Friedhelm Rathjen: Smithereens. Zum Nach(t)leben von James Joyce, Robert Burns und Thorne Smith in »Caliban über Setebos«. In: Robert Weninger (Hrsg.): Wiederholte Spiegelungen. Elf Aufsätze zum Werk Arno Schmidts. (= Bargfelder Bote, Sonderlieferung). edition text & kritik, Richard Boorberg Verlag, Stuttgart 2003, ISBN 3-88377-737-4, p. 129–154.
- Robert Wohlleben: Götter und Helden in Niedersachsen. Über das mythologische Substrat des Personals in «Caliban über Setebos». In: Bargfelder Bote, Lieferung 3 (1973), p. 3–14 (online).
