= John E. Woods (translator) =

American translator (1942–2023)

John Edwin Woods (August 16, 1942 – February 15, 2023) was an American translator who specialized in translating German literature, since about 1978. His work includes much of the fictional prose of Arno Schmidt and the works of contemporary authors such as Ingo Schulze and Christoph Ransmayr. He also translated the four major novels of Thomas Mann, as well as works by many other German writers.

== Early life and education ==
Woods was born in Indianapolis, Indiana, and lived with a foster family in Fort Wayne Indiana until 1949. He attended Wittenberg University, then studied English literature at Cornell and the Lutheran Theological Seminary at Gettysburg, Pennsylvania. He learned German at the Goethe-Institute, and married his teacher, Dr. Ulrike Dorda. Woods lived for many years in California before moving to Berlin in 2005.

== Selected translations ==
=== Alfred Döblin ===
- A People Betrayed
- Karl and Rosa

=== Doris Dörrie ===
- Love, Pain, and the Whole Damn Thing
- What Do You Want from Me?

=== Friedrich Dürrenmatt ===
- A Monster Lecture on Justice and Law
- The Execution of Justice

=== Günter Grass ===
- Show Your Tongue

=== Thomas Mann ===
- Joseph und seine Brüder: Joseph and His Brothers
- Der Zauberberg: The Magic Mountain
- Doktor Faustus: Doctor Faustus
- Buddenbrooks: Buddenbrooks

=== Libuše Moníková ===
- Die Fassade: The Façade

=== Wilhelm Raabe ===
- Horacker

=== John Rabe ===
- The Good Man of Nanking

=== Christoph Ransmayr ===
- Die Schrecken des Eises und der Finsternis: The Terrors of Ice and Darkness
- Die letzte Welt: The Last World
- Morbus Kitahara: The Dog King

=== Arno Schmidt ===
- Nobodaddys Kinder: Nobodaddy's Children
- Das steinerne Herz: The Stony Heart
- Die Gelehrtenrepulik: The Egghead Republic
- Kaff auch Mare Crisium: Boondocks/Moondocks
- Zettel's Traum: Bottom's Dream
- Die Schule der Atheisten: School for Atheists
- Abend mit Goldrand: Evening Edged in Gold (winner of the National Book Award and the PEN Prize for translation in 1981)

=== Ingo Schulze ===
- Simple Storys: Simple Stories
- 33 Augenblicke des Glücks: 33 Moments of Happiness
- Neue Leben: New Lives
- Handy: dreizehn Geschichten in alter Manier: One More Story: Thirteen Stories in the Time-Honored Mode
- Adam und Evelyn: Adam and Evelyn

=== Patrick Süskind ===
- Perfume (winner of the PEN Prize for translation in 1987)
- The Pigeon

=== Hans-Ulrich Treichel ===
- Leaving Sardinia

== Awards ==
For his edition of Schmidt's Evening Edged in Gold, Woods received the 1981 U.S. National Book Award in category Translation (a split award). He won the PEN Prize for translation twice, for that work and again for Perfume in 1987. Woods was also awarded the Helen and Kurt Wolff Translator's Prize for his translations of Thomas Mann's The Magic Mountain and Arno Schmidt's Nobodaddy's Children in 1996; as well as the Schlegel-Tieck Prize for the translation of Christoph Ransmayr's The Last World in 1991. He was awarded the Ungar German Translation Award in 1995, and later the prestigious Goethe-Medal from the Goethe Institute in 2008.
