= Valery Logvinov =

Soviet serial killer and rapist

- Born: Valery Zakharovich Logvinov; 1950; Saratov Oblast, RSFSR
- Died: 1977 (aged 26–27); SIZO-1, Saratov, Saratov Oblast, RSFSR
- Cause of death: Execution by shooting
- Other name: "The Hair Hunter"
- Convictions: Murder x6 Rape x7
- Penalty: Death

Details
- Victims: 6
- Span of crimes: 1974–1975
- Country: Soviet Union
- State: Saratov
- Date apprehended: 1975

Valery Zakharovich Logvinov (Russian: Валерий Захарович Логвинов; 1950 – 1977), known as The Hair Hunter (Russian: Охотник за волосами), was a Soviet serial killer and rapist who raped and murdered six women in Saratov and its suburbs from 1974 to 1975, all of whom had braided hair.

Logvinov would later be arrested, tried, convicted, and subsequently executed for the killings.

== Early life ==
Valery Logvinov was born in 1950 in the Saratov Oblast, where he spent his childhood and youth in poverty. His father, Zakhar, showed signs of a mental disorder and was aggressive towards his son and wife. According to Valery's later recollections, his mother used to have her hair braided when she was younger, which his father used to wrap around his arm during beatings to cause her more pain. This eventually led him to subconsciously associate women with braided hair with pain and being easily victimized.

In the late 1960s, Logvinov graduated from school and moved to Saratov, where he found a job as a tiler at a local factory. He was regarded positively by colleagues and was known to enjoy writing poetry, and by the early 1970s, he had acquired his own living space, had married, and had a child. Due to his handsome appearance and athletic figure, he was frequently courted by women.

Despite his success in life, Logvinov started to exhibit an increased sexual drive in mid-1974, which eventually spiralled into him committing rapes and murders.

== Murders ==
Logvinov's modus operandi consisted of attacking girls and women near vacant lots, hitting them on the head with a blunt object before dragging them to a dark, unlit area, where he would proceed to sexually assault and later kill them. Almost all of his attacks occurred in the Zavodskiy District.

The first murder linked to him occurred in early December 1974, with the victim being 92-year-old Valentina Tuchkova, an elderly woman with dementia who lived in a nursing home in Saratov. On the day of her death, Tuchkova had left the home in search of her mother when she was struck on the head by Logvinov and assaulted. She remained conscious for some time and was eventually brought to a hospital, but died from the injuries sustained in the attack. Since there were no witnesses present and Tuchkova herself was unable to explain what had happened, local police initially assumed that she had accidentally fallen and hit her head on the pavement.

On 15 December, Logvinov attacked 30-year-old Natalia Selyatina, whose skull he cracked with a strong blow from a steel pipe cutter, before undressing and sexually abusing her. Selyatina would later succumb to her injuries. A few days later, he did the same to 27-year-old Tatyana Larina, who was killed near the Selyatina crime scene.

A few days afterwards, Logvinov attacked a woman named Olga Igoshina, but while he was raping her, he realized he had been spotted by 25-year-old passer-by Svetlana Bukhanova, whereupon he immediately fled. Due to the injuries sustained in the attack, Igoshina suffered from anterograde amnesia and could not remember what had happened, but Bukhanova managed to give a description of the assailant, of whom the police developed an identikit.

At the end of December, Logvinov killed another woman, 47-year-old Raisa Dubova, who was raped and then succumbed to injuries sustained from blunt force trauma. One night in early 1975, Logvinov used a ladder to break into a first-floor apartment in the Zavodskiy District occupied by the Kuleshov family. Once he got inside, Logvinov attacked the sleeping spouses with a chair, causing both to lose consciousness. After raping the woman, Logvinov proceeded to search the cupboards and steal a number of items before fleeing the apartment. Kuleshova later succumbed to her injuries.

=== Manhunt, final attack and arrest ===
In order to catch the criminal, a regiment of special troops was brought to Saratov, in addition to female officers with braided hair being placed around the Zavodskiy District. However, Logvinov noticed the increased activity and decided to not commit another attack until mid-1975, this time in the Krasnokutsky District. The victim was 50-year-old Lyudmila Pavlikova, whom Logvinov struck with a steel pipe near a railroad station and then raped, but she managed to survive due to the fact that her ushanka had absorbed much of the impact from the pipe.

After Pavlikova was found, the employees at the railroad station called the police, who quickly cordoned off the area and arrested 12 men who matched the assailant's description. A few hours later, the investigators from the Zavodskiy District arrived at the scene and questioned the suspects, with one of them mentioning that he had an acquaintance named Valery Logvinov who was with him at the station but disappeared shortly after the attack on Pavlikova. The detainee explained that Logvinov was likely on his way to the village of Dyakovka, where his parents lived. On the same day, officers went to Dyakovka and arrested Logvinov at his parents' home.

== Investigation, trial and execution ==
After his arrest, Logvinov initially denied responsibility, after which detectives decided to organize a police lineup. Bukhanova was called in to identify the attacker and almost immediately pointed to Logvinov, even touching his chest with her finger. This interaction caused him to close his eyes and ask her to touch him some more, indicating that Logvinov felt sexual pleasure from this.

Soon afterwards, Logvinov admitted his guilt and began to actively cooperate with investigators. He told them that at the time of the attacks and murders, his wife was pregnant with their second child and did not want to have sex; because of this, he was unable to control his heightened sex drive and went searching for women. He also blamed his mental, emotional, and behavioural problems on his father and the abuse he had inflicted on him and his mother.

In order to gather further evidence against Logvinov, police contacted his mother-in-law, who was not on good terms with him. She stated that since he was known as a supposedly upstanding family man who returned to his family after work, the mother-in-law took notice that on several occasions between mid-1974 and mid-1975, Logvinov returned late without giving satisfying explanations why. She even recorded every single instance of this, which happened to coincide with the dates the rapes and murders had occurred.

However, investigators noticed 13 such dates were recorded, while they only knew of the five murders and four assaults. Because of this, they then turned towards the public, appealing for help and showing photographs of Logvinov on television. In the following days, five girls approached the Saratov police and claimed they had been assaulted by him in mid-1974, but their statements were ignored. In the following weeks, however, Logvinov admitted that he had indeed raped them, while he also admitted to two other crimes: the murder of a 17-year-old girl whose corpse he had thrown into a well, and the assault of a young woman who was on her way to the kindergarten to pick up her child. He recalled that the latter victim begged him to let her go, as she did not want her child to be orphaned, but he proceeded to sexually assault and beat her anyway. Miraculously, the victim survived.

In 1976, Logvinov was found guilty of the six murders and ten rapes, for which he was sentenced to death. He later filed an appeal, but it was promptly rejected, and he would later be executed on an unspecified date in 1977. Supposedly, Logvinov's last words consisted of his own poetry.

== See also ==
- List of Russian serial killers
- List of serial rapists

== In the media and culture ==
The Logvinov case was covered on the episode "Hair Hunter" (Russian: Охотник за волосами) from the documentary series The Investigation Was Conducted...(Russian: Следствие вели…). In the episode, his surname was changed from Logvinov to "Logachev".
