= The Last World =

1988 novel by Christoph Ransmayr

- First edition (German)
- Author: Christoph Ransmayr
- Original title: Die letzte Welt
- Translator: John E. Woods
- Language: German
- Publisher: Greno
- Publication date: 1988
- Publication place: Germany
- English publication date: 1990
- Pages: 319
- ISBN: 9783891903445

The Last World (German: Die letzte Welt) is a 1988 novel by the Austrian writer Christoph Ransmayr. Set in an inconsistent time period, it tells the story of a man, Cotta, who travels to Tomi to search for the poet Naso, who had settled there in political exile, after hearing rumours that Naso has died. In the town, Cotta encounters a number of characters from Ovid's Metamorphoses. The Last World was published in English in 1990, translated by John E. Woods.

== Reception ==
Kirkus Reviews called the book an "ambitious, stylish historical work". Robert Irwin wrote in The New York Times: "This remarkable second novel by Christoph Ransmayr, a young Austrian novelist, carries the conviction of an ominous dream". Irwin first compared it to the works of surrealist painters, after which he wrote: "But the shape-shifting world in which Cotta conducts his quest owes more to Latin literature than to Surrealist theory. ... The Last World, with its careful anachronisms and deformations, is a brilliant exercise in alternative literary history."

Richard Eder of the Los Angeles Times described the book as a "powerful allegory of rise, fall and change", and wrote:

There is nothing Olympian or didactic about Ransmayr's parable. It is told at extremes, in harsh images and bleak ellipses. It is strung along mysteries—Where is Ovid? Who are the townspeople whom Cotta encounters in Tomi?—and its tone is grotesque and frozen by turns.

Eder saw a flaw in how the townspeople of Tomi, unlike the characters in Metamorphoses, fail to become touching to the reader, which makes the story "wooden". Eder wrote: "As a parable, nonetheless, it has a vivid and unsettling force."

The English translation was awarded the 1991 Schlegel-Tieck Prize from the Society of Authors.
