= The Terrors of Ice and Darkness =

1984 novel by Christoph Ransmayr

- First edition (German)
- Author: Christoph Ransmayr
- Original title: Die Schrecken des Eises und der Finsternis
- Translator: John E. Woods
- Language: German
- Publisher: Brandstätter
- Publication date: 1984
- Publication place: Germany
- English publication date: 1991
- Pages: 256
- ISBN: 9783854470434

The Terrors of Ice and Darkness (German: Die Schrecken des Eises und der Finsternis) is a 1984 novel by the Austrian writer Christoph Ransmayr. It tells the stories of the 1872–74 Austro-Hungarian North Pole expedition, of a young Italian man who disappeared in 1981 while researching the expedition, and of the narrator, who tries to figure out what happened to the Italian.

== Publication ==
The book was published in Germany in 1984. An English translation by John E. Woods was published in 1991 through Grove Press.

== Reception ==
Publishers Weekly wrote: "This aggressively intelligent narrative transforms the polar regions into unusually fertile ground." Geoffrey Moorhouse wrote in The New York Times: "Were it not for the invented character of Mazzini there would be no justification for categorizing Mr. Ransmayr's book as a novel at all. ... As a result, this is to some extent a book of information about difficult travel in one of the bleakest places on earth." The critic wrote that the book also is "about a number of psychological factors inseparable from quests", and "most important of all, the novelist strips away the spurious glamour that usually attaches itself to the idea of hard traveling."

== Adaptation ==
Theater Paderborn produced a play based on the novel in 2015.
