= Christoph Ransmayr =

Austrian writer (born 1954)

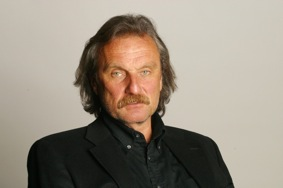
Christoph Ransmayr (photo by Johannes Cizek)

Christoph Ransmayr (Austrian German: [ˈkrɪstɔf ˈransmaɪɐ]; born 20 March 1954) is an Austrian writer.

== Life ==
Born in Wels, Upper Austria, Ransmayr grew up in Roitham near Gmunden and the Traunsee. From 1972 to 1978 he studied philosophy and ethnology in Vienna. He worked there as cultural editor for the newspaper Extrablatt from 1978 to 1982, also publishing articles and essays in GEO, TransAtlantik and Merian. After his novel Die letzte Welt was published in 1988, he traveled extensively across Ireland, Asia, North and South America. This is reflected in his works, where he looks at life as a tourist and believes that good writing needs ignorance, speechlessness, light luggage, curiosity, or at least a willingness not only to judge the world, but to experience it. In 1994 he moved to West Cork, Ireland, as a friend offered to lease him a splendid house on the Atlantic coast for a very affordable rent.

In his prose, Ransmayr combines historical facts with fiction. His novels portray cross-border experiences and weave historical events with the present time. The combination of exciting plots and demanding forms in his first two novels brought him praise, attention from literary studies, and numerous literary prizes.

Ransmayr achieved international success with his novel The Last World (1988), a rewrite of Ovid’s Metamorphoses. His novel Morbus Kitahara (1995) is named after an eye disease which leads to an increasing narrowing of the field of vision. It is a metaphor for the moral defect afflicting the main characters, survivors of World War II, in a devastated no man's land.

In 1997, Ransmayr read his short story Die dritte Luft oder Eine Bühne am Meer, written for this occasion, as a keynote speech for the Salzburg Festival. After his marriage in the Spring of 2006 Ransmayr returned to live in Vienna. His play Odysseus, Verbrecher was performed in Dortmund as part of the RUHR.2010 events.

In 2018, he received the Nicolas Born Prize for his literary works to date.

== Awards ==
- 1986–1988 Elias Canetti Fellowship, see also Elias Canetti
- 1988 Anton Wildgans Prize
- 1992 Großer Literaturpreis der Bayerischen Akademie der Schönen Künste
- 1995 Franz-Kafka-Preis, see also Franz Kafka
- 1995 Franz Nabl Prize
- 1996 Aristeion Prize for the novel Morbus Kitahara
- 1997 Solothurner Literaturpreis
- 1997 Kulturpreis des Landes Oberösterreich
- 1998 Friedrich-Hölderlin-Preis
- 2001 Nestroy Theatre Prize, see also Johann Nestroy
- 2004 Bertolt-Brecht-Literaturpreis
- 2004 Großer Österreichischer Staatspreis für Literatur
- 2010 28° Preis Gambrinus "Giuseppe Mazzotti"
- 2013 Donauland Sachbuchpreis
- 2013 Ernst-Toller-Preis
- 2013 Brothers Grimm Prize of the City of Hanau for Atlas of an Anxious Man
- 2014 Fontane Prize of the City of Neuruppin for Atlas of an Anxious Man
- 2015 Prix Jean Monnet de Littérature Européenne for Atlas of an Anxious Man
- 2015 Prix du Meilleur livre étranger for Atlas of an Anxious Man
- 2018 Nicolas Born Prize for his literary works to date
- 2018 Kleist Prize

== Bibliography ==
- Strahlender Untergang, together with Willy Puchner, 1982, ISBN 3-85447-006-1
- Die Schrecken des Eises und der Finsternis, 1984, ISBN 3-85447-043-6
- Die letzte Welt, 1988, ISBN 3-89190-244-1
- Morbus Kitahara, 1995, ISBN 3-10-062908-6
- Der Weg nach Surabaya, 1997, ISBN 3-10-062916-7
- Die dritte Luft, oder Eine Bühne am Meer, 1997, ISBN 3-10-062920-5
- Die Unsichtbare. Tirade an drei Stränden, 2001, ISBN 3-10-062924-8
- Der Ungeborene, oder Die Himmelsareale des Anselm Kiefer, 2002, ISBN 3-10-062925-6
- Die Verbeugung des Riesen. Vom Erzählen, 2003, ISBN 3-10-062926-4
- Geständnisse eines Touristen. Ein Verhör, 2004, ISBN 3-10-062927-2
- Der fliegende Berg, 2006, ISBN 978-3-10-062936-4
- Damen & Herren unter Wasser, together with Manfred Wakolbinger, 2007, ISBN 978-3-10-062937-1
- Odysseus, Verbrecher. Schauspiel einer Heimkehr, 2010, ISBN 978-3-10-062945-6
- Der Wolfsjäger. Drei polnische Duette, together with Martin Pollack, 2011, ISBN 978-3-10-062950-0
- Atlas eines ängstlichen Mannes, 2012, ISBN 978-3-10-062951-7
- Gerede: Elf Ansprachen, 2014, ISBN 978-3-10-062952-4
- Cox oder Der Lauf der Zeit, 2016, ISBN 978-3-10-082951-1
- Der Fallmeister. Eine kurze Geschichte vom Töten, 2021, ISBN 978-3-10-002288-2
- Egal wohin, Baby. Mikroromane, 2024, ISBN 978-3-10-397661-8

=== English editions ===
- The Terrors of Ice and Darkness, 1991, translated by John E. Woods, ISBN 0-8021-3459-9
- The Last World, 1991, translated by John E. Woods, ISBN 0-8021-3458-0
- The Dog King, 1997, translated by John E. Woods, ISBN 0-679-76860-2
- Atlas of an Anxious Man, 2016, translated by Simon Pare, ISBN 978-0-85742-314-6
- The Flying Mountain, 2018, translated by Simon Pare, ISBN 978-0-85742-506-5
- Cox, or, The Course of Time, 2020, translated by Simon Pare, ISBN 978-0-85742-736-6
- The Lockmaster: A Short Story of a Killing, 2024, translated by Simon Pare, ISBN 978-1-80309-370-3

== See also ==
- List of Austrian writers
