= Ruhr.2010 =

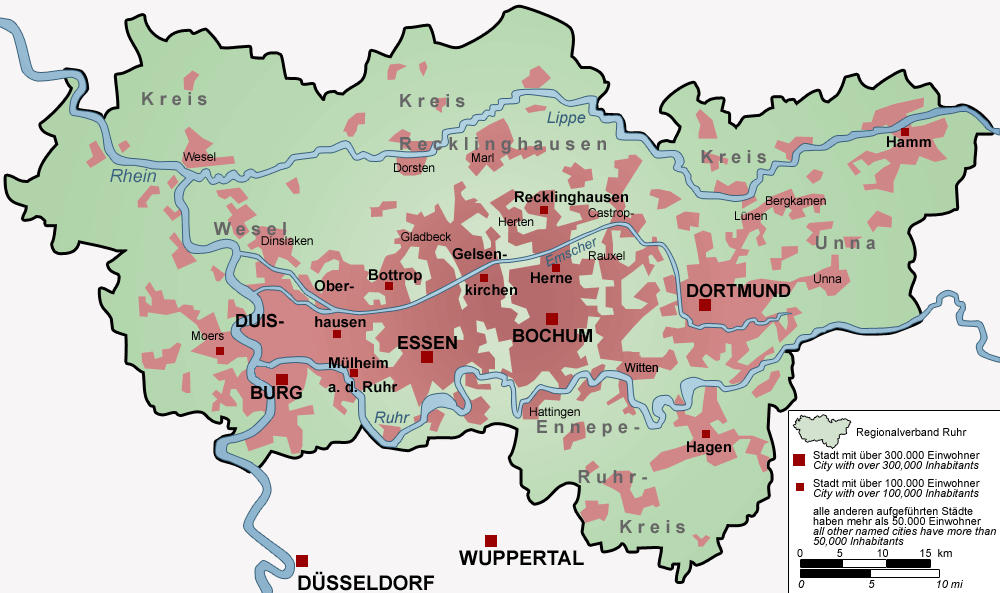
Ruhr region

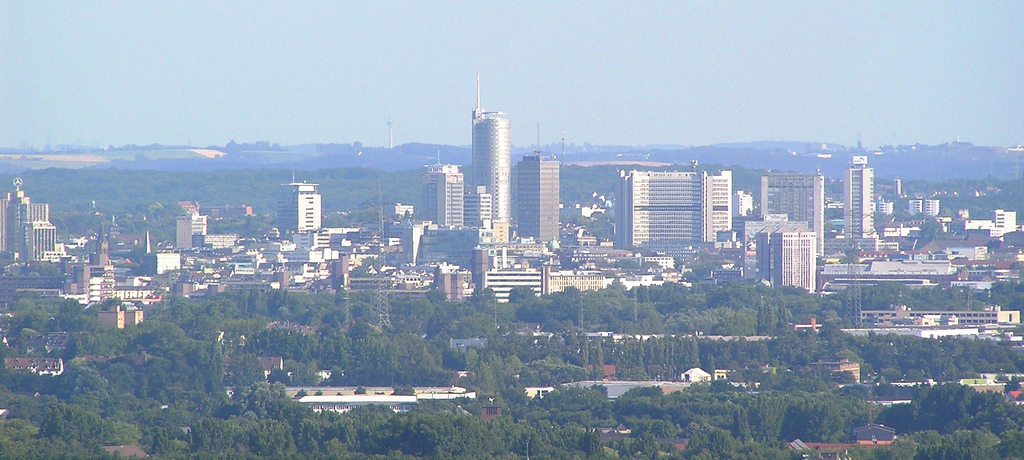
Essen representing the Ruhr as Ruhr.2010

Ruhr.2010 – Kulturhauptstadt Europas was the name of the campaign in Germany's Ruhr region that earned it recognition as a European Capital of Culture in 2010. This was the first time a region was considered, as Essen represented all 53 towns in the region in the application. Other cultural capitals were in the same year the Hungarian Pécs (Pécs2010) and Istanbul in Turkey, where similar campaigns were held.

== Participating cities ==
The Ruhr.2010 campaign included the participation of all cities in the Ruhr area. Apart from Essen, which presented itself all year long, each of the other cities had one week to themselves in 2010, in which they became the reigning "Local Hero". The participating towns and cities were:

Alpen, Bergkamen, Bochum, Bönen, Bottrop, Breckerfeld, Castrop-Rauxel, Datteln, Dinslaken, Dorsten, Dortmund, Duisburg, Ennepetal, Erkenschwick, Essen, Fröndenberg, Gelsenkirchen, Gevelsberg, Gladbeck, Hagen, Haltern am See, Hamm, Hattingen, Heiligenhaus, Herdecke, Herne, Herten, Holzwickede, Hünxe, Kamen, Kamp-Lintfort, Lünen, Marl, Moers, Mülheim an der Ruhr, Neukirchen-Vluyn, Oberhausen, Recklinghausen, Rheinberg, Schermbeck, Schwelm, Schwerte, Selm, Sonsbeck, Sprockhövel, Unna, Voerde, Waltrop, Werne, Wesel, Wetter, Witten, Xanten

== Team ==
The campaign team consisted of well-known personalities in the arts and political world:

- Administrative directors of the Ruhr.2010 GmbH:
  - Fritz Pleitgen: First administrative director
  - Oliver Scheytt: Administrative director
- Artistic directors:
  - Karl-Heinz Petzinka: director for the theme "City of possibilities"
  - Steven Sloane: director of "City of the Arts"
  - Aslı Sevindim: director of "City of Cultures"
  - Dieter Gorny: director of "City of Creativity"

== Literature ==
- Wolfgang Sykorra: Borbecker Halblang. Ein Schulprojekt der Kulturhauptstadt Europas Ruhr.2010. Essen: Edition Rainruhr 2011. ISBN 978-3-941676-07-7
- RUHR.2010 GmbH (Hrsg.): Kulturhauptstadt Europas RUHR.2010: Buch zwei. Klartext Verlag, 2010, ISBN 978-3-8375-0316-6
- Achim Nöllenheidt: RuhrKompakt: Der Kulturhauptstadt-Erlebnisführer. Klartext Verlag, 2009, ISBN 978-3-8375-0251-0
- Gudrun Norbisrath, Achim Nöllenheidt: Kultur an der Ruhr. Entdeckungsreise in die Kulturhauptstadt. Klartext, Essen 2010, ISBN 978-3-8375-0266-4
- Regionalverband Ruhr (Hrsg.): Unter freiem Himmel / Under the Open Sky. Birkhäuser Verlag, 2010, ISBN 978-3-0346-0266-2
- Regionalverband Ruhr (Hrsg.): Feldstudien/ Field studies. Birkhäuser Verlag, 2010, ISBN 978-3-0346-0260-0
- Gregor Gumpert, Ewald Tucai (Hrsg.): Ruhr.Buch: das Ruhrgebiet literarisch. Dt. Taschenbuch-Verl., 2009, ISBN 978-3-423-13826-0
