= Orphans of the Helix =

Short story by Dan Simmons

- Short story by Dan Simmons
- Country: United States
- Language: English
- Genre: Science fiction

Publication
- Published in: Far Horizons
- Publication type: Anthology
- Publication date: 1999
- Series: Hyperion Cantos

"Orphans of the Helix" is a 46-page science fiction short story by American writer Dan Simmons, set in his Hyperion Cantos fictional universe (one of three, the others being "Remembering Siri", a story which is also a chapter of Hyperion, and "The Death of a Centaur", which deals with an early and allegorical version of either The Fall of Hyperion or Endymion). It was first published in the anthology Far Horizons in 1999.

"Orphans of the Helix" won the 2000 Locus Award for best novella.

== Setting ==
It is set more than 481 years after The Rise of Endymion; the Pax is long since defeated, and the Aenean movement has been helping various groups colonize unknown space. One of the groups is the "Amoiete Spectrum Helix", which after their persecution by the Pax has been reconstituted. Approximately 600,000 opt to colonize some star system centuries of travel core-wards beyond former Pax space using a spinship built by the Aeneans, who give them special permission to use the Hawking drive, despite its deleterious effects on the Void Which Binds (after redesigning it to reduce the effect by orders of magnitude).

== Plot summary ==
The spinship Helix has not yet reached a suitable destination when it receives a distress signal from a binary star system. Four of the five shipboard AI (apparently formerly of the TechnoCore; in characteristic Simmons fashion, each is patterned after a famous literary figure, in this case, Japanese: Saigyo, Lady Murasaki, Ikkyu, Basho, and Ryōkan) decide that the call is worth investigating, not least because of the further anomaly that the orbital forest around the lesser of the two stars, which the AIs intend to resupply their ship from, is of neither Ouster nor Templar construction, though they may have settled on it.

The AIs awaken certain crewmembers, and together they enter the system, where they are greeted by hundreds of thousands of space-adapted Ousters; they importune the Helix to save their civilization from an enormous and ancient harvester spaceship (which gathers food, air, and water), which visits every 57 years, and is so programmatically inflexible that it sees the Ouster and Templar settlements as infestations of the tree-ring, and attempts to cleanse it by eradicating them. Over the centuries, the colony's technological infrastructure has been steadily ground under by its assaults, and many die attacking or being attacked.

A brief assay of the harvester's defenses (for the 57 years have elapsed since the last visit, and the harvester has arrived) by one of the Helix's armed vessels reveal the ancient device to be minimally defended and weakened by age; easily destroyed. However, the harvester is presumably being used by its creators, and destroying it might be tantamount to condemning that civilization to slow starvation and death. Even despite its misdeeds, the crew of the Helix cannot countenance that possibility, though they saw no inhabitants in the other, red-giant system.

Since they cannot get to the system normally before the harvester strikes again, the crew votes to risk the Helix and its hundreds of thousands of stored inhabitants by making a very short Hawking drive jump. The jump succeeds, and they begin scanning the system for life. On an inspiration, they scan inside the red giant star, and discover a truly ancient rocky world which the star had enveloped in its expansion. It is honey-combed, and occupied by a curious oxygen-breathing race, whose primary method of technological communication is via modulated gravity waves (explaining the failure of previous attempts to contact the harvester). Aboard is Ces Ambre, the only survivor of the family which took in Raul Endymion; though she is not an Aenean, she received the Aenean nano-technology; she cannot freecast, but she is capable of empathetic communication with the more than 3 billion "modular... so fibrous" minds in the cinder planet. She successfully explains the harm their harvester has caused. They are devastated to learn of what they had done, and immediately transmit a gravitonic sequence which would reprogram the harvester (they offer further to commit collective suicide to atone for their crimes, but the Spectrum feels that this is not needed), as indeed it does. They also reveal the reason they stubbornly stay in their original planet and constructed the harvester and tree-ring: they like their home, and don't want to leave.

Ces Ambre offers a vial of her blood to the tree-ring inhabitants; though she is not philosophically an Aenean and refrains from using her abilities, she feels that the natives should have the choice.

The crew return to hibernation, and the AI direct the Helix on its way under Hawking drive. Mysteriously, the Shrike, Dem Loa (Ces Ambre's mother), and "Petyr, son of Aenea and Endymion" appear on the bridge. Petyr briefly communes directly with the AIs, healing Basho's psychological conflicts, and directing them to divert the Helix to a nice, but challenging system. He and Dem Loa then vanish, apparently using the Shrike as a method of locomotion.
