= Endymion =

Endymion primarily refers to:

- Endymion (mythology), an Ancient Greek shepherd
- Endymion (poem), by John Keats

Endymion may also refer to:

== Fictional characters ==
- Prince Endymion, a character in the Sailor Moon anime franchise
- Raul Endymion, a character in the Hyperion Cantos series of science fiction novels
- Endymion, a deity for Dark Elves in Dungeons & Dragons; see Elf (Dungeons & Dragons)
- "Endymion, the Master Magician", a card in the Yu-Gi-Oh! Trading Card Game and a character in Yu-Gi-Oh! 5D's World Championship 2009: Stardust Accelerator.

== People ==
- Endymion Porter, an English diplomat and royalist
- Endymion Wilkinson, a diplomat, Sinologist and historian
- Endymion Smythe, 3rd Viscount Strangford
- Krewe of Endymion, a New Orleans Mardi Gras krewe

== Titled works ==
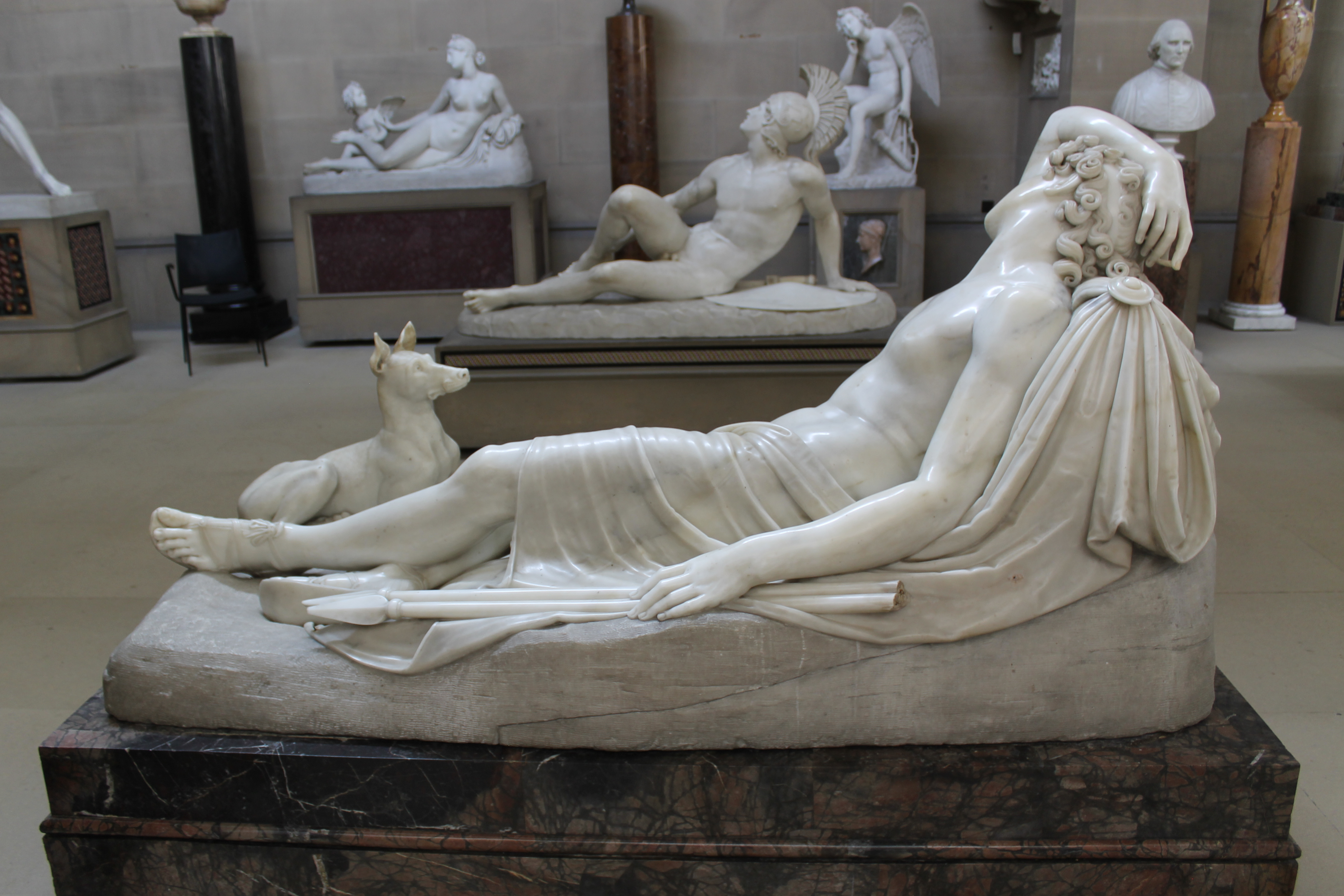
Marble representation of Endymion by Antonio Canova in Chatsworth House

- "Endymion", a poem by Henry Wadsworth Longfellow
- "Endymion", a poem by Oscar Wilde
- Endymion, a painting by George Frederic Watts
- Endymion (Disraeli novel), an 1880 novel by Benjamin Disraeli, 1st Earl of Beaconsfield
- Endymion (Simmons novel), a 1996 science fiction novel
  - The Rise of Endymion, a sequel to the above novel
- Endymion (play), by John Lyly
- Endymion, a sculpture by Antonio Canova
- A Certain Magical Index: The Movie – The Miracle of Endymion, a 2013 Japanese animated film

== Science and technology ==
- 342 Endymion, an asteroid
- Endymion, in botany a synonym of the bluebell genus Hyacinthoides
- Turanana endymion, the binomial Latin name for the odd-spot blue butterfly
- Endymion (crater), on the Moon
- HMS Endymion, any of four British warships
- USS Endymion (ARL-9)
- Endymion (yacht)
- Endymion, an Armstrong Whitworth Ensign aircraft

== Music ==
- Endymion (band), a Dutch Hardcore trio (on Netherlands Wikipedia)
- Endymion (ensemble), an English chamber music group

== See also ==
- Endy Sleep, a Canadian direct online-only mattress retailer named after the mythological figure
- Endymion Penhaligon's parfum produced since 2003
