= Far Horizons =

Science fiction anthology edited by Robert Silverberg

Far Horizons: All New Tales from the Greatest Worlds of Science Fiction
- Cover of first edition
- Editor: Robert Silverberg
- Translator: None
- Cover artist: Amy Halperin
- Language: English
- Genre: Science fiction
- Publisher: Avon Books, Avon Eos imprint
- Publication date: May 1999
- Publication place: United States
- Media type: Print
- Pages: 482
- ISBN: 0-380-97630-7 (1st edition, 1st printing)
- OCLC: 40180250
- Dewey Decimal: 813/.0876208 21
- LC Class: PS648.S3 F37 1999

Far Horizons: All New Tales from the Greatest Worlds of Science Fiction is an anthology of original science fiction stories edited by Robert Silverberg, first published in hardcover by Avon Eos in May 1999, with a book club edition following from Avon and the Science Fiction Book Club in July of the same year. Paperback and trade paperback editions were issued by Eos/HarperCollins in May 2000 and December 2005, respectively, and an ebook edition by HarperCollins e-books in March 2009. The first British edition was issued in hardcover and trade paperback by Orbit/Little Brown in June 1999, with a paperback edition following from Orbit in July 2000.

The book has also been translated into Dutch, French, Polish and Spanish.

== Summary ==
The anthology contains eleven short works by various science fiction authors, including one by the editor himself, together with an introduction explaining the project by the editor and an introduction and occasionally an afterword to each story by its author. Each story was original to the anthology and set in one of the principal fictional universes of each author (the exact ones are noted in the Contents section below). Silverberg was also the editor of the Legends anthologies, which similarly contain new short works by fantasy authors set in those authors' fantasy universes. Four authors (Card, Le Guin, McCaffrey, and Silverberg) had stories included in both collections.

== Contents ==
- Introduction, by Robert Silverberg
- "Old Music and the Slave Women", Ursula K. Le Guin (Ekumen)
- "A Separate War", by Joe Haldeman (The Forever War series)
- "Investment Counselor", Orson Scott Card (Ender's Game series)
- "Temptation", David Brin (Uplift Universe)
- "Getting to Know the Dragon", Robert Silverberg (Roma Eterna)
- "Orphans of the Helix", Dan Simmons (Hyperion Cantos)
- "Sleeping Dogs", Nancy Kress (The Sleepless)
- "The Boy Who Would Live Forever", Frederik Pohl (Tales of the Heechee)
- "A Hunger for the Infinite", Gregory Benford (the Galactic Center series)
- "The Ship That Returned", Anne McCaffrey (The Ship Who Sang)
- "The Way of All Ghosts", Greg Bear (The Way)

== Awards ==
Far Horizons won the 2000 Locus Award for Best Anthology.

== Reception ==
Reviews were positive, generally noting the anthology's status as a science fiction equivalent to the editor's previous fantasy anthology Legends, "collecting new tales by a number of the world's greatest SF writers set in the universes of their best-known series."

Kirkus Reviews calls the book "[a]n ideal combination of the reassuringly familiar and the excitingly new: should prove as popular as its fantasy predecessor."

Jeff Zaleski in Publishers Weekly assesses the book as "an important anthology that should appeal to all serious readers of SF." He notes that "[s]ome entries ... stand more or less independent of what has preceded them. Others ... are essentially engaging footnotes, filling in worthwhile bits of information that never made it into previous novels. Still others... continue an author's ongoing stories beyond the reach of the major works. ... All the stories are, at a minimum, very good, and several are outstanding. The Le Guin and Simmons contributions are particularly worthy of award consideration."

Sally Estes in The Booklist notes that the authors "each explor[e] some aspect of theirs that they did not find a way of dealing with in the books of the series proper. ... And, once again, the stories remain true to their universes and characters, so they deliver good first-contact experiences for series novices as well as happy reading for longtime fans." The book is rated a "must" for young adult science fiction collections.

Jackie Cassada in Library Journal writes "this collection of novellas ... serves as a sampler of the best of the genre. Highly recommended for series fans and newcomers alike and a good choice for most sf collections."
