= Prayers to Broken Stones =

Short story collection by Dan Simmons

- First edition
- Author: Dan Simmons
- Cover artist: Ron Lindahn and Val Lakey Lindahn
- Language: English
- Series: Multiple
- Genre: Science fiction, Horror, Adventure
- Publisher: Dark Harvest; Bantam Books (Bantam Spectra imprint)
- Publication date: 1990 (Dark Harvest). May 1992 (Bantam).
- Publication place: United States
- Media type: Print (hardback & paperback)
- Pages: 403 pages
- ISBN: 0-913165-58-1 (Dark Harvest)
- OCLC: 22905535

Prayers to Broken Stones is a short story collection by American author Dan Simmons. It includes 13 of his earlier works, along with an introduction by Harlan Ellison in which the latter relates how he "discovered" Dan Simmons at the Colorado Mountain College's "Writers' Conference in the Rockies" in 1981. The title is a borrowed line from T. S. Eliot's "The Hollow Men".

== Contents ==
=== "The River Styx Runs Upstream" ===
==== History ====
"The River Styx Runs Upstream" was Dan Simmons's first published work, and the short story that brought him to Ellison's attention in August 1979. Simmons relates the tale in his introduction, noting that Ellison's initial reaction was this (possibly a little tongue in cheek):

"Who is this Simmons?" bellowed Ellison. "Stand up, wave your hand, show yourself, goddamnit. What egomaniacal monstrosity has the fucking gall, the unmitigated hubris to inflict a story of five thousand fucking words on this workshop? Show yourself, Simmons!"

Simmons survived Ellison's critique, and Ellison pushed Simmons into submitting it to Twilight Zone Magazine "for their first annual contest for unpublished writers" (page 16, introduction to "The River Styx Runs Upstream"). Out of around 7000 submissions, it tied for first place and was published 15 February 1982 (according to PtBS's copyright page, in April, not February).

==== Plot summary ====
The actual story is classic Simmons in its literary allusions, with epigraphs from Ezra Pound's Cantos; the protagonist's father is a Pound scholar with an especial interest in the Cantos (reading from it to his children), and the premise can be seen as deriving from a line in the Cantos as well.

The mother of the family has died of some unspecified illness. Stricken by grief, the father bargains (heedless of the prospect of financial ruin) with the "Resurrectionists" to have his wife's corpse technologically revived. The resurrection is a hollow one, as all higher cognitive functions are irreparably damaged, although it does function somewhat autonomously. Their family is stigmatized, and the father slowly breaks down and his classes become less and less popular until he takes a sabbatical to write his long-planned work on the Cantos. He spends most of it drunk. Simon, the protagonist's brother, eventually commits suicide. A few years later, while the protagonist is at university (sponsored by the Resurrectionists, whom he has joined) the father commits suicide as well. He graduates and begins working for them and helping to spread the living dead. He does little but work, spending his free time with his resurrected family.

=== "Eyes I Dare Not Meet in Dreams" ===
==== History ====
"Eyes I Dare Not Meet in Dreams" was first published in OMNI Magazine in September 1987. It was inspired by his 1969 experiences in Germantown, Pennsylvania, when he worked with children with physical and mental disabilities, as a teacher's aide in the Upsal Day School for the Blind. The story forms the seed, the original form, of Simmons's later novel, The Hollow Man.

==== Plot summary ====
The two central characters are the Americans Bremen and Gail. Both are telepaths, the only other telepaths that either has ever known. Inevitably, they fall in love. When Gail dies of illness, Bremen is devastated. He gives up his career in mathematics and becomes a drifter. At the commencement of the action, he has ended up at a facility for disabled minors. He becomes sort of fond of one named Robby, who had been blinded and mentally crippled before birth by his mother's drug abuse habits, and resolves that before he leaves the facility (for he feels he has been there too long), he will use his telepathic power to give Robby a gift of sorts: images and sounds of the outside world.

Bremen succeeds in penetrating Robby's mental defenses, but is unexpectedly sucked into Robby's mind, where Gail manifests. The fusion between Gail and Bremen was deep and profound enough. Unfortunately, the strain of holding Bremen and Gail in his mind and in comprehending what the show up pushes Robby's obese body to the brink and over. Bremen leaves Robby's mind, taking Gail and Robby with him while Robby's body dies.

=== "Vanni Fucci is Alive and Well and Living in Hell" ===
This story, and the following one, are both darkly humorous and deal with televangelists. It was first published in Dark Harvest's "Night Visions 5" in 1988.

The events concern a day when a major and unscrupulous televangelist (Brother Freddy) sees a scheduled appearance by Dale Evans go seriously wrong when an exotic Italian-looking fellow strolls on stage. He announces that he is Vanni Fucci (a character from Dante Alighieri's Divine Comedy) and that "for the last seven hundred years I have lived in hell." (pg 72) Each Bolgia of Dante's Hell is allowed to send one of its inhabitants (Fucci was of the Seventh Bolgia of the Eighth Circle of Hell) back to Earth for a brief period of time, and Fucci happened to be chosen. Unlike most such returnees, he is not indulging in as many worldly pleasures as he can, however, but has returned in order to remedy a distressing problem. He recounts that Hell and even gods are created and uncreated by the strength of people's beliefs, and unfortunately Fucci was condemned to eternal suffering simply because he had gotten politically cross-wise of Dante and Dante's Hell was the most popular version (and so, the real one).

By this point, it is clear that a supernatural force is at work: Security is being prevented from getting onto the stage by an invisible and extremely resilient wall, and the cameras are physically disassembled but are still transmitting over the air.

From Fucci's perspective, the torments of Hell are quite bad enough, but the colossal and cosmic injustice of being condemned to Hell for his politics aggravates him sufficiently that he "gives God the fig"; to punish Fucci for his blasphemy, every thief "within a hundred yards" becomes "Chelidrids, jaculi, phareans, cenchriads" and "two-headed amphisbands" (pg 80), who then attack him and rend him limb from limb in a painful orgy of violence. This punishment of course aggravates Fucci even more.

Hell's management also adds big-screen TVs which broadcast "Brother Freddy's Hallelujah Breakfast Club" eight times a day. When the topic is brought up on-stage, it aggravates Fucci so much that he gives God the fig twice. When he does so, most of the audience (including Brother Freddy and most of his staff) transform into the named monsters and attack Fucci. The entire ball of beasts then disappears in hellfire and brimstone.

=== "Vexed to Nightmare by a Rocking Cradle" ===
==== History ====
"Vexed to Nightmare by a Rocking Cradle" (besides being an allusion to William Butler Yeats's "The Second Coming") is a short story which deals with televangelism after an apocalypse. Simmons mentions in the introduction that he was commissioned to write a Christmas tale that included an "overlooked present", but that he was given free rein otherwise: one of the authors was assigned the upbeat and happy story, so the other three could be as unrelievedly grim and dark as amused them. Amusingly, the happy tale was never actually submitted, so the collection was dark indeed. It didn't help that the next Christmas they were republished in Asimov's SF Magazine "where it served to dark the next Christmas for a host of people." (p. 86). As Simmons goes on to relate, "It wasn't long before I had the reputation as The Man Who Sacrificed Christmas with a Survival Knife." It was first published in Mile High Futures in November 1985.

==== Plot summary ====
It is set in a flooded post-apocalyptic New York City, to which televangelists have dispatched missionaries equipped with Satellite TV reception units to convert the heathens. Brother Jimmy-Joe Billy-Bob has been sent to NYC. There he meets the Red Bantam clan, which tattoos images of bantams on its members (as Simmons notes, this is a sly reference to the publisher Bantam Books), which Jimmy-Joe interprets as the Mark of the Beast. Prompted by the Holy Spirit, Jimmy-Joe takes a survival knife that appeared as an extra present as a gift. He tells the children that "Anyone upon the roof tonight would see [the pagan and hence evil, from his perspective] Santa Claus and his reindeer." When one comes up the flights seeking him, Billy-Bob sacrifices her on the altar holding up the antenna with the survival knife.

=== "Remembering Siri" ===
"Remembering Siri" is a science-fiction short story; it is the first work Simmons wrote down (the original of "Death of the Centaur" presumably is the absolute first story ever told of the Cantos) in his Hyperion Cantos fictional universe, published in Asimov's SF Magazine in December 1983. Simmons used it as the seed for Hyperion (in which it appears nearly verbatim as the chapter titled "The Consul's Tale") and The Fall of Hyperion. Simmons's inspiration was the proposition, "What if Romeo and Juliet had lived?" (pg 100) For a plot summary, see "The Consul's Tale".

=== "Metastasis" ===
"Metastasis" is a horror short story published in Dark Harvest's 1988 anthology Night Visions 5.

It deals with Louis Steig, whose mother is dying of cancer. He rushes to her side, but his car crashes on some black ice. He suffers some damage to his vision and brain. While visiting his mother, he discovers a creature no one else can see, which he calls "cancer vampires", infesting his mother with "tumor-slugs". At her funeral, many of these vampires visit to feed on the now corpulent and grown slugs infesting her body. Eventually after both his sister and his fiancée contract cancer, Louis discovers that he can kill cancer vampires by taking radioactive isotopes into his body; these isotopes act as a beacon to the slugs, who are poisoned when they flock to it. In turn, these slugs poison the vampires who eat them when the vampires themselves flock to Louis.

=== "The Offering" ===
"The Offering" is a teleplay adaptation of "Metastasis", which appeared on the TV show Monsters in 1990. It is largely faithful, but simpler version of the story.

=== E-Ticket to 'Namland ===
"E-Ticket to 'Namland" was first published in OMNI Magazine in November 1987. It concerns a Vietnam War veteran who returns to Vietnam and after visiting a theme park recreating the war, goes berserk and escapes into the jungle with his grandchildren, killing his pursuers with a weapon he stole from a South Vietnamese who had returned to take revenge of the Korean government for betraying all that he and his comrades had fought for.

=== "Iverson's Pits" ===
"Iverson's Pits" is another horror short story, published in 1988 in Night Visions 5 by Dark Harvest.

It recounts the fate of a young Boy Scout during the fiftieth anniversary of the Battle of Gettysburg. There he is randomly assigned to assist a veteran, one Captain Montgomery from North Carolina. The captain brandishes an antique pistol at the unnamed scout, and orders a wagon and team. Fortuitously, just such a team shows up, and the captain heads out to "Iverson's Pits", where he expects to reach a consummation to his long-held obsession with achieving a revenge on his former commander, Alfred Iverson. Apparently, Iverson's incompetence had led him to order his men into the teeth of a Union trap while he had lunch. To cover his own failing, Iverson claimed to one and all that his men were cowards and had tried to surrender.

The two hide in some weeds and ambush a young man who looks much like Iverson did. The boy stops the Captain from killing him, as the traveler is far too young. They cordially greet the traveler, whose name is Sheads, and visit his house. Jessup Sheads toasts the captain's regiment, and then Iverson himself with some of the local wine. The Captain refuses the second toast, cursing Iverson. Sheads reveals himself to be Iverson's nephew. Iverson comes down, and the nephew kills Montgomery when he draws a revolver on Iverson. About to bury the Captain, Iverson orders Sheads to kill the scout as well, to silence all witnesses, when the very earth begins moving and opening up. With its teeth, it seizes and devours Sheads. Iverson attempts to escape on his horse and kill the Scout, but he hurls a lantern at Iverson, distracting him. The pits take Iverson and his horse, and the Scout eventually becomes a historian specializing in Gettysburg.

=== "Shave and a Haircut, Two Bites" ===
"Shave and a Haircut" is a horror short story. It was published in Masques III (edited by J. N. Williamson) in 1989.

Two boys, Kevin and Tommy, have become convinced (mostly Kevin) that the two barbers who run the unpopular and obscure old barbershop in town are actually vampires. Despite failing most vampire tests (such as disliking garlic, crossing running water, crosses etc.) the two break into the barbershop's basement. They are captured and the truth revealed: neither barber is a vampire. Rather, they harvest blood for their resident vampire; vampires have changed over the centuries into gigantic things more akin to 1000-pound leeches than anything that could pass for a human. They bargained with the barber guild: if the guild would hide and feed them, then the barbers would be allowed to harvest a sort of purified blood which grants partial immortality to humans. The two are forcibly inducted into this grim fraternity.

=== "The Death of the Centaur" ===
==== History ====
"The Death of the Centaur" is a short story original to Prayers to Broken Stones. The frame story concerns the friendship between a literary-inclined teacher (based on Simmons himself) and a poor boy named Terry, whom he teaches. The teacher begins telling his class every recess a portion of a fantasy story ("The Story"). This fantasy story is the tale of a centaur named Raul (compare Raul Endymion of Endymion), a neo-cat, and a sorcerer-ape who seek to reconnect their world to the "Web of Worlds" by re-connecting a farcaster and seek the humans' help in overthrowing the lizard-ish Wizards who oppress their world. This story is the earliest and first story set in what would become the Hyperion Cantos universe, preceding even "Remembering Siri". Many elements and similarities survived into the later stories (from the name of the centaur Raul, to the concepts of farcasters and the WorldWeb, to the Shrike or the levitation barge or the Sea of Grass). Although the stories did evolve and differ from "The Death of the Centaur" over time there are a number of dissimilarities: in the Cantos, the centaurs of Garden have been exterminated in a genocide by the Hegemony, and the world The Story is set on is not cut off from the farcaster network. There are shared elements with other stories in this volume: the neo-cat Gernisavien appears as a regular cat in "Eyes I Dare Not Meet in Dreams".

==== Plot summary ====
Mr. Kennan apparently entered a master's degree program in Missouri, but on completing it found himself too poor to move back to the Northeast, and so is forced to take a job there teaching for a year.

In the story, Raul and Gernisavien have discovered in the "Man Ruins", a map to the location of the long-forgotten farcaster portal. Hunted by the Wizards, they travel to the city of Carnval. In that city's ancient archives, they discover the key to re-activate the portal. Once activated, they can draw on the expertise of Dobby, the sorcerer-ape. The Wizards trap them in Carnval, and they can only afford to escape aboard the Sky Galleon because Raul risks his life in the Death Game fighting the "genetically-engineered" relic of the Wizard Wars, the fearsome and unbeatable Shrike. Raul survives the requisite three minutes, and wins. After they leave the Sky Galleon, all but Raul are captured by the Wizards and taken to their fortress in the cold mountain fastnesses. There Gernisavien is about to be dissected by a Wizard to get the key which she had swallowed. Kennan plans the grand finale to coincide with the end of the school year; Raul will sacrifice himself in glorious combat with the Wizards while his friends frantically reactivate the farcaster. They will succeed, and return with an army of Humans, freeing their world. But Kennan unexpectedly lands an excellent position in the East at a college, but the exigencies of the situation are such that he must cut short the school year and leave almost immediately. He would be unable to finish The Story. Terry, when Mr. Kennan tells him that he is leaving, rejects him; the details of their discussion are not given. Kennan never sees him again.

In the last days, Terry lets it be known that he knows the ending to The Story. But the tale he tells during the final recess is different from the one Kennan outlined in his letter: Raul successfully breaks into the Wizard fortress, but half-frozen and overwhelmed by their technology, cannot overcome them. He is forced to escape aboard one of their flying craft. Dobby manages to wrench one arm free, but no more, while Gernisavien is securely fastened. They know their only course of action with Raul's defeat is to have Dobby smash some chemicals together. The resulting explosion levels the mountain. Raul is safely away when it happens, but he knows that the explosion means that the quest is dead, for his friends perished with the key and knowledge necessary to reactivate the farcaster.

=== "Two Minutes Forty-five Seconds" ===
"Two Minutes Forty-five Seconds" is a very short story in "high-tech horror" vein. It was published in OMNI Magazine in April 1988. It was also published in the Stephen King-edited horror anthology Flight or Fright in September 2018.

It concerns an engineer of explosives who, through remorse over bowing to his co-workers' blithe dismissal of technical glitches and thereby contributing to a thinly-fictionalized Space Shuttle Challenger disaster, places explosives on the plane carrying himself and the culpable co-workers, thus killing them and committing suicide. The title is a reference to how long it would take the plane to fall to the ocean far below and to how much time's worth of oxygen was expended of the breath-packs found in the wreckage of the Challenger.

=== "Carrion Comfort" ===
"Carrion Comfort" is a novella serialized in OMNI Magazine between September and October 1983. It was later expanded into the novel Carrion Comfort.
