= Endymion (poem) =

Poem by John Keats

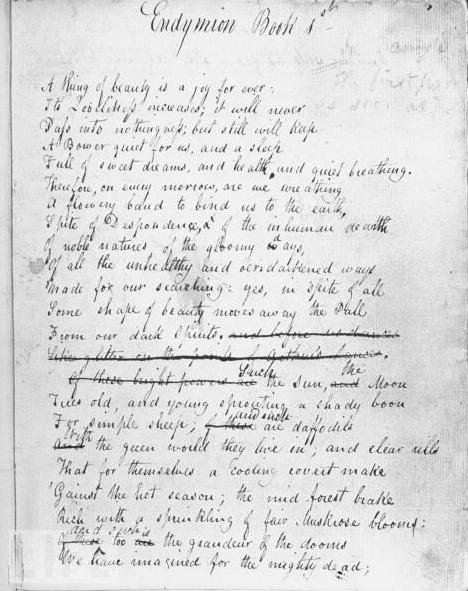
Draft of Endymion by John Keats, c. 1818

Endymion is a poem by John Keats first published in 1818 by Taylor and Hessey of Fleet Street in London. John Keats dedicated this poem to the late poet Thomas Chatterton. The poem begins with the line "A thing of beauty is a joy for ever". Endymion is written in rhyming couplets in iambic pentameter (also known as heroic couplets). Keats based the poem on the Greek myth of Endymion, the shepherd beloved of the moon goddess Selene. The poem elaborates on the original story and renames Selene "Cynthia" (an alternative name for Artemis).

== Narrative ==
It starts by painting a rustic scene of trees, rivers, shepherds, and sheep. The shepherds gather around an altar and pray to Pan, god of shepherds and flocks. As the youths sing and dance, the elder men sit and talk about what life would be like in the shades of Elysium (place). However, Endymion, the "brain-sick shepherd-prince" of Mt. Latmos, is in a trancelike state, and not participating in their discourse. His sister, Peona, takes him away and brings him to her resting place where he sleeps. After he wakes, he tells Peona of his encounter with Cynthia, and how much he liked her.

The poem is divided into four books, each approximately 1,000 lines long. Book I gives Endymion's account of his dreams and experiences, as related to Peona, which provides the background for the rest of the poem. In Book II, Endymion ventures into the underworld in search of his love. He encounters Adonis and Venus—a pairing of mortal and immortal—apparently foreshadowing a similar destiny for the mortal Endymion and his immortal paramour. Book III reveals Endymion's enduring love, and he begs the Moon not to torment him any longer as he journeys through a watery void on the sea floor. There he meets Glaucus, freeing the god from a thousand years of imprisonment by the witch Circe. Book IV, "And so he groan'd, as one by beauty slain." Endymion falls in love with a beautiful Indian maiden. Both ride winged black steeds to Mount Olympus where Cynthia awaits, only for Endymion to forsake the goddess for his new, mortal, love. Endymion and the Indian girl return to earth, the latter saying she cannot be his love. He is miserable, 'til quite suddenly he comes upon the Indian maiden again and she reveals that she is in fact Cynthia. She then tells him of how she tried to forget him, to move on, but that in the end, "'There is not one,/ No, no, not one/ But thee.'"

== Critical reception ==
Endymion received scathing criticism after its release, and Keats himself noted its diffuse and unappealing style. Keats did not regret writing it, as he likened the process to leaping into the ocean to become more acquainted with his surroundings; in a poem to J. A. Hessey, he expressed that "I was never afraid of failure; for I would sooner fail than not be among the greatest." However, he did express regret in its publishing, saying "it is not without a feeling of regret that I make [Endymion] public."

Not all critics disliked the work. The poet Thomas Hood wrote 'Written in Keats' Endymion', in which the "Muse... charming the air to music... gave back Endymion in a dreamlike tale". Henry Morley said, "The song of Endymion throbs throughout with a noble poet's sense of all that his art means for him. What mechanical defects there are in it may even serve to quicken our sense of the youth and freshness of this voice of aspiration."

== In popular culture ==
This poem is quoted by Monsieur Verdoux in Charlie Chaplin's homonymous film, before committing a moonlit murder. "Our feet were soft in flowers...".

The first line ("A thing of beauty is a joy for ever") is quoted by Mary Poppins in the 1964 Disney movie, while she pulls out a potted plant from her bag. It is also referenced by Willy Wonka in the film Willy Wonka & the Chocolate Factory upon introducing the Wonkamobile, and in the 1992 American sports comedy film White Men Can't Jump, written and directed by Ron Shelton. In the beginning of the 1968 animated film Yellow Submarine, the Chief Blue Meanie says, "A thing of beauty. Destroy it forever!" as a parody of the poem.

Nawaaz Amhed's debut novel, Radiant Fugitives, features Keats' poems throughout and specifically mentions Endymion.

Dan Simmons' science fiction novels, Endymion and The Rise of Endymion reference this poem.

In S4E26 of Star Trek: Deep Space 9, "Broken Link", Garak compliments a customer wearing his latest creation, saying "A thing of beauty is a joy forever."

== Opening lines ==
A thing of beauty is a joy for ever:
Its loveliness increases; it will never
Pass into nothingness; but still will keep
A bower quiet for us, and a sleep
Full of sweet dreams, and health, and quiet breathing.
Therefore, on every morrow, are we wreathing
A flowery band to bind us to the earth,
Spite of despondence, of the inhuman dearth
Of noble natures, of the gloomy days,
Of all the unhealthy and o'er-darkened ways
Made for our searching: yes, in spite of all,
Some shape of beauty moves away the pall
From our dark spirits. Such the sun, the moon,
Trees old, and young, sprouting a shady boon
For simple sheep; and such are daffodils
With the green world they live in; and clear rills
That for themselves a cooling covert make
'Gainst the hot season; the mid forest brake,
Rich with a sprinkling of fair musk-rose blooms:
And such too is the grandeur of the dooms
We have imagined for the mighty dead;
All lovely tales that we have heard or read:
An endless fountain of immortal drink,
Pouring unto us from the heaven's brink.

— Book I, lines 1-24

== See also ==
- 1818 in poetry
