= Yggdrasil (disambiguation) =

Yggdrasil is the world tree of Norse mythology.

Yggdrasil may also refer to:

== Arts and entertainment ==
- Yggdrasil (band), a folk band from the Faroe Islands
- Yggdrasil (album), an album by Japanese rock band Bump of Chicken
- "Yggdrasil", a Digimon Data Squad episode
- Yggdrasil: Whose Roots are Stars in The Human Mind, a short film by Stan Brakhage

== Fictional characters and locations ==
- Mithos Yggdrasill, a character in the video game Tales of Symphonia
- The name of the computer that orders the attack on Gloire in the video game Silpheed
- A computer system used to run reality in the manga series Oh My Goddess!
- A sand cruiser in the video game Xenogears, later modified into the Yggdrasil II and Yggdrasil III
- Yggdrasill Corporation, a fictional entity in the tokusatsu series Kamen Rider Gaim
- Yggdrasil Labyrinth, the setting of the video game series Etrian Odyssey
- The name of the game in which the anime series Overlord is set
- The mythical world tree featured in the role-playing video game series Dragon Quest
- A spaceship in the Hyperion novels
- The name of the ongoing miliary operation of the Garlyle Forces in the video game Grandia

== Other uses ==
- Yggdrasil Linux/GNU/X, an early Linux distribution (a computer operating system)
- Yggdrasil (network), a decentralized network protocol
- Ygdrasil Mountain, a mountain in Canada

== See also ==
- Yggdrazil Group, a Thai visual effects company
