= Hard as Nails =

Hard as Nails may refer to:

- Hard as Nails (novel), 2003, by Dan Simmons
- "Hard as Nails" (Static Shock), an episode of Static Shock
- "Hard as Nails", a song by Raven from the album Nothing Exceeds Like Excess
- "Hard As Nails", a song by Ted Nugent from the album Scream Dream, 1980
