= Hardcase =

Hardcase may refer to:

- Hardcase (film), a 1972 American Western television film
- Hardcase (novel), a 2001 novel by Dan Simmons
- Hardcase (comics)

== See also ==
- The Hard Case, a 1995 British short film
