= Vanni Fucci =

Character in Dante's Inferno

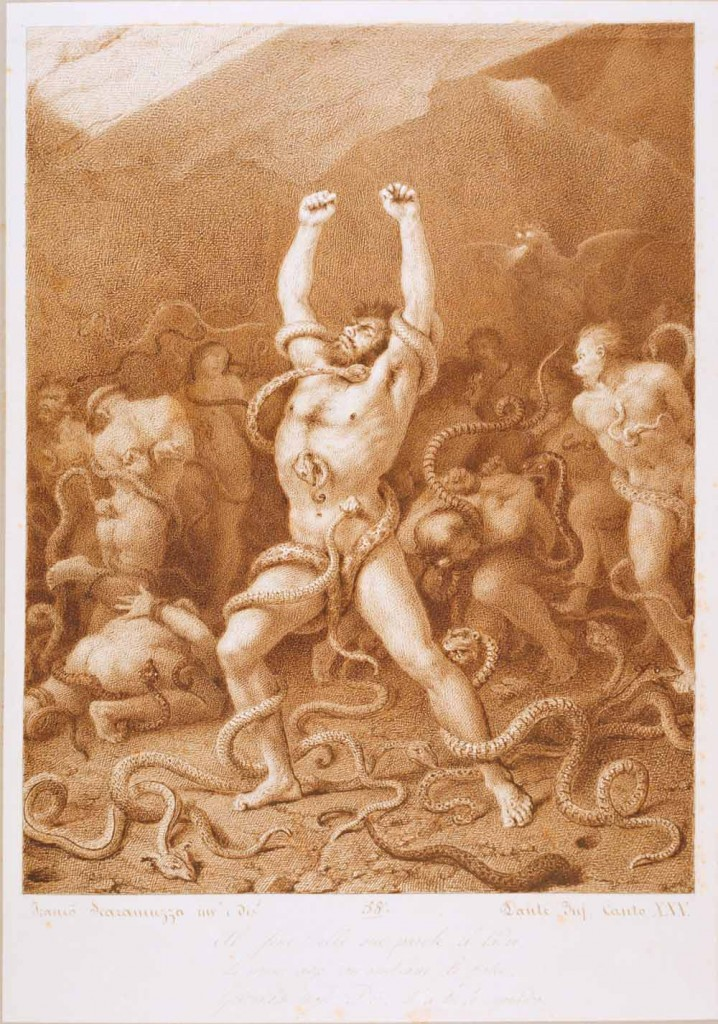
Vanni Fucci as depicted by Francesco Scaramuzza.

Vanni Fucci di Pistoia was a 13th-century Italian and a minor character in Inferno, the first part of Dante Alighieri's epic poem the Divine Comedy, appearing in Cantos XXIV & XXV. He was a thief who lived in Pistoia, as his name ("di Pistoia" meaning "of Pistoia") indicates; when he died, he was sent to the seventh bolgia (round; in Italian, "ditch" or "pouch") of the eighth circle of Hell, where thieves are punished. In that bolgia, his punishment was to be stung by a serpent, reduced to ashes, and then restored to his former shape for more torturing. Dante and Virgil meet him and ask him why he was there. He replied that he stole a treasure from the Church of St. James in his hometown; he had wrongly accused an innocent man, Vanni della Nona, with the crime, for which della Nona was executed. Fucci says he was not caught but he still went to Hell. He then predicts the overthrow of the Florentine Whites to spite Dante and then insults God by making obscene gestures at him, and is attacked by numerous nearby serpents and by the monster Cacus, who was put in the bolgia for stealing Hercules's cattle.

== In later literature ==
Vanni Fucci is a major character in Dan Simmons' 1988 short story "Vanni Fucci Is Alive And Well And Living In Hell"; in it, Fucci appears on a corrupt Alabama televangelist's TV show to punish him, his guests and his studio audience. The name is used again in Simmons' 1992 novel The Hollow Man, in which Vanni Fucci is portrayed as a small-time mafioso and thief, whose backstory includes the theft of a chalice from his hometown church, for which his sole regret is that he was unable to fence it. He is also the subject of Alexander Theroux's poem "The Gesture of Vanni Fucci."
