= Flashback (novel) =

2011 novel by Dan Simmons

- Cover of the trade paperback edition
- Author: Dan Simmons
- Language: English
- Genre: Speculative Fiction, Dystopian fiction, Mystery
- Publisher: Reagan Arthur Books (US)
- Publication date: July 1, 2011
- Publication place: United States
- Media type: Print (Hardback)
- Pages: 554 pp (first edition)
- ISBN: 978-0-316-00696-5

Flashback is a novel written by Dan Simmons. The book was initially published on July 1, 2011 by Reagan Arthur Books. It is a science fiction murder mystery taking place in a dystopian United States where most of the population is addicted to the eponymous "Flashback" drug which allows perfect recall of happy memories. The protagonist, Nick Bottom, is a detective hired to solve the murder of a government official's son.

== Reception ==
Michael Schaub writing for NPR praises its action and pacing, but it's ultimately outweighed by the novels politics. Despite Simmons claiming that it's not a political novel, "Simmons seems unable to keep himself from stopping his book dead with frequent ideological rants". He criticizes the book for claiming that left wing is destroying America and allowing a Muslim Caliphate to rule most of the world. In a more positive review in the Los Angeles Times, Nick Owchar compares the novel's themes to Proust "Life is so full of disappointment, and time moves so swiftly, that memory enables us to recapture those special, transcendent moments in our lives. And to help us forget." and calls it "an intriguing spin on the detective story trope". Salon writer Katherine A. Powers calls it an "atrocious hyper-conservative novel" and questions about how the author of The Terror and Drood can "wither to such smug and censorious dullness?"
