= Endimione =

Endimione is the Italian spelling of Endymion. It may refer to:

- Endimione, a 1706 serenata set by Giovanni Bononcini
  - Endimione, a 1721 serenata set by Antonio Maria Bononcini
- Endimione (de), a 1721 musical serenata by Pietro Metastasio
  - Endimione, a 1743 setting of Metastasio's libretto by Johann Adolph Hasse
  - Endimione, a 1772 serenata by Johann Christian Bach
  - Endimione, a 1776 setting of Metastasio's libretto by Michael Haydn
- Endimione, a character in Cavalli's 1651 libretto La Calisto
