= Cjdns =

Free and open-source decentralized IPv6 network

cjdns
- Cjdns logo
- Developer: Caleb James DeLisle
- Release: January 23, 2012; 14 years ago
- Written in: C; Node.js; Rust
- Operating system: Unix-like, (Android, OpenWrt, Linux, BSD, macOS, iOS), Microsoft Windows
- Platform: x86; x86-64; MIPS architecture; ARM32; AArch64; PowerPC
- Available in: English
- Type: Communication protocol; Anonymity application; Overlay network; Mix network; Decentralized computing
- License: GPLv3
- Website: github.com/cjdelisle/cjdns
- Repository: github.com/cjdelisle/cjdns

Cjdns is an asymmetrically-encrypted IPv6 Virtual Private Network IPv6 using decentralized mesh networking. The network is multiplatform, with clients and servers offered for OpenWRT, FreeBSD, Linux, NetBSD, MacOS, and Windows based on free software using the GPL V3. Unlike TOR, i2p or Hyphanet, total anonymization is not the priority. The goal is to build a trusted, resilient network. This software was originally developed by computer researcher Caleb James DeLisle. His initials represent the first three letters of the network's name.

== Characteristics ==
- The data is encrypted from end to end, so the relays do not need to be trusted.
- packets are routed based on their source, thus making it possible to experiment with network routing algorithms without risk of dropping connections (aided by anti-spoofing).
- Peer connections can be configured as UDP tunnels, or auto-configuration on Layer 2 ethernet via the fc00: IPv6 address space.

== Network deployments ==
Seattle's Meshnet network using Hyperboria runs on cjdns, as well as the Guifi.net network. 21,000 Wi-Fi terminals in Catalonia are based on Cjdns.

A similar network called Santa Cruz Meshnet, is deployed in Santa Cruz.

Similar projects are being carried out in Toronto, Virginia (USA), Germany, France, New York City (NYC Mesh and San Diego.

=== Higher-layer applications ===
Most applications that are compatible with the TCP/IP Internet protocol will work on a Cjdns network, such as video conferencing, for example with Linphone. Other applications specifically developed for Cjdns exist, such as Cjdradio.

== See also ==
- Yggdrasil (network) - another, IPv6 overlay network

== Bibliography ==
- М.А.Дружинин (Druzhinin) (2015). Сетевое издание (ed.). "Характеристики протоколов маршрутизации mesh сетей - Воронежский институт высоких технологий" (PDF). Моделирование, оптим изация и информационные технологии (in Russian). Vol. 9, no. 2. ISSN 2310-6018.CDU : 681.3
