= The Abominable (novel) =

Novel by Dan Simmons

- Cover of US edition
- Author: Dan Simmons
- Language: English
- Genre: Thriller, Historical fiction, Action Adventure
- Publisher: Little, Brown and Company (US)
- Publication date: October 22, 2013
- Publication place: United States
- Media type: Print (Hardback)
- Pages: 663 pp (first edition)
- ISBN: 978-0-751-55028-3

The Abominable is a novel written by Dan Simmons. The book was initially published on October 22, 2013 by Little, Brown and Company. It is a historical thriller taking place in 1924 about an explorer named Richard Deacon who is hired to search for the body of young man who died attempting to summit Mount Everest.

== Plot ==
The story begins with a first-person meta-narrative as an unnamed author meets an elderly man named Jake Perry on Long Island, who gives him a large journal that he had kept in some boxes.

In 1924, Lady Bromley, a British aristocrat, invites Richard Deacon, a young English explorer, to her home with an impossible proposal: 10,000 pounds if he can bring the body of her son from the slopes of Mt. Everest back home. Deacon first stops in pre-Nazi Germany to find an inventor of a breathing apparatus that can assist in the climb. Gathering a small crew, including Jake Perry, the explorer heads to Nepal to search for a body in the vast snowfields of the world's largest mountain. When they get there, they find that a group of Nazis is also strangely interested in their quest.

== Reception ==
Kirkus Reviews called it "a lively, eminently entertaining adventure that would do Edgar Allan Poe—and even Rudyard Kipling—proud." Michael Robbins writing for the Chicago Tribune gave an overwhelmingly negative review of the novel. Stating that his dislike of the book is separate from his dislike of Simmons personally, he cites its clunky prose, thin characters, and absurd reveals concluding "I regret having spent a single second reading this novel that I could have devoted to watching my toenails grow".. Writing for The Washington Post, Victor LaValle reviewed it more positively calling the book "fun" and that " I felt Simmons had led me on an epic journey, and I was grateful for it". However the middle of the book suffers due to the extreme amount of detail Simmons put into describing mountaineering.
