= Song of Kali =

Novel by Dan Simmons

- Hardcover first edition
- Author: Dan Simmons
- Language: English
- Genre: Horror
- Publisher: Bluejay Books
- Publication date: November 1, 1985
- Publication place: United States
- Media type: Print (hardcover & paperback)
- Pages: 311
- Awards: World Fantasy Award, 1986
- ISBN: 978-0747200338

Song of Kali is a horror novel by American writer Dan Simmons, published in 1985. The story deals with an American intellectual who travels to Calcutta, India, where he becomes embroiled in mysterious and horrific events at the centre of which lies a cult of Kapalikas that worships Kali.

== Plot summary ==
In 1977, poet Robert Luczak is sent by the American literary magazine Harper's Magazine to Calcutta to locate poetry alleged to have been recently authored by a legendary Bengali poet, M. Das. He also hopes to procure secondary rights for magazine Other Voices, where he works as an editor with his friend Abe. The literary world considers this development newsworthy because Das disappeared and is presumed to have died eight years ago. Amrita, Robert's British Indian wife and a mathematician, and their infant daughter Victoria accompany him on his assignment.

Upon arriving in a chaotic night in the city, he is met by M. T. Krishna, a local intellectual who claims to have been asked to assist them by Abe. The next day Robert meets with the local writers guild who were the source of the few bits of poetry that made their way to America. When he asks to meet Das, he is told this is impossible. Robert considers leaving Calcutta at this point, his duty done, but feels that he doesn't yet have enough material for an interesting article. The night before he and his family are to leave, Krishna returns and takes Robert to a man who can provide him with information relevant to his story and interprets for Robert.

The man tells how he and a friend tried to join a religious secret society dedicated to Kali, the Hindu goddess associated with death and destruction. One of the prerequisites was for each initiate to bring a corpse to a secret temple, there to be laid at the feet of a statue of Kali. One of the corpses, bloated and decayed after being dredged from the river, is chosen by Kali, vivified by her, and reanimates. Krishna's associate claims this corpse is said to be that of the poet, Das.

Robert finds the man's tale too fantastical to believe, and still hopes to meet and interview the poet. While he is not granted an interview with Das, Robert receives an extensive manuscript collection of Das' poetry, which is very different from his earlier work, describing dark, mystical, grotesque, and apocalyptic happenings.

Robert again insists that the writers guild allow him to see Das, and threatens to call them and the manuscript a fraud in his article. This time they agree. He is brought through the Calcutta slums by gangsters belonging to the cult of Kali, and taken to the poet. Shocked by the man’s appearance, Robert first takes him for a reanimated corpse, but then recognizes the symptoms as the advanced stages of leprosy. Das confirms that he is suffering from the affliction, but also insists that he really did return from death. Robert is unconvinced, feeling Das may be going along with the cult members who might be holding him captive. Das then asks him to bring him books of poetry, making a reference to a certain poem about a suicide to hint that he really wants the means to kill himself.

Becoming concerned at the eerie and sometimes frightening events that he has experienced, Robert attempts to send his wife and child home, but they are unable to get on a flight. Concealing a gun (given to him previously by Krishna) in one of the books he has bought for Das, he returns to the poet. Robert leaves the books and departs, but, as he exits the house, hears two gunshots. Das is dead. Robert is captured by guards and drugged after they break his left pinky. He awakens to find himself in a temple of Kali, where the statue of the goddess seems to come to life and attack him (though it is left deliberately ambiguous as to whether this actually happens, or is instead a hallucination). He is loaded into the back of a truck by the cultists to be taken somewhere, but manages to escape with Krishna's help. He returns to the hotel, only to find his wife informing the police that their daughter has been kidnapped.

After a couple days of dead-end leads, an Indian couple is caught at the airport trying to take someone resembling Victoria out of the country. Robert and Amrita go to identify their child, but find that she is already dead.

With their child dead, and no hope of finding the perpetrators of the crime nor bringing them to justice, Robert and his wife return to America. Robert decides to destroy the poetry, and, gradually, the couple's relationship worsens. Robert still wrestles with the desire for revenge, and after training himself in the use of firearms he returns to Calcutta with a smuggled handgun, intending to track down and kill everyone he considers responsible. At the last moment, however, he manages to resist what he believes to be the "Song of Kali" - the force of devastation, cruelty and madness that exists somewhere within every human heart. He returns to the US, reconciles with Amrita, and comes to terms with the events that have befallen him and his family.

Whispers can still be heard, though, of the "Song of Kali", the condition of humanity dominated by hatred and violence, perfectly embodied, in the mind of the narrator, by the squalor and chaos of Calcutta.

== Reception ==
Song of Kali won the 1986 World Fantasy Award for Best Novel.

In 2024, James Nicoll stated that the novel's "plot doesn't really make a lot of sense" and that "Simmons' version of Hinduism is such a grotesque caricature that one must assume that he did no real research at all"; he also noted that it "stands out for [its] sheer unmotivated hatred and xenophobia", and observed that its status as an award-winner and its contemporary positive reviews mean that "(t)here was obviously an audience for whom [the novel's] bigotry (...) was not an issue".
