= The Crook Factory =

1999 novel by Dan Simmons

- Hardcover edition
- Author: Dan Simmons
- Language: English
- Publisher: William Morrow
- Publication date: March 1, 1999
- Publication place: United States
- Media type: Print
- Pages: 448 (hardcover)
- ISBN: 978-0380973682

The Crook Factory is a thriller novel by American author Dan Simmons. The book was initially published by William Morrow on March 1, 1999. The novel tells a fictionalized version of the real life counter-espionage and spy ring, known as the Crook Factory, that was set up by Ernest Hemingway in Cuba during World War II.

== Overview ==
The novel is narrated by Joe Lucas, an FBI agent who is sent to Cuba by J. Edgar Hoover to monitor Hemingway's activities. Lucas is at first bewildered why the director of the FBI has taken a personal interest in Hemingway and his spy network, which Lucas considers amateurish and almost silly. As the novel unfolds it becomes clear that Hemingway's ragtag organization is at the center of a complicated game of war-time counter-intelligence involving the FBI, the OSS, British intelligence, and the two German intelligence organizations operating at that time, the Sicherheitsdienst (SD) and the Abwehr. Lucas goes from a reluctant monitor of Hemingway to an active participant in the Crook Factory's operations.

== Basis on actual events ==
While the novel is fictional, it incorporates multiple real events and almost all real people as characters. An author's note at the end of the novel reveals that many of the novel's events are based in fact, most notably the existence and organization of the Crook Factory, along with Hoover's interest in Hemingway, the support Hemingway received from the US Ambassador to Cuba, the activities of German intelligence agents in Cuba and South America, and the various historical and celebrity figures who frequented the finca where Hemingway lived outside Havana.
