= The Hollow Man (Simmons novel) =

1992 novel by Dan Simmons

- Hardcover edition
- Author: Dan Simmons
- Language: English
- Genre: Science fiction
- Publisher: Bantam Books
- Publication date: September 1, 1992
- Publication place: United States
- Media type: Print
- Pages: 293 (hardcover)
- ISBN: 978-0553082524

The Hollow Man is a novel by American author Dan Simmons. The book was initially published by Bantam Books on September 1, 1992. It narrates the story of a university lecturer who has the ability to "hear" the thoughts of others, an ability he shares with his dying wife.

There are numerous themes in this novel which are expanded in later works, most notably a set of theories on the nature of and perception of reality (see Ilium). Conversely at least one character, Vanni Fucci, appears in Simmons' earlier 1988 work, "Vanni Fucci Is Alive and Well and Living in Hell". The Hollow Man was nominated for a Locus Award in 1993.

The novel itself is an expansion of an earlier short story, "Eyes I Dare Not Meet in Dreams", that appeared in his 1990 collection Prayers to Broken Stones. Original ideas and characters behind much of Simmons's subsequent works can be found in this collection.

== Plot summary ==
After the death of his wife Gail, Jeremy Bremen leaves his previous life by burning his home and possessions and embarking on a journey to find peace from the "neurobabble" of humanity. Without his wife's presence Bremen cannot shield himself from the unwanted ability to read minds and hear thoughts.

Bremen searches for solitude and isolation from people, which he initially finds; however, as the novel progresses, he is exposed to increasing levels of contact with humanity and horrifying experiences of malicious and violent behaviour.

Transposed with Bremen's story is that of another character, Robby, who appears to be narrating and commenting upon Bremen and his wife's life. Robby is severely disabled and unable to communicate as he is deaf, mute, and blind. How he is able to have such familiarity with Bremen is not disclosed until towards the end of the novel.
