= Carrion Comfort =

1989 novel by Dan Simmons

- Hardcover 1st edition
- Author: Dan Simmons
- Language: English
- Genre: Horror
- Publisher: Dark Harvest
- Publication date: January 1, 1989
- Publication place: United States
- Media type: Print (hardcover & paperback)
- Pages: 636
- Awards: Bram Stoker Award (1989); Locus Poll Award (1990); August Derleth Award
- ISBN: 978-0913165379

Carrion Comfort is a science fiction/horror novel by American writer Dan Simmons, published in 1989 in hardcover by Dark Harvest and in 1990 in paperback by Warner Books. It won the Bram Stoker Award, the Locus Poll Award for Best Horror Novel, and the August Derleth Award for Best Novel. It is based on a novelette of the same title, published in 1983 in the magazine Omni. The first half of the novelette makes up chapter 1 of the novel, while the second half forms chapter 3.

The novel portrays a tiny fraction of humanity that has immense psychic powers, which they refer to as "The Ability.” These powers can be used to completely control people from a distance to commit any physical action, including murder. This Ability has been used throughout history to have a direct or indirect influence, via the perceived charisma of world leaders or the actions of more covert individuals, on everything from individual senseless murders to the Holocaust. Across multiple timelines, the novel mostly follows two groups of amoral people in 1980, some with aspirations of world domination, as their clashing involves a group of investigators. These non-psychic investigators follow a series of bizarre murders to the conclusion that a cabal of powerful psychics must be stopped.

== Characters ==
- Dr Saul Laski, a psychiatrist who survived the Holocaust in World War II, spent time in Israel, and who currently works at Columbia University.
- Sheriff Bobby Joe Gentry, initially investigating murders in Charleston, South Carolina.
- Natalie Preston, a photographer whose father was killed and is determined to get answers and revenge.
- Tony Harod, a powerful Hollywood producer with minor use of 'The Ability' which he can only use on females. He often helps The Island Club with hopes of becoming a member.

=== The Trio ===
- Melanie Fuller, a powerful user of 'The Ability' at least as far back as the early 1910s in Vienna, Austria.
- Nina Drayton, a childhood friend of Melanie Fuller and an equally powerful user.
- Willi Borden, also known as Wilhelm Von Borchert, a Nazi Oberst, an Officer in the SS, later reinventing his identity as a Hollywood producer and powerful user of 'The Ability'.

=== The Island Club ===
- C. Arnold Barent, a billionaire industrialist with a penchant for extreme security measures. He owns a network of private islands, ships, and planes. His use of 'The Ability' is unequaled by anyone he has ever met.
- Charles Colben, a director of the FBI with use of "The Ability".
- Nieman Trask, a user of "The Ability", an aide to a Senior Senator from Maine.
- Joseph Kepler, a user of "The Ability", a member of the FBI.
- Reverend Jimmy Wayne Sutter, an incredibly influential and successful televangelist who uses "The Ability" mainly to get obscenely rich.

The characters Saul and Natalie, learning about the actions of The Trio and The Island Club, observe that these people with immense psychic powers could be considered a type of vampire, as they feed off the energy of those they indirectly kill to gain youth and energy.

== Plot summary ==
The story begins in 1942, with a man named Saul Laski who fears for his life while at the Chełmno extermination camp built by Germans during World War II in Poland. He is determined to resist being taken away in the night but something supernatural compels him to obey the orders of the Schutzstaffel.

It continues in 1980 with a meeting of Melanie, Nina, and Willi in Charleston, South Carolina. They discuss a game that involves using an innate power they have, which they call an Ability, to take remote control of people simply through thought and cause them to do anything. When these people are controlled to murder, it imparts those with the Ability to look and feel younger and more alive. As each member of the group presents their recent exploits, such as the murder of John Lennon, a tension and unease between them is revealed as a kind of truce. When Willi's plane explodes the next day, Melanie suspects Nina and then a fight ensues, with both characters using innocent bystanders as soldiers and victims in a bizarre series of brutal murders involving children, old men, and security guards until Nina is shot in the head and dies.

=== An investigation ===
There is a police and FBI investigation into a bizarre series of seemingly unconnected murders that span down a street on a single night as Sheriff Gentry and FBI Agent Haines interview a visiting psychologist named Saul Laski. Saul is famous for his theories about seemingly strange and impossible violence, but is as stumped as the sheriff. Later, Saul is compelled to break into the house where the murders started to investigate, and meets Natalie; who has come for the same reason; to find out why her father, a photographer used and murdered in the battle, has died so bizarrely. After realizing they are both looking for answers, Saul reveals to Natalie that he has a past with supernatural violence, having been used by someone with the Ability in Chełmno long ago, ever since looking to find the SS Officer, an Oberst, who controlled him in a perverse series of ways, including as a living pawn in a life-size game of chess with a Nazi General where each piece removed from the board was executed. As the chess game ended, Saul continued to be used to hunt down the Nazi General, who apparently had a weaker Ability than the Oberst. Saul is controlled to kill the General. Regaining his willpower for a moment in an explosion, he flees into the forest and survives the rest of the holocaust amongst Partisan Polish and later Partisan Jewish forces before finding solace in Zionist Israel. This story is shared with sheriff Gentry later.

=== The Island Club ===
Sheriff Gentry, now the only one investigating the murders as the FBI has shown no interest, realizes he is being followed. Eventually he confronts his follower, who instead of speaking immediately attacks Gentry and is killed in the ensuing struggle. There is no record of the person existing in US Government files, which leads Gentry to begin to believe Saul's incredible story. It is revealed that the reason the FBI was quick to stop investigating is that it is in part controlled by elements of the 'Island Club,' a Cabal of influential people with The Ability in the United States, such as Charles Colben of the FBI and Special Agent Haines, as well as billionaire C. Arnold Barent, Senatorial aide Nieman Trask, an influential Televangelist, and others. They discuss that Ayatollah Khomeini has a weak ability and thought he was the only one, and thus saw himself as godlike. They also discuss that they are manipulating the 1980 United States presidential election by way of the Iran Hostage Crisis to ensure Ronald Reagan's election. Willi kills a member of the club through long-distance use of a controlled surrogate to get their attention, asking to be a part of the games.

Meanwhile, Melanie flees, accessing hidden identities and bank accounts throughout the US, and prepares to hide using identities and money she has waiting in France. At the Atlanta Airport, she is terrified by a courtesy phone call when she hears Nina's voice, convincing her that somehow Nina has cheated death, perhaps with a stronger Ability than previously known. Melanie uses people in a blind panic and ends up in Germantown, Philadelphia. She meets and conditions a new pawn, a hitchhiking thug called Vincent, into a mute killer. Saul, after years of working with various groups to track down the Oberst, believes he has found him—a man named Willi Borden. Saul hires Private detectives to track Willi, but they either disappear in Los Angeles or die. Saul reaches out to family members working in the Mossad for help in the same search for Willi Borden. This leads to his nephew Aaron, as well as Aaron's wife and children, being killed by agents of the Island Club.

=== Events in Philadelphia ===
Melanie begins setting up a new series of controlled helpers and a new life in Philadelphia. Verbally harassed by gang members, she begins sending Vincent to brutally butcher and impale the heads of gang members as a warning, which sparks further violence in the community but also draws the attention of both Saul's group and the Island Club. Tony Harod, a vile Hollywood producer who only uses his Ability to subjugate and rape women, has been offered a membership in the Island Club if he agrees to help hunt down Willi and Melanie. He arrives in Philadelphia as all other characters arrive for a variety of reasons, the Island Club using the CIA and FBI to cordon off Germantown, Philadelphia from any outside intervention, including police and firefighters. As Natalie and Gentry investigate, the Island Club uses a bus full of people to attack them—and they flee to the safety of the gang since no authorities arrive to help. A huge firefight erupts as Natalie and Gentry marshall the gang forces against the "voodoo woman" who killed their comrades against those she controls, while the FBI adds to the violence in an attempt to flush out either Willi or Melanie, as well as kill Gentry and Natalie for knowing too much. Gentry and Natalie get to the house and almost to Melanie, but Vincent attacks, killing Gentry, as Natalie kills Vincent. Melanie has been driven more insane by the thought of Nina being alive, and sees the violence erupting around her through her lens of racism as a bad northern neighborhood gone worse. Melanie escapes, controlling one old woman in a car. She is followed by Charles Colben of the Island Club in a helicopter with a rifle. The controlled old woman is shot. Melanie manages to destroy the helicopter and Colben through use of the old woman who appears dead but can be pushed beyond human limits by her Ability, and escapes to a park where she meets and takes over a family.

Saul and Natalie escape wounded but alive, heal, and get help from the Mossad revealing some but not all information about the Island Club. They manage to get supplies for a complicated trap for Tony Harod. They kidnap him in Los Angeles and take him to a secret interrogation room operated by the Mossad in an abandoned barn east of San Juan Capistrano, California off the Ortega Highway. There Tony Harod is interrogated under drugs to find out as much as possible about the Island Club and the Ability in general—getting info from EEG readouts as Tony tries in vain to control Natalie to escape. The EEG reveals information about a theta rhythm signature that occurs when people with the Ability attempt to control others. Harod believes this interrogation about the Island Club is the work of Willi, using Saul and Natalie, and he is released, being told to follow Willi's instructions, upon penalty of death, through his supposed pawns (Saul and Natalie). Saul realizes as they are packing up that he is being pursued by FBI Agent Haines, and sets the barn on fire and flees with Natalie. They eventually kill Haines just outside Lake Elsinore, CA and escape, lost in a stolen car along fire service roads until ending up in Fallbrook, California.

=== Island Club Games ===
The Island Club "games" begin on a private island of C. Arnold Barent. Willi has apparently been working with the televangelist to vote to take the Island Club "games" global. This means they will not simply control a few people on the private island to see who is the most powerful, but control leaders of nations with nuclear results. Willi has shown his power earlier by using one of two people stationed in the control room at an Air Force missile silo in Meriden, Wyoming to demonstrate his ability to instigate United States-USSR nuclear war. Saul and Natalie plan to infiltrate the island. Saul will pose as one of the runaways used as human pawns in the island games, being brought there by Tony Harod as instructed after his interrogation. Natalie, back in Charleston, has found Melanie and convinced Melanie that Natalie is an agent of Nina warning her of Willi's power (his death on the plane was faked) and the Island Club's growing power.

The story's action climaxes at the private island. Saul becomes a willing pawn in the "game," having trained himself with self-hypnosis for months to memorize as many details as possible of the lives of death camp victims and survivors of the holocaust so that when Willi attempts to control him, the memories of others will confuse Willi in a way that will gain Saul a few seconds to attack and kill the old man. Willi takes over the "use and hunt" aspect of the "game" and suggests taking the game global—which he and the televangelist support, and Barent and Kepler don't. Harod, being technically a full voting member of the club, abstains; caring less about old ambitions and more about surviving. The night quickly becomes a contest between those with superior Ability: Willi and Barent. They agree to play a living chess game for the fate of the "games" to come. If Willi wins, the game becomes global in lethality. If Barent wins, its barbarism is contained to the island. Saul gets his chance and kills Willi, who won the chess game. As Barent leaves, he is killed by Melanie's use of surrogates, coerced by Natalie back in Charleston. The book ends with Natalie going that same night on a suicide mission to finally kill Melanie and her collection of family, nurse, and doctor pawns. She barely succeeds, but it is revealed she only killed someone Melanie made to look like a body double through surgery and obfuscation. The book ends with Melanie comfortable and unchallenged in her abilities in France, keeping tabs on control of officers of a nuclear submarine.

== Title ==
The title of the novel appears to be taken from the sonnet Carrion Comfort written in 1885-87 by Gerard Manley Hopkins.

== Historical references ==
The timelines of the story in 1940s Poland and Israel, and as well as The United States in the 1980s are framed within and often reference actual events being directly or indirectly manipulated by characters with 'The Ability':

- Chełmno extermination camp, Sobibor extermination camp, and the events at Sobibor, October 14, 1943, 4 p.m.
- Simon Wiesenthal's Nazi hunters, the Soviet People's Standing Tribunal on Fascist War Crimes and Allied war crimes tribunals such as the Nuremberg Trials
- The murder of John Lennon
- The Iranian hostage crisis
- The election of U.S. President Ronald Reagan, and his attempted assassination
- The actions of the Mossad and the PLO in the 1980s; kibbutz-building in Israel
- The estate of Willi and the establishment of a National Park at Bayerisch Eisenstein
- Grumblethorpe, the Fuller House, and other historic houses on the National Register of Historic Places
