= Hard as Nails (novel) =

2003 novel by Dan Simmons

- Author: Dan Simmons
- Publisher: Minotaur
- Publication date: October 13, 2003
- ISBN: 0-312-30528-1

Hard as Nails is a 2003 novel by American writer Dan Simmons. It is the third of three hardboiled detective novels featuring the character of Joe Kurtz.

The novel begins shortly after a near-death experience when Kurtz was shot in the head. As the pain begins to subside, he remembers details from the shooting, including that he was not alone when it happened: his parole officer had been at his side. Meanwhile, crime is ramping up, and soon, Kurtz finds himself in a remote mountainous region with numerous criminals hunting him down for his past wrongs, though he finds himself wondering whether the criminals were after him or his parole officer.

Hard as Nails received mixed reviews from critics. Kirkus Reviews referred to the novel as a "page turner", while Publishers Weekly called it a "disappointing mishmash" with "a climax that's well-nigh incomprehensible". They further wrote, "Any one, or two, of these plots would have made for a suspenseful mystery. Why Simmons insists on cramming them all into a 288-page novel is a mystery in itself. Surely he can't lack the courage of his fictional convictions? Unfortunately, it seems that way, and with so much going on, the novel lapses into a welter of absurdities."

== Publication history ==
- Simmons, Dan (2003). Hard as Nails: A Joe Kurtz Novel. Macmillan. ISBN 978-0-312-30528-4.
- Simmons, Dan (2017). Hard as Nails. ISBN 978-0-316-40471-6.
