= HMS Endymion =

Four ships of the Royal Navy have been named HMS Endymion after the Greek hero Endymion.

- HMS Endymion (1779), launched in 1779, was a 44-gun Roebuck-class fifth rate. She was wrecked on a coral reef near the Turks and Caicos Islands on 23 August 1790.
- HMS Endymion (1797), launched in 1797, was the lead ship of the Endymion-class frigates. She served in the French Revolutionary and Napoleonic Wars. In the War of 1812 she fought a duel with USS President on 15 January 1815, disabling the American ship. She became a receiving ship in 1859 and was broken up in June 1868.
- HMS Endymion (1865), launched in 1865, was a screw frigate. She was decommissioned in 1879 and lent for use as a hospital ship in 1881. Sold out of service in 1885, she was used as an administration ship until 1904, being sold for scrapping in December of that year.
- HMS Endymion (1891), launched in 1891, was an Edgar-class cruiser. She served in World War I and was broken up in 1921.
