= Drood (novel) =

Novel by Dan Simmons

- Hardcover first edition
- Author: Dan Simmons
- Language: English
- Genre: Psychological Thriller, Historical fiction
- Publisher: Little, Brown and Company (US), Quercus (United Kingdom)
- Publication date: February 1, 2009
- Publication place: United States
- Media type: Print (Hardback)
- Pages: 777 pp (first edition)
- ISBN: 978-0-316-00702-3
- OCLC: 225870345
- Dewey Decimal: 813/.54 22
- LC Class: PS3569.I47292 D76 2009

Drood is a novel written by Dan Simmons. The book was initially published on February 1, 2009 by Little, Brown and Company. It is a fictionalized account of the last five years of Charles Dickens' life.

== Overview ==
The book is a fictionalized account of the last five years of Charles Dickens' life told from the viewpoint of Dickens' friend and fellow author, Wilkie Collins. The title comes from Dickens' unfinished novel, The Mystery of Edwin Drood. The novel's complex plot mixes fiction with biographical facts from the lives of Dickens, Collins, and other literary and historical figures of the Victorian era, complicated even further by the narrator's constant use of opium and opium derivatives such as laudanum, rendering him an unreliable narrator.

== Film ==
In 2008, Guillermo del Toro was attached to direct a film adaptation of Drood for Universal Pictures, but the project has not occurred.
