= Hardcase (novel) =

2001 crime novel by Dan Simmons

- Author: Dan Simmons
- Language: English
- Series: Joe Kurtz
- Genre: Crime, Hardboiled fiction
- Publisher: St. Martin’s Press
- Publication date: 2001
- Publication place: United States
- Media type: Print (hardcover, paperback)
- Pages: 304
- Followed by: Hard Freeze

Hardcase is a crime novel by American writer Dan Simmons, first published in 2001 by St. Martin’s Press. It is the first novel in the Joe Kurtz series, which marked Simmons’ entry into the hardboiled detective genre, a departure from his better-known science fiction and horror works.

== Plot summary ==
Joe Kurtz, an ex-private investigator and ex-con, is recently released from Attica State Prison after serving an 11-year sentence for manslaughter. He exacted revenge for his partner's murder and, upon release, is drawn into a mob family feud in Buffalo, hired by Don Byron Farino to find the family's missing accountant. Kurtz navigates a violent world of organized crime, double-crosses, and ruthless enforcers. The narrative is marked by quick pacing, hardboiled dialogue, and a strong sense of place.

=== Characters ===
- Joe Kurtz: The antihero, a tough, resourceful ex-PI.
- Byron Farino: The ailing mafia don, seeking stability in his criminal empire.
- Angelina Farino: Don’s calculating daughter.
- Phil Farino: Don’s son and potential successor.

== Background and development ==
Simmons is known for his versatility across horror, science fiction, and now crime fiction, deliberately evoking the traditions of Richard Stark's Parker novels for Hardcase.

== Themes ==
Hardcase channels classic noir tropes: bleak morality, violence, atmospheric urban decay, and psychological intensity.

== Publication and series ==
- Hardcover: St. Martin’s Press, 2001 (ISBN 978-0312274395)
- Paperback: Subsequent editions by Mulholland Books
- First in the Joe Kurtz series, followed by Hard Freeze and Hard as Nails.

== Critical reception ==
Hardcase was met with positive reviews. Kirkus Reviews praised its "hard-edged prose" and fast pace. Booklist noted Simmons' skill with action and noir narrative. Some commentators noted that while the plot is traditional, Simmons' execution stands out.
