= The Fall of Hyperion (novel) =

1990 novel by Dan Simmons

- Cover of first edition (hardcover)
- Author: Dan Simmons
- Cover artist: Gary Ruddell
- Language: English
- Series: Hyperion Cantos
- Genre: Science fiction
- Publisher: Doubleday
- Publication date: March 1990
- Publication place: United States
- Media type: Print (Hardcover & Paperback)
- Pages: 517
- Awards: Locus Award for Best Science Fiction Novel (1991)
- ISBN: 0-385-24950-0 (First edition)
- OCLC: 20093277
- Dewey Decimal: 813/.54 20
- LC Class: PS3569.I47292 F35 1990
- Preceded by: Hyperion
- Followed by: Endymion

The Fall of Hyperion is the second novel in the Hyperion Cantos, a science fiction series by American author Dan Simmons. The novel, published in 1990, won both the 1991 British Science Fiction and Locus Awards. It was also nominated for the Hugo Award and the Nebula Award.

Set in the 29th century, the novel documents a pilgrimage to the planet Hyperion. The seven pilgrims intend to travel to the Valley of the Time Tombs, where the Shrike, a metallic creature alleged to grant one wish to the members of a pilgrimage, dwells. Powerful entities such as the Hegemony of Man and the Artificial Intelligence (AI) TechnoCore seek to influence the pilgrims' journey.

The Hyperion Cantos is influenced strongly by various works, including the teachings of the environmentalist John Muir and the poetry of John Keats; a reincarnation of Keats narrates The Fall of Hyperion. The novel also contains explicit references to classical literature and modern writings, including the scientific works of the Jesuit and paleontologist Pierre Teilhard de Chardin, the physicist Stephen Hawking, and some of the fiction of author Jack Vance.

== Plot ==
The Hegemony is an interstellar governmental entity formed by many planets, most of which are connected by instantaneous farcaster portals. Some worlds, like Hyperion, have no farcaster portals and are sparsely settled; they are known as the "Outback". The farcasters are created and managed by the TechnoCore, an AI civilization. While the Core's physical location is unknown, they interact with humans through various virtual realities.

The Hegemony is opposed by the Ousters, genetically modified humans that fled the Hegemony's growing influence even before Earth was destroyed. The Ousters have mutated physically, believing that they should adapt to their outer-space surroundings rather than adapt the surroundings themselves. They have rarely fought full-scale conflicts with the Hegemony but are currently launching an invasion of Hyperion.

=== Severn's narrative dreams of the pilgrims ===
Joseph Severn, the name assumed by a second John Keats AI persona, has dreams of the pilgrims on Hyperion. He reports these dreams to Hegemony CEO Meina Gladstone, allowing the government to have real-time access to information about the pilgrims.

Father Hoyt is killed by the Shrike. The Consul leaves to retrieve his ship from Keats. Father Hoyt's body is resurrected into Father Paul Duré. Silenus goes to the Poets' City to complete his Cantos, but is surprised by the Shrike and impaled on the Tree of Pain. Lamia is also attacked by the Shrike and loses consciousness. She awakens in one of the TechnoCore's computerized realities, in the company of Johnny. Lamia and Johnny converse with an AI named Ummon, which reveals some of the motivations of the TechnoCore and the existence of a war between human and AI ultimate intelligences. Johnny is killed by Ummon, and Lamia is released.

The Shrike appears and takes Kassad through a portal. Moneta explains that the Shrike can be controlled by one who defeats it in single combat. Kassad agrees to fight the Shrike. He is transported to a future Hyperion where the planet is desolate and without an atmosphere. All that remains is the Tree of Pain, the tombs, and hundreds of Shrikes. Vowing to save the victims impaled on the Tree, Kassad charges.

At the Tombs, Het Masteen reappears. Before dying, he reveals that the Shrike Cult has colluded with the Templar Brotherhood, and claims that he was meant to pilot the Tree of Pain through space and time. Shortly thereafter, Father Duré disappears. Minutes before the time of Rachel's birth and the simultaneous opening of the Time Tombs, Sol offers her to the Shrike, who carries her into the Tombs.

=== Severn's actions ===
Meina Gladstone positions Severn as a member of her staff. Gladstone is informed that the Ousters have counterattacked, attacking the WorldWeb itself in an unprecedented and unexpected move that appeared impossible. Since FORCE fleets have been committed to the Hyperion system, the first wave of worlds threatened by the Ouster invasion seems destined to fall. As sudden Shrike Cult uprisings devastate major Hegemony planets, Severn travels to Pacem and encounters Father Duré, who had been transported to Pacem by the Shrike. Intrigued by the collusion of the Templar Brotherhood with the Shrike Cult, Duré travels to God's Grove, which is soon to be attacked by the Ousters. Severn and Gladstone's chief of staff, Leigh Hunt, attempts to farcast to Tau Ceti Center. Instead, they arrive on a world that is an apparent replica of Old Earth, on the way to Rome, the place of the original Keats's death. Like the original Keats, Severn dies of tuberculosis while the Shrike keeps watch outside, preventing Hunt from leaving with Severn until his physical form dies; his persona retreats into the TechnoCore.

=== Conclusion ===
The Consul meets with the leaders of the Ouster Swarm and learns that the Ousters are not responsible for the attack against the WorldWeb. The TechnoCore is the only power capable of launching such an attack. The Consul tells Gladstone the truth about the attack. Admiral Lee sends a transmission showing an autopsy on a supposed Ouster from their battlefleet, but the body destroys itself by consuming itself in the same manner as the Core cybrids do, confirming the intel that the supposed Ouster attacks are really Core attacks. The only Ouster swarm attack is the one on Hyperion. Through a dream, Severn tells Gladstone that the TechnoCore resides completely within the farcaster system. They fear other intelligences found in the Void Which Binds, another dimension through which the farcaster portals pass. Gladstone orders the immediate destruction of the farcaster network. General Morpurgo leads a ship supposedly on its way to Hyperion with a Core deathwand technology designed to kill any human on the surface and all of the Ouster swarm. Instead, the General and his son time their transit so that they are inside the farcaster system during its destruction, destroying themselves along with the weapon, saving Hyperion. The WorldWeb disintegrates; mass chaos and riots ensue. Gladstone allows herself to be killed by the rioters, as partial penance for the suffering she caused. The fatline, which utilizes the Void Which Binds for faster-than-light communication, is suddenly shut down by the human Universal Intelligence which exists therein, for unknown reasons.

On Hyperion, Lamia frees Silenus and destroys the Shrike through an unknown power. Rachel appears outside the Time Tombs as a young woman, carrying her infant self. She explains that she is Moneta and is traveling back in time with the Shrike under orders from humanity's future. Sol enters the portal to raise the infant Rachel in the far future.

Several months later, the worst of the chaos caused by the Fall has abated. The novel ends with the Consul returning to the former Web Worlds in his starship to discover what happened, with Severn's personality stored in his ship. Lamia is seven and a half months pregnant with Keats's child, who is named by the Severn personality as "The One Who Teaches."

== Characters ==
- Joseph Severn – the second John Keats AI persona
- The Consul – one of the seven pilgrims, former planetary governor of Hyperion
- Het Masteen – one of the seven pilgrims, Templar priest, captain of the treeship Yggdrasil
- Lenar Hoyt – one of the seven pilgrims, Jesuit priest
- Paul Duré – Jesuit priest and archaeologist, resurrected by a cruciform carried by Lenar Hoyt
- Colonel Fehdmann Kassad – one of the seven pilgrims, colonel of the FORCE
- Martin Silenus – one of the seven pilgrims, poet from Old Earth
- Sol Weintraub – one of the seven pilgrims, Jewish scholar and professor
- Rachel Weintraub – Sol's daughter, was an archeologist before afflicted with Merlin Sickness
- Brawne Lamia – one of the seven pilgrims, private detective
- Johnny – cybrid persona of John Keats, downloaded in a Shrön Loop carried by Lamia
- The Shrike – a mysterious creature of unknown origin and incredible power, apparently moves backwards in time. Also known as the Lord of Pain, the Avatar, or the Angel of Final Atonement.
- Moneta – Kassad's mysterious occasional lover, she is accompanying the Shrike
- Theo Lane – Governor-General of Hyperion
- Melio Arundez – time physician, Rachel's past boyfriend
- Meina Gladstone – senate CEO of the Hegemony of Man
- Leigh Hunt – first aid to the CEO
- Sedeptra Akasi – second aid to the CEO
- General Arthur Morpurgo – commander of FORCE ground troops
- Commander William Ajunta Lee – Navy captain promoted to Admiral
- Admiral Kushwant Singh – admiral of the FORCE
- Admiral Nishita – commander of Hegemony forces in the Hyperion system
- Gabriel Féodor Kolchev – senator of Lusus
- Tyrena Wingreen-Feif – Martin Silenus’ editor
- Hermand Philomel – transport administrator of Sol Draconi Septem
- Diana Philomel – wife of Hermand Philomel
- Councilor Albedo – AI advisor to the Hegemony
- Ummon – AI in the TechnoCore
- Ewdrad B. Tynar – archivist on Renaissance Vector
- Monsignore Édouard – bishop in the catholic church
- Sek Hardeen – high ranking Templar priest, also known as the True Voice of the Worldtree.
- Freeman Ghenga, Coredwell Minmun, Hullcare Amnion – spokesman of their respective ouster clans

== Reception ==
The novel was well-received, with positive reviews from The New York Times and Kirkus Reviews. It won the 1991 BSFA Award for Best Novel and 1991 Locus Award for Best Science Fiction Novel.

It was nominated for the 1991 Hugo Award for Best Novel and the 1991 Nebula Award for Best Novel.
