= Yggdrasil (network) =

Free and open-source decentralized IPv6 network

- Release: 12 March 2019; 7 years ago

Stable release(s)
- 0.5.14 / 2026-10-24
- Written in: Go
- Operating system: Unix-like, (Android, OpenWRT, Illumos, Linux, BSD, macOS, iOS), Microsoft Windows
- Platform: x86, x86_64, MIPS architecture, ARMv7, Aarch64, PowerPC
- Available in: English
- Type: communication protocol, overlay network, mix network, Anonymity application, Decentralized computing
- License: LGPLv3
- Website: yggdrasil-network.github.io
- Repository: github.com/yggdrasil-network/yggdrasil-go

Yggdrasil is a decentralized network protocol with which one can create a mesh network that will work in overlay mode, allowing the user to create a private network on top of the Internet. The purpose of the Yggdrasil network is an attempt to implement the concept of zero-configuration networking- the user does not need to know the routes, they only need to add to the config file the addresses of well-known public peers - everything should work immediately out of the box and should scale.

Moreover, the network can simultaneously work in two modes - over the Internet and without the Internet, connecting physically directly with neighboring devices (via Ethernet, Wi-Fi or Bluetooth) working on the 3-level OSI model.

The data transmitted inside the Yggdrasil network is fully-encrypted, end-to-end asymmetric encryption based on elliptical curves is used, so that the transmitted information is securely protected from other connection members. Additional user anonymization can be done via connection via the respective networks (Tor, I2P).

At the moment there are ready-made builds for Microsoft Windows, Linux, Illumos, macOS, iOS and Android. It is also possible to install on some models of routers, such as OpenWRT.

The Yggdrasil network provides correct operation for applications that support the IPv6 protocol (XMPP, Matrix, Telegram and X, among others).

There are also a large number of internal services and websites, including a large number of internal chats.

Similar to cjdns (which uses fc00:/8), the Yggdrasil network uses deprecated or unallocated IPv6 address space, specifically 200:/7 (allowing for use of all 200: and 300: series IPv6 addresses), without conflicting with standard address allocations.
