= The Rise of Endymion =

1997 science fiction novel by Dan Simmons

- Cover of first edition (hardcover)
- Author: Dan Simmons
- Language: English
- Series: Hyperion Cantos
- Genre: Science fiction
- Publisher: Bantam Books
- Publication date: 1997
- Publication place: United States
- Media type: Print (hardback & paperback)
- Pages: 579
- Awards: Locus Award for Best Science Fiction Novel (1998)
- ISBN: 0-553-10652-X
- OCLC: 36316017
- Dewey Decimal: 813/.54 21
- LC Class: PS3569.I47292 R5 1997
- Preceded by: Endymion

The Rise of Endymion is a 1997 science fiction novel by American writer Dan Simmons. It is the fourth and final novel in his Hyperion Cantos fictional universe. It won the Locus Award for Best Science Fiction Novel, and was nominated for the Hugo Award for Best Novel in 1998.

== Plot ==
=== Premise ===
The Rise of Endymion is set more than 275 years after the fall of the Hegemony of Man, an interstellar organization connected by farcaster portals. At the time of this novel, the Roman Catholic Church has formed the Pax, an administrative entity that formalizes the Church's control and implements a theocracy.

The Church and the Pax have secretly been collaborating with representatives of the TechnoCore. The Core provides the Church with cruciforms, which allow humans to be resurrected and gain functional immortality. However, the TechnoCore fears that Aenea, daughter of a human being and a TechnoCore intelligence, will destroy their hold on 31st-century society.

The world Hyperion has been assimilated into the Pax. However, other worlds resist Pax control, with independence movements springing up on worlds with different religious and philosophical traditions.

=== Summary ===
Raul is still imprisoned and writing his memoirs of his time with Aenea. On Pacem, Lenar Hoyt (now known as Pope Urban XVI) announces a new Crusade against the Ousters. Father de Soya finds the murder of Ouster children unconscionable, and he mutinies.

On Old Earth, Aenea becomes a teacher, instructing others about "the Void which Binds". When she is sixteen, Aenea tells Raul to leave Earth and retrieve the Consul's ship. On God's Grove, three cyborgs retrieve Radamanth Nemes. The four almost catch up with Raul, but they are intercepted by the Shrike. Raul finds the Consul's ship. Travel to the Buddhist planet T'ien Shan creates a 5-year time debt, and Aenea is 21 when she and Raul reunite.

On T'ien Shan, Raul becomes Aenea's lover. Aenea reveals that many people on the planets she has visited have taken communion from her. People who take this communion undergo several changes due to the virus she carries, including gaining the ability to access the Void which Binds and losing the ability to carry a cruciform.

Aenea tells Raul that during their separation, she married someone and had a child; they lived together for two years. Raul is heartbroken. Aenea transfers the Consul's ship away from T'ien Shan through freecasting, using the Void to travel without a portal. They travel to an Ouster Dyson Sphere. There Raul meets Het Masteen and Fedmahn Kassad, two of the Hyperion pilgrims who had died in alternate timelines. Raul learns the truth about the cruciforms. The resurrection uses energy from The Void, causing irreparable damage to the Void. The Core murders humans whenever they need more neural processing power.

Pax troops arrive in the Biosphere, committing genocide on an unprecedented level. Aenea, Raul, many other humans, and the Shrike escape on a treeship captained by Het Masteen. Aenea freecasts to many star systems, dropping off passengers who will continue spreading her communion. The ship is destroyed, and the Shrike returns Masteen to his original timeline.

On Pacem, Aenea confronts Urban; she and Raul are arrested. Raul is placed in the Schrödinger cat box, from which he has been narrating the previous two books. Aenea is tortured by Nemes. Lourdusamy rebels against the Core and burns Aenea to death. Raul completes his memoirs and escapes the cat box by freecasting. At the moment of her death, Aenea's thoughts are broadcast to most of humanity through the Void, creating a widespread rebellion against the Pax and the TechnoCore. Raul travels to Earth, where he meets Aenea. Raul discovers that he is the man with whom Aenea had a child. They will have two years together before she returns to the past. Aenea tells Raul that she has not looked into the future for the coming two years, and that these two years can be an eternity for them.

== Characters ==
- Aenea, often described as a messiah, is a young woman who is the daughter of a human, Brawne Lamia, and an artificial intelligence persona of John Keats. She becomes a teacher and a semi-religious figure. She becomes a martyr and catalyst for the destruction of the Pax.
- Raul Endymion. Previously a nomadic shepherd on Hyperion, he was enlisted into Aenea's service by Martin Silenus. Endymion becomes Aenea's love interest.
- Father Captain Federico de Soya. De Soya is a Pax Fleet officer and Catholic priest who attempted to capture Aenea in the novel Endymion. After saving her life, de Soya was exiled to MadredeDios and stripped of his command, but is called back into service at the beginning of this novel. He mutinies again after witnessing atrocities committed by the Pax Fleet and renounces the cruciform.
- A. Bettik, an android. Born several hundred years before the Fall of the Farcasters in the 29th century, Bettik was a laborer on Hyperion for centuries. He then worked for Martin Silenus. Befriended by Raul, he has accompanied Aenea on their journey. At the conclusion he is revealed to be an observer from an otherwise undescribed advanced alien race that also utilizes The Void Which Binds.

=== Church and Pax figures ===
- Cardinal Simon Augustino Lourdusamy, a prelate and the Vatican's Secretary of State, is the effective head of the Catholic Church and the dominant force behind Pope Urban XVI. Lourdusamy masterminds the search for Aenea and plans the crusade against the Ousters with Urban's approval.
- Father Lenar Hoyt. A central character in Hyperion, Hoyt was one of the last pilgrims to Hyperion and wears both his cruciform and that of Father Paul Duré. Hoyt has served as Pope multiple times after the Fall of the Farcasters, and reigns as Urban XVI at the time of the novel.
- Cardinal John Domenico Mustafa. The Grand Inquisitor of the Holy Office, he is among the most powerful Cardinals and is not a close ally of Lourdusamy's faction. He personally investigates the Shrike's massacres on Mars and is the Church's direct representative throughout the search for Aenea on T'ien Shan. He confronts TechnoCore forces twice during the novel; he is wounded by Nemes the first time and murdered by Albedo the next.
- Kenzo Isozaki is the CEO of the Pax Mercantilus, a Church-recognized super-corporation, and considered to be almost as powerful as Cardinal Lourdusamy. He schemes against the Church leadership throughout the novel and is subsequently relegated to the titular command of an anti-Ouster crusade. At the end of the novel, Isozaki takes control of Pacem, driving out TechnoCore forces, and establishes a provisional democracy on the planet.
- Admiral Marget Wu. The temporary commander of Pax Fleet, Wu plays a supporting role in the novel and is murdered by the Nemes clones on T'ien Shan.
- Rhadamanth Nemes, the Core-created robot who acts as a guard for the Vatican and who hunts Aenea. She has three siblings: Scylla, Gyges, and Briareus.

== Reception and awards ==
The novel's critical reception was moderately positive. The New York Times referred to the entire series as "one of the finest achievements of modern science fiction" and praised the novel's epic scope, worldbuilding, and serious exploration of the relationship between science and religion. Publishers Weekly praised its action sequences, but criticized its overly complex plot and Aenea's unclear explanation of her purpose. Other reviews criticized it for having too much exposition and too little plot, while acknowledging the author's creativity.

The novel won the 1998 Locus Award for Best Science Fiction Novel and was nominated for the 1998 Hugo Award for Best Novel.
