= Hyperion (Simmons novel) =

1989 novel by Dan Simmons

- Paperback cover
- Author: Dan Simmons
- Cover artist: Gary Ruddell
- Language: English
- Series: Hyperion Cantos
- Genre: Soft science fiction, space opera
- Publisher: Doubleday
- Publication date: 1989
- Publication place: United States
- Media type: Print (hardback & paperback)
- Pages: 482 (mass paperback edition)
- Awards: Hugo Award for Best Novel (1990); Locus Award for Best Science Fiction Novel (1990)
- ISBN: 0-385-24949-7 (1st ed. hardcover)
- OCLC: 18816973
- Dewey Decimal: 813/.54 19
- LC Class: PS3569.I47292 H97 1989
- Followed by: The Fall of Hyperion

Hyperion is a 1989 science fiction novel by American author Dan Simmons. The first book of his Hyperion Cantos series, it won the Hugo Award for best novel. The plot of the novel features multiple time-lines and is told from the points of view of many characters. It follows a similar structure to The Canterbury Tales by Geoffrey Chaucer. A framing narrative serves as a means to present the tales of a group of pilgrims sent to Hyperion's Time Tombs, to make a request of the Shrike, a metallic creature that is said to grant a wish to one pilgrim in the group. The story is continued in The Fall of Hyperion, published in 1990.

== Plot ==
=== Background ===
In c. 2732, the Hegemony of Man comprises hundreds of planets connected by farcaster portals. The Hegemony maintains an uneasy alliance with the TechnoCore, a civilization of AIs. Modified humans known as Ousters live in space stations between stars and are engaged in conflict with the Hegemony.

Numerous "Outback" planets have no farcasters and cannot be accessed without incurring significant time dilation. One of these planets is Hyperion, home to structures known as the Time Tombs, which are moving backwards in time and guarded by a legendary creature known as the Shrike. On the eve of an Ouster invasion of Hyperion, a final pilgrimage to the Time Tombs has been organized. The pilgrims decide that they will each tell their tale of how they were chosen for the pilgrimage.

=== The Priest's Tale: "The Man Who Cried God" ===
Paul Duré and Lenar Hoyt are Catholic priests. Father Hoyt tells the story, but prefaces it by reading from Duré's journals. In an earlier archeological dig on a colony world, Duré faked evidence that Christianity had reached that world before humanity did, hoping to spur a resurgence of the church. His ruse was uncovered, and Duré was exiled to Hyperion. He travels to a far part of Hyperion in search of a fabled civilization of isolated humans known as the Bikura. He discovers them and finds that they have an obsession with the "cross" or "cruciform". Thinking that this is the proof he was looking for previously, Duré follows the Bikura to their place of worship, but deduces that the "cross" the Bikura worship are actually cross-shaped parasites, visible underneath the skin, that have infected them. Upon death of the host, the cruciform rebuilds and resurrects the host—though as a copy of their previous body and mind. This has caused severe degradation of both the physical and mental capacities of the hosts after several centuries of being resurrected as a copy of a copy. From this, Duré realizes that the Bikura are actually the survivors of a group that had attempted to settle this remote region of Hyperion centuries earlier, but were thought lost and dead. They are now effectively immortal, though degraded into bald, sexless eunuchs with limited mental capabilities, and they kill any outsiders they deem to be "not of the cross" (i.e., infected with a cruciform), hence why they've never been "discovered".

Seeing the cross necklace Duré is wearing and believing him to be "of the cross", the Bikura accept Duré and lead him to a cave where he encounters the Shrike and is infected with his own cruciform. The cruciforms cause increasing levels of pain to their hosts the farther away the hosts are from their parasites' source. Duré is prevented from either cutting out the cruciform or leaving the Bikura due to the severity of the pain; his journal entries end here, and Hoyt continues with his part of the tale. After contact with Duré is lost, the Church enlists Hoyt to find out what happened. Hoyt follows Duré's trail to the Bikura and discovers that, in order to prevent subsequent resurrections as a host for the cruciform, Duré crucified himself to a tesla tree (a tree on Hyperion that collects electric charge from the air and erupts with lightning constantly) in an attempt to kill himself and the parasite. For seven years, Father Duré had been continually electrocuted and resurrected on the tesla tree. As Hoyt touches Duré, the cruciform falls from his body and allows him finally to die. The Bikura are destroyed with nuclear weapons, but not before Hoyt infects himself with Duré's cruciform.

Father Hoyt's motivation for returning to Hyperion is to be relieved from the constant pain the cruciform parasite inflicts on him for being so far from the colony.

=== The Soldier's Tale: "The War Lovers" ===
Colonel Fedmahn Kassad's tale begins with a flashback to his early life as a gang member and part of the Palestinian diaspora through to his days training in the FORCE military academy on Mars. During a simulation battle, a mysterious woman saves Kassad and becomes his lover. Kassad has repeated encounters with this woman inside these simulated battles, and he spends his days in the academy and after searching for her, as he believes that she is real.

After graduation, Kassad begins a prolific but controversial military career. When the Ousters attack a Hegemony colony world, Kassad uses brutal guerrilla warfare tactics to push them back. He is successful, but a scapegoat in the public's eye for the death and destruction that befell the world. As Kassad is recovering from injuries on his way back to the Web, Ousters attempt to raid the hospital ship that carries him. He hijacks an Ouster shuttle and crashes it onto Hyperion. There he is found by the woman, Moneta, whom he encountered in the simulations. Kassad sees the Tree of Pain, a gigantic steel tree on which the Shrike impales its victims.

Ousters land on the surface of Hyperion in an attempt to capture or kill Kassad. Moneta provides him with armor and weapons, and teaches him to use time-altering abilities in combat. They easily kill the Ousters with unexpected help from the Shrike, whom Moneta seems to trust. While making love after the battle, Kassad realizes that Moneta is working with the Shrike and it has been manipulating him, using him to spark an interstellar war in which billions of people will die. After Kassad is rescued, he becomes an anti-war activist.

This reveals Kassad's motivation for returning to Hyperion: he wishes to kill the Shrike in order to prevent the interstellar war it is planning.

=== The Poet's Tale: "Hyperion Cantos" ===
Martin Silenus was the child of a rich aristocratic family on Earth until a black hole destroyed Earth. Suffering brain damage during a 100 year voyage to a distant world, Silenus loses most of his ability to use language and is forced to work as a laborer. Eventually recovering his ability to speak and write, he starts work on his Hyperion Cantos, which he describes as his magnum opus. Parts of the work are published as a poem, titled the Dying Earth, and along with subsequent books make him a multi-billionaire.

Silenus joins Sad King Billy on Hyperion. Billy is an aristocrat who decides to relocate to Hyperion and establish a kingdom of artists. Silenus resumes work on the Cantos and becomes convinced that the Shrike is his muse. Billy burns the Cantos manuscript and is taken away by the Shrike. In the centuries since, reliant on life-extending treatments, Silenus has been waiting to return to Hyperion to finish the poem.

=== The Scholar's Tale: "The River Lethe's Taste Is Bitter" ===
Sol Weintraub, a Jewish professor, is present on the pilgrimage with his infant daughter Rachel. Twenty years previously, Weintraub's adult daughter had become an archaeologist and had gone to Hyperion. While mapping one of the Tombs, the Shrike appeared; Rachel contracted a disease that causes her to age backwards. Weintraub wrestles for years with dreams in which he is ordered to go to Hyperion and sacrifice Rachel in a replay of the Binding of Isaac. He decides to become a pilgrim and to implore the Shrike for a cure.

After hearing Weintraub's tale, the party retires outside to gaze at the stars. There, they see the Templar treeship which carried them to Hyperion destroyed by Ousters. The ship's captain (who is also on the pilgrimage), Het Masteen, does not react and retires to his room without speaking. In the morning, Masteen is missing and his room is found full of blood, despite a watch that has been kept all night.

=== The Detective's Tale: "The Long Good-Bye" ===
Brawne Lamia (named in reference to Fanny Brawne) is a private investigator. Her current client is a cybrid (a human body controlled by a TechnoCore AI) named Johnny whose personality was designed after John Keats. She and Johnny are forcibly farcast to a planet that seems to be a perfect replica of Old Earth. They become lovers. Lamia and Johnny undertake a virtual reality heist on the TechnoCore. They discover that the Core AIs are divided by their varying loyalty to the Core's Ultimate Intelligence (UI) project. Some members of the Core plan to create an omniscient AI: in essence, a god.

Johnny is killed in an ambush, but not before he transfers his consciousness into an implant in Lamia's skull. It is revealed that Lamia is pregnant with Johnny's baby. She is rescued by Shrike cultists, and granted asylum by the Church of The Shrike under the condition that she will embark on the pilgrimage.

=== The Consul's Tale: "Remembering Siri" ===
The Consul tells the story of Merin Aspic and Siri. Aspic engages in several voyages aboard a spaceship to build a farcaster portal on Maui-Covenant, connecting it to the Hegemony and its waiting hordes of tourists. He meets and falls in love with Siri. Each time they meet, Merin and Siri age at different speeds due to time dilation. As time goes on, Siri becomes a prominent diplomat, but is also forced to be increasingly militant as a freedom fighter against the Hegemony of Man. This is due to their willingness to destroy the planet's natural ecology and culture via the installment of a farcaster, as well as their willful extermination of the planet's demonstrably sentient dolphins.

The difference in their age grows more pronounced until the eighth visit, in which Merin returns to find Siri dead of old age and the farcaster ready to be activated. Merin chooses to sabotage the farcaster, beginning a hopeless resistance against the Hegemony. In crushing the rebellion, the military destroys the ecology as thoroughly as the tourists would have. The Consul reveals that Siri and Merin were his grandparents. He bides his time, waiting for a chance to betray the Hegemony and achieve revenge, all the while participating in several genocides against sentient alien species. The Consul reveals that he triggered an Ouster device which led to the emptying of the Time Tombs and the release of the Shrike, knowing that doing so would likely cause the destruction of humanity.

=== Epilogue ===
The pilgrims decide to continue their journey to meet the Shrike. The narrative abruptly ends as they approach the Time Tombs, which now emit an unusual glow, across the desert plain. The six remaining pilgrims join hands and chant what they describe as an "ancient" rhyme, We're Off to See the Wizard from The Wizard of Oz, while walking to their destination.

== Characters ==
- The Consul is the former planetary governor of Hyperion. He is enigmatic for much of the first novel, observing and recording the stories of the other Shrike Pilgrims but reluctant to share his own. He is one of only a few thousand individuals to own a private starship.
- Lenar Hoyt is a Roman Catholic priest in his early 30s, in a universe in which Catholicism claims only a few million followers.
- Fedmahn Kassad is a Martian colonel in the Hegemony's FORCE military, of Palestinian descent.
- Brawne Lamia is a private detective. Her name derives from a combination of Fanny Brawne, the love of John Keats, and the eponymous creature of his Lamia and Other Poems. Brawne is the daughter of Senator Byron Lamia, once a friend of CEO Meina Gladstone, and he apparently committed suicide when Brawne was a child.
- Martin Silenus is a foul-mouthed poet. Born on Earth before its destruction, he is incredibly old. Like Keats, he is working on an unfinished epic poem.
- Sol Weintraub is a Jewish scholar. His daughter was afflicted with an illness dubbed the "Merlin Sickness" that caused her to age backwards: she gets younger as time progresses.
- Het Masteen is the most mysterious of all seven of the pilgrims. He is a Templar (a nature priest) who captains the treeship that brings the pilgrims to Hyperion.
- The Shrike is a menacing and immensely powerful creature of uncertain origin and motives who appears throughout the narrative. It is known for impaling people on a massive metal tree. It is named after the bird of the same name, which impales insects and small animals on branches. The pilgrims expect to find the Shrike in the Time Tombs, which are the ultimate destination of their journey, but as they tell their individual tales it becomes clear that the creature is already connected to each of them.
- Meina Gladstone is the CEO and Commander in Chief of the Hegemony of Man, residing on Tau Ceti Center.

== Background ==
In the 1970s, Simmons was an elementary school teacher in a small town in Missouri. He began telling stories to his pupils, which eventually grew to become "The Death of a Centaur", a story which would later appear in his collection Prayers to Broken Stones. This was the first story set in the universe of Hyperion.

== Reception ==
Hyperion was well received critically. The New York Times praised its literary references, its format, and its treatment of the Ultimate Intelligences. Other reviews call it a cult classic, praising Simmons's worldbuilding and character development. Some reviewers enjoyed the way that the six central stories weave together to create a cohesive novel, but others have criticized the fact that most of the story takes place during flashbacks, leaving limited room for plot advancement.

== Awards ==
The novel won the 1990 Hugo Award for Best Novel and the 1990 Locus Award for Best Science Fiction Novel. It was nominated for the 1991 BSFA Award for Best Novel. With its sequel The Fall of Hyperion, it was nominated for the 1992 Arthur C. Clarke Award

== Adaptations ==
In 2009, Scott Derrickson was set to direct Hyperion Cantos for Warner Bros. and Graham King, with Trevor Sands penning the script to blend Hyperion and The Fall of Hyperion into one film. In 2011, actor Bradley Cooper expressed interest in taking over the adaptation. On June 10, 2015 it was announced that TV channel Syfy would be producing a mini-series based on the Hyperion Cantos with the involvement of Cooper and King. In November 2021, it was announced that Warner Bros, and Bradley Cooper would instead be developing Hyperion as a film.
