= Hyperion Cantos =

Science fiction novel series by Dan Simmons

Hyperion

The Hyperion Cantos is a series of science fiction novels by Dan Simmons. The title was originally used for the collection of the first pair of books in the series, Hyperion and The Fall of Hyperion, and later came to refer to the overall storyline, including Endymion, The Rise of Endymion, and a number of short stories. More narrowly, inside the fictional storyline, after the first volume, the Hyperion Cantos is an epic poem written by the character Martin Silenus covering in verse form the events of the first two books.

Of the four novels, Hyperion received the Hugo and Locus Awards in 1990; The Fall of Hyperion won the Locus and British Science Fiction Association Awards in 1991; and The Rise of Endymion received the Locus Award in 1998. All four novels were also nominated for various science fiction awards.

== Works ==
=== Hyperion (1989) ===
First published in 1989, Hyperion has the structure of a frame story, similar to Geoffrey Chaucer's Canterbury Tales and Giovanni Boccaccio's Decameron. The story weaves the interlocking tales of a diverse group of travelers sent on a pilgrimage to the Time Tombs on Hyperion. The travelers have been sent by the Hegemony (the government of the human star systems), the All Thing, and the Church of the Final Atonement, alternately known as the Shrike Church, to make a request of the Shrike. As they progress in their journey, each of the pilgrims tells their tale.

=== The Fall of Hyperion (1990) ===
This book concludes the story begun in Hyperion. It abandons the storytelling frame structure of the first novel, and is instead presented primarily as a series of dreams by John Keats.

=== Endymion (1996) ===
The story commences 274 years after the events in the previous novel. Few main characters from the first two books are present in the later two. The main character is Raul Endymion, an ex-soldier who receives a death sentence after an unfair trial. He is rescued by Martin Silenus and asked to perform a series of rather extraordinarily difficult tasks. The main task is to rescue and protect the daughter of Brawne Lamia (one of the main characters of Hyperion), Aenea, a messiah coming from the time period just after the first books via time travel. The Catholic Church has become a dominant force in the human universe and views Aenea as a potential threat to their power. The group of Aenea, Endymion, and A. Bettik (an android) evades the Church's forces on several worlds through use of the Consul's spaceship, ending the story on Earth.

=== The Rise of Endymion (1997) ===
This final novel in the series finishes the story begun in Endymion, expanding on the themes in Endymion, as Raul and Aenea battle the Church and meet their respective destinies.

=== Short stories ===
The series also includes three short stories:

- "Remembering Siri" (1983, included almost verbatim in Hyperion)
- "The Death of the Centaur" (1990)
- "Orphans of the Helix" (1999)

== Development ==
The Hyperion universe originated when Simmons was an elementary school teacher, as an extended tale he told at intervals to his young students; this is recorded in "The Death of the Centaur", and its introduction. It then inspired his short story "Remembering Siri", which eventually became the nucleus around which Hyperion and The Fall of Hyperion formed. After the quartet was published came the short story "Orphans of the Helix". "Orphans" is currently the final work in the Cantos, both chronologically and internally.

The original Hyperion Cantos has been described as a novel published in two volumes, published separately at first for reasons of length. In his introduction to "Orphans of the Helix", Simmons elaborates:

Some readers may know that I've written four novels set in the "Hyperion Universe"—Hyperion, The Fall of Hyperion, Endymion, and The Rise of Endymion. A perceptive subset of those readers—perhaps the majority—know that this so-called epic actually consists of two long and mutually dependent tales, the two Hyperion stories combined and the two Endymion stories combined, broken into four books because of the realities of publishing.

== Influences ==
Much of the appeal of the series stems from its extensive use of references and allusions from a wide array of thinkers such as Teilhard de Chardin, John Muir, Norbert Wiener, and to the poetry of John Keats, the famous 19th-century English Romantic poet, Norse mythology, and the monk Ummon. A large number of technological elements are acknowledged by Simmons to be inspired by elements of Out of Control: The New Biology of Machines, Social Systems, and the Economic World.

The Hyperion series has many echoes of Jack Vance, explicitly acknowledged in one of the later books.

The title of the first novel, "Hyperion", is taken from one of Keats's poems, the unfinished epic Hyperion. Similarly, the title of the third novel is from Keats' poem Endymion. Quotes from actual Keats poems and the fictional Cantos of Martin Silenus are interspersed throughout the novels. Simmons goes so far as to have two artificial reincarnations of John Keats ("cybrids": artificial intelligences in human bodies) play a major role in the series.

== Setting ==
Much of the action in the series takes place on the planet Hyperion. It is described as having one-fifth less gravity than Earth standard. Hyperion has a number of peculiar indigenous flora and fauna, notably Tesla trees, which are essentially large electricity-spewing trees. It is also a "labyrinthine" planet, which means that it is home to ancient subterranean labyrinths of unknown purpose. Most importantly, Hyperion is the location of the Time Tombs, large artifacts surrounded by "anti-entropic" fields that allow them to move backward through time.

In the fictional universe of the Hyperion Cantos, the Hegemony of Man encompasses over 200 planets. Faster than light communications technology, Fatlines, are said to operate through tachyon bursts. However, in later books it is revealed that they operate through the Void Which Binds. The Farcaster network was given to humanity by the TechnoCore and again it was another use of the Void Which Binds that allowed this instantaneous travel between worlds. The Hawking Drive was developed by human scientists, allowing the faster than light travel which led to the Hegira (from the Arabic word هجرة Hijra, meaning 'migration'). The Gideon drive, a Core-provided starship drive, allows for near-instantaneous travel between any two points in human-occupied space. The drive's use kills any human on board a Gideon-propelled starship; thus, the technology is only of use with remote probes or when used in conjunction with the Pax's resurrection technology. The resurrection creche can regenerate someone carrying a cruciform from their remains. Treeships are living trees that are propelled by ergs (spider-like solid-state alien being that emits force fields) through space.

=== The Shrike ===
The region of the Tombs is also the home of the Shrike, a menacing half-mechanical, half-organic four-armed creature that features prominently in the series. It appears in all four Hyperion Cantos books and is an enigma in the initial two; its purpose is not revealed until the second book, but is still left nebulous. The Shrike appears to act both autonomously and as a servant of some unknown force or entity. In the first two Hyperion books, it exists solely in the area around the Time Tombs on the planet Hyperion. Its portrayal is changed significantly in the last two books, Endymion and The Rise of Endymion. In these novels, the Shrike appears effectively unfettered and protects the heroine Aenea against assassins of the opposing TechnoCore.

Surrounded in mystery, the object of fear, hatred, and even worship by members of the Church of the Final Atonement (the Shrike Cult), the Shrike's origins are described as uncertain. It is portrayed as composed of razorwire, thorns, blades, and cutting edges, having fingers like scalpels and long, curved toe blades. It has the ability to control the flow of time, and may thus appear to travel infinitely fast. The Shrike may kill victims in a flash or it may transport them to an eternity of impalement upon an enormous artificial 'Tree of Thorns,' or 'Tree of Pain' in Hyperion's distant future. The Tree of Thorns is described as an unimaginably large, metallic tree, alive with the agonized writhing of countless human victims of all ages and races. It is also hinted in the second book that the Tree of Thorns is actually a simulation generated by a mystical interface which connects to human brains via a strong and pulsing (as if it were alive) cord. The name Shrike seems a reference to birds of the shrike family, a family of birds that impales their victims on thorns, spines, or twigs.

=== Worlds and Systems ===
In the fictional universe of the Hyperion Cantos, the Hegemony of Man encompasses over 200 planets. The following planets appear or are specifically mentioned in the Hyperion Cantos.

Planets of the old neighborhood, the section of space relatively close to the Sol system

- Barnard's World – Located in the Barnard's Star system, Fomalhaut
- Heaven's Gate – Orbiting the star Alpha Lyrae or Vega
- NGCes 2629-4BIV – The only planet in the Wolf 359 system that can support life
- Mare Infinitus – In the novel Endymion it is stated that this world is the moon of a subjovian planet orbiting the star known as 70 Ophiuchi A
- Mars, Moon, Old Earth
- Sibiatu's Bitterness (also known as Inevitable Grace) – Orbiting the star Lacaille 9352
- Tau Ceti Center (TC^{2}) – Orbiting the star Tau Ceti
- Vitus-Gray-Balianus B – A planet 14 light years away from Sol

Worlds of the Hegemony and later Pax

- Acteon, Asquith, Bressia, Castrop-Rauxel, Deneb Drei, Deneb Vier (Two planets of Deneb star system), Earth 2, Esperance, Freeholm, Freude, God's Grove, Grass, Lee III, Lusus, Madre de Dios, Maui-Covenant, Metaxas, Nordholm, Nuevo Madrid, Pacem – The planet is around 90 light years away from the Sol system, Parsimony, Patawpha, Renaissance Minor, Renaissance Vector, Tempe, Thalía, Villefranche-sur-Saône

Worlds of the Hegemony, later mainly independent from Pax

- Fuji, Lambert Ring Territory, Mao Four, Nevermore New Earth, New Harmony, New Mecca, Qom-Riyadh, Tsingtao-Hsishuang Panna

Labyrinth planets

- Armaghast, Hyperion – Home of the Time Tombs and the mysterious Shrike, Svoboda – 3 light-years from the planet Pacem

Independent outback planets and worlds

- Aldebaran – Homeworld of the "Ergs", an alien non-intelligent species that can generate natural force fields
- Amritsar, Garden – A forest world close to Hyperion
- Camn, Groombridge Dyson D, Hebron, Ixion, Madhya, NNGC 4645 Delta – A Outback system, from which, 280 light years away, there is an unnamed jungle planet that is part of Tethys and where Aenea and Raul Endymion began their journey on the river.
- Orbital Forests – Not actually planets, but orbiting forests, having atmospheres kept in by containment fields; eventually these grow into Dyson trees, a biological variant of Dyson Spheres.
- Parvati – The closest planet to Hyperion, only a few dozen light years away
- Sol Draconi Septem, St. Theresa, T'ien Shan, Whirl – A gas giant that was formerly occupied by the Zeplin, a species of semi-intelligent, large, buoyant lifeforms which occupy the thermals between layers of gas.
