= Dan Simmons =

American science fiction and horror writer (1948–2026)

- Simmons in 2002
- Born: Daniel Joseph Simmons; April 4, 1948; Peoria, Illinois, U.S.
- Died: February 21, 2026 (aged 77); Longmont, Colorado, U.S.
- Education: Wabash College (BA); Washington University in St. Louis (MEd)
- Occupation: Novelist
- Spouse: Karen Simmons
- Children: 1
- Writing career
- Period: 1983–2026
- Genres: Science fiction; horror; fantasy
- Notable works: Song of Kali (1985); Hyperion (1989); Carrion Comfort (1989); The Terror (2007)
- Website: Official Web Site at the Wayback Machine (archived February 13, 2016)

Daniel Joseph Simmons (April 4, 1948 – February 21, 2026) was an American science fiction and horror writer. He was the author of the Hyperion Cantos and the Ilium/Olympos cycles, among other works that span the science fiction, horror, and fantasy genres, sometimes within a single novel. Simmons's genre-intermingling Song of Kali (1985) won the World Fantasy Award. He also wrote mysteries and thrillers, some of which feature the continuing character Joe Kurtz.

== Biography ==
Born in Peoria, Illinois, on April 4, 1948, Simmons started writing stories as a child with the goal of mesmerizing his audience with his story telling. Simmons received a B.A. in English from Wabash College in 1970 and, in 1971, a Masters in Education from Washington University in St. Louis.

Simmons soon started writing short stories, although his career did not take off until 1982, when, through Harlan Ellison's help, Simmons was invited to the Milford workshop, which Ellison considered to be "the best SF writing workshop in the world". Simmons considered Ellison as a mentor, friend, and the reason he pursued writing full-time. Simmons's short story "The River Styx Runs Upstream" was published and awarded first prize in a Twilight Zone Magazine story competition, and he was taken on as a client by Ellison's agent, Richard Curtis. Simmons's first novel, Song of Kali, was released in 1985.

He worked in elementary education until 1989.

Simmons died from complications of a stroke in Longmont, Colorado, on February 21, 2026, at the age of 77.

== Horror fiction ==
Summer of Night (1991) recounts the childhood of a group of pre-teens who band together in the 1960s, to defeat a centuries-old evil that terrorizes their hometown of Elm Haven, Illinois. The novel, which was praised by Stephen King in a cover blurb, is similar to King's It (1986) in its focus on small-town life, the corruption of innocence, the return of an ancient evil, and the responsibility for others that emerges with the transition from youth to adulthood.

In the sequel to Summer of Night, A Winter Haunting (2002), Dale Stewart (one of the first book's protagonists and now an adult), revisits his boyhood home to come to grips with mysteries that have disrupted his adult life.

Between the publication of Summer of Night (1991) and A Winter Haunting (2002), several additional characters from Summer of Night appeared in: Children of the Night (1992), a loose sequel to Summer of Night, which features Mike O'Rourke, now much older and a Roman Catholic priest, who is sent on a mission to investigate bizarre events in a European city; Fires of Eden (1994), in which the adult Cordie Cooke appears; and Darwin's Blade (2000), a thriller in which Dale's younger brother, Lawrence Stewart, appears as a minor character.

After Summer of Night, Simmons focused on writing science fiction until the 2007 work of historical fiction and horror, The Terror. His 2009 book Drood is based on the last years of Charles Dickens's life leading up to the writing of The Mystery of Edwin Drood, which Dickens had partially completed at the time of his death.

== Historical fiction ==
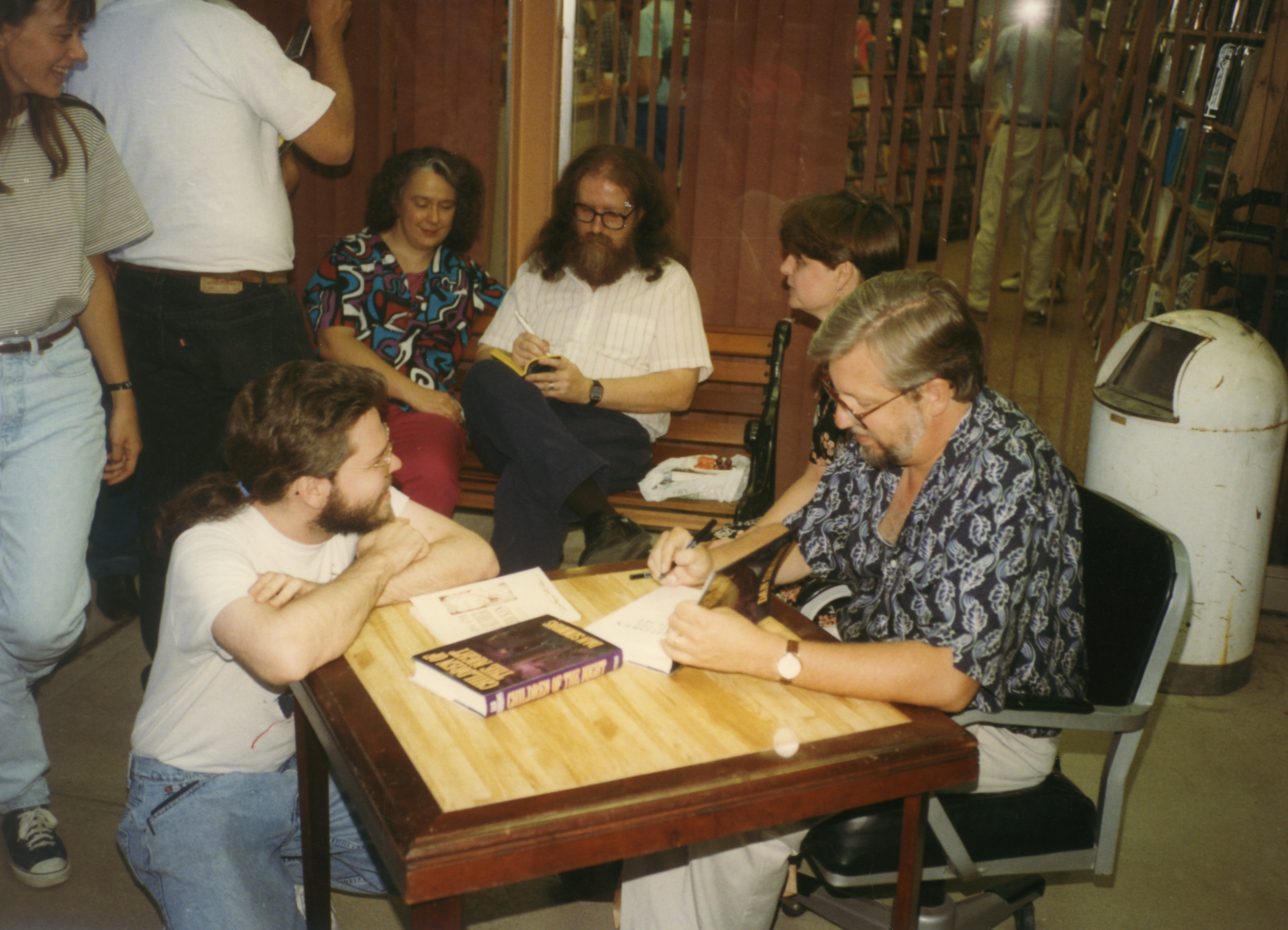
Simmons signing an autograph (1992)

The Terror (2007) crosses the bridge between horror and historical fiction. It is a fictionalized account of Sir John Franklin and his expedition to find the Northwest Passage. The two ships, HMS Erebus and HMS Terror, become icebound the first winter, and the captains and crew struggle to survive while being stalked across an Arctic landscape by a monster. The novel was adapted into a ten-part television series in 2018.

The Abominable (2013) recounts a mid-1920s attempt on Mount Everest by five climbers—two British, one French, one Sherpa, and one American (the narrator)—to recover the body of a cousin of one of the British characters.

== Literary references ==
Many of Simmons's works have strong ties with classic literature. For example:

- His 1989 novel Hyperion, winner of Hugo and Locus Awards for the best science fiction novel, deals with a space war and is inspired in its structure by Boccaccio's Decameron and Chaucer's Canterbury Tales.
- The Hyperion Cantos take their titles from poems by the British Romantic John Keats.
- Ilium/Olympos deals with Homer, Shakespeare, Marcel Proust's À la recherche du temps perdu (In Search of Lost Time) and Vladimir Nabokov's novel Ada or Ardor: A Family Chronicle.
- The title of Carrion Comfort, as well as many of its themes, derives from the poem "Carrion Comfort" by Gerard Manley Hopkins.
- The Hollow Man (1992) is a novel influenced by Dante's Inferno and T. S. Eliot
- "The Great Lover" (1993) is a short story inspired by the World War I War Poets
- Simmons's collection of short stories, Worlds Enough & Time, takes its name from the first line of the poem "To His Coy Mistress" by English poet Andrew Marvell: "Had we but world enough, and time"
- The detective in Flashback is named Nick Bottom after a character in Shakespeare's A Midsummer Night's Dream

== Bibliography ==
=== Novels ===
==== Series ====
===== Hyperion Cantos =====
1. Hyperion (1989) – ISBN 978-0553283686
2. The Fall of Hyperion (1990) – ISBN 978-0553288209
3. Endymion (1996) – ISBN 978-3453315174
4. The Rise of Endymion (1997) – ISBN 978-0747258933

===== Related short fiction =====
- "Remembering Siri" (1983) – (Novelette), predecessor to Hyperion
- "The Death of the Centaur" (1990) – (Novelette)
- "Orphans of the Helix" (1999) – (Novelette), sequel to The Rise of Endymion

===== Seasons of Horror =====
1. Summer of Night (1991) – ISBN 978-0312550677
2. Children of the Night (1992) – ISBN 978-1250009852
3. Fires of Eden (1994) – ISBN 978-0061056147
4. Darwin's Blade (2000) – ISBN 978-0380973699
5. A Winter Haunting (2002) – ISBN 978-0380817160

===== Related =====
- Banished Dreams (1990), collects three prophetic dream sequences that were expurgated from the published edition of Summer of Night, entitled "Dale's Dream", "Kevin's Dream" and "Mike's Dream"

===== Joe Kurtz =====
1. Hardcase (2001) – ISBN 978-0312980160
2. Hard Freeze (2002) – ISBN 978-0316213509
3. Hard as Nails (2003) – ISBN 978-0312994686

===== Ilium/Olympos =====
1. Ilium (2003) – ISBN 978-0380817924
2. Olympos (2005) – ISBN 978-0380817931

==== Standalone ====
- Song of Kali (1985) – ISBN 978-0312944087
- Carrion Comfort (1989), expansion of the eponymous novelette published in Prayers to Broken Stones – ISBN 978-0913165386
- Phases of Gravity (1989) – ISBN 978-0553277647
- The Hollow Man (1992) – ISBN 978-0935716641
- The Crook Factory (1999) – ISBN 978-0380973682
- The Terror (2007) – ISBN 978-0316017442
- Drood (2009) – ISBN 978-0316007023
- Black Hills (2010) – ISBN 978-1849160902
- Flashback (2011) – ISBN 978-0316006965
- The Abominable (2013) – ISBN 978-0751550283
- The Fifth Heart (2015) – ISBN 978-0316198820
- Omega Canyon (Note: Omega Canyon is listed as available on several booksellers websites; however as of February 2026 the book is still unable to be purchased, with no information as to when the book will be available.) (unpublished, original publication date 2025) – ISBN 978-0316198912

=== Short stories ===
==== Collections ====
- Prayers to Broken Stones (1990), six short stories and seven novellas/novelettes:
  "The River Styx Runs Upstream", "Eyes I Dare Not Meet in Dreams" (novelette), "Vanni Fucci Is Alive and Well and Living in Hell", "Vexed to Nightmare by a Rocking Cradle", "Remembering Siri" (novelette of Hyperion Cantos series), "Metastasis", "The Offering" (novelette), "E-Ticket to 'Namland" AKA "E-Ticket to Namland" (novelette), "Iverson's Pits" (novella), "Shave and a Haircut, Two Bites", "The Death of the Centaur" (novelette of Hyperion Cantos series), "Two Minutes Forty-Five Seconds", "Carrion Comfort" (novelette)
- Lovedeath (1993), collection of five novelettes and novellas
  "Entropy's Bed at Midnight" (novelette), "Dying in Bangkok" AKA "Death in Bangkok" (novelette), "Sleeping with Teeth Women" (novella), "Flashback" (novelette), "The Great Lover" (novella)
- Worlds Enough & Time (2002), collection of five novellas/novelettes:
  "Looking for Kelly Dahl" (novella), "Orphans of the Helix" (novelette from Hyperion Cantos series), "The Ninth of Av" (novella), "On K2 with Kanakaredes" (novelette), "The End of Gravity" (novella)

==== Uncollected short fiction ====
- "Presents of Mind" (1986, with Edward Bryant, Steve Rasnic Tem and Connie Willis)
- "Dying Is Easy, Comedy Is Hard" (1990, with Edward Bryant) – (Novelette)
- "The Counselor" (1991) – (Novelette)
- "All Dracula's Children" (1991) – (Novelette)
- "My Private Memoirs of the Hoffer Stigmata Pandemic" (1991)
- "This Year's Class Picture" (1992) (Appeared in The Living Dead, an anthology edited by John Joseph Adams)
- "Elm Haven, IL" (1992) – (Novelette), from Freak Show series
- "One Small Step for Max" (1992)
- "My Copsa Micas" (1994) – (Novelette)
- Madame Bovary, C'est Moi (2000)
- Muse of Fire (2007) – (Novella)
- The Guiding Nose of Ulfänt Banderōz (2009) – (Novella) published as a chapbook and set in Jack Vance's Dying Earth setting
- The Final Pogrom (2024)

=== Non-fiction ===
- Going After the Rubber Chicken (1991), a collection of three convention guest-of-honor speeches by Simmons
- Summer Sketches (1992), Simmons reveals how his travel experiences have allowed him to instill a feeling of place in readers of his fiction
- Negative Spaces: Two talks (1999), about science fiction

== Adaptations ==
In January 2004, it was announced that the screenplay he wrote for his novels Ilium and Olympos would be made into a film by Digital Domain and Barnet Bain Films, with Simmons acting as executive producer. Ilium is described as an "epic tale that spans 5,000 years and sweeps across the entire solar system, including themes and characters from Homer's Iliad and Shakespeare's The Tempest."

In 2008, Guillermo del Toro was scheduled to direct a film adaptation of Drood for Universal Pictures. As of December 2017, the project is still listed as "in development".

In 2009, Scott Derrickson was set to direct Hyperion Cantos for Warner Bros. and Graham King, with Trevor Sands penning a script adapting Hyperion and The Fall of Hyperion into one film. In 2011, actor Bradley Cooper expressed interest in taking over the adaptation. In 2015, it was announced that TV channel Syfy would produce a miniseries based on the Hyperion Cantos with the involvement of Cooper and King. As of May 2017, the project was still "in development" at Syfy. On November 1, 2021, Cooper and King restarted the feature film adaptation at Warner Bros., with Tom Spezialy set to write the script.

The Terror (2007) was adapted in 2018 as the first season (10 episodes) of an AMC miniseries and received generally positive reviews upon release.

== Awards ==
=== Wins ===
| Work | Year & Award | Category | Ref. |
|---|---|---|---|
| Song of Kali | 1986 World Fantasy Award | Novel | |
| Carrion Comfort | 1989 Bram Stoker Award | Novel | |
| Carrion Comfort | 1990 Locus Award | Horror Novel | |
| Carrion Comfort | 1990 British Fantasy Award | August Derleth Award | |
| Hyperion | 1990 Locus Award | SF Novel | |
| Hyperion | 1990 Hugo Award | Novel | |
| Hyperion | 1991 Premio Ignotus | Foreign Novel | |
| Hyperion | 1995 Seiun Award | Translated Long Story | |
| Hyperion | 1998 Tähtivaeltaja Award | | |
| The Fall of Hyperion | 1991 Locus Award | SF Novel | |
| The Fall of Hyperion | 1991 SF Chronicle Award | Novel | |
| The Fall of Hyperion | 1991 BSFA Award | Novel | |
| The Fall of Hyperion | 1996 Seiun Award | Translated Long Work | |
| Entropy's Bed at Midnight | 1991 Locus Award | Novelette | |
| Entropy's Bed at Midnight | 1991 Readercon Awards | Short Work | |
| Prayers to Broken Stones | 1991 Bram Stoker Award | Fiction Collection | |
| Summer of Night | 1992 Locus Award | Horror/Dark Fantasy Novel | |
| All Dracula's Children | 1992 Locus Award | Novelette | |
| This Year's Class Picture | 1992 Bram Stoker Award | Short Fiction | |
| This Year's Class Picture | 1993 World Fantasy Award | Short Fiction | |
| This Year's Class Picture | 1993 Theodore Sturgeon Award | Short Science Fiction | |
| This Year's Class Picture | 1999 Seiun Award | Translated Short Story | |
| This Year's Class Picture | 2009 FantLab's Book of the Year Award | Novella/Short Story | |
| This Year's Class Picture | 2010 Nocte Award (listed as La foto de la clase de este año) | Foreign Short Story | |
| Children of the Night | 1993 Locus Award | Horror/Dark Fantasy Novel | |
| Dying in Bangkok | 1993 Bram Stoker Award | Novelette | |
| Dying in Bangkok | 1994 Locus Award | Novelette | |
| Fires of Eden | 1995 Locus Award | Horror/Dark Fantasy Novel | |
| The Great Lover | 1996 Grand Prix de l'Imaginaire | Foreign Short story/Collection of Foreign Short Stories | |
| The Rise of Endymion | 1998 Locus Award | SF Novel | |
| The Rise of Endymion | 1998 SF Chronicle Award | Novel | |
| The Rise of Endymion | 1999 Prix Zone | Foreign SF Novel | |
| Orphans of the Helix | 2000 Locus Award | Novella | |
| The Crook Factory | 2000 Colorado Book Award | Literary Fiction | |
| A Winter Haunting | 2002 International Horror Guild Award | Novel | |
| A Winter Haunting | 2003 Colorado Book Award | Fiction | |
| Ilium | 2004 Locus Award | SF Novel | |
| Ilium | 2004 SF Site Readers Poll | SF/Fantasy Book | |
| The Terror | 2007 International Horror Guild Award | Novel | |
| The Terror | 2008 FantLab's Book of the Year Award | Novel/Collection | |
| Drood | 2009 Black Quill Awards | Dark Novel Genre of the Year (Readers' Choice) | |
| | 2013 World Horror Convention Grand Master Award | | |

=== Nominations ===
Simmons has been nominated on numerous occasions in a range of categories for his fiction, including the Arthur C. Clarke Award, Bram Stoker Award, British Fantasy Society Award, Hugo Award, Nebula Award, and World Fantasy Award.

| Work | Year & Award | Category | Ref. |
|---|---|---|---|
| The River Styx Runs Upstream | 1983 Locus Award | Short Story | |
| The River Styx Runs Upstream | 2012 FantLab's Book of the Year Award | Translated Novella or Short Story | |
| Remembering Siri | 1984 Locus Award | Novelette | |
| Song of Kali | 1986 Locus Award | First Novel | |
| Metastasis | 1989 World Fantasy Award | Short Fiction | |
| Phases of Gravity | 1990 Locus Award | SF Novel | |
| Phases of Gravity | 1995 Grand Prix de l'Imaginaire | Prix spécial | |
| Prayers To Broken Stones Collection | 1990 Bram Stoker Award | Fiction Collection | |
| Prayers To Broken Stones Collection | 1990 Locus Award | Collection | |
| Prayers To Broken Stones Collection | 1991 World Fantasy Award | Collection | |
| Entropy's Bed at Midnight | 1990 Bram Stoker Award | Long Fiction | |
| Entropy's Bed at Midnight | 2012 FantLab's Book of the Year Award | Translated Novella or Short Story | |
| Hyperion | 1990 BFSA Award | Novel | |
| Hyperion | 1990 SF Chronicle | Novel | |
| Hyperion | 1993 Grand Prix de l'Imaginaire | Foreign Novel | |
| Carrion Comfort | 1990 World Fantasy Award | Novel | |
| The Fall of Hyperion | 1991 Hugo Award | Novel | |
| The Fall of Hyperion | 1991 Nebula Award | Novel | |
| Summer of Night | 1991 Bram Stoker Award | Novel | |
| Summer of Night | 1992 British Fantasy Award | August Derleth Award | |
| Summer of Night | 1993 Kurd Laßwitz Award | Foreign Work | |
| Children of the Night | 1992 Bram Stoker Award | Novel | |
| Lovedeath | 1993 Bram Stoker Award | Fiction Collection | |
| Lovedeath | 1994 Locus Award | Collection | |
| Lovedeath | 1996 Grand Prix de l'Imaginaire | Foreign Novel | |
| The Hollow Man | 1993 Locus Award | SF Novel | |
| The Hollow Man | 1995 Kurd Laßwitz Award | Foreign Work | |
| Flashback | 1993 Bram Stoker Award | Novella | |
| Flashback | 1994 Locus Award | Novella | |
| Flashback | 2011 Goodreads Choice Awards | Science Fiction | |
| Dying in Bangkok | 1994 World Fantasy Award | Short Fiction | |
| Looking for Kelly Dahl | 1996 Locus Award | Novella | |
| Looking for Kelly Dahl | 1998 Grand Prix de l'Imaginaire | Foreign Short story/Collection of Foreign Short Stories | |
| Endymion | 1997 Locus Award | SF Novel | |
| Endymion | 1998 Premio Ignotus | Foreign Novel | |
| Endymion | 1998 Kurd Laßwitz Award | Foreign Work | |
| The Rise of Endymion | 1998 Hugo Award | Novel | |
| The Rise of Endymion | 1999 Premio Ignotus | Foreign Novel | |
| The Rise of Endymion | 2000 Grand Prix de l'Imaginaire | Foreign Novel | |
| The Rise of Endymion | 2000 Kurd Laßwitz Award | Foreign Work | |
| Endymion & The Rise of Endymion | 2000 Seiun Award | Translated Long Work | |
| Madame Bovary, c'est moi | 2001 Locus Award | Short Story | |
| Orphans of the Helix | 2001 Premio Ignotus | Foreign Story | |
| On K2 with Kanakaredes | 2002 Locus Award | Novelette | |
| Worlds Enough & Time | 2003 Locus Award | Collection | |
| Worlds Enough & Time | 2005 Kurd Laßwitz Award | Foreign Work | |
| A Winter Haunting | 2003 Locus Award | Fantasy Novel | |
| Ilium | 2004 Hugo Award | Novel | |
| Ilium | 2005 Premio Ignotus | Foreign Novel | |
| Ilium | 2005 Grand Prix de l'Imaginaire | Foreign Novel | |
| Ilium | 2005 Kurd Laßwitz Award | Foreign Work | |
| Ilium | 2007 Seiun Award | Translated Long Work | |
| Olympos | 2006 Locus Award | SF Novel | |
| Olympos | 2008 Seiun Award | Translated Long Work | |
| The Terror | 2007 Black Quill Award | Dark Genre Novel of the Year | |
| The Terror | 2007 Bram Stoker Award | Novel | |
| The Terror | 2008 Shirley Jackson Award | Novel | |
| The Terror | 2008 British Fantasy Award | August Derleth Award | |
| The Terror | 2009 Premio Ignotus | Foreign Novel | |
| Muse of Fire | 2008 Locus Award | Novella | |
| Drood | 2010 Locus Award | Fantasy Novel | |
| Drood | 2011 FantLab's Book of the Year Award | Translated Novel/Collection | |
| Drood | 2012 Grand Prix de l'Imaginaire | Foreign Novel | |
| The Guiding Nose of Ulfant Banderoz | 2017 Seiun Award | Translated Short Story | |

=== Finalists ===
| Year | Award | Category | Work | Ref. |
|---|---|---|---|---|
| 1992 | Arthur C. Clarke Award | Science Fiction Novel | Hyperion Cantos | |

=== Other ===
| Year | Award | Category | Work | Result | Ref. |
|---|---|---|---|---|---|
| 1999 | SF Site Readers Poll | SF/Fantasy Book | The Rise of Endymion | 6th Place | |
| 2006 | SF Site Readers Poll | SF/Fantasy Book | Olympos | 9th Place | |
| 2008 | SF Site Readers Poll | SF/Fantasy Book | The Terror | 9th Place | |
| 2014 | RUSA CODES Reading List | Historical Fiction | The Abominable | Shortlisted | |
