= Endymion (Simmons novel) =

1996 science fiction novel by Dan Simmons

- Author: Dan Simmons
- Language: English
- Series: Hyperion Cantos
- Genre: Science fiction
- Publisher: Headline Book Publishing
- Publication date: February 1996
- Publication place: United States
- Media type: Print (hardback & paperback)
- Pages: 441 (first edition, hardback)
- ISBN: 0-7472-0525-6 (first edition, hardback)
- OCLC: 60236724
- Preceded by: The Fall of Hyperion
- Followed by: The Rise of Endymion

Endymion is the third science fiction novel by American writer Dan Simmons, first published in 1996. It is also the third book in his Hyperion Cantos fictional universe, centered on the new characters Aenea and Raul Endymion. The novel was shortlisted for the 1997 Locus Award.

== Plot ==
=== Background ===
274 years before the novel opens, Hegemony CEO Meina Gladstone ordered the destruction of all farcaster portals to stop the TechnoCore, which was believed to be located within the farcaster network, from eliminating humankind. This event, known as the Fall, resulted in the collapse of civilization on many planets. Brawne Lamia, pregnant by the first John Keats cybrid (a body genetically identical to a human, but occupied by a computer based personality based in the TechnoCore) gave birth to a daughter called Aenea. Lamia died when Aenea was still young. When Aenea was twelve years old, she entered the Time Tombs and disappeared into the future.

Before the Fall, Father Paul Duré was elected as Pope under the name of Teilhard. When he died unexpectedly, Lenar Hoyt was resurrected from their shared body and elected Pope. The Church claimed to have developed a new technology that enabled resurrection of those who had accepted the attachment of a "cruciform" to their body, becoming virtually immortal. With help of its military forces the Catholic Church filled the void left by the Hegemony after the Fall.

=== Aenea's rescue ===
On Hyperion, a hunting guide named Raul Endymion is given a mission from Martin Silenus: rescue Aenea, who is about to emerge from the Time Tombs; find Old Earth; destroy the Pax; and stop the TechnoCore. Endymion is helped by android A. Bettik and by the Consul's starship.

The Pax, which teaches that Aenea is a dangerous abomination, knows that she is about to arrive from the Time Tombs. Father-Captain Federico de Soya is instructed to capture her. The Shrike and Aenea simultaneously arrive; the Shrike massacres most of the Pax military units. In the confusion, Endymion rescues Aenea.

Father de Soya pursues Aenea in the Archangel-class courier ship Raphael. The ship's new technology allows faster-than-light travel without time debt, at the price of a painful death and resurrection during each trip. Aenea convinces de Soya to allow her ship to land on the planet Renaissance Vector. She flies the ship through an ancient farcaster portal, which has been inactive since the Fall of Hyperion. De Soya attempts to disable Aenea's ship, but is too late to prevent it from farcasting.

=== Traveling through the River Tethys ===
The damaged ship arrives on an unknown planet. Aenea and Raul construct a raft to follow the River Tethys without the ship. De Soya begins an odyssey of continuous deaths and resurrections through all known planetary systems in order to find her.

The next farcaster sends Aenea to the ocean planet Mare Infinitus. They encounter a sea platform occupied by Pax guards. Raul boards the hawking mat and goes alone to the platform, taking some explosives in order to create a distraction. He succeeds, but only after being injured by the Pax and losing the mat. Next, they translate to Hebron. They find the Jewish home planet completely abandoned. De Soya's search brings him to Mare Infinitus, where he finds evidence that Aenea and Endymion have been there. De Soya and his crew are rerouted to Pacem. Cardinal Lourdusamy, the Vatican Secretary of State, assigns Rhadamanth Nemes, part of a new officer corps, to De Soya's guard.

=== Sol Draconi Septem ===
Aenea, Raul and Bettik travel to Sol Draconi Septem, a barely terraformed, frozen, high-gravity planet. They meet and befriend Father Glaucus, an exiled priest, and the Chitchatuk, primitive humans who are adapted to Sol Draconi Septem's conditions. They farcast to Qom Riyadh, an Islamic planet that is now mysteriously uninhabited, and then to God's Grove.

The Pope informs de Soya that Aenea is in Sol Draconi Septem. De Soya translates there, but Nemes does not die during the trip; it is revealed she is not human. Before the other crew members resurrect, she takes a dropship to the planet. She kills the Chitchatuk and Father Glaucus. She also links to the farcaster and learns that Aenea has gone to Qom Riyadh and will soon head for God's Grove. She plants this new destination in the ship's communicator, but de Soya is suspicious. When they farcast to God's Grove, de Soya secretly gives the ship instructions to resurrect the crew in only 6 hours instead of the safer 3 days.

=== God's Grove ===
Believing that she has three days before De Soya is resurrected, Nemes takes the Raphael's dropship and prepares an ambush for Aenea. As they travel through God's Grove, Aenea shares the truth of what happened to Earth. Earth was not moved by the Technocore, but by an unknown power. She suggests that the Technocore is responsible for the disappearance of the people in Hebron and Qom Riyadh and that it is behind the Church's resurgence and search for them.

When Nemes attacks Aenea, the Shrike appears and blocks her attempts. Father de Soya strikes Nemes from space and allows Aenea to escape. He returns to Pacem to discover the truth about Nemes. Aenea's group passes through a farcaster to reach Old Earth, which is now in the Magellanic Cloud. Aenea guides the ship to Fallingwater, Pennsylvania, and then to Taliesin West, where she will study with a cybrid of architect Frank Lloyd Wright until she is ready to fulfill her mission.

== Characters ==
- Raul Endymion: the narrator protagonist of the novel, a hunting guide on Hyperion; his name rhymes with "Paul"
- Aenea: a messiah figure, the young daughter of Brawne Lamia and the cybrid persona of John Keats
- Martin Silenus: a poet from Old Earth, a pilgrim from the Final Shrike Pilgrimage
- A. Bettik: a laborer android from Hyperion
- Father Captain Federico de Soya: captain of the Pax Fleet ship Raphael, Catholic priest
- Sergeant Gregorius, Corporal Bassin Kee and Lancer Rettig: serving in Pax military under captain de Soya
- Simon Augustino Cardinal Lourdusamy: Vatican Secretary of State
- Monsignor Lucas Oddi: factorum, Vatican Undersecretary of State
- Lenar Hoyt: the Pope under the name Julius XIV, a pilgrim from the Final Shrike Pilgrimage
- Admiral William Lee Marusyn: Fleet Admiral in the Pax
- Rhadamanth Nemes: special Pax trooper, agent of the TechnoCore
- The Shrike: a legendary and mysterious powerful being from the future

== Reception and awards ==
The novel received moderately positive reviews. Kirkus Reviews praised its intriguing ideas and characters while criticizing it for an overly detailed and complex plot. Other reviewers enjoyed the detailed worldbuilding and eagerly awaited the sequel.

The novel was shortlisted for the 1997 Locus Award for Best Novel.
