= The Hunter (Stark novel) =

Novel by Richard Stark (pseudonym of Donald E. Westlake)

- First edition
- Author: Richard Stark
- Cover artist: Harry Bennett
- Language: English
- Genre: Thriller
- Publisher: Perma Books
- Publication date: 1962
- Pages: 155

The Hunter is a 1962 crime thriller novel by American writer Donald E. Westlake under the pseudonym Richard Stark. It is the first of the novels featuring career criminal Parker.

== Synopsis ==
Parker—penniless, shabbily dressed—walks across the George Washington Bridge into Manhattan, single-mindedly bent on payback. A quick series of cons and identity theft allows him to acquire a false name, a change of clothes, and a small amount of money. He first tracks down his wife Lynn, unsure if he'll kill her for betraying him during a caper gone sour. She tells him that Mal, one of the caper's participants, now pays her rent. She says that he moved out after becoming frustrated with his inability to rouse her passion the same way Parker did. After telling Parker all she knows, Lynn kills herself with an overdose of sleeping pills.

Staying in Lynn's apartment, Parker meets the courier who brings her rent and extracts the name of his boss, a taxicab dispatcher named Arthur Stegmann. Parker tracks down Stegmann, who says Mal deposits the money for Lynn in a bank account and claims he has no direct contact with Mal nor knowledge of his whereabouts. However, after Parker leaves, Stegmann contacts Mal through an intermediary.

A flashback reveals what led to this: Parker is a professional criminal, specializing in armed robbery. The pattern of his life was to commit a lucrative heist, live well in luxury hotels for a period of months with Lynn, then commit another heist when necessary. This pattern is disrupted when he is convinced, against his better judgment, to join a "crew" in California, planning to rob a shipment of cash intended for an illegal arms deal. The heist goes perfectly until Mal double-crosses the rest of the crew. Because he is too afraid to face Parker directly, Mal convinces Lynn to shoot Parker in bed rather than be killed herself. After killing the other robbers, Mal escapes with the heist proceeds and Lynn, both believing Parker to be dead. However, Parker survives the shooting and is imprisoned for vagrancy. Later, he escapes prison and finds his way to New York City.

Mal is a regional manager for "The Outfit," a nationwide organized crime syndicate; he was "fired" from this position after a blunder in Chicago that cost the Outfit $80,000 and was told to earn it back if he wanted to return to the fold. With the proceeds from the arms heist, Mal bought his way back in, but panics when he hears from Stegmann that Parker is alive and seeking revenge.

Mal approaches Frederick Carter, The Outfit's manager for the New York area, who declines to assist Mal and orders him to take care of the problem himself. Mal takes refuge in a penthouse suite and tells his associates to spread the word of his whereabouts, planning to lay a trap for Parker. However, Parker has already tracked down Mal and corners him in his suite before the trap is ready. Having Mal at his mercy, Parker is unsatisfied, finding it too easy to take his revenge. He decides that what he really wants back is the pattern of his old life, and for that he wants his share from the heist that Mal stole from him. He interrogates Mal for every detail of The Outfit's hierarchy in the city, then strangles him.

Parker approaches Carter in his office, knocks out his bodyguard and demands repayment of his share: $45,000. Carter refuses, not believing that Parker would risk the Outfit's wrath over such a trifling sum. After receiving a final "no" from Carter's immediate superior, Bronson, Parker shoots Carter, then informs Bronson that next he'll be targeting Justin Fairfax, another regional manager.

Parker invades Fairfax's home and knocks out his bodyguards with little effort. To Fairfax, he delivers a different threat: that Parker has a network of freelance professional thieves all over the country, that these thieves have been "casing" the Outfit's operations for years and are only waiting for an excuse to rob them. If Parker is not paid, then he will give the nod to these thieves, and The Outfit will suffer far greater losses than $45,000. Bronson agrees to pay Parker his money but warns that he'll never live to enjoy it. Shortly before going to the money drop, Parker returns to Stegmann's taxi lot and kills him for informing Mal.

The money drop is set at a subway station in Brooklyn. Parker outmaneuvers a group of Outfit thugs sent to kill him and gets his money—only to be questioned at his hotel by police detectives, who have come to the mistaken conclusion that he's involved in drug smuggling and are going to take him in. Parker escapes the detectives but loses the suitcase full of money in the process. Undaunted, he plans and executes a robbery of an Outfit operation with some fellow heisters, telling the employees there to tell Bronson that Parker is collecting interest on the loan. Parker plans to have a change of appearance performed by a plastic surgeon and spend the next few months living well in Florida.

== Development ==
The novel was written as a stand-alone crime novel, but when Westlake turned it in, his editor told him that if he would rewrite the ending so that Parker escaped, he would be willing to publish up to three books a year about Parker. Though Westlake was not able to keep up that level of productivity, he did go on to write 23 more Parker novels over the next 46 years.

The Hunter was re-issued by the University of Chicago Press in August 2008. The first hardcover edition, with illustrations by Darwyn Cooke, appeared from IDW in 2014.

== In other media ==
=== Film ===
It was the basis for three feature films:

- John Boorman's Point Blank (1967), starring Lee Marvin
- Brian Helgeland's Payback (1999), starring Mel Gibson
- Shane Black's Play Dirty (2025), starring Mark Wahlberg

Other appearances of the "Parker" character include:

- Gordon Flemyng's The Split (1968), starring Jim Brown is based on the 1966 novel The Seventh
- John Flynn's The Outfit (1973), starring Robert Duvall is based on the 1963 novel The Outfit
- Taylor Hackford's Parker (2013), starring Jason Statham is based on the 2000 novel Flashfire

=== Comics ===
The book was adapted as a graphic novel by artist Darwyn Cooke in 2009 as Richard Stark's Parker: The Hunter.
