= Why Me? (1990 film) =

1990 film by Gene Quintano

- Original theatrical poster
- Directed by: Gene Quintano
- Written by: Donald E. Westlake; David Koepp
- Based on: Why Me? by Donald E. Westlake
- Produced by: Marjorie Israël; Irwin Yablans
- Starring: Christopher Lambert; Kim Greist; Christopher Lloyd; J. T. Walsh
- Cinematography: Peter Deming
- Edited by: Alan Balsam
- Music by: Phil Marshall
- Production company: Epic Productions
- Distributed by: Triumph Films
- Release date: April 20, 1990
- Running time: 87 minutes
- Country: United States
- Language: English
- Box office: $83,882

Why Me? is a 1990 American caper comedy film directed by Gene Quintano and starring Christopher Lambert, Kim Greist, Christopher Lloyd, and J. T. Walsh. The screenplay is credited to Donald E. Westlake and Leonard Maas Jr. (a pseudonym of David Koepp), and is based on the fifth book in Westlake's series of John Dortmunder novels.

== Plot ==
The Byzantine Fire, a sacred ruby on loan from Turkey to the United States for exhibition, no sooner arrives in Los Angeles than it is stolen by Eastern religious extremists and hidden inside the safe of a local jewelry store. When professional burglar and jewel thief Gus Cardinale (Christopher Lambert) breaks into the store and inadvertently steals the Byzantine Fire, he finds himself being chased around Los Angeles by the LAPD, the entire Los Angeles criminal element (whom the police have been mercilessly harassing to find the thief), two less-than-competent CIA agents, Turkish government agents and a not-too-tightly wrapped female Armenian terrorist. Now Gus, with the help of his wacky partner Bruno (Christopher Lloyd) and his girlfriend June (Kim Greist), must figure out a way to not only return the Byzantine Fire without getting caught but also stay alive long enough to do so and just maybe make a profit out of the whole deal.

== Cast ==
- Christopher Lambert as Gus Cardinale
- Kim Greist as June Daley
- Christopher Lloyd as Bruno Daley
- J. T. Walsh as Chief Inspector Francis Mahoney
- Gregory Millar as Leon
- Wendel Meldrum as Gatou Vardebedian
- Michael J. Pollard as Ralph
- John Hancock as Tiny
- Jack Kehler as Freedly
- Thomas Callaway as Zachary
- René Assa as Bob the Turk

== Release ==
The film premiered in France on January 10, 1990.

The film was released on April 20, 1990, in the United States.

=== Home media ===
Released on VHS in 1990 by RCA/Columbia Pictures Home Video.

Released on DVD in 2015 by Quadrifoglio Production & Management Srl (Italy)
