= Bank shot =

Bank shot may refer to:

== Sports ==
- Bank shot (basketball), type of shot
- Bank shot, a shot in cue sports
- Bank shot, move in air hockey

== Other uses ==
- Bank Shot, a 1974 film
- Bank Shot, a novel in the John Dortmunder series published by Donald E. Westlake
- "Bankshot", a song by Operation Ivy from the 1989 album Energy
