= Alan Grofield =

Character created by Donald E. Westlake

Alan Grofield is a fictional character created by Donald E. Westlake. He is the main protagonist of four of the 28 novels Westlake has written under the pseudonym Richard Stark and a supporting character in an additional four. Grofield's first appearance was in the novel The Score, which was published in 1964.

In the film Play Dirty (2025), the character of Grofield is played by LaKeith Stanfield.

== Character description ==
A career criminal and professional thief, Grofield is a devilishly handsome and charming womanizer whose main passion in life is the stage. This love of theatre does not extend to cinema; Grofield has a deep, almost pathological disdain for television and film acting, which he considers an unacceptable perversion of the actor's craft. Accordingly, even though film and TV roles can be lucrative, Grofield will under no circumstances pursue acting opportunities in these fields.

In his early appearances, Grofield works in summer stock theatres; later in the series, Grofield owns a summer stock company which operates out of a converted barn in (fictional) Mead Grove, Indiana. The primary reason he steals is to establish and keep his money-losing theatre company running, and he might well quit his second profession if he could make a living through his first. Nevertheless, Grofield finds his second profession fulfilling as well.

During the events of The Score, Grofield meets his future wife and acting partner, Mary Deegan, a hostage taken during the heist in that novel, who insists on leaving town with him. She is referenced in the Grofield novels and features prominently in Lemons Never Lie. She helps him run his theater, and serves as his leading lady. Grofield is very happy with her but feels no compunction about being with other women when he's away on a heist.

Unlike his frequent companion Parker, Grofield is a somewhat inconsistent character, and his adventures run the gamut from hard-boiled crime stories (Lemons Never Lie) to more fanciful, James Bond-style globetrotting and intrigue (The Damsel, The Dame, and The Blackbird). Grofield also differs significantly from Parker in that he can be friendly, chatty, and gregarious in all types of company—but, similar to Parker, Grofield does not hesitate to use brutal violence (when necessary) in the furtherance of his goals.

Grofield is not mentioned in any of the eight Parker novels after Butcher's Moon.

== Novels ==
- The Score (1964, aka Killtown), a novel in Westlake's Parker series
- The Handle (1966, aka Run Lethal), a novel in Westlake's Parker series
- The Damsel (1967)
- The Dame (1969)
- The Blackbird (1969) — First chapter shared with Slayground (below)
- Lemons Never Lie (1971)
- Slayground (1971), a novel in Westlake's Parker series. Grofield appears only briefly.
- Butcher's Moon (1974), a novel in Westlake's Parker series

Slayground and The Blackbird both open with a near-identical sequence that describes the exact same failed armored truck robbery, in which Grofield and Parker are both participants. Slayground then goes on to detail Parker's escape from the crime scene, while The Blackbird details Grofield's.

Grofield is mentioned in passing in the Parker novel The Sour Lemon Score but does not appear.

In The Hot Rock (1970), the first of the Dortmunder series (written by Westlake under his real name), the character of Alan Greenwood resembles Grofield and even plans to change his name to "Alan Grofield" after Dortmunder and company break him out of jail (p. 233). This is probably an in-joke: Greenwood is still called Greenwood in the later Dortmunder novel Nobody's Perfect (1977), and is now a successful TV actor. The real Alan Grofield character is described as despising television and as someone who under absolutely no circumstances would even consider accepting a TV acting job.

=== Appearances in graphic novels ===
Grofield appears in Richard Stark's Parker Vol. 2: The Outfit (2010), a comic adaptation by Darwyn Cooke of the third novel in the Parker series. Grofield does not appear in the original novel. He also appears in comic adaptations of The Score and Slayground.

Grofield also appears in Tomorrow and Tomorrow and Tomorrow, an original comic book story written by Ed Brubaker and illustrated by Sean Phillips, which is included as a bonus feature in Darwyn Cooke's Richard Stark's Parker: The Martini Edition — Last Call, collecting Cooke's adaptations of The Score and Slayground in a single volume.

== Bibliography ==
Bibliography from Donald Westlake's Web site.
