= Moving (1988 film) =

1988 film by Alan Metter

- Theatrical release poster by Drew Struzan
- Directed by: Alan Metter
- Written by: Andy Breckman
- Produced by: Stuart Cornfeld
- Starring: Richard Pryor; Beverly Todd; Dave Thomas; Dana Carvey; Randy Quaid
- Cinematography: Donald McAlpine
- Edited by: Alan Balsam
- Music by: Howard Shore
- Production company: Brooksfilms
- Distributed by: Warner Bros.
- Release date: March 4, 1988
- Running time: 89 minutes
- Country: United States
- Language: English
- Box office: $10.8 million

Moving is a 1988 American comedy film starring Richard Pryor as Arlo Pear, a father moving his family cross-country.

Other notable appearances in the film include Randy Quaid as an annoying neighbor, Dana Carvey as a man with multiple personalities hired to drive Pryor's car, Rodney Dangerfield as an embezzling loan officer, musician Morris Day, and WWF wrestler King Kong Bundy as a monstrous mover. The film also stars Stacey Dash as Arlo's daughter Casey, and Leslie Jordan in his film debut.

== Plot ==
Arlo Pear, a transportation engineer living in the New Jersey suburbs, goes to work and meets a new female co-worker. When both of them attempt to enter their keys in the same office doorknob, Arlo guesses what has happened and confronts his boss, Roy Hendersen. His company has merged with another, and now Arlo is out of a job.

Arlo's wife Monica tries to calm her furious husband, saying that she can get him a job at her father's mustard plant. Having become convinced that a job in his own field would better suit him, Arlo refuses. His attempts to find work are futile until he receives a call from another engineering firm, due to Roy's influence. Before hiring him, the firm states that his new job would be in Boise, Idaho. Arlo hesitantly takes the job.

Monica and his daughter Casey become angry after learning the news. Monica eventually calms down and agrees to the move, but Casey is much less willing to concede, sabotaging their attempts to sell their home. Casey relents after offering her parents a solution: she will agree to the move if they let her finish out the school year and graduate at her present school. They agree, the house sells, and they make arrangements for her to stay with family friends.

Monica and Arlo find a suitable house owned by retirees in Boise and agree to buy it, although the retirees jest with the Pears that they are "taking everything with us", when referring to the appliances and fixtures in the house. They hire a moving company, but the moving team is shady, and they decide to go with another company. To their surprise, the same shady movers from the first company arrive, revealing to the Pears that they now work for the second company. They hire the initially squeaky-clean Brad Williams to drive Arlo's black Saab 900 to Boise.

The Pears arrive in Boise to find their new house stripped of not only its cabinetry and appliances, but its doors, stairs and swimming pool, revealing that the sellers were indeed serious when they said that they were "taking everything with us". The movers make an unscheduled stop in New Orleans for Mardi Gras. Brad reveals himself to have multiple personality disorder, and he delivers the Saab in a stripped and wrecked heap. Arlo's job is eliminated on his first day in a highly publicized news conference. To top it off, his new neighbor is revealed to be the twin brother of Frank Crawford, the shell-shocked Vietnam War veteran who lived next door to the family in New Jersey. Like Frank, Cornell Crawford has the same anti-social tendencies as his brother, including mowing his grass with a monstrous contraption powered by a V8 engine.

Arlo snaps. He threatens the sellers of his new home with violence if they do not restore it. He tracks down the moving team on the highway and physically makes short work of them after they arrive at his home. He finds his new boss and manages to save his job. He orders Brad to leave after delivering the Saab.

When Cornell Crawford gets ready to mow his lawn, he is interrupted by Pear, who tells him to put his contraption back in the garage and invest in a "human-sized mower". As Cornell says, "Who's going to make me?", he is answered with ferocious barking from Flipper, the Pears' normally hopelessly lazy dog. Cornell immediately backs off, obviously alarmed, and expresses his admiration for his new neighbors. Arlo replies to his new neighbor by flipping him off, and the surprise arrival of Casey, who was tired of being separated from her family and joined them out West.

== Cast ==
- Richard Pryor as Arlo Pear
- Beverly Todd as Monica Pear, Arlo's wife
- Dave Thomas as Gary Marcus
- Dana Carvey as Brad Williams
- Randy Quaid as Frank and Cornell Crawford, identical twin brothers
- Stacey Dash as Casey Pear, Arlo & Monica's daughter
- Morris Day as Rudy "Something"
- Ji-Tu Cumbuka as Edwards
- King Kong Bundy as Gorgo
- Alan Oppenheimer as Mr. Cadell, a Boise Resident
- Gordon Jump as Simon Eberhard
- Bill Wiley as Arnold Butterworth
- Bibi Osterwald as Crystal Butterworth
- Paul Willson as Mr. Seeger, who buys Arlo's house
- Raphael Harris as Marshall Pear, Arlo & Monica's first son and Randy's identical twin brother
- Ishmael Harris as Randy Pear, Arlo & Monica's second son and Marshall's identical twin brother
- Robert LaSardo as Perry
- Shirley Jo Finney as Jr. High Secretary
- Rodney Dangerfield as Loan Broker (uncredited)
- Leslie Jordan as Customer at Bar
- Rif Hutton as a Reporter
- Richard Collins as a garage sale customer

== Reception ==
=== Box office ===
The film debuted at number 4, and was a failure at box office, grossing US$10,815,378.

=== Critical response ===
The film received mixed reviews. On Rotten Tomatoes, the film has an approval rating of 33%, based on 6 reviews.

A negative review came from the Los Angeles Times, which stated that the film "is pretty flat as a comedy, but is of interest as a case study in sociology, as the Pears could just as easily be white as black. There's a certain irony that a comedy of errors, even a disappointing one, is set against the perfection of an idealized backdrop of a fully and harmoniously racially integrated society." The newspaper also noted that, due to its heavy language, "[the film's] R rating is appropriate".

Janet Maslin of The New York Times provided a positive notice, and stated that "Pryor presides over Moving with Cosbyesque geniality", and that he "does a lot to make [the film] funny".

== Home media ==
The film was released on DVD on August 22, 2006, as part of a double feature, packaged with another Pryor film, Greased Lightning. Both movies are on the same side of a single disc.
