= Joe Gores =

American writer

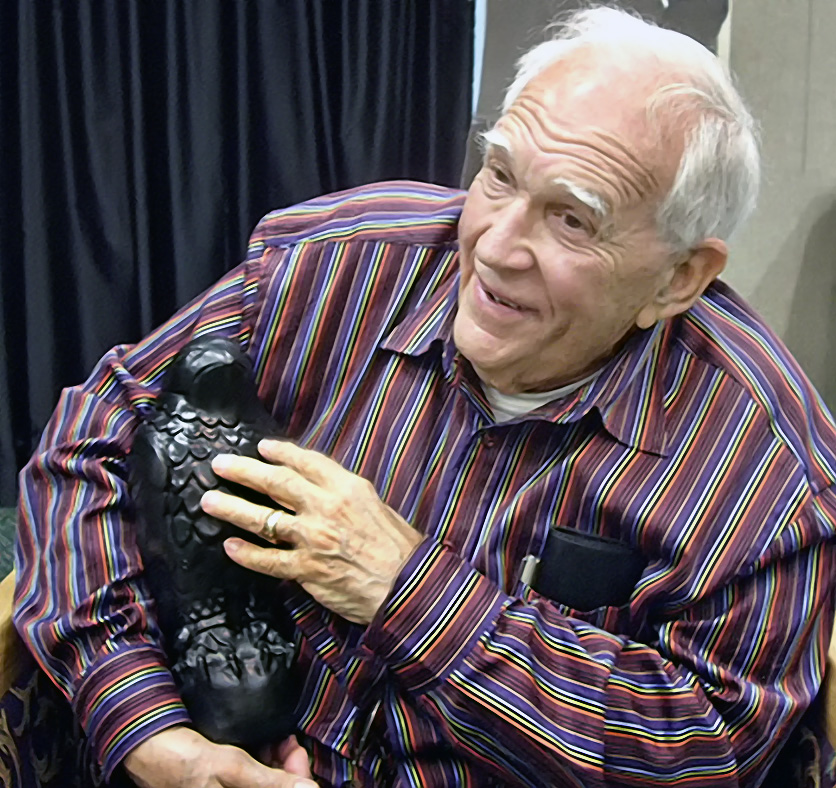
- Born: Joseph Nicholas Gores; December 25, 1931; Rochester, Minnesota, U.S.
- Died: January 10, 2011 (aged 79); Greenbrae, California, U.S.
- Occupation: Mystery writer

Joseph Nicholas Gores (December 25, 1931 – January 10, 2011) was an American mystery writer. He was known best for his novels and short stories set in San Francisco and featuring the fictional Dan Kearney and Associates (the "DKA Files") private investigation firm specializing in repossessing cars, a thinly veiled escalation of his own experiences as a confidential sleuth and repo man. Gores was also recognized for his novels Hammett (1975; made into the 1982 film Hammett), Spade & Archer (the 2009 prequel to Dashiell Hammett's The Maltese Falcon) and his Edgar Award-winning or -nominated works, such as A Time of Predators, 32 Cadillacs and Come Morning.

== Life and career ==
Gores lived in the San Francisco Bay Area and was a longtime resident. He obtained a degree in English literature from Notre Dame University and received a master's degree, also in English literature, from Stanford University in 1961.

Gores worked for 12 years as a private investigator for San Francisco's David Kikkert & Associates, and put in other stints as a truck driver, logger, assistant motel manager and an English teacher at a boys' school in Kenya. In his novels he used variations of the names of former associates—such as Stan Groner. According to The Thrilling Detective Web Site, "He has often relied on his former occupations, particularly his stint as a private eye, to lend an air of authenticity to his work, blasting through the 'glamour' of detective work, [and] showing the drudgery and grunt work of detection."

Gores died in a Marin County, California, hospital 50 years to the day after Dashiell Hammett died.

== Literary career ==
Gores was a three-time Edgar Award winner, and only one of three authors (the other two being Donald E. Westlake and William L. DeAndrea) to receive Edgars in three separate categories; Gores won Best First Novel (for A Time of Predators (1969)—a story set in the San Francisco Bay Area and having to do with a Stanford University professor who re-learns his military commando skills in order to go after a gang of juvenile thugs who raped his wife), Best Short Story ("Goodbye, Pops," Ellery Queen Mystery Magazine, Dec. 1969) and Best TV Series Segment for writing an episode of the crime drama Kojak titled "No Immunity for Murder"—airdate Nov. 23, 1975.

In addition, Gores received the 1986 Maltese Falcon Award, Japan's highest commendation in the mystery fiction field and the Private Eye Writers of America lifetime achievement award (The Eye). He was elected president of the Mystery Writers of America. His novels 32 Cadillacs and Come Morning were nominated for Best Novel Edgars.

Aside from Kojak, Gores wrote teleplays for popular mystery series such as Remington Steele, B.L. Stryker, Mrs. Columbo, and Magnum, P.I.

=== Crossovers ===
Gores and Donald Westlake wrote the same encounter between two of their characters from different perspectives in two different novels. In Chapter 18 of Gores' 1972 novel Dead Skip, San Francisco detective Dan Kearney meets Westlake's amoral thief Parker while looking for one of Parker's associates. The sequence is described from Parker's viewpoint in the 1972 book Plunder Squad, which Westlake wrote under the pseudonym Richard Stark. Gores hints further at the connection between the two books by referring to Parker's associates as "the plunder squad." Additionally, earlier in the novel, the book's protagonist Larry Ballard is described as being a reader only of Richard Stark novels.

Gores and Westlake also wrote a shared chapter in Westlake's Drowned Hopes and Gores' 32 Cadillacs, having the characters in those books influenced by the same event.

== Works ==
Novels:

- A Time of Predators (Edgar Award winner, Best First Novel; 1969)
- Interface (1974)
- Wolf Time (1989)
- Come Morning (Edgar Award nominee, Best Novel; 1986)
- Dead Man (1993)
- Menaced Assassin (1994)
- Cases (1999)
- Glass Tiger (2006)

Hammett novels:

- Hammett (1975)
- Spade & Archer (2009)

DKA novels (involving detective agency Dan Kearney and Associates):

- Dead Skip (DKA; 1972)
- Final Notice (DKA; 1973)
- Gone, No Forwarding (DKA; 1978)
- 32 Cadillacs (DKA; Edgar Award nominee, Best Novel; 1992)
- Contract Null & Void (DKA; 1996)
- Stakeout on Page Street and Other DKA Files (DKA Short Stories; Crippen & Landru, 2000)
- Cons, Scams & Grifts (DKA; 2001)

Short story collections:

- Mostly Murder (Short Stories; 1992)
- Speak of the Devil: 14 Tales of Crimes and Their Punishments (Short Stories; 1999)

Editorial works:

- Honolulu: Port of Call (Editor; 1974)
- Tricks and Treats (Editor with Bill Pronzini; 1976)

Non-fiction:

- Marine Salvage: The Unforgiving Business of No Cure, No Pay (1971)
- Joe Gores Interview (Audio Book; 1987)

=== Selected short stories ===
Gores had written more than 100 short stories by 1993. This is a selection:

EQMM = Ellery Queen Mystery Magazine; DKA = stories involving Dan Kearney and Associates

- "Inscrutable" (2001, The Mysterious Press Anniversary Anthology)
- "Summer Fog" (2001, Flesh and Blood)
- "Ishmael" (1993, New Mystery)
- "Sleep the Big Sleep" (April 1991, EQMM; Danny Durant)
- "Dance of the Dead" (Spring 1991, The Armchair Detective; Neal Fargo)
- "File #12: Do Not Go Gentle" (March 1989, EQMM; DKA)
- "Detectivitis, Anyone?" (January 1988, EQMM; a.k.a. "Plot It Yourself")
- "Smart Guys Don't Snore" (1987, A Matter of Crime #2; Bonecrack Krajewski)
- "File #11: Jump Her Lively, Boys!" (July 1984, EQMM; DKA)
- "File # 9: Full Moon Madness" (February 1984, EQMM; DKA)
- "Rope Enough" (1976, Tricks and Treats)
- "Kirinyga" (March 1975, EQMM)
- "File #8: The O'Bannon Blarney File" (1973, Men and Malice; DKA)
- "Raptor" (October 1983, EQMM)
- "File #10: The Maimed and the Halt" (January 1976, EQMM; DKA)
- "Watch for It" (1973, Mirror, Mirror, Fatal Mirror)
- "The War Club" (May 1972, Argosy)
- "File #7: O Black and Unknown Bard" (April 1972, EQMM; DKA)
- "File #6: Beyond the Shadow" (January 1972, EQMM; DKA)
- "You're Putting Me On—Aren't You?" (1971, Adam's Reader, 1971)
- "Trouble at 81 Fathoms" (June 1971, Argosy)
- "Force 12" (January 1971, Argosy)
- "The Andrech Samples" (September 1970, Swank)
- "The Bear's Paw" (April 1970, Argosy)
- "The Criminal" (1970, Adam 14, No. 12)
- "Goodbye, Pops" (December 1969, EQMM; winner of 1970 Edgar Award for Best Short Story)
- "Quit Screaming" (November 1969, Adam's Reader 41)
- "Gunman in Town" (October 1969, Zane Grey's Western Magazine)
- "File #5: The Maria Navarro Case" (June 1969, EQMM; a.k.a. "Be Nice To Me;" DKA)
- "South of the Moon" (January 1969, Argosy)
- "File #4: Lincoln Sedan Deadline" (September 1968, EQMM; DKA)
- "File #3: The Pedretti Case" (July 1968, EQMM; a.k.a. "The Three Halves;" DKA)
- "The Golden Tiki" (June 1968, Argosy)
- "Olmurani" (February 1968, Argosy)
- "File #2: Stakeout on Page Street" (January 1968, EQMM; DKA)
- "File # 1: The Mayfield Case" (December 1967, EQMM; a.k.a. "Find the Girl;" DKA)
- "Odendahl" (December 1967, Argosy)
- "The Second Coming" (August 1966, Adam's Best Fiction)
- "Kanaka" (1966, Adam 10, No. 11)
- "The Seeker of Ultimates" (November 1965, EQMM)
- "A Sad and Bloody Hour" (April 1965, EQMM) reprinted in Mike Ashley, ed., Historical Whodunits, Barnes & Noble, Inc. 1997, p. 243
- "My Buddy" (1965)
- "Sweet Vengeance" (July 1964, Manhunt)
- "The Price of Lust" (April 1963, Manhunt)
- "Darl I Luv U" (February 1963, EQMM)
- "Trouble in Papeete" (April 1962, Rake)
- "The Main Chance" (April 1962, Gent)
- "Muscle Beach" (March 1962, Rogue)
- "The Mob" (December 1961, Negro Digest)
- "Night Out" (October 1961, Manhunt)
- "Sailor's Girl" (August 1961, Manhunt)
- "You Aren't Yellow" (January 1960, Mike Shayne's Mystery Magazine)
- "Down and Out" (June 1959, Manhunt)
- "Killer Man" (June 1958, Manhunt; a.k.a. "Pro")
- "Chain Gang" (December 1957, Manhunt)

== Selected screenplays ==
- B.L. Stryker: "Blind Chess" (Airdate: Mar. 27, 1989)
- T.J. Hooker: "Death Trip" (Airdate: May 14, 1986)
- Magnum, P.I.: "A Pretty Good Dancing Chicken" (Airdate Apr. 4, 1985)
- Remington Steele: "Let's Steele a Plot" (Airdate Dec. 18, 1984)
- Kate Loves a Mystery (a.k.a. Mrs. Columbo): "Love, on Instant Replay" (Airdate: Oct. 18 1979)
- Kojak: "Case without a File" (Airdate: Dec. 17 1977)
- Kojak: "Bad Dude" (Airdate: Jan. 25, 1976)
- Kojak: "No Immunity for Murder" (Airdate: Nov. 23, 1975; Edgar Award winner, Best Episode in a TV Series)

== Audio drama ==
The German audio-drama producer Ohrenkneifer released "South of Market" on CD in August 2014. It was a full-cast audio drama version of the short story, in German.
