= Made in U.S.A. (1966 film) =

- Theatrical release poster
- Directed by: Jean-Luc Godard
- Screenplay by: Jean-Luc Godard
- Based on: The Jugger (1965) by Donald E. Westlake; The Big Sleep (1946) by William Faulkner, Leigh Brackett, & Jules Furthman
- Produced by: Georges de Beauregard
- Starring: Anna Karina; Marianne Faithfull; Jean-Pierre Léaud
- Cinematography: Raoul Coutard
- Edited by: Agnès Guillemot; Françoise Collin
- Music by: Robert Schumann; Ludwig van Beethoven
- Production companies: Rome Paris Films; Anouchka Films; S.E.P.I.C.
- Distributed by: Lux Compagnie Cinématographique de France
- Release dates: 3 December 1966 (London Film Festival); 27 January 1967 (France)
- Running time: 85 minutes
- Country: France
- Language: French
- Budget: $50,000
- Box office: $95,209

Made in U.S.A is a 1966 French crime comedy film written and directed by Jean-Luc Godard, and starring Anna Karina, László Szabó, Jean-Pierre Léaud, Marianne Faithfull, Yves Afonso, and Jean-Claude Bouillon. It was a loose and unauthorized adaptation of the 1965 novel The Jugger by Richard Stark (an alias of Donald E. Westlake), and was also inspired by the 1946 Howard Hawks film The Big Sleep (which was, in turn, an adaptation of the 1939 novel of the same name by Raymond Chandler).

Because neither Godard nor the producer got permission or paid for the rights to adapt The Jugger, Westlake brought legal action, and the film was not released in the United States for over four decades. A newly restored print of the film was distributed by Rialto Pictures in 2009, starting with a screening at the Castro Theatre in San Francisco on April 1, which was three months after Westlake's death. The Criterion Collection released the film on DVD in July 2009.

== Plot ==
In 1968, journalist Paula Nelson goes to Atlantic-Cité to meet her ex-boyfriend, Richard P[olitzer], who wrote communist magazine editorials, only to discover he has died, supposedly of a heart attack. Edgar Typhus, a former associate, bursts into her hotel room and offers to help Paula look into Richard's death, but, instead, she knocks him out and drags him to his neighboring room, where she meets his nephew, the writer David Goodis, and David's girlfriend, Doris Mizoguchi.

Paula begins to investigate on her own, and finds herself being followed by Paul Widmark, the local police inspector, and Donald Siegel. She begins to suspect Richard's death may have something to do with the death of Lacroix, the communist mayor of Atlantic-Cité, the year before.

An anonymous call summons Paula to a warehouse where someone knocks her out. She wakes up in a garage with Widmark, who asks if she knows where Richard kept some evidence relating to Lacroix's death and plays her some audio tapes of Richard espousing his communist political views.

When Widmark takes Paula back to her hotel, they find it abuzz with police, and learn that Typhus and Doris have been killed, and Inspector Aldrich has come from Paris to investigate. Widmark tells Paula that Aldrich suspects her, but he will help her if she helps him find the evidence he is looking for, though she does not trust him, as she suspects he killed Richard. Aldrich interrogates Paula, but lets her go after David, who initially says she is the murderer, changes his story.

Continuing her investigation, Paula learns that Richard owned a secret villa. Siegel, having been cast aside by Widmark, shows her pictures of Richard's murder, reveals he killed Typhus and Doris because they caught him searching her room, and offers to take her to the villa in exchange for money, but Paula shoots him instead.

Aldrich tells Paula he has received orders to suspend his investigation and goes back to Paris. Paula, having figured out that an extremist wing within the local Communist Party arranged for Richard to kill Lacroix so they could blame the more moderate leftists as part of a power grab, and then killed Richard to tie up loose ends, meets with Widmark and takes him to Richard's villa. As a way for them to protect themselves from a double-cross and be able to trust each other, Paula suggests she write a letter confessing to murdering Typhus, and Widmark write a letter confessing to murdering Richard. Once she gets Widmark's letter, which, as it also implicates the powerful Dr. Edward Ludwig, will protect her from being killed, Paula reaches in her pocket for a gun. Widmark stops her and is about to shoot her, when David sneaks up and shoots Widmark from behind, killing him. Paula then kills David.

Standing at a tollbooth on a highway, Paula sees her friend Philippe Labro drive by, and she gets into his car. He says he does not think there will be a fascist uprising, but she replies that there will be, and she hopes she will have the energy to fight back. Philippe says the political left and right are the same, and new terms should be invented, and Paula asks how the issue should be discussed.

== Cast ==
- Anna Karina as Paula Nelson
- László Szabó as Paul Widmark, a police inspector in Atlantic-Cité
- Jean-Pierre Léaud as Donald Siegel, Widmark's sidekick
- Marianne Faithfull as the singing customer in the bar
- Yves Afonso as David Goodis, a writer

Uncredited

- Danielle Palmero as the hotel chambermaid
- Ernest Menzer as Edgar Typhus, David's uncle
- Kyôko Kosaka as Doris Mizoguchi, David's girlfriend
- Marc Dudicourt as Paul, the barman
- Rémo Forlani as Thomas, the worker in the bar
- Claude Bakka as the man with Marianne Faithfull
- Alexis Poliakoff as Dr. Ludwig's lackey
- Roger Scipion as Dr. Edward Ludwig
- Jean-Claude Bouillon as Inspector Aldrich, from Paris
- Jean-Pierre Biesse as Richard Nixon, a police officer in Atlantic-Cité
- Sylvain Godet as Robert MacNamara, a police officer in Atlantic-Cité
- Rita Maiden as the woman who tells Paula where Richard's villa is located
- Philippe Labro as himself, a journalist

Jean-Luc Godard provided the voice of Paula's ex-boyfriend, Richard P[olitzer], on the tapes Widmark shows her.

== Production ==
Made in U.S.A was shot at the same time as Two or Three Things I Know About Her. Godard put the film together quickly as a way to try to help his friend and producer Georges de Beauregard through financial difficulties stemming from the censorship of Jacques Rivette's film The Nun (1966), which de Beauregard also produced.

The film is the last feature-length project on which Godard and Karina collaborated. The last time they worked together was when he directed her in the segment "Anticipation, ou l'amour en l'an 2000" (Anticipation, or Love in the Year 2000) for the 1967 anthology film The Oldest Profession.

Most of the characters in the film are named after real-life personages, among them actor Richard Widmark; hard-boiled crime writer David Goodis author of Dark Passage; directors Don Siegel, Kenji Mizoguchi, Edward Ludwig, and Robert Aldrich; and American political figures Robert McNamara and Richard Nixon. It has been suggested that the character of Paula Nelson is named after Baby Face Nelson, about whom Siegel had made a film starring Mickey Rooney in 1957. The film is dedicated to "Nick and Sam", referring to Nicholas Ray and Samuel Fuller, "Hollywood mavericks who were objects of filial awe and Oedipal aggression" for Godard. In the bar, Marianne Faithfull sings the song "As Tears Go By", which, in reality, had been a hit for her in 1964.

== Reception ==
Before its release in 2009, Made in U.S.A had "rarely been seen in the U.S.A." Following its screening at the 1967 New York Film Festival, The New York Times called it an "often bewildering potpourri of film narration, imagery and message" and said that "Anna Karina, as the questing girl friend, supplies not only a luminous beauty but also a unifying thread of humanity." Over forty years later, after a showing at Film Forum, A.O. Scott wrote that, while the film is "far from a lost masterpiece, it is nonetheless a bright and jagged piece of the jigsaw puzzle of Mr. Godard’s career", and suggested a number of "reasons for non-Godardians" to see it:

There is, for one thing, a pouting and lovely Marianne Faithfull singing an a capella version of "As Tears Go By". There are skinny young men smoking and arguing. There are the bright Pop colors of modernity juxtaposed with the weathered, handsome ordinariness of Old France, all of it beautifully photographed by Raoul Coutard. There are political speeches delivered via squawk box. And of course there is a maddening, liberating indifference to conventions of narrative coherence, psychological verisimilitude or emotional accessibility.

On review aggregator website Rotten Tomatoes, the film has an approval rating of 85% based on 20 reviews, with an average score of 7.6/10.
