= Donald E. Westlake =

American novelist (1933–2008)

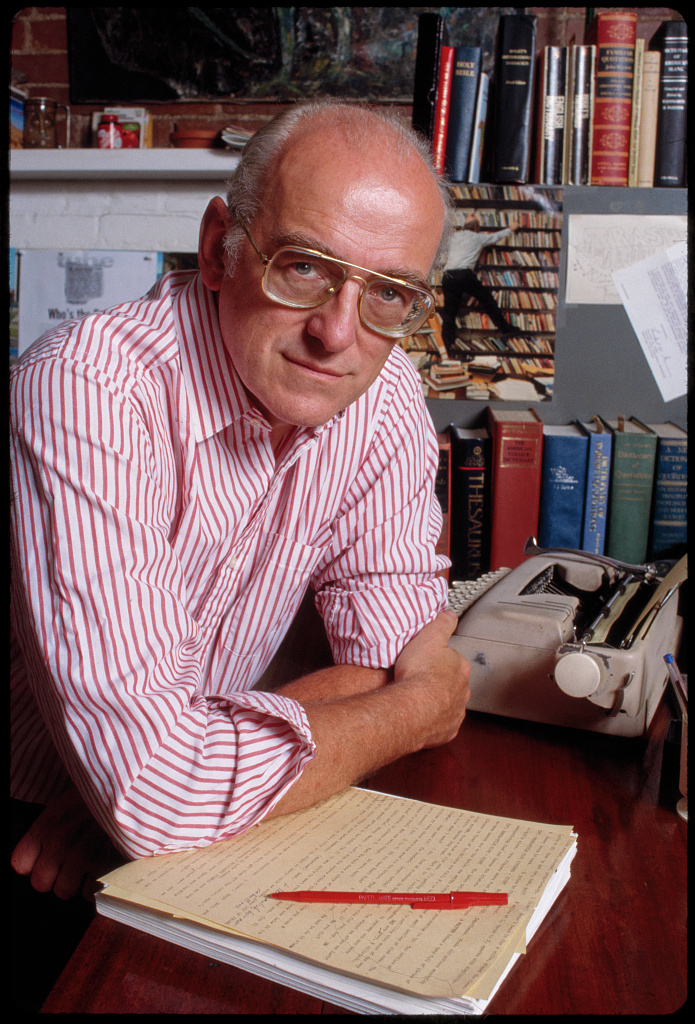
- Westlake at home in the 1980s
- Born: Donald Edwin Westlake; July 12, 1933; New York City, U.S.
- Died: December 31, 2008 (aged 75); Mexico
- Education: Binghamton University
- Occupation: Novelist
- Writing career
- Pen name: John B. Allan, Judson Jack Carmichael, Curt Clark, Timothy J. Culver, J. Morgan Cunningham, Richard Stark, Edwin West, among others
- Genre: Crime fiction
- Notable works: Parker series, John Dortmunder series, God Save the Mark, screenplay for The Grifters
- Notable awards: Edgar Awards for Best Novel (1968), Best Short Story (1990) and Best Motion Picture Screenplay (1991); Mystery Writers of America Grand Master (1993)

Signature
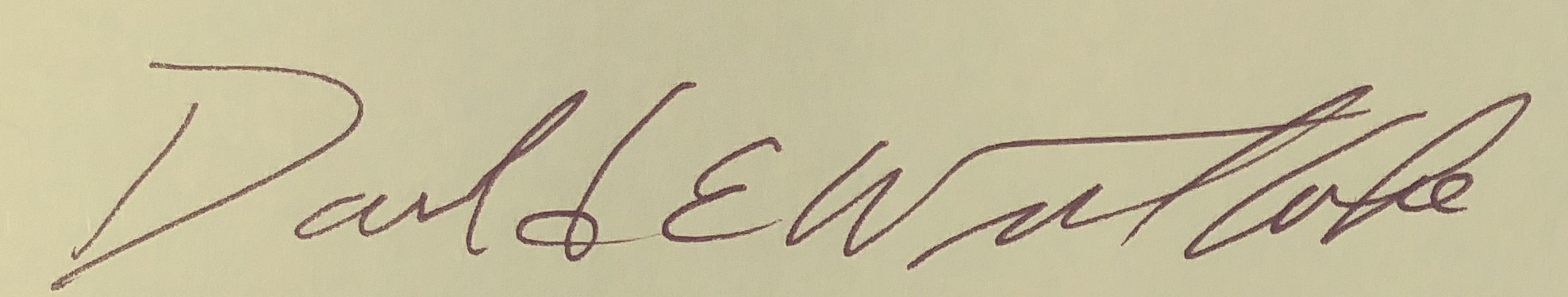

Donald Edwin Westlake (July 12, 1933 – December 31, 2008) was an American writer with more than one hundred novels and non-fiction books to his credit. He specialized in crime fiction, especially comic capers, with an occasional foray into science fiction and other genres. Westlake created two professional criminal characters who each starred in a long-running series: the relentless, hardboiled Parker (published under the pen name Richard Stark), and John Dortmunder, who featured in a more humorous series.

Westlake was a three-time Edgar Award winner and, alongside Joe Gores and William L. DeAndrea, was one of few writers to win Edgars in three different categories (1968, Best Novel, God Save the Mark; 1990, Best Short Story, "Too Many Crooks"; 1991, Best Motion Picture Screenplay, The Grifters). In 1993, the Mystery Writers of America named Westlake a Grand Master, the highest honor bestowed by the society.

== Early life ==
Westlake was born in Brooklyn, New York, the son of Lillian (Bounds) and Albert Joseph Westlake, and was raised in Albany, New York.

== Career ==
Westlake wrote constantly in his teens, and after 200 rejections, his first short story sale was in 1954. Sporadic short story sales followed over the next few years, while Westlake attended Champlain College (a now defunct college created in the post WWII G.I. Bill boom) of Plattsburgh, New York, and Binghamton University in Binghamton, New York. He also spent two years in the United States Air Force.

Westlake moved to New York City in 1959, initially to work for a literary agency while writing on the side. By 1960, he was writing full-time. His first novel under his own name, The Mercenaries, was published in 1960; over the next 48 years, Westlake published a variety of novels and short stories under his own name and a number of pseudonyms.

Westlake was an occasional contributor to science fiction fanzines such as Xero, and in 1962 used Xero as a venue for a harsh announcement that he was leaving the science fiction field.

=== Writing style ===
Donald Westlake was known for the great ingenuity of his plots and the audacity of his gimmicks. Westlake's most famous characters include the hard-boiled criminal Parker (appearing in fiction published under the Richard Stark pseudonym) and Parker's comic flip-side John Dortmunder. Westlake was quoted as saying that he originally intended what became The Hot Rock to be a straightforward Parker novel, but "It kept turning funny," and thus became the first John Dortmunder novel.

Most of Donald Westlake's novels are set in New York City. In each of the Dortmunder novels, there is typically a foray into a particular city neighborhood. He wrote just two non-fiction books: Under an English Heaven, regarding the unlikely 1967 Anguillan "revolution", and a biography of Elizabeth Taylor.

=== Pseudonyms ===
In addition to writing consistently under his own name, Westlake published under several pseudonyms. In the order they debuted:

- Rolfe Passer: An early Westlake story was published under this name in Mystery Digest in 1958. Rolfe Passer was actually the assistant editor of the magazine at the time. It is not known why the story was published under Passer's name; frequent Westlake collaborator Lawrence Block has suggested "editorial incompetence".
- Richard Stark: Westlake's best-known continuing pseudonym was that of Richard Stark. The Stark pseudonym was notable both for the sheer amount of writing credited to it (far more than any other except Westlake's real name itself), as well as for Stark's particular style of writing, which was colder, darker, less sentimental, and less overtly humorous than Westlake's usual prose. For a period in the late 1960s, the popularity of the Parker series made Stark's name more well-known and more lucrative for Westlake than his real name. According to Westlake, he chose the name "Richard Stark" for actor Richard Widmark, whose performance in the film Kiss of Death impressed Westlake: "part of the character's fascination and danger is his unpredictability. He's fast and mean, and that's what I wanted the writing to be: crisp and lean, no fat, trimmed down ... stark." Westlake described the difference between Stark's style and his usual style in a 2001 article for the New York Times Book Review: "Stark and Westlake use language very differently. To some extent they're mirror images. Westlake is allusive, indirect, referential, a bit rococo. Stark strips his sentences down to the necessary information." Stark debuted in 1959, with a story in Mystery Digest. Four other Stark short stories followed through 1961, including "The Curious Facts Preceding My Execution", later the title story in Westlake's first short-story collection. Then, from 1962 to 1974, sixteen novels about the relentless and remorseless professional thief Parker and his accomplices (including larcenous actor Alan Grofield) appeared and were credited to Richard Stark. After Butcher's Moon in 1974, Westlake unexpectedly found himself unable to tap into what he called Stark's "personality." Despite repeated attempts to bring him back, Westlake was unsatisfied. Years later, when Westlake had been hired to write the screenplay for The Grifters, director Stephen Frears was so impressed by its lean, cold attitude that he insisted that the screenplay had been written by Stark, not Westlake, and even tried to get Stark's name officially credited as the writer. Westlake said that "I got out of that one by explaining Richard Stark wasn't a member of the Writer's Guild. I don't think he's a joiner, actually." Stark was inactive until 1997, when Westlake once again began writing and publishing Parker novels under Stark's name beginning with Comeback. The University of Chicago began republishing the Richard Stark novels in 2008.
- Alan Marshall (or Alan Marsh): Westlake acknowledged writing as many as 28 paperback soft-porn titles from 1959 to 1964 under these names; titles include All My Lovers, Man Hungry, All About Annette, Sally, Virgin's Summer, Call Me Sinner, Off Limits, and three featuring the character of Phil Crawford: Apprentice Virgin, All the Girls Were Willing, and Sin Prowl. Westlake was not the only author to work under Marshall's name, claiming: "The publishers would either pay more for the names they already knew or would only buy from (those) names…so it became common practice for several of us to loan our names to friends…. Before…the end of 1961…six other people, friends of mine, published books as Alan Marshall, with my permission but without the publishers' knowledge." Two novels published in 1960 by Midwood Books were co-authored by Westlake and Lawrence Block (who used the pen-name "Sheldon Lord") and were credited to "Sheldon Lord and Alan Marshall": A Girl Called Honey, dedicated to Westlake and Block, and So Willing, dedicated to "Nedra and Loretta", who were (at that time) Westlake and Block's wives.
- James Blue: one-shot pseudonym, used as a third name circa 1959 when both Westlake and Stark already had stories in a magazine issue. In actuality, the name of Westlake's cat.
- Ben Christopher: one-shot pseudonym for a 1960 story in 77 Sunset Strip magazine, based on the characters from the TV show of the same name.
- John Dexter: a house pseudonym used by Nightstand Books for the work of numerous authors. The very first novel credited to John Dexter is a soft-core work by Westlake called No Longer A Virgin (1960)
- Andrew Shaw: pseudonym used by Westlake and Lawrence Block for their 1961 collaborative soft-core novel Sin Hellcat. Like John Dexter (above), "Andrew Shaw" was a house pseudonym used by a wide variety of authors.
- Edwin West: Brother and Sister, Campus Doll, Young and Innocent, all 1961; Strange Affair, 1962; Campus Lovers, 1963, one 1966 short story.
- John B. Allan: Elizabeth Taylor: A Fascinating Story of America's Most Talented Actress and the World's Most Beautiful Woman, 1961, biography.
- Don Holliday: pseudonym used by Westlake for two collaborative soft-core novels (with various authors, including Hal Dresner and Lawrence Block) in 1963/64.
- Curt Clark: debuted in 1964 with the short story "Nackles". Novel: Anarchaos, 1967, science fiction.
- Barbara Wilson: one co-authored novel with Laurence Janifer (The Pleasures We Know, 1964); Janifer also used this name for at least one solo novel with no involvement from Westlake.
- Tucker Coe: five mystery novels featuring the character of Mitch Tobin: Kinds of Love, Kinds of Death, 1966; Murder Among Children, 1967; Wax Apple and A Jade in Aries, both 1970; Don't Lie to Me, 1972.
- P. N. Castor: pseudonym used for one 1966 short story co-authored with Dave Foley.
- Timothy J. Culver: Ex Officio, 1970, thriller.
- J. Morgan Cunningham: Comfort Station, 1971, humor. Cover features the blurb: "I wish I had written this book! – Donald E. Westlake."
- Samuel Holt: four mystery novels featuring the character of Sam Holt, 1986–1989: One of Us is Wrong and I Know a Trick Worth Two of That, both 1986; What I Tell You Three Times is False, 1987; The Fourth Dimension is Death, 1989. Westlake used the Holt pseudonym as an experiment to see if he could succeed as an author under a new name; he was dismayed when his publisher revealed the true identity of "Holt" simultaneously with the release of the first book. Westlake subsequently delivered all four books he had contracted for as Holt, but abandoned plans to write at least two further books in the series.
- Judson Jack Carmichael: The Scared Stiff, 2002, mystery; UK editions dropped the pseudonym.

Westlake sometimes made playful use of his pseudonyms in his work:

- John Dortmunder and associates plan a kidnapping based on a mythical Richard Stark/Parker novel in Westlake's Jimmy The Kid. Stark himself makes an appearance in the novel.
- Richard Stark's character of Parker has ID that gives his name as "John B. Allan".
- In the film version of The Grifters (for which Westlake wrote the screenplay), a key scene takes place at the firm of Stark, Coe and Fellows. Westlake explains the in-joke in the film's DVD commentary track, noting that he wrote books as "Richard Stark, Tucker Coe and some other fellows". Westlake had been asked to write the script for The Grifters using the pen-name "Richard Stark" as an in-joke, but insisted on using his own name.
- A character in Timothy J. Culver's Ex Officio works for Coe-Stark Associates.
- In the Mitch Tobin novel A Jade in Aries, Tobin phones a friend, who briefly mistakes Tobin for somebody named Don Stark.

Additionally, Westlake conducted a mock "interview" with Richard Stark, Tucker Coe and Timothy J. Culver in an article for the non-fiction book Murder Ink: The Mystery Reader's Companion.

=== Literary crossovers ===
Westlake and Joe Gores wrote the same encounter between two of their characters from different perspectives in two different novels. In chapter 18 of Gores' 1972 novel Dead Skip, San Francisco detective Dan Kearney meets Westlake's amoral thief Parker while looking for one of Parker's associates. The sequence is described from Parker's viewpoint in the 1972 book Plunder Squad, which Westlake wrote under the pseudonym Richard Stark. Gores hints further at the connection between the two books by referring to Parker's associates as "the plunder squad". Additionally, earlier in the novel, the book's protagonist Larry Ballard is described as being a reader only of Richard Stark novels.

Gores and Westlake also wrote a shared chapter in Westlake's Drowned Hopes and Gores' 32 Cadillacs, having the characters in those books influenced by the same event.

=== Film and television ===
Several of Westlake's novels have been made into motion pictures: 1967's Point Blank (based on The Hunter) with Lee Marvin as Parker (changed to Walker); Mise à sac (based on The Score) with Michel Constantin as Parker (changed to Georges), also in 1967; 1968's The Split (from the book The Seventh) with Jim Brown as Parker (changed to McClain); The Hot Rock in 1972 with Robert Redford as Dortmunder; Cops and Robbers in 1973; The Outfit with Robert Duvall as Parker (changed to Macklin), also in 1973; Bank Shot in 1974 with George C. Scott as Dortmunder (changed to Ballantine); The Busy Body (with an "all-star cast") in 1967; Slayground with Peter Coyote as Parker (changed to Stone) in 1983; Why Me? with Christopher Lambert as Dortmunder (changed to Cardinale), Christopher Lloyd, and J. T. Walsh in 1990; Payback in 1999, the second film made from The Hunter, with Mel Gibson as Parker (changed to Porter); What's the Worst That Could Happen? in 2001 with Martin Lawrence as Dortmunder (changed to Kevin Caffery); Constantin Costa-Gavras adapted The Ax for the European screen in 2005, to great critical and public acclaim – entitled Le Couperet, the film takes place in France and Belgium rather than the novel's setting of New England; Parker in 2013, based on Flashfire, with Jason Statham as Parker.

In his introduction to one of the short stories in Thieves' Dozen, Westlake mentioned legal troubles with Hollywood over his continued use of the Dortmunder novel characters; the movie studios attempted to assert that he had sold the rights to the characters to them permanently as a result of the Redford film.

The novel Jimmy the Kid has been adapted three times: in Italy as Come ti rapisco il pupo in 1976; in the U.S. as Jimmy the Kid in 1982, starring Gary Coleman; and in Germany as Jimmy the Kid in 1998, starring Herbert Knaup.

The novel Two Much! has been adapted twice: in France as Le Jumeau (The Twin) in 1984; and in the U.S. as Two Much in 1995, starring Antonio Banderas and Melanie Griffith.

Jean-Luc Godard's Made in U.S.A. in 1966 was an extremely loose adaptation of The Jugger. Neither the film's producer nor Godard purchased the rights to the novel, so Westlake successfully sued to prevent the film's commercial distribution in the United States.

Westlake was himself a screenwriter. His script for the 1990 film The Grifters, adapted from the novel by Jim Thompson, was nominated for an Academy Award. Westlake adapted Jim Thompson's work in a straightforward manner, but Westlake the humourist played on Thompson's name later that year in the Dortmunder novel Drowned Hopes by featuring a character named "Tom Jimson" who is a criminal psychopath. Westlake also wrote the screenplay for the film The Stepfather (from a story by Westlake, Brian Garfield and Carolyn Lefcourt), which was popular enough to inspire two sequels and a remake, projects in which Westlake was not involved.

In 1987, Westlake wrote the teleplay Fatal Confession, a pilot for the TV series Father Dowling Mysteries based on the novels by Ralph McInerny. He also appeared in a small role (as the mystery writer Rich Vincent) in the third-season episode, "The Hardboiled Mystery."

Westlake wrote an early draft of the 1999 James Bond film The World Is Not Enough, which was later scrapped because of difficulties in filming in the script's original setting in China. Westlake adapted the script into the novel Forever and a Death, which was published posthumously in 2017 by Hard Case Crime.

Westlake wrote an unproduced screenplay adapting the Dashiell Hammett crime novel Red Harvest, which changed the story considerably to refocus the ending on solving the original murder for which the detective had been hired, which is solved relatively early in the original book and which Westlake felt made the detective's continuing involvement in the story hard to justify.

Westlake co-wrote the story for the pilot of the ill-fated 1979 TV series Supertrain with teleplay writer Earl W. Wallace; Westlake and Wallace shared "created by" credit.

In 2022, Variety reported that Robert Downey, Jr. and Shane Black were working together on multiple movie and television projects for Amazon Studios based on the Parker series. An original Parker story was released by Amazon in 2025 as Play Dirty, directed by Shane Black and starring Mark Wahlberg as Parker.

In 2025, South Korean director Park Chan-Wook filmed Westlake's novel The Ax under the title No Other Choice. The film was favorably reviewed.

His novel Memory, published posthumously in 2010, was adapted into the film The Actor, directed by Duke Johnson, starring André Holland and Gemma Chan, and released in 2025.

== Personal life ==
Westlake was married three times, the final time to Abigail Westlake (also known as Abby Adams Westlake and Abby Adams), a writer of nonfiction (her two published books are An Uncommon Scold and The Gardener's Gripe Book). The couple moved from New York City to Ancram in upstate New York in 1990.

== Death ==
Westlake died of a heart attack on December 31, 2008, while on the way to a New Year's Eve dinner in Mexico, where he and his wife were on vacation.

== Legacy ==
Westlake has been acknowledged by many writers and fans of crime fiction as one of the masters of the genre.

The central villain of Stephen King's 1989 novel The Dark Half, George Stark, was named in honor of Richard Stark. King telephoned Westlake personally to ask permission. King's own "Richard Bachman" pseudonym was also partly named for Stark: King had been reading a Richard Stark novel at the time he chose the pen name.

Writer Duane Swierczynski named his first-born son Parker, in honor of the Richard Stark character as well as Spider-Man's secret identity, Peter Parker.

In addition to Darwyn Cooke's graphic-novel adaptations of Parker, Cooke also homaged Westlake in his earlier work Catwoman: Selena's Big Score by giving one of the characters, an old flame and mentor of Selina Kyle, the name "Stark" as well as the face of Lee Marvin, who played the Parker character in Point Blank.

== Works ==
=== Novels ===
The following table can be sorted to show Westlake's novels in chronological order, or arranged alphabetically by title, publisher, author credit, or series.

Year	Title	Publisher	Author Credit	Series	Notes
1959	All My Lovers	Midwood Books	Alan Marshall		
1959	Backstage Love	Midwood Books	Alan Marshall	Phil Crawford	Also published as Apprentice Virgin
1959	Man Hungry	Midwood Books	Alan Marshall		
1959	Sally	Midwood Books	Alan Marshall		
1960	All About Annette	Midwood Books	Alan Marshall		
1960	All the Girls Were Willing	Midwood Books	Alan Marshall	Phil Crawford	Later printed as What Girls Will Do
1960	A Girl Called Honey	Midwood Books	Alan Marshall & Sheldon Lord		A collaboration between Westlake and Lawrence Block
1960	The Mercenaries	Random House	Donald E. Westlake		Also published in the UK as The Smashers. Republished in 2009 under Westlake's preferred title, The Cutie.
1960	So Willing	Midwood Books	Alan Marshall & Sheldon Lord		A collaboration between Westlake and Lawrence Block
1960	Virgin's Summer	Midwood Books	Alan Marshall		
1960	The Wife Next Door	Midwood Books	Alan Marshall		
1961	Call Me Sinner	Nightstand Books	Alan Marshall		
1961	Passion's Plaything	Bedside Books	Alan Marshall		
1961	Off Limits	Bedside Books	Alan Marshall		
1961	Brother and Sister	Monarch Books	Edwin West		
1961	Campus Doll	Monarch Books	Edwin West		
1960	Young and Innocent	Monarch Books	Edwin West		
1961	Killing Time	Random House	Donald E. Westlake		Later published by Blackbird Books as The Operator in 2023.
1962	The Hunter	Pocket Books	Richard Stark	Parker	Later published as Point Blank and Payback. First appearance of master thief Parker.
1962	361	Random House	Donald E. Westlake		
1962	Strange Affair	Monarch Books	Edwin West		
1963	Killy	Random House	Donald E. Westlake		
1963	Sin Prowl	Corinth Publications	Alan Marshall	Phil Crawford	
1963	Campus Lovers	Monarch Books	Edwin West		
1963	The Man with the Getaway Face	Pocket Books	Richard Stark	Parker	Also published in the UK as Steel Hit.
1963	The Outfit	Pocket Books	Richard Stark	Parker	
1963	The Mourner	Pocket Books	Richard Stark	Parker	
1963	The Score	Pocket Books	Richard Stark	Parker	Also published in the UK as Killtown.
1964	Pity Him Afterwards	Random House	Donald E. Westlake		
1965	The Fugitive Pigeon	Random House	Donald E. Westlake		
1965	The Jugger	Pocket Books	Richard Stark	Parker	
1966	The Seventh	Pocket Books	Richard Stark	Parker	Later published as The Split.
1966	The Busy Body	Random House	Donald E. Westlake		
1966	The Handle	Pocket Books	Richard Stark	Parker	Also published in the UK as Run Lethal.
1966	The Spy in the Ointment	Random House	Donald E. Westlake		
1966	Kinds of Love, Kinds of Death	Random House	Tucker Coe	Mitchell Tobin	
1967	Murder Among Children	Random House	Tucker Coe	Mitchell Tobin	
1967	The Damsel	Macmillan Publishers	Richard Stark	Grofield	
1967	The Rare Coin Score	Fawcett Books	Richard Stark	Parker	
1967	God Save the Mark	Random House	Donald E. Westlake		Edgar Award winner for Best Novel
1967	Philip	Thomas Y. Crowell Co.	Donald E. Westlake		
1967	Anarchaos	Ace Books	Curt Clark		
1967	The Green Eagle Score	Fawcett Books	Richard Stark	Parker	
1968	Who Stole Sassi Manoon?	Random House	Donald E. Westlake		
1968	The Black Ice Score	Fawcett Books	Richard Stark	Parker	
1969	The Sour Lemon Score	Fawcett Books	Richard Stark	Parker	
1969	Somebody Owes Me Money	Random House	Donald E. Westlake		
1969	Up Your Banners	Lancer Books	Donald E. Westlake		
1969	The Dame	Macmillan Publishers	Richard Stark	Grofield	
1969	The Blackbird	Macmillan Publishers	Richard Stark	Grofield	
1970	Wax Apple	Random House	Tucker Coe	Mitchell Tobin	
1970	The Hot Rock	Simon & Schuster	Donald E. Westlake	Dortmunder	Originally planned as a non-comic Parker novel; introduces John Dortmunder
1970	Ex Officio	M. Evans	Timothy J. Culver		Also published under the title Power Play.
1970	Adios Scheherazade	Simon & Schuster	Donald E. Westlake		Builds on Westlake's experiences writing soft-core porn.
1970	A Jade in Aries	Random House	Tucker Coe	Mitchell Tobin	
1971	Lemons Never Lie	World Publishing Company	Richard Stark	Grofield	
1971	I Gave at the Office	Simon & Schuster	Donald E. Westlake		
1971	Deadly Edge	Random House	Richard Stark	Parker	
1971	Slayground	Random House	Richard Stark	Parker	
1972	Bank Shot	Simon & Schuster	Donald E. Westlake	Dortmunder	
1972	Cops and Robbers	M. Evans	Donald E. Westlake		
1972	Don't Lie to Me	Random House	Tucker Coe	Mitchell Tobin	
1972	Plunder Squad	Random House	Richard Stark	Parker	Crosses over with the 1972 Joe Gores novel Dead Skip
1973	Comfort Station	Signet Books	J. Morgan Cunningham		
1973	Gangway!	M. Evans	Donald E. Westlake and Brian Garfield		
1974	Butcher's Moon	Random House	Richard Stark	Parker	
1974	Help, I Am Being Held Prisoner	M. Evans	Donald E. Westlake		
1974	Jimmy the Kid	M. Evans	Donald E. Westlake	Dortmunder	Includes chapters from an otherwise non-existent novel by Richard Stark entitled Child Heist.
1975	Two Much	M. Evans	Donald E. Westlake		
1975	Brothers Keepers	M. Evans	Donald E. Westlake		
1976	Dancing Aztecs	M. Evans	Donald E. Westlake		A shortened version, lacking one of the sub-plots, was published in 1976 as A New York Dance
1977	Nobody's Perfect	M. Evans	Donald E. Westlake	Dortmunder	
1980	Castle in the Air	M. Evans	Donald E. Westlake		
1981	Kahawa	Viking Press	Donald E. Westlake		
1983	Why Me?	Viking Press	Donald E. Westlake	Dortmunder	
1984	A Likely Story	Penzler Books	Donald E. Westlake		
1985	High Adventure	Mysterious Press	Donald E. Westlake		
1985	Good Behavior	Mysterious Press	Donald E. Westlake	Dortmunder	
1986	One of Us Is Wrong	Tor Books	Samuel Holt	Sam Holt	
1986	I Know a Trick Worth Two of That	Tor Books	Samuel Holt	Sam Holt	
1987	What I Tell You Three Times Is False	Tom Doherty Associates	Samuel Holt	Sam Holt	
1988	Trust Me on This	Mysterious Press	Donald E. Westlake	Sara Joslyn	
1989	Sacred Monster	Mysterious Press	Donald E. Westlake		
1989	The Fourth Dimension Is Death	Tom Doherty Associates	Samuel Holt	Sam Holt	
1990	Drowned Hopes	Mysterious Press	Donald E. Westlake	Dortmunder	Crosses over with the 1992 Joe Gores novel 32 Cadillacs
1991	The Perfect Murder: Five Great Mystery Writers Create the Perfect Crime	HarperCollins	Jack Hitt with Lawrence Block, Sarah Caudwell, Tony Hillerman, Peter Lovesey, Donald E. Westlake		Collaborative novel, devised and edited by Hitt. Westlake contributes two chapters.
1992	Humans	Mysterious Press	Donald E. Westlake		
1993	Don't Ask	Mysterious Press	Donald E. Westlake	Dortmunder	
1994	Baby, Would I Lie?	Mysterious Press	Donald E. Westlake	Sara Joslyn	
1995	Smoke	Mysterious Press	Donald E. Westlake		
1996	What's the Worst That Could Happen?	Mysterious Press	Donald E. Westlake	Dortmunder	
1997	The Ax	Mysterious Press	Donald E. Westlake		
1997	Comeback	Mysterious Press	Richard Stark	Parker	
1998	Backflash	Mysterious Press	Richard Stark	Parker	
2000	The Hook	Warner Books	Donald E. Westlake		Published in the UK as Corkscrew
2000	Flashfire	Mysterious Press	Richard Stark	Parker	Also published as Parker, movie tie-in
2001	Firebreak	Warner Books	Richard Stark	Parker	
2001	Bad News	Warner Books	Donald E. Westlake	Dortmunder	
2002	Put a Lid on It	Warner Books	Donald E. Westlake		
2002	Breakout	Mysterious Press	Richard Stark	Parker	
2002	The Scared Stiff	Carroll & Graf Publishers	Judson Jack Carmichael		Published in the UK as by Donald E. Westlake
2003	Money for Nothing	Mysterious Press	Donald E. Westlake		
2004	The Road to Ruin	Mysterious Press	Donald E. Westlake	Dortmunder	
2004	Nobody Runs Forever	Mysterious Press	Richard Stark	Parker	
2005	Watch Your Back!	Mysterious Press	Donald E. Westlake	Dortmunder	
2006	Ask the Parrot	Mysterious Press	Richard Stark	Parker	
2007	What's So Funny?	Warner Books	Donald E. Westlake	Dortmunder	
2008	Dirty Money	Grand Central Publishing	Richard Stark	Parker	
2009	Get Real	Grand Central Publishing	Donald E. Westlake	Dortmunder	
2010	Memory	Hard Case Crime	Donald E. Westlake		Written in the early 1960s, published posthumously.
2012	The Comedy Is Finished	Hard Case Crime	Donald E. Westlake		Written in the early 1980s, published posthumously.
2017	Forever and a Death	Hard Case Crime	Donald E. Westlake		Written in 1998, published posthumously.
2022	Call Me a Cab	Hard Case Crime	Donald E. Westlake		Written c. 1977/78, previously only published in a significantly shorter version in Redbook in 1978.

=== Collections ===
- The Curious Facts Preceding My Execution (1968)
- Enough ("A Travesty" & "Ordo") (1977) - reissued as Double Feature by Hard Case Crime in 2020
- Levine (1984)
- Tomorrow's Crimes (1989), includes the novel Anarchaos
- Horse Laugh and Other Stories (1991)
- The Parker Omnibus, Volume 1 (1997), published in UK, containing The Man with the Getaway Face, The Outfit, and The Deadly Edge.
- The Parker Omnibus, Volume 2 (1999), published in UK, containing The Split (alternate name for The Seventh), The Score, and The Handle.
- A Good Story and Other Stories (1999)
- Thieves' Dozen (2004), a collection of ten Dortmunder short stories and one related story.
- Transgressions (2005), Ed McBain-edited collection of 10 novellas, including Westlake's Dortmunder novella "Walking Around Money"

=== Non-fiction ===
- Elizabeth Taylor: A Fascinating Story of America's Most Talented Actress and the World's Most Beautiful Woman (1961, as "John B. Allan")
- Under an English Heaven (1972)
- The Getaway Car: A Donald Westlake Nonfiction Miscellany (2014) ISBN 9780226121819

=== Produced screenplays ===
- Cops and Robbers (1973)
- Hot Stuff (1979) co-written with Michael Kane
- The Stepfather (1987)
- Why Me? (1990) – based on Westlake's novel, co-written with Leonard Maas, Jr. (pseudonym of David Koepp)
- The Grifters (1990) – based on the novel by Jim Thompson
- Ripley Under Ground (2005) – based on the novel by Patricia Highsmith, co-written with William Blake Herron

=== Unpublished/unproduced works ===
- The Score (1965–1967) – screenplay based on Westlake's Richard Stark novel (later adapted as Alain Cavalier's Mise à sac)
- Murder at the Vanities (1990–1991) – mystery stage musical; libretto by Westlake, music and lyrics by Donald Oliver & David Spencer
- God's Pocket (1996–1997) – screenplay based on the Pete Dexter novel (later adapted as God's Pocket)
- Maximum Bob – screenplay based on the Elmore Leonard novel (later adapted as a TV series, Maximum Bob)
- Arms of Nemesis – screenplay based on the novel by Steven Saylor
- Absolute Faith – original screenplay co-written with Ghasem Ebrahimian
- Red Harvest – screenplay based on the novel by Dashiell Hammett
