= Parker (Stark novels character) =

Fictional criminal created by Richard Stark

- First appearance: The Hunter
- Last appearance: Dirty Money
- Created by: Donald E. Westlake (as Richard Stark)
- Portrayed by: Anna Karina (Made in USA, as Paula Nelson); Lee Marvin (Point Blank, as Walker); Michel Constantin (Pillaged, as Georges); Jim Brown (The Split, as McClain); Robert Duvall (The Outfit, as Earl Macklin); Peter Coyote (Slayground, as Stone); Mel Gibson (Payback, as Porter); Jason Statham (Parker); Mark Wahlberg (Play Dirty)

In-universe information
- Gender: Male
- Occupation: Criminal

Parker is a fictional character created by American novelist Donald E. Westlake. Parker is the main protagonist of 24 of the 28 novels Westlake wrote under the pseudonym Richard Stark. A professional robber, he specializes in large-scale, high-profit crimes.

== Writing style ==
Westlake wrote under many pseudonyms as well as his own name, but the Richard Stark pseudonym was notable both for the sheer amount of writing credited to it (far more than any other except Westlake's real name itself), as well as for Stark's particular style of writing, which was colder, darker, less sentimental, and less overtly humorous than Westlake's usual prose. For a period in the late 1960s, the Stark name was more well-known and more lucrative for Westlake than his real name. According to Westlake, he chose the name "Richard Stark" for actor Richard Widmark, whose performance in the film Kiss of Death impressed Westlake: "part of the character's fascination and danger is his unpredictability. He's fast and mean, and that's what I wanted the writing to be: crisp and lean, no fat, trimmed down ... stark." Westlake described the difference between Stark's style and his usual style in a 2001 article for The New York Times Book Review: "Stark and Westlake use language very differently. To some extent they're mirror images. Westlake is allusive, indirect, referential, a bit rococo. Stark strips his sentences down to the necessary information."

== Overview ==
In a 1981 introduction to a reprint of The Mourner (1963), Westlake's friend and fellow crime novelist Lawrence Block describes Parker as rare among anti-hero protagonists in that the character never develops a conscience. Block argues that novelists are generally "uncomfortable writing consistently from an antisocial perspective", and tend to soften such characters, a fate Parker avoids: "[Parker] never turns honest, or finds God, or starts working as a secret agent for the government." According to Block, a sign of Westlake's genius and the key factor in the character's durability, was the realization that "[a] mellow Parker is no Parker at all." Albert Frederick Nussbaum, a bank robber turned writer, notes that given Parker's "cold, methodical [and] humorless" habits, the character would be the villain in most books. But Nussbaum also identifies two critical elements that make Parker a sympathetic protagonist: he is surrounded by criminals even more ruthless than he and though Parker is capable of using violence he rarely if ever initiates violence except in self-defense.

== Character ==
While in 1966's The Handle, Parker's age is explicitly stated to be 38, Parker is, essentially, an ageless character—in the various Parker novels that were written and take place over a span of 45 years, Parker always appears to be somewhere around 40.

Physically, Parker is described in the opening paragraphs of The Hunter as "big and shaggy, with flat square shoulders... His hands, swinging curve-fingered at his sides, looked like they were molded of brown clay by a sculptor who thought big and liked veins. His hair was brown and dry and dead, blowing around his head like a poor toupee about to fly loose. His face was a chipped chunk of concrete, with eyes of flawed onyx. His mouth was a quick stroke, bloodless." When asked about who he would cast as Parker, Westlake stated: "Usually I don’t put an actor’s face to the character, though with Parker, in the early days, I did think he probably looked something like Jack Palance. That may be partly because you knew Palance wasn’t faking it, and Parker wasn’t faking it either. Never once have I caught him winking at the reader." In The Man With the Getaway Face, Parker has plastic surgery in an attempt to evade The Outfit's retribution, so he's no longer recognizable to most who knew him before, though his general appearance (and the impression it makes on others) seems to be largely unchanged.

In terms of his interactions with others, Parker dislikes small talk, and has little use for social pleasantries. Instead, he prefers to converse as little as possible, and will end conversations abruptly once he feels that he has obtained the information he requires. Parker has few interests outside his work, and when he is planning or executing a heist, he is focused on it to the exclusion of almost everything else. However, once the heist is complete, Parker has an almost overwhelming desire to have sex. Though he has a wide range of professional contacts, Parker has no friends.

His first name is never revealed in the series, a decision Westlake has stated he made when thinking that The Hunter would be a standalone book and which he stuck to even though it complicated writing the subsequent books. Westlake himself never definitively settled on a first name for the character, once musing "I don't know what the hell it would be, maybe Frank."

No mention is ever made of Parker's family. While the events of previous novels are frequently referred to throughout the series, very little that happened in Parker's life before his appearance in The Hunter is ever discussed. In The Outfit, it is stated that he had been in the Army from 1942 to 1944 and had been given a bad conduct discharge for blackmarketeering.

The closest Westlake has ever come to alluding to Parker's childhood is in the novel Butcher's Moon, when Parker surveys the fictional city of Tyler and thinks to himself that it is a very different place from where he grew up. As well, in The Sour Lemon Score, it's mentioned that Parker was "born and raised in cities", but no further details are offered. In The Outfit (which explicitly takes place in late 1963) Parker does state he had already been a thief for 18 years, and refers to a heist he committed in 1949. In Chapter 3 of The Man With the Getaway Face it is mentioned that Parker "owned a couple parking lots and gas stations around the country". He has virtually no involvement with the operation of these businesses, allowing the managers to skim profits in exchange for creating the appearance of Parker having a legitimate source of income to avoid suspicion from "internal revenue beagles".

In the essay The Gentrification of Crime, which appeared in the March 28, 1985 issue of The New York Review of Books, Lucy Sante offered the following analysis of the character:

In Parker's world there is no good or evil, but simply different styles of crime. There is no law, so Parker cannot be caught, but merely injured or delayed. The subversive implication is not that crime pays, but that all business is crime. Among the Homeric epithets that follow Parker from book to book is: 'He had to be a businessman of some kind. The way he looked, big and square and hard, it had to be a tough and competitive business; used cars maybe, or jukeboxes.' He is a loner, competing with conglomerates (the syndicate) and fending off marginal elements (psychotics, amateurs). He has no interest in society except as a given, like the weather, and none in power. He is a freebooter who acquires money in order to buy himself periods of vegetative quiet.

Contrary to what Sante says, Parker was arrested and imprisoned twice in the series—first in The Hunter for vagrancy, then much later, in Breakout after a heist goes wrong. In both cases, his real identity wasn't known to the authorities at the time of arrest, and he escaped both times from facilities with relatively low security. However, Parker's always very aware that the law is out there, and that his fingerprints are linked to the murder of a guard at a prison camp—which means that he has no chance of ever being released if caught and properly identified. In the original version of The Hunter submitted to publishers, Parker was stopped by the police at the end, and killed trying to escape. Bucklin Moon, an editor for Pocket Books, said he'd buy the novel, on condition that Parker got away, so that he could appear in a series of books, instead of just one.

In a similar tone, author Ian Sansom, in The Guardian (March 3, 2007), wrote of Parker as

...always restless, always on the move; forever hunted, forever hunting, crisscrossing the country following the mighty dollar, trying to make his way in the only way he knows how: through scheming, cheating, and the exercise of brute force. But Parker is by no means merely evil, merciless or insane; the brilliance of the books lies in their blurring of the distinction between madness and sanity, justice and mercy. Parker is not so much sick as blank, with the deep blankness of... humanity stripped to its essentials... [he is] callous, unable to feel guilt for his actions, completely lacking in empathy and incapable of learning from his own bitter experience... we admire and yearn for Parker's demented sense of purpose: he feels no embarrassment or shame... he is never afflicted or careworn; he is, in the way of all existential heroes and madmen, somehow stenchless, blameless and utterly free.

== Novel structure ==
Westlake used the same structure for many—not all, but many—of the Parker novels, a method that Library Review described as "clever."

Each book is divided into four sections of roughly equal length, each in turn subdivided into shorter chapters. The first and second sections are written in a limited third-person perspective focused entirely on Parker as he plans and undertakes a robbery or heist with colleagues. The second section ends on a cliffhanger, as Parker is betrayed—often injured and left for dead. Section three shifts to the perspective of Parker's opponents, usually in flashback as they plan and execute their double-cross. Section four returns to Parker's perspective as he survives the plot against him and sets out for revenge.

== Appearances ==
=== Novels by Richard Stark ===
The first novel in Parker's series is The Hunter (adapted to film twice: as Point Blank in 1967, and as Payback in 1999), in which he chases a past associate who betrayed him in a heist and left him for dead. He survives, but is arrested by the police. Slowly and methodically, Parker tracks down Mal Resnick, his former accomplice, who intimidated Parker's weak-willed wife into shooting her husband after the job had been completed. When the gambling syndicate known as The Outfit refuses to return to Parker his share of the loot Resnick gave them to make good on a debt, Parker takes on The Outfit as well, a storyline that figures in several subsequent books in the series.

In subsequent novels, Parker is often at work, putting together a team of professionals to plan and execute daring heists. Parker's numerous memorable adventures include robbing an entire town in The Score, a football stadium in The Seventh, an island casino in The Handle, an Air Force base in The Green Eagle Score, and a rock concert in Deadly Edge. Always perfectly blueprinted heists, Parker's plans tend to go awry in the execution, sometimes due to bad luck but more often due to greed or incompetence on the part of Parker's less-experienced partners. The tension in the novels often comes from Parker having to work his way out of increasingly dangerous situations on the fly, as his carefully planned heist collapses around him—all while he tries to keep hold of both the money he stole, and his life. (And, often, he does so while endeavoring to exact revenge on those responsible for his troubles.)

Throughout the course of the series, Parker has operated under a number of pseudonyms, and it is implied that the name Parker itself is an alias. In the first novel in the series, Parker is arrested for vagrancy and is imprisoned in a work camp under the name Ronald Kasper, a name that is linked to his real fingerprints. In the next five novels in the series, The Man with the Getaway Face, The Outfit, The Mourner, The Score, and The Jugger, Parker lives comfortably in a Florida hotel under the name Charles Willis between jobs, but is forced to abandon this identity (and the money that goes with it) when police show up at his hotel at the end of The Jugger. In some later books, he uses Edward Latham as his "straight" name. It's mainly other heavy heisters and people who live outside the law who know him as Parker.

In the novel The Rare Coin Score, Parker meets Claire Carroll, the woman who will become his companion for the rest of the series. They live together somewhere in northern New Jersey in a lake house owned under the name Claire Willis (she took this surname from Parker's past). In the novel Backflash, their home is described as "a house on a lake called Colliver Pond, seventy miles from New York, a deep rural corner where New York and New Jersey and Pennsylvania meet... mostly a resort community, lower-level white-collar, people who came here three months every summer and left their 'cottages' unoccupied the rest of the year... For Parker, it was ideal. A place to stay, to lie low when nothing was going on, a 'home' as people called it, and no neighbors. In the summer, when the clerks came out to swim and fish and boat, Parker and Claire went somewhere else."

- The Hunter (Pocket Books, 1962; re-released in 1999 under the title Payback as a movie tie-in by Grand Central Publishing)
- The Man with the Getaway Face (Pocket Books, 1963) also published as The Steel Hit
- The Outfit (Pocket Books, 1963)
- The Mourner (Pocket Books, 1963)
- The Score (Pocket Books, 1964) also published as Killtown
- The Jugger (Pocket Books, 1965)
- The Seventh (Pocket Books, 1966) also published as The Split
- The Handle (Pocket Books, 1966) also published as Run Lethal
- The Rare Coin Score (Gold Medal, 1967)
- The Green Eagle Score (Gold Medal, 1967)
- The Black Ice Score (Gold Medal, 1968)
- The Sour Lemon Score (Gold Medal, 1969)
- Deadly Edge (Random House, 1971)
- Slayground (Random House, 1971 — first chapter shared with The Blackbird, a novel in Stark's Alan Grofield series)
- Plunder Squad (Random House, 1972)
- Butcher's Moon (Random House, 1974)
- Comeback (Mysterious Press, 1997)
- Backflash (Mysterious Press, 1998)
- Flashfire (Mysterious Press, 2000)
- Firebreak (Mysterious Press, 2001)
- Breakout (Mysterious Press, 2002)
- Nobody Runs Forever (Mysterious Press, 2004)
- Ask the Parrot (Mysterious Press, 2006)
- Dirty Money (Grand Central, 2008)

Also appears in:

- The Blackbird (1969) by Richard Stark — Parker appears only in the first chapter of this novel starring Alan Grofield.
- Dead Skip (1972) by Joe Gores — Parker appears briefly in Chapter 18, in a sequence that was also described (from a different viewpoint) in Plunder Squad (1972). Gores hints further at the connection between the two books by referring to Parker's associates as "the plunder squad." Additionally, earlier in the novel, the book's protagonist is described as being a reader only of Richard Stark novels.
- Jimmy the Kid (1974) by Donald E. Westlake — This novel in Westlake's John Dortmunder series features the gang planning a caper based on a Parker novel they have. Chapters alternate between Parker committing a kidnapping (in the otherwise unavailable novel Child Heist) and the Dortmunder gang screwing it up as they try to imitate Parker. Only a few chapters of Child Heist are featured, and this particular Parker story is not complete on its own.

== Influences ==
=== Literary spinoffs and crossovers ===
The Westlake novel The Hot Rock (1970) was originally intended to feature Parker, but the plot, which involves a precious gem that is stolen, lost, stolen again, lost again, and so on seemed too comic a situation for the hard-boiled Parker, so Westlake rewrote the novel with a more bumbling and likable cast of characters, including John Dortmunder, who is Parker seen through a comic mirror. The third Dortmunder novel, Jimmy the Kid (1974), features a plot in which Dortmunder and his associates base a kidnapping on a plan from a (fictitious) Parker novel called Child Heist. Ironically, in the main Parker novels, Parker repeatedly expresses disgust for kidnappers. Good Behavior (1985) was originally intended as the seventeenth Parker novel following Butcher's Moon (1974), but, like The Hot Rock, was rewritten for Dortmunder. Good Behavior bore the dedication "To P., 1962-1974"—the dates the original Parker novels were published.

The Parker novel Plunder Squad (1972) contains a brief encounter with a San Francisco detective named Kearney, who is not looking for Parker but for one of his associates. The same encounter is described from Kearney's point of view in the Joe Gores DKA novel Dead Skip (1972). Westlake and Gores repeated the same trick in 1990 with matching sequences in the DKA novel 32 Cadillacs and the Dortmunder novel Drowned Hopes.

The second Dortmunder novel, Bank Shot has Dortmunder's new accomplice Herman X claim to have been involved in a robbery with Stan Devers, Mort Kobler (who appears in The Outfit) and George Cathcart (who briefly appears in the final Grofield novel, Lemons Never Lie). Dortmunder is familiar with Kobler and his friend Kelp knows Cathcart.

=== Portrayals ===
Parker has been portrayed numerous times in films. Westlake refused to allow productions to use the name unless a whole series of films were planned based on the novels. Substitute characters were created—starting with Lee Marvin starring as Walker in Point Blank (based on The Hunter), Michel Constantin as Georges in Pillaged (based on The Score), Anna Karina as Paula Nelson in Made in U.S.A. (partly based on The Jugger), Jim Brown as McClain in The Split, Robert Duvall as Earl Macklin in The Outfit, Peter Coyote as Stone in Slayground, and Mel Gibson as Porter in Payback (the second screen adaptation based on The Hunter).

After Westlake's death, his widow, Abby, sold the screen rights to the novel Flashfire to producer Les Alexander and allowed for the name Parker to be used in the adaptation, with the option of further novels being adapted should the first one prove successful. Jason Statham was cast as the titular character in Parker. Over a decade later, Amazon Studios optioned the entire Parker property with the intent to launch a shared universe consisting of films and television shows. Filmmaker Shane Black wrote and directed Play Dirty, an original story that doesn't adapt any of the novels but takes elements from the series. Mark Wahlberg was cast as Parker.

=== Homages ===
Renowned horror author Stephen King has said that his novel The Dark Half (and its subsequent film adaptation) was largely inspired by the books Westlake wrote under the Richard Stark pseudonym. The novel's main antagonist, George Stark, was based on Westlake's Parker character, and the character's last name was an homage to Westlake; according to King, he personally contacted Westlake to ask permission to use the name. King's own pseudonym, Richard Bachman, was also inspired by Westlake's pen name, as King had been reading a Richard Stark book at the time he chose it.

Author Dan Simmons has paid homage to Westlake and his Parker character with three hard-boiled action novels featuring the character of Joe Kurtz, a past and current private investigator who spent time in Attica prison. The first novel, Hardcase, is dedicated to Richard Stark/Donald Westlake. In the third Kurtz novel, Hard as Nails, Kurtz mentions that he did not know his father, but that he was a career criminal thief who went by a single name and would have sex with women after a job, a clear reference to Parker.

Max Allan Collins authored a series of novels with a protagonist named "Nolan" who was an homage to Westlake's Parker. Collins said of the character: "[T]he concept was to take a Parker-like character who has reached the ancient age of 48 and wants badly to retire, and of course needs one last heist to do so."

The television series Leverage features a character named "Parker". As played by Beth Riesgraf, Parker is an expert thief, cat-burglar, pickpocket and safe-cracker. Like Stark's Parker, this character is also only known by the single name "Parker".

Jim Doherty's short story, "The Ghost of Dillinger," published in the anthology Tales from the Red Lion, pits his series cop, Dan Sullivan, against a legendary criminal named "Karper," whose backstory derives from Stark's Parker novels. Doherty contacted Westlake ahead of time to get approval for this deliberate homage to his character.

The graphic novel Selina's Big Score by Darwyn Cooke, featuring the DC Comics character Catwoman, includes a character resembling Parker, an experienced professional thief known only by his last name, Stark—a reference to the pseudonym used by Westlake for the Parker novels.

== In other media ==
=== Films ===
- Made in USA (1966) was based on the novel The Jugger and directed by Jean-Luc Godard. It starred Anna Karina as a journalist investigating the disappearance of her boyfriend. Characters were named after the writer David Goodis, director Don Siegel and actor Richard Widmark — people influential in the genre of film noir. The film's producer, Georges de Beauregard, did not complete payments for rights to the novel, so Westlake took him to court (after litigation Westlake was given North American distribution rights). The film had a theatrical release in the U.S. in 2009.
- Point Blank (1967, MGM) was based on the novel The Hunter. It was directed by John Boorman and starred Lee Marvin as Walker, the Parker character. The film also starred Angie Dickinson, John Vernon, Carroll O'Connor and Keenan Wynn.
- Pillaged (1967) was a French film based on the novel The Score and directed by Alain Cavalier. Michel Constantin played Georges, the Parker character, and Franco Interlenghi appeared as Maurice, the Grofield character. An English-dubbed version, titled Midnight Raid, was distributed by United Artists to some territories in 1969. The film did not have a theatrical release in the U.S. until 2013, when it was screened at the Museum of Modern Art (MOMA).
- The Split (1968, MGM) was based on the novel The Seventh. It starred Jim Brown as McClain, the Parker character. It also starred Gene Hackman, Julie Harris, Diahann Carroll, Jack Klugman, Donald Sutherland, Warren Oates, James Whitmore and Ernest Borgnine.
- The Outfit (1973, MGM) was based on the novel of the same name. It was directed by John Flynn and starred Robert Duvall as Earl Macklin, the Parker character. It also starred Joe Don Baker, Karen Black and Robert Ryan.
- Slayground (1983) was based on the novel of the same name. It was directed by Terry Bedford and starred Peter Coyote as Stone.
- Payback (1999) was based on the novel The Hunter. Writer/director Brian Helgeland was removed from the project after test screenings and new footage was written by Terry Hayes and directed by Paul Abascal. The film starred Mel Gibson as Porter, the Parker character. It also featured Gregg Henry, Maria Bello, David Paymer, Deborah Kara Unger, Kris Kristofferson, Lucy Liu and an uncredited James Coburn. Helgeland's version was released as Payback – Straight Up: The Director's Cut for a small theatrical run in 2006 and on DVD in 2007. This version's plot more closely follows the novel.
- Parker, an adaptation of the novel Flashfire, was released in January 2013. Jason Statham stars as the title character, along with Jennifer Lopez, Nick Nolte, and Michael Chiklis.
- Play Dirty is a 2025 film with an original story. Mark Wahlberg stars as Parker, along with LaKeith Stanfield, and Rosa Salazar.

=== Comics ===
- Darwyn Cooke wrote and illustrated a graphic novel based on The Hunter published by IDW in July 2009. The story is a faithful adaptation of the novel, retaining its 1962 setting. Cooke produced the work in consultation with Westlake (who died before he could see the final product). Westlake was reportedly impressed enough that he gave his blessing for Cooke to use the name Parker for the central character—something he had not allowed with any film adaptation of the Parker novels. Cooke went on to adapt The Outfit, released in October 2010. The third adaptation, The Score, was released in July 2012, and the fourth—Slayground—was released in January 2014. Slayground also contained an adaptation of The Seventh in abbreviated form as an added bonus. The contract to adapt the series had been extended past the intended four books, as Cooke wanted very much to adapt Butcher's Moon, and possibly others, but Cooke's death in 2016 left these plans unfinished.
