= Parker (2013 film) =

2013 film by Taylor Hackford

- Theatrical release poster
- Directed by: Taylor Hackford
- Written by: John J. McLaughlin
- Based on: Flashfire by Donald E. Westlake
- Produced by: Les Alexander; Steven Chasman; Taylor Hackford; Sidney Kimmel; Jonathan Mitchell
- Starring: Jason Statham; Jennifer Lopez; Michael Chiklis; Bobby Cannavale; Nick Nolte
- Cinematography: J. Michael Muro
- Edited by: Mark Warner
- Music by: David Buckley
- Production companies: Incentive Filmed Entertainment; Sierra Pictures; Alexander/Mitchell; Current Entertainment; Sidney Kimmel Entertainment; Anvil Films
- Distributed by: FilmDistrict
- Release dates: January 24, 2013 (Las Vegas); January 25, 2013 (United States)
- Running time: 118 minutes
- Country: United States
- Language: English
- Budget: $31–35 million
- Box office: $46.2 million

Parker is a 2013 American action thriller film directed by Taylor Hackford and written by John J. McLaughlin. Starring Jason Statham and Jennifer Lopez, the film is adapted from Flashfire, the 19th Parker novel written by Donald Westlake under the pen name Richard Stark. Primarily set in Palm Beach, Florida, Parker marked a departure for Hackford, who hoped to make it his first film noir. The film, produced on a $35 million budget, was conceived following Westlake's 2008 death, when producer Les Alexander secured the rights to it.

The film was premiered in Las Vegas, Nevada, on January 24, 2013, and was released in the United States on January 25, 2013, where it generally received mixed reviews, with many critics feeling the film was a poor adaptation of the book and typical of Statham's sub-par action films of the past few years. Many found Statham well-fitted for the role of Parker and praised Lopez for providing comedic relief. It grossed $46 million worldwide at the box office.

Parker premiered on Netflix in the United States in March 2021, and a week later was briefly the #1 film on the streaming service.

== Plot ==
Parker is a professional thief who is asked by his mentor Hurley to take charge of a job with a crew he does not know, consisting of Melander, Carlson, Ross, and Hardwicke. They succeed in robbing the Ohio State Fair, but Hardwicke alters part of Parker's plan, resulting in an unnecessary fire and one death. Enraged about the killing, Parker refuses to participate in a jewel robbery they offer. Needing his share of the Ohio loot to finance the bigger job, Melander tells Hardwicke to kill Parker and they leave him on the side of the road. Parker survives the gunshot and is picked up by a farming family. After escaping from the hospital, Hurley directs Parker to New Orleans, where Hardwicke's brother tells him the crew are in Palm Beach, Florida.

Hurley tries to convince Parker to take his own money and leave the issue alone to protect him and his daughter Claire (who is also Parker's girlfriend) from retribution brought by Hardwicke's uncle Danzinger, a mob boss in Chicago. Parker refuses. Danzinger's hitman tries to capture Claire, but she escapes. Parker goes to Palm Beach and masquerades as a rich Texas oil baron named Daniel Parmitt looking for an expensive house. Real estate agent Leslie Rodgers shows him a supposedly vacant home recently purchased by someone named Rodrigo, which piques his interest. Leslie is a struggling divorcee, who asks Parker on a date, but he declines. When she checks his credit she finds his identity (obtained from one of Hurley's connections) is phony.

Desperate for money and a way out of her mother's condo, Leslie offers her help. When Parker tells her the next job is a jewel heist, Leslie says there is a jewel auction nearby. The hitman finds Parker and attacks him in his hotel, but Parker throws him from the balcony and, although injured, escapes. A policeman comes to Leslie's condo asking about Parmitt and the altercation (since she showed him houses). During the conversation, Leslie finds a bleeding Parker on her porch. She gets the policeman to leave, promising him a list of the places she showed "Parmitt". Despite his injuries, Parker insists on carrying out his revenge against Melander's crew that night.

Melander and his crew enter the auction to set up speakers rigged with fireworks. Later, they enter as a fire team and steal the jewels, escaping by boat. Parker waits for them at their house where, earlier, he had broken in and planted guns and damaged their weapons' firing pins. When they return, he prepares to attack, but Leslie also arrives and is captured by Melander. With the help of one of his planted guns and the bent firing pins, Leslie and Parker manage to kill the entire crew. Parker gives Leslie the jewels for safekeeping and tells her he will find a way to fence them in the future. He subsequently kills Danzinger in Chicago, mails Leslie her cut a year and a half later, and sends money to the farmers who saved him.

== Cast ==
- Jason Statham as Parker
- Jennifer Lopez as Leslie Rodgers
- Michael Chiklis as Melander
- Wendell Pierce as Carlson
- Clifton Collins Jr. as Ross
- Bobby Cannavale as Jake Fernandez
- Patti LuPone as Ascension
- Carlos Carrasco as Norte
- Micah Hauptman as August Hardwicke
- Emma Booth as Claire
- Nick Nolte as Hurley

== Production ==
=== Conception ===
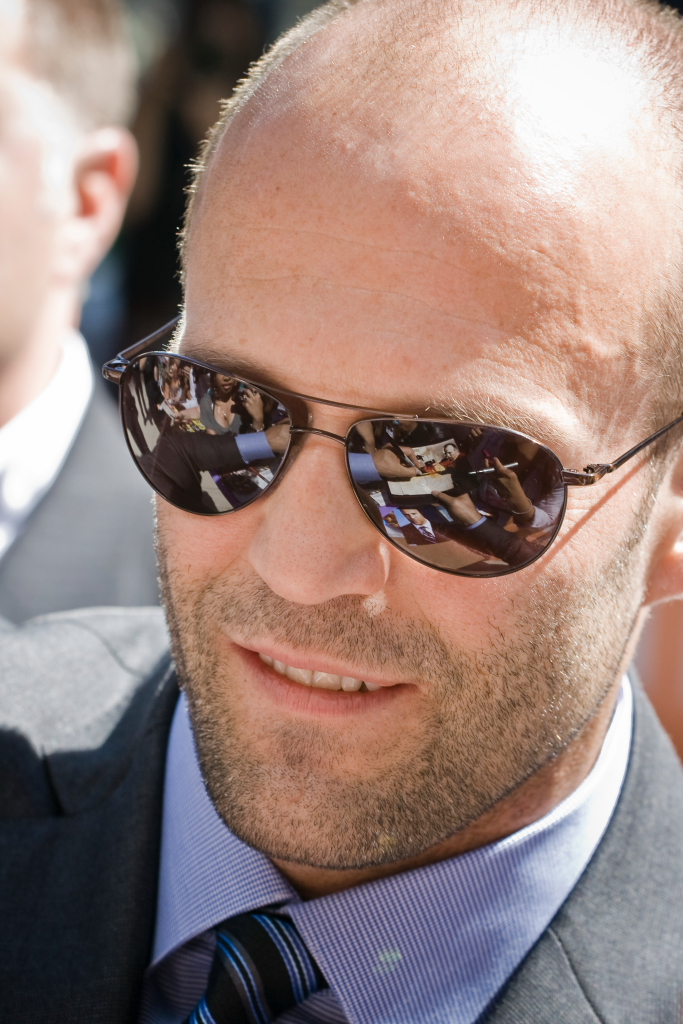
Jason Statham said that Parker, although an anti-hero, has a likable quality.

Prior to this film, Parker had first appeared decades earlier in the 1962 novel The Hunter, written by Donald E. Westlake, which spawned a book series that included over twenty other novels. He had also been depicted in several films including Point Blank (1967) and Payback (1999), among others. Westlake always refused to let any adaptation name the character Parker unless producers agreed to adapt all the novels (Lee Marvin portrayed the character as Walker in Point Blank while Mel Gibson portrayed Porter in Payback). In 2008, following Westlake's death, his widow Abby, having been contacted by Les Alexander, a television producer who was a longtime acquaintance of Westlake's, agreed to sell the rights to one Parker novel (including the right to use Parker's name), with the option of several more being adapted later if the first film was successful. Alexander hired a friend of his named John McLaughlin to write the screenplay for Parker, and then director Taylor Hackford became involved. When the film opened, Taylor Hackford said in an interview that he did not think Westlake would have agreed to let Parker's name be used under these circumstances.

Hackford directed the film, and Steven Chasman, Hackford, Alexander, Sidney Kimmel, and Jonathan Mitchell produced. Hackford was excited to make Parker his "first sort of film noir", stating: "I don't want to get stuck in a genre. What I like the most about this piece of material is that you can take a genre piece like this and turn it into a great movie." Speaking with Palm Beach Daily News about what led him to Parker, Hackford stated "I’m a fan of Donald Westlake. I really think he’s a fabulous writer … very unique in the area of crime because his Parker series". Hackford was attracted to Parker because he was a "strange character" and "sociopath" who, at the same time, is not a sociopath, describing him as "compelling".

=== Pre-production and casting ===
On April 18, 2011, Justin Kroll of Variety reported that Statham would play the role of Parker. Of Parker, Statham has commented that he's "a man who lives by a certain moral code. ... So there’s a likeable quality to this anti-hero." The actor noted that: "He’s involved in criminal activities but he perceives all business to be in some way crooked. He never steals from people who can’t afford it and he doesn’t hurt people that don’t deserve it." During the film, Parker is seen posing as a priest and as a wealthy Texan named Daniel Parmitt from San Antonio.

On June 21, 2011, it was revealed that Lopez was in talks to play "the female lead, a character named Leslie, who gets involved with Parker as he executes a heist". Lopez's casting was confirmed, along with Nick Nolte, who played Parker's mentor. Lopez and Nolte previously worked together on the film U Turn (1997). Hackford noted the role of Leslie as a departure from her other work, considering she had been acting in romantic comedies for the previous several years. Leslie is a "savvy insider" who's "short on cash, but big on looks, smarts and ambition." Initially, she only partners with Parker for her own financial gain, but eventually becomes romantically involved with Parker. Wendell Pierce, Clifton Collins Jr., Michael Chiklis, Patti LuPone, and Emma Booth also co-starred in Parker. In the novel Flashfire, Leslie was not of Cuban descent. However, Hackford cast Lopez in the role and decided to re-write her as Cuban, hiring Italian-American LuPone to play her "domineering" mother.

=== Filming ===
According to executive producer Nick Meyer, Parker was produced on a "mid-30s" budget range, which he described as "pretty good", "given the caliber of the movie". The Times-Picayune's Mike Scott reported on June 23, 2011, that Parker would film in New Orleans for seven weeks starting July 18. Scott noted that filming in New Orleans was "good news" for the local film industry because it came "at a time that has historically seen a slowdown in major productions, due both to the oppressive heat and the arrival of hurricane season." Playbill later confirmed that production for the film had begun on August 4, 2011, in New Orleans. Filming briefly moved to Baton Rouge, Louisiana from August 5–9.

Parker was also filmed in Palm Beach, Florida where Lopez and Statham were spotted that September. In an interview with the town's local newspaper, Hackford said: "Palm Beach is a fascinating area. You’ve got this incredibly rich, exclusive enclave and right across the bridge you’ve got real life. And I was depicting both". Variety noted that locals were also "shook up" by helicopters, firetrucks and marine patrol boats, "bringing big-time filmmaking to an area better known for leisure-time activities." The action scenes were filmed in Boca Raton, Florida. Cinematographer J. Michael Muro shot the film with Red Epic digital cameras and Hawk V-Lite anamorphic lenses.

Statham, who is a former diver for the British Olympic Team, performed all of Parker's stunts in the film. In one scene, Statham jumped out of the window of a fast-moving car for his character to escape being shot; this stunt was considered "really dangerous" and Hackford said he was "nervous when he went out that window" five or six times before the scene was finished. In another scene, Statham had to hang off a building's balcony. The actor said he took a "real beating" from these scenes. He blamed this on wearing a wire, which got in the way of filming and made things feel "restricted", because they ripped up his arms. In January 2012, filming for Parker concluded in Miami and in Columbus, Ohio.

== Release ==
=== Marketing ===
Originally, Parker was set to be released on October 12, 2012. However, the release date was moved back due to strong competition it would have faced at the box office from other films released around that time including Gangster Squad (which later had its release date swapped with Argo, and later moved to January due to the 2012 Aurora, Colorado shooting.) and Here Comes the Boom. Matt Goldberg, writing for Collider, noted that it would have probably lost to these films if it had been released that October. Boxoffice listed the pros of the film release, which were Statham's "consistent" performance at the box office and Lopez's appearance which "could help the film expand a bit beyond Statham's usual audience". It also listed the cons, which are Lopez's presence that might "turn off some of Statham's usual audience" as well as heavy competition from multiple other films.

The film's first promotional poster was unveiled on October 1, 2012. Its theatrical trailer was released on October 4, 2012. Collider commented that despite this being a slightly different film than what Statham is known for, the trailer "still has its share of clichés". Joblo's Paul Shirley said "It's got a lot of the usual Statham action goodies", but with "source material and stellar cast" it has potential to be a theatrical hit. Simon Reynolds of Digital Spy noted the pairing of "tough guy" Statham and "global superstar" Lopez to be "unlikely" but said Parker promises to "serve up some meaty action thrills". On January 3, 2013, Digital Spy unveiled another promotional poster for Parker.

== Reception ==
=== Box office ===
Parker was released in 2,224 U.S. theaters on January 25, 2013, grossing slightly over $7 million and opening at number five at the box office. This was two million shy of what it was predicted to earn prior, and the film was considered an average grosser. By the end of its 70-day North American release, Parker had grossed $17.6 million at the box office, placing it at the low end of Statham's wide release crime/action vehicles. It finished in 118th place on the 2013 domestic release box office chart. The film was released on Blu-ray and DVD in the United States on May 21, 2013. It was not one of the Top 100 selling DVDs of 2013, grossing a total of $11,274,235 on DVD and Blu-ray.

=== Critical response ===
The studio required critics attending press screenings to sign an agreement that none of their reviews would appear in print before the film opened. On Rotten Tomatoes, the film has an approval rating of 42% based on 103 reviews, with an average rating of 4.8/10. The site's critical consensus reads, "Jason Statham is game as usual, but Parker is a thoroughly generic and convoluted heist movie." Metacritic gave the film a score of 42 out of 100, based on 21 critics, indicating "mixed or average reviews". Audiences polled by CinemaScore gave the film an average grade of "B+" on an A+ to F scale.

John Semley of Slant Magazine was not receptive to Parker, panning its "painfully slapdash script", although the Miami Herald's Connie Ogle felt that while it was a "stretch" with "absurdities", Statham "turns out to be a good choice to play the taciturn thief." Christy Lemire, film critic for the Associated Press, felt that Statham is "not exactly pushing himself outside his comfort zone", and Lopez is "here to provide some comic relief as the wide-eyed fish out of water."

Alonso Duralde of The Wrap called the film a "bore" considering Statham's potential as an action star, and Joe Morgenstern of The Wall Street Journal was also negative, saying that the film set a "tin standard" for crime thrillers.

Variety's Brian Lowry praised Hackford for fashioning the "50-year-old franchise into a neat-fitting outfit for Statham" which was "crisp and efficient", noting its use of Lopez to "good effect." While reviewing Lopez's performance, many critics drew comparisons to Out of Sight in which Lopez starred opposite George Clooney 15 years earlier. Stephen Farber of The Hollywood Reporter said the film's "biggest surprise" is Lopez's performance, in which she "downplays her glamorous image to give a refreshingly low-key portrayal of a put-upon, financially strapped working woman who manages to be useful to Parker when he least expects it." Additionally, Farber praised Statham as making a "convincingly bruised protagonist." A. O. Scott of The New York Times gave Parker a positive review, enjoying Lopez's "exercising her talent for damsel-in-distress silliness" and said, "And if Parker is, in the end, business as usual, it is also a pretty good deal."

Betsy Sharkey of the Los Angeles Times positively reviewed the film, calling it a "faithful adaption" of Flashfire, although film reviewer James Berardinelli was displeased with the lack of character development for Leslie, criticizing the heavy amount of screen-time dedicated to Parker's girlfriend Claire (Emma Booth). Nonetheless, Berardinelli gave Parker a generally positive review, summarizing its action scenes as "crisply directed, brutal, and invigorating."

Other critics panned Parker and its action sequences to be predictable and generic. Writing for The A.V. Club, Josh Modell said the film's beginning was "fairly strong", although the action "gets more predictable as it meanders toward its conclusion." Peter Howell of the Toronto Star said the film started off "promisingly" but ended "predictable", while the Montreal Gazette's Bill Brownstein panned the film by stating, "Much gunplay and bloodletting ensues. The body count is high. Intrigue is low." Lisa Schwarzbaum of Entertainment Weekly's review was along the same lines, calling it "unremarkably generic" and "insanely bloody."
