= Slayground =

1983 British film by Terry Bedford

- DVD cover
- Directed by: Terry Bedford
- Screenplay by: Trevor Preston
- Based on: Slayground by Donald E. Westlake
- Produced by: John Dark; Gower Frost
- Starring: Peter Coyote; Mel Smith; Billie Whitelaw
- Cinematography: Stephen Smith
- Edited by: Nick Gaster
- Music by: Colin Towns
- Production companies: Thorn EMI; Jennie and Company
- Distributed by: Columbia-EMI-Warner Distributors
- Release date: December 1983 (United Kingdom)
- Running time: 89 minutes
- Country: United Kingdom
- Language: English
- Budget: $5 million or £3,500,000

Slayground is a 1983 British crime thriller film directed by Terry Bedford and starring Peter Coyote, Mel Smith and Billie Whitelaw. The screenplay was by Trevor Preston, adapted from Slayground, the 14th Parker novel (1971) by Donald E. Westlake (as Richard Stark).

== Premise ==
An armed robbery involving criminal Stone goes wrong when an inexperienced getaway driver accidentally causes the death of a nine-year-old girl in a car crash. The girl's millionaire father arranges for a bounty hunter, Costello, to kill the three criminals involved, including Stone. Stone flees to England where he stays with an old friend, Abbatt.

Costello kills Stone's two associates in the robbery, and a friend who facilitates Stone's trip to England. Stone's wife goes to hide in Mexico. Stone tries to help Abbatt with some troubles the latter is having with gangsters.

Costello arrives in England. He kills a friend of Abbatt's and then Abbatt himself before Stone shoots Costello dead.

== Cast ==
- Peter Coyote as Stone
- Mel Smith as Terry Abbatt
- Billie Whitelaw as Madge
- Philip Sayer as Costello
- Bill Luhrs as Joe Sheer
- Marie Masters as Joni
- Clarence Felder as Orxel
- Ned Eisenberg as Lonzini
- David Hayward as Laufman
- Michael M. Ryan as Danard
- Barrett Mulligan as Lucy
- Kelli Maroney as Jolene
- Margareta Arvidssen as Grete
- Rosemary Martin as Dr. King
- Malcolm Terris as Venner
- Jon Morrison as Webb
- Cassie Stuart as Fran
- Debby Bishop as Beth
- Stephen Yardley as Turner
- P. H. Moriarty as Seeley
- Zig Byfield as Sams
- Erick Ray Evans as Malpas
- Bill Dean as compére
- Ozzie Yue as waiter
- Tony Devon as Joey

== Original novel ==
The film was based on a novel by Donald Westlake writing under the name "Richard Stark". It was published in 1971 and featured Parker, the hero of The Hunter (filmed as Point Blank.) (Slayground would be followed by Butcher's Moon.)

Very little of the novel was used in the film adaptation.

== Production ==
The film was developed by Barry Spikings when he was heard of EMI Films. In early 1983 Spikings left and Verity Lambert was appointed head of production. Slayground became the first movie part of Lambert's slate of films. It was the first feature directed by Terry Bedford and produced by Gower Frost, who had both made commercials with Adrian Lyne.

Lambert later said, "I wasn't very keen, but I thought, 'Well, I'm starting off and this is definitely different to television and maybe I have to go by somebody else's judgement'." She claimed the distributors were convinced the film would be a commercial hit. Filmink called it a "very random" selection.

Others in Lambert's slate included Comfort and Joy, Illegal Aliens (which became Morons from Outer Space) and Dreamchild. "I believe all these films have international appeal," said Lambert.

Two thirds of the film was shot in Britain, one third in the US. Filming took place in March 1983 on location at Southport and Blackpool Scenes were shot at Southport's Pleasureland amusement park and Blackpool's Pleasure Beach. Filming in America took place in and around Rockland County, New York.

Academic Paul Moody wrote in his story of EMI Films that Slayground "marks a transition point in EMI's history, both literally and metaphorically, and it has a liminal feel to it that betrays its origins from two divergent production strategies." He felt the fact the second half of the film moving to England was "a metaphorical handing over of the baton... a dramatic shift in tone from what had until then been a pedestrian American thriller, bringing in supernatural elements that shift the film towards a more English gothic sensibility." Moody felt "the film has some genuinely atmospheric moments and marks the point at which historically, EMI transitioned back towards making films set in Britain and which focused specifically on British culture."

== Reception ==
=== Box office ===
The film was not a success at the box office.

=== Critical ===
The Monthly Film Bulletin wrote: "Flashdance meets film noir for this disappointingly lame front-runner from the new EMI stable. A directing début for Terry Bedford, formerly lighting cameraman for Adrian Lyne then for Monty Python and the Holy Grail and Jabberwocky, and now teamed with commercials cameraman Stephen Smith, Slayground is full of portentous camerawork that loads even a simple bus-stop arrival with heavily irrelevant suspense. ... Slayground offers a beginner's course in customary crimethriller images, culminating in the fairground shoot-out, all ho-ho masks and halls of mirrors, for those who may have forgotten how these things always used to be done. Littered with fashionably upright corpses, the film offers the ultimate affront in the concept of its gloating, faceless killer, fountaining bullets as from the hosepipe of a demented gardener (our team has scrupulously noted Assault on Precinct 13 along with Lady from Shanghai and Bugsy Malone), and almost as immune to retaliation as the bogeyman in Halloween. Rather as with the mystery girl at the start – and, for that matter, the film's title itself – his presence seems to mean something but nobody, it appears, could quite remember what."

Leslie Halliwell said: "One of those tedious and violent films in which the criminal wins out; slickness seems to make it worse."

Filmink magazine called it "almost a text book example of how not to adapt a novel. Very little is kept from the original.. Instead, there’s three other stories going on – one about a killer trying to get Stone on behalf of a vengeful father, another about a teen Lolita who kills men who pick her up, and another about ex criminal Terry trying to establish a new life in Blackpool with his lady... None of these stories are done well." The magazine added "The movie completely betrays the character of Parker, one of the great bad-asses in literature" but praised the acting, production design and action sequences.

=== Accolades ===
Year	Award	Category	Recipient	Result	Ref.
1984	MystFest – Festival internazionale del giallo e del mistero	Best Film	Terry Bedford	Won	
1984	MystFest – Festival internazionale del giallo e del mistero	Golden Bee (Audience Award)	Terry Bedford	Won	
