= The Man with the Getaway Face =

Novel by Richard Stark (pseudonym of Donald E. Westlake)

- First edition (1963), with cover art by Harry Bennett.
- Author: Donald E. Westlake
- Language: English
- Publisher: Pocket Books
- Publication date: 1963

The Man with the Getaway Face is a 1963 crime thriller novel, written by Donald E. Westlake under the pseudonym Richard Stark and published by Pocket Books. It was also published under the title The Steel Hit. It is the second of the Parker novels.

== Plot ==
Stark's recurring character, Parker, has surgically altered his appearance to escape the mob and a contract on his life. Desperate for cash, he decides to join his old associates Skimm and Handy McKay to rob an armored car in New Jersey. Parker and Handy soon realize that the "finger" for the job, Skimm's girlfriend Alma, intends to kill Skimm and betray them. Moreover, an employee of Dr. Adler (who performed Parker's surgery) threatens to rat Parker out to the Outfit; Adler has been murdered, and Adler's employees think Parker is to blame.

== Publication history ==
The first UK edition of the novel was published in 1984 by Allison and Busby.

The Man with the Getaway Face was re-issued by the University of Chicago Press in August 2008.

== Adaptations ==
In 2010, The Man with the Getaway Face was adapted into a short pamphlet by cartoonist Darwyn Cooke. This adaptation became the first chapter of Cooke's graphic novel adaptation of The Outfit, which was released later that year.
