= The Split (film) =

1968 American film by Gordon Flemyng

- Theatrical release poster
- Directed by: Gordon Flemyng
- Screenplay by: Robert Sabaroff
- Based on: The Seventh; 1966 novel by Richard Stark
- Produced by: Robert Chartoff; Irwin Winkler
- Starring: Jim Brown; Diahann Carroll; Julie Harris; Gene Hackman; Jack Klugman; Warren Oates; James Whitmore; Ernest Borgnine
- Cinematography: Burnett Guffey
- Edited by: Rita Roland
- Music by: Quincy Jones
- Production company: Spectrum Productions
- Distributed by: Metro-Goldwyn-Mayer
- Release date: November 4, 1968
- Running time: 91 minutes
- Country: United States
- Language: English

The Split is a 1968 American neo-noir crime drama film directed by Gordon Flemyng. It was written by Robert Sabaroff, based upon the Parker novel The Seventh by Richard Stark (a pseudonym of Donald E. Westlake).

The film stars Jim Brown, along with Diahann Carroll, Julie Harris, Ernest Borgnine, Jack Klugman, Warren Oates, Donald Sutherland and Gene Hackman. The music is by Quincy Jones.

== Plot ==
Thieves fall out when more than a half-million dollars goes missing after the daring and carefully planned robbery of the Los Angeles Coliseum during a football game, each one accusing the other of having the money.

The heist has been masterminded by a man named McClain and his partner, Gladys. In choosing their accomplices carefully, McClain tests the mettle of his would-be partners. He challenges getaway driver Harry Kifka to a race, picks a fight with thug Bert Clinger, imprisons electrical expert Marty Gough in a wire-controlled vault to watch him fashion an escape, and has a shooting match with marksman Dave Negli before recruiting them and pulling off the job.

Together, the thieves make off with over $500,000. With the five men having carried out the heist and Gladys having financed it, the plan is to split the money six ways the next day. McClain stashes the money for the night with Ellie, his ex-wife. While his partners impatiently await their split of the loot, Lt. Walter Brill takes charge of the case. Ellie is attacked and killed by Herb Sutro, her landlord, who also steals the money.

The rest of the gang members hold McClain accountable for the lost money and demand that he retrieve it. Brill quickly solves the murder and is well aware of the connection to the robber. He kills Sutro, but keeps the money for himself. With Ellie's murderer identified, but still no trace of the money, the gang members all turn on McClain, assuming he's hiding it. This leads to a confrontation that ends with the deaths of Negli and Gladys.

McClain escapes and visits Brill, threatening to reveal that Brill has the money. He and Brill decide to divide it up between themselves, but the rest of McClain's gang has other ideas. After a shoot-out at the docks, only McClain and Brill are left—Brill decides to take a small part of the money, giving McClain his rightful sixth, and plans to return the rest to win a promotion. McClain is satisfied with the arrangement, but also haunted by Ellie's death. With his money, he is about to board a flight leaving town when he hears an off-screen female's voice call his name.

== Cast ==
- Jim Brown as McClain
- Diahann Carroll as Ellie Kennedy
- Ernest Borgnine as Bert Clinger
- Julie Harris as Gladys
- Gene Hackman as Lieutenant Walter Brill
- Jack Klugman as Harry Kifka
- Warren Oates as Marty Gough
- James Whitmore as Herb Sutro
- Donald Sutherland as Dave Negli
- Joyce Jameson as Jenifer
- Harry Hickox as Detective
- Jackie Joseph as Jackie
- Warren Vanders as Mason

== Production ==
The screenplay of The Split was written by Robert Sabaroff. The film was produced by Robert Chartoff and Irwin Winkler. They had just made Point Blank, another movie based on a Parker novel, for MGM. Winkler first offered the lead role to Steve McQueen, who was interested, but ultimately decided to make Bullitt instead. Brown, who had read the script and was enthusiastic about it, was then cast as the lead. At the time, Brown was under a long-term contract to MGM, which agreed to finance the movie, with the working title Run the Man Down. Brown was paid $125,000 for the film.

Chartoff and Winkler had had success with a British director, John Boorman, on Point Blank. Seeking another, they chose Gordon Flemyng, who had impressed them with his work on Great Catherine. A strong supporting cast for Brown was selected.

Said Chartoff of the lead character, "This negro is no Harvard graduate on his way to winning a Nobel prize ... He doesn't hit a white man just because he had been hit by him first."

Brown's original action double for the film was Black Stuntmen's Association founding member Calvin Brown. Prior to the 1960s, on the rare occasions that a stunt double was required for a black actor, he or she was usually played by a "painted down" white performer. Bill Cosby became instrumental in changing this practice when he refused to be doubled by painted down stuntmen on I Spy.

Released shortly after the MPAA rating system was introduced on November 1, 1968, the film is among the earliest titles to receive an R rating.

== Reception ==
In order to ensure a sizable black audience, The Split was previewed in Oakland, California.

The movie was not particularly well-received. Winkler wrote that it is "a solid thriller, no more, no less. Nothing to be ashamed of, nothing to be proud of, except the accidental casting that was groundbreaking." He concluded that "the film just wasn't good enough to capture an audience."

In his original review of the movie, Roger Ebert of the Chicago Sun-Times gave it two-and-a-half stars out of four. He described it as a well-made crime story, and praised the performances of Brown, Carroll and Sutherland. Ebert wrote that the film cleverly exploited the era's racial tensions in service of the plot, thereby making it "interesting in more ways than an action movie about a robbery ordinarily would be."

== See also ==
- List of American films of 1968
- Heist film
- List of hood films
