= Play Dirty (2025 film) =

2025 film by Shane Black

- Release poster
- Directed by: Shane Black
- Written by: Shane Black; Charles Mondry; Anthony Bagarozzi
- Based on: the Parker book series by Richard Stark
- Produced by: Jules Daly; Marc Toberoff; James W. Skotchdopole
- Starring: Mark Wahlberg; LaKeith Stanfield; Rosa Salazar; Keegan-Michael Key; Chukwudi Iwuji; Nat Wolff; Gretchen Mol; Thomas Jane; Tony Shalhoub
- Cinematography: Philippe Rousselot
- Edited by: Chris Lebenzon; Joel Negron
- Music by: Alan Silvestri
- Production companies: Team Downey; Big Red Films; Toberoff Productions
- Distributed by: Amazon MGM Studios (via Prime Video)
- Release date: October 1, 2025
- Running time: 128 minutes
- Country: United States
- Language: English

Play Dirty is a 2025 American heist action thriller film co-written and directed by Shane Black. It is based on the Parker book series by Donald E. Westlake, written under the pen name Richard Stark. The film stars Mark Wahlberg as the lead character Parker and LaKeith Stanfield as Grofield, another recurring Stark character, along with Rosa Salazar, Keegan-Michael Key, Chukwudi Iwuji, Nat Wolff, Gretchen Mol, Thomas Jane, Tony Shalhoub, and Mark Cuban.

It was released by Amazon MGM Studios via Prime Video on October 1, 2025 and received mixed reviews from critics.

== Plot ==
Professional thieves Parker and Philly lead a heist at a racetrack count room, but an employee kills one of the thieves and wounds Philly, driving away with the stolen money and his family. Parker pursues him onto the racetrack and shoots him dead, bribing his wife and escaping with the score. The thieves are betrayed by getaway driver Zen, who shoots Philly and the others as a wounded Parker falls into a nearby river. Recuperating at a motel, Parker promises Philly's widow Grace to avenge her husband.

With help from fellow thief Grofield, who runs a struggling theatre company, Parker tracks down Zen's associate Reggie, who reveals Zen was a member of a death squad in her home country. Her fellow mercenaries kill Reggie and his driver, but Parker forces the surviving gunman to bring him to Zen. Killing her contact Bosco, Parker confronts Zen, who admits she used the racetrack score to fund a new score: Her country's corrupt President De La Paz has hired a crime syndicate, the Outfit, to steal treasure from a shipwreck De La Paz will be displaying at the UN, in order to sell the $1 billion treasure himself.

Parker and Grofield meet with Zen and her comrades, led by Colonel Ortiz, who plan to seize the treasure on behalf of their fellow citizens. Parker, exiled from New York City by the Outfit's leader Lozini, suggests they steal the treasure once the Outfit has stolen it from the UN. Parker and Zen question Bosco's boyfriend, fighting off the Outfit's men, and Parker drops Lozini's lieutenant Kincaid from a window while retrieving Bosco's plans for the UN robbery, hidden inside a stuffed elephant.

Married thieves Ed and Brenda Mackey and getaway driver Stan Devers are recruited for the heist: The Outfit will transport the stolen treasure by automated garbage train, which Parker's crew will derail. Zen attempts to seduce Parker, but her jealous comrade Mateo delivers him to the Outfit. Mateo is killed instead as Zen rescues Parker, and a phone call from Lozini reveals the Outfit is robbing the UN that night, forcing Parker's crew into action.

Posing as MTA workers, Ed and Brenda subdue the Outfit's inside man and hijack the train's switchboard. A drunk Stan crashes the getaway truck and nearly runs over Grofield, who shoots the failsafe brake, derailing the train. Parker, Zen, and Grofield discover the containers of treasure have been replaced with rocks, and Stan is shot in the leg as they flee in a stolen police car.

The crew turn on Parker for being outsmarted by the Outfit, but he convinces them to go after the shipwreck's figurehead worth $500 million. Grofield poses as a suicidal jumper as he and Parker lure Kincaid's bodyguard to the roof, throwing him to his death, and question the injured Kincaid, whose girlfriend reveals the figurehead is being sold to billionaire Phineas Paul. Parker kidnaps Phineas, shooting Mark Cuban in the process, and learn the figurehead is inside a secure facility in Green Brook Township, New Jersey.

Phineas escapes from an inebriated Stan and warns Lozini, who arrives at the facility just as Parker's crew drive off with the figurehead. The thieves escape in a snowy chase but lose the figurehead, which Phineas discovers is a replica. He informs De La Paz, who assumes Lozini has double-crossed him. Lozini and his men return to the facility, where Parker waited until the time-lock on the real vault opened. Destroying the genuine figurehead with explosives rather than let it fall into the wrong hands, Parker kills Lozini and escapes as De La Paz's guards slaughter the Outfit.

Leaving the crew with valuable jewels he saved from the figurehead, Parker confronts Zen, who suggests he join her for a simpler life in her home country, but Parker kills her to avenge Philly and the others. As Phineas and De La Paz's crimes are made public and Ortiz is named the new president, Parker delivers a share of the jewels to Grace, and he and Grofield return to their lives of crime.

== Cast ==
- Mark Wahlberg as Parker
- LaKeith Stanfield as Grofield
- Rosa Salazar as Zen
- Keegan-Michael Key as Ed Mackey
- Chukwudi Iwuji as Phineas Paul
- Nat Wolff as Kincaid
- Gretchen Mol as Grace Webb
- Thomas Jane as Philly Webb
- Tony Shalhoub as Lozini
- Hemky Madera as Colonel Ortiz
- Alejandro Edda as De La Paz
- Claire Lovering as Brenda Mackey
- Chai Hansen as Stan Devers
- Sebastian Carr as Hothead (Knox)
- Nick Russell as the bank supervisor
- Byron Coll as Joe
- Kat Hoyos as Joe's wife
- Ava Caryofyllis as Joe's daughter
- Michelle Ang as Bett
- Peta Wilson as Madge
- Yvonne Zima as Traci
- Mark Cuban as himself

== Production ==
=== Development ===
Amazon MGM Studios, Team Downey and Shane Black began working together on the project in March 2022, with Black having adapted a script from the Parker novels with Charles Mondry and Anthony Bagarozzi, with Black set as director. Producers include Susan Downey for Team Downey and Marc Toberoff, with Ezra Emanuel as a co-producer. Amazon MGM Studios and Shane Black were working with producer Joel Silver on the project before Silver was replaced by Jules Daly in November 2023. Black repurposed the film's title, Play Dirty, from his unused screenplay for Lethal Weapon 2 (1989).

=== Casting ===
Robert Downey Jr. was attached to the film as an actor prior to Mark Wahlberg's involvement. In January 2024, LaKeith Stanfield joined the cast of the film, portraying Grofield. Rosa Salazar also joined the cast in an undisclosed role. In February, Dermot Mulroney and Tony Shalhoub joined the cast in undisclosed roles. In March, Keegan-Michael Key, Nat Wolff, Chukwudi Iwuji, and Thomas Jane were added to the cast in undisclosed roles. Principal photography began on March 19, 2024, in Sydney Harbour. Filming locations include Ku-ring-gai Council and the Hills District. In April 2025, Saskia Archer revealed she had been cast in the film in an undisclosed role.

=== Music ===
In February 2025, Alan Silvestri was hired to compose the film's score.

== Release ==
The film was released by Amazon MGM Studios through Prime Video on October 1, 2025.

== Reception ==
On the review aggregator website Rotten Tomatoes, 43% of 63 critics' reviews are positive, with an average rating of 5.2/10. The website's consensus reads: "Play Dirty marks a welcome return for writer-director Shane Black to the realm of wisecracking crime thriller, but haphazard execution makes this vehicle less of a comeback and more just low-stakes mucking around." Metacritic, which uses a weighted average, assigned the film a score of 46 out of 100, based on 15 critics, indicating "mixed or average" reviews.

David Rooney for The Hollywood Reporter writes that the film "lacks the spark to sell a sardonic master criminal" and that it was a "ho-hum caper".
