= John Dortmunder =

Fictional criminal created by Donald E. Westlake

- First appearance: The Hot Rock
- Last appearance: Get Real
- Created by: Donald E. Westlake
- Portrayed by: Robert Redford; George C. Scott; Teo Teocoli; Paul Le Mat; Christopher Lambert; Herbert Knaup; Martin Lawrence

In-universe information
- Gender: Male
- Occupation: Criminal
- Nationality: American

John Archibald Dortmunder is a fictional character created by Donald E. Westlake. He is the protagonist of 14 novels and 11 short stories published between 1970 and 2009. He first appeared in the novel The Hot Rock, published in 1970.

Westlake originally intended The Hot Rock to feature his Parker character and to publish it under his Richard Stark pseudonym. However, the plot involves a precious gem that is stolen, lost, reacquired, stolen again, lost again (and so forth), which seemed too comical a situation for a hard-boiled creation like Parker. Westlake therefore rewrote the novel with a more bumbling and likable cast of characters, led by a pessimistic, hard-luck, professional thief. A neon sign for DAB beer, an acronym for "Dortmunder Actien Brauerei", provided the name for the book's new protagonist.

A career criminal and a "planner," creating schemes for burglaries and assigning responsibilities to his team, Dortmunder is similar to Parker in several ways.

He is tall, with stooped shoulders and "lifeless thinning hair-colored hair" and has a disreputable "hangdog" face; he rarely smiles. He shares an apartment in Manhattan on East 19th Street with longtime girlfriend May Bellamy, a supermarket cashier. Unlike Parker, however, Dortmunder is a nonviolent character whose schemes start out fairly straightforward but usually turn out outlandish and over-the-top.

== Character background ==
Very little is known of Dortmunder's childhood. It is mentioned in more than one book that he was abandoned at birth and raised in an orphanage run by the Bleeding Heart Sisters of Eternal Misery in the fictional town of Dead Indian, Illinois.

Dortmunder married a nightclub entertainer whose stage name was "Honeybun Bazoom" shortly before he left the country to serve in Korea in 1952. The marriage took place in San Diego. Upon his return from Korea in 1954, they were divorced in Reno.

Dortmunder has been twice convicted of burglary, serving time in prison. He is completing the final day of his second prison term at the beginning of The Hot Rock. Always hanging over Dortmunder's head is the knowledge that a third conviction will mean that he will be sent to prison for the rest of his life with no chance of parole.

The fact that something almost always goes wrong with Dortmunder's jobs, in spite of careful planning, has given him the reputation of being jinxed. Although he claims not to be superstitious, Dortmunder has believed so, too. In fact, Dortmunder gets worried when things go smoothly and seems relieved when something does go wrong. In most novels, Dortmunder's team earn only small amounts of money; the resulting heists, therefore, are only Pyrrhic victories, and the moral for the reader is that Crime Does Not Pay—at least not very well. However, Dortmunder is not always unlucky, and in some novels and stories he and his crew make out quite well.

Dortmunder has occasionally used the alias "John Diddums", telling anyone who asks that it is Welsh (to which they usually reply "Ah" or "Oh"). He came up with the name on the spur of the moment in the 1989 short story "Too Many Crooks" and dislikes it, but now uses it involuntarily in circumstances that preclude using his real name.

The motto of his family crest (which he admits he stole) is "Quid lucrum istic mihi est?" ("What's in it for me?").

A firm believer that "if you couldn't accomplish a task with five men, you shouldn't try it at all" (What's The Worst That Could Happen?), Dortmunder as a rule never works with more than four other people. However, in What's The Worst That Could Happen?, a job in Las Vegas (robbing a Las Vegas Strip hotel/casino) is so irresistible to other associates that he winds up with a total "crew" of twenty people.

As is common with characters in long-running series, Dortmunder and his companions seem to be more-or-less frozen at the age they were when we first met them. His age is given as 37 in 1970's The Hot Rock, and as 40 in 1977's Nobody's Perfect. Dortmunder appears to be somewhere in his early forties throughout the rest of the series' nearly forty-year run.

== Associates ==
Except in a few short stories, where Dortmunder is working alone, each of Dortmunder's plans calls for a team or "string". Seen most frequently are:

- Andy Kelp: All-purpose crook Andy Kelp (full name Andrew Octavian Kelp) is Dortmunder's best friend (though Dortmunder would be the first to deny this). Cheerful and optimistic where Dortmunder is dour and relentlessly pessimistic, Kelp is boundlessly enthusiastic and full of sometimes questionable ideas. In appearance, he is shorter than Dortmunder, has a pointy nose, birdlike mannerisms, and looks "like a cockney pickpocket" (Nobody's Perfect). An experienced thief, Kelp has a notable penchant for stealing cars with M.D. plates whenever he needs transportation (his reasoning being that doctors have both the money and the ego to provide themselves with the very best, and they often leave the keys in their cars). Kelp also loves to adopt the newest electronic gadgets, generally to Dortmunder's annoyance. Because Kelp brings Dortmunder many eventually unsuccessful jobs (or jobs that promise great payment but which dismally disappoint all members of the string), Dortmunder has been known to call Kelp a jinx; however, Dortmunder is generally loyal to Kelp throughout the series, even if he sometimes finds him exasperating (especially as Kelp has developed the habit of picking the lock on John's apartment door and entering without knocking or ringing the doorbell first). Kelp has an older sister, whose adult son Victor (a former FBI agent who wanted the FBI to have a secret handshake) plays a role in some of the gang's misadventures (Bank Shot and Nobody's Perfect). Although unmarried over the course of the series, Kelp is known to have had at least two prior marriages, presumably dissolved; as of What's The Worst That Could Happen?, he is in a relationship with Anne-Marie Carpinaw (see below).
- Stan Murch: Stocky, red-headed Stan Murch is the gang's usual driver. Genial and uncomplicated, Murch lives in Canarsie with his cab-driver mother (usually referred to as "Murch's Mom" [see below]). Murch's life revolves around cars; he listens to audio recordings of the Indianapolis 500 for relaxation, and virtually every conversation he has includes a detailed account of his most recent trip in his car.

Kelp and Murch are the only regulars to appear in every novel. Kelp also appears in many of the short stories. Over the course of the series, several other regulars are gradually added to the mix, including:

- Tchotchkus "Tiny" Bulcher: Introduced in Nobody's Perfect. A specialist in Thuggery, Tiny is a massive, muscular "man mountain" of Eastern European descent; one of the more interesting descriptions of him is "a medium range intercontinental ballistic missile with legs. Also arms, about the shape of fire hydrants but longer, and a head, about the shape of a fire hydrant." (What's The Worst That Could Happen?). He is used to getting exactly what he wants, and due to his size and physical strength (he has been known to steal cars by merely lifting them onto a flatbed truck), he doesn't have to ask for it twice. He often tells stories about past crimes that have gone wrong and the dire retribution he has administered to his accomplices if they were to blame for the failed scheme. He generally finds Dortmunder and his cronies amusing –much to their relief.
- Rollo: The bartender at the O.J. Bar and Grill on Amsterdam Avenue, the favorite hangout and meeting place for Dortmunder and his people. He remembers all of his customers by their drinking preferences, even when the customer hasn't set foot inside the bar for years, and usually refers to his customers by their drinks. He willingly turns a blind eye to what goes on in the bar's back room, but makes sure that there's no trouble in the main room. He runs the bar for the real owner, who has retired to Florida, and keeps him informed of how things are going.
- Arnie Albright: Dortmunder's usual fence. Arnie lives alone in a squalid apartment on the Upper West Side and collects calendars. His appearance and behavior repulse every character he encounters, but he is fully aware of this and compensates by offering better terms than his competitors. Even Dortmunder can't always stand dealing with Arnie, and from time to time he goes to another fence named "Stoon" (actual name not currently known).
- Judson "The Kid" Blint: Introduced in Watch Your Back. A graduate of both high school and J. C. Taylor's (see below) detective course, Judson arrived unannounced at her offices looking for a job. J. C. immediately saw through him and his fake résumé, but sensed his potential and hired him as her assistant to take over the day-to-day running of her mail-order scams. He originally joined Dortmunder's gang as something of a mascot/protégé, but by the time of Get Real he has been accepted as one of them (even if he hasn't yet settled on what he drinks at the OJ).
- Max: Proprietor of Maximillian's Used Cars. Max is a stereotypically dishonest used car dealer who is perennially unhappy with the state of his business. When Stan Murch or others in the gang want to dispose of vehicles they have stolen in exchange for some quick cash, Max is usually the buyer.

Several other specialists appear less frequently in the series, such as Ralph Winslow, a lockman; Wally Whistler, an extremely absentminded lockman who once accidentally released a lion from its cage at the zoo; Jim O'Hara, a recently released burglar who still hasn't lost his prison pallor, and Herman Jones, a black lockman formerly known as "Herman X" when he was a black radical and as "Herman Makanene Stulu'mbnick" when he was briefly Vice-President of the fictional African nation of Talabwo. Other memorable characters include Wilbur Howey, a lockman recently released after a forty-eight-year sentence (originally ten years, but he kept escaping and getting caught immediately); Roger Chefwick, a lockman who is crazy about model trains; and Fred and Thelma Lartz, a husband-wife driving team (Thelma now does the actual driving because Fred has lost his nerve after nearly being run down by an Eastern Airlines flight on a Kennedy Airport runway).

Also of note are the various wives, girlfriends and female family members of the regulars, who often find their way into the plots. These regulars are sometimes employed directly in the gang's criminal enterprises, sometimes they are not. But they are all seen frequently, and could certainly be accused of aiding and abetting Dortmunder and his cronies in all their endeavors:

- May Bellamy: Dortmunder's longstanding live-in girlfriend, introduced in Bank Shot, the second novel. She is a supermarket cashier, initially at Bohack's, in later books at Safeway. They met when she caught Dortmunder shoplifting. She is thin and dark-haired. Originally a chain-smoker, she gives it up in later novels, resorting to fake-smoking. She is usually more optimistic than Dortmunder, which isn't hard, and she can keep him from becoming discouraged. During lean times, she keeps the two of in them in groceries by stealing from whichever store she is working in at the moment.
- Josephine Carol "J.C." Taylor: Introduced in Good Behavior. Known as "J.C.", she is a sexy, tough businesswoman who runs several shady mail order enterprises, including a detective course; a song poem service; and her best-selling product by far: a profusely illustrated “educational” sex manual in which Josie herself is the primary female model. Beginning in Watch Your Back, she delegates the day-to-day operations of these scams to Judson Blint in order to focus her attention on Maylohda, a nonexistent country she created in order to receive economic development aid. She is Commercial Attaché for Maylodah (“mail order" in a New York accent). She is Tiny's girlfriend, and only Tiny calls her "Josie".
- Anne-Marie Carpinaw: Introduced in What's The Worst That Could Happen?. A congressman's daughter from the Midwest, abandoned in New York City by her husband. She became Andy Kelp's girlfriend after meeting him in a hotel bar and then becoming involved with him in the course of Dortmunder's vengeful pursuit of Max Fairbanks. She moved in with Andy and accepts his unusual lifestyle.
- Gladys Murch: Almost always referred to as "Murch's Mom", a temperamental cabdriver, usually out for a quick buck. Her first name is revealed in Drowned Hopes.

When planning their heists, the group usually meets in the back room of the O.J. Bar and Grill, at a circular table. Whoever gets there first gets the chair facing the door: Tiny is the only one who doesn't mind sitting with his back to the door. At these meetings, Andy and Dortmunder drink Amsterdam Liquor Store Bourbon, labeled "Our Own Brand", over ice; Murch drinks beer and salt due to his status as a driver (he prefers to nurse one beer, and the salt restores the head on it); Ralph Winslow drinks rye and water with many ice-cubes, which he keeps clinking; Tiny drinks a tincture of red wine and vodka, described as looking like "flat cherry soda". Scenes set in the public areas of the O.J. usually involve the unnamed regulars at the bar, who provide comic relief by engaging in heated arguments on various topics of which they are ignorant.

== Significant items stolen by Dortmunder ==
- The Balabomo Emerald (The Hot Rock)
- The Capitalists' & Immigrants' Trust Bank (Bank Shot)
- The Byzantine Fire (a ruby) (Why Me?)
- The Femur of St. Ferghana (Don't Ask)
- The body of a 70-years-dead Native American (Bad News)
- Strands of Viveca Quinlan's hair (Bad News)
- A gold chess set originally intended as a gift for Czar Nicholas II (What's So Funny?)
- A bronze casting of a Rodin statue (short story 'Ask A Silly Question')

== Successful robberies committed by Dortmunder and his crew ==
- various valuable objects, including jewelry, rare coins/stamps and jade, from Avalon State Bank Tower (Good Behavior)
- various valuable objects, including silver and a Lexus sedan, from Max Fairbank's Carrport house (What's The Worst That Could Happen?)
- various valuable objects, including artwork and jewelry, from Max Fairbank's New York City apartment (What's The Worst That Could Happen?)
- $50,000 in illegal Political Action Committee money at the Watergate Hotel, Washington, D.C. (What's The Worst That Could Happen?)
- $2,000,000, possibly more, from The Gaiety Hotel and Casino, Las Vegas, NV (What's The Worst That Could Happen?)
- various valuable items from the Thurstead estate (Bad News)
- various valuable trinkets from Preston Fareweather's duplex penthouse (Watch Your Back!)
- $162,450 in cash from Combined Tool (Get Real)
- undisclosed amount from bank vault (short story 'Too Many Crooks')

== Appearances ==
=== Novels ===
- The Hot Rock. New York: Simon and Schuster, 1970. ISBN 978-0671205416
- Bank Shot. New York: Simon and Schuster, 1972. ISBN 978-0671211806
- Jimmy the Kid. New York: M. Evans, 1974. ISBN 978-0871311573
- Nobody's Perfect. New York: M. Evans, 1977. ISBN 9780871312495
- Why Me? New York: Viking, 1983. ISBN 0-670-76569-4.
- Good Behavior. New York: Mysterious Press, 1985. ISBN 0-892-96240-2.
- Drowned Hopes. New York: Mysterious Press, 1990. ISBN 0-892-96178-3.
- Don't Ask. New York: Mysterious Press, 1993. ISBN 0-892-96469-3.
- What's the Worst That Could Happen? New York: Mysterious Press, 1996. ISBN 0-892-96586-X.
- Bad News. New York: Mysterious Press, 2001. ISBN 0-892-96717-X.
- The Road to Ruin. New York: Mysterious Press, 2004. ISBN 0-892-96801-X.
- Watch Your Back! New York: Mysterious Press, 2005. ISBN 0-892-96802-8.
- What's So Funny? New York: Warner Books, 2007. ISBN 0-446-58240-9.
- Get Real. New York: Grand Central Pub., 2009. ISBN 9780446178600.

All of the above novels have been recorded as either abridged or unabridged audio-books, though some may no longer be commercially available.

=== Shorter Works ===
- "Art & Craft" (2000), a short story published in Playboy.
- Thieves' Dozen (2004), a collection of ten Dortmunder short stories and one related story.
- "Walking Around Money" (2005), a novella in the anthology Transgressions, edited by Ed McBain.

=== Films ===
- The Hot Rock (1972) starring Robert Redford as Dortmunder.
- Bank Shot (1974) starring George C. Scott as Dortmunder, renamed "Walter Upjohn Ballentine"
- Come ti rapisco il pupo (1976), based on Jimmy the Kid, starring Teo Teocoli as the Dortmunder character, (renamed "Elia")
- Jimmy the Kid (1982) starring Gary Coleman as Jimmy, and Paul Le Mat as Dortmunder
- Why Me? (1990) starring Christopher Lambert as Dortmunder, renamed "Gus Cardinale"
- Jimmy the Kid (1999) a German film starring Herbert Knaup as Dortmunder
- What's the Worst That Could Happen? (2001) starring Martin Lawrence as Dortmunder, renamed "Kevin Caffery", and Danny DeVito.

=== Radio ===
- The short story "Too Many Crooks" was adapted for radio by Ed Thomason and directed by Andy Jordan. It was broadcast on BBC Radio 4 on 17 December 1996, with William Hope as Dortmunder and Andy Lucas as Kelp.

== In popular culture ==
- On the 2002 science-fiction television series Firefly, which is set in the year 2517, an Alliance Capital Cruiser space combat ship is named IAV Dortmunder. This may be a reference to the fact that the main cast consists of thieves and crooks.
- In Spider Robinson's book Lady Slings the Booze (1992), the hero takes out a copy of Good Behavior and reads several chapters.
