= Alan Balsam =

American film editor

Alan Howard Balsam (2 April 1950 – 13 November 1992) was an American film editor.

== Early life and education ==
Alan Balsam was born in Los Angeles. He attended California State University.

== Career ==
Balsam began his career editing short commercials and films, before working as an assistant editor on the TV documentary Heroes of Rock and Roll in 1979. A year later, he took on his first solo editing project with the comedy Loose Shoes, which featured Bill Murray in a supporting role. He went on to edit comedies such as Revenge of the Nerds, One Crazy Summer and Moving in Reverse.

Balsam died from AIDS on November 13, 1992. His partner, Stephen Schneider, subsequently founded the Alan Balsam Fund, which focused on facilitating the exchange of experiences among those affected by AIDS.

== Filmography ==
- 1979: Heroes of Rock and Roll
- 1980: Loose Shoes
- 1981: Dead & Buried
- 1983: To Be or Not to Be
- 1984: Revenge of the Nerds
- 1985: Better Off Dead
- 1986: One Crazy Summer
- 1988: Doin' Time on Planet Earth
- 1988: Moving
- 1989: Harlem Nights
- 1990: Why Me?
- 1991: Born to Ride
- 1992: A League of Their Own
- 1994: Car 54, Where Are You?
