= Dyson tree =

Hypothetical genetically-engineered plant capable of growing inside a comet

External image
- Artist's concept of a spherical Dyson tree

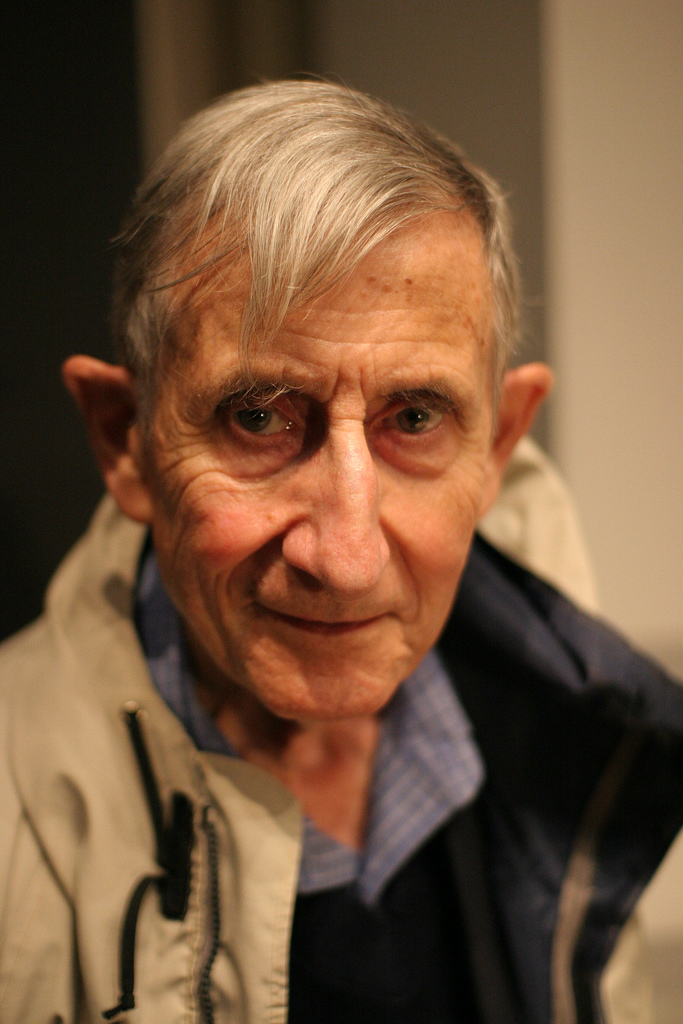
Freeman Dyson in 2005

A Dyson tree is a hypothetical genetically engineered plant (perhaps resembling a tree) capable of growing inside a comet, suggested by the physicist Freeman Dyson. Plants may be able to produce a breathable atmosphere within the hollow spaces of the comet (or maybe even within the plants themselves), utilising solar energy for photosynthesis and cometary materials for nutrients, thus providing self-sustaining habitats for humanity in the outer solar system analogous to a greenhouse in space, a shell grown by a mollusc or the actions of thermogenic plants, such as the skunk cabbage or the voodoo lily.

A Dyson tree might consist of a few main trunk structures growing out from a comet nucleus, branching into limbs and foliage that intertwine, forming a spherical structure possibly dozens of kilometers across.

== In science fiction ==
Dyson trees are mentioned a number of times in science fiction, beginning in the 1980s:

- One of the first adoptions of the trope is Rachel Pollack's Tree House (1984).
- The titular megaflora in Larry Niven's 1984 novel The Integral Trees exist within an orbiting gaseous torus full of life adapted to free-fall.
- The concept is discussed in Carl Sagan and Ann Druyan's 1985 non-fiction book Comet, and several paintings of Dyson trees around Saturn and in interstellar space are provided in the book by Jon Lomberg.
- In Michael Swanwick's 1987 transhumanist novel Vacuum Flowers, "dysonsworlders" have established tree settlements in the Oort Cloud.
- Under the name of "Space Poplars", Dyson trees are described in Donald Moffitt's two science fiction novels, The Genesis Quest and Second Genesis. Here they are used as both habitats and spacecraft, propelled by reflective outer leaves used as organic solar sails.
- Dan Simmons, in Endymion (1996) and the Rise of Endymion (1997) – both part of his Hyperion Cantos – refers to Dyson trees, and in the latter novel to a huge tree system that surrounds an entire star (reminiscent of a Dyson sphere).
- In Stephen Baxter's Manifold: Space (2001), Baxter's protagonist Reid Malenfant at one point finds himself inside a Dyson tree.
- In the Orion's Arm shared universe (established 2000), Dyson trees and Dyson tree "forests" are called orwoods; these have been established in a number of star systems throughout terragen space. The word "Orwood" in this context was originally coined by Anders Sandberg.
- The Transhuman Space roleplaying game includes the beginning of a Dyson tree endeavour on Yggdrasil Station.
- Eclipse Phase Second Edition role-playing game references the Dyson tree as an example of a Biological Habitat.
- In the Tenchi Muyo! OVA series, the Jurai utilize trees that can live in space as ships, and in the temple of the goddess-like character Tokimi, a giant tree whose roots encompass a planet can be seen.
- In The Dirty Pair series, the episode "Run From the Future" is set on the Nimkasi habitat, an outlaw habitat that is a Dyson tree.
- The video game Eufloria is based on the Dyson tree concept.

== See also ==
- Bioship – Type of fictional spacecraft or starship made of biological elements
- Dyson sphere – Hypothetical megastructure around a star
