= Pussycat (comics) =

American comic strip character

- The Adventures of Pussycat #1 (on-sale date: July 2, 1968) cover, art by Bill Everett

Publication information
- Publisher: Magazine Management Company; Marvel Comics
- First appearance: Male Annual #3 (1965)

In-story information
- Species: Human
- Place of origin: Earth
- Team affiliations: S.C.O.R.E.
The Adventures of Pussycat
Publication information
- Format: One-shot magazine
- Genre: Humor
- Publication date: October 1968
- No. of issues: 1

Pussycat is a fictional comic book character who originally appeared in black-and-white strips printed in men's magazines published by Magazine Management Company between 1965 and 1972. During this period Martin Goodman was publisher for both Magazine Management and Marvel Comics; as a result in 1968 a magazine format compilation of Pussycat's adventures was published as a one-off title, The Adventures of Pussycat.

The stories revolved around innuendo and other risqué humour, though they featured scant nudity. Due to the relationship between Magazine Management and Marvel, the stories featured contributions from several creators known for their work on the latter's range of all-ages comics — including Stan Lee, Jim Mooney, Al Hartley, Larry Lieber and Ernie Hart — as well as EC Comics legend Wally Wood and "good girl art" cartoonist Bill Ward.

== Creation ==
Harvey Kurtzman and Will Elder had launched Little Annie Fanny in Playboy magazine in 1962, and the strip's success led to a spate of imitators in rival men's magazines. As of 2024 the original creators of Pussycat and the exact appearances of the feature have yet to be definitively identified due to incomplete record-keeping and inconsistent attribution, Although the first episode was drawn by Wally Wood. he would later create his own nudie cutie-style comic, Sally Forth, in 1968. Jim Mooney recalled in 2000, "[I]n the early '70s, I did work for Goodman's men's magazines, a strip called 'Pussycat'. Stan [Lee] wrote the first one I did, and then his brother Larry [Lieber] wrote the ones that came later".

While Pussycat eschewed outright nudity it followed much of the Little Annie Fanny template, also centring on a kind, buxom and oblivious blonde who ends up undressed in front of gawping males, but usually ends up successfully completing her objective despite — or even because of — her complete lack of awareness of the situation around her. However, unlike Annie's everywoman tour of American culture, Pussycat's adventures were linked to another fad of the period, the spy genre. Her employers S.C.O.R.E. and their enemies L.U.S.T. were reminiscent of U.N.C.L.E. and T.H.R.U.S.H. from the smash-hit television series The Man from U.N.C.L.E..

== Publication history ==
After debuting in Male Annual #3 in 1965, Pussycat's exploits appeared in many of Goodman's other men's magazines, including Stag and Men. In 1968 nine Pussycat strips were packaged in a Marvel one-shot called The Adventures of Pussycat, following the same magazine-black-and-white format as that recently used for The Spectacular Spider-Man. As a magazine, the title was not covered by the Comics Code Authority, a loophole that was being successfully exploited by Warren Publishing and would later be more extensively explored by Marvel in a mid-1970s spate of horror titles. Eight of the strips in The Adventures of Pussycat had previously been printed in Goodman's magazine; the ninth was a new story by Lieber and Mooney. It also included a centerfold by Bill Everett, featuring a nude but tastefully obscured Pussycat. The title was intended to be a quarterly to periodically compile the ongoing men's magazine strips, but only a single issue was published.

While original material ended in 1972 the strips continued to be reprinted as filler in other Goodman titles under the Humorama banner.

== Plot ==
Pussycat is a secretary for S.C.O.R.E. (Secret Council of Ruthless Extroverts), and is recruited to fight the agency's archenemies, L.U.S.T. (Legion of Unsuitable Sinister Types). Despite her lack of experience, intelligence, and situational awareness, Pussycat is usually successful in her missions due to her figure and frequent wardrobe malfunctions distracting the enemy. She later changed careers to become an investigative reporter, with identical results.

== Strips ==
Date	Magazine	Title	Creators	Notes
1965	Male Annual #3	"The Mirthful Misadventures of a Merry, Mixed-Up Miss!"	Wally Wood (artist)	Reprinted in The Adventures of Pussycat
1966	Stag Annual #3	"The Mirthful Misadventures of a Naughty Nonsensical Nymphet!"	Al Hartley (artist)	Reprinted in The Adventures of Pussycat
1966	Male Annual #4	"The Madly Mirthful Misadventures of a Lively Little Lass"	Bill Ward (artist)	Reprinted in The Adventures of Pussycat
1967	Stag Annual #4	"The Cool and Carefree Capers of a Curvy Cuddly Chick"	Bill Ward (artist)	Reprinted in The Adventures of Pussycat.
1967	Male Annual #5	"The Cavortin' Case of The Booby-Trapped Bra"	Bill Ward (artist)	Reprinted in The Adventures of Pussycat, Stag Annual #7 (May 1970); Cartoon Capers vol. 5, #3 (June 1970); Popular Cartoons vol. 12, #50 (April 1980)
March 1968	Male vol. 18, #3	"The Mischievous Memoirs of a Merry Little Miss!"	Jim Mooney (artist)	
April 1968	Male vol. 18, #4	"The Capricious Capers of a Curvy Cutie-Pie!"	Bill Ward (artist)	
May 1968	Male vol. 18, #5	"The Sizzlin' Saga of a Secret-Agent Swinger"		
June 1968		"The Pin-Up Calendar Caper: The Mirthful Misadventures of a Most Magnificently Proportioned Miss"	Jim Mooney (artist)	
July 1968		"America's Favorite Dynamite Blonde"	Jim Mooney (artist)	
August 1968		"The Crazy Case of the Crazy Cases!"		
September 1968	Male vol. 18, #9	"The Computer and the Cutie"	Jim Mooney (artist)	
September 1968		"The Mixed-Up Model"	Jim Mooney (artist)	
October 1968	The Adventures of Pussycat #1	"The Hidden Hippie Caper"	Jim Mooney (artist)	Reprinted in Cartoon Laughs vol. 9, #4 (July 1970): Cartoon Capers vol. 6, #4 (Sept. 1971); Popular Jokes vol. 15, #73 (Nov. 1979); Popular Jokes vol. 15, #78 (Feb. 1981)
November 1968		"Peach on a Beach"		Reprinted in Cartoons and Gags vol. 18, #2 (May 1971); Cartoon Laughs vol. 12, #1 (Feb. 1973); Cartoons and Gags vol. 21, #1 (Jan. 1974)
December 1968		"Frenzy In France"		
1968	Stag Annual #5	"Damsel in Disguise"	Bill Ward (artist)	Reprinted in The Adventures of Pussycat, Cartoons and Gags vol. 16, #6 (Dec. 1969); Cartoon Fun and Comedy vol. 15, #99 (Jan. 1981)
1968	Men Annual #2	"Another Capricious Caper of the Country's Most Cataclysmically Cuddlesome Curvaceous Cutie"	Bill Ward (artist)	Reprinted in The Adventures of Pussycat, Cartoon Laughs vol. 9, #1 (Jan. 1970); Cartoon Fun and Comedy vol. 15, #98 (Oct. 1980)
1968	Men Annual #1	"The Madly Mirthful Misadventures of a Most Generously Endowed Modern Miss"	Bill Ward (artist)	Reprinted in The Adventures of Pussycat, Laugh Parade vol. 10, #1 (Jan. 1970)
1968	Male Annual #6	"The Bombshell and the Bank!"		
February 1969		"The Spaceman and the Sweetie"		
March 1969		"The Castaway Cutie"	Jim Mooney (artist)	
April 1969		"The Lady on the Late Show!"		
May 1969		"My Album"	Jim Mooney (artist)	
June 1969		"How Groovy Is My Movie"	Jim Mooney (artist)	
July 1969		"The Kid Flips Her Id!"		Reprinted in Cartoon Capers vol. 8, #3 (May 1973)
August 1969		"It's a Gass Lass"		Reprinted in Cartoon Capers vol. 5, #2 (April 1970); Laugh Parade vol. 10, #6 (Nov. 1970); Cartoon Capers vol. 6, #2 (May 1971); Laugh Parade vol. 11, #5 (Oct. 1971); Cartoons and Gags vol. 20, #2 (March 1973); Cartoon Capers vol. 9, #2 (March 1974); Laugh Parade vol. 14, #6 (Dec. 1974); Fun House vol. 20, #8 (May 1979)
September 1969	Men vol. 18, #9	"The Lady Is a Star"	Jim Mooney (artist)	
October 1969		"The Gal Gets Her Goal!"	Reprinted in Male Annual #8 (June 1970)	
November 1969		"For Better or For Nurse"		
December 1969		"The Joke's on Her"		Reprinted in Cartoons and Gags vol. 17, #2 (April 1970)
1969	Stag Annual #6	"Look Ma... I'm Flyin'"		
1969	Men Annual #3	"The Swingin' Statue!"		
1969	Male Annual #7	"The Newest Misadventure of our Cuddly Little Cutie"	Jim Mooney (artist)	Reprinted in Stag Annual (1971)
January 1970		"'Twas the Night Before Xmas..."		
February 1970		"Her Wild, Wild Wheels!"		Reprinted in Cartoon Capers (Oct. 1970); Cartoon & Gags (May 1973); Laugh Parade (April 1974); Best Cartoons (Feb. 1975); Popular Cartoons (Jan. 1977)
March 1970		"Two Weeks with Play"	Jim Mooney (artist)	Reprinted in Stag Annual (July 1970); Laugh Parade vol. 10, #4 (July 1970); Cartoon Capers vol. 5, #6 (Nov. 1970); Laugh Parade vol. 11, #3 (June 1971); Cartoons and Gags vol. 18, #5 (Nov. 1971); Cartoon Capers vol. 7, #4 (July 1972); Laugh Parade vol. 13, #4 (Aug. 1973); Cartoon Capers vol. 10, #2 (March 1975); Fun House vol. 21, #9 (Aug. 1979)
April 1970		"Pandemonium at the Company Picnic"		Reprinted in Cartoons and Gags vol. 17, #4 (1970)
May 1970		"Why The West Was Wild"		Reprinted in Male Annual #11 (1970)
July 1970		"--But Don't Go Near the Water!"		Reprinted in Cartoons and Gags vol. 18, #4 (Sept. 1971)
August 1970		"She Makes It with the Mafia!"		
September 1970		"The Hostess with the Mostest"		Reprinted in Stag Annual #12 (1972); Best Cartoons from the Editors of Male & Stag vol. 4, #4 (July 1973)
October 1970		"She's Out In Front!"		Reprinted in Male Annual #16 (1973)
November 1970		"No News Is Good Nudes!"	Jim Mooney (artist)	Reprinted in Male vol. 21, #6 (1971); Popular Cartoons vol. 12, #55 (Oct. 1980)
December 1970		"Temptress in a Taxi! ...Or, Caught with Her Flag Down!"	Larry Lieber (writer); Jim Mooney (artist)	
1970	Men Annual #4	"It Happened in Paris: The Crazy Capers of Our Curviest Chick"		Reprinted in For Men Only Annual vol. 17, #6 (1970)
February 1971		"Circus Siren ... or The Biggest Top of Them All!"	Larry Lieber (writer), Jim Mooney (artist)	Reprinted in Cartoons and Gags vol. 19, #6 (Nov. 1972); Best Cartoons from the Editors of Male & Stag
March 1971		"Bust Out at the Big House"	Larry Lieber (writer), Jim Mooney (artist)	Reprinted in Cartoon Laughs vol. 10, #6 (Dec. 1971); Cartoon Laughs vol. 12, #4 (Aug. 1973); Cartoon Capers vol. 9, #5 (Sept. 1974)
April 1971		"A Racey Tale"	Larry Lieber (writer), Jim Mooney (artist)	Reprinted in Men Annual #13 (1972)
May 1971		"Hijack Havoc! or... Foiled in the Fuselage!"		Reprinted in Male Annual #13 (Nov. 1971)
June 1971		"Scandinavian Sex Plot		Reprinted in Popular Cartoons vol. 10, #39 (April 1977)
July 1971		"Maid in Paris! ...or, The Hottest Jewels In Town!"	Larry Lieber (writer); Jim Mooney (artist)	
August 1971		"Venus and Venice"		
September 1971		"My Fair Fraulein!"	Larry Lieber (writer); Jim Mooney (artist)	Reprinted in Best Cartoons (Male & Stag) vol. 3, #1 (Jan. 1972)
October 1971		"High Voltage! or ... I Get a Charge Out of You!"	Larry Lieber (writer); Jim Mooney (artist)	Reprinted in Stag Annual #15 (1973); Cartoons and Gags vol. 19, #4 (July 1972); Popular Cartoons vol. 10, #38 (July 1972); Cartoon Capers vol. 8, #5 (Sept. 1973)
November 1971		"I, A Spy!"		Reprinted in Cartoon Laughs vol. 13, #2 (April 1974)
December 1971		"Crime and Lusciousment"		
1971		"Sex and the Single Spy!"	Larry Lieber (writer), Jim Mooney (artist)	Reprinted in Best Cartoons from the Editors of Male & Stag
January 1972	Men vol. 21, #1	"A Two-Round Knockout! (or Saved by the Belle!)"	Larry Lieber (writer), Jim Mooney (artist)	Reprinted in Laugh Parade vol. 12, #3 (1972)
February 1972	Men vol. 21, #2	"Cycle Siren, or, Hand Me That Wench!"	Larry Lieber (writer), Jim Mooney (artist)	Reprinted in Best Cartoons (For Men Only) #1 (1974)
March 1972		"The Sexpot and the Sultan"		
April 1972		"Bullets, Boodles, and Broads!"	Larry Lieber (writer), Jim Mooney (artist)	Reprinted in Best Cartoons from the Editors of Male & Stag vol. 4, #1 (Jan. 1973)
May 1972		"Vegas Vixen! or ... The Gal with the Winning Pair"	Larry Lieber (writer), Jim Mooney (artist)	Reprinted in Cartoons and Gags vol. 20, #1
June 1972		"The Phantom of the Uproar!"		
July 1972		"Mobster Mayhem! or, The Most Chased Girl In Town!"		Reprinted in Best Cartoons (Male & Stag) vol. 5, #6 (Dec 1974)
August 1972		"Maid on a Mountain, or Dig Those Peaks!"		Reprinted in Laugh Parade (Dec. 1972); Cartoons and Gag (Aug. 1973); Laugh Parade (June 1974); Best Cartoons (Male & Stag) vol. 6, #3 (April 1975); Popular Cartoons (July 1977); Fun House (Aug. 1981)

== Reception ==
The unlikely combination of Marvel Comics and a bawdy strip has led to periodic rediscovery of Pussycat by comics fans. In 1989 Amazing Heroes writer Steven Paul Thompson penned a three-page article on the character, describing it as "a fascinating footnote to Marvel history" and noting it as a relic of a time when men's magazines largely focused on lurid text fiction and "two or three T&A pictorials", rather than the explicit material in more modern men's magazines. Thompson noted Little Annie Fanny's influence on Pussycat, while also noting its lineage from Bill Ward's Torchy and Milton Caniff's Male Call. He also noted that the stories depended as much on sight gags as titillation, and felt the style was closer to Marvel's all-ages comedy series Not Brand Echh.

In 2005, Marvel cartoonist and fan Fred Hembeck covered the strip in his column for IGN, recalling his attempts to find a copy of the obscure Adventures of Pussycat, and he felt the title was dated but light-hearted, calling for Marvel to print Essential Pussycat. The article caught the attention of writer-artist Mark Evanier, who speculated Hembeck would find a way to "put her in the Avengers".
