= Second Genesis =

Second Genesis may refer to:

- Second Genesis (novel), a 1986 science fiction novel by Donald Moffitt
- Second Genesis (album), a 1974 album by Wayne Shorter
