= Espionage =

Clandestine acquisition of confidential information

Espionage, spying, or intelligence gathering, as a subfield of the intelligence field, is the act of obtaining secret, confidential, or in some way valuable information. Such information is also referred to as intelligence. A professional trained in conducting intelligence operations by their government may be employed as an intelligence officer. Espionage may be conducted in a foreign country, domestically or remotely. The practice is clandestine, as it is by definition unwelcome. In some circumstances, it may be a legal tool of law enforcement and in others, it may be illegal and punishable by law.

Espionage is often part of an institutional effort by a government or commercial concern. The term is frequently associated with state spying on potential or actual enemies for military purposes. However, there are many types of espionage. Industrial espionage, for example, involves spying on civilians and their respective business or corporate interests.

One way spies gather data and information about a targeted military organization is by infiltrating its ranks. They can then return information such as the size and strength of the enemy forces. They can also find collaborators and dissidents within the organization and influence them to provide further information or defect. Spies can steal technology and sabotage the enemy in various ways. Counterespionage, also known as counterintelligence or offensive counterintelligence, is the practice of thwarting enemy espionage and intelligence gathering. Almost all sovereign states have laws concerning espionage and the penalties for being caught spying are often severe.

== History ==
=== Ancient history ===
Espionage has been recognized as of importance in military affairs since ancient times. The oldest known classified document was a report made by a spy disguised as a diplomatic envoy in the court of King Hammurabi, who died in or around 1750 BC. The ancient Egyptians had a developed secret service, and espionage is mentioned in the Iliad, the Bible, and the Amarna letters. Espionage was also prevalent in the Greco-Roman world, when spies employed illiterate subjects in civil services.

The thesis that espionage and intelligence has a central role in war as well as peace was first advanced in The Art of War and in the Arthashastra. "The Art of War," identifies five types of spies that are essential for gathering intelligence and achieving victory: local spies (citizen informants within the enemy's territory), inward spies (recruited double agents within the enemy ranks), converted spies (recruited defectors converted to serve your side), doomed spies (expendable fabricators used to spread disinformation; acts as decoy for counter-intelligence), and surviving spies (spies that provide accurate intelligence after gathering information from the enemy).

=== Post-classical history ===
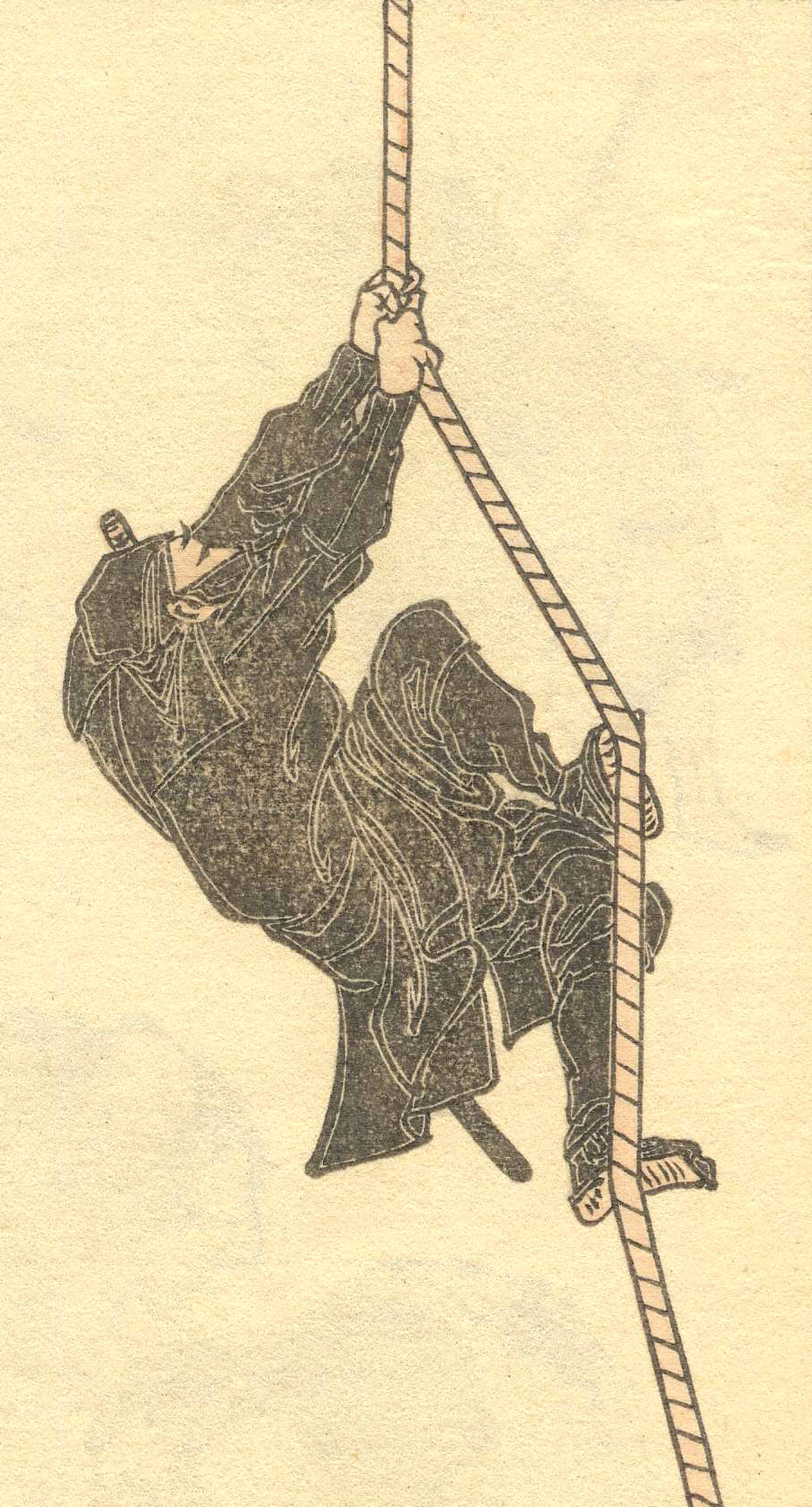
Japanese ninja were traditionally associated with espionage.

==== Europe ====
In the Middle Ages, European states excelled at what has later been termed counter-subversion when Catholic inquisitions were staged to annihilate heresy. Inquisitions were marked by centrally organised mass interrogations and detailed record keeping. Western espionage changed fundamentally during the Renaissance when Italian city-states installed resident ambassadors in capital cities to collect intelligence.

===== Renaissance =====
Renaissance Venice became so obsessed with espionage that the Council of Ten, which was nominally responsible for security, did not even allow the doge to consult government archives freely. In 1481 the Council of Ten barred all Venetian government officials from making contact with ambassadors or foreigners. Those revealing official secrets could face the death penalty. Venice became obsessed with espionage because successful international trade demanded that the city-state could protect its trade secrets.

Under Queen Elizabeth I of England (r. 1558–1603), Francis Walsingham (c. 1532–1590) was appointed foreign secretary and intelligence chief. The novelist and journalist Daniel Defoe (died 1731) not only spied for the British government, but also developed a theory of espionage foreshadowing modern police-state methods.

=== Modern history ===
==== United States ====
During the American Revolutionary War, Nathan Hale and Benedict Arnold achieved their fame as spies, and there was considerable use of spies on both sides during the American Civil War. Though not a spy himself, George Washington was America's first spymaster, utilizing espionage tactics against the British.

==== 21st century ====
Today, spy agencies target the illegal drug trade and terrorists as well as state actors.

Intelligence services value certain intelligence collection techniques over others. The former Soviet Union, for example, preferred human sources over research in open sources, while the United States has tended to emphasize technological methods such as SIGINT and IMINT. In the Soviet Union, both political (KGB) and military intelligence (GRU) officers were judged by the number of agents they recruited.

== Targets of espionage ==
Espionage agents are usually trained experts in a targeted field so they can differentiate mundane information from targets of value to their own organizational development. Correct identification of the target at its execution is the sole purpose of the espionage operation.

Broad areas of espionage targeting expertise include:

- Natural resources: strategic production identification and assessment (food, energy, materials). Agents are usually found among bureaucrats who administer these resources in their own countries
- Popular sentiment towards domestic and foreign policies (popular, middle class, elites). Agents often recruited from field journalistic crews, exchange postgraduate students and sociology researchers
- Strategic economic strengths (production, research, manufacture, infrastructure). Agents recruited from science and technology academia, commercial enterprises, and more rarely from among military technologists
- Military capability intelligence (offensive, defensive, manoeuvre, naval, air, space). Agents are trained by military espionage education facilities and posted to an area of operation with covert identities to minimize prosecution
- Counterintelligence operations targeting opponent's intelligence services themselves, such as breaching the confidentiality of communications and recruiting defectors or moles

== Methods and terminology ==
=== How the United States defines espionage ===
Although the news media may speak of "spy satellites" and the like, espionage is not a synonym for all intelligence-gathering disciplines. It is a specific form of human source intelligence (HUMINT). Codebreaking (cryptanalysis or COMINT), aircraft or satellite photography (IMINT), and analysis of publicly available data sources (OSINT) are all intelligence gathering disciplines, but none of them are considered espionage. Many HUMINT activities, such as prisoner interrogation, reports from military reconnaissance patrols and from diplomats, etc., are not considered espionage. Espionage is the disclosure of sensitive information (classified) to people who are not cleared for that information or access to that sensitive information.

Unlike other forms of intelligence collection disciplines, espionage usually involves accessing the place where the desired information is stored or accessing the people who know the information and will divulge it through some kind of subterfuge. There are exceptions to physical meetings, such as the Oslo Report, or the insistence of Robert Hanssen in never meeting the people who bought his information.

The US defines espionage towards itself as "the act of obtaining, delivering, transmitting, communicating, or receiving information about the national defence with an intent, or reason to believe, that the information may be used to the injury of the United States or to the advantage of any foreign nation". Black's Law Dictionary (1990) defines espionage as: "... gathering, transmitting, or losing ... information related to the national defense". Espionage is a violation of United States law, 18 U.S.C. §§ 792–798 and Article 106a of the Uniform Code of Military Justice. The United States, like most nations, conducts espionage against other nations, under the control of the National Clandestine Service.

Britain's espionage activities are controlled by the Secret Intelligence Service.

=== Technology and techniques ===
- Agent handling
- Biographic leverage
- Concealment device
- Covert agent
- Covert listening device
- Cut-out
- Cyber spying
- Dead drop
- False flag operations
- Front organisation
- Gate-crashing
- Human intelligence (HUMINT)
- Honeypot
- Impersonation
- Impostor
- Interrogation
- Non-official cover
- Numbers messaging
- Official cover
- Open-source intelligence (OSINT)
- One-way voice link
- Sabotage
- Safe house
- Side channel attack
- Signals intelligence (SIGINT)
- Spy ship
- Steganography
- Surveillance
- Surveillance aircraft
- Surveillance balloon

== Organization ==
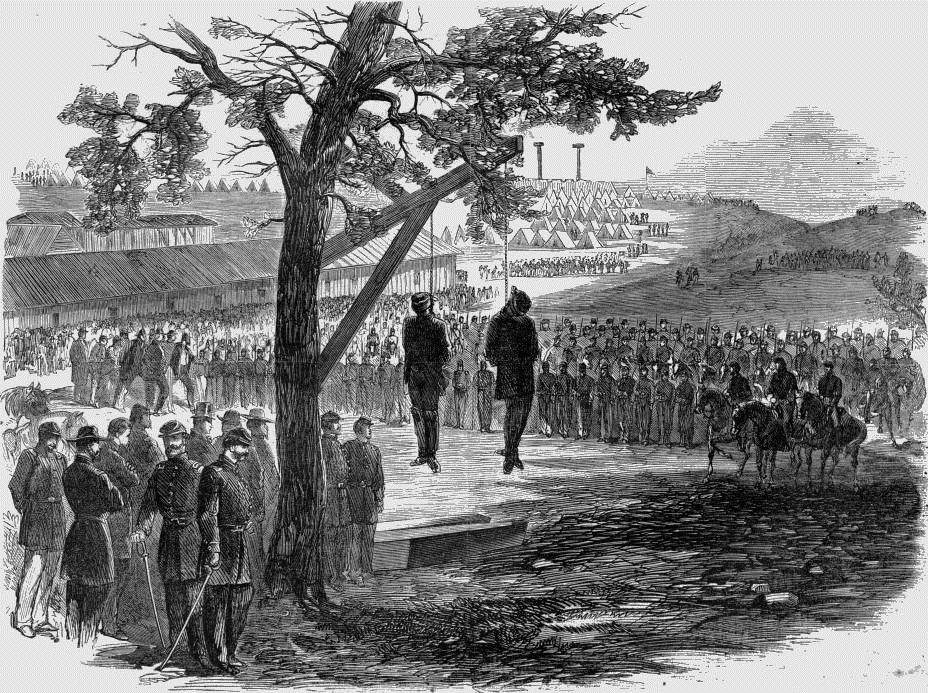
The execution of two Confederate spies by Union authorities during the American Civil War, 9 June 1863

A spy is a person employed to seek out secret information from a source. Within the United States Intelligence Community, "asset" is more common usage. A case officer or Special Agent, who may have diplomatic status (i.e., official cover or non-official cover), supports and directs the human collector. Cut-outs are couriers who do not know the agent or case officer but transfer messages. A safe house is a refuge for spies. Spies often seek to obtain secret information from another source.

In larger networks, the organization can be complex with many methods to avoid detection, including clandestine cell systems. Often the players have never met. Case officers are stationed in foreign countries to recruit and supervise intelligence agents, who in turn spy on targets in the countries where they are assigned. A spy need not be a citizen of the target country and hence does not automatically commit treason when operating within it. While the more common practice is to recruit a person already trusted with access to sensitive information, sometimes a person with a well-prepared synthetic identity (cover background), called a legend in tradecraft, may attempt to infiltrate a target organization.

These agents can be moles (who are recruited before they get access to secrets), defectors (who are recruited after they get access to secrets and leave their country) or defectors in place (who get access but do not leave).

A legend is also employed for an individual who is not an illegal agent, but is an ordinary citizen who is "relocated", for example, a "protected witness". Nevertheless, such a non-agent very likely will also have a case officer who will act as a controller. As in most, if not all synthetic identity schemes, for whatever purpose (illegal or legal), the assistance of a controller is required.

Spies may also be used to spread disinformation in the organization in which they are planted, such as giving false reports about their country's military movements, or about a competing company's ability to bring a product to market. Spies may be given other roles that also require infiltration, such as sabotage.

Many governments spy on their allies as well as their enemies, although they typically maintain a policy of not commenting on this. Governments also employ private companies to collect information on their behalf such as SCG International Risk, International Intelligence Limited and others.

Many organizations, both national and non-national, conduct espionage operations. It should not be assumed that espionage is always directed at the most secret operations of a target country. National and terrorist organizations and other groups are also targeted. This is because governments want to retrieve information that they can use to be proactive in protecting their nation from potential terrorist attacks.

Communications both are necessary to espionage and clandestine operations, and also a vulnerability when the adversary has sophisticated SIGINT detection and interception capability. Spies rely on COVCOM or covert communication through technically advanced spy devices. Agents must also transfer money securely.

== Industrial espionage ==
Industrial espionage, also known as economic espionage, corporate spying, or corporate espionage, is a form of espionage conducted for commercial purposes instead of purely national security. While political espionage is conducted or orchestrated by governments and is international in scope, industrial or corporate espionage is more often national and occurs between companies or corporations. It may include the acquisition of intellectual property, such as information on industrial manufacture, ideas, techniques and processes, recipes and formulas. Or it could include sequestration of proprietary or operational information, such as that on customer datasets, pricing, sales, marketing, research and development, policies, prospective bids, planning or marketing strategies or the changing compositions and locations of production. It may describe activities such as theft of trade secrets, bribery, blackmail, and technological surveillance. As well as orchestrating espionage on commercial organizations, governments can also be targets – for example, to determine the terms of a tender for a government contract.

Reportedly Canada is losing $12 billion and German companies are estimated to be losing about €50 billion ($87 billion) and 30,000 jobs to industrial espionage every year.

== Types of agent ==
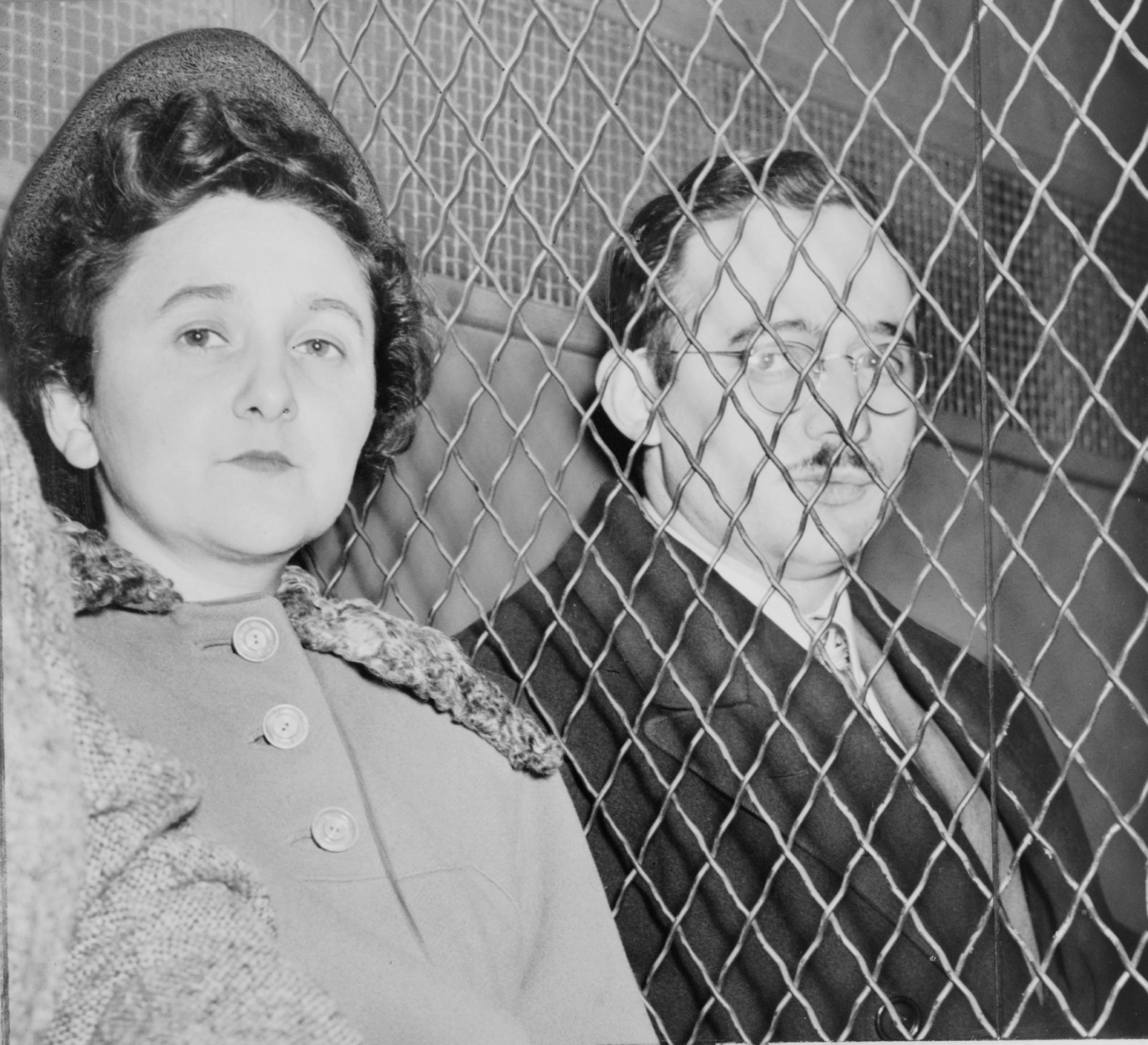
Ethel and Julius Rosenberg in 1951

In espionage jargon, an "agent" is the person who does the spying. They may be a citizen of a country recruited by that country to spy on another; a citizen of a country recruited by that country to carry out false flag assignments disrupting his own country; a citizen of one country who is recruited by a second country to spy on or work against his own country or a third country, and more.

In popular usage, this term is sometimes confused with an intelligence officer, intelligence operative, or case officer who recruits and handles agents.

Among the most common forms of agent are:

- Agent provocateur: instigates trouble or provides information to gather as many people as possible into one location for an arrest.
- Intelligence agent: provides access to sensitive information through the use of special privileges. If used in corporate intelligence gathering, this may include gathering information of a corporate business venture or stock portfolio. In economic intelligence, "Economic Analysts may use their specialized skills to analyze and interpret economic trends and developments, assess and track foreign financial activities, and develop new econometric and modelling methodologies." This may also include information of trade or tariff.
- Agent-of-influence: provides political influence in an area of interest, possibly including publications needed to further an intelligence service agenda. The use of the media to print a story to mislead a foreign service into action, exposing their operations while under surveillance.
- Double agent: engages in clandestine activity for two intelligence or security services (or more in joint operations), who provides information about one or about each to the other, and who wittingly withholds significant information from one on the instructions of the other or is unwittingly manipulated by one so that significant facts are withheld from the adversary. Peddlers, fabricators, and others who work for themselves rather than a service are not double agents because they are not agents. The fact that double agents have an agent relationship with both sides distinguishes them from penetrations, who normally are placed with the target service in a staff or officer capacity."
  - Redoubled agent: forced to mislead the foreign intelligence service after being caught as a double agent.
  - Unwitting double agent: offers or is forced to recruit as a double or redoubled agent and in the process is recruited by either a third-party intelligence service or his own government without the knowledge of the intended target intelligence service or the agent. This can be useful in capturing important information from an agent that is attempting to seek allegiance with another country. The double agent usually has knowledge of both intelligence services and can identify operational techniques of both, thus making third-party recruitment difficult or impossible. The knowledge of operational techniques can also affect the relationship between the operations officer (or case officer) and the agent if the case is transferred by an operational targeting officer] to a new operations officer, leaving the new officer vulnerable to attack. This type of transfer may occur when an officer has completed his term of service or when his cover is blown.
  - Triple agent: works for three intelligence services.
- Fabricator: used to spread disinformation.
- Sleeper agent: recruited to wake up and perform a specific set of tasks or functions while living undercover in an area of interest. This type of agent is not the same as a deep cover operative, who continually contacts a case officer to file intelligence reports. A sleeper agent is not in contact with anyone until activated.

Less common or lesser known forms of agent include:

- Access agent: provides access to other potential agents by providing offender profiling information that can help lead to recruitment into an intelligence service.
- Confusion agent: an individual who is dispatched for the primary purpose of confounding the intelligence or counterintelligence apparatus of another country, rather than for the purpose of collecting and transmitting information. Such an individual may provide misleading information, among other confusion tactics.
- Facilities agent: provides access to buildings, such as garages or offices used for staging operations, resupply, etc.
- Illegal agent: lives in another country under false credentials and does not report to a local station. A nonofficial cover operative can be dubbed an "illegal" when working in another country without diplomatic protection.
- Principal agent: functions as a handler for an established network of agents, usually considered "blue chip".

== Private espionage ==
Private espionage is a large-scale industry involving a vast array of different companies and individuals who provide a variety of services. These companies may be employed to act independently without any connection to a state agency or they may be hired to work in an integrated manner with a state agency, or agencies, in order to provide the specific services which are required.

In terms of scale, the writer Frederic Lemieux states that 'In 2010. it was estimated that 1,931 private intelligence firms were working within the intelligence community in the United States, employing approximately 265, 000 contractors with top-secret clearances.' He goes on to state, however, that only about 110 of them represent 90% of the market. These include: AEGIS, BAE Systems, Booz Allen Hamilton (BAH), CACI International Inc., CSRA Inc., General Dynamics, Leidos, Northrop Grumman, and Science Applications International Corporation.

== Law ==
Espionage against a nation is a crime under the legal code of many world states.

=== Espionage law in the United States ===
In the United States, it is covered by the Espionage Act of 1917. The risks of espionage vary. A spy violating the host country's laws may be deported, imprisoned, or even executed. A spy violating its own country's laws can be imprisoned for espionage or/and treason (which in the United States and some other jurisdictions can only occur if they take up arms or aids the enemy against their own country during wartime), or even executed, as the Rosenbergs were. For example, when Aldrich Ames handed a stack of dossiers of U.S. Central Intelligence Agency (CIA) agents in the Eastern Bloc to his KGB-officer "handler", the KGB "rolled up" several networks, and at least ten people were secretly shot. When Ames was arrested by the U.S. Federal Bureau of Investigation (FBI), he faced life in prison; his contact, who had diplomatic immunity, was declared persona non grata and taken to the airport. Ames' wife was threatened with life imprisonment if her husband did not cooperate; he did, and she was given a five-year sentence. Hugh Francis Redmond, a CIA officer in China, spent nineteen years in a Chinese prison for espionage—and died there—as he was operating without diplomatic cover and immunity.

In United States law, treason, espionage, and spying are separate crimes. Treason and espionage have graduated punishment levels.

The United States in World War I passed the Espionage Act of 1917. Over the years, many spies, such as the Soble spy ring, Robert Lee Johnson, the Rosenberg ring, Aldrich Hazen Ames, Robert Philip Hanssen, Jonathan Pollard, John Anthony Walker, James Hall III, and others have been prosecuted under this law.

In modern times, many people convicted of espionage have been given penal sentences rather than execution. For example, Aldrich Hazen Ames was an American CIA analyst, turned KGB mole, who was convicted of espionage in 1994; he served a life sentence without the possibility of parole in the high-security Allenwood U.S. Penitentiary, before dying in 2026. Ames was formerly a 31-year CIA counterintelligence officer and analyst who committed espionage against his country by spying for the Soviet Union and Russia. So far as it is known, Ames compromised the second-largest number of CIA agents, second only to Robert Hanssen, who also served a prison sentence until his death in 2023.

=== Use against non-spies ===
Espionage laws are also used to prosecute non-spies. In the United States, the Espionage Act of 1917 was used against socialist politician Eugene V. Debs (at that time the Act had much stricter guidelines and amongst other things banned speech against military recruiting). The law was later used to suppress publication of periodicals, for example of Father Coughlin in World War II. In the early 21st century, the act was used to prosecute whistleblowers such as Thomas Andrews Drake, John Kiriakou, and Edward Snowden, as well as officials who communicated with journalists for innocuous reasons, such as Stephen Jin-Woo Kim.

As of 2012, India and Pakistan were holding several hundred prisoners of each other's country for minor violations like trespass or visa overstay, often with accusations of espionage attached. Some of these include cases where Pakistan and India both deny citizenship to these people, leaving them stateless. The BBC reported in 2012 on one such case, that of Mohammed Idrees, who was held under Indian police control for approximately 13 years for overstaying his 15-day visa by 2–3 days after seeing his ill parents in 1999. Much of the 13 years were spent in prison waiting for a hearing, and more time was spent homeless or living with generous families. The Indian People's Union for Civil Liberties and Human Rights Law Network both decried his treatment. The BBC attributed some of the problems to tensions caused by the Kashmir conflict.

=== Espionage law in the UK ===
From ancient times, the penalty for espionage in many countries was execution. This was true right up until the era of World War II; for example, Josef Jakobs was a Nazi spy who parachuted into Great Britain in 1941 and was executed for espionage.

Espionage is illegal in the UK under the National Security Act 2023, which repealed prior Official Secrets Acts and creates three separate offences for espionage. A person is liable to be imprisoned for life for committing an offence under Section 1 of the Act, or 14 years for an offence under Sections 2 and 3.

==== Government intelligence law and its distinction from espionage ====
Government intelligence is very much distinct from espionage, and is not illegal in the UK, providing that the organisations of individuals are registered, often with the ICO, and are acting within the restrictions of the Regulation of Investigatory Powers Act (RIPA). 'Intelligence' is considered legally as "information of all sorts gathered by a government or organisation to guide its decisions. It includes information that may be both public and private, obtained from much different public or secret sources. It could consist entirely of information from either publicly available or secret sources, or be a combination of the two."

However, espionage and intelligence can be linked. According to the MI5 website, "foreign intelligence officers acting in the UK under diplomatic cover may enjoy immunity from prosecution. Such persons can only be tried for spying (or, indeed, any criminal offence) if diplomatic immunity is waived beforehand. Those officers operating without diplomatic cover have no such immunity from prosecution".

There are also laws surrounding government and organisational intelligence and surveillance. Generally, the body involved should be issued with some form of warrant or permission from the government and should be enacting their procedures in the interest of protecting national security or the safety of public citizens. Those carrying out intelligence missions should act within not only RIPA but also the Data Protection Act and Human Rights Act. However, there are spy equipment laws and legal requirements around intelligence methods that vary for each form of intelligence enacted.

=== Military intelligence and military justice ===
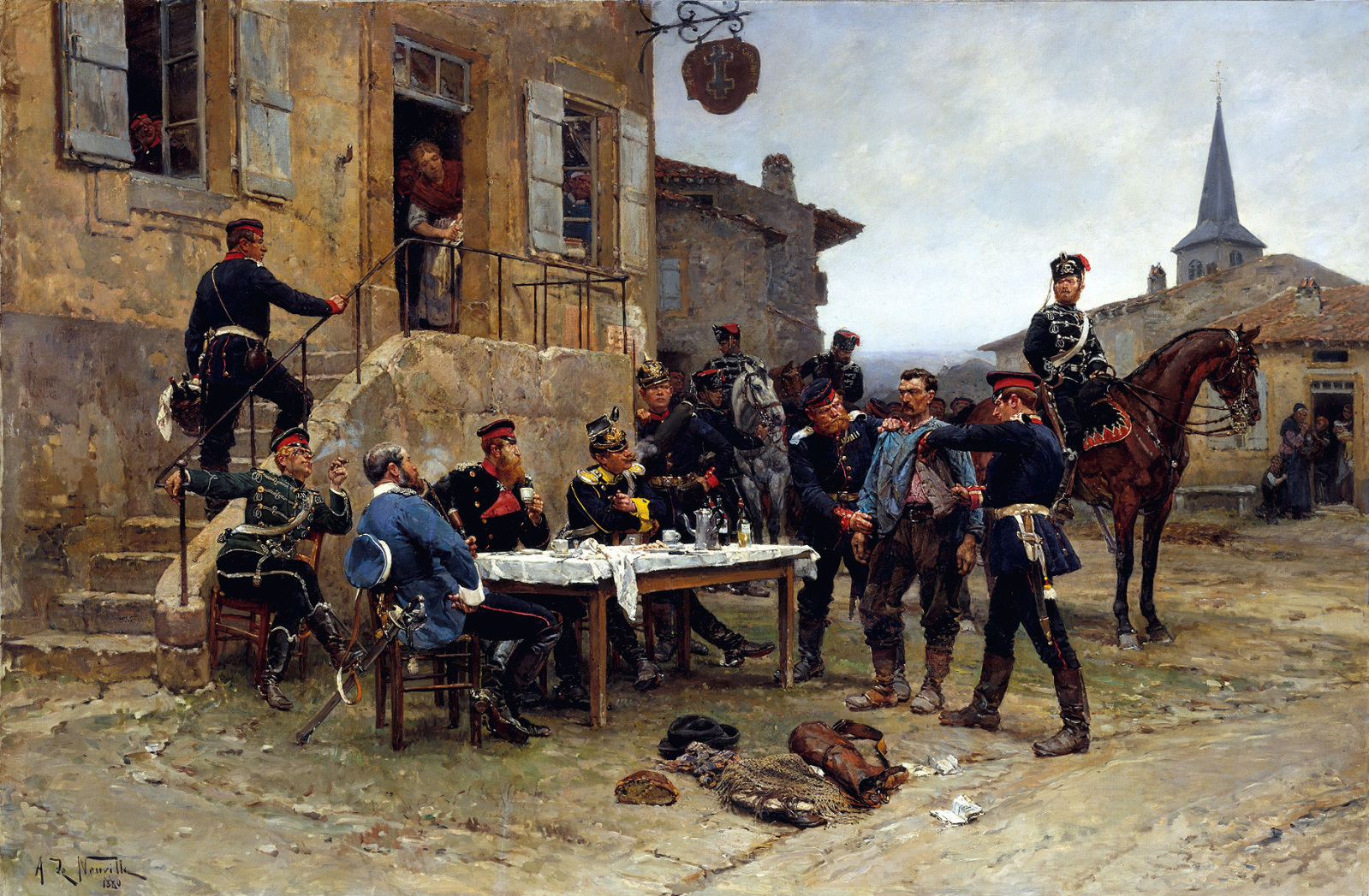
Painting of French spy captured during the Franco-Prussian War by Alphonse de Neuville, 1880

In war, espionage is considered permissible as many nations recognize the inevitability of opposing sides seeking intelligence each about the dispositions of the other. To make the mission easier and successful, combatants wear disguises to conceal their true identity from the enemy while penetrating enemy lines for intelligence gathering. However, if they are caught behind enemy lines in disguises, they are not entitled to prisoner-of-war status and subject to prosecution and punishment—including execution.

The Hague Convention of 1907 addresses the status of wartime spies, specifically within "Laws and Customs of War on Land" (Hague IV); 18 October 1907: Chapter II Spies". Article 29 states that a person is considered a spy who, acts clandestinely or on false pretences, infiltrates enemy lines with the intention of acquiring intelligence about the enemy and communicate it to the belligerent during times of war. Soldiers who penetrate enemy lines in proper uniforms for the purpose of acquiring intelligence are not considered spies but are lawful combatants entitled to be treated as prisoners of war upon capture by the enemy. Article 30 states that a spy captured behind enemy lines may only be punished following a trial. However, Article 31 provides that if a spy successfully rejoined his own military and is then captured by the enemy as a lawful combatant, he cannot be punished for his previous acts of espionage and must be treated as a prisoner of war. This provision does not apply to citizens who committed treason against their own country or co-belligerents of that country and may be captured and prosecuted at any place or any time regardless whether he rejoined the military to which he belongs or not or during or after the war.

The ones that are excluded from being treated as spies while behind enemy lines are escaping prisoners of war and downed airmen as international law distinguishes between a disguised spy and a disguised escaper. It is permissible for these groups to wear enemy uniforms or civilian clothes in order to facilitate their escape back to friendly lines so long as they do not attack enemy forces, collect military intelligence, or engage in similar military operations while so disguised. Soldiers who are wearing enemy uniforms or civilian clothes simply for the sake of warmth along with other purposes rather than engaging in espionage or similar military operations while so attired are also excluded from being treated as unlawful combatants.

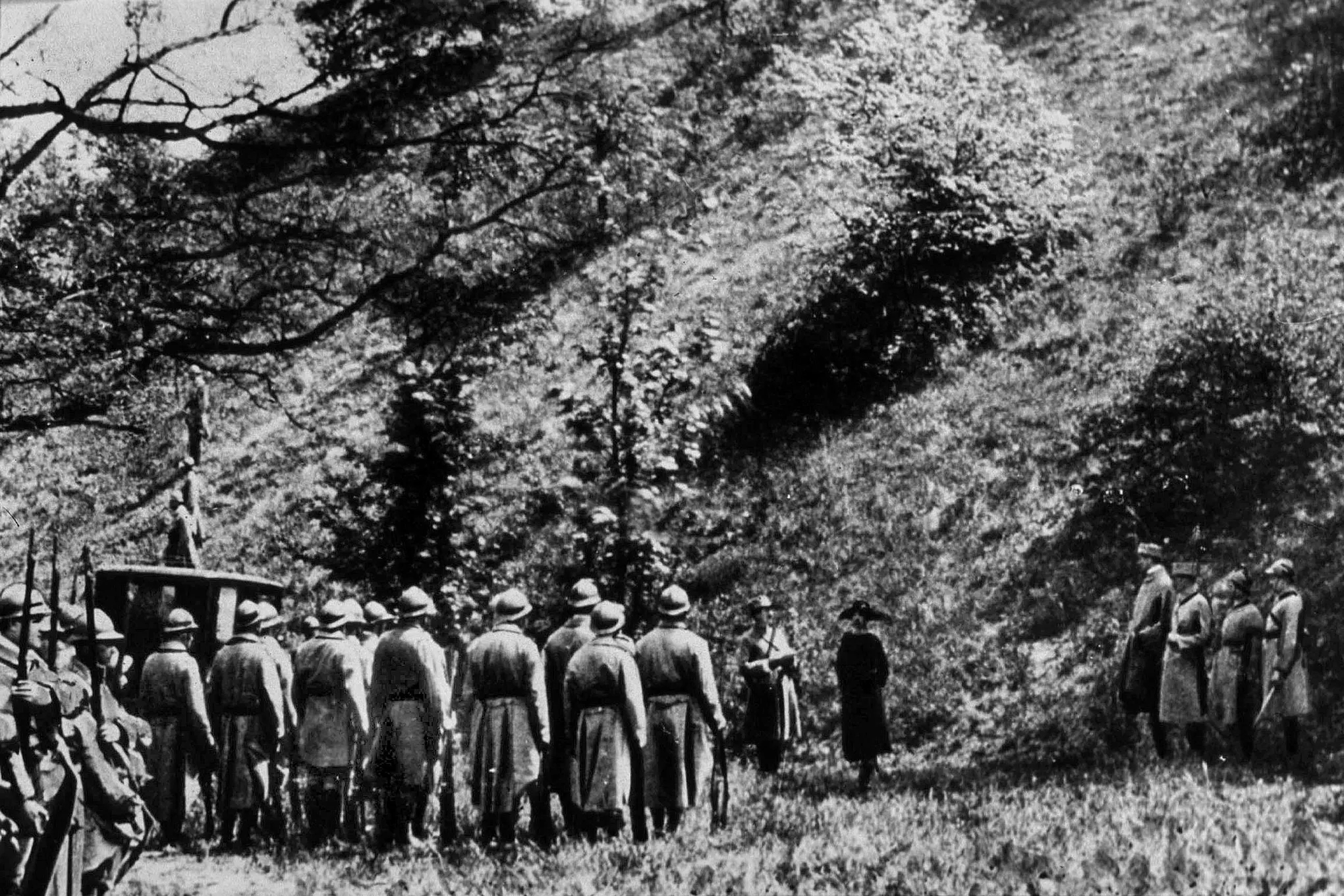
Execution scene from a 1920 film about Mata Hari

Saboteurs are treated as spies as they too wear disguises behind enemy lines for the purpose of waging destruction on an enemy's vital targets in addition to intelligence gathering. For example, during World War II, eight German agents entered the U.S. in June 1942 as part of Operation Pastorius, a sabotage mission against U.S. economic targets. Two weeks later, all were arrested in civilian clothes by the FBI thanks to two German agents betraying the mission to the U.S. Under the Hague Convention of 1907, these Germans were classified as spies and tried by a military tribunal in Washington D.C. On 3 August 1942, all eight were found guilty and sentenced to death. Five days later, six were executed by electric chair at the District of Columbia jail. Two who had given evidence against the others had their sentences reduced by President Franklin D. Roosevelt to prison terms. In 1948, they were released by President Harry S. Truman and deported to the American Zone of occupied Germany.

Eighteen German soldiers were shot by the United States Army after being caught in American uniform as part of Operation Greif during the Battle of the Bulge in 1944. In June 1945, after Germany had been occupied by the allies, the US Army executed six individuals, including two German youths aged 16 and 17, for espionage committed against American forces during the final stages of World War II.

The U.S. codification of enemy spies is Article 106 of the Uniform Code of Military Justice. This provides a mandatory death sentence if a person captured in the act is proven to be "lurking as a spy or acting as a spy in or about any place, vessel, or aircraft, within the control or jurisdiction of any of the armed forces, or in or about any shipyard, any manufacturing or industrial plant, or any other place or institution engaged in work in aid of the prosecution of the war by the United States, or elsewhere".

== Spy fiction ==
Spies have long been favorite topics for novelists and filmmakers. An early example of espionage literature is Kim by the English novelist Rudyard Kipling, with a description of the training of an intelligence agent in the Great Game between the UK and Russia in 19th century Central Asia. An even earlier work was James Fenimore Cooper's classic novel, The Spy, written in 1821, about an American spy in New York during the Revolutionary War.

During the many 20th-century spy scandals, much information became publicly known about national spy agencies and dozens of real-life secret agents. These sensational stories piqued public interest in a profession largely off-limits to human interest news reporting, a natural consequence of the secrecy inherent in their work. To fill in the blanks, the popular conception of the secret agent has been formed largely by 20th and 21st-century fiction and film. Attractive and sociable real-life agents such as Valerie Plame find little employment in serious fiction, however. The fictional secret agent is more often a loner, sometimes amoral—an existential hero operating outside the everyday constraints of society. Loner spy personalities may have been a stereotype of convenience for authors who already knew how to write loner private investigator characters that sold well from the 1920s to the present.

Johnny Fedora achieved popularity as a fictional agent of early Cold War espionage, but James Bond is the most commercially successful of the many spy characters created by intelligence insiders during that struggle. Other fictional agents include Le Carré's George Smiley, and Harry Palmer as played by Michael Caine.

Jumping on the spy bandwagon, other writers also started writing about spy fiction featuring female spies as protagonists, such as The Baroness, which has more graphic action and sex, as compared to other novels featuring male protagonists.

Spy fiction has permeated the video game world as well, in games such as Perfect Dark, GoldenEye 007, No One Lives Forever, Tom Clancy's Splinter Cell, Team Fortress 2 and the Metal Gear series.

Espionage has also made its way into comedy depictions. The 1960s TV series Get Smart, the 1983 Finnish film Agent 000 and the Deadly Curves, and Johnny English film trilogy portrays an inept spy, while the 1985 movie Spies Like Us depicts a pair of none-too-bright men sent to the Soviet Union to investigate a missile.

The historical novel The Emperor and the Spy highlights the adventurous life of U.S. Colonel Sidney Forrester Mashbir, who during the 1920s and 1930s attempted to prevent war with Japan, and when war did erupt, he became General MacArthur's top advisor in the Pacific Theater of World War Two.

Black Widow is also a fictional agent who was introduced as a Russian spy, an antagonist of the superhero Iron Man. She later became an agent of the fictional spy agency S.H.I.E.L.D. and a member of the superhero team the Avengers.

Unlike much of the spy fiction, real life espionage is described as routine and boring work.

== See also ==
- American espionage in China
- Central Intelligence Agency
- Chinese intelligence activity abroad
- Chinese espionage in the United States
- Clandestine operation
- Cover (intelligence gathering)
- Covert operation
- Detective
- Double Agent (TV Series)
- Federal Bureau of Investigation
- Foreign agent
- History of Soviet espionage
- Human intelligence (intelligence gathering)
- Intelligence assessment
- James Gannon (author)
- List of intelligence agencies
- List of intelligence gathering disciplines
- MI5
- Military intelligence
- Secret identity
- Secret service
- Sleeper agent
- Special agent
- Spying on United Nations leaders by United States diplomats
- Undercover operation
