= Fires of Eden =

Fires of Eden may refer to:

- Fires of Eden (novel), a 1994 novel by Dan Simmons
- Fires of Eden (album), a 1990 album by Judy Collins, or the title track
