= Good girl art =

Artwork featuring attractive women in comics and pulp magazines

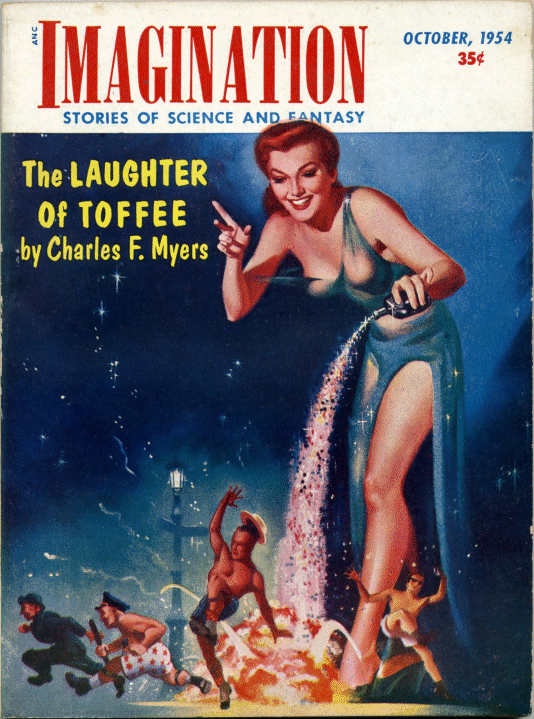
- Harold W. McCauley illustration for Imagination

Related genres
- Bad girl art

Good girl art (GGA) is a style of artwork depicting women primarily featured in comic books, comic strips, and pulp magazines. The term was coined by David T. Alexander (b. 1944), co-founder of the American Comic Book Company of Studio City, CA, appearing in its mail order catalogs from the 1970s to 1989, and is used by modern comic experts to describe the hyper-sexualized version of femininity depicted in comics of the era.

== History ==
The science fiction author Richard A. Lupoff defined good girl art as:

A cover illustration depicting an attractive young woman, usually in skimpy or form-fitting clothing, and designed for erotic stimulation. The term does not apply [i.e., refer] to the morality of the "good girl", who is often a gun moll, tough cookie or wicked temptress.

The popularity of good girl art peaked in the 1940s and 1950s as the style gained favor with young men, particularly US servicemen, for whom comics served as an opportunity to "girl watch". Leading artists of the movement include Bill Ward (known for his Torchy comics) and Matt Baker, who was one of the few African Americans working as an artist during the Golden Age of Comics.

During this period, GGA also found its way into newspaper comic strips. One of the early examples of good girl art was Russell Stamm's Invisible Scarlet O'Neil, a superhero often depicted in lingerie.

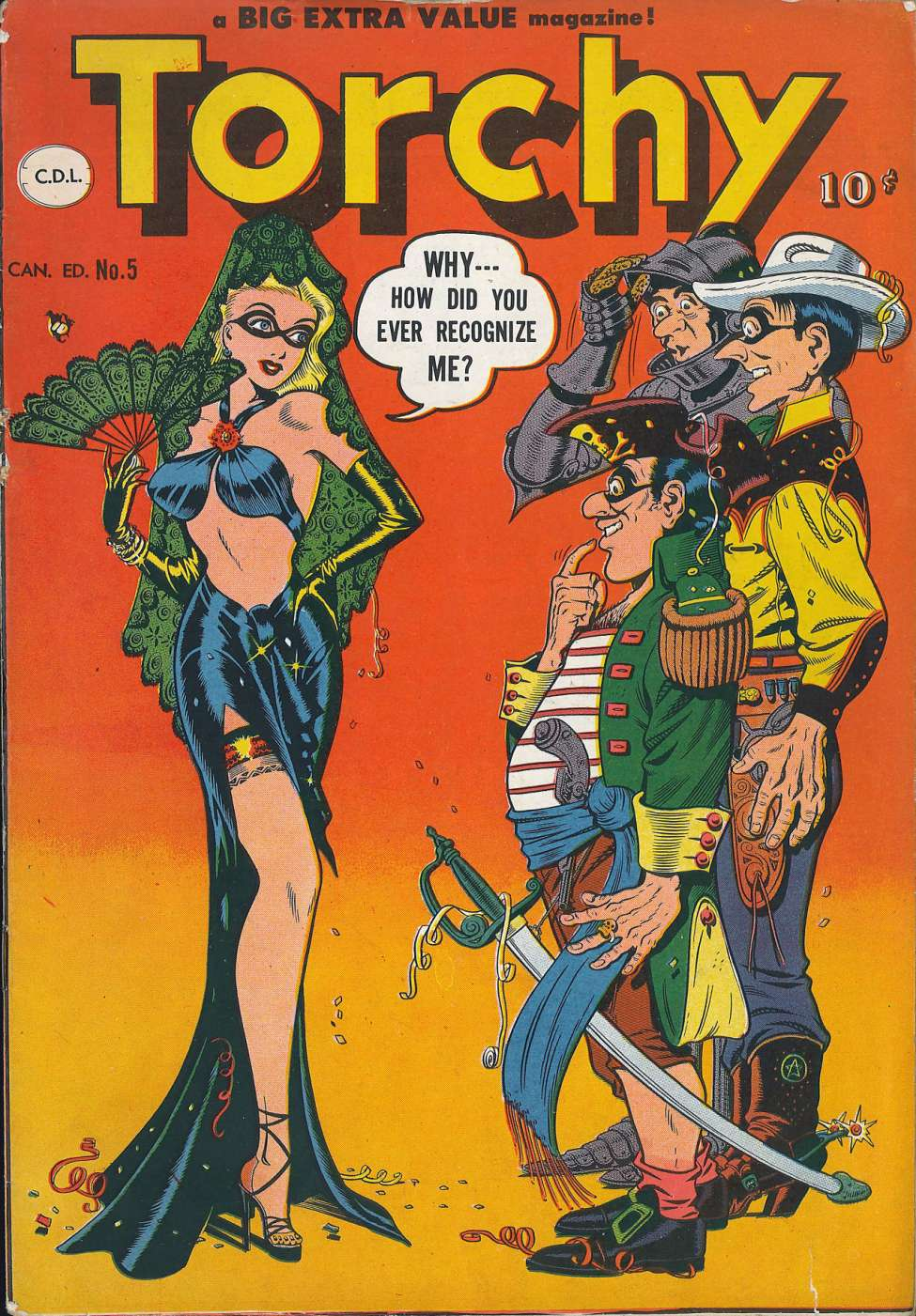
Torchy #5 (July 1950) cover art by Bill Ward.

Use of the phrase has since expanded to indicate a style of artwork in which female characters in comic books, cartoons, and covers for digest magazines, paperbacks and pulp magazines are shown in gratuitously provocative or suggestive (and sometimes very improbable) situations and locations, such as outer space. The artwork sometimes involves bondage or damsel-in-distress scenarios.

In the United Kingdom, the genre of good girl art was also popularized by several notable artists. Arthur Ferrier, renowned for his work in British magazines such as Blighty and his comic strip Our Dumb Blonde, was a prominent figure. Norman Pett gained fame through his creation of Jane, a comic strip character who became an iconic figure in British pop culture during World War II, often credited with boosting morale among troops. Reginald Heade brought a distinctly British flair to good girl art as one of the finest British pulp fiction cover artists.

Two creators of GGA for science fiction magazine covers were Earle K. Bergey (Startling Stories, Thrilling Wonder Stories) and Harold W. McCauley (Imagination, Fantastic Adventures). In the '70s pulp fiction, Hector Garrido drew the GGA book covers of The Baroness spy thriller series by Paul Kenyon and The Destroyer men's adventure pulp novels by Warren Murphy and Richard Sapir.

In 1985, Bill Pearson edited and published Good Girls, a collection of artwork by himself, Vince Alascia, Richard Bassford, John Beatty, Stan Drake, Brad W. Foster, Frank Frazetta, Frank Godwin, V. T. Hamlin, Roy Krenkel, Bob McLeod, Ed Paschke, Willy Pogany, Trina Robbins, Wally Wood, Mike Zeck and others.

From 1990 to 2001, AC Comics published 19 issues of Pearson's Good Girl Art Quarterly (incorporating several issues of Good Girl Comics), featuring a mixture of photos and new comics with reprints of vintage stories. Other artists in the series include Nina Albright, Dick Ayers, Frank Bolle, Gill Fox, Jack Kamen, Bob Lubbers, Pete Morisi, and Bob Powell.

== See also ==
- Bad girl art
- Fan service
- Pin-up model
- Portrayal of women in American comics
