= All the King's Men (1949 film) =

1949 film by Robert Rossen

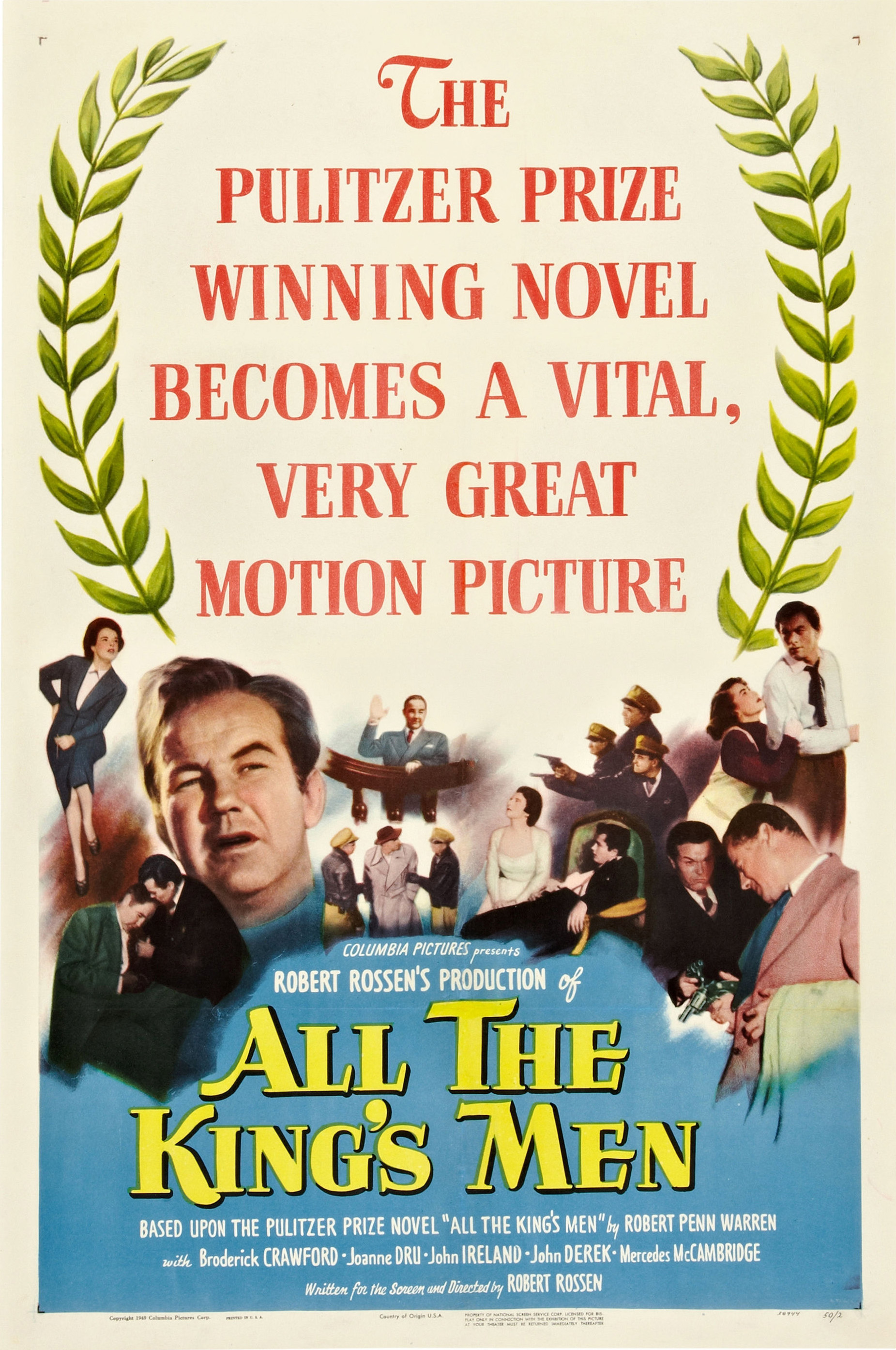
- Theatrical release poster
- Directed by: Robert Rossen
- Screenplay by: Robert Rossen
- Based on: All the King's Men (1946 novel) by Robert Penn Warren
- Produced by: Robert Rossen
- Starring: Broderick Crawford; Joanne Dru; John Ireland; John Derek; Mercedes McCambridge
- Cinematography: Burnett Guffey
- Edited by: Al Clark; Robert Parrish
- Music by: Louis Gruenberg
- Production company: Columbia Pictures
- Distributed by: Columbia Pictures
- Release dates: November 8, 1949 (New York City); January 1950 (U.S.)
- Running time: 110 minutes
- Country: United States
- Language: English
- Budget: $2 million
- Box office: $4.2 million (rentals)

All the King's Men is a 1949 American political drama film noir written, produced, and directed by Robert Rossen. It is based on Robert Penn Warren's Pulitzer Prize-winning 1946 novel. It stars Broderick Crawford, John Ireland, Mercedes McCambridge, and Joanne Dru. The film centers on the rise and fall of Willie Stark (Crawford), an idealistic but ruthless politician in the American South, patterned after Louisiana Governor Huey Long.

Released by Columbia Pictures on November 8, 1949, the film received widespread acclaim from critics, and was a commercial success. At the 22nd Academy Awards the film was nominated for seven Oscars and won three; Best Picture, Best Actor for Crawford, and Best Supporting Actress for McCambridge, making an impressive film debut. The film also won five Golden Globes, and was nominated for the Golden Lion at the 11th Venice International Film Festival.

In 2001, All the King's Men was deemed "culturally, historically, or aesthetically significant" by the Library of Congress and was selected for preservation in the United States National Film Registry.

== Plot ==
Reporter Jack Burden is sent on assignment to write about Willie Stark, running for county treasurer in an unnamed Southern state. Stark campaigns against the corruption of local politicians. Burden meets Stark and his family and writes an inspiring story on Stark's honesty and courage. Using their power, including sway over the police, the local political machine shuts out Stark. After his loss, Stark earns a law degree. When a shoddily-constructed school in his county experiences a structural collapse that kills 12 students during a fire drill, voters regret not voting for Stark. He wins a lawsuit against the county, leading to a statewide investigation. Stark uses this to build political momentum and is eventually drafted as a necessary spoiler candidate for Governor.

Stark embarks on the campaign trail with Burden and Sadie Burke, installed as a mole by the frontrunner. Initially, Stark speaks obtusely and plainly about a balanced budget plan for the state, and his campaign falters. But after Sadie reveals the truth of his candidacy, Stark gives impassioned speeches. Burden continues reporting on the campaign, but resigns after being ordered not to write positively about Stark. Ultimately, Stark loses, but draws large grassroots support from the rural areas of the state as he identifies as one of them – a fooled "hick."

Over the next four years, Stark campaigns, and makes backroom deals to gain influence and campaign funds. Meanwhile, Burden has a tough time finding a job until Stark hires him to do opposition research. Stark and Burden go back to Burden's home to convince Burden's friends and family to support Stark. Skeptical of his alleged deals and big promises, Adam, brother of Burden's girlfriend, Anne Stanton, asks questions and is unconvinced. However, sensing his demagogic magnetism, Anne believes in Stark. Stark promises a free hand as State Attorney General to Anne's uncle, the honest Judge Stanton, and promises to put Adam in charge of a new hospital. Stark wins in a landslide and is portrayed in newsreels as either a messiah or a dictator.

During his time as Governor, Stark wields power in aggressive and corrupt ways as Burden develops a black book of biographical leverage to extract political favors and votes in support of Stark's agenda. Stark covers up a scandal by a member of his administration, after which Judge Stanton resigns as Attorney General and publicly asserts Stark's corruption. Stark's loss of morals, and alienation from his former self, is exacerbated as he philanders with women, including Anne and Sadie. Feeling the pressure of his father's status, Stark's adopted college-aged son Tommy copes by drinking. Following a football practice where Stark berates Tommy for drinking, Tommy gets drunk and crashes his car, injuring himself and killing his female passenger. To combat the bad press, Stark pressures Tommy into a game despite him not being fully recovered. During the game, Tommy takes a rough hit, is severely injured, and rushed to hospital. Stark, blaming himself for Tommy's injury, initially demands a specialist, but owing to the pressure of time, has no choice but for Adam to operate. As Adam warned beforehand, Tommy ends up a paraplegic.

Burden gives Anne evidence of Judge Stanton's possible past wrongdoing that Burden has buried out of respect for the judge. Stark begins his re-election campaign by visiting his estranged family. While there, Judge Stanton publicly blames Stark for the suspicious death of the father of the girl in Tommy's car accident after the father refused Stark's bribe to make it go away. Stark is impeached, while the judge controls how certain senators will vote at the trial. Stark issues orders to "turn the yokels out" to demonstrate on his behalf and it is expected that he will use the state militia to remain in power. Stark visits Judge Stanton in an attempt to strongarm him into releasing his senators with Burden's evidence, which was given him by Anne. Judge Stanton commits suicide and the impeachment ends with Stark's acquittal.

At Stark's public celebration, distraught over the pressure put on Judge Stanton, Adam shoots Stark, in the belief that the only reason he was appointed hospital director was because his sister was Willie Stark's mistress. Having lost all respect for Stark, Burden tries to persuade Anne to help him destroy Stark's reputation. Stark dies on the steps of the capitol bemoaning his lost opportunity for the presidency and wondering why this had to happen to him.

== Cast ==
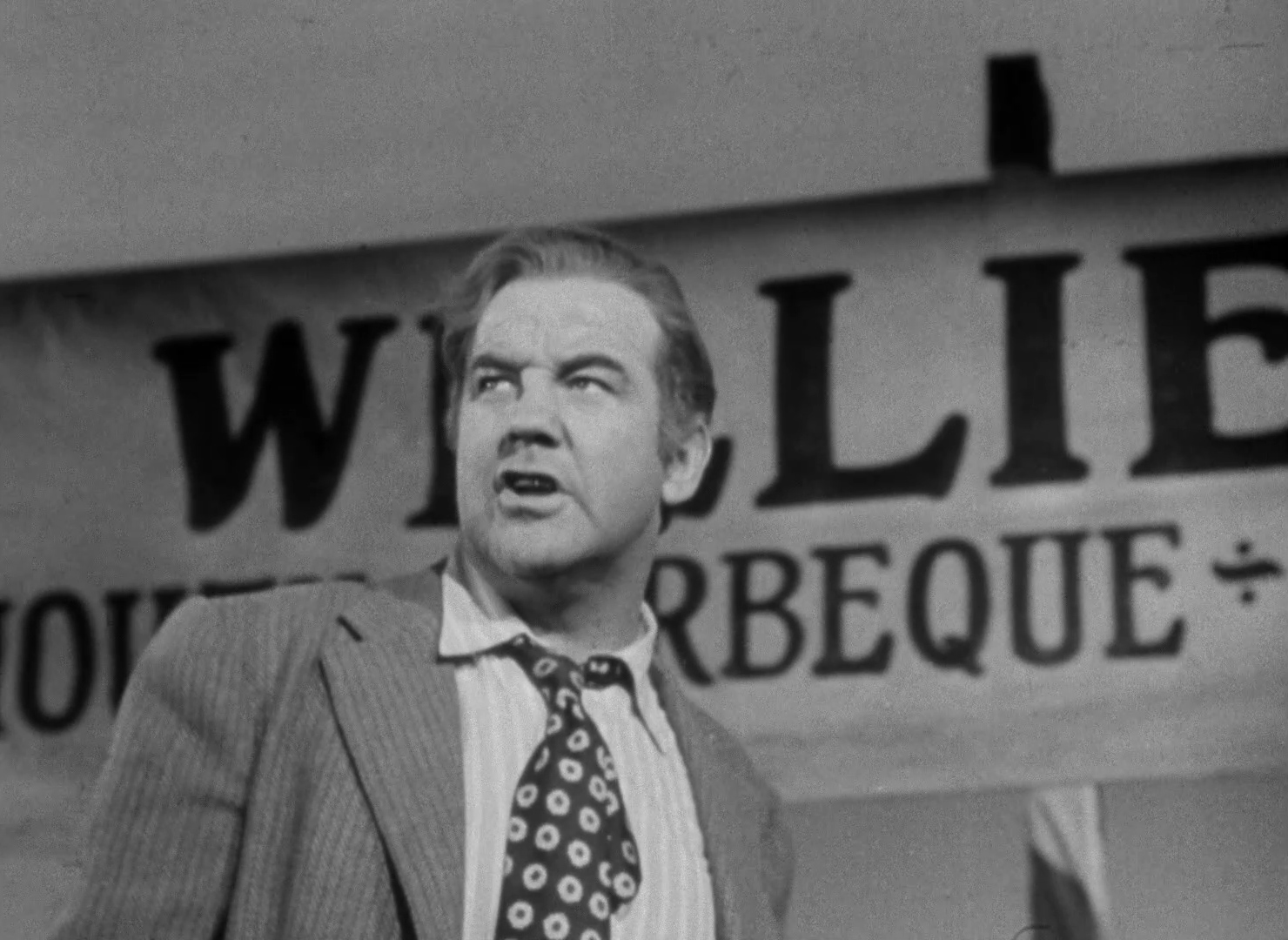
Broderick Crawford as Willie Stark in All the King's Men

- Broderick Crawford as Willie Stark
- John Ireland as Jack Burden
- Joanne Dru as Anne Stanton
- John Derek as Tom Stark
- Mercedes McCambridge as Sadie Burke
- Shepperd Strudwick as Adam Stanton
- Ralph Dumke as Tiny Duffy
- Anne Seymour as Mrs. Lucy Stark
- Katherine Warren as Mrs. McEvoy
- Raymond Greenleaf as Judge Monte Stanton
- Walter Burke as Sugar Boy
- Will Wright as Dolph Pillsbury
- Grandon Rhodes as Floyd McEvoy
- H. C. Miller as Pa Stark
- Richard Hale as Hale
- Houseley Stevenson as Mr. Madison
- Helene Stanley as Helene Hale
- Paul Ford as State Senator
- Stephen Chase as Puckett

== Production ==
=== Writing ===
Before Robert Rossen was hired, Norman Corwin adapted Robert Penn Warren's novel All the King's Men into a screenplay. A Writers Guild arbitration board later awarded sole screenwriting credit to Rossen.

Rossen's script makes several changes to the novel, including shifting the main story perspective from reporter Jack Burden, the novel's narrator, to Willie Stark himself. The film also removes any direct references to the state in which the film is set, as well as specificities of Southern American politics. Brian Neve, writing for Cinéaste, noted that this helps to "universalize" Stark's story.

=== Casting ===
Rossen originally offered the starring role to John Wayne, who found the script unpatriotic and indignantly refused the part. Broderick Crawford took the role and won the 1949 Academy Award for Best Actor, beating out Wayne, who was nominated for Sands of Iwo Jima.

The casting of Crawford was considered risky, as he was not a leading man, nor a box office draw, but primarily a character actor. Columbia Pictures chief Harry Cohn favored Spencer Tracy, but Rossen rejected this, thinking the audience would find Tracy too likable. Rossen felt that Crawford's burly appearance and "tough guy" demeanor were well-suited to portray Stark as both everyman and demagogue. Crawford was so enthusiastic for the role that he took only half of his usual fee. To prepare, Crawford studied newsreel footage and voice recordings of Huey Long, though he noted the studio had an unspoken rule against mentioning the late Governor's death on set.

John Derek had just made Knock on Any Door for Columbia. He and Crawford would be reunited in several more films.

=== Filming locations ===
The film was shot using local residents on location, rare in Hollywood at the time. The scene early in the film in which Stark is arrested for unauthorized public speaking was filmed at the old plaza in Suisun City, California, and the officer who warns and then arrests Stark was played by the local sheriff, A. C. Tillman.

A house in nearby Fairfield was used as the exterior of Stark's house. Sets closely based on photos of the interior of that house were built in the nearby M & M Skateway (now gone) for the indoor scenes. The elementary school was a local one as well, but the building no longer exists.

The San Joaquin County courthouse in Stockton, built in 1898 and demolished a decade after the film's release, was featured prominently.

Don Siegel worked on the film as an uncredited second unit director.

=== Editing ===
Paul Tatara, writing for TCM, describes the film as "one of those pictures that was saved in the editing". Al Clark, the original editor, had difficulty making a coherent version from the large amount of footage that had been shot. Rossen and Columbia Studios head Harry Cohn hired Robert Parrish to make changes. However, Parrish's efforts proved unsuccessful as Rossen stayed heavily involved; after several weeks of editing, the film was still over four hours long. Cohn almost released this cut before Rossen told Parrish, "Select what you consider to be the center of each scene, put the film in the synch machine and wind down a hundred feet before and a hundred feet after, and chop it off, regardless of what's going on. Cut through dialogue, music, anything. Then, when you're finished, we'll run the picture and see what we've got."

After All the King's Men won its Academy Award for Best Picture, Harry Cohn repeatedly gave Parrish credit for saving the film. Although Clark is credited as the film's editor and Parrish as editorial advisor, both of them were nominated for an Academy Award for Best Film Editing.

== Reception ==
=== Critical response ===
The film received wide acclaim upon its release. Film critic Bosley Crowther lauded the film and its direction in his review, writing, "Robert Rossen has written and directed, as well as personally produced, a rip-roaring film of the same title ... We have carefully used that descriptive as the tag for this new Columbia film because a quality of turbulence and vitality is the one that it most fully demonstrates ... In short, Mr. Rossen has assembled in this starkly unprettified film a piece of pictorial journalism that is remarkable for its brilliant parts." Critic William Brogdon, writing for Variety magazine, was also complimentary and praised Broderick Crawford's work, "As the rural Abe Lincoln, springing up from the soil to make himself a great man by using the opinionless, follow-the-leader instinct of the more common voter, Broderick Crawford does a standout performance. Given a meaty part, his histrionic bent wraps it up for a great personal success adding much to the many worthwhile aspects of the drama." It won an Associated Press poll in 1950 as the best film of 1949, and Broderick Crawford was regarded as the best actor in that same poll.

On Rotten Tomatoes, All the King's Men holds a rating of 97% based on 70 reviews, with an average rating of 8.10/10. The website summarizes the consensus as: "Broderick Crawford is spellbinding as politician Willie Stark in director Robert Rossen's adaptation of the Robert Penn Warren novel about the corrosive effects of power on the human soul."

=== Later analysis ===
Film historian Spencer Selby calls the film "[A] hard-hitting noir adaptation of Warren's eloquent novel". Joe Goldberg, film historian and former story editor for Paramount Pictures, wrote about the content of the plot and its noirish fatalistic conclusion, "The plot makes sense, the dialogue is memorable, the story arises from the passions and ideas of the characters. It deals with graft, corruption, love, drink and betrayal, and the subversion of idealism by power, and it might even make someone angry... The story moves toward its conclusion with the dark inevitability of film noir." Author Harry Keyishian wonders if Willie Stark is "a good man corrupted by the political process, or a bad one whose inherent vice emerges when he gets a chance for power."

=== Accolades ===
In 2001, the film was selected for preservation in the United States National Film Registry by the Library of Congress as being "culturally, historically, or aesthetically significant". The Academy Film Archive preserved All the King's Men in 2000. As of 2025 and beyond, it is notable for the last Best Picture winner to be based on a Pulitzer Prize-winning novel.

==== Academy Awards 1949 ====
All the King's Men received seven Academy Awards nominations, winning three.

Award	Result	Winner
Best Motion Picture	Won	Robert Rossen Productions Columbia (Robert Rossen, Producer)
Best Director	Nominated	Robert Rossen; Winner was Joseph L. Mankiewicz – A Letter to Three Wives
Best Actor	Won	Broderick Crawford
Best Supporting Actor	Nominated	John Ireland; Winner was Dean Jagger – Twelve O'Clock High
Best Supporting Actress	Won	Mercedes McCambridge
Best Writing, Screenplay	Nominated	Robert Rossen; Winner was Joseph L. Mankiewicz – A Letter to Three Wives
Best Film Editing	Nominated	Robert Parrish and Al Clark; Winner was Harry W. Gerstad – Champion

== See also ==
- List of American films of 1949
- All the King's Men (2006 film, directed by Steven Zaillian and also based on Warren's book)
- Politics in fiction
