= Eufloria =

2009 British real-time strategy video game

Eufloria and Eufloria HD
- Steam header
- Developers: Omni Systems Limited (Alex May, Rudolf Kremers, Brian Grainger)
- Publisher: Headup Games (Germany)
- Composer: Brian Grainger
- Platforms: Microsoft Windows, Android, Linux, PlayStation Network, iOS, BlackBerry PlayBook, Nintendo Switch
- Release: Windows; 20 October 2009; PSN: NA: 4 October 2011; EU: 5 October 2011; iOS; 8 February 2012; Nintendo Switch: NA: 31 December 2021
- Genre: Real-time strategy
- Mode: Single-player

Eufloria (formerly Dyson) is a real-time strategy video game developed by British studio Omni Systems Limited, consisting of independent developers Alex May, Rudolf Kremers and Brian Grainger. It was named after the Dyson tree hypothesis by Freeman Dyson that a tree-like plant could grow on a comet.

The game was released for Microsoft Windows in 2009, the PlayStation Network in 2011 and the iPad in 2012. Mac, Linux and Android versions of this game was pre-released along with Humble Indie Bundle for Android 4 on 8 November 2012. According to the official FAQ for the game, the final release for Mac and Linux was to be provided in the late summer of 2013.

It is set in a futuristic space environment, where the player assumes the role of the commander of interstellar lifeforms called Euflorians, who live and gain their resources on asteroids. The player has to use basic units that are grown on Dyson trees and are called "seedlings", to colonize and conquer asteroids. On asteroids, Dyson trees may be planted and as the tree grows and gets stronger, it will produce more seedlings with certain attributes. There are also flowers, defensive trees, and other units later in the game. Players battle other empires and seek to discover the origin of a mysterious grey menace, to speed up the return of the mythical Growers.

Eufloria has been described as a simple but charming game with calming music, graphics, and gameplay.

== Versions ==
There are two versions of Eufloria: the original release for Windows PCs and subsequently rewritten for the PlayStation Network now referred to as Eufloria Classic, and Eufloria HD, the actively maintained build first released on iOS and later on BlackBerry. The Humble Bundle 4 for Android made it available on Android, and also in pre-release form on PC, Mac, and Linux. Owners of the original Eufloria could upgrade for free once Eufloria HD was released on PC, Mac and Linux. This version was released October 2014. A version of Eufloria HD was released for the Nintendo Switch on 31 December 2021.

== Gameplay ==
Graphically, Eufloria is simple, with minimalistic graphics, and a simple design. The colour of the Euflorian empire is customizable.

At the start of the game, the player has one tree, called a Dyson tree, on an asteroid. The tree has a number of branches and leaves that fall off and become seedlings, which can be used to either create trees or fight other seedlings. Each tree is unique, the growth of its branches based on a fractal algorithm.

To create trees, 10 seedlings are needed in orbit of an asteroid. These seedlings then plummet into the ground to grow grass and the trees' roots. A plant called a defense tree may also be grown that attacks invading enemy seedlings by releasing explosive fruit. Over time, the plant's health, damage, and spawn rate increases. The player can also customize their asteroids with add-ons called 'flowers'.

If a dyson tree has a flower added, dysons with a vastly enhanced firerate and range are produced. If a defense tree has a flower added, lasermines are produced. These are powerful seedlings which can take on multiple enemies with multiple lasers, and a suicidal explosion.

The seedlings can attack enemy asteroids, and take them over by burrowing through the roots to the core, and sapping the energy of the asteroid.

All levels are partially randomly generated, meaning each playthrough is slightly different. Also, each asteroid is unique in size and values, and produces seedlings with different stats. There are three stats: Speed enhances the rate of movement of seedlings, Strength enhances the damage of seedlings, and Energy increases the speed at which seedlings can convert enemy asteroids. The stats also affect the appearance of the seedlings.

== Plot ==
The game begins in the far off future in space. The player controls a force of seedlings, and take more asteroids for the growers, mythical beings which spawned the seedlings. The mothertree hopes that by taking enough colonies for the growers, they can make them return. Early in the game, the player encounter an enemy, the greys, which has brutally attacked one of their colonies. Soon the mothertree learns that the greys have been driven mad by a disease, which forces them to attack. They also learn that another empire is attacking their empire and so the player is sent beyond the borders of the empire to find out why the greys are attacking, and deal with them. The player continues, gaining new technologies and rescuing allies along the way, to find that their enemies produced the greys, despite the danger that the greys would destroy them too. Eventually, the home asteroid of the greys was found. After conquering them, the mothertree analysed their remains, and found that all the enemy seedlings had the same DNA as the Euflorian's seedlings.

== Development ==
Originally called Dyson, the game started as a simple single proof of concept level. Levels were originally designed with the XML markup language, and later the Lua programming language for increased flexibility.

The game was renamed Eufloria after a contest on IGN's Direct2Drive. Over 400 names were sorted through, with Vernon Sydnor giving the winning name.

The game has since been upgraded with a campaign, substantial AI and graphical improvements, and has been translated into English, French, German, Italian, Spanish, and Dutch.

== Reception ==
Lewis Denby of Resolution Magazine gave the game a 6/10. Anthony Burch of Destructoid gave it a 4/10. Mike Rose of gamezebo gave it three out of five stars.

== Related Media ==
The original game has been followed up by a remake, re-release, and a sequel.

=== Eufloria HD ===
Eufloria HD is a remake of the original game, with additional features such as: beacon & terraforming trees, UI & control changes, speedup buttons, and balance improvements. It was first released on iOS and later on BlackBerry. The Humble Bundle 4 for Android made it available on Android, and also in pre-release form on PC, Mac, and Linux. Owners of the original Eufloria could upgrade for free once Eufloria HD was released on PC, Mac and Linux. This version was released October 2014. A version of Eufloria HD was released for the Nintendo Switch on 31 December 2021.

=== Eufloria Classic ===
Eufloria Classic is a 2025 re-release of the original game, with additional game modes, speedup buttons, Steam Deck support, a new OST, and additional languages.

=== Eufloria 2 ===
Eufloria 2 is an upcoming direct sequel to the original game, including a campaign mode with new lore, new evolution-based mechanics, ecosystem manipulation, modding support, and more. The original composer Milieu is returning for the soundtrack. The game is planned to release on Steam.
