= The Jupiter Theft =

1977 novel by Donald Moffitt

- Cover of the first edition
- Author: Donald Moffitt
- Cover artist: H. R. Van Dongen
- Language: English
- Genre: Science fiction
- Publisher: Del Rey Books
- Publication date: 1977
- Publication place: United States
- Media type: Print (Paperback)
- ISBN: 0-345-25505-4
- OCLC: 3034690
- Dewey Decimal: 813/.5/4
- LC Class: PZ4.M6964 Ju PS3563.O297

The Jupiter Theft is a 1977 science fiction novel by American writer Donald Moffitt, re-printed in 2003 with a new afterword.

== Plot summary ==
The initial part of the novel mixes near-future thriller and disaster novel scenarios, focussing on the discovery of a moving gamma-ray source headed towards Earth from the direction of Cygnus X-1, and the diversion of a Chinese-American Jupiter mission to investigate the new Solar System intruder. As the Chinese and Americans are mutually antagonistic politically, espionage and suspicion must be overcome for the Jupiter Mission to go ahead.

Once the Mission intercepts the intruder the story shifts into an alien contact scenario. The "intruder" is actually the silicate core of a Jovian planet, orbited by a moon and five immense alien spacecraft. The Jupiter Mission is intercepted in mid-space by aliens, dubbed Cygnans, riding on matter-annihilation powered "broomsticks". The mission is essentially destroyed, with the surviving crew taken alive as specimens for a Cygnan zoo. Now imprisoned, the Sino-American crew attempt contact with the Cygnans and seek to discover their true purpose in appearing in the Solar System. Using a Moog synthesizer and their natural gift of perfect pitch, one of the crew learns first to understand and then "speak" the Cygnan musical language, and is educated by Cygnan didactic films.

They discover the Cygnans have travelled for 6000 light years - and six million earth years - escaping a home planet orbiting the progenitor star of Cygnus X-1, having discovered it was on course to collapse (forming the black hole that now occupies that point in space), searching for a new home; and, to do so, have raided numerous star systems for Jupiter-mass "gas giant" planets to use as fuel. The stop-off at Sol proves to be a particularly significant one as, having found every system they visited with habitable planets (whilst heading progressively further from the Galactic Center of the Milky Way) to already be populated with intelligent beings, their next destination is Andromeda, with the hope that a new galaxy may offer better results.

With help from fluffy pink bird-like humanoids from 61 Cygni, fellow zoo exhibits from the Cygnans' last and relatively proximal port-of-call, some of the humans foil a last-ditch sabotage attempt and escape the starships just before the strange convoy leaves the Solar System. Their escape requires securing a working example of the Cygnan annihilation drive, which humanity then develops into a much faster (though still, barely, subluminal) and more efficient stardrive, using the ice contained in comets to fuel their travels - instead of stealing entire planets.
