= A Winter Haunting =

2002 horror novel by Dan Simmons

- US Hardcover
- Author: Dan Simmons
- Language: English
- Genre: Horror
- Publisher: William Morrow
- Publication date: 22 January 2002
- Publication place: United States
- Media type: Print (hardback & paperback)
- Pages: 320
- ISBN: 0-380-97886-5
- OCLC: 46836963
- Dewey Decimal: 813/.54 21
- LC Class: PS3569.I47292 W5 2002
- Preceded by: Summer of Night

A Winter Haunting is a 2002 horror novel by American writer Dan Simmons. It was nominated for the Locus Award for Best Fantasy novel in 2003.

== Plot ==
Dale Stewart, a character from Summer of Night, has ruined his life. A fifty-one-year-old college professor and writer, he left his spouse for a young co-ed and the co-ed has left him.

He returns to Elm Haven, Illinois, where the events of Summer of Night took place. Dale is remembering these events as more pleasant than what actually happened. He will soon recall the truth and also must deal with current-day Neo-Nazis.
