= Summer of Night =

1991 novel by Dan Simmons

- Author: Dan Simmons
- Cover artist: Hector Garrido
- Language: English
- Genre: Horror
- Publisher: Putnam Pub Group
- Publication date: January 1991
- Publication place: United States
- Media type: Print (hardback and paperback)
- Pages: 473 (hardback) 600 (paperback)
- ISBN: 0-399-13573-1 (hardback edition)
- OCLC: 21760399
- Dewey Decimal: 813/.54 20
- LC Class: PS3569.I47292 S86 1991
- Preceded by: None
- Followed by: A Winter's Haunting

Summer of Night is the first in a series of horror novels by American writer Dan Simmons, published in 1991 by Warner Aspect. It was nominated for a British Fantasy Award in 1992. The subsequent books are Children of the Night (1992), Fires of Eden (1994) and A Winter Haunting (2002).

== Plot summary ==
Set in Elm Haven, Illinois, in 1960, Summer of Night recounts its five pre-teen protagonists' discovery that eerie, terrifying events are unfolding in the Old Central School. Operatives, including a dead soldier; giant worms with rows of sharp, serrated teeth; the animated corpse of a deceased teacher; schoolyard bullies; the driver of a rendering truck; their school teacher, and the principal of the school, serve a centuries-old evil that seeks to be reborn in their time — and in their town. It is only by banding together that the pre-teens can hope to defeat the monstrosity before it destroys them, their friends, their families — and, possibly, the world.

The sequel to Summer of Night is A Winter Haunting, in which Dale Stewart, now grown, returns to Elm Haven. Another sequel is Children of the Night, which features Mike O'Rourke, now a Roman Catholic priest, who is sent on a mission to investigate bizarre events in a European city. Another Summer of Night character, Dale's younger brother, Lawrence Stewart, appears as a minor character in Simmons' thriller Darwin's Blade, while the adult Cordie Cooke appears in Fires of Eden.

== Source materials ==
On his website, Simmons implies that his younger brother Wayne is the real-life model for the character Lawrence ("Larry") Stewart, as he himself is the model for Dale, as they were as boys in 1960 Elm Haven, Illinois. The brothers' friends, as they were as boys in the same year, are the models for other characters: Mike O'Toole and Jim Hatten, for Mike O'Rourke and Jim Harlen, respectively, and Kevin Hasselbacher, for Kevin Grumbacher. Simmons states that Brimfield, Illinois, where he lived for part of his childhood, is the source of his fictional 'Elm Haven'. The novel's Old Central School is based upon Brimfield School, which was torn down in 1960. Some of the incidents in the novel, such as the free show and the fair, are also based upon similar events that took place in Brimfield during Simmons' boyhood.
