= Hector Garrido =

American illustrator (1928–2020)

Hector Garrido (1928 – April 19, 2020) was an Argentine-born American book cover illustrator. He illustrated numerous science fiction, horror and adventure book covers, including all the covers for the Baroness series of pulp novels, and covers for the Destroyer series. He also illustrated romance and gothic novels, and Nancy Drew and Hardy Boys novels. He also did the painted artwork on G.I.Joe toy packaging of the 1980s. Some of his work is considered good girl art.

Garrido was born in Argentina and studied art in Buenos Aires. He emigrated to the United States, and began professional work there in the 1950s. After the 1990s he painted "devotional subjects".

Libraries appear to report that Garrido provided interior as well as cover illustrations for some of the "Susan Sand" mystery stories by Marilyn Ezzell.

== Selected works ==
Wikipedia book articles usually display front cover image of the first editions. Garrido may have provided cover art for a later edition.

- The Anything Box, Zenna Henderson, Avon Books (1965)
- Pilgrimage: The Book of the People, Zenna Henderson, Avon (1967)
- Needle, Hal Clement, Avon (1967)
- The Day New York Trembled, Irwin Lewis, Avon (1967)
- No Blade of Grass, John Christopher, Avon (1967)
- Stranger in a Strange Land, Robert A. Heinlein, Avon (1967)
- Master of Life and Death, Robert Silverberg, Avon (1968)
- The People: No Different Flesh, Zenna Henderson, Avon (1968)
- Now Then!, John Brunner, Avon (1968)
- The Little People, John Christopher, Avon (1968)
- The Pedestal, George Lanning, Avon (1968)
- Witch Bane, Robert Neill, Avon (1968)
- The Devil His Due, edited by Douglas Hill, Avon (1969)
- Old House of Fear, Russell Kirk, Avon (1969)
- Night of the Vampire, Raymond Giles, Avon (1969)
- A Stir of Echoes, Richard Matheson, Avon (1969)
- Infernal Idol, Henry Seymour, Avon (1969)
- Unfinished Portrait, Agatha Christie, Dell (April, 1969)
- Baroness novels, Paul Kenyon, Pocket Books (1974–1975)
  - The Ecstasy Connection
  - Diamonds Are for Dying
  - Death Is a Ruby Light
  - Hard-core Murder
  - Operation Doomsday
  - Sonic Slave
  - Flicker of Doom
  - Black Gold
- Lodge Sinister, Dana Ross, Pocket Books (1975)
- Night Shade, Dorothy Daniels, Pocket Books (1976)
- The Parasite, Ramsey Campbell, Macmillan (1980)
- Race Against Time, Carolyn Keene, Grosset & Dunlap (1982)
- Forgetting Places, S. P. Somtow, Tor Books (1987)
- Blood Farm, Sam Siciliano, Pageant Books (1988)
- Death Angel, Robert Black, Pageant (1988)
- The Curse, Carl Sherrell, Pageant (1989)
- Summer of Night, Dan Simmons, Putnam (1991)
- Children of the Night, Dan Simmons, Putnam (1992)
- Raven, Charles L. Grant, Tor (1993)
- Fires of Eden, Dan Simmons, Putnam (1994)
