= The Genesis Quest =

1986 novel by Donald Moffitt

- First edition
- Author: Donald Moffitt
- Cover artist: Ralph McQuarrie
- Language: English
- Genre: Science fiction
- Publication date: 1986
- Publication place: United States
- Media type: Print (Paperback)
- ISBN: 978-0743458337
- Followed by: Second Genesis

The Genesis Quest is a 1986 science fiction novel by American writer Donald Moffitt. It is part of a two-part series, the conclusion of the story being offered in Second Genesis.

== Plot summary ==
An alien race (The Nar) assemble humans from a stream of genetic information transmitted by radio from the Milky Way Galaxy. The resulting colony of humans spend some time integrated into the Nar society before growing restless, discovering the secret of human longevity, and embarking on the seemingly impossible millennia-long mission of a physical journey back to Earth. This epic journey is made in a gigantic space-grown semi-sentient Dyson tree known as Yggdrasil.

== Critical reception ==
Wiley Hall III of The Evening Sun wrote that "the science in this novel is convincing, and the conflict between Nar and humans is fascinating."
