= Torchy (comics) =

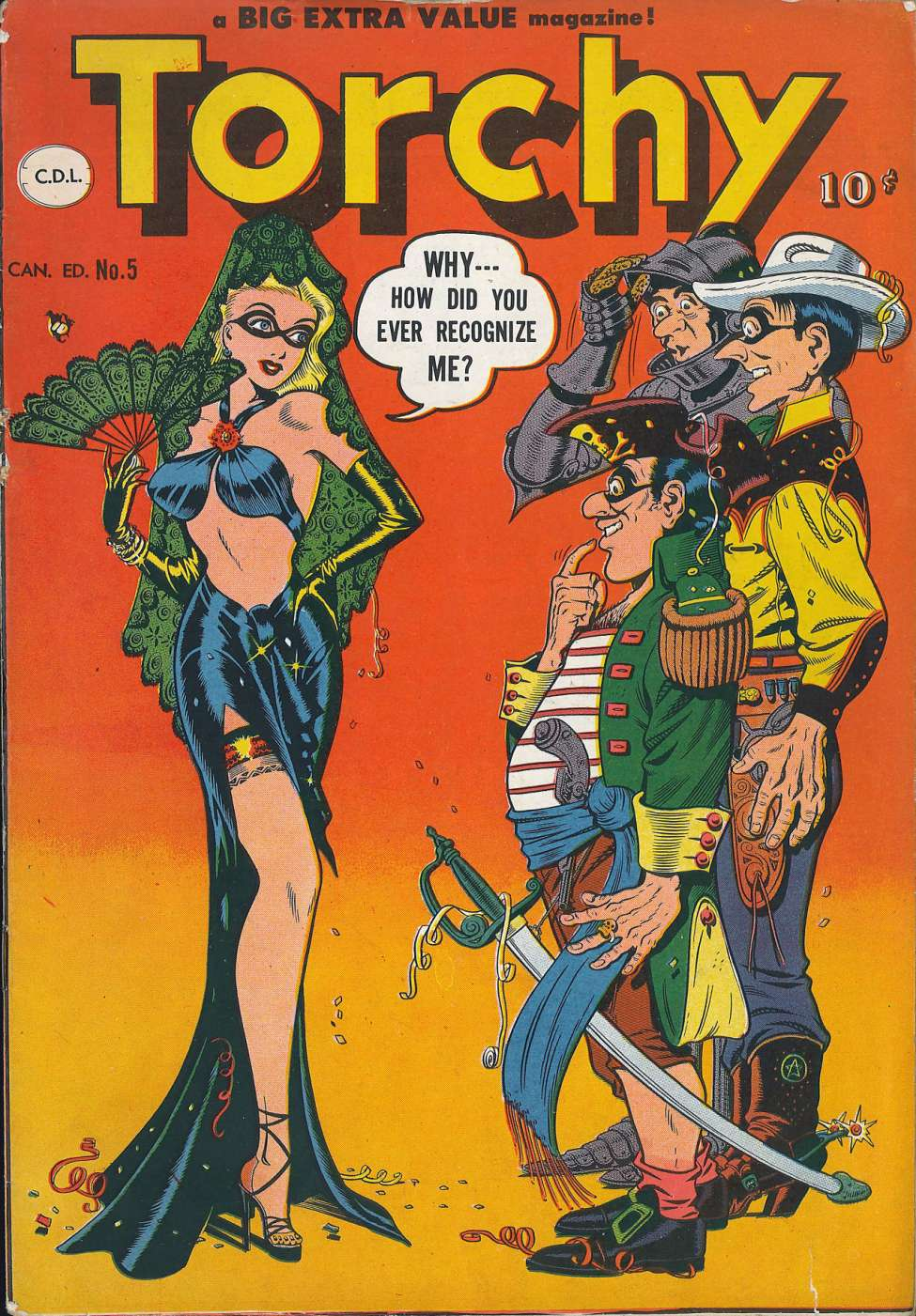
- Torchy #5 (July 1950), cover art by Bill Ward

Publication information
- Publisher: Quality Comics
- First appearance: Comic strip: Fort Hamilton base newspaper (1944); Comics: Doll Man #8 (Spring 1946)
- Created by: Bill Ward

In-story information
- Full name: Torchy Todd
Torchy
- Publication date: Nov. 1949 – Sept. 1950
Collected editions
- Bill Ward's Torchy, vol. 1: ISBN 1-56685-048-7
- Bill Ward's Torchy, vol. 2: ISBN 1566850576

Torchy is a comic strip and, primarily, a series of comic books featuring the ingenue Torchy Todd, created by the American "good girl art" cartoonist Bill Ward during 1944. The character was ranked 97th of the 2011 Comics Buyer's Guide's "100 Sexiest Women in Comics" list.

== Publication history ==
After Bill Ward's drafting into the World War II military, the artist created the tall, blond, busty ingenue Torchy Todd for the base newspaper of Brooklyn's Fort Hamilton, where Ward was deployed. The comic strip in which she appeared soon became distributed in other military newspapers around the world.

Torchy made her comic-book debut as main character of a backup feature of Quality Comics' Doll Man #8 (Spring 1946). Her feature was later published in all but two issues through #30 (September 1950), resuming in #35 (August 1951) through #47 (October 1953), as well as in Modern Comics #53-102 (Sept. 1946 – Oct. 1950). A solo series, Torchy, had six issues (Nov. 1949 – Sept. 1950), some with art by Gill Fox.

Several Torchy stories, including some Fort Hamilton comic strips, were reprinted in Innovation Comics' 100-page, squarebound trade paperback Bill Ward's Torchy, The Blonde Bombshell #1 (Jan. 1992). Others have been reprinted in The Betty Pages #1 (1987); AC Comics anthology Good Girl Art Quarterly #1 (Summer 1990), #10 (Fall 1992), #11 (Winter 1993), and #14 (Winter 1994), and in AC's America's Greatest Comics #5 (circa 2003). Comic Images released a set of Torchy trading cards in 1994.

Ward drew an original cover featuring Torchy for Robert M. Overstreet's annual book The Comic Book Price Guide (#8, 1978).

== Character biography ==
Torchy Todd is a ditsy but goodhearted young blond woman who frequently finds herself in humorous, mildly risqué encounters with lustful men.
