= Voodoo lily =

Voodoo lily is a common name for several plants and may refer to:

- Amorphophallus, a genus of some 170 tropical and subtropical tuberous herbaceous plants of the Arum family
- Dracunculus vulgaris or dragon arum, a native of Europe
- Sauromatum venosum, is a common shade loving house or garden plant
