= Fires of Eden (novel) =

Novel by Dan Simmons

- Hardcover edition
- Author: Dan Simmons
- Cover artist: Hector Garrido
- Language: English
- Subject: History and mythology of Hawaii
- Publisher: Putnam Publishing Group
- Publication date: October 27, 1994
- Publication place: United States
- Media type: Print
- Pages: 399 pp. (hardcover)
- ISBN: 978-0399139222

Fires of Eden is a novel by American writer Dan Simmons, published in 1994. It centres on the history and mythology of Hawaii, the moral and ethical issues of the United States occupation of Hawaii, and various other issues.

== Overview ==
Fires of Eden takes place around the adventures of two different generations, a woman and her niece. The aunt's story is told as a series of journal entries, said journal being in her niece's possession. The book also uses as a main character Samuel Clemens, better known as Mark Twain. Additionally, this novel features two characters from Simmons' Summer of Night (1991), Cordie Cook and Mike O'Rourke; the latter has only a "bit part" near the end.
