= Double Agent (TV series) =

- Also known as: Shtula
- Created by: Zvi Yehezkeli
- Country of origin: Israel
- Original language: Hebrew
- No. of episodes: 5

Original release
- Network: Channel 13 (Israel)

Double Agent (or "Shtula", in Hebrew שתולה) is a five-part Israeli documentary series. The series was produced by the head of the Arab affairs desk at the Israeli Channel 13, & Commentator on Arab affairs and host of a program on i24 News, Zvi Yehezkeli. Yehezkali in collaboration with the organization "Ad Kan" reveals authentic documentation about what goes on behind the scenes of the human rights organizations operating in the Palestinian Authority, and shows how their war of consciousness against Israel is conducted.

The series introduces R (pseudonym), a 32-year-old pro-Palestinian Swedish girl who came to Israel as a tourist to study architecture, and during her stay in Israel she meets a man from the Eli settlement who explains to her the Israeli angle to the Israeli-Palestinian conflict.

The Swedish girl stirs within the Palestinian organizations and actually becomes an intelligence agent. After a year, she meets with members of the terrorist organization Hamas. Hamas officials reveal to her the fundraising mechanism, and the connection between the Muslim Brotherhood and the Hamas headquarters in Europe and human rights organizations, which indicates that human rights organizations such as BDS are operated by Hamas personnel.

Amongst her footages, she had recorded the activists of the International Solidarity Movement speak about how they wish they could destroy Israel with a massive bombing, and kill all of its people despite describing themselves as "peace activists". In another encounter with the ISM activists, one of them tells her that she helped Palestinian children throw rocks at Israeli drivers from a close by hill, and that the IDF soldiers did "what necessary to prevent them from continuing" but added that they must not publish this, as this will harm the Palestinians' narrative and public image and "will strengthen Israel".

R was operated by the "Ad Kan" organization in the five years preceding the production of the series.

The documentation on which the series is built includes 3000 hours of photography.
