= Biographic leverage =

Biographic leverage is a term used in the field of espionage to describe a form of blackmail in which a piece of negative information about an individual is used as leverage to persuade them to do something they are reluctant to do or to disclose secret information. This information could be about events in the individual's past, or their current personal life. Details of criminal activities or marital infidelity are common forms of biographic leverage; recruitment as a spy is a frequent goal of such activity. For example, the fact that William G. Sebold had been prosecuted for petty theft was used as biographic leverage by Abwehr to persuade him to be involved in undercover intelligence work in the 1940s.

An attempt to gain leverage material on a heterosexual male target through entrapment of a sexual nature by a female operative is called a honeytrap, honeypot, or swallow; an attempt to gain leverage material on a homosexual male target through entrapment of a sexual nature by a male operative is called a raven. Attempts of this nature are so frequent and routine and taken so unseriously by the experienced HUMINT operator that the target is often better off reporting the leverage attempt to their handler/operator and letting the experienced professional deal with the attack than submit to the coercive force.
