= Second Genesis (novel) =

1986 novel by Donald Moffitt

- Cover of the first edition
- Author: Donald Moffitt
- Language: English
- Genre: Science fiction
- Publication date: 1986
- Publication place: United States
- Media type: Print (Paperback)
- ISBN: 978-0747400165

Second Genesis is a 1986 science fiction novel by American author Donald Moffitt.

In the previous novel, The Genesis Quest (1986), the alien Nar species discovered radio transmissions containing the genetic codes and cultural records of a species called Humanity, transmitted from a distant galaxy. Now the humans created with this information have discovered the biochemical key to immortality, and have decided to dedicate their now-long lives to discovering their origins in the distant Milky Way. They create a starship using a Dyson tree called Yggdrasil, bound to a Bussard ramjet, to search for the world of their ancestors, and wind up discovering both ancient wonders and a disturbing new threat; a predatory species that cannot share the universe with anyone.
