= Donald Moffitt =

American writer

- Born: July 20, 1931; Boston, Massachusetts, US
- Died: December 10, 2014 (aged 83); Monroe, Maine, US
- Writing career
- Pen name: Donald Moffitt, Paul Kenyon, Victor Sondheim, Paul King

Donald Moffitt (July 20, 1931 – December 10, 2014) was an American author who published several science fiction novels. Most famous among these are The Genesis Quest and Second Genesis. While he was the author of stories using his own name he also used the pseudonyms Paul Kenyon, Victor Sondheim, and Paul King. During the 1950s, Moffitt published approximately 100 short stories using 15 or more pseudonyms (including Wilson MacDonald, James D’Indy, and an assortment of others), for magazines like Gent, Man's Action, Monsieur, and Wildcat, while editing trade magazines by day. Known for his science fiction, Moffitt later published some historical mysteries.

== Bibliography ==
=== As Donald Moffitt ===
==== Short fiction ====
- The Devil's Due (Fantastic Science Fiction Stories, May 1960; reprinted in Strange Fantasy, Fall 1969)
- The Scroll (The Magazine of Fantasy and Science Fiction, May 1972)
- The Man Who Was Beethoven (The Magazine of Fantasy and Science Fiction, December 1972)
- Literacy (Analog Science Fiction and Fact, April 1994)
- The Beethoven Project (Analog Science Fiction and Fact, April 2008)
- Feat of Clay (Alfred Hitchcock's Mystery Magazine, September 2008)
- The Affair of the Phlegmish Master (Analog Science Fiction and Fact, June 2009)
- Deadly Passage (Alfred Hitchcock's Mystery Magazine, November 2009)
- A Death in Samoa (Alfred Hitchcock's Mystery Magazine, October 2011)
- A Snitch in Time (Analog Science Fiction and Fact, January–February 2011)
- The Color of Gold (Alfred Hitchcock's Mystery Magazine, March 2015)
- A Handful of Clay (Alfred Hitchcock's Mystery Magazine, July–August 2015)

==== Novels ====
- The Jupiter Theft (1977)
- Jovian (2003)
- Children of the Comet (2015, published posthumously) (Note: Briefly reviewed by Don Sakers in the April 2016 issue of Analog, pp.105–108.)

===== Genesis Series =====
- The Genesis Quest (1986)
- Second Genesis (1986)

===== Mechanical Sky Series =====
1. Crescent in the Sky (1989)
2. A Gathering of Stars (1990)

=== As Paul Kenyon ===
Also, as "Paul Kenyon", a house pseudonym of Book Creations, Inc., he published The Baroness, an adult spy thriller series.

- The Baroness: The Ecstacy Connection (Pocket Books, 1974, #1)
- The Baroness: Diamonds are for Dying (Pocket Books, 1974, #2)
- The Baroness: Death is a Ruby Light (Pocket Books, 1974, #3)
- The Baroness: Hard-core Murder (Pocket Books, 1974, #4)
- The Baroness: Operation Doomsday (Pocket Books, 1974, #5)
- The Baroness: Sonic Slave (Pocket Books, 1974, #6)
- The Baroness: Flicker of Doom (Pocket Books, 1974, #7)
- The Baroness: Black Gold (Pocket Books, 1975, #8)
- (unpublished) The Baroness: A Black Hole to Die In
- (unpublished) The Baroness: Death is a Copycat

=== As Victor Sondheim ===
- Inheritors of the Storm (1981)
- (unpublished) Swimmers in the Tide

=== As Paul King ===
==== Dreamers Trilogy ====
- Dreamers (1992)
- The Voyagers (1993)
- The Discoverers (1994)

———————

Bibliography notes
