= The Baroness (novels) =

Series of espionage novels by Paul Kenyon

- The first Baroness novel. Cover by Hector Garrido
- The Ecstasy Connection; Diamonds Are for Dying; Death Is a Ruby Light; Hard-core Murder; Operation Doomsday; Sonic Slave; Flicker of Doom; Black Gold
- Author: Paul Kenyon
- Country: United States
- Language: English
- Genre: Spy fiction Erotica
- Publisher: Pocket Books
- Published: 1974–1975
- Media type: Print (Paperback)

The Baroness is a series of espionage novels by Donald Moffitt under the pseudonym Paul Kenyon. Eight novels in the series were published from 1974 to 1975 by Pocket Books. This series of books profiles the adventures of Baroness Penelope St. John-Orsini, a voluptuous international playgirl who is also a lethal secret superspy.

== Fictional character biography ==
A former Vogue and Elle cover model, the Baroness is a "long-legged beauty in her early thirties" who runs a model agency as a cover for her espionage missions. Her preferred weapon is the Bernardelli VB .25 caliber.

She drinks martini cocktails, smokes the occasional joint, drives a red Porsche, throws lavish parties in her Rome mansion and enjoys fiery but casual sex with a series of handsome hunks, including suspected enemies she may well have to kill. Her jade green eyes, raven black hair and "explicit cheekbones" prove the perfect smokescreen. "There wasn't a line or shadow on her lovely face to show the deadly secrets that lay behind it."

== Origins ==
Born Penelope Worthington into a Philadelphia banking family, she was educated at Miss Frothingham's Finishing School. Her father was Arthur Worthington and she sometimes recalls his wisdom with fondness. While still young, she married an older man John Stanton Marlowe, who performed "mysterious errands" for the US government. The marriage was short-lived. He died while piloting his own Gulfstream jet.

She turned to modeling and while on assignment in Italy met the Baron Reynaldo St. John Orsini, a thrill-seeking playboy. It was the Baron who "brought her to life again." Their three-year marriage was a whirlwind of jet-setting parties, fast cars and scuba diving. "Life,” he tells her, “is keener when death is looking over your shoulder."

Following a tire blow-out on his Ferrari, the Baron died in the Monte Carlo Grand Prix. Penelope inherited his money, becoming independently wealthy, but for the second time found life a "void." That is, until a government friend of her first husband recruited her. Over two years, she was trained in weaponry, close combat and martial arts, learning how to pass out under interrogation and kill a man with a hairpin.

== The books ==
Eight Baroness novels were published within the space of one year (1974–1975) by Pocket Books, all credited to Paul Kenyon, a house pseudonym used by book packager Lyle Kenyon Engel for Donald Moffitt. The book covers were illustrated by Hector Garrido. The titles were:

1. The Ecstasy Connection
2. Diamonds Are for Dying
3. Death Is a Ruby Light
4. Hard-core Murder
5. Operation Doomsday
6. Sonic Slave
7. Flicker of Doom
8. Black Gold

In 1975, Futura reprinted only the first four books in England, with different covers.

French translations were published in 1975 by Eroscope under a different series name, "Penny", the nickname of the protagonist in the novels. Eroscope published all eight novels listed above and a ninth, Photo-Phobie, which was never published in English.

Due to the high volume of output in such a short period of time under the Kenyon name, speculations abound whether Kenyon was one author or if this was a pseudonym for more than one writer, a common practice of using house pseudonyms in adventure fiction at that time. Some authors have said that Paul Kenyon was indeed a "house" name used by a book packager Lyle Kenyon Engel, of Book Creations, Inc. However, Donald Moffitt admitted that he was the sole author of the eight published Baroness novels.

Engel contracted and paid for three more Baroness titles, but these were never published. Peter Mayer of Simon and Schuster, a division of Pocket Books, canceled the series after the three manuscripts were written. He thought that action/adventure series were not selling enough in numbers to keep it going. The unpublished titles were:

1. A Black Hole to Die In by Donald Moffitt
2. Death Is a Copycat by Donald Moffitt
3. Quicktime Death by Robert Vardeman in 1976

== The pulp tradition ==
Published at a time when male characters such as Nick Carter-Killmaster and Mack Bolan dominated the paperback spy genre, The Baroness series distinguished itself by featuring an equally lethal and promiscuous female character.

The novels' sex scenes contain many examples of the graphically poetic pulp tradition:

- "She opened her mouth and the tongue, like a sly little animal, darted in."
- "His tool grew in her hand until it was a rigid club, hot and heavy to the touch..."
- "The livid pipe still protruded straight out, glistening with their mingled secretions."
- "She flicked it downward to the slippery underside and found it muscularly imprisoned."
- "Penelope felt an electric shock travel downward through the center of her body to where she was plastered wetly to the padded barstool."
- "They lay side by side like exhausted wrestlers... a single sparkling droplet trying to ooze out of his blunt tip."

== See also ==
- Modesty Blaise
