= Red crowberry =

Red crowberry is a common name for red berries bore by several species of flowering plants in the genus Empetrum, and may refer to:

- Empetrum eamesii, native to northeastern North America
- Empetrum rubrum, native to the Falkland Islands and southern South America
