= Böstlingen =

Coordinates: 52°49′30″N 9°41′35″E

Böstlingen was a village in the old district (Altkreis) of Fallingbostel, located in the Heidmark in the north German state of Lower Saxony. In 1935/36 it was abandoned because the German Wehrmacht wanted to establish a major military training area, the Truppenübungsplatz Bergen on the heath and forest of the Heidmark. The inhabitants were forcibly resettled.

== History ==
Böstlingen was first documented in 1378. In the Celle treasury register (Schatzregister) in 1438 there is mention of 3 farms at Böstlingen. For centuries heath farmers earned a living here by keeping moorland sheep, known as Heidschnucken. Not until the 19th century, when they succeeded in breaking up the hardpan and cultivating arable land, did sheep farming decline.

A parish was created, based on the village of Böstlingen, which included the neighbouring villages of Böstlingen, Fahrenholz, Pröbsten and Deil. At the time of the resettlement there were 208 parishioners.

Tradition has it that there were earth cellars (Erdkeller) in Böstlingen.

== Sources ==
- Hinrich Baumann: Die Heidmark - Wandel einer Landschaft. Geschichte des Truppenübungsplatzes Bergen. 2006
- Hans Stuhlmacher: Die Heidmark. Schneeheide 1939
