= Pröbsten =

Coordinates: 52°50′04″N 9°43′04″E

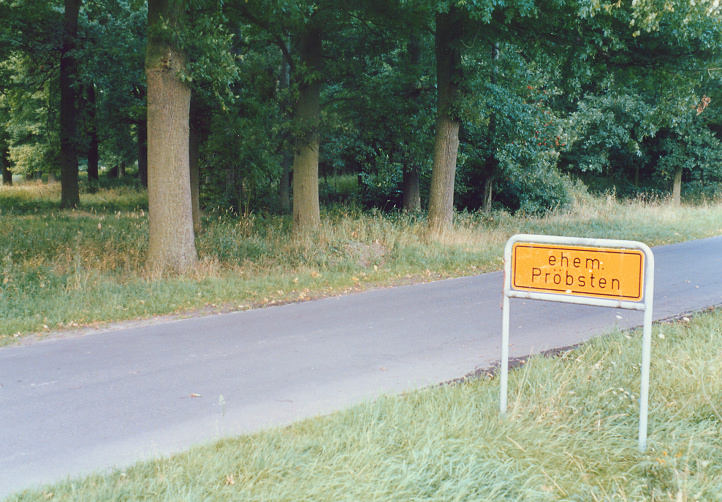
Village sign on the new bypass road, 1985

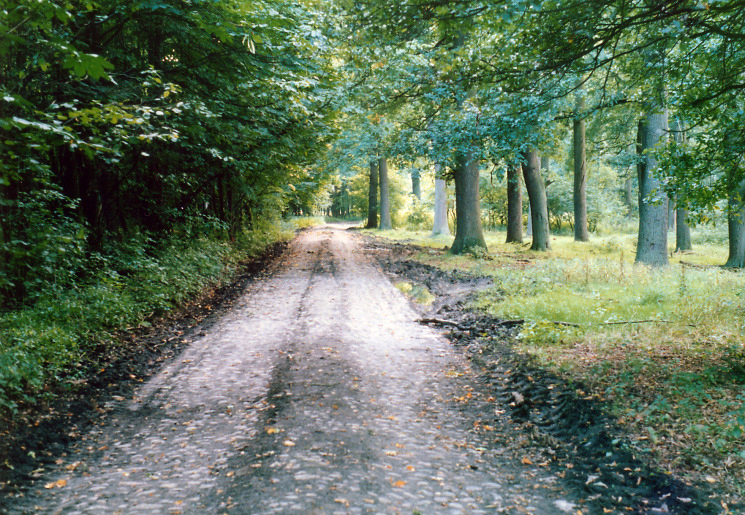
Old village street with cobblestones, 1985

Pröbsten was a village in the former district (Altkreis) of Fallingbostel, located in the Heidmark in the German state of Lower Saxony. Its inhabitants were resettled in 1935/36, because the German Wehrmacht wanted to establish a major military training area, the Truppenübungsplatz Bergen, on the heathland and forest of the Heidmark.

== History ==
Pröbsten was first mentioned in the records in 1337. It has been documented that there was a noble family named von Pröbsten. Pröbsten was home to heath farmers. It is likely that the keeping of moorland sheep, known locally as Heidschnucken, that were common in the area until the 19th century.

Pröbsten was eventually grouped together with the villages of Fahrenholz and Deil into the parish of Böstlingen. At the time of the resettlement in 1935/36 208 inhabitants lived in Pröbsten.

After the Second World War Heimatvertriebene were accommodated in the buildings that were left.

== Sources ==
- Hinrich Baumann: Die Heidmark - Wandel einer Landschaft, Geschichte des Truppenübungsplatzes Bergen, 2006
- Hans Stuhlmacher: Die Heidmark, Schneeheide 1939
