= Bockhorn =

Bockhorn may refer to:

- Bockhorn, Bavaria, in the district of Erding, Bavaria, Germany
- Bockhorn, Lower Saxony, in the district of Friesland, Lower Saxony, Germany
- Bockhorn (Walsrode), a parish in the district of Heidekreis, Lower Saxony, Germany
- Bukkehorn, an ancient Scandinavian musical instrument, known as "bockhorn" in Swedish and "bukkehorn" in Norwegian
