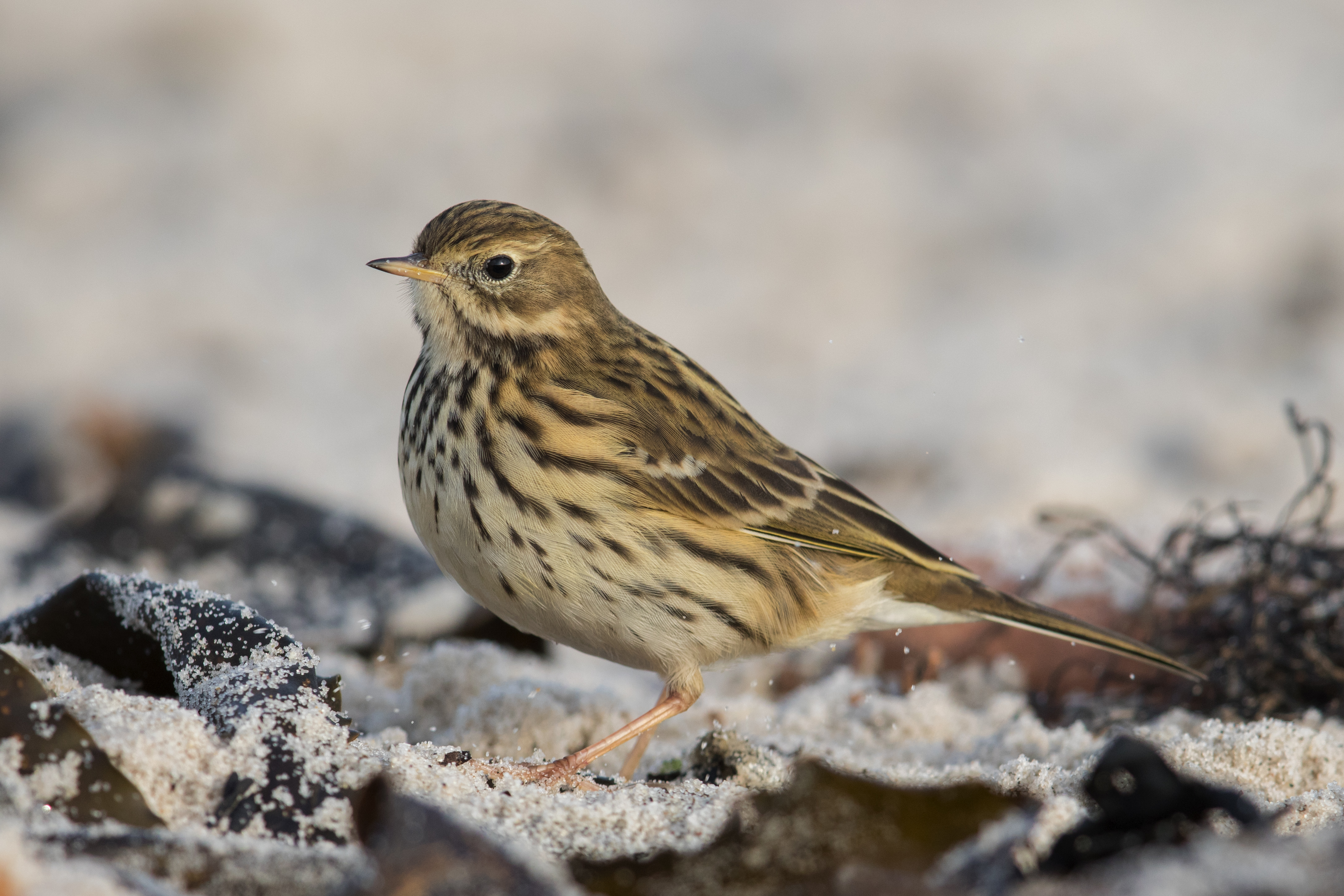

Conservation status
- Least Concern (IUCN 3.1)

Scientific classification
- Kingdom: Animalia
- Phylum: Chordata
- Class: Aves
- Order: Passeriformes
- Family: Motacillidae
- Genus: Anthus
- Species: A. pratensis

Binomial name
- Anthus pratensis (Linnaeus, 1758)
- Range of A. pratensis Breeding Resident Passage Non-breeding

Synonyms
- Alauda pratensis Linnaeus, 1758

Audio
- Bird recorded in Surrey, England

= Meadow pipit =

Species of bird

The meadow pipit (Anthus pratensis) is a small passerine bird that breeds throughout much of the Palearctic, from south-eastern Greenland and Iceland east to just east of the Ural Mountains in Russia, and south to central France and Romania; an isolated population also occurs in the Caucasus Mountains. It is migratory over most of its range, wintering in southern Europe, North Africa, and south-western Asia, but is resident year-round in western Europe, although even here many birds move to the coast or lowlands in winter.

== Taxonomy ==
The meadow pipit was formally described by Swedish naturalist Carl Linnaeus in 1758 in the 10th edition of his Systema Naturae under the binomial name Alauda pratensis. The type locality is Sweden. The meadow pipit is now the type species of the genus Anthus that was introduced in 1805 by German naturalist Johann Matthäus Bechstein. The species is monotypic; no subspecies are recognised.

The generic name Anthus is the Latin name for a small grassland bird mentioned by Pliny the Elder, and the specific name pratensis means "of a meadow ", from pratum, "meadow". The name "pipit", first documented by Thomas Pennant in 1768, is onomatopoeic, from the call note of this species. Old folk names, no longer used, include "chit lark", "peet lark", "tit lark", and "titling"; these refer to its small size and superficial resemblance to a lark.

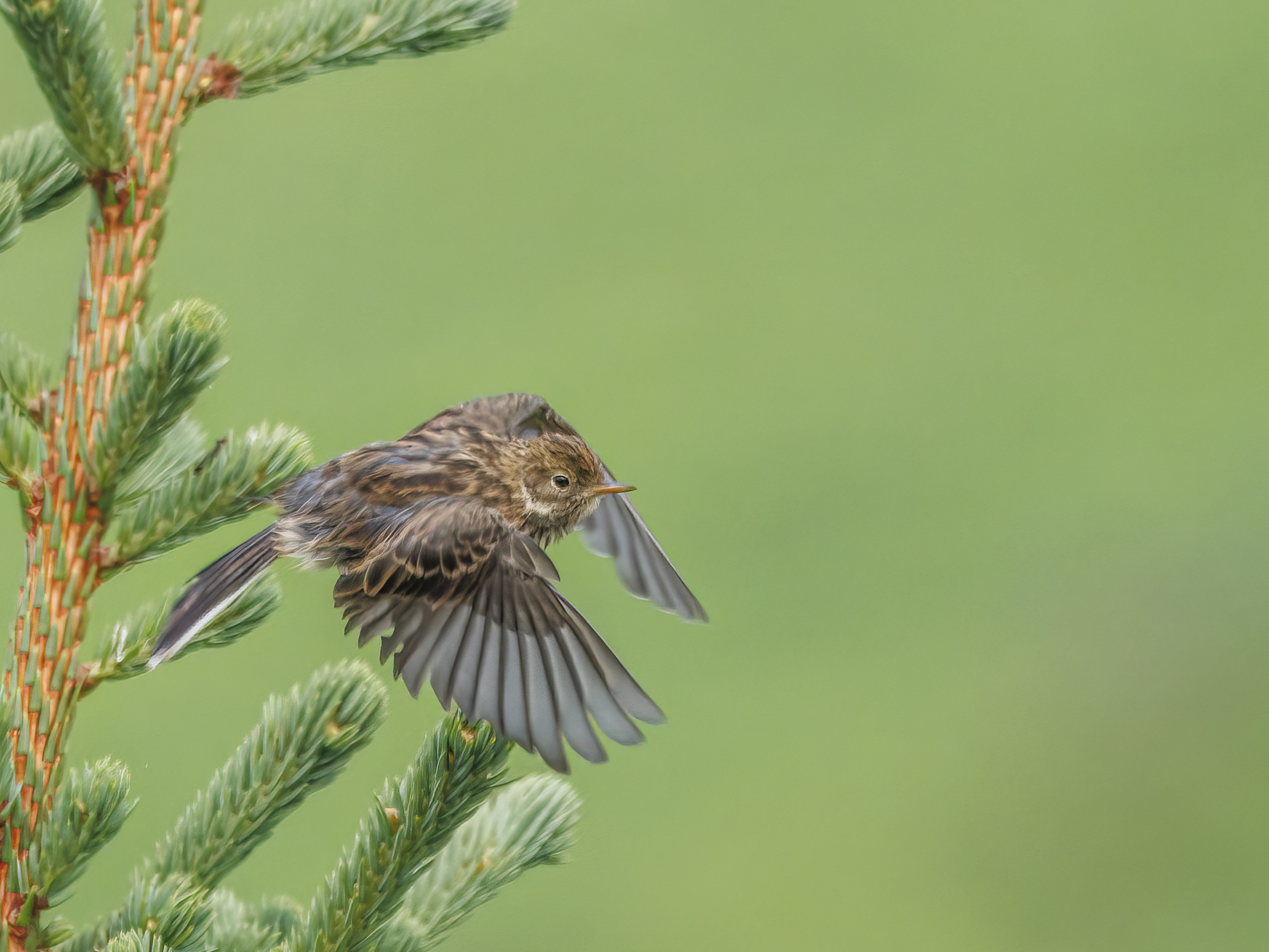
A. p. whistleri

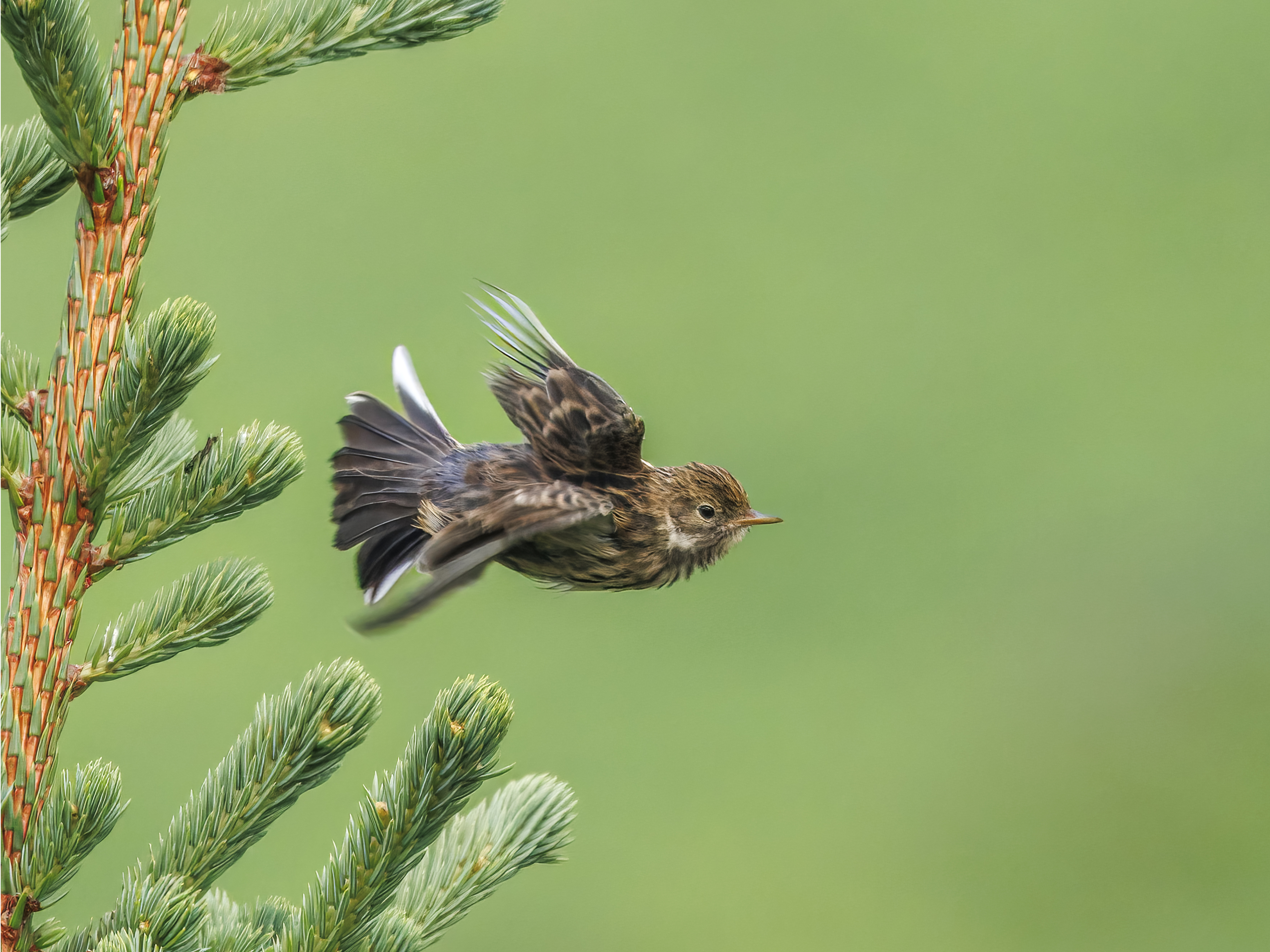
in Iceland

== Description ==
This is a widespread and often abundant small pipit, measuring 14.5–15 cm (5 1/2–6 in) in length and weighing 15–22 g (0.53–0.78 oz). It is an indistinguishable-looking species on the ground, mainly brown above and buff below, with darker barring on most of its plumage; the tail is brown, with narrow white lateral edges. It has a thin bill and pale pinkish yellow legs; the rear claw is conspicuously long, longer than the rest of the rear toes. The call is a faint tsi-tsi. The simple repetitive song is given in a short song flight. Birds breeding in Ireland and western Scotland are slightly darker coloured than those in other areas, and are often distinguished as the subspecies A. p. whistleri, though it intergrades clinally with nominate A. p. pratensis found in the rest of the species' range.

It is similar to the red-throated pipit A. cervinus, which is more heavily barred and (in summer only) has an orange-red throat, and to the tree pipit A. trivialis, which is slightly larger, less heavily streaked, and has stronger facial markings and a shorter rear claw. The song of the meadow pipit accelerates towards the end, while that of the tree pipit slows down.

== Distribution and habitat ==
It is primarily a species of open habitats, either uncultivated or low-intensity agriculture, such as grassland, moorland, and heathland, but also occurs in small numbers on arable land. In winter, it also uses saltmarshes and sometimes open woodland. It is a fairly terrestrial pipit, always feeding on the ground, but using elevated perches such as shrubs, fence lines, or electric wires as vantage points to watch for predators.

The total population is estimated at 12 million pairs. It is an abundant species in the north of its range, and generally the most common breeding bird of the British uplands, but is less common further south. Breeding densities range from 80 pairs/km^{2} (210 pairs/sq mi) in northern Scandinavia, to 5–20 pairs/km^{2} (13–52 pairs/sq mi) in grassland in the south of the breeding range, and just 1/km^{2} (2.6/sq mi) in arable farmland. A few isolated breeding pairs are recorded from south of the main range, in the mountains of Spain, Italy, and the northern Balkans. There has been a general decline in the population over the past 17 years, most notably in French farmland, where the species has declined by 68%.

== Behaviour ==
=== Breeding ===
The nest is on the ground concealed in dense vegetation, with two to seven (usually often three to five) eggs; the eggs hatch after 11–15 days, with the chicks fledging 10–14 days after hatching. Two broods are usually raised each year. This species is one of the most important nest hosts of the cuckoo, and it is also an important prey species for merlins and hen harriers.

=== Food and feeding ===
Its diet mainly consists of insects and other invertebrates, mostly small items less than 5 mm (3/16 in) long. It also eats the seeds of grasses, sedges, rushes, and heather, and crowberry berries, especially in winter.

== Gallery ==
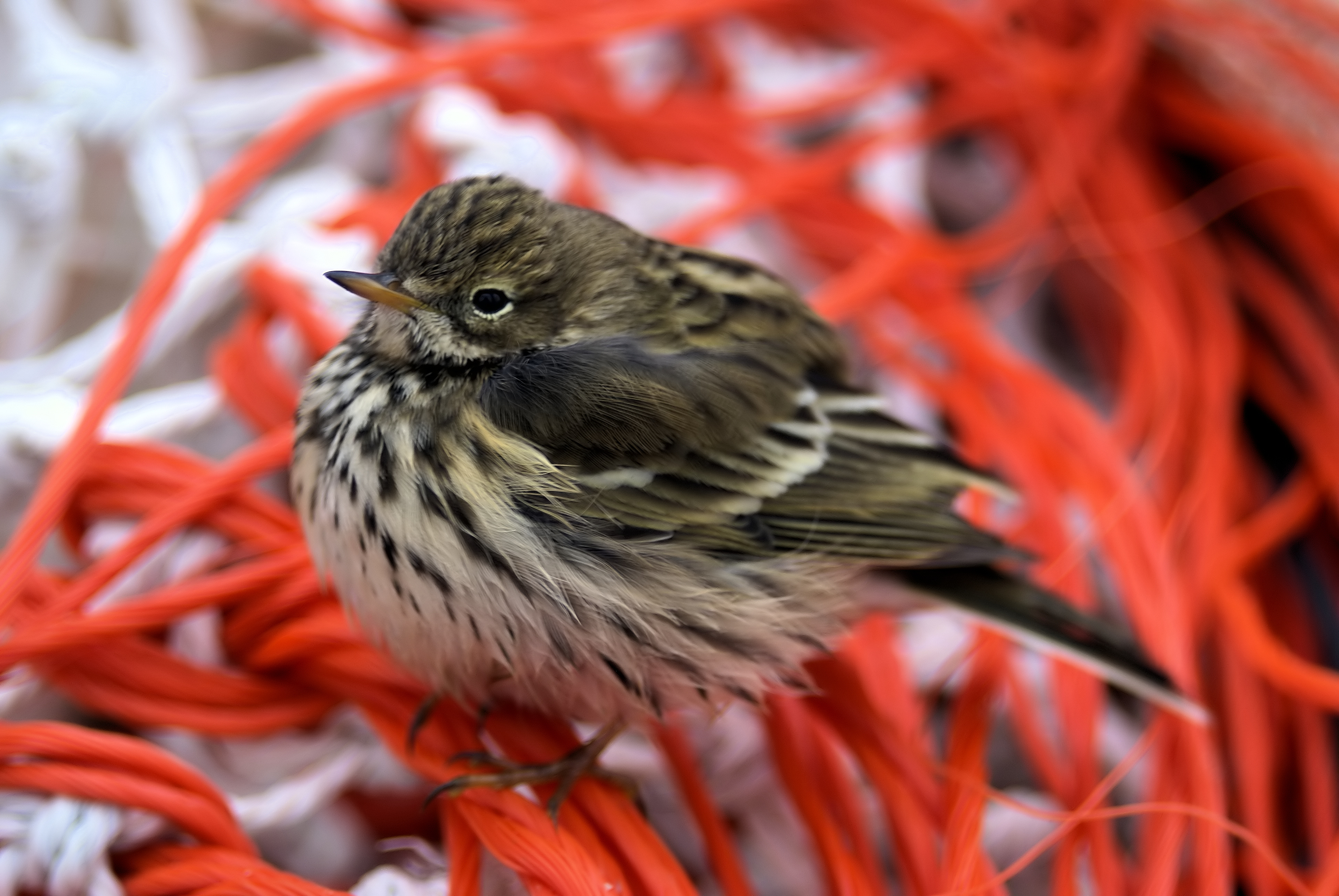
A meadow pipit perched on a fishing net

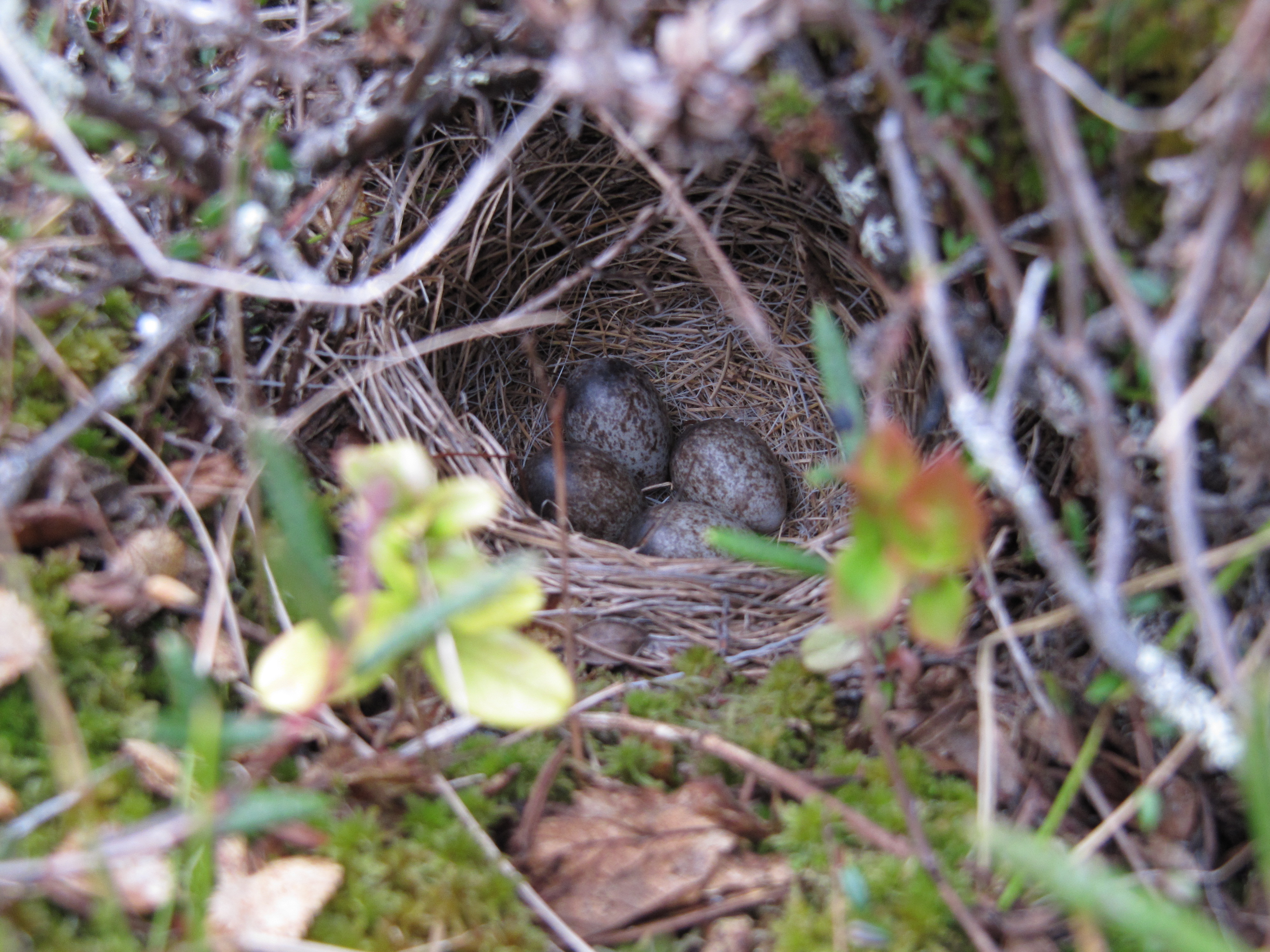
Nest with eggs

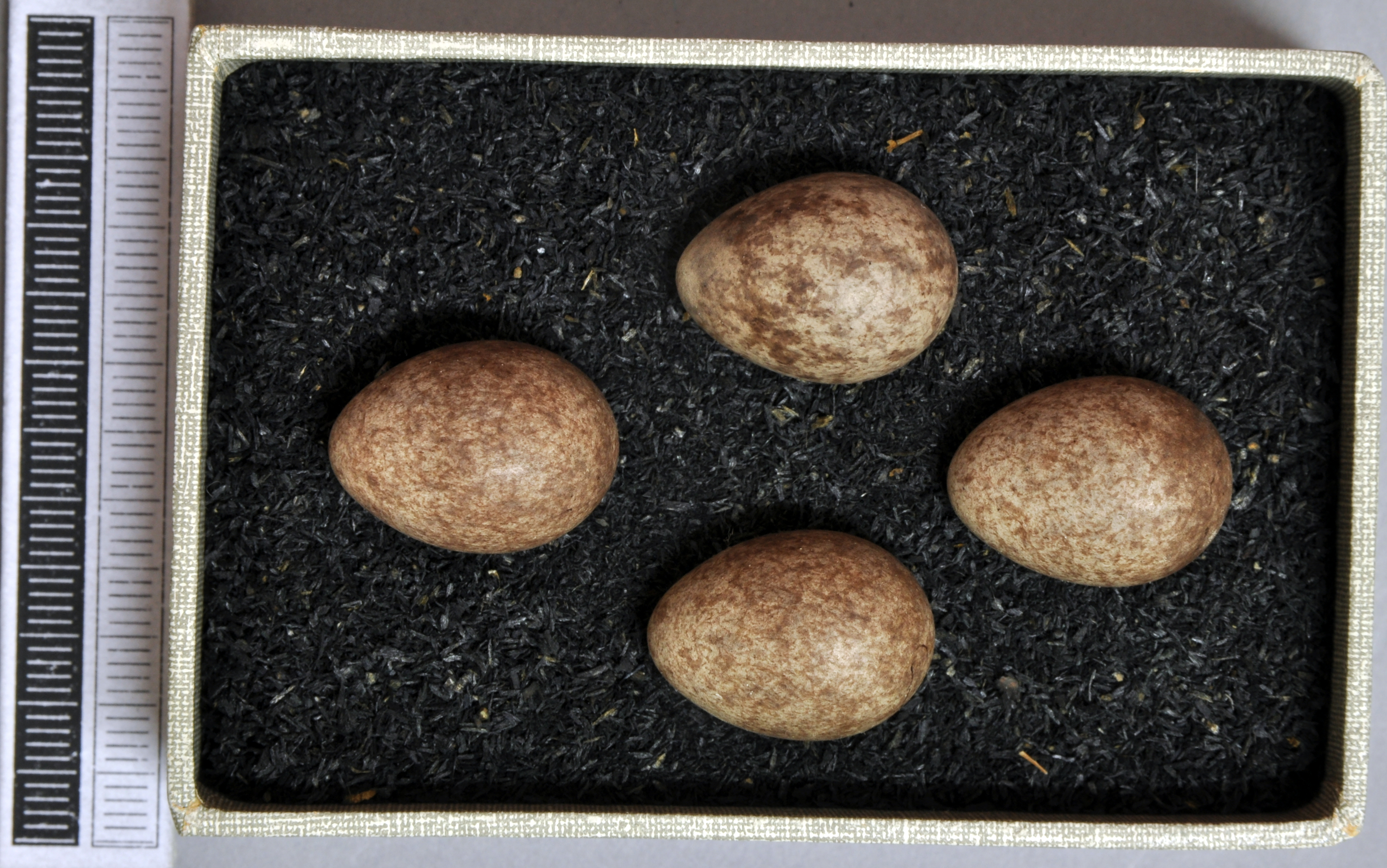
Eggs, Collection Museum Wiesbaden

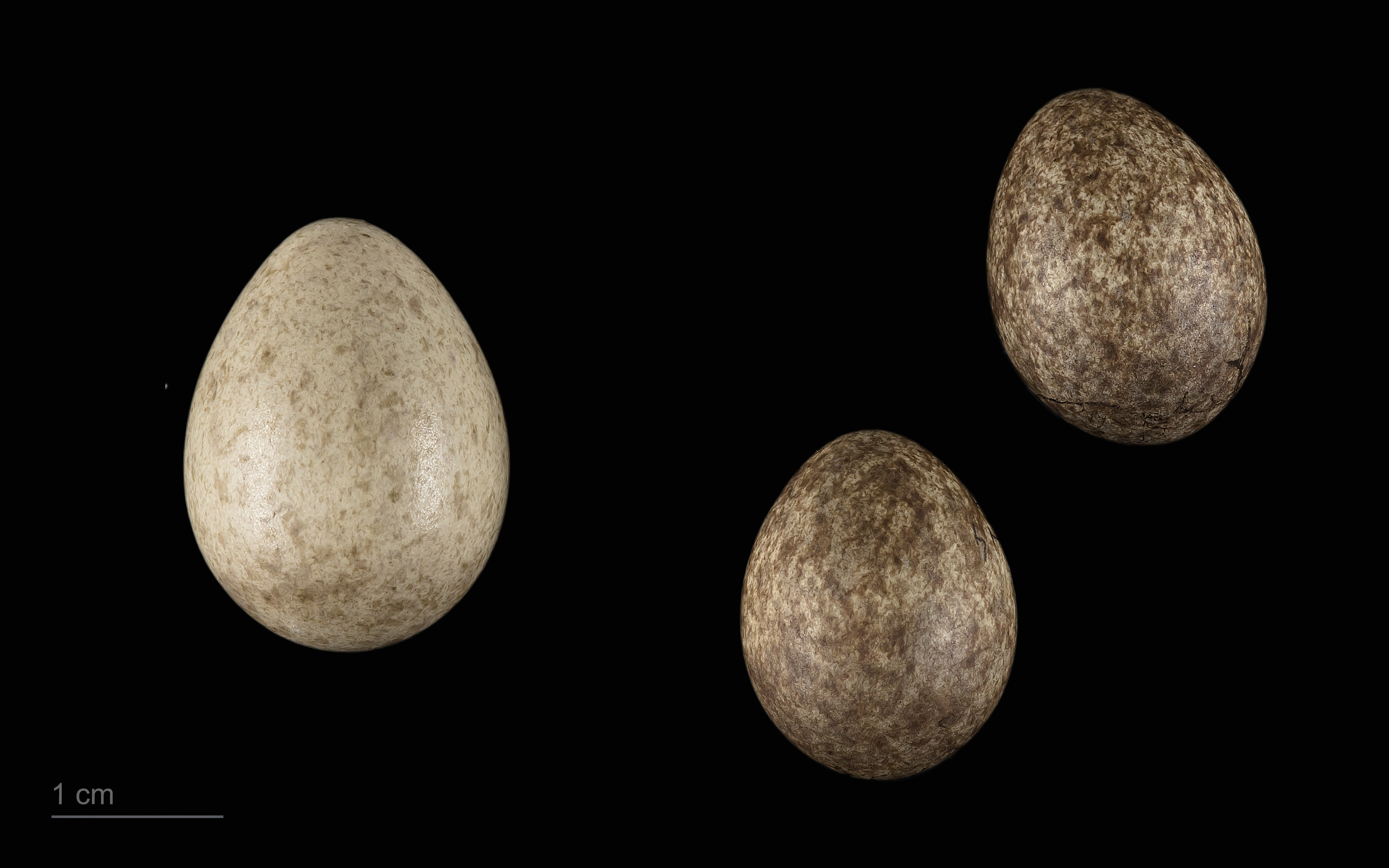
Cuculus canorus canorus in a clutch of Anthus pratensis - MHNT
