= White Polled Heath =

Breed of sheep

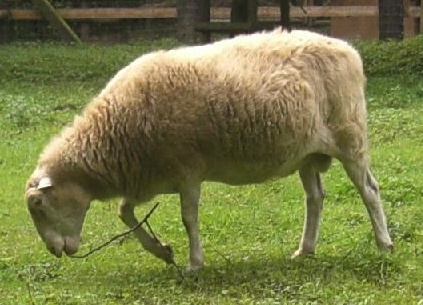
White Polled Heath in the enclosure of Wildfreigehege Bend at Grevenbroich

The White Polled Heath (German: Weiße Hornlose Heidschnucke, also known in Germany as the Moorschnucke) is a small breed and landrace of North German sheep and belongs to the Heidschnucke family, part of the Northern European short-tailed sheep group. However, unlike the other Heidschnucke types, it is entirely white and polled (hornless).

== Origin ==
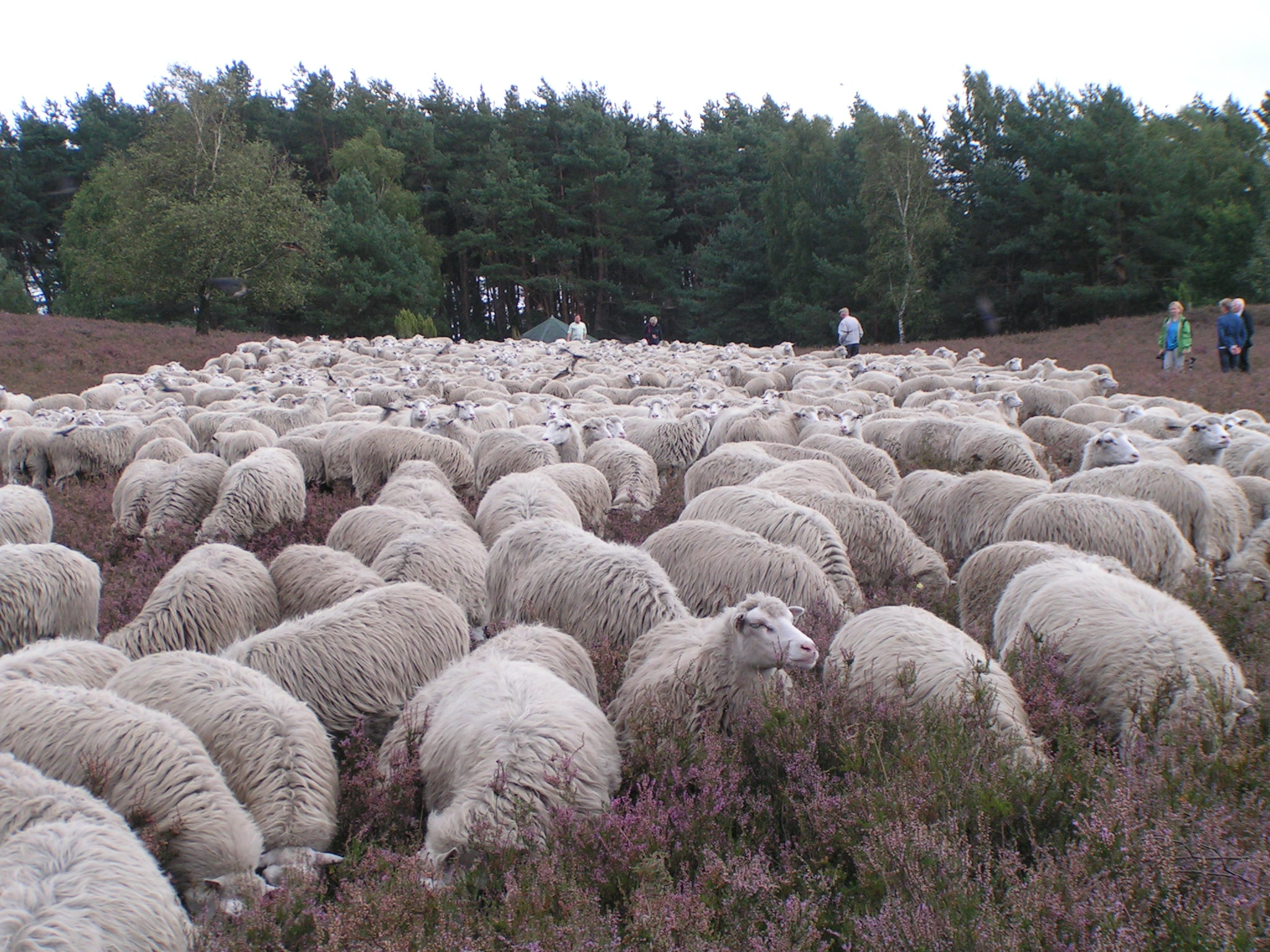
Flock of White Polled Heath sheep on the Kirchdorf Heath

The White Polled Heath originated from the moorlands or bogs of Lower Saxony in North Germany where it has been kept for centuries. It was probably bred by crossing a hornless, plain-wool (schlichtwolligen) landrace with a population of grey, horned Heidschnucke, the German Grey Heath. In 1922 the white hornless Heidschnucke was separated from the horned variety and was then called the Moorschnucke or White Polled Heath.

== Range ==
The White Polled Heath is mainly reared on raised bog regions and dry grasslands in North and Central Germany. Today the White Polled Heath is bred chiefly in the Diepholz moor depression. Its original range was the districts of Diepholz, Nienburg and Rotenburg. The Diepholz Moorschnucke is protected as a regional breed and was registered in European Union's list of products with a Protected Designation of Origin (PDO).

== Diet ==
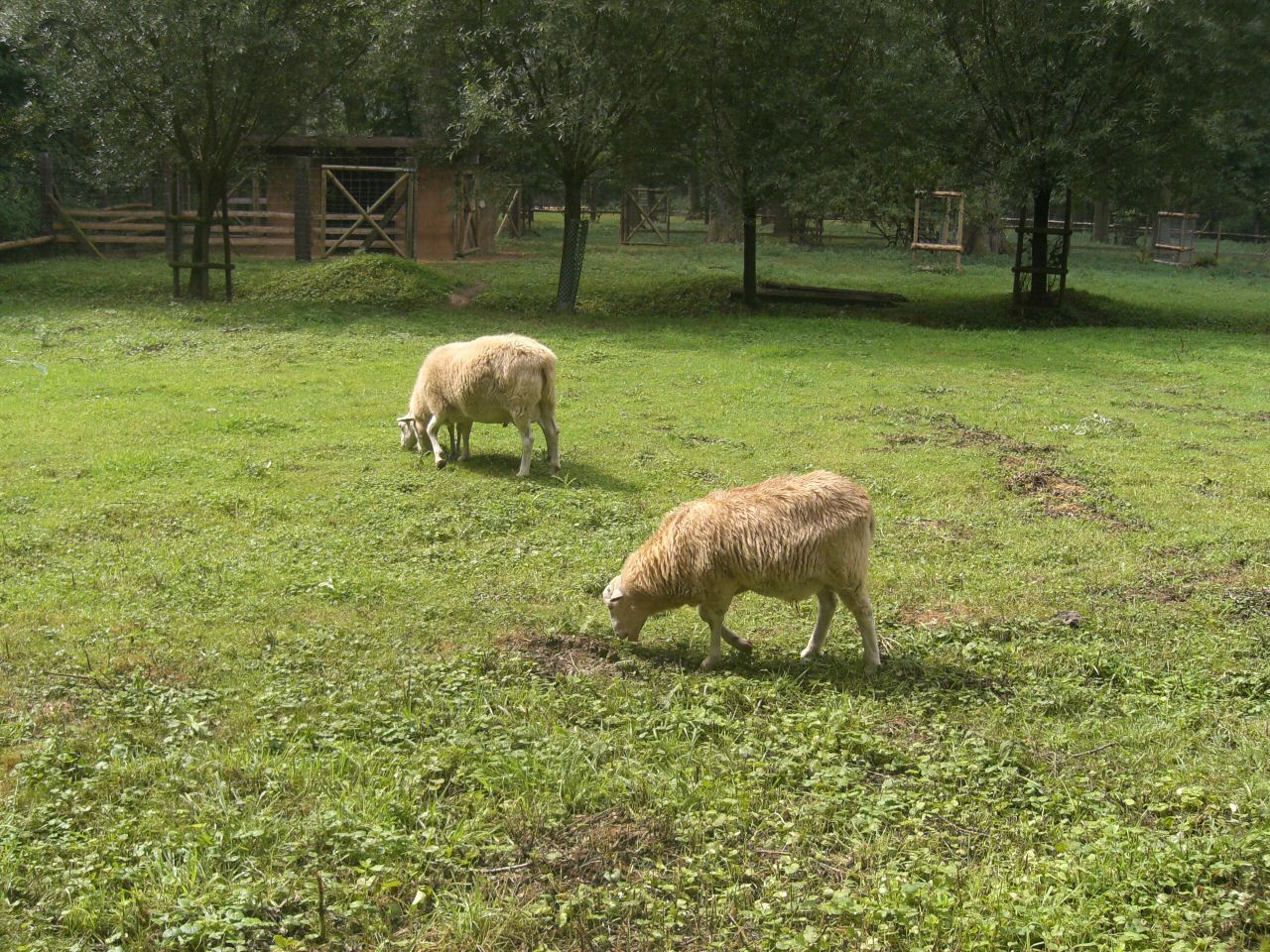
White Polled Heath sheep in the Wildfreigehege Bend at Grevenbroich

The White Polled Heath eats wild plants such as purple moor grass, sedge, sorrel, fungi, mosses, lichens and herbaceous plants such as common heather, bell heather, cross-leaved heath, crowberry, cranberry, bog bilberry, bilberry, pine and birch.

== Characteristics ==
The White Polled Heath is well-suited to life on the moors and is even able, for example, to get itself out of bog holes. It is very hardy and can even walk through knee-high water. It is best suited to nature reserves, conservation areas and grazing of bogs and wet areas. Its meat is considered a delicacy, and is leaner and darker than that of other breeds of sheep. As a result of extensive rearing and feeding the meat retains a spicy, gamey flavour.

== Description ==
The White Polled Heath is a white, dual-coated, graceful landrace with a small frame. Both sexes are hornless with an elongated head and ears that lie at an angle. The bone structure is light and delicate, the hoofs are light-coloured and very hard. The tail is naturally short.

Shoulder height	Ram: 55–60 centimetres (22–24 in), Ewe: 45–50 centimetres (18–20 in)
Weight	Ram: 60–70 kilograms (130–150 lb), Ewe: 40–50 kilograms (88–110 lb)
Horns	Polled
Colour	White
Coat	Mixed wool, wool range DE to E (38-40 micrometres). The outer fleece consists of coarse upper wool, the inner fleece of soft, fine under-wool.

== Endangered status ==
The White Polled Heath is on the list of endangered domestic breeds - and is a "breed under observation" (BEO) according to the red list of the Animal Genetic Resource Consultancy (Fachbeirat Tiergenetische Ressourcen) and is in category III on the red list of the Gesellschaft zur Erhaltung alter und gefährdeter Haustierrassen. The rearing of meat sheep breeds and reduced grazing of the moors have contributed to the White Polled Heath dying out almost entirely.

Through the combined efforts of nature conservationists, the BUND and breeders since 1974 the numbers of White Polled Heath sheep have risen to about 5,000 animals.

== See also ==
- Heidschnucke
- List of sheep breeds
