= Fahrenholz (Heidmark) =

Coordinates: 52°49′15″N 9°41′6″E

Fahrenholz was a village in the former district of Fallingbostel, located in the Heidmark in the German state of Lower Saxony. It was abandoned in 1935/1936 when the German Wehrmacht created the Bergen Training Area. Its inhabitants were resettled.

== History ==
Fahrenholz lay in a valley and comprised several large farms. It was first mentioned in the records in 1226. For centuries the heath farmers lived off the land. Until the 19th century the keeping of moorland sheep, the Heidschnucke was the main source of income.

Over the course of time Fahrenholz was incorporated into the parish of Böstlingen along with the villages of Pröbsten and Deil. At the time of its resettlement 208 people lived in the parish.

== Cultural monuments ==
- Bronze Age tumuli
- New Stone Age dolmen shortly before Krelingen

== Sources ==
- Hinrich Baumann: Die Heidmark - Wandel einer Landschaft, Geschichte des Truppenübungsplatzes, Bergen 2006
- Hans Stuhlmacher: Die Heidmark, Schneeheide, 1939
