= Stork Farm Loburg =

German ornithological institute

Coordinates: 52.11747°N 12.08781°E

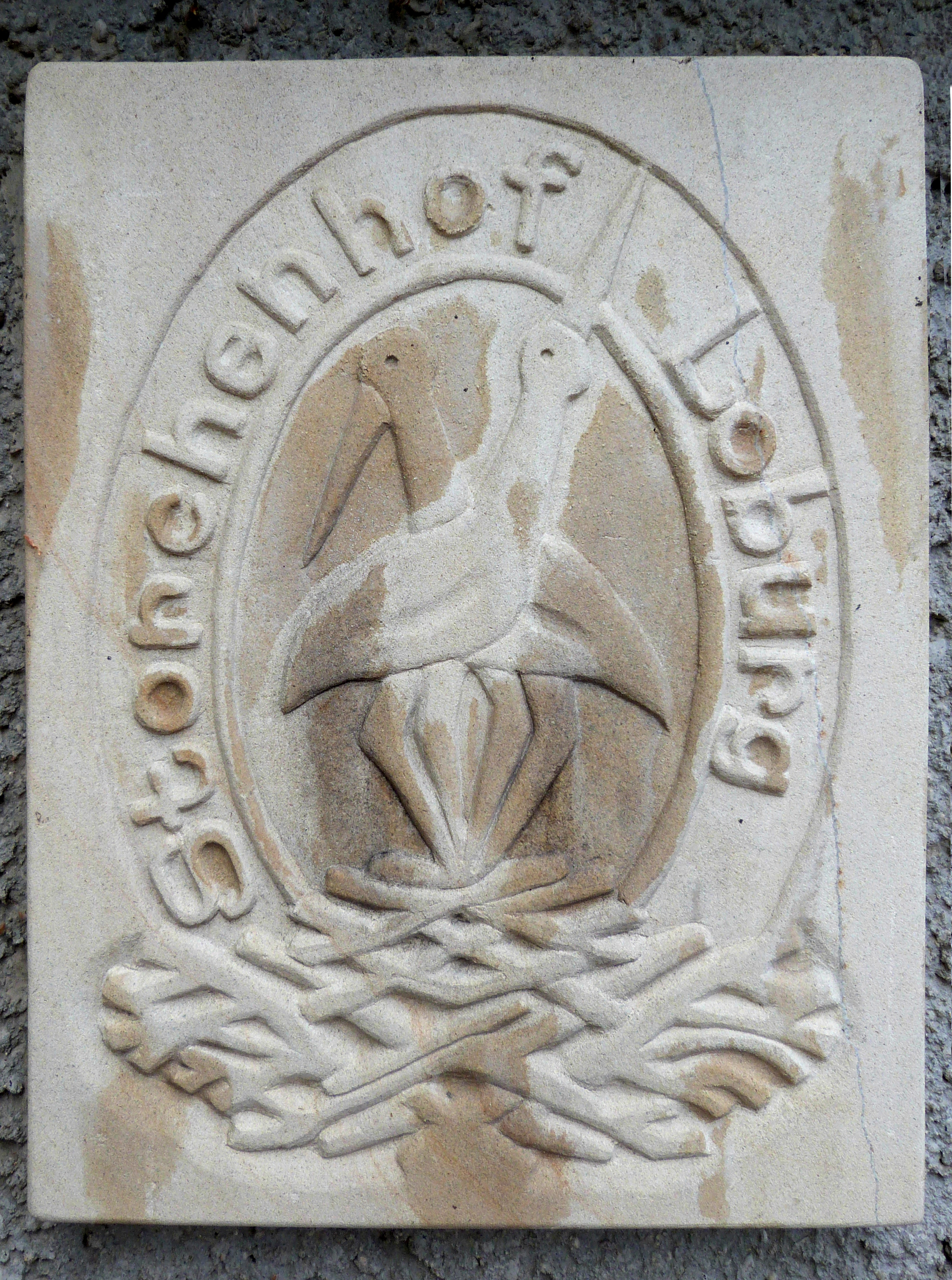
Insignia of the stork farm

The Stork Farm Loburg is a German ornithological institute located in Loburg, Jerichower Land.

== What they do ==
The main jobs of the facility, that is funded by an association in Saxony-Anhalt, are the breeding and reintroduction of young orphaned storks into the wild, as well as caring for injured storks. However, animals whose condition is too bad for reintroduction into the wild are permanently lodged at the stork farm.

Wild storks are tracked by satellite telemetry, which also captures their migration routes. The most famous example is the white stork Prinzesschen, who has since died.

Apart from storks, the farm also houses heritage breeds of different animals, such as the German sheep Heidschnucke and various types of chicken. The animals are looked after on an area of 3 ha and they often settle near the farm after being reintroduced into the wild.

== History ==
The Loburg ornithologist Christoph Kaatz dedicated his work to the counting and preservation of the stork population, the building of eyries and the banding of storks. He founded a team of specialists for the protection of white storks and publicly advocated in favour of nature and species conservation in his home region. In 1979, the Kaatz family set up a rescue centre for injured and orphaned storks on their property in Loburg.

In 1988, the stork farm was taken over by the culture department of the Magdeburg district in the then GDR. It was put under the control of the, at that time independent, city of Loburg. After the foundation of Saxony-Anhalt, the stork farm became an institution under the Saxony-Anhalt Ministry for Environment and Nature Protection and the location of the national ornithological institute. On January 1, 2006, the Stork Farm Loburg association, chaired by Christoph Kaatz, took on the responsibility for the ornithological institute.

The Stork Farm Loburg association is financed by donations and the sale of souvenirs as well as sponsorships of individual animals.

== Environmental Education Center ==
In 2016, the association acquired a former restaurant together with the accompanying residence. Aided by subsidies, the dining area was transformed into an environmental education center, in which there is a permanent exhibition on white storks. The renovation took seven years and it was reopened to the public in May 2023.

== Gallery ==
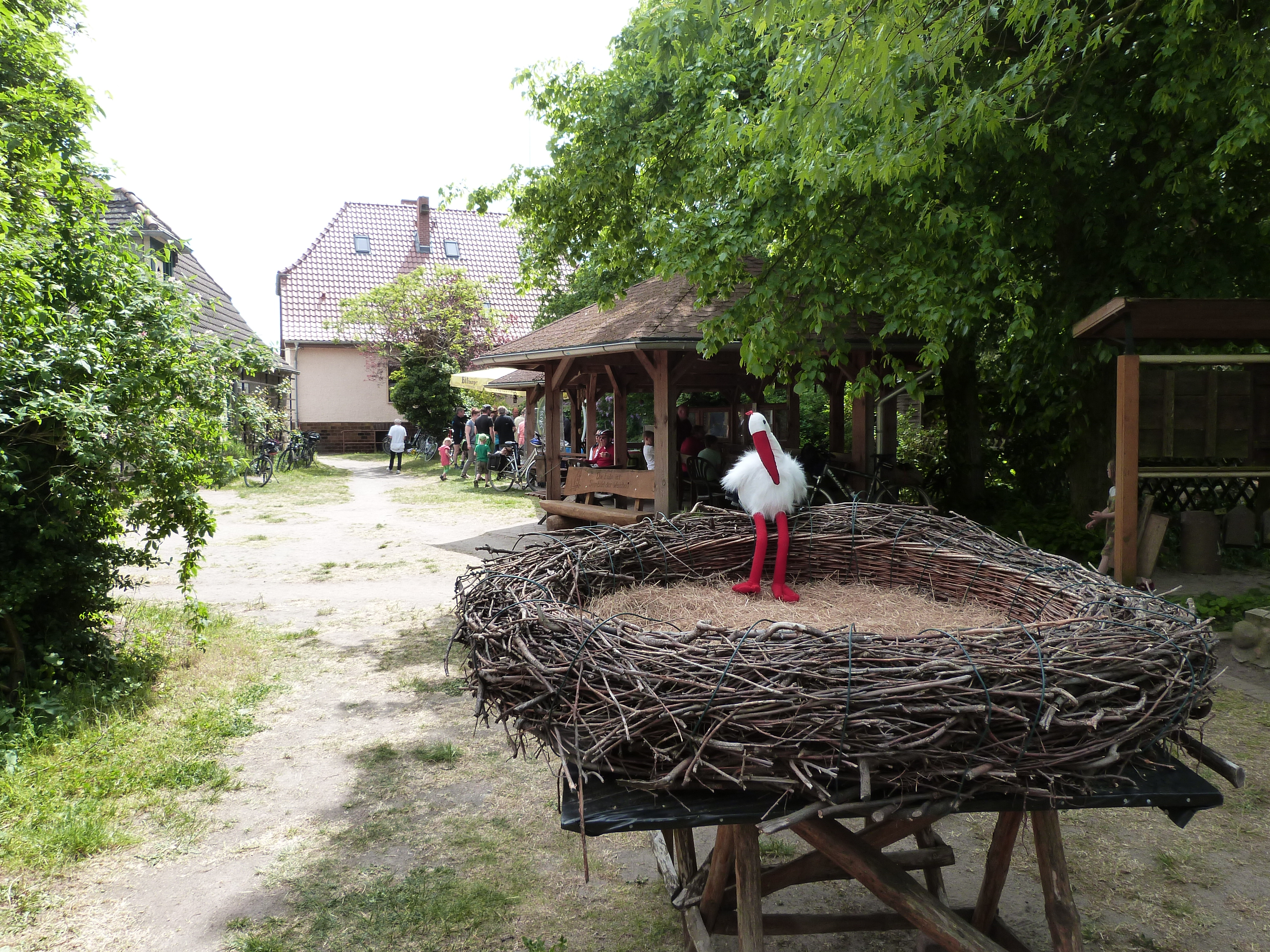
Visitor center with a reconstructed nest

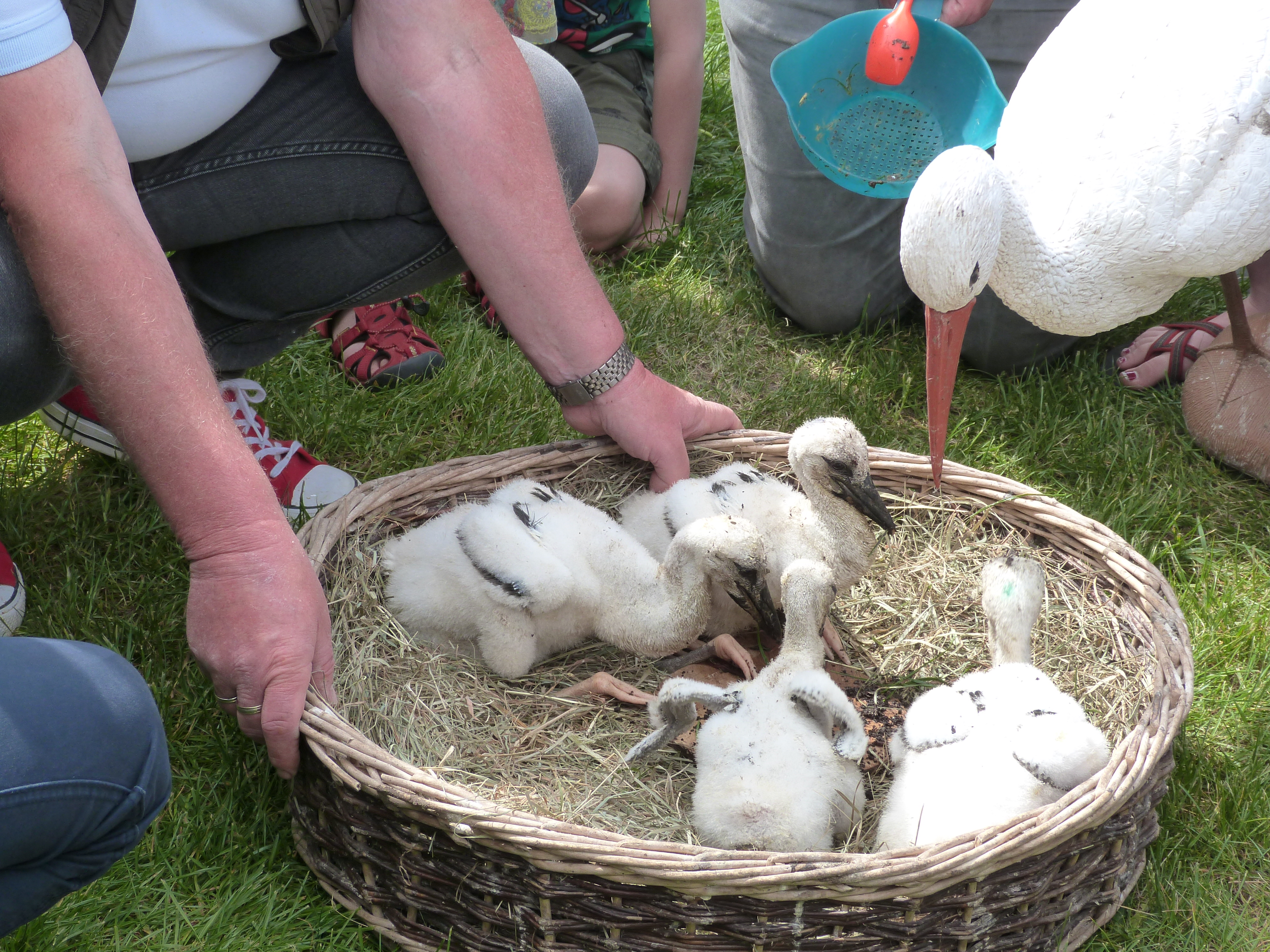
Looking after young orphaned storks

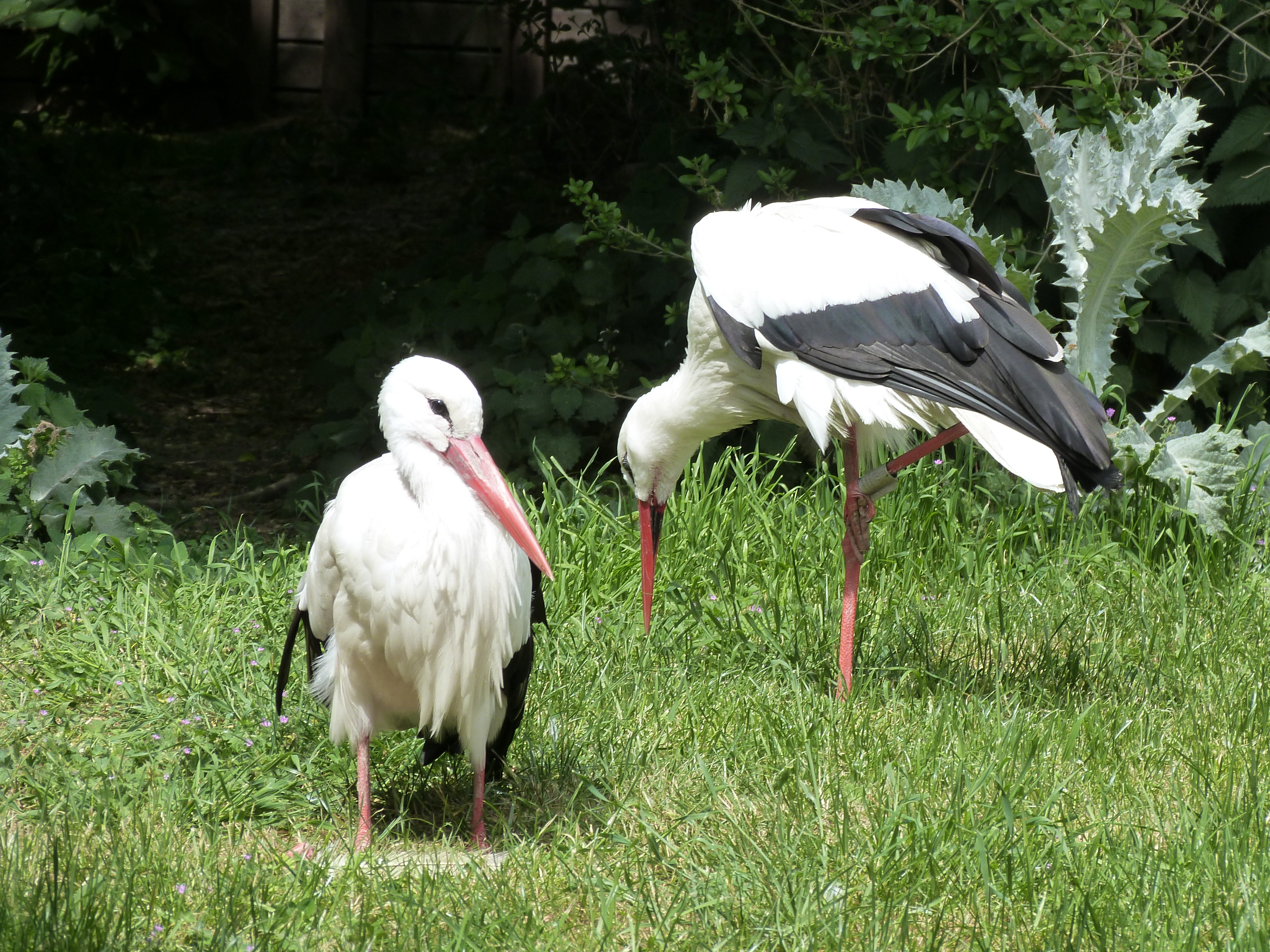
White storks in Loburg

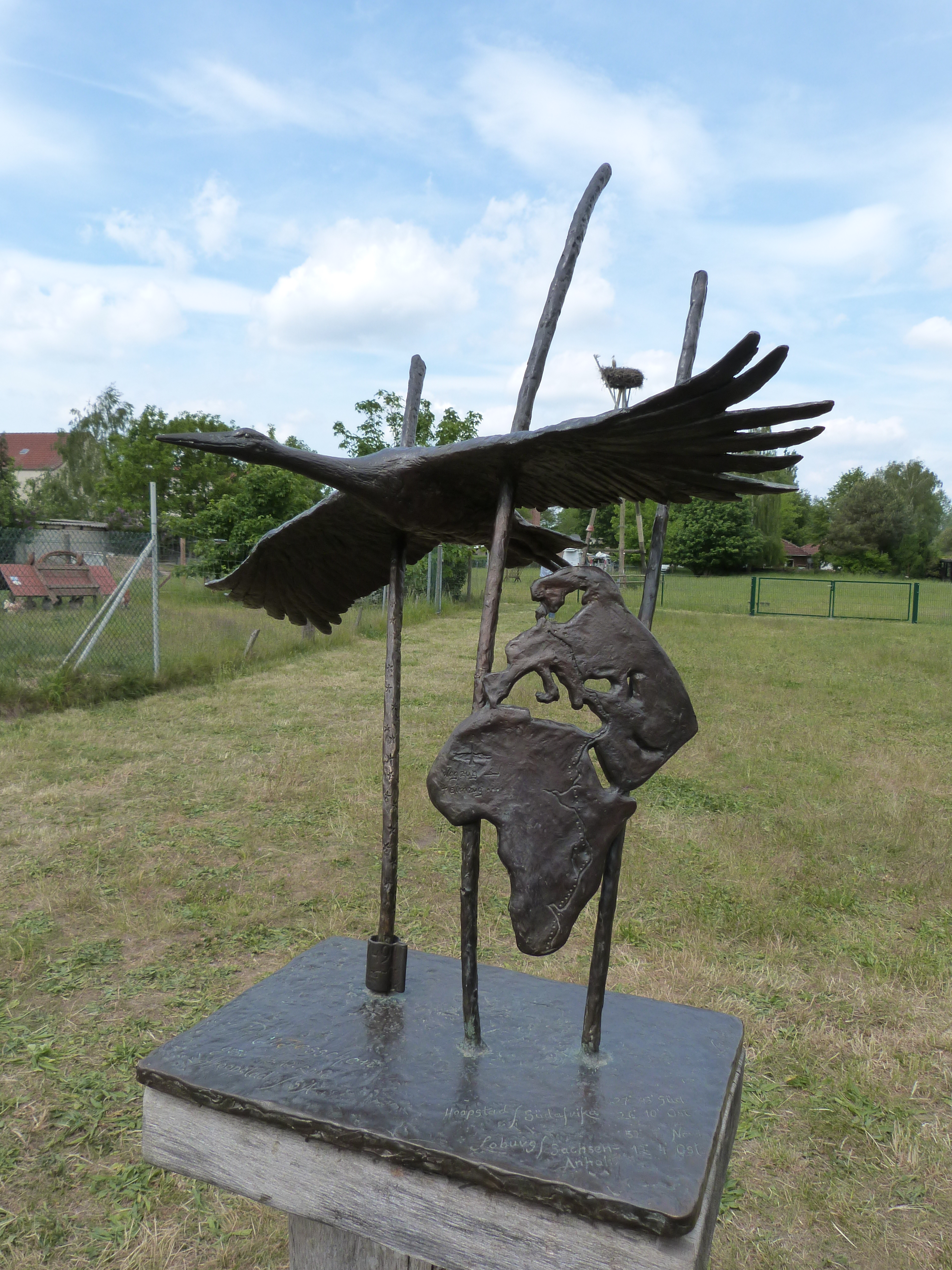
Memorial for Prinzesschen with her migration routes
