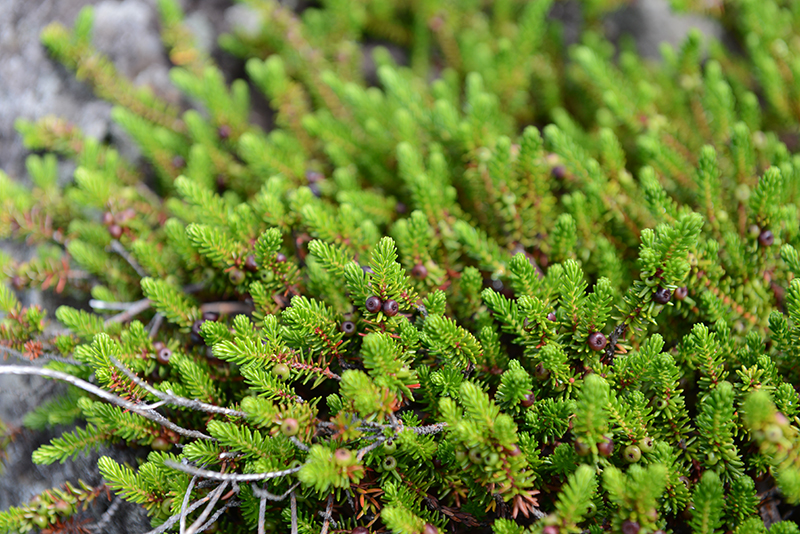

Scientific classification
- Kingdom: Plantae
- Clade: Tracheophytes
- Clade: Angiosperms
- Clade: Eudicots
- Clade: Asterids
- Order: Ericales
- Family: Ericaceae
- Genus: Empetrum
- Species: E. nigrum
- Subspecies: E. n. subsp. asiaticum

Trinomial name
- Empetrum nigrum subsp. asiaticum (Nakai ex H.Ito) Kuvaev

Synonyms
- Empetrum asiaticum (Nakai ex H.Ito) Nakai ex V.Vassil.; Empetrum kurilense V.N.Vassil.; Empetrum nigrum f. albicarphum Honda; Empetrum nigrum var. album J.Y.Ma & Yue Zhang; Empetrum nigrum var. asiaticum Nakai ex H.Ito; Empetrum nigrum var. asiaticum Nakai; Empetrum nigrum var. japonicum Siebold & Zucc. ex K.Koch; Empetrum nigrum f. japonicum R.D.Good; Empetrum nigrum subsp. japonicum Hultén; Empetrum sibiricum var. japonicum (Siebold & Zucc. ex K.Koch) Tzvelev

= Empetrum nigrum subsp. asiaticum =

Subspecies of flowering plant

Empetrum nigrum subsp. asiaticum, the Korean crowberry, is a subspecies of the flowering plant species Empetrum nigrum in the heather family, Ericaceae. The plant is called siromi (시로미) in Korean and gankōran (岩高蘭) in Japanese.
