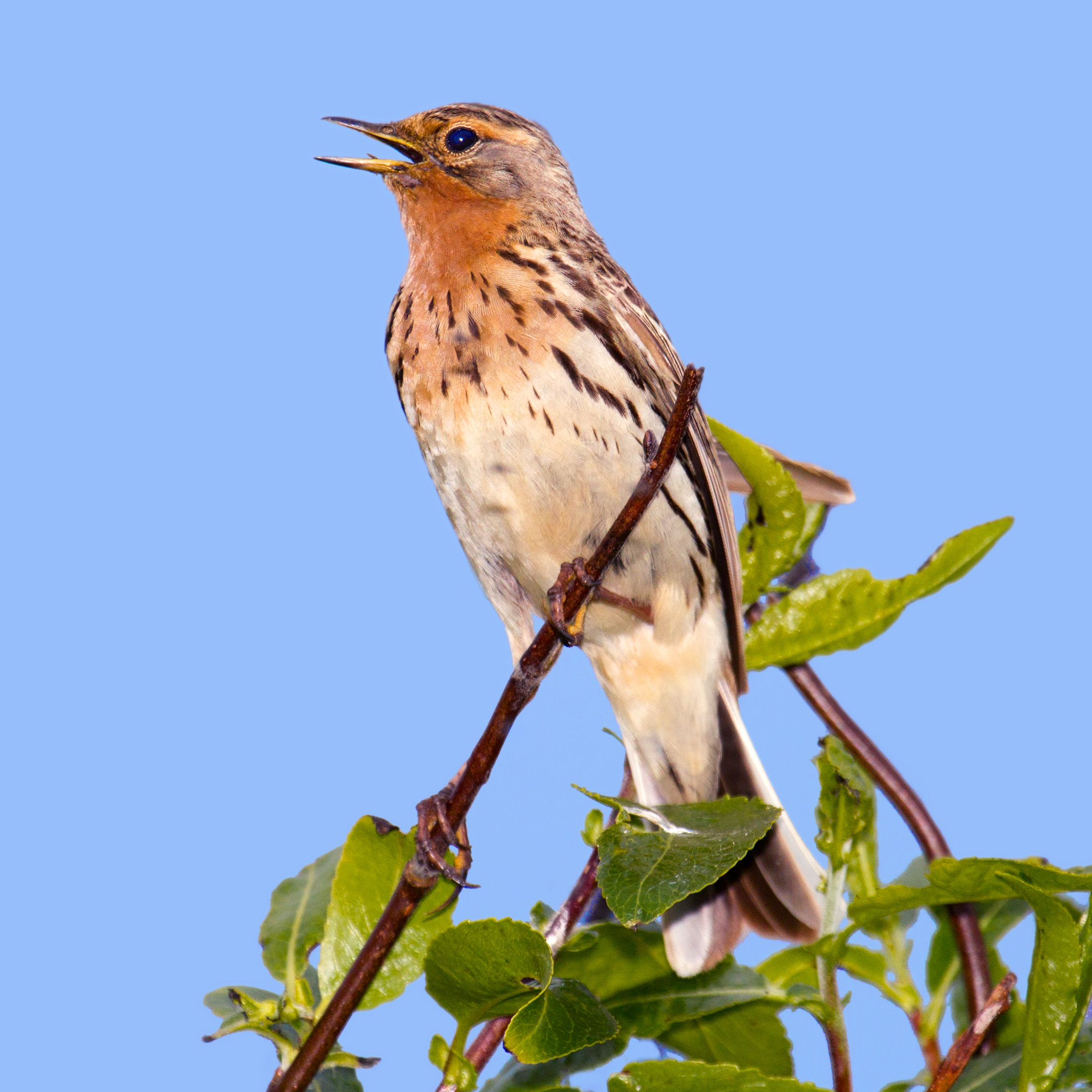

Conservation status
- Least Concern (IUCN 3.1)

Scientific classification
- Kingdom: Animalia
- Phylum: Chordata
- Class: Aves
- Order: Passeriformes
- Family: Motacillidae
- Genus: Anthus
- Species: A. cervinus

Binomial name
- Anthus cervinus (Pallas, 1811)
- Range of A. cervinus Breeding Passage Non-breeding

= Red-throated pipit =

Species of bird

The red-throated pipit (Anthus cervinus) is a small passerine bird, which breeds in the far north of Europe and the Palearctic, with a foothold in northern Alaska. It is a long-distance migrant, wintering to Africa and South-East Asia and western Alaska in North America. It is vagrant to Western Europe.

== Etymology ==
The scientific name is from Latin. The generic name Anthus is the name for a small bird of grasslands, and the specific name cervinus means "stag-coloured", from cervus, "stag".

== Description ==
This is a small pipit, with an adult easily identified in the breeding season by its brick-red face and throat. In other plumages, this is an undistinguished-looking species, heavily streaked brown above, with whitish mantle stripes, and with black markings on a white background below. It is very similar in appearance to the meadow pipit, and in the autumn, it much resembles the tree pipit, but has an altogether more striped appearance because of the larger numbers of streaks on the cap, back, flank, rump, and chest. The flight of the red-throated pipit is strong and direct, and it gives a characteristic psii call as it flies.

== Behaviour ==
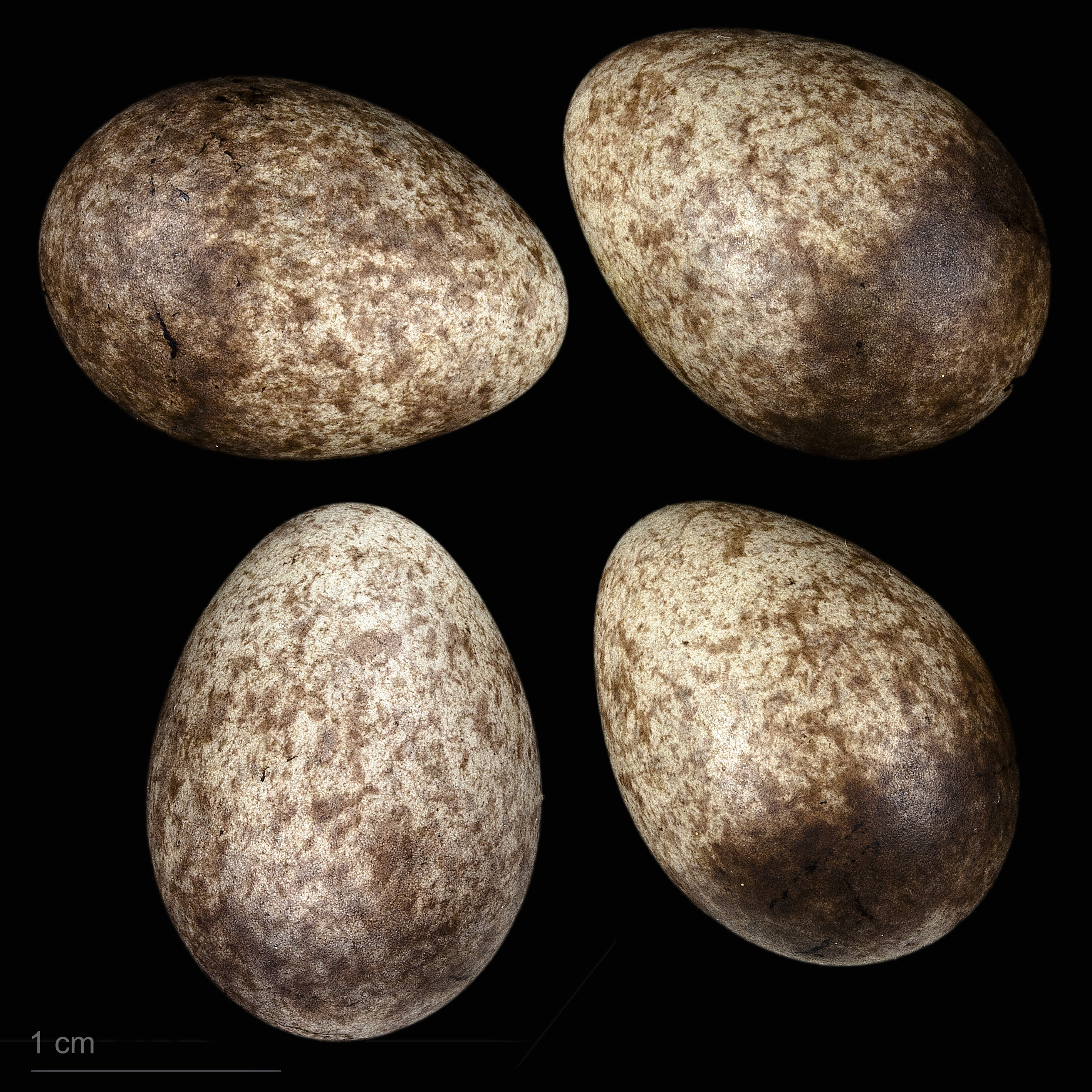
Anthus cervinus - MHNT

The red-throated pipit is native to the boreal regions of Northern Europe and Asia. The breeding habitat is open country including mountains, marshland, and tundra. The nest is built on the ground, often beside a tussock of grass, on rough grassland, or on a hummock in a marsh. It is made of dry grasses and sedges with a soft lining of reindeer hair or down. Four to six eggs are laid and incubated by the female for nearly two weeks. The young are fledged and ready to leave the nest about 12 days later. The red-throated pipit is insectivorous, like its relatives, but also eats seeds.

== Status ==
The red-throated pipit has a very large range and the global population has been estimated to be about two million individuals. It is rated as being of least concern by the IUCN, as its population is believed to be stable, and it faces no particular threats.

== Gallery ==
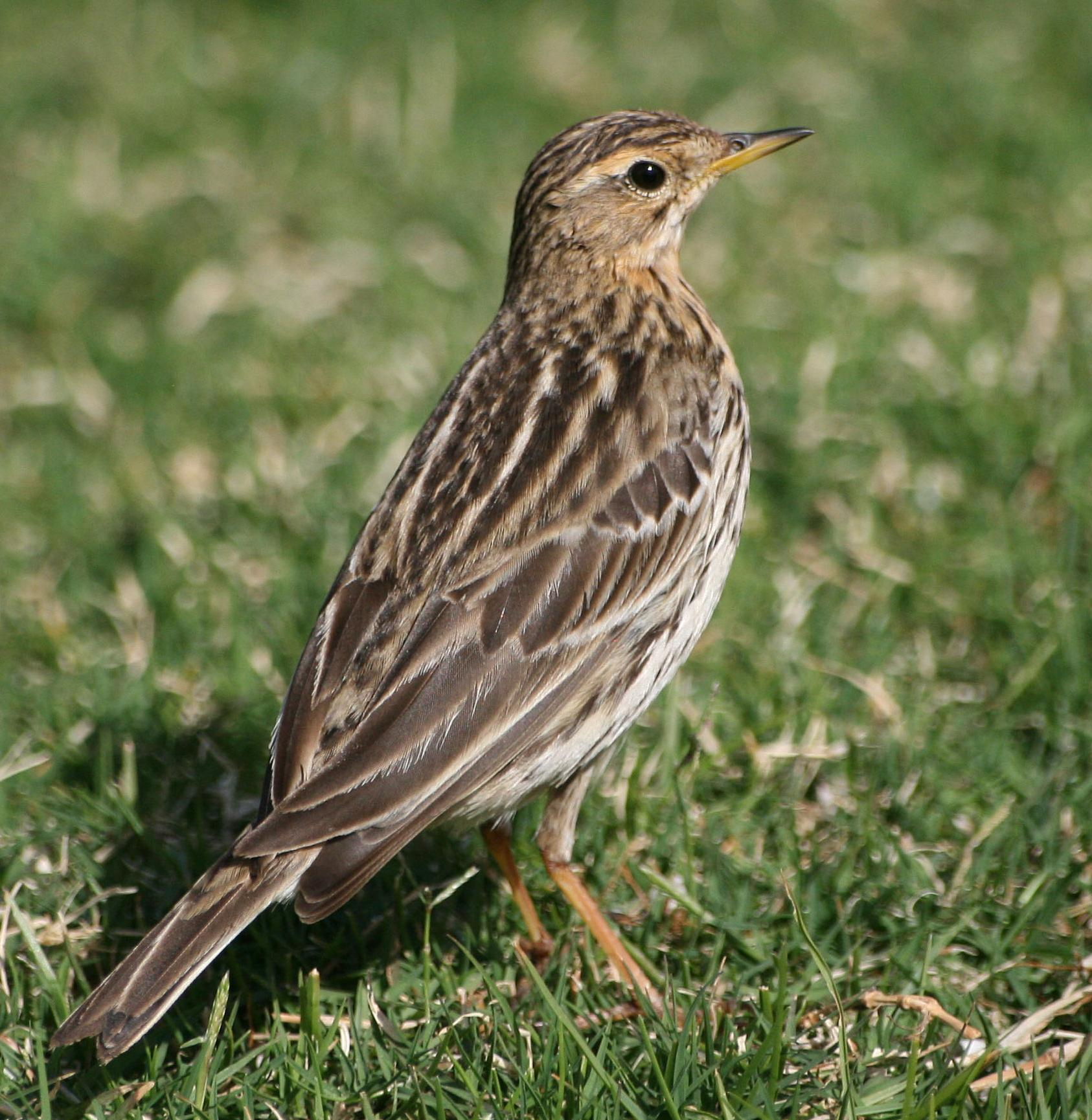
Red-throated pipit

Thumamah, KSA 1992
