= Bockhorn (Walsrode) =

Coordinates: 52°49′41″N 9°40′18″E

Bockhorn is a parish in the borough of Walsrode in the Heidekreis district in the Lüneburg Heath in the north German state of Lower Saxony. About 290 people live in this heath parish which has an area of 9.0 km^{2}.

== History ==
Bockhorn was first mentioned officially in 1237. The name "Bockhorn" is derived from the location of the village. The syllable boke means beech, the syllable horn means corner or height. On Bockhorn's farms there are still old beech and oak trees today which characterise the appearance of the village.

Since the administrative reform of 1974 the hitherto independent parish of Bockhorn has been one of 23 divisions in the borough of Walsrode.

== Geography ==
=== Location ===
Bockhorn lies in the southeastern part of the borough of Walsrode, 7 km southeast of the town itself and 2.5 km east of Düshorn. To the east it borders on a large military training area.

=== Neighbouring parishes ===
Its neighbouring parishes are - clockwise from the north – Bad Fallingbostel, Fahrenholz, Krelingen and Düshorn.

== Politics ==
The parish chairman is Heinrich Wischmann

== Infrastructure ==
=== Transport ===
==== Roads ====
The B 7 motorway runs east of Bockhorn about 1 km away, and the 3-way Walsrode motorway interchange lies 4 km to the south. The B 209 federal road from Bad Fallingbostel via Walsrode and Rethem to Nienburg runs past to the north, 3.5 km away.

In Bockhorn there are no road names, purely house numbers, to which inhabitants, postmen, delivery men and visitors have to orient themselves.

== Places of interest ==
=== FloraFarm ===
The unique ginseng gardens of the FloraFarm on the edge of the village, covering an area of over 9 ha, are the only place in Europe, where the Korean ginseng has been grown and sold commercially for almost 30 years.
