= Empetrum atropurpureum =

Purple crowberry

Conservation status
- Secure (NatureServe)

Scientific classification
- Kingdom: Plantae
- Clade: Tracheophytes
- Clade: Angiosperms
- Clade: Eudicots
- Clade: Asterids
- Order: Ericales
- Family: Ericaceae
- Genus: Empetrum
- Species: E. atropurpureum

Binomial name
- Empetrum atropurpureum Fernald & Wiegand

Synonyms
- Empetrum eamesii subsp. atropurpureum (Fernald & Wiegand) D.Löve

Species of flowering plant

Empetrum atropurpureum, common name purple crowberry, is a North American species of dwarf evergreen shrub.

== Description ==
The species forms a low-lying shrub with prostrate stems, forming a mat on the ground. Leaves are alternate or in whorls. Flowers are solitary near the tips of branches, each with 3 white petals. Fruits are spherical, purple to reddish-purple.

== Taxonomy ==
Empetrum atropurpureum was formerly a subspecies of E. eamesii, with all the United States and some of the Canadian material belonging to subsp. atropurpureum (Fernald & Wiegand) D.Löve. Some authorities recognise the promotion to full species, but not others.

== Distribution and habitat ==
It is native to eastern Canada and the northeastern US. It has been reported from sand dunes, rocky outcrops, and alpine heath in Québec, Nova Scotia, Prince Edward Island, Maine, New Hampshire, Vermont, New York (Essex County), Michigan, Minnesota, Newfoundland and Labrador and Saint Pierre and Miquelon.
