= Empetrum eamesii =

Rock crowberry

Conservation status
- Apparently Secure (NatureServe)

Scientific classification
- Kingdom: Plantae
- Clade: Tracheophytes
- Clade: Angiosperms
- Clade: Eudicots
- Clade: Asterids
- Order: Ericales
- Family: Ericaceae
- Genus: Empetrum
- Species: E. eamesii

Binomial name
- Empetrum eamesii Fernald & Wiegand

Synonyms
- Empetrum nigrum var. eamesii (Fernald & Wiegand) B. Boivin; Empetrum rubrum subsp. eamesii (Fernald & Wiegand) R.D. Good; Empetrum rubrum var. eamesii (Fernald & Wiegand) Cronquist

Species of flowering plant

Empetrum eamesii, common name rock crowberry, is a Canadian species of dwarf evergreen shrub.

== Description ==
The species forms a low-lying shrub with prostrate stems, forming a mat on the ground. Leaves are alternate or in whorls. Flowers are solitary near the tips of branches, each with 3 white petals. Fruits are spherical, pink or red.

== Taxonomy ==
All the United States and some of the Canadian material belongs to Empetrum atropurpureum, which is now regarded as a separate species by some authorities but not others.

== Distribution and habitat ==
It is native to eastern Canada. It has been reported from sand dunes, rocky outcrops, and alpine heath in Québec, Newfoundland and Labrador and Nova Scotia.
