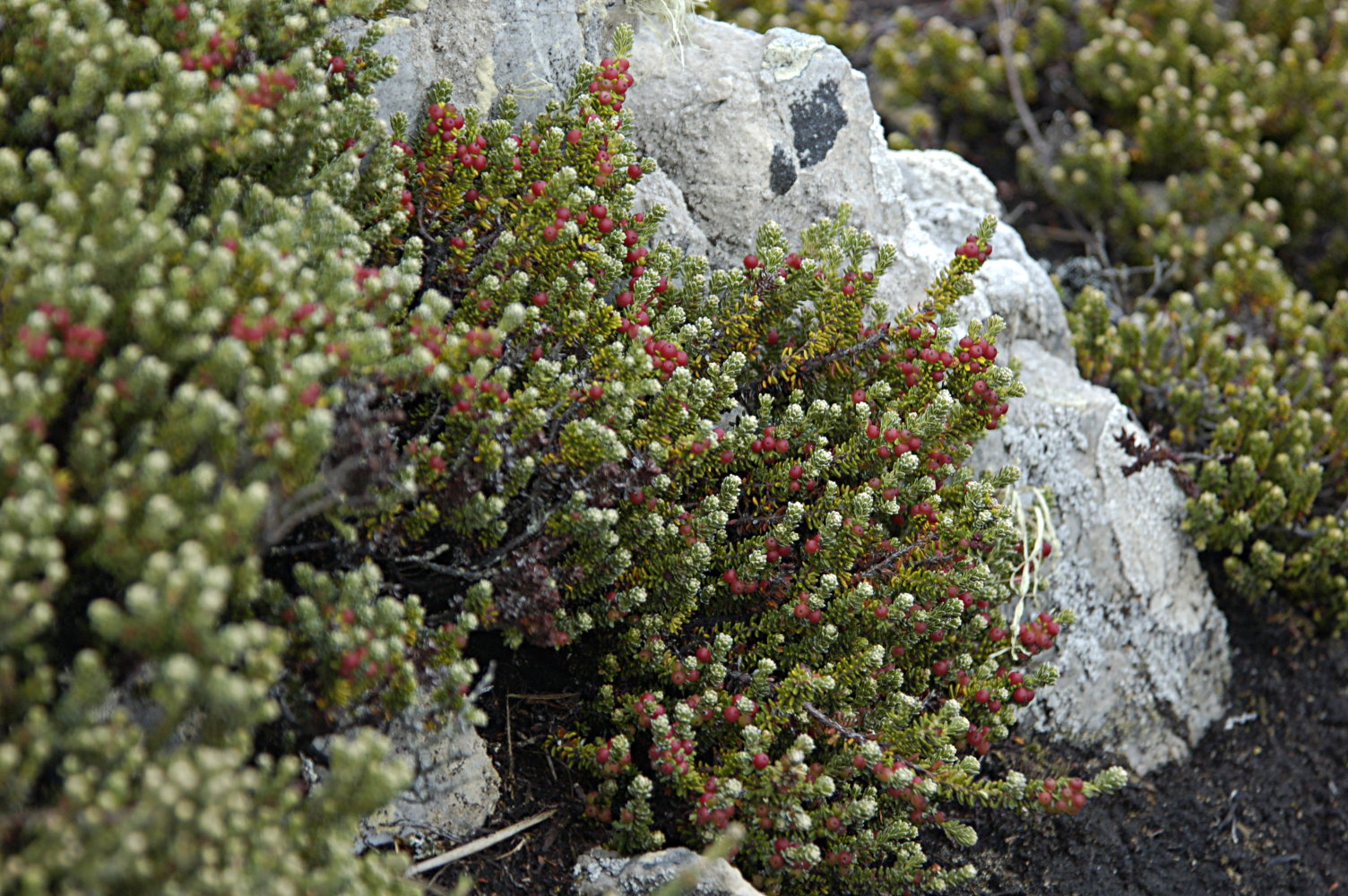
- Red crowberry growing in the Falkland Islands

Scientific classification
- Kingdom: Plantae
- Clade: Tracheophytes
- Clade: Angiosperms
- Clade: Eudicots
- Clade: Asterids
- Order: Ericales
- Family: Ericaceae
- Genus: Empetrum
- Species: E. rubrum

Binomial name
- Empetrum rubrum Vahl ex Willd.

Forms; Subspecies; Varieties
- E. r. f. falklandicum R.D.Good; E. r. subsp. eamesii (Fernald & Wiegand) R.D.Good; E. r. var. atropurpureum (Fernald & Wiegand) R.D.Good; E. r. var. eamesii (Fernald & Wiegand) Cronquist

= Empetrum rubrum =

Red crowberry

Species of flowering plant

Empetrum rubrum, known as red crowberry or diddle-dee (Chilean Spanish: Murtilla de Magallanes), is a species of plant in the heath family, Ericaceae.

== Distribution and habitat ==
The species is distributed in Chile from Talca (35°S) to Cape Horn (55°S), in areas of adjacent Argentina, in the Falkland Islands, and in Tristan da Cunha. One of its northernmost natural growing places is Laguna del Maule.

In Chile, it often grows in high-altitude areas close to the tree line and can tolerate alpine conditions such as strong winds and high sun exposure. In the Falkland Islands, it is the dominant species across large areas of lowland and upland dwarf shrub heath.

== Uses ==
Its fruits are edible.

== In culture ==
It is referenced in the Falkland Islands' unofficial national anthem.

== Gallery ==
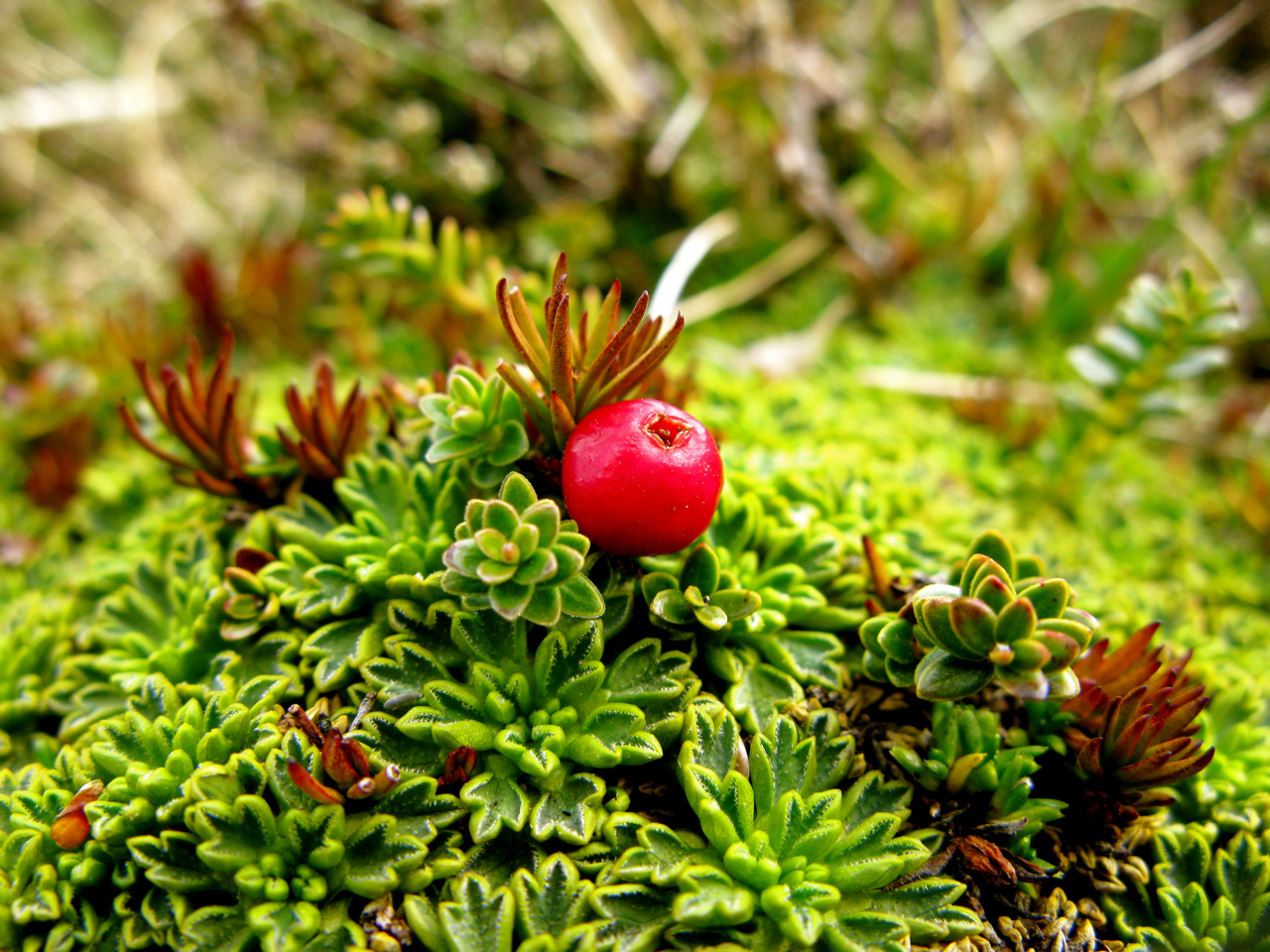
Close up of Empetrum rubrum in Navarino Island, Tierra del Fuego.

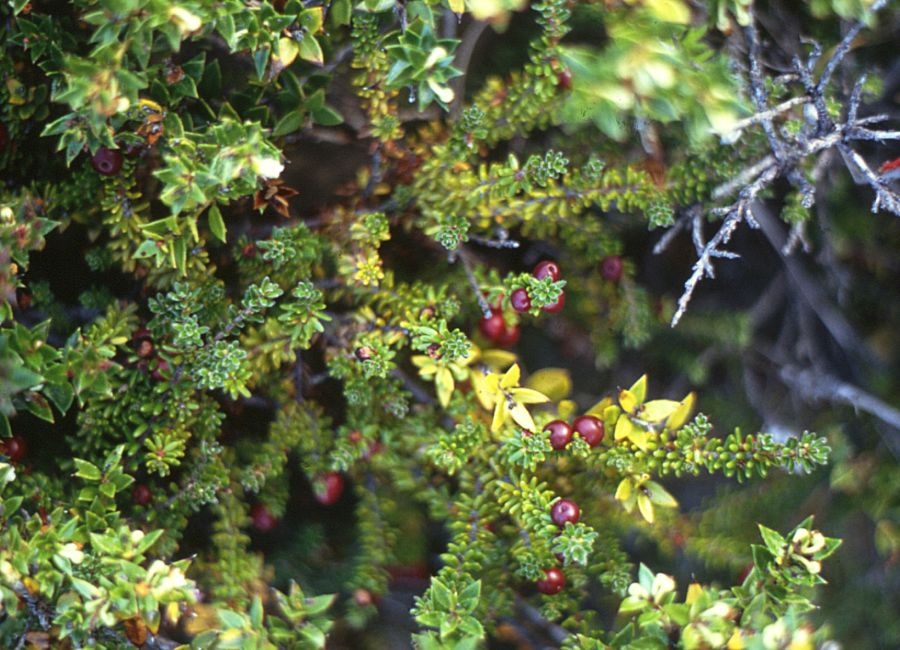
Empetrum rubrum from Torres del Paine National Park
