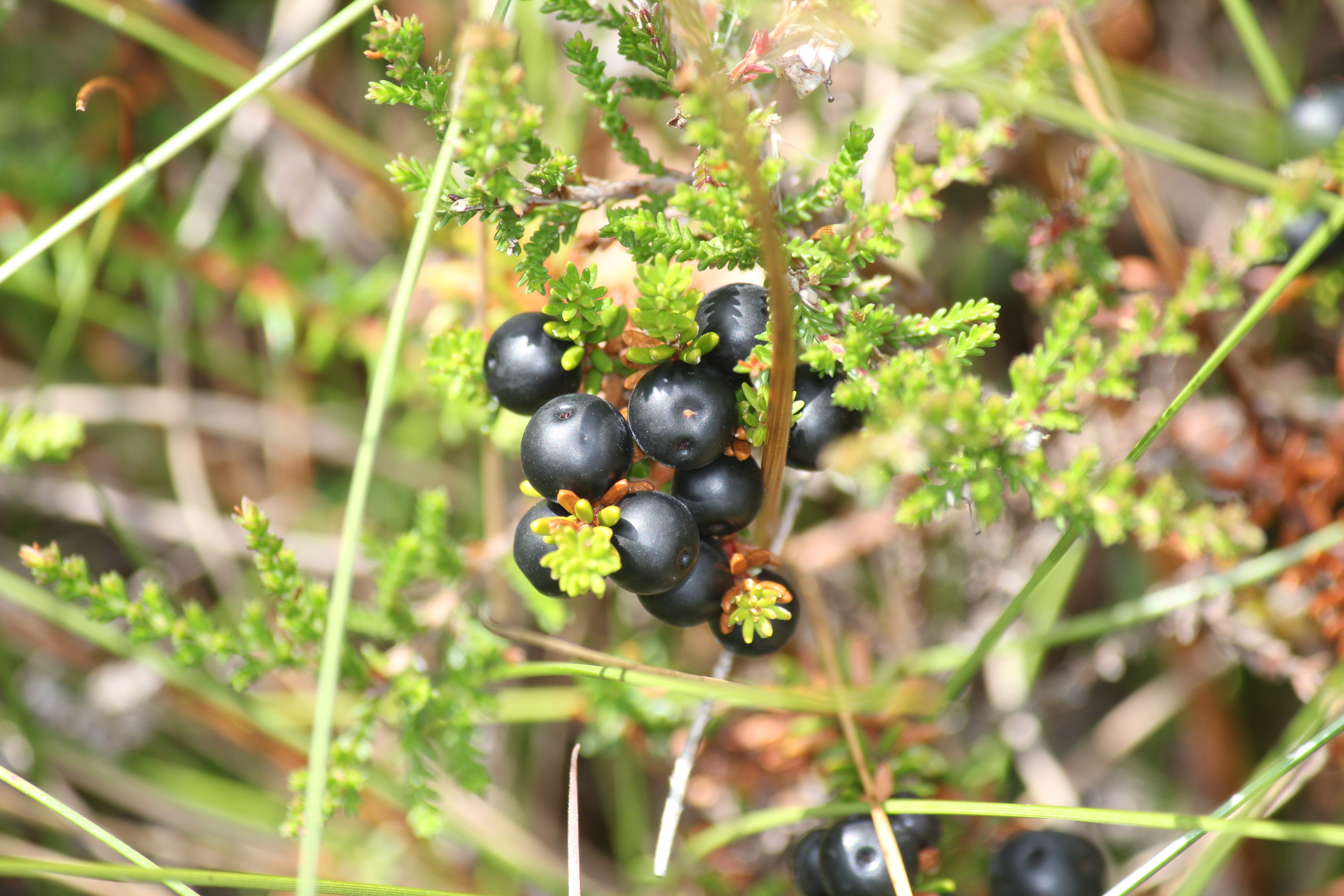

Scientific classification
- Kingdom: Plantae
- Clade: Tracheophytes
- Clade: Angiosperms
- Clade: Eudicots
- Clade: Asterids
- Order: Ericales
- Family: Ericaceae
- Genus: Empetrum
- Species: E. nigrum

Binomial name
- Empetrum nigrum L.

Synonyms
- Chamaetaxus nigra (L.) Bubani; Empetrum arcticum V.N.Vassil.; Empetrum crassifolium Raf.; Empetrum eamesii subsp. hermaphroditum (Hagerup) D.Löve; Empetrum hermaphroditum Hagerup; Empetrum hermaphroditum var. americanum V.N.Vassil.; Empetrum medium Carmich.; Empetrum nigrum f. cylindricum Lepage; Empetrum nigrum var. hermaphroditum (Hagerup) T.Sørensen; Empetrum nigrum subsp. hermaphroditum (Hagerup) Böcher; Empetrum nigrum f. purpureum (Raf.) Fernald; Empetrum nigrum var. purpureum (Raf.) A.DC.; Empetrum purpureum Raf.

= Empetrum nigrum =

Black crowberry

Species of plant in the heather family

Empetrum nigrum, the crowberry, black crowberry, mossberry, rockberry, or, in western Alaska, Labrador, etc., blackberry, is a flowering plant species in the heather family Ericaceae with a near circumboreal distribution in the Northern Hemisphere. North American Indigenous names for this species include asiavik (Iñupiaq), dineechʼúh (Gwichʼin), paurngaq (Inuktut), xéelʼi (Tlingít), xa skáawaa (Haida), and ts'nełt'ida (Dena’ina).

== Etymology ==
The scientific name of the plant comes from the combination of the Greek for 'upon a rock' (en = upon + petros = rock) and the Latin for 'black' (niger).

== Description ==
Empetrum nigrum is a low growing, evergreen shrub with a creeping habit. The leaves are 3–6 millimetres (1/8–1/4 inch) long, arranged alternately along the stem. The stems are red when young and then fade to brown; they grow slowly, around 7 – 15 cm (3 – 6 inches) per year. This plant can form thick, clonal mats than prevent other plants from overgrowing it.

Empetrum nigrum is usually dioecious, though a few individuals are bisexual and have perfect flowers. Because this species is highly clonal, an entire patch may be of a single sex. Empetrum nigrum flower buds start to develop the summer before they open, blooming the following year between May and June. The flowers are small (3 – 6 mm), have little or no scent and are not very noticeable, Flowers consist of 3 greenish-pink sepals that turn reddish purple, 3 petals, 3 stamens (males) or a pistil with an ovary that contains 6 – 9 ovules (females).

The round fruits are berries, 4–6 mm (1/8–1/4 in) wide, usually black or purplish-black but occasionally red and contain an average of 7.8 seeds per fruit. The fruits are well-protected against pathogens and as a result can persist throughout the winter. Fruits average 86.5% water, and their dry weight includes 14.4% carbohydrates and 12.2% lipids, which is possibly the highest lipid content of any fleshy fruit in Europe.

== Subspecies ==
- Empetrum nigrum subsp. asiaticum (Nakai ex H.Ito) Kuvaev – Korean crowberry
- Empetrum nigrum subsp. subholarcticum (V.N.Vassil.) Kuvaev (synonym: Empetrum subholarcticum V.N.Vassil.)

== Distribution and habitat ==
The species has a near circumboreal distribution in the Northern Hemisphere.

Empetrum nigrum grows in bogs and other acidic soils in shady, moist areas; it also grows in subalpine and alpine habitats in the Pacific Northwest. It can grow in soils with a pH as low as 2.5, but it does not grow in basic soils (pH > 8).

== Ecology ==
Empetrum nigrum flowers are likely pollinated by a combination of generalist insects (e.g., flies, beetles) and wind. Animals that regularly consume this species and act as seed dispersers include rodents, foxes, bears, caribou and many bird species. Because it retains its fruit throughout the winter and into the spring, it is an important food for species such as red-backed voles at a time of year when few other foods are available.

The moth species Glacies coracina, Zygaena exulans, and Hadula melanopa feed on the plant.

The metabolism and photosynthetic parameters of Empetrum can be altered in winter-warming experiments.

Empetrum nigrum has allelopathic properties (e.g. hampering seed germination and root extension of other plants) but the strength of these are dependent on the soil type.

Empetrum nigrum roots host ericoid mycorrhizal species (ascomycetes and basidiomycetes), which increase access to nitrogen and phosphorus.

== Uses ==
The fruit is edible and can be dried, and may have an acidic taste. In the Alaskan tundra, it is known to have a sweet and slightly tart flavor. It is often mixed with other berries in dishes like pies and puddings.

It is abundant in Scandinavia and treasured for its ability to make liqueur, wine, juice, or jelly. In subarctic areas, the plant has been a vital addition to the diet of the Inuit and the Sami. It is used to make Alaskan ice cream. The Dena'ina (Tanaina) harvest it for food, sometimes storing in quantity for winter, sometimes mixed with lard or oil.

In the Canadian province of Newfoundland and Labrador, the berries (known locally as “blackberries”) are used in jams, jellies, and baked goods, such as buns, or puddings. In Labrador and northern regions of Newfoundland, entire plants are harvested and the sods used to impart flavour to smoked fish.

The species can also be grown as a ground cover, or as an ornamental plant in rock gardens, notably the yellow-foliaged cultivar 'Lucia'. The fruit is high in anthocyanin pigment and can be used to make a natural dye.

== In culture ==
The Scottish Highlands Clan Maclean's badge is believed to be E. nigrum.

== Gallery ==
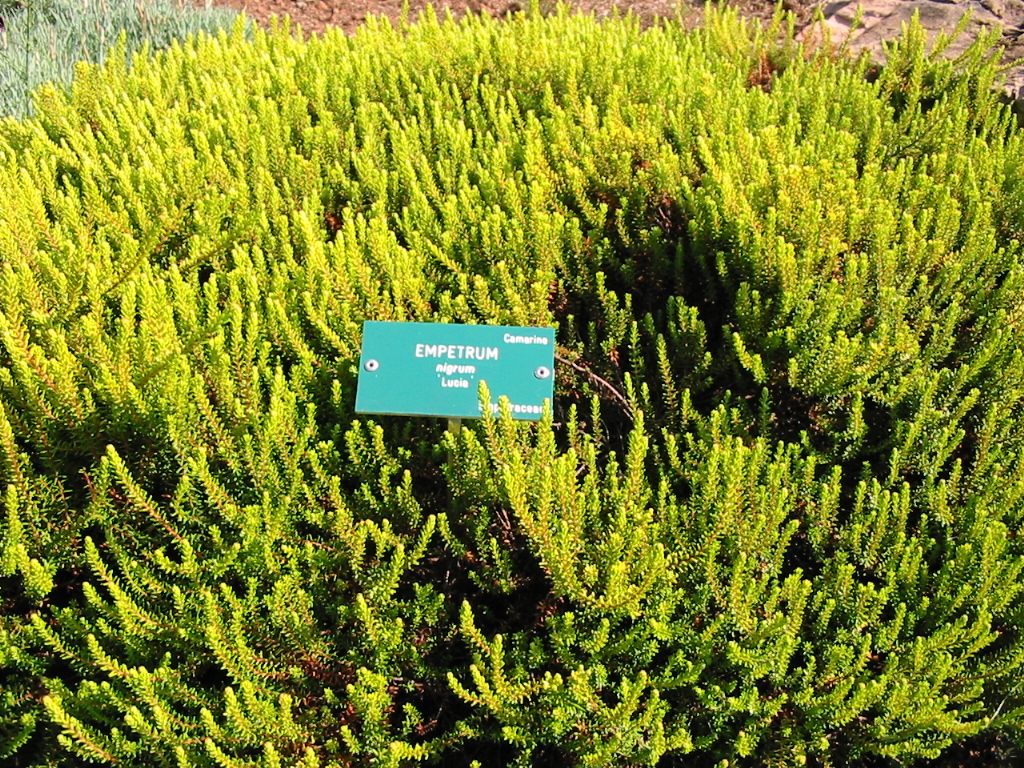
The yellow-leaved cultivar Empetrum nigrum 'Lucia'

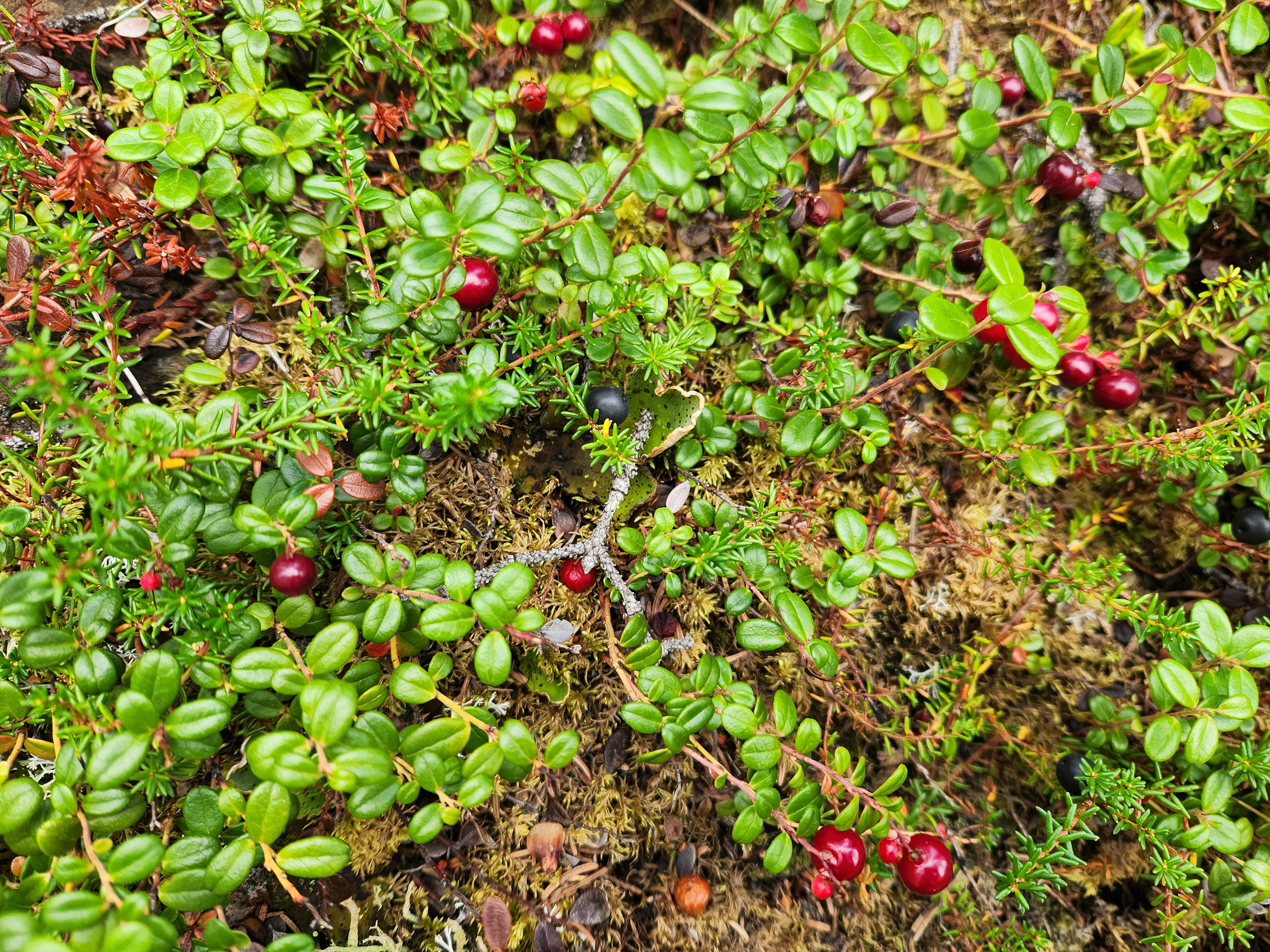
Vaccinium vitis-idaea and Empetrum nigrum in Denali

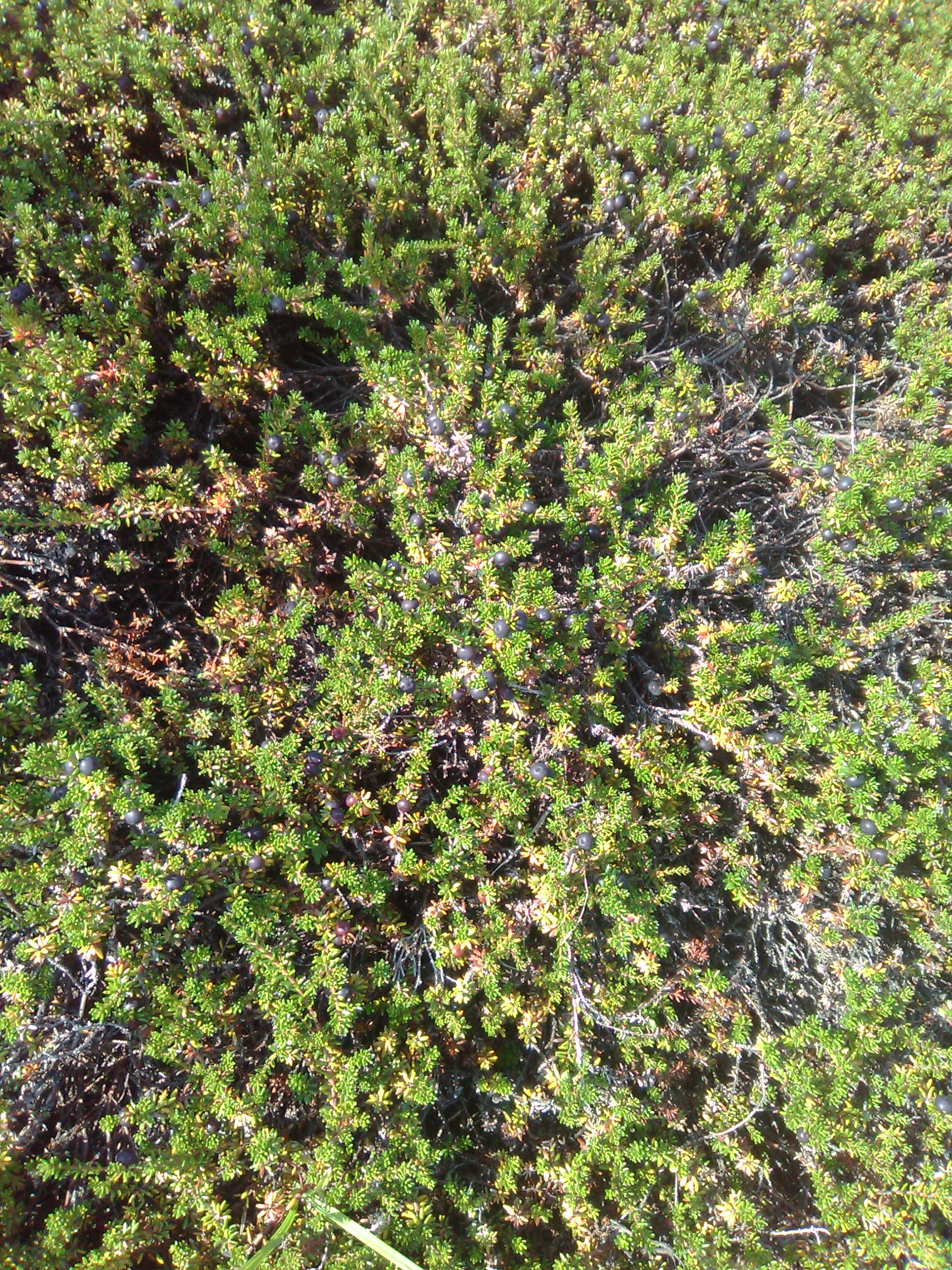
Alaskan crowberry

== Bibliography ==
- Ehrlén, Johan; Eriksson, Ove (1991). "Phenological variation in fruit characteristics in vertebrate-dispersed plants". Oecologia. 86 (4): 463–470. Bibcode:1991Oecol..86..463E. doi:10.1007/BF00318311. ISSN 0029-8549. PMID 28313326.
- Forest Service Fire Ecology
