= Deil (Heidmark) =

Coordinates: 52°50′24″N 9°41′21″E

Deil was a farm in the old district (Altkreis) of Fallingbostel, located in the Heidmark region in the north German state of Lower Saxony. In 1935/1936, the farm was commandeered by the barracks built in the vicinity and served as an officers mess. There were probably several farms in a village called Deil in former times. Deil Farm (Hof Deil) belonged to the parish of Bockhorn and was its largest farmstead. The last owner sold wood, but could not avoid going bankrupt.

== History ==
Heath farmers lived in Deil. Their main source of income until the 19th century was the keeping of moorland sheep known locally as Heidschnucken.

== Sources ==
- Hinrich Baumann: Die Heidmark - Wandel einer Landschaft. Geschichte des Truppenübungsplatzes Bergen. 2006
- Hans Stuhlmacher: Die Heidmark. Schneeheide 1939
