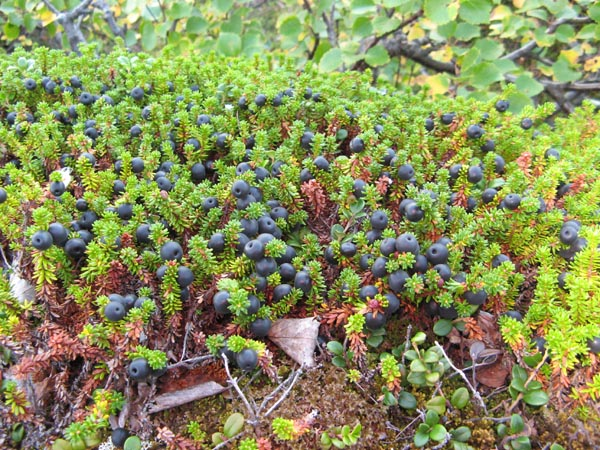
- Empetrum nigrum

Scientific classification
- Kingdom: Plantae
- Clade: Tracheophytes
- Clade: Angiosperms
- Clade: Eudicots
- Clade: Asterids
- Order: Ericales
- Family: Ericaceae
- Tribe: Empetreae
- Genus: Empetrum; L.

Species
- Empetrum atropurpureum Empetrum eamesii Empetrum nigrum Empetrum rubrum

= Empetrum =

Genus of flowering plants in the heath family

Empetrum is a genus of three species of dwarf evergreen shrubs in the heath family, Ericaceae. They are commonly known as crowberries and bear edible fruit. Species of Empetrum include: E. nigrum (crowberry) and its tetraploid form, sometimes given its own name hermaphroditum, E. eamesii and E. rubrum.

== Description ==
All three species are evergreen mat forming shrubs, with small, light green needle-like leaves 3–10 millimetres (1/8–3/8 in) long. The flowers are small and either bisexual or dioecious. The fruit is a fairly dry berry. The plant has slender, wiry, spreading branches covered with short, narrow, stiff leaves, the margins of which are recurved so as to form a hollow cylinder concealing the hairy under face of the leaf, which protects against excessive loss of water from the leaf.

== Taxonomy ==
The genus and related ones such as Ceratiola and Corema were for most of the 20th century classified in their own family Empetraceae, but molecular data, leaf morphology, and other considerations point to their inclusion in the Ericaceae (specifically, as a tribe within the subfamily Ericoideae). This tribe does share a number of distinctive morphological features, which seem to be associated with wind pollination.

Species of Empetrum include: E. nigrum (crowberry or black crowberry) and its tetraploid subspecies E. nigrum ssp. hermaphroditum, E. eamesii and E. rubrum.

== Distribution and habitat ==
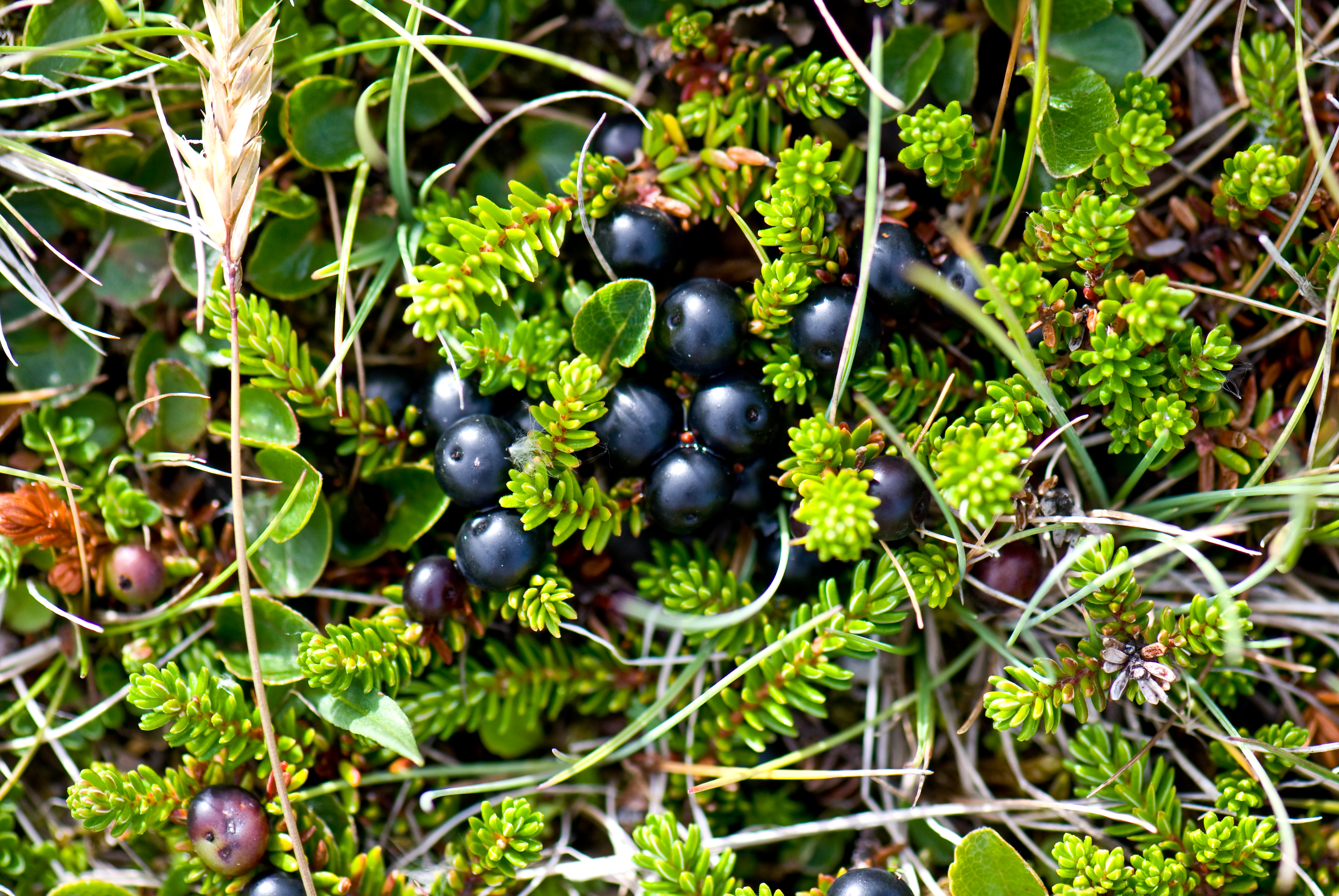
E. nigrum berries in Iceland

They are commonly found in the Northern Hemisphere, from temperate to subarctic climates, and also in the Southern Andes of South America and on the South Atlantic islands of South Georgia, the Falklands and Tristan da Cunha. The typical habitat is on moorlands, tundra, muskeg and spruce forests. They are also often found in areas of coastal exposure on the sand dunes and dune slacks.

Evolutionary biologists have explained the striking geographic distribution of crowberries as a result of long-distance migratory birds dispersing seeds from one pole to the other.

== Uses ==
The vitamin content of crowberries is low, as is also the concentration of volatile liquids, the lack of which makes them almost odorless. The acidity is lower than is typically encountered in forest berries.

In subarctic areas, Empetrum has been a vital addition to the diet of the Inuit and the Sami. After waning popularity, the crowberry is regaining its reputation as an edible berry. It provides a steady crop and the gathering is relatively easy. The high concentration of anthocyanin pigment can be used as a natural food dye. The Dena'ina (Tanaina) harvest it for food, sometimes storing in quantity for winter, and like it mixed with lard or oil. They keep well in a cool place without any special preparation.

The berries are usually collected in the fall of the year but if not picked they may persist on the plant and can be picked in the spring. The Inuit and Native Americans mix them with other berries, especially the blueberry. Cooking enhances the flavor. They make good pie and jelly.

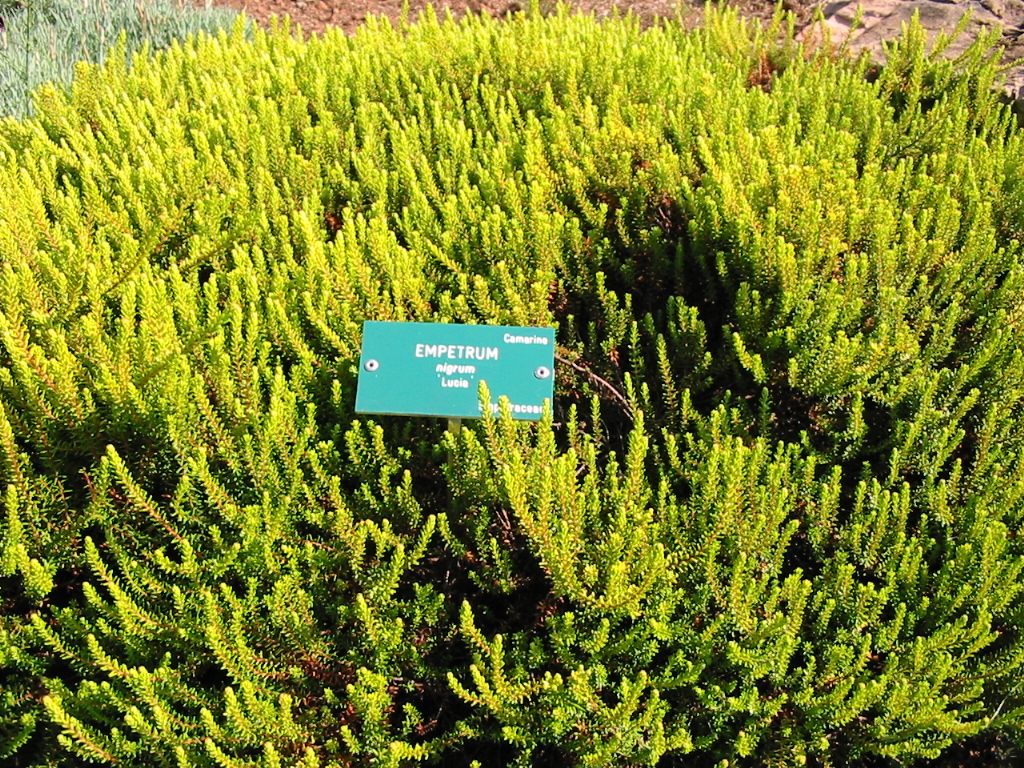
The yellow-leaved cultivar Empetrum nigrum 'Lucia'

The leaves and stems are used in Dena'ina medicine for diarrhea and stomach problems; they are boiled or soaked in hot water, and the strained liquid drunk.

In Dena'ina plantlore in the Outer and Upper Inlet area of Lake Clark, the root is also used as a medicine, being used to remove a growth on an eye and to heal sore eyes. The roots are boiled and the eyes are washed with the strained, cooled tea, to which a little sugar may be added.

Crowberries are also occasionally grown as ornamental plants in rockeries, notably the yellow-foliage cultivar Empetrum nigrum 'Lucia'.

== See also ==
- List of fruits
