= Heidschnucke =

Breed of sheep

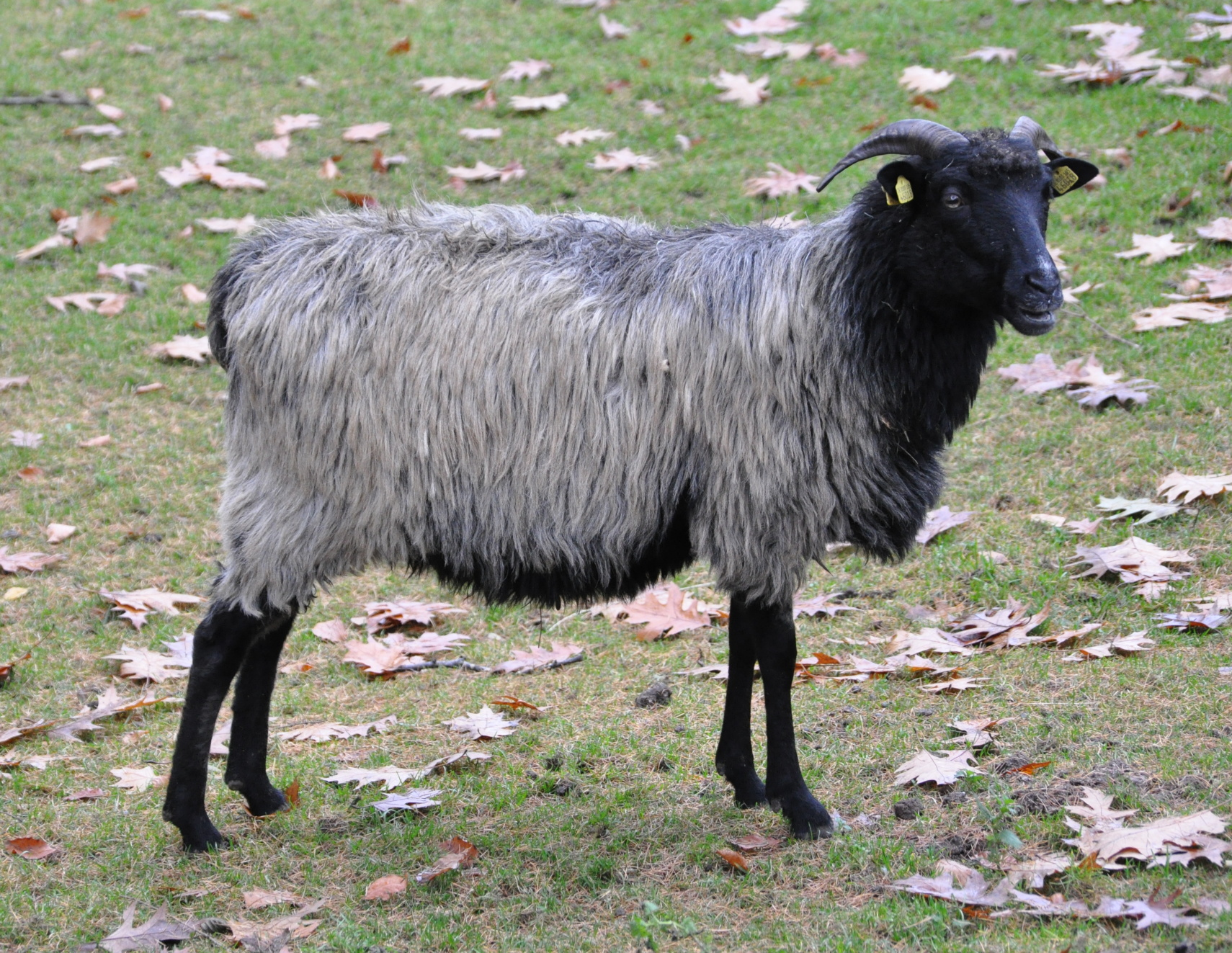
Heidschnucke in the Lüneburg Heath wildlife park, Germany

The Heidschnucke is a group of three types of moorland sheep from northern Germany. Like a number of other types from Scandinavia and Great Britain, they are Northern European short-tailed sheep. The three breeds of Heidschnucke (in order of population size) are:

- German Grey Heath (Graue Gehörnte Heidschnucke)
- White Polled Heath (Weiße Hornlose Heidschnucke or Moorschnucke)
- White Horned Heath (Weiße Gehörnte Heidschnucke)

The main breeding areas are the north German heathland and moors of the Lüneburg Heath. That said, this sheep, which is easy to look after, may nowadays be found in all parts of Europe, mainly because of its meat which has a gamey flavour. Some breeds are classed as domestic species threatened with extinction so their preservation is subsidised within the European Union.

The hair of the German Grey Heath is greyish and very long. Its legs, tail and head are black, the lambs are born black and take on adult markings in their second year. There are also white variants. Both sexes have horns.

The meat of the Lüneburger Heidschnucke g. U. (a German Grey Heath) is protected within Europe under this name and may carry the seal to show that it is a Protected Designation of Origin (geschützte Ursprungsbezeichnung). On the other hand, its long, straggly wool is only suitable for coarsely woven fabrics such as carpets. The Diepholz Moorschnucke (a white polled moorland sheep) is also a protected local breed.

In former times there were north German flocks of moorland sheep that were both grey and white, horned and polled. By selective breeding during the 20th century the breeds seen today were created and their weight virtually doubled.

"Moorland Sheep Day" (Heidschnuckentag) takes place every year on the second Thursday in July at Müden. Here the young rams that have proved themselves are presented to breeders and onlookers. The best animals are awarded prizes. Heidschnucke rams can be bought at the closing auction.

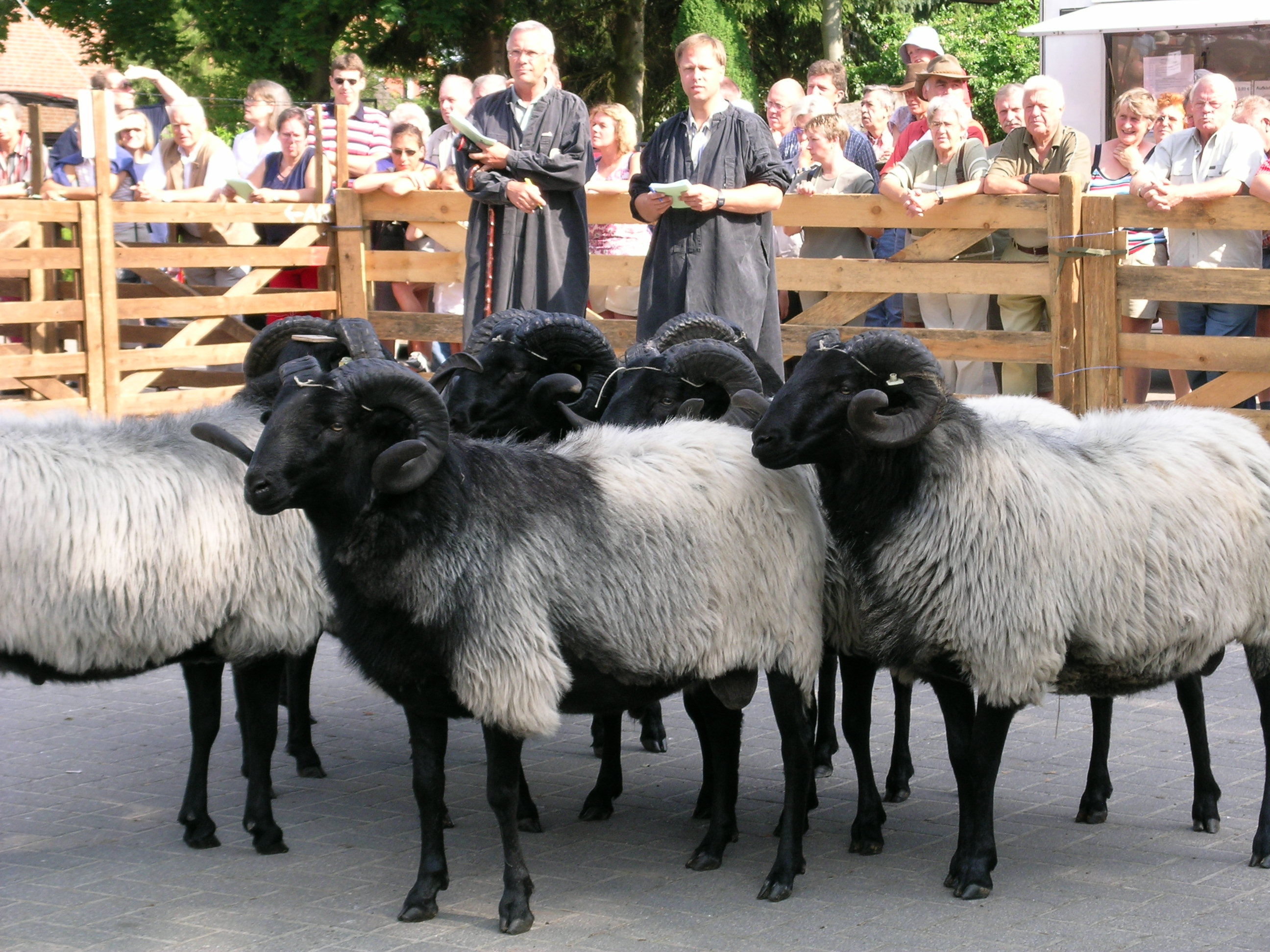
Inspection of rams.

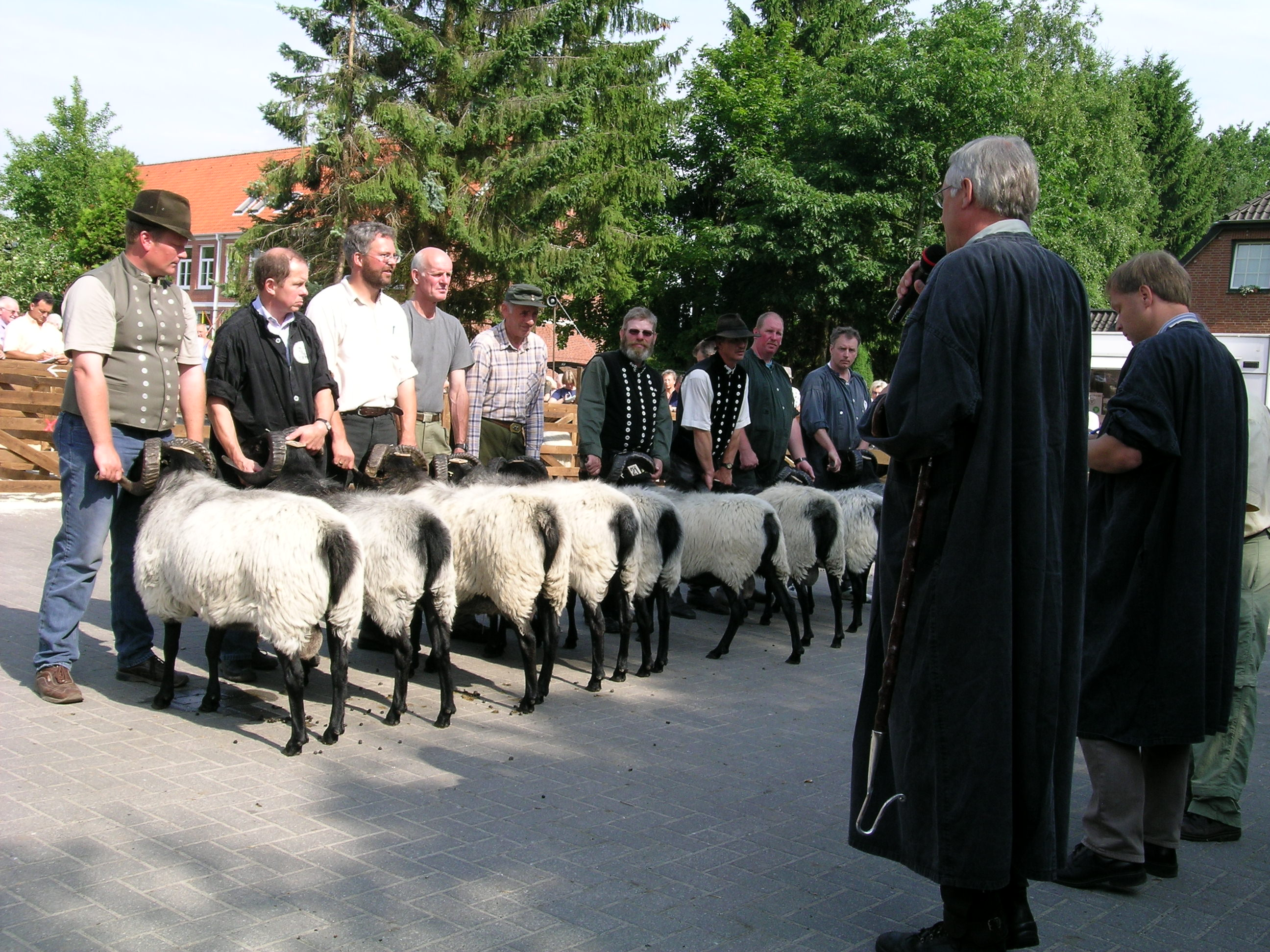
Young rams are awarded prizes.

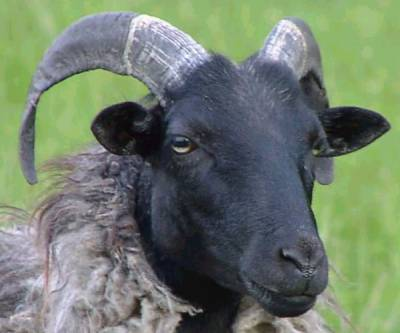
Heidschnucke ewe.

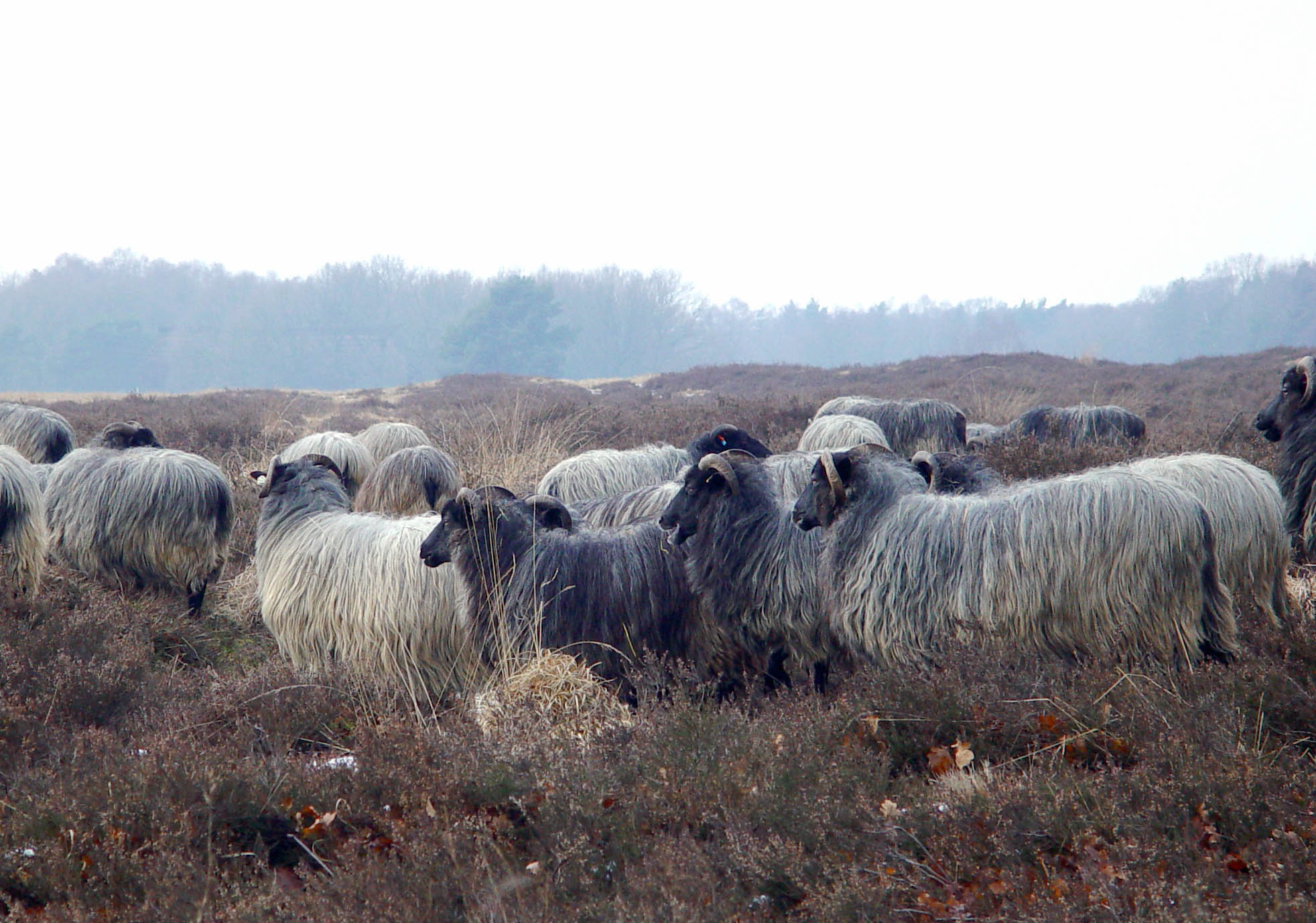
Flock on heath near Schneverdingen.

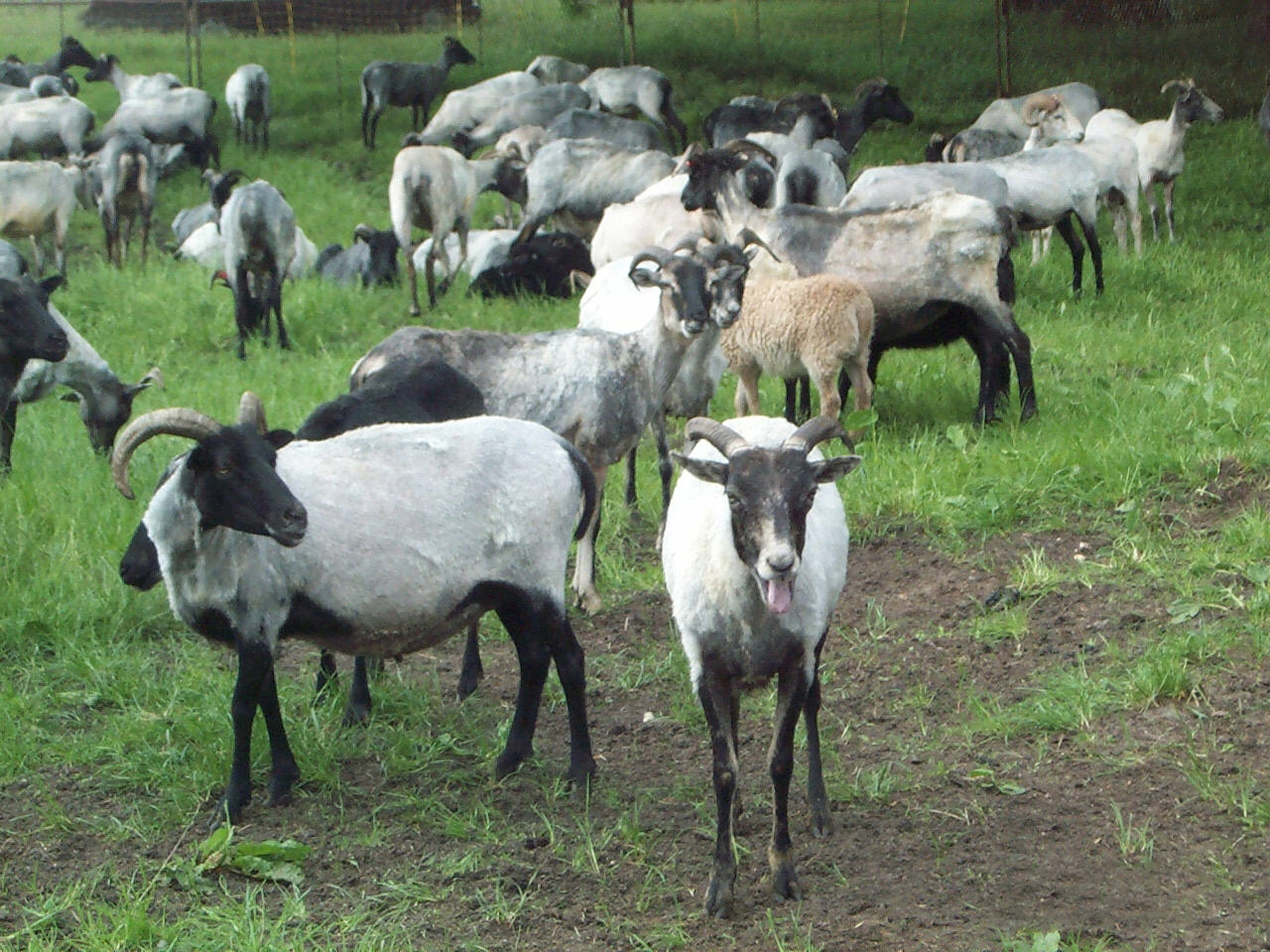
Shorn Heidschnucke flock on the Lüneburg Heath.

== See also ==
- White Polled Heath
- List of sheep breeds
