= Winsen an der Aller =

Winsen
- Municipality
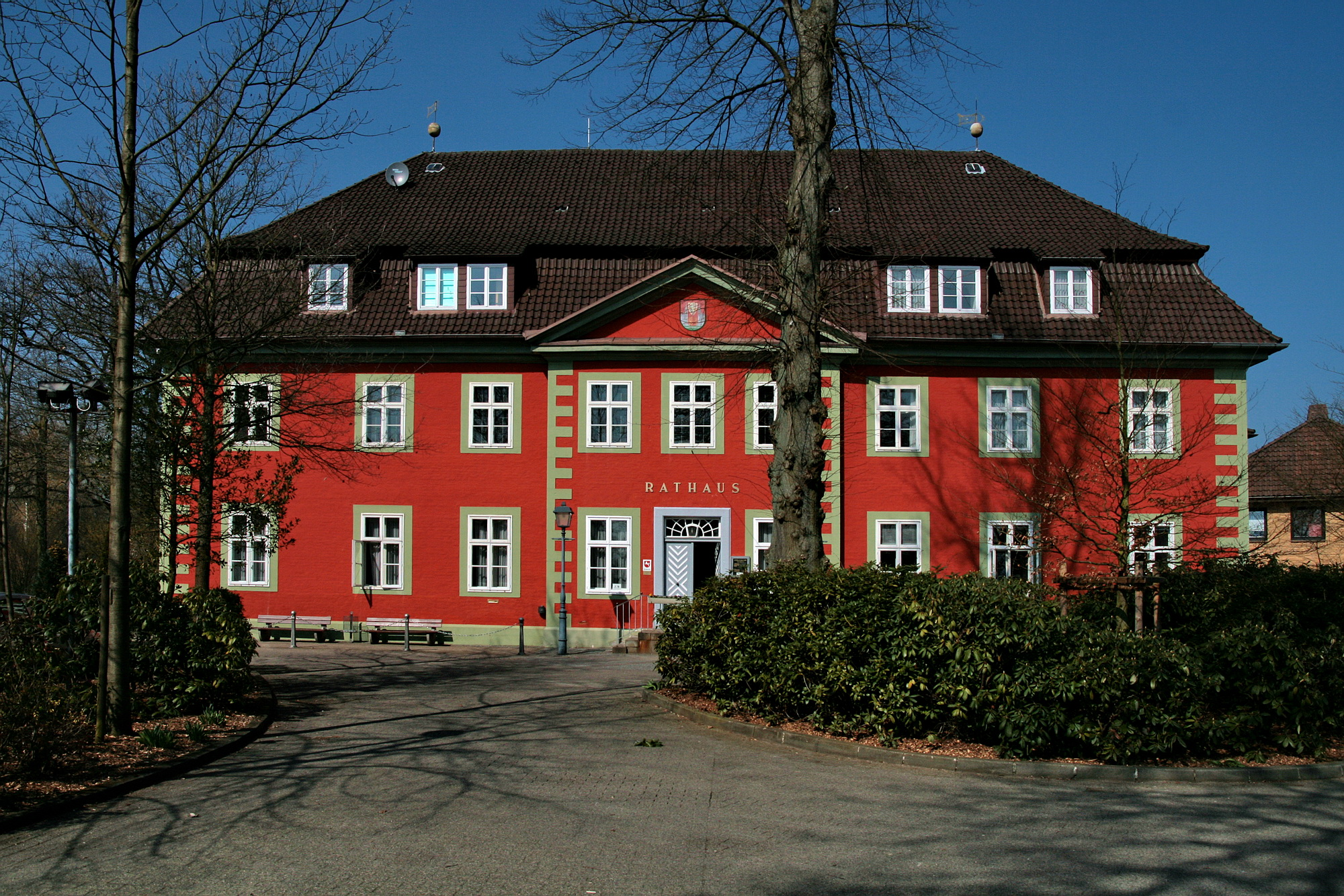
- Town hall

- Coat of arms

- Location of Winsen within Celle district
- Interactive map of Winsen
- Location within Germany Location within Lower Saxony
- Coordinates: 52°40′48″N 9°54′34″E
- Country: Germany
- State: Lower Saxony
- District: Celle

Government
  - Mayor (2018–23): Dirk Oelmann (SPD)

Area
  - Total: 155.85 km^{2} (60.17 sq mi)
- Elevation: 33 m (108 ft)

Population (2025-12-31)
  - Total: 12,720
  - Density: 81.62/km^{2} (211.4/sq mi)
- Time zone: UTC+01:00 (CET)
  - Summer (DST): UTC+02:00 (CEST)
- Postal codes: 29308
- Dialling codes: 05143
- Vehicle registration: CE
- Website: www.winsen-aller.de

Winsen an der Aller (German pronunciation: [ˈvɪnzn̩ ʔan deːɐ̯ ˈʔalɐ]) or Winsen (Aller) is a town in the district of Celle in the German state of Lower Saxony.

== Geography ==
Winsen has around 12,900 inhabitants and lies on the southern perimeter of the Lüneburg Heath, on the banks of the Aller, somewhat to the west of its tributary, the Örtze and about 15 km northwest of Celle. As well as the town itself, the borough of Winsen also includes the villages of Bannetze, Meißendorf, Stedden, Südwinsen, Thören, Walle and Wolthausen.

== History ==
The name of the town is derived from Wynhausen (Wyn = Weideland or meadow). Winsen's church is dedicated to John the Baptist. Because all villages with churches named after this patron saint appeared around 800 it is suspected that this was also when Winsen was founded.

Today Winsen is a favourite local recreation and holiday area and, since 1975, has been recognised officially as a climatic health resort (Luftkurort).

== Politics ==
=== Coat of arms ===
The coat of arms of the town depicts the Stechinelli Gate, one of the town’s monuments and, in between the two gateposts, the coat of arms of Lüneburg, a gold shield with red hearts surrounding a blue lion rampant.

== Culture and places of interest ==
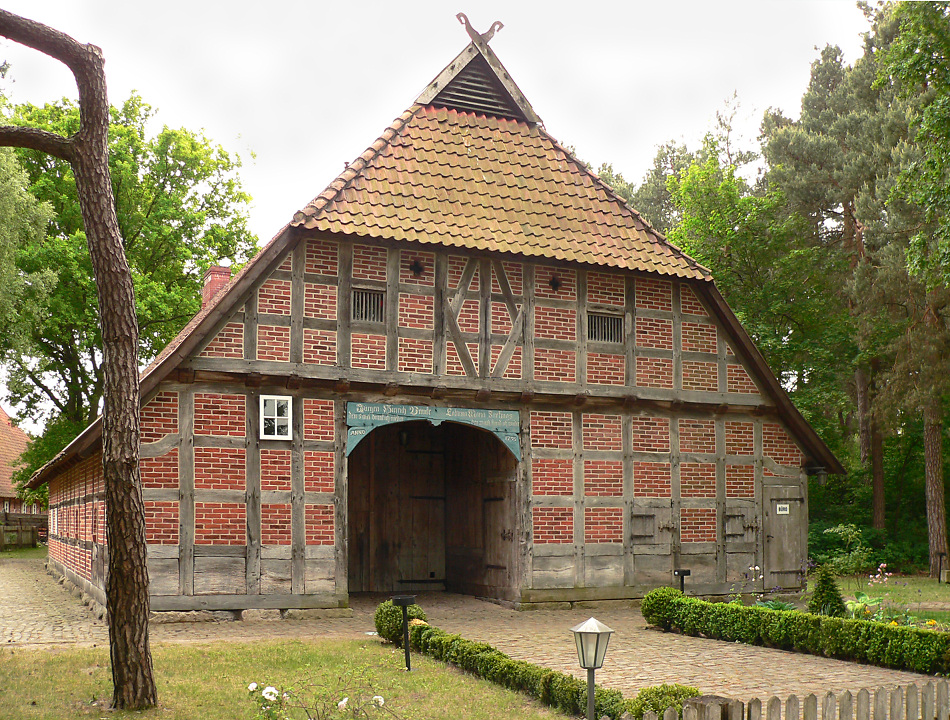
The Fachhallenhaus, Dat groode Hus, in the Winsen Museum Farm

- The nature and bird reserve of Meißendorf Lakes and Bannetzer Moor is the largest stretch of water on the Lüneburg Heath covering a total area of 815 hectares (2,010 acres) including 350 hectares (860 acres) of water.
- The Winsen Museum Farm (Museumshof Winsen) portrays a rural farmstead from the Südheide heath with buildings from the 17th – 19th century as well as Dat groode Hus, a 1795 Low German house or Fachhallenhaus, today the cultural centrepiece of the community.
- The earliest record of the Winsen mills is from 1589. The present-day post mill (Bockwindmühle) was built in 1732 and worked until it closed in 1929. It came into the possession of the town in 1938.
- The church, like the town itself, is presumed to have emerged during the missionary period in Saxony during the 9th century. The Church of St. John the Baptist was built in the 14th century as a Gothic long house, that was extended on its north side in 1597. In 1822 a major expansion of the church building began, which effectively became a new building.
- The Junker Gate (Junkerntor) is one of the oldest still preserved historic buildings in Winsen. It used to be the entrance to the manor house (Rittergut). From 1691 to 1729 the Stechinelli family was enfeoffed with the estate, which is why it is also called the Stechinelli Gate and why the family coat of arms appears on the left hand gate column. The gate itself forms part of Winsen’s coat of arms.
- The Prince’s Stones (Prinzensteine) lie by a track between Winsen and Oldau and recall a decisive battle on 28 May 1388 during the Lüneburg War of Succession (Lüneburger Erbfolgekrieg). According to legend two princes wounded each other mortally at this spot before they realised they were brothers.
- The present-day town hall (Rathaus) was initially built in 1727 as a district office (Amtshaus) but had to be torn down again as the underlying ground was not sufficiently secure. It was then rebuilt in the baroque style. On 4 May 1972 the former district office, which meanwhile had been used as a pub, was given its new purpose as a town hall.
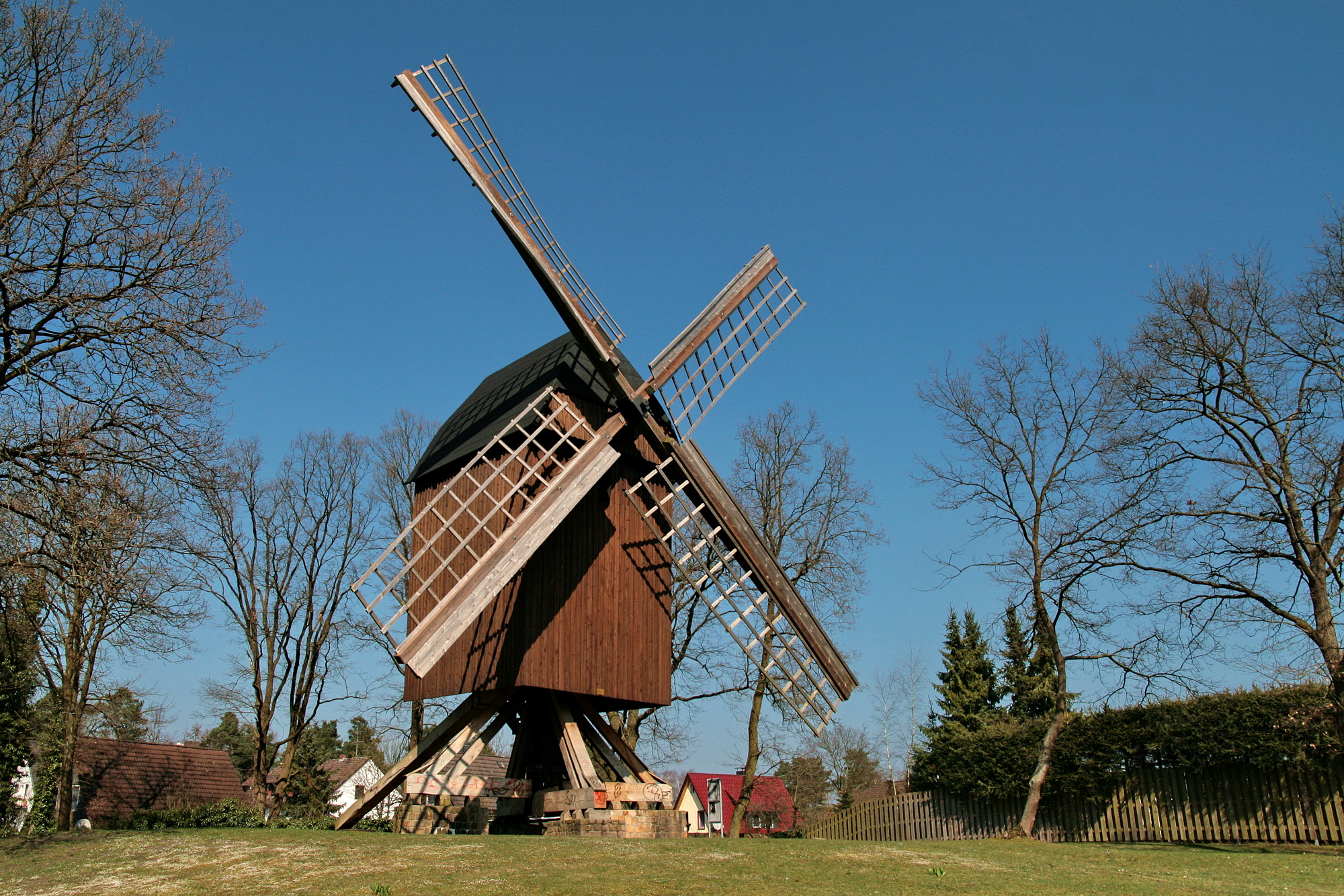
The post mill

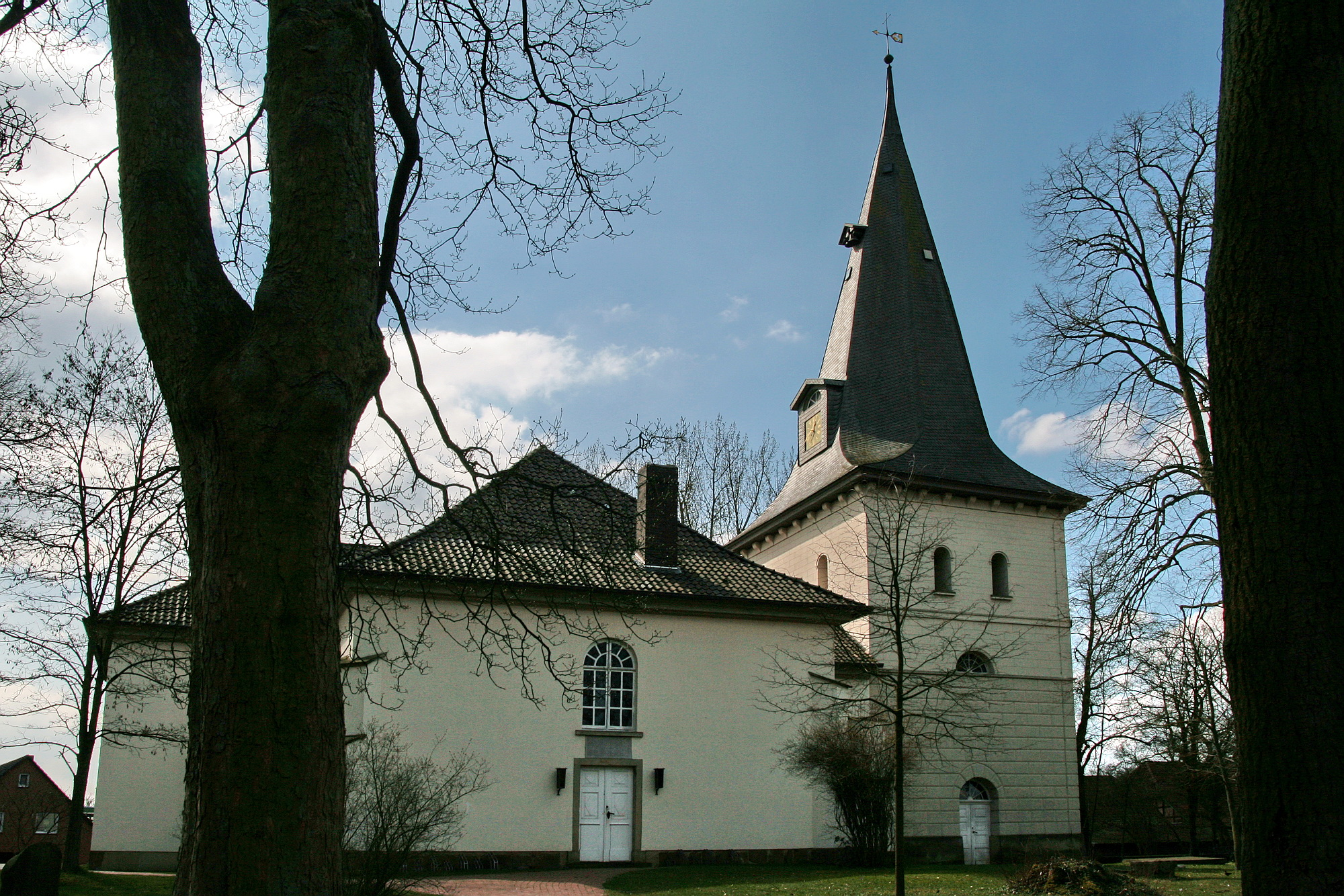
Church of Saint John the Baptist

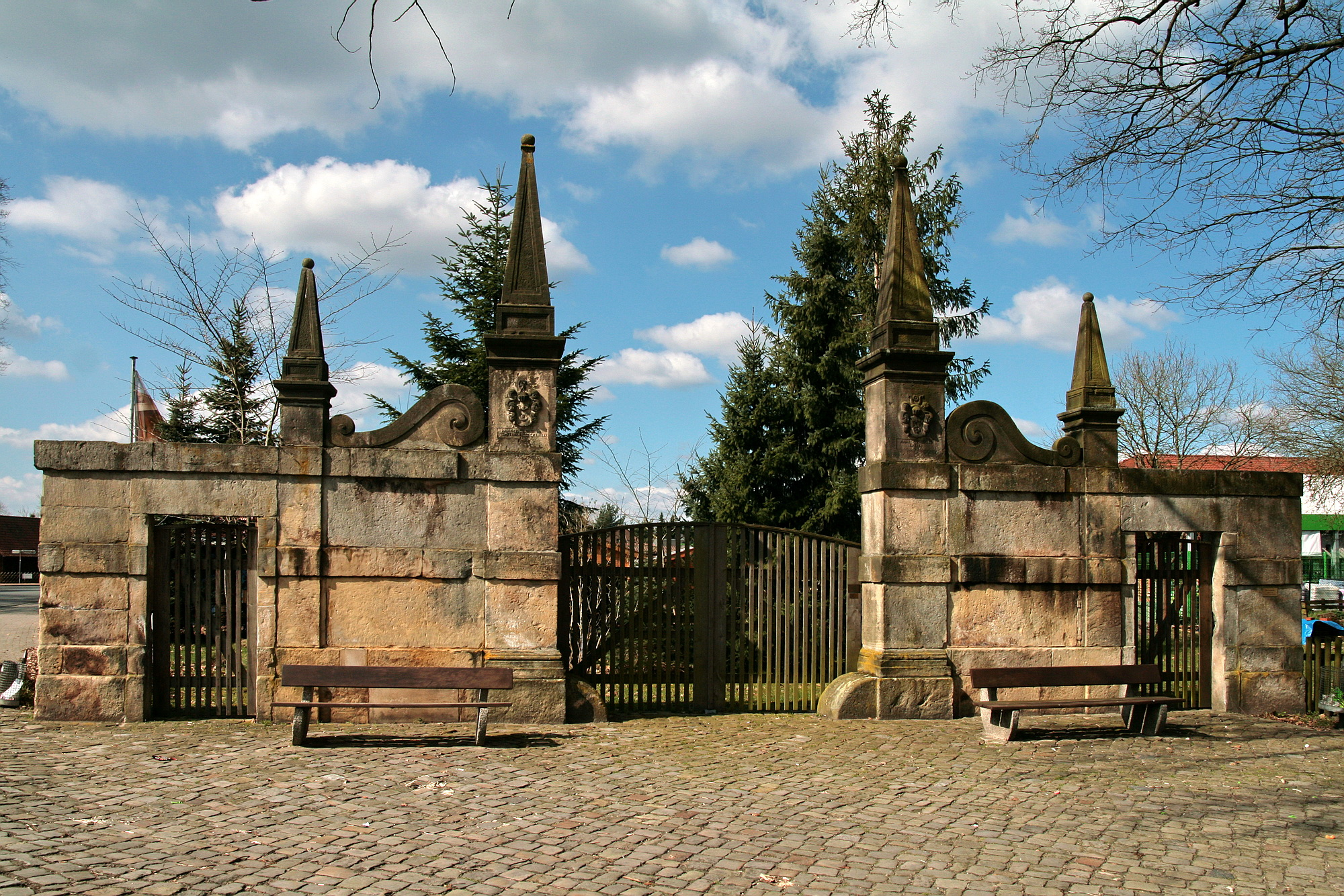
The Junker Gate

== Sons and daughters of the town ==
- Theodor Lohmann (1831–1905), administrative lawyer, civil servant and social reformer, was born in Winsen.
