= Bröckel =

- Municipality
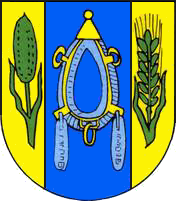
- Coat of arms

- Location of Bröckel within Celle district
- Interactive map of Bröckel
- Location within Germany Location within Lower Saxony
- Coordinates: 52°31′N 10°13′E
- Country: Germany
- State: Lower Saxony
- District: Celle
- Municipal assoc.: Flotwedel
- Subdivisions: 2 Ortsteile

Government
  - Mayor: Heinrich Behrens (CDU)

Area
  - Total: 16.33 km^{2} (6.31 sq mi)
- Elevation: 44 m (144 ft)

Population (2025-12-31)
  - Total: 2,009
  - Density: 123.0/km^{2} (318.6/sq mi)
- Time zone: UTC+01:00 (CET)
  - Summer (DST): UTC+02:00 (CEST)
- Postal codes: 29356
- Dialling codes: 05144
- Vehicle registration: CE

Bröckel (German pronunciation: [ˈbʁøːkl̩], pronounced with a long ö) is a municipality in the district of Celle, in Lower Saxony, Germany. It belongs to the collective municipality of Flotwedel with its seat in Wienhausen.

== Geography ==
Bröckel lies southeast of Celle. The River Fuhse, which separates Bröckel from the neighbouring parish of Uetze flows past about two kilometers south of the village.

=== Parish divisions ===
The parish contains the hamlets of Katzhorn and Weghaus.

== History ==
The first recorded mention of the parish was in 1215. The name of the village is derived from Brockelhe (Brauck = Bruch i.e. moor or marsh).

== Politics ==
=== Council ===
The parish council of Bröckel comprises 11 members, including the chair (Bürgermeister):

- CDU − 8 seats
- SPD − 2 seats

(as at: local elections of 10 September 2006)

=== Bürgermeister ===
The voluntary Bürgermeister Heinrich Behrens was elected on 9 September 2001.

=== Coat of arms ===
Emblazonment: "in gold a broad blue stripe, on which is a silver horse collar decorated with gold, to the right a green ear of reed, left by a green ear of corn."

== Economy and infrastructure ==
In Bröckel is the indoor park of Viva Arena.

=== Transport ===
Bröckel lies on the B 214 federal road which runs around the village on a bypass.

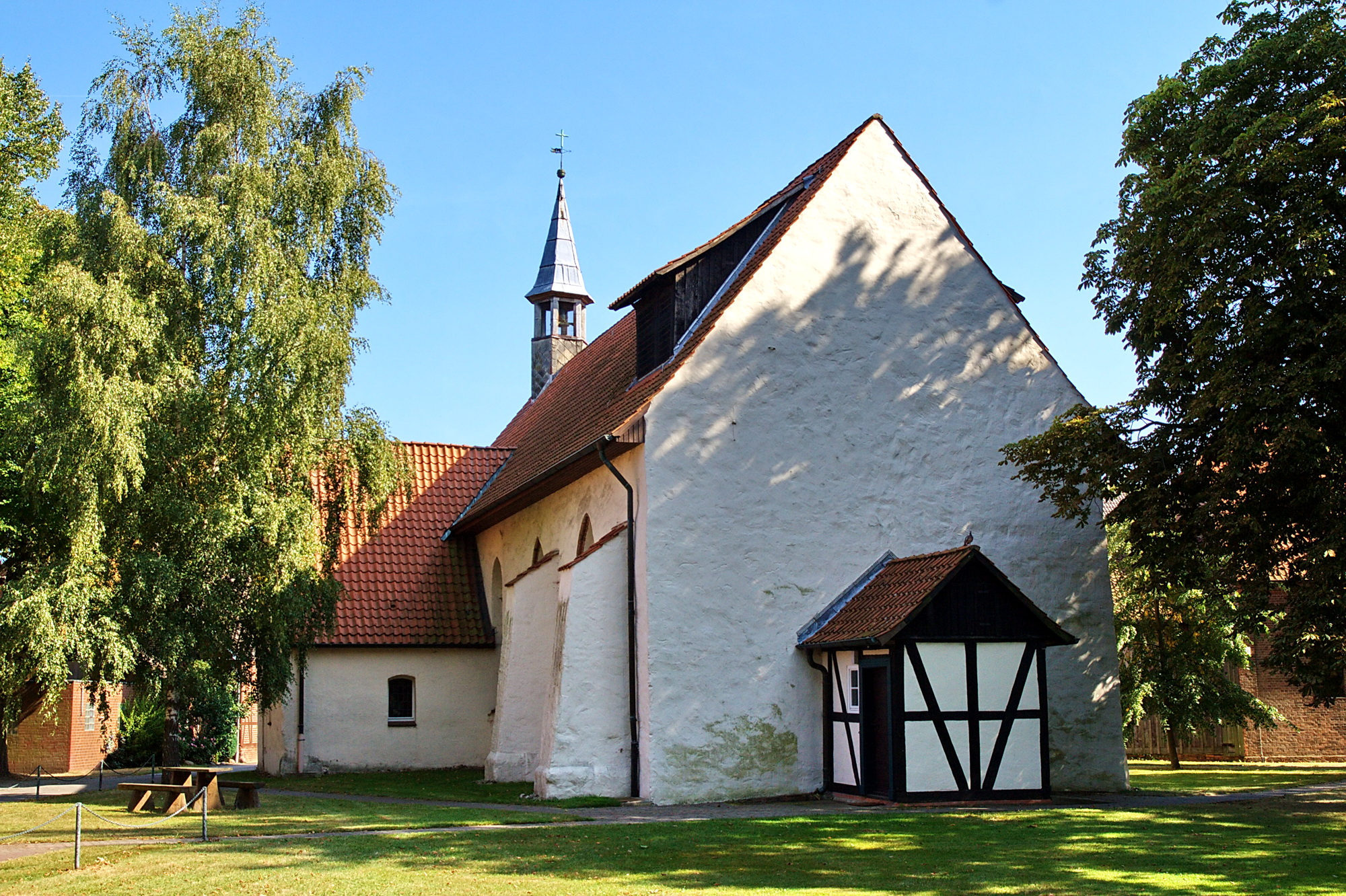
St. Mary's

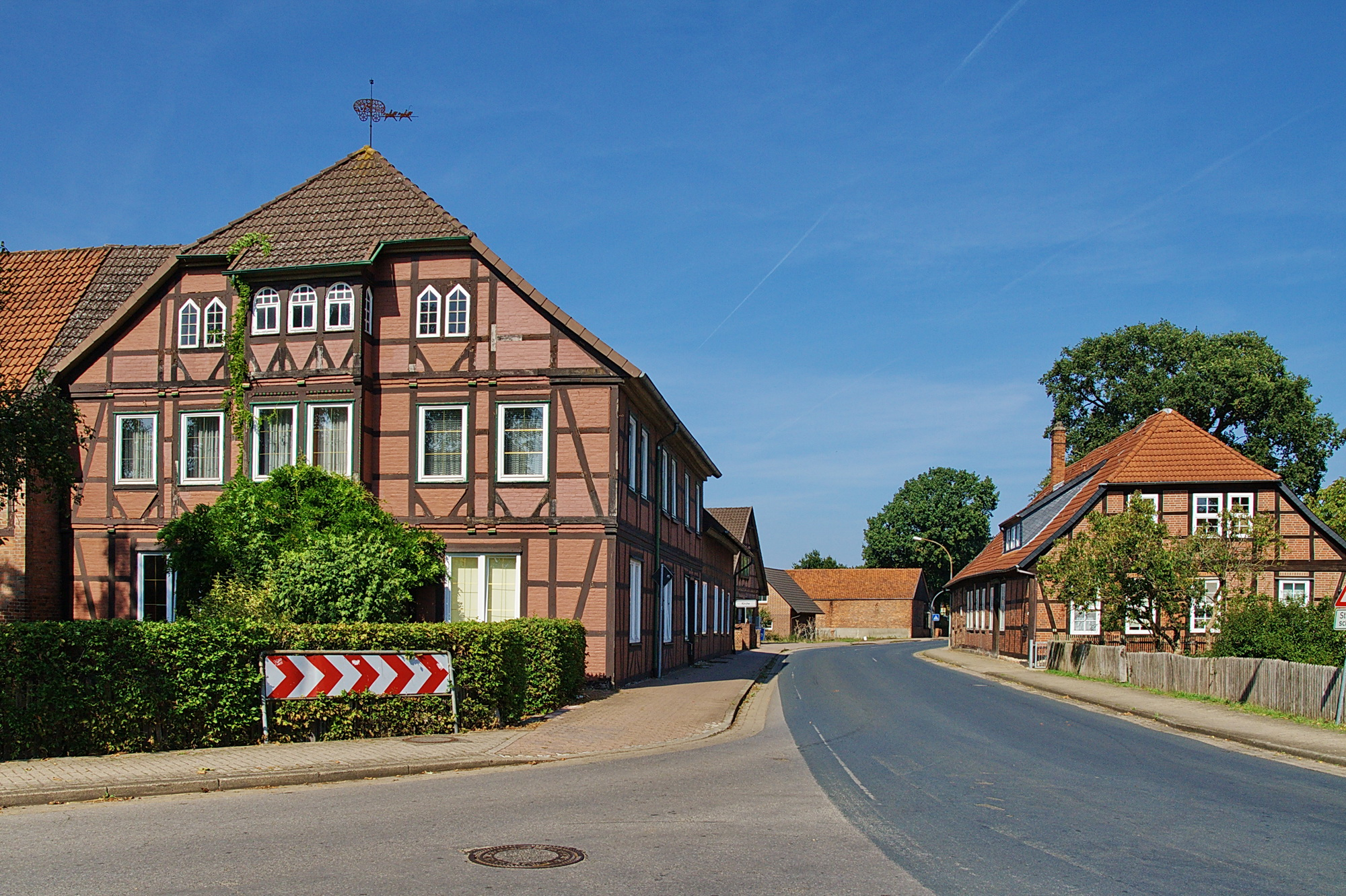
Village scene

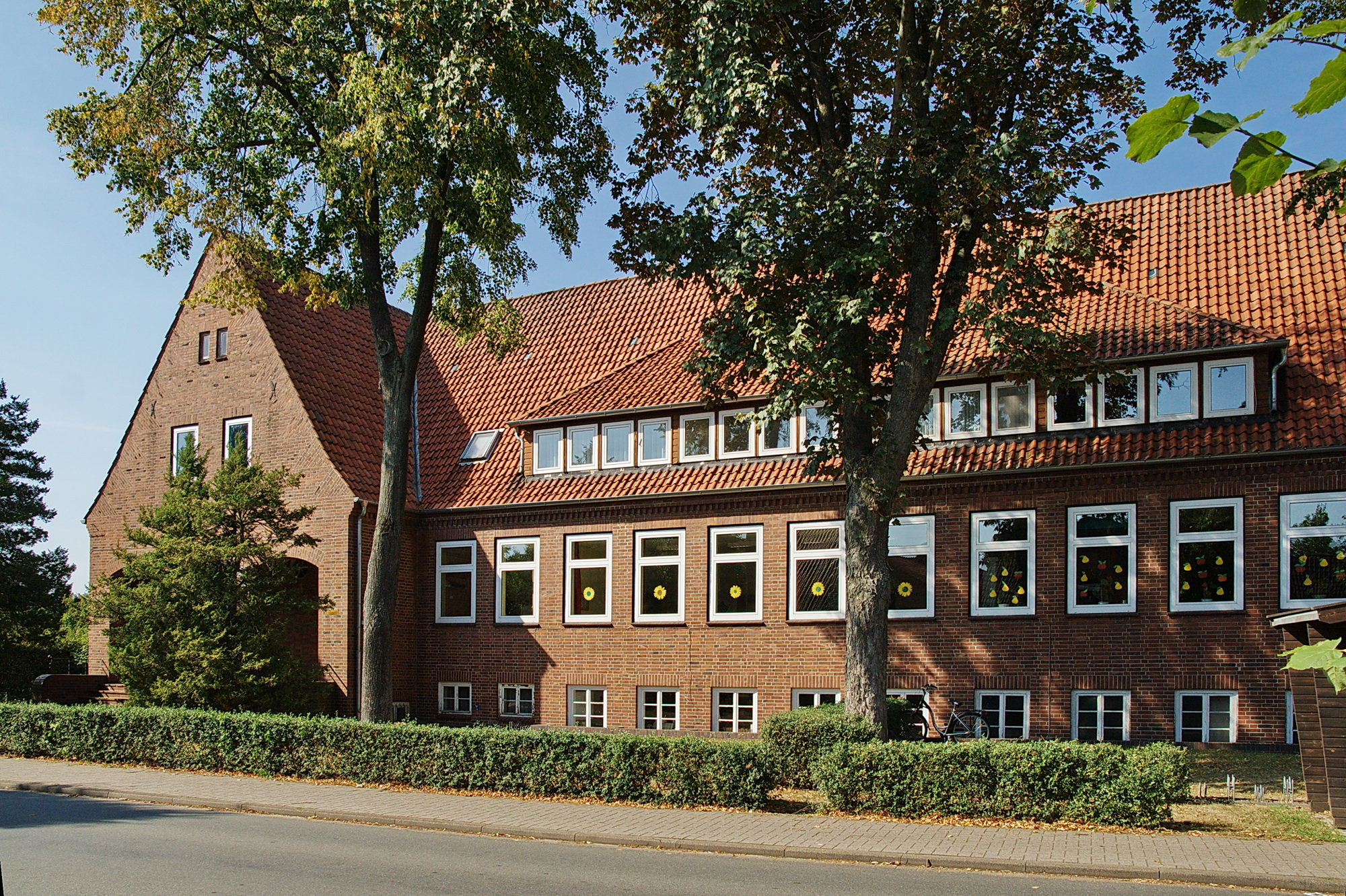
Primary school

== Sources ==
- Friedrich Barenscheer: Chronik des Frachtfahrerdorfes Bröckel, 1963, Selbstverlag der Gemeinde Bröckel, Schriftenreihe des Lönsbund Celle Band 3, 169 Seiten
