= Weesen =

Weesen may refer to:

- Weesen, Switzerland, a village in the canton of St. Gallen
- Weesen, Germany, a village in Lower Saxony
