= Ahnsbeck =

- Municipality
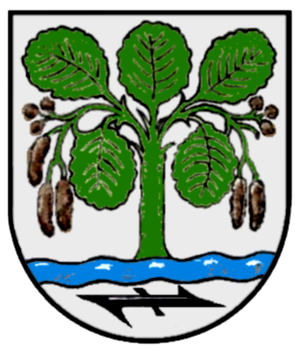
- Coat of arms

- Location of Ahnsbeck within Celle district
- Interactive map of Ahnsbeck
- Location within Germany Location within Lower Saxony
- Coordinates: 52°36′39″N 10°17′26″E
- Country: Germany
- State: Lower Saxony
- District: Celle
- Municipal assoc.: Lachendorf

Government
  - Mayor: Ulrich Kaiser

Area
  - Total: 20.7 km^{2} (8.0 sq mi)
- Elevation: 54 m (177 ft)

Population (2025-12-31)
  - Total: 1,646
  - Density: 79.5/km^{2} (206/sq mi)
- Time zone: UTC+01:00 (CET)
  - Summer (DST): UTC+02:00 (CEST)
- Postal codes: 29353
- Dialling codes: 05145
- Vehicle registration: CE
- Website: www.lachendorf.de

Ahnsbeck (German pronunciation: [ˈaːnsbeːk]) is a municipality in the district of Celle, in Lower Saxony, Germany. It is situated at the southern border of the Lüneburg Heath, 10 km eastern of the city of Celle. It is part of the collective municipality of Lachendorf.

== History ==
The Village of Ahnsbeck is first mentioned in the 13th century under the name of "Alrebekesa", meaning Floodplain of the Alder-stream, which also reflects in the coat of arms.

Until 31 December 2004 Ahnsbeck belonged to the Regierungsbezirk (government region) Lüneburg.
