= Thoren (disambiguation) =

Thören is a village on the southern edge of the Lüneburg Heath, Lower Saxony, Germany.

Thoren, Thören (German) and Thorén (Swedish) may also refer to:

== People ==
- Arne Thorén (1927–2003), Swedish journalist and diplomat
- Jens Thorén, Swedish former Magic: The Gathering player
- Johanna Thorén (1889–1969), Norwegian elected official and business owner
- Marcus Thorén (born 1971), Swedish taekwondo practitioner
- Michele Thoren Bond (born 1953), American diplomat
- Per Thorén (1885–1962), Swedish figure skater
- Petra Thorén (born 1969), Finnish tennis player
- Skip Thoren (born 1943), American basketball player
- Sverker Thorén (born 1955), Swedish politician
- Torgil Thorén (1892–1982), Swedish Navy officer

== Fictional characters ==
- Thoren (elf), in the animated TV show The Secret World of Santa Claus
- Thoren, in the animated series Winx Club

== See also ==
- Thoran
