= Walle (Winsen) =

- Ortschaft of Winsen (Aller)
- Interactive map of Walle
- Location within Germany Location within Lower Saxony
- Coordinates: 52°44′07″N 9°55′35″E
- Country: Germany
- State: Lower Saxony
- District: Celle
- Town: Winsen (Aller)
- Elevation: 56 m (184 ft)
- Time zone: UTC+01:00 (CET)
  - Summer (DST): UTC+02:00 (CEST)
- Postal codes: 29308
- Dialling codes: 05143

Walle (German pronunciation: [ˈvalə]) is a village and Ortschaft (municipal division) of the municipality of Winsen (Aller) in Celle district, Lower Saxony, on the Lüneburg Heath in Germany.

== Geography ==
Walle lies on a country road between Winsen (Aller) and Bergen on the southern perimeter of the Lüneburg Heath in Lower Saxony. A forest lane gives it access to the B3 federal road between Celle and Bergen. The little village with under 1,000 inhabitants is situated on a small elevation about 60 metres (200 ft) above Winsen (Aller).

== History ==
Walle is divided into an older part 'below' on the country road and a more recent settlement 'above'. It grew up around a brickworks that has since been closed and whose clay pit became the Achimsee lake which is now in private ownership. For that reason the village is also called Die Ziegelei ("The Brickworks"). The older part of the settlement, referred to locally as Das Dorf ("The Village"), consists of old farmhouses, a kindergarten and a sports club.

== Administration ==
Instead of political parties, Walle has a village council. The commitment of members of its various clubs and societies as well as all other villagers however enables the small community to continue to develop despite its shrinking public funding. The village council is chaired by Reiner Wilke (SPD).

== Recreation and points of interest ==
In addition there is a large shooting and sports club as well as a marching band with about 30 members. The Bruderbaum ("Brother's Tree") stands in the forest east of the village and is surrounded by many a heathland legend. There is also internationally renowned stud farm, the Amselhof.
