= Stedden =

- Ortsteil of Winsen
- Interactive map of Stedden
- Location within Germany Location within Lower Saxony
- Coordinates: 52°39′38″N 9°57′44″E
- Country: Germany
- State: Lower Saxony
- District: Celle
- Municipality: Winsen
- Elevation: 37 m (121 ft)

Population
  - Total: 300
- Time zone: UTC+01:00 (CET)
  - Summer (DST): UTC+02:00 (CEST)
- Postal codes: 29308
- Dialling codes: 05143

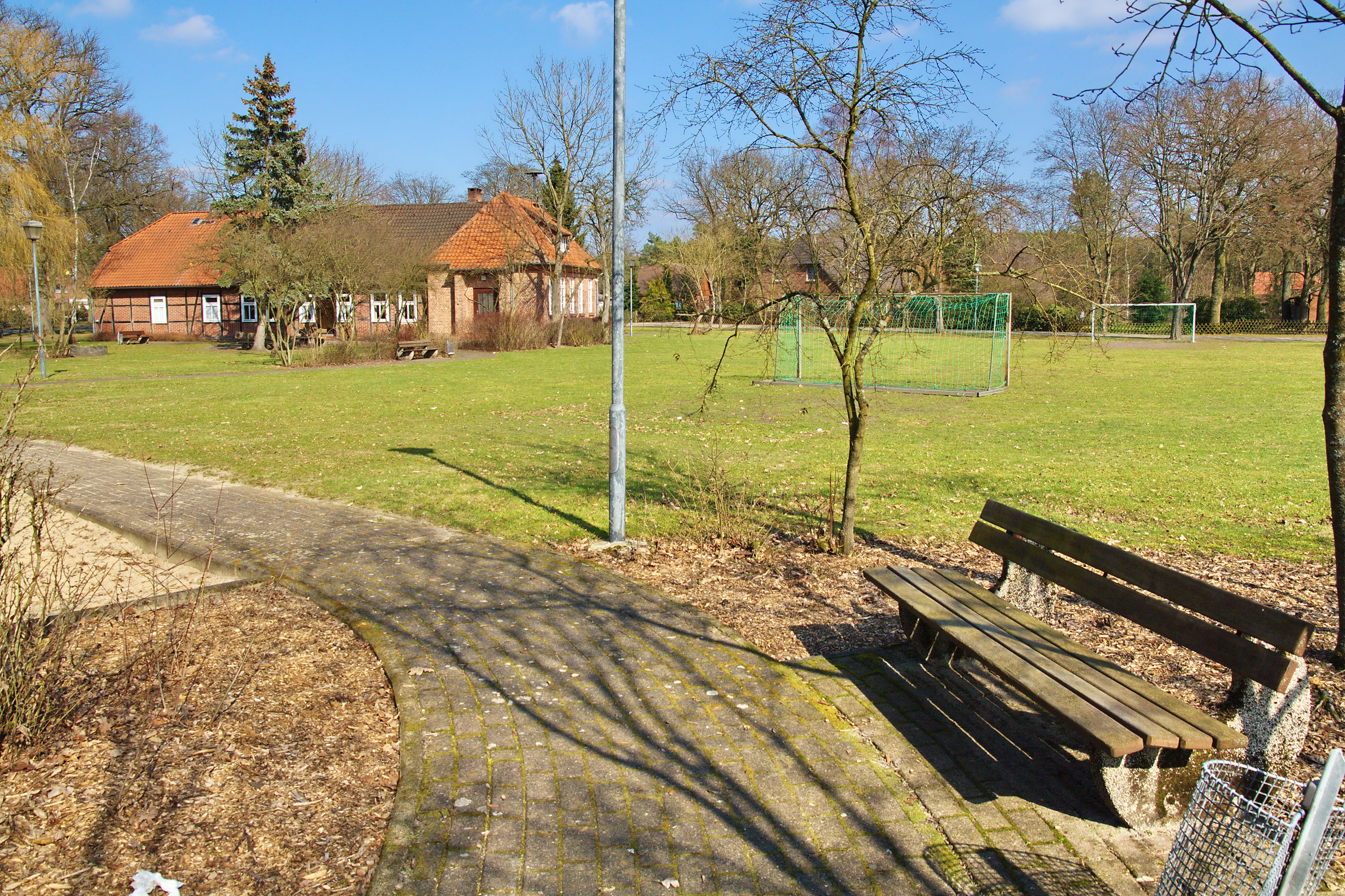
Village hall

Stedden is a village in the borough of Winsen (Aller) in the Lower Saxon district of Celle in North Germany. It lies on the river Aller and close to the river Örtze and has a population of just over 300. In 1985 it celebrated its 750th anniversary.

== Politics ==
Stedden has a joint parish council with the neighbouring village of Wolthausen.

The council chair is Christian Peters (CDU).
