= Weesen (Hermannsburg) =

- Ortsteil of Südheide
- Interactive map of Weesen
- Location within Germany Location within Lower Saxony
- Coordinates: 52°50′2″N 10°8′5″E
- Country: Germany
- State: Lower Saxony
- District: Celle
- Municipality: Südheide
- Elevation: 64 m (210 ft)

Population
  - Total: 520
- Time zone: UTC+01:00 (CET)
  - Summer (DST): UTC+02:00 (CEST)
- Postal codes: 29320
- Dialling codes: 05052

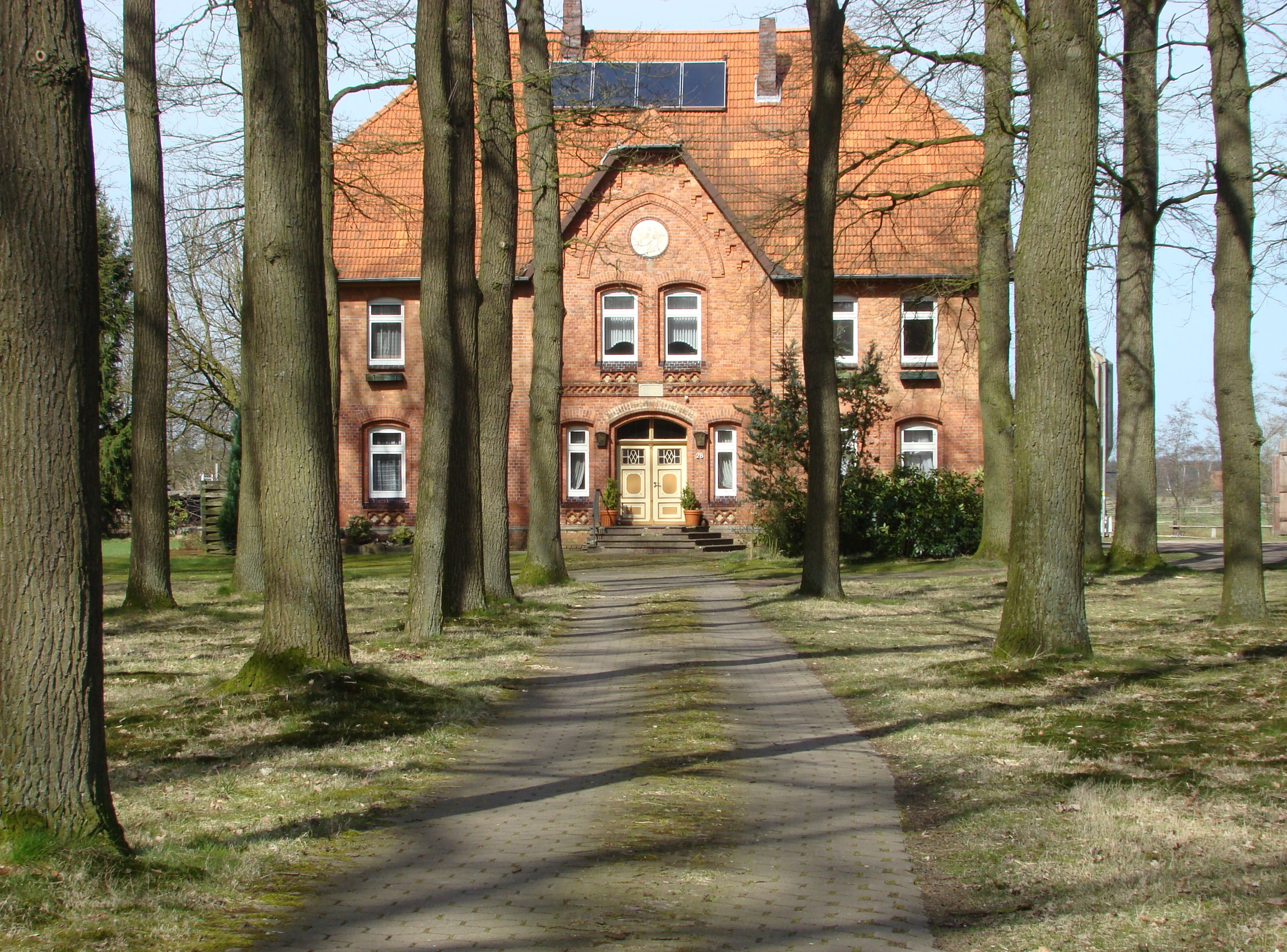
Former Sattelhof

Weesen (German pronunciation: [ˈveːzn̩]) is a village belonging to the municipality (Einheitsgemeinde) of Südheide in the north of Celle district in Germany. It lies within the Südheide Nature Park, on the Lüneburg Heath, about 1 km east of Hermannsburg and currently has around 520 inhabitants. Until its incorporation into Hermannsburg as part of the Lower Saxon regional and administrative reforms in 1973, Weesen belonged to the largest municipality in Lower Saxony by area. A stream, the Weesener Bach, flows through the village which, since 1999, has been placed under conservation protection along its entire length. On several of the farms there are still old Treppenspeicher storage barns from the 19th century.

== Weesen station ==
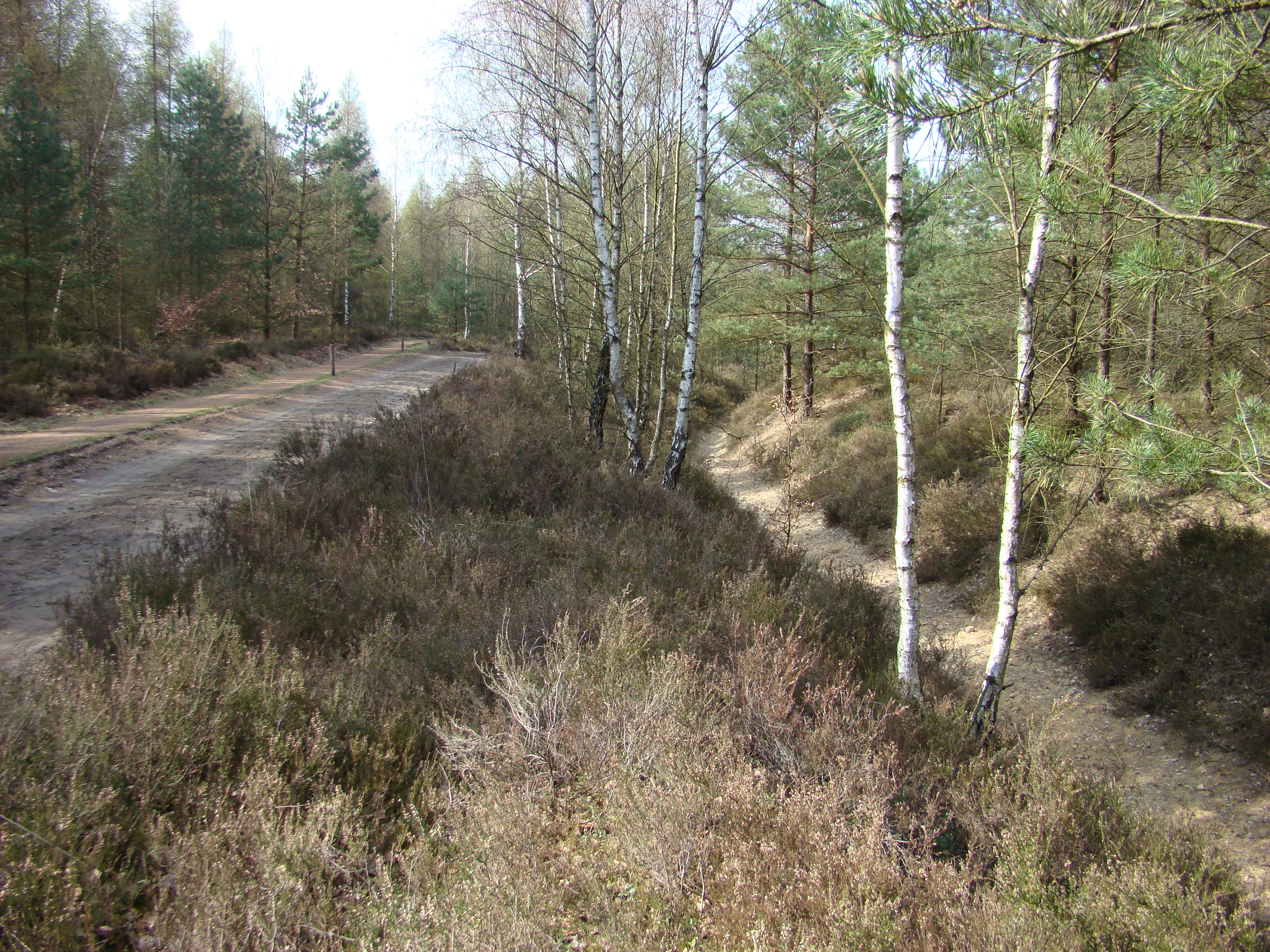
Am Citronenberg. Right: the old trackbed of the narrow gauge railway by the path

In 1892 a railway line for a narrow gauge was built from Uelzen via Weesen to Celle. The line was about 70 km long. This was a military exercise and the construction gang comprised four Prussian, one Bavarian and four reserve companies. On 14 July 1892 work began on planning the route. Construction lasted from 18 to 26 July. The route was chosen because it had few obstacles and because the heath area was very remote. As a result, the cost of compensation for crop damage could be kept very low. But several small hills and the bogs in particular presented the troops with greater difficulty than they had envisaged. From 28 July to 12 August 1892 regular trains ran on the so-called Feldbahn: fourteen trains per day running in each direction. On 30 July a forest fire broke out and caused significant disruption. The aim of the exercise was to determine how in time of war, materiel could be transported to the front by narrow gauge railway as quickly as possible. In the First World War a narrow gauge line was also built to the Western Front in France. The Chief of the General Staff of the Army, Lieutenant General Alfred Count von Schlieffen inspected the work personally. On 8 August 1892 372 soldiers, 48 NCOs and 20 officers turned up to dismantle the Feldbahn again. From 15 August to 20 August the line was lifted. On 22 September 1892 all the materiel was dismantled, loaded and transported away. In Weesen today there is nothing to indicate that there was a railway, however a road is still called Bahnhof ("station"). Near the farm of Severloh, east of the Bornrieth Moor the trackbed of the railway can still be clearly seen at the Citronenberg as a ditch along the side of a track.

== Weesen Conservation Society ==
On 4 February 1984 the Weesen Conservation Society (Verein „Naturschutzfreunde Weesen) was founded as a group of Weesen villagers to oppose the mechanical clearing of the Weesener Bach. The stream was deepened using an excavator which caused massive ecological damage to the stream that is still having an impact today in part. The purpose of the society is the conservation and care of the stream within the parish of Weesen. This aim is intended to be achieved by careful hand clearing, the planting of alder trees, the opening of side ditches and the use of gravel. In addition, the care of landscape, nature and habitat is an important task for the society. Since its foundation the society has developed a range of other activities:

=== Planting and bird protection ===
In the mid 1980s the state of Lower Saxony directed subordinate conservation authorities to institute a programme of hedge planting in the countryside. The society took this programme on and planted numerous bushes and trees along the field tracks with the agreement of the district of Celle, the parish of Hermannsburg and land owners. In addition to providing wind protection to reduce the erosion of arable fields, these hedges have also provided protected areas for small game, such as the grey partridge. They are also an attractive feature for both locals and visitors. Within and without the village all avenues have been planted, mainly with lime trees, hawthorn and rowan, but in places with fruit trees as well. These measures have been funded by the society as well as the district. One particular planting and conservation measures are the orchards. In 1992 a 0.75 hectares (1.9 acres) field was rented by the society and planted with old species of fruit tree. Insects of all types and many species of bird can thrive here where they are well protected. For several years the extraction of gravel and sand on the Hundsberg has been forbidden. The parish of Hermannsburg rented the land in 2007 to the Weesen Conservation Society, who enclosed the area with hedges. The vegetation planted around this small hill now creates a picturesque scene. Using its own funds and a great deal of labour the society has put up over 1,000 nest boxes, including 10 owl and 10 bat boxes, around Weesen, which are cleaned during the winter. A record is kept of the occupation of the boxes.

=== Transformer house ===
A relict from the early days of electrification is the old transformer station by the sports field. This was built around 1914 and was to be demolished in 1991. The society arranged however for the electricity company responsible, the SVO, to transfer the building to the society for its use and care. With the support of the parish of Hermannsburg it was restored and now acts as a home for bats and owls.

=== Treppenspeicher barns in Eichenhain ===
In 1992 a historic Treppenspeicher barn was built in the centre of the village next to the fire station as part of the village renewal programme (Dorferneuerungsprogramm) with considerable support from the society and other supporters from Weesen. The attic was converted into a society room for meetings.

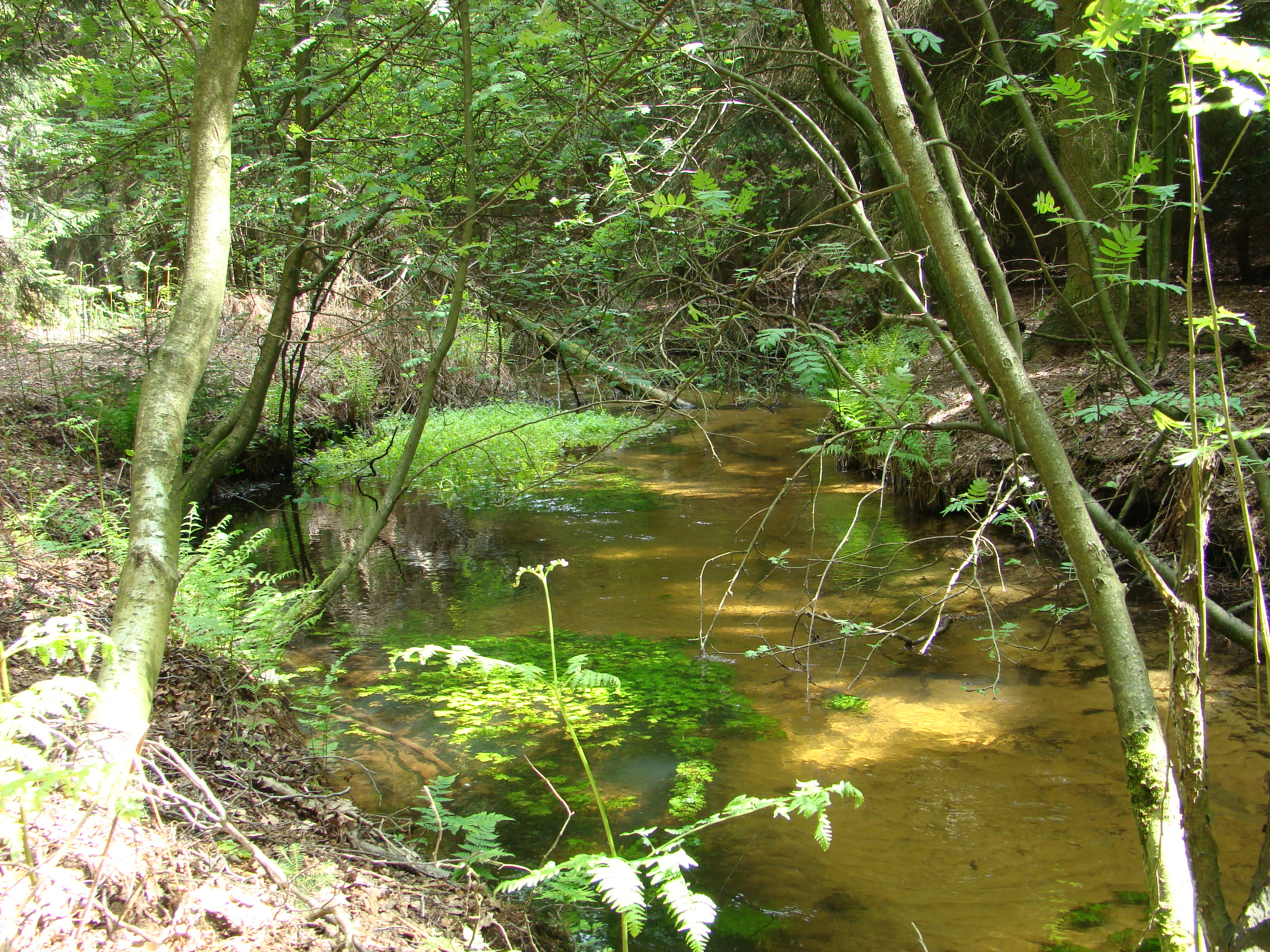
The Weesener Bach between Lutterloh and Weesen

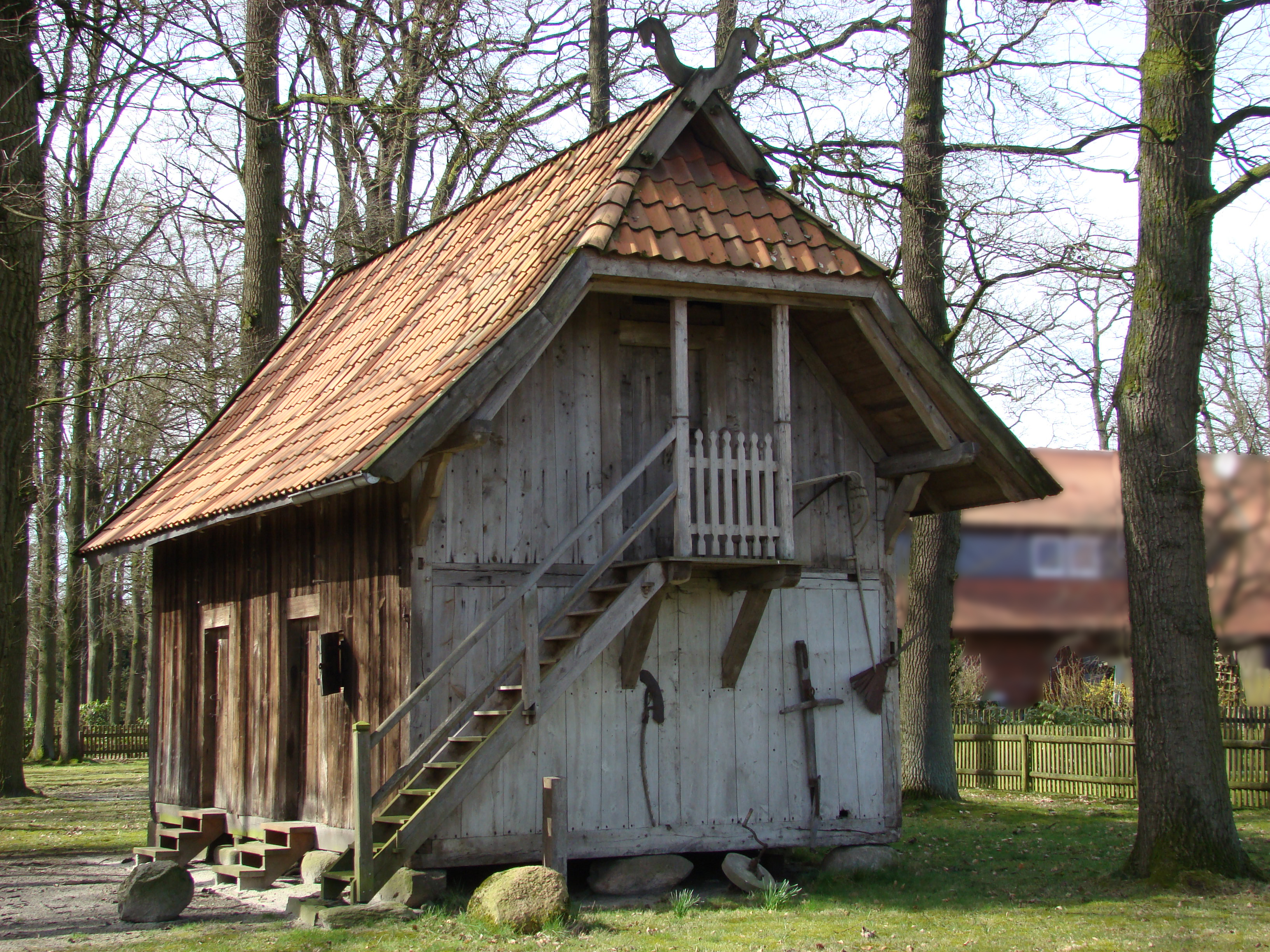
Treppenspeicher from 1808
