= Heinrich Severloh =

German soldier (1923–2006)

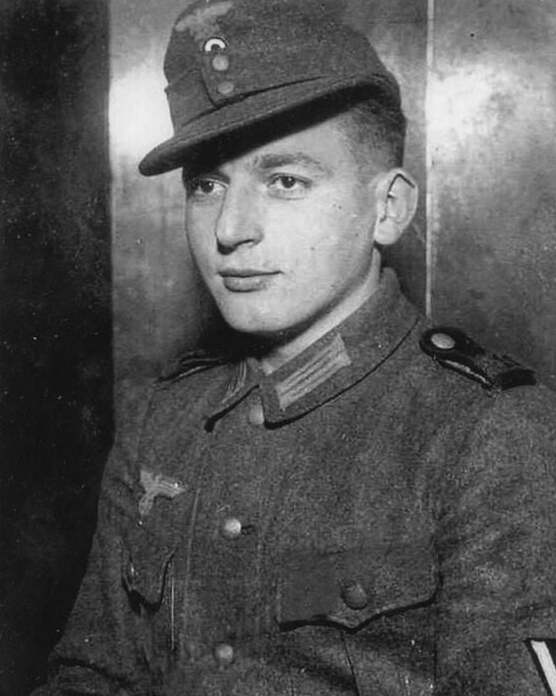
- Severloh during World War II
- Born: 23 June 1923; Metzingen, Weimar Republic
- Died: 14 January 2006 (aged 82); Lachendorf, Germany
- Military career
- Allegiance: Nazi Germany
- Branch: Heer
- Service years: 1941–1944
- Rank: Gefreiter
- Nickname: "The Beast of Omaha"
- Units: 19th Light Artillery Division, 321st Artillery Regiment, 352nd Infantry Division
- Conflicts: World War II: D-Day

Heinrich "Hein" Severloh (23 June 1923 – 14 January 2006) was a German soldier in the 352nd Infantry Division of the Wehrmacht stationed in Normandy in 1944. Severloh became notable for his memoir WN 62 – Erinnerungen an Omaha Beach Normandie, 6. Juni 1944 and translated into English as WN 62: A German Soldier’s Memories of the Defence of Omaha Beach, Normandy, 6 June 1944 (Note: ISBN 978-3932922237) in which he claims that, as a machine gunner, he inflicted over 1,000, possibly 2,000, casualties on Allied soldiers landing on Omaha Beach on D-Day.

The claims made in his memoir, ghostwritten by Helmut Konrad von Keusgen, first published in 2000 with an expanded edition in 2002, are regarded by historians as implausible, particularly given that total Allied casualties, (killed, wounded, and missing), across the 10 km (6 mile) length of Omaha Beach are estimated at around 2,400.

== Early life ==
Severloh was born into a farming family in Metzingen in the Lüneburg Heath area of North Germany, close to the small city of Celle.

== Service in the Wehrmacht ==
Conscripted into the Wehrmacht on 23 July 1941, at the age of 18, Severloh was assigned to the 19th Light Artillery Replacement Division in Hanover. In August, he was transferred to France to join the 3rd Battery of the 321st Artillery Regiment, where he trained as a dispatch rider. In December 1942, he was sent to the Eastern Front and assigned to the rear of his division to drive sleighs. As punishment for making dissenting remarks, he was forced to perform physical exertions that left him with permanent health problems and necessitated six-month convalescence in a hospital. After this, he went on leave to his family's farm to help gather the harvest.

In October 1943, Severloh was sent for non-commissioned officer training in Brunswick, but was recalled after less than a month to rejoin his unit which had been reclassified as the 352nd Infantry Division and was stationed in Normandy.

== Omaha Beach ==
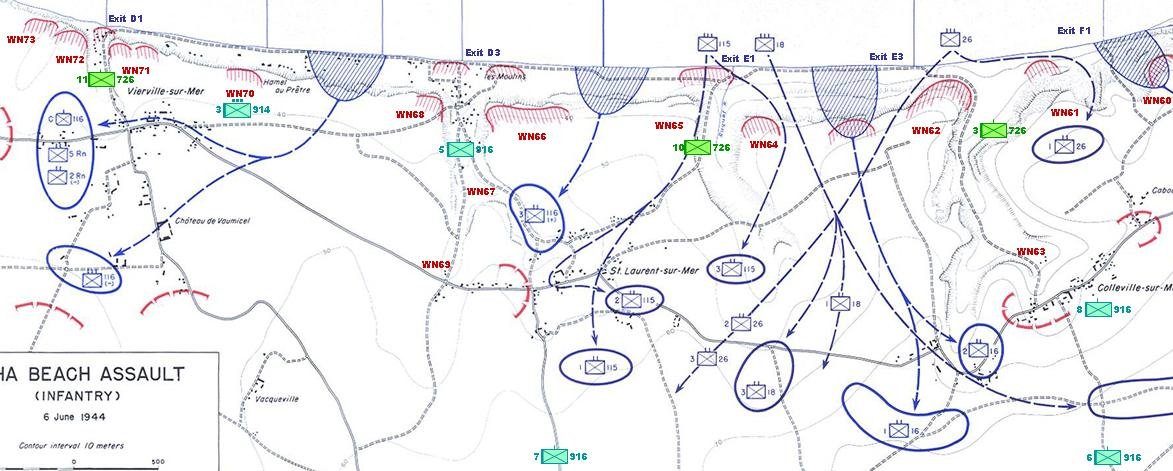
Location of resistance nest 62 (WN 62)

Omaha Beach extends for 10 km (6 miles) from east of Sainte-Honorine-des-Pertes to west of Vierville-sur-Mer. The beach defences at Omaha consisted of eight concrete bunkers containing 75 mm or greater artillery, 35 pillboxes, 18 anti-tank guns, six mortar pits, 35 Nebelwerfer (multi-barrel rocket launchers), 85 machine gun nests, 6 tank turrets and supporting infantry.

Infantry deployments on the Beach consisted of five companies concentrated at 15 strongpoints called Widerstandsnester ("resistance nests"), numbered WN-60 in the east to WN-74 in the west. Severloh was part of WN-62, the largest strongpoint defending Omaha Beach.

The American plan of attack divided Omaha Beach into ten sectors, codenamed Able, Baker, Charlie, Dog Green, Dog White, Dog Red, Easy Green, Easy Red, Fox Green, and Fox Red. WN-62 at the eastern side of Omaha Beach overlooked both Easy Red and Fox Green sectors.

=== Widerstandsnest 62 ===
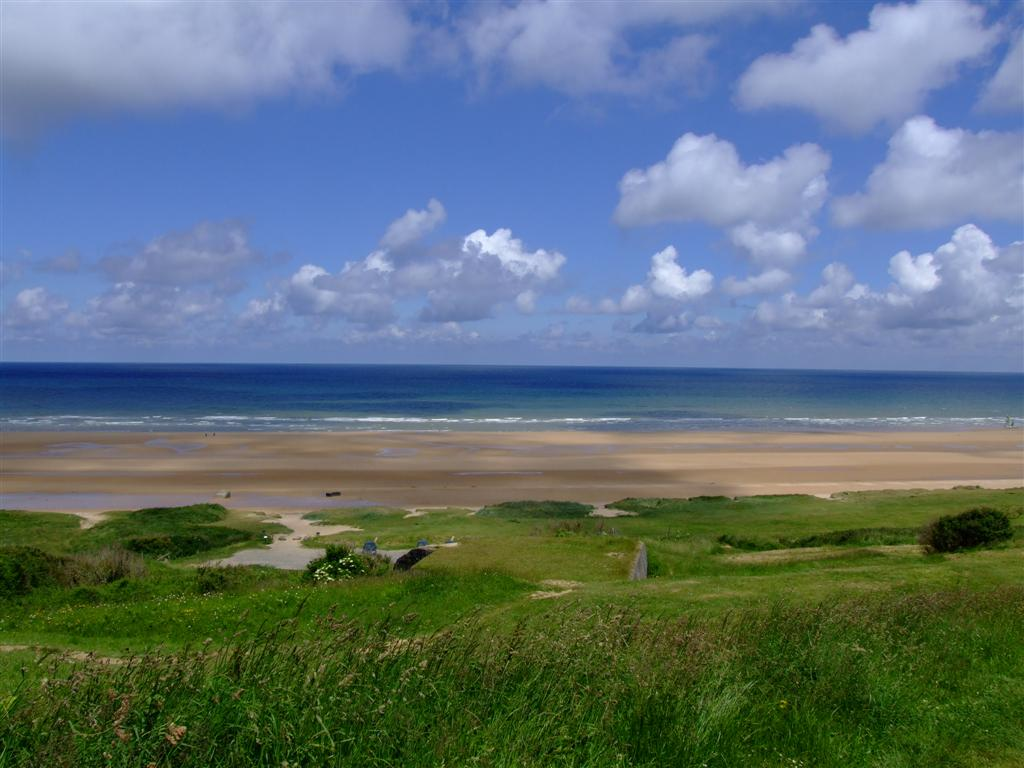
View out of a foxhole from WN-62

WN-62 covered an area 332 m (1,089 ft) long by 324 m (1,063 ft) between 12 and 50 m (39 and 164 ft) above the beach, depending on the distance from the shore, with a good overview of the beach area. The foxhole Severloh fired from (Note: 49°21′36.34″N 0°50′49.43″W) was 170 m (560 ft) from the sea wall and around 450 m (1,480 ft) from the landing area of the first wave of Higgins Boats.

On D-Day (6 June 1944) WN-62 was manned by 27 members of the 716th Static Infantry Division and 13 members of Severloh's 352nd Division, whose task was to direct fire of the 10.5 cm howitzer artillery batteries located five kilometres inland at Houtteville. Defences included two type H669 concrete casemates, one empty and the other with a 75 mm artillery piece, a 50 mm anti-tank gun, two 50 mm mortars, a twin-barrelled 7.92 mm MG 34 machine gun on an anti-aircraft mount and two prewar Polish Ckm wz.30 machine guns. Another 50 mm anti-tank gun covered the rear, and the perimeter was ringed by barbed wire and anti personnel mines.

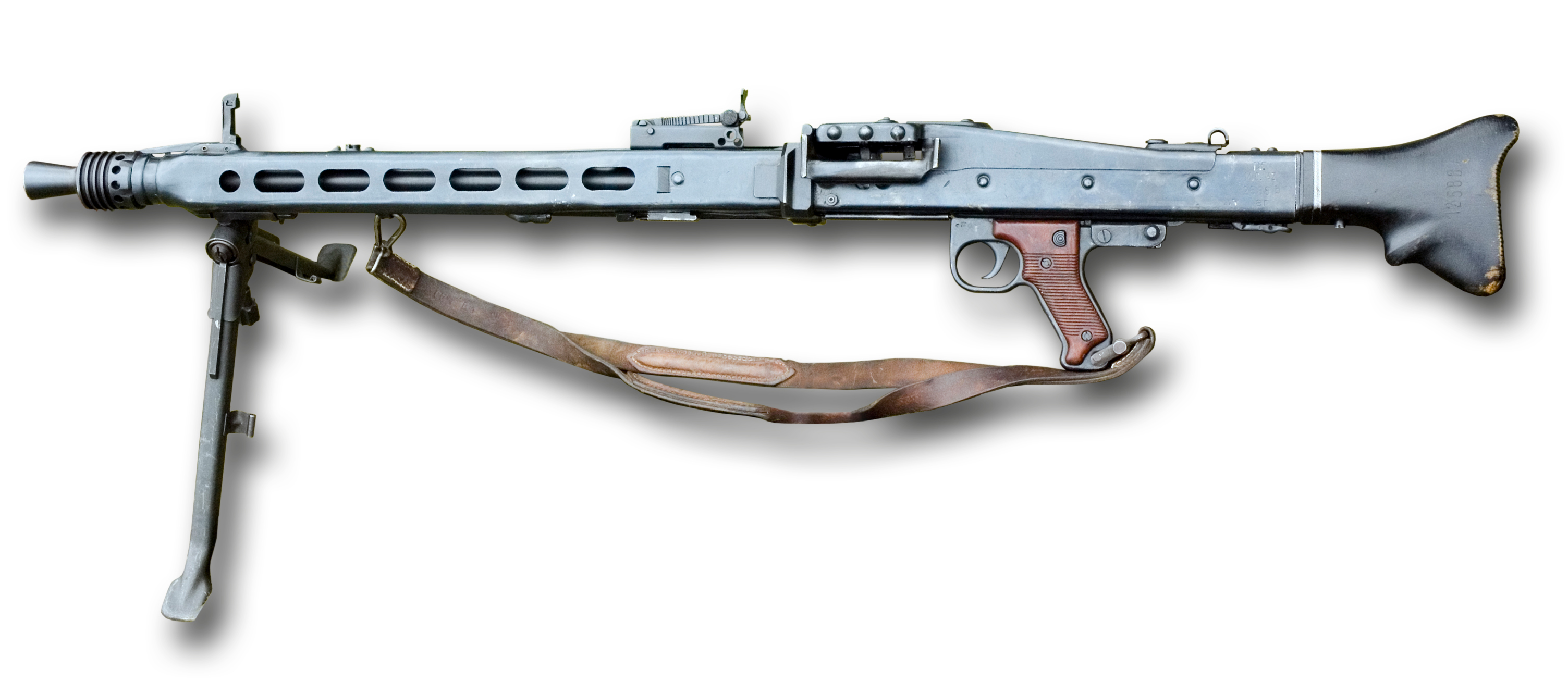
An MG 42, none were in WN-62

Severloh was assigned to a Senior Lieutenant Bernhard Frerking as an orderly. While Frerking coordinated the artillery fire of the battery at Houtteville from a bunker, Severloh says he manned an MG 42 machine gun, and fired on approaching American troops with the machine gun and two Karabiner 98k rifles; while a sergeant whom he did not know, kept him supplied with ammunition from a nearby ammo bunker until 15:30.

According to his own post-war account, Heinrich Severloh claimed to have fired approximately 13,500 rounds from an MG 42, along with a further 400 rounds from two Karabiner 98k rifles during the D-Day landings at Omaha Beach. Based on an average weight of 30 grams per linked MG 42 round and 27 grams per rifle round, the total quantity of 7.92×57mm Mauser ammunition would have weighed over 415 kilograms.

Interviewed in 2004, he said: "It was definitely at least 1,000 men, most likely more than 2,000. But I do not know how many men I shot. It was awful. Thinking about it makes me want to throw up."

While these figures appear across several accounts, they are based solely on Severloh’s personal memory, expressed over half a century after the event. Historians remain sceptical as his numbers imply a rate of fire, and hit ratio that experts consider implausible.

=== Surrender and captivity ===
Severloh retreated to the nearby village of Colleville-sur-Mer with Kurt Warnecke where they surrendered the next day. Lt. Frerking, along with others from the artillery observation post, was killed near the communications bunker by American fire.

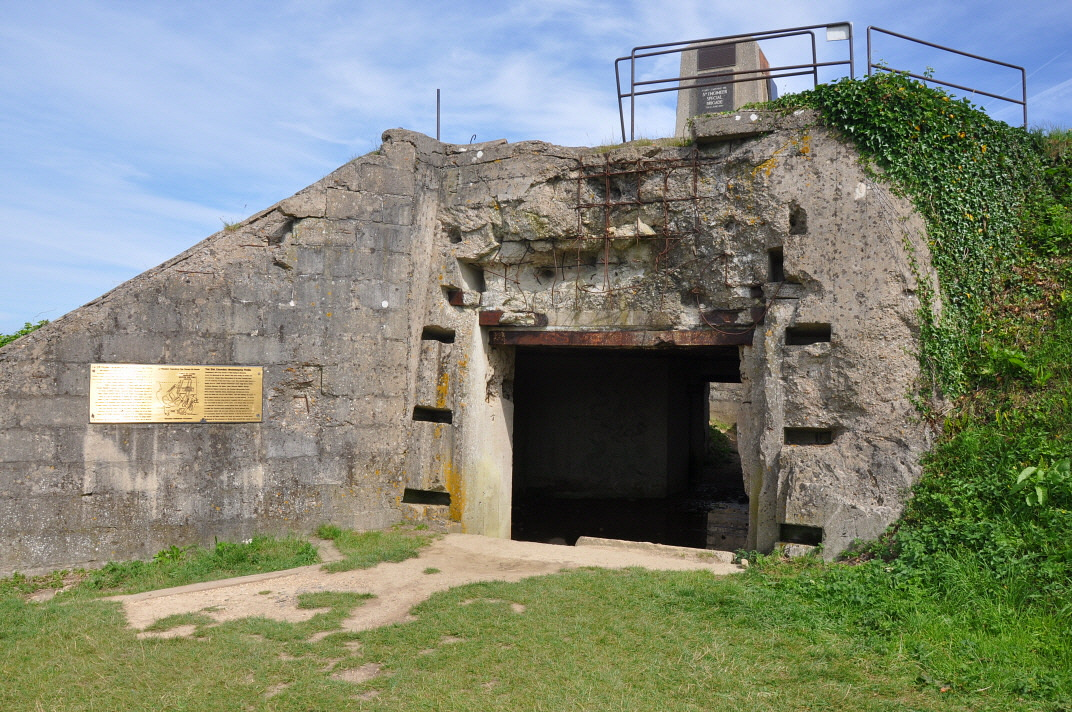
Top Casement of WN-62, with the memorial honoring 5th Engineer Brigade

Severloh was first sent as a prisoner of war to Boston, United States. In December 1946, he was transferred to Bedfordshire, England as forced labor working on road construction. Severloh was returned to Germany in March 1947 after his father wrote to the British military authorities saying he was needed to work back on the farm.

== Later life and death ==
In the 1960s, an American military chaplain, David Silva, who had been wounded by three bullets in the chest on Omaha Beach, was contacted by Severloh, who had found his name in the Cornelius Ryan book The Longest Day. They later met several times, including at the 2005 reunion of Allied Forces in Normandy. On 5 June 2004 RTL showed a two-hour documentary in co-production with CBC Radio: "Mortal enemies of Omaha Beach, the story of an unusual friendship," by Alexander Czogalla.

Severloh died on 14 January 2006 in Lachendorf, near his home village of Metzingen, aged 82.

== The historical taking of WN 62 ==
By 07:35, on 6 June 1944, the third battalion of the 726th Grenadier Regiment, defending Draw F-1 on Fox Green beach, was reporting that 100–200 American troops had penetrated the front, with troops inside the wire at WN-62 and attacking from the rear.

At 08:25, elements of Company G, 16th Infantry Regiment, 1st US Infantry Division, breached the WN 62 strongpoint. Advancing under cover of the shore bombardment, small groups infiltrated the German position by moving through dead ground and flanking the trenches to the rear of the bunkers. Leading this assault was Technical sergeant Philip Streczyk, whose group cleared a route through barbed wire and mines. Streczyk was awarded the Distinguished Service Cross for this charge.

The collapse of WN 62 occurred soon after, and the remaining defenders were overrun and killed. The position was secured by Company G, supported by engineers who followed through the breach.

== Widerstandsnest 62 today ==
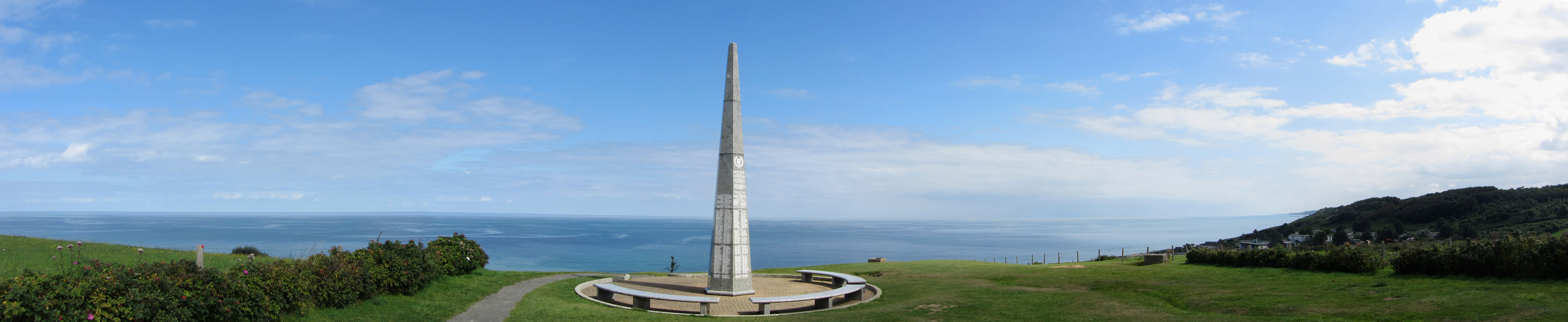
The Lower Casement of WN-62, with the Monument to the 1st Infantry Division

The remains of Resistance Point 62 lie just east of the American Normandy American Cemetery and Memorial and close to the viewing platform. On the top of one of the casemates is a monument to honor the 5th Engineer Brigade and further toward the beach is the needle honoring the 1st Infantry Division(The Big Red One).

== Gallery ==
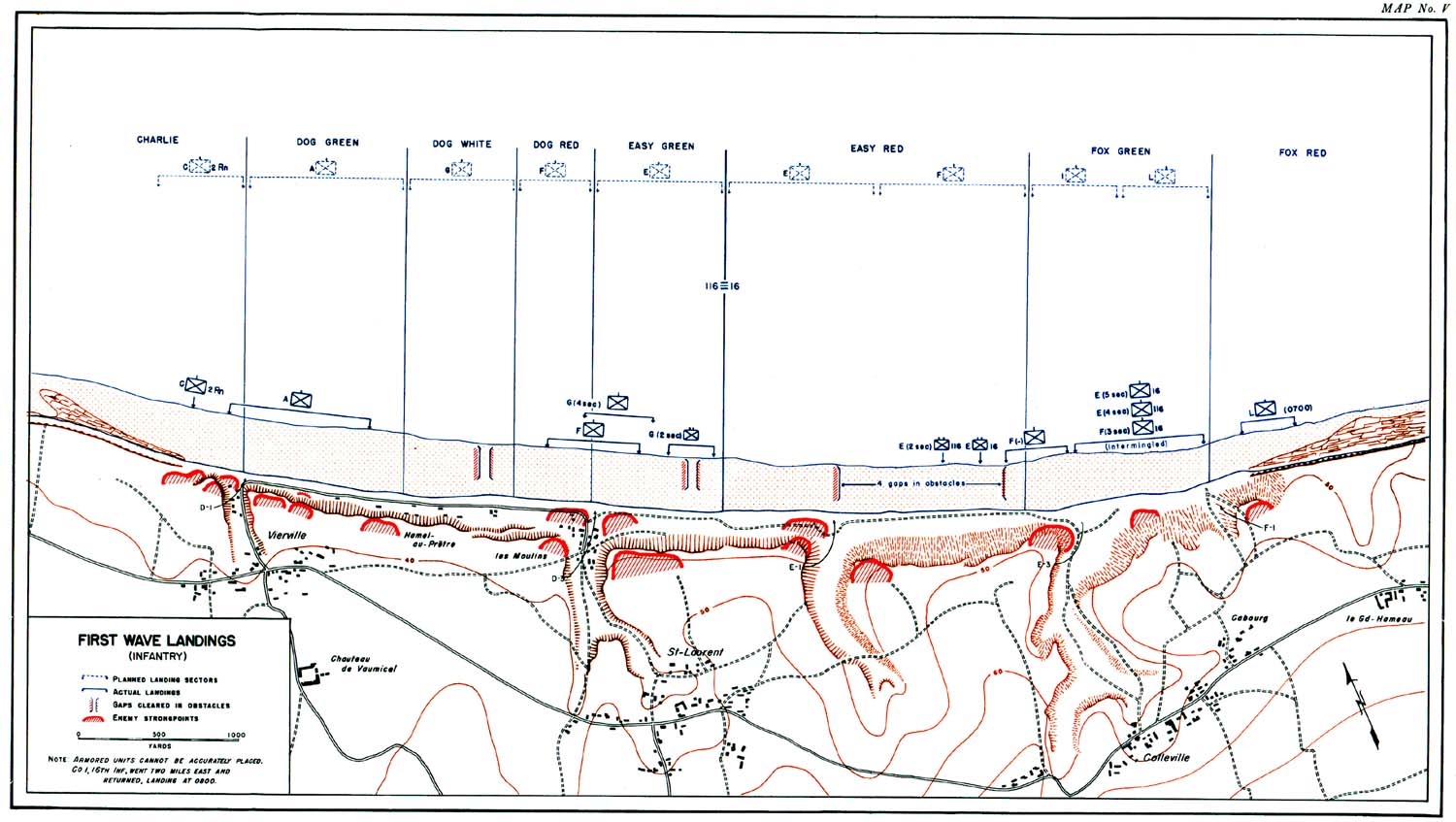
Omaha Beachhead
Initial Assault Map

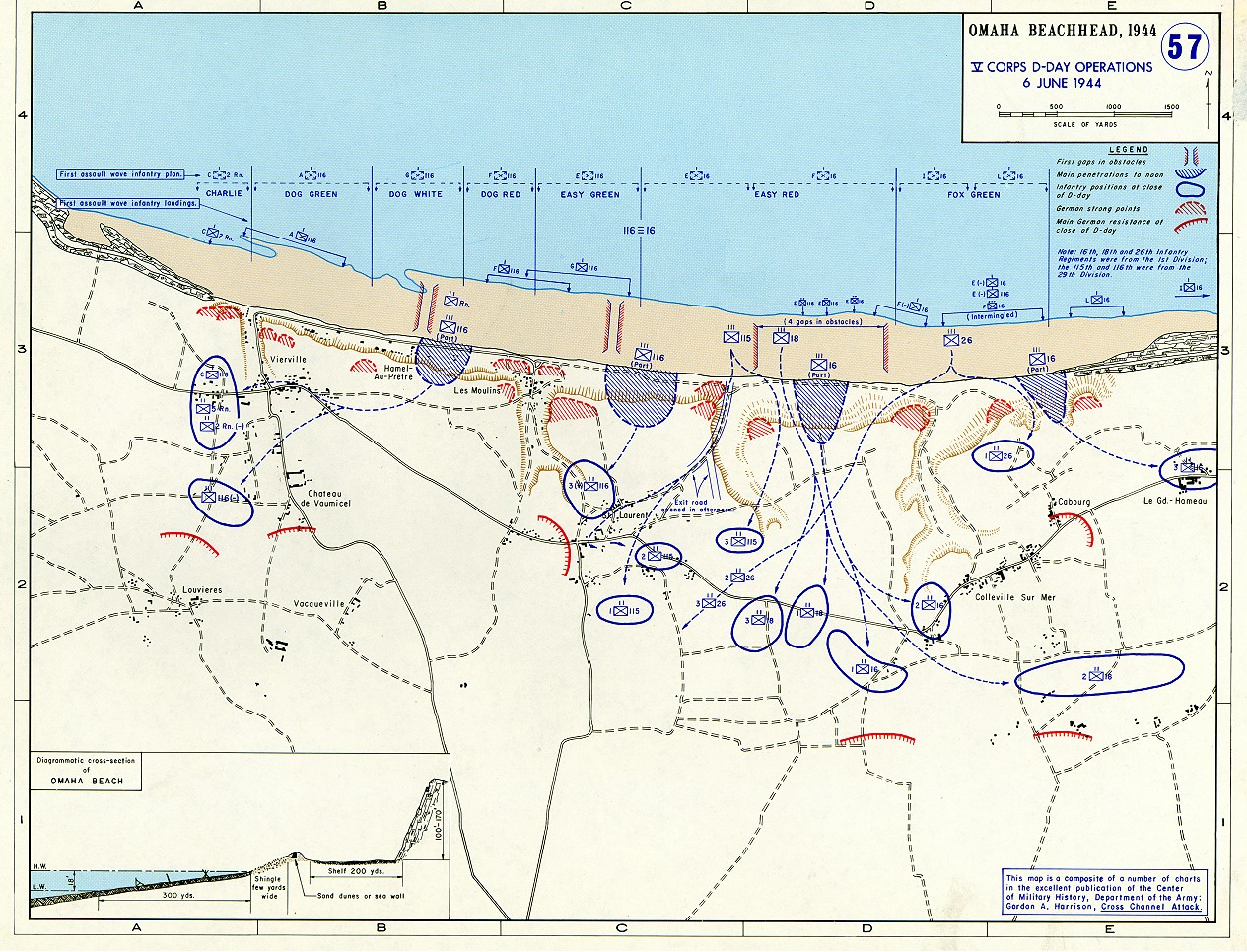
Omaha Beachhead
D-Day Operations Map

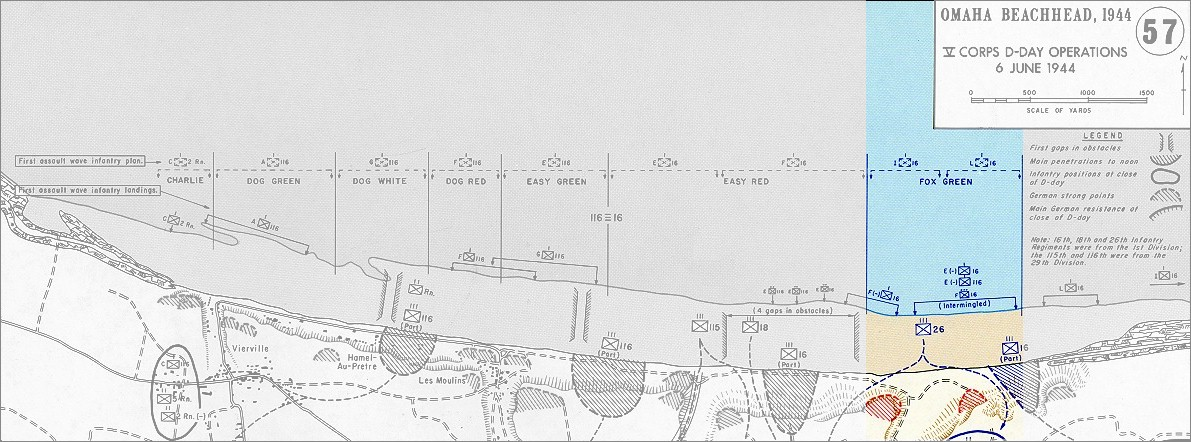
Omaha Beachhead
Fox Green Objectives - WN62

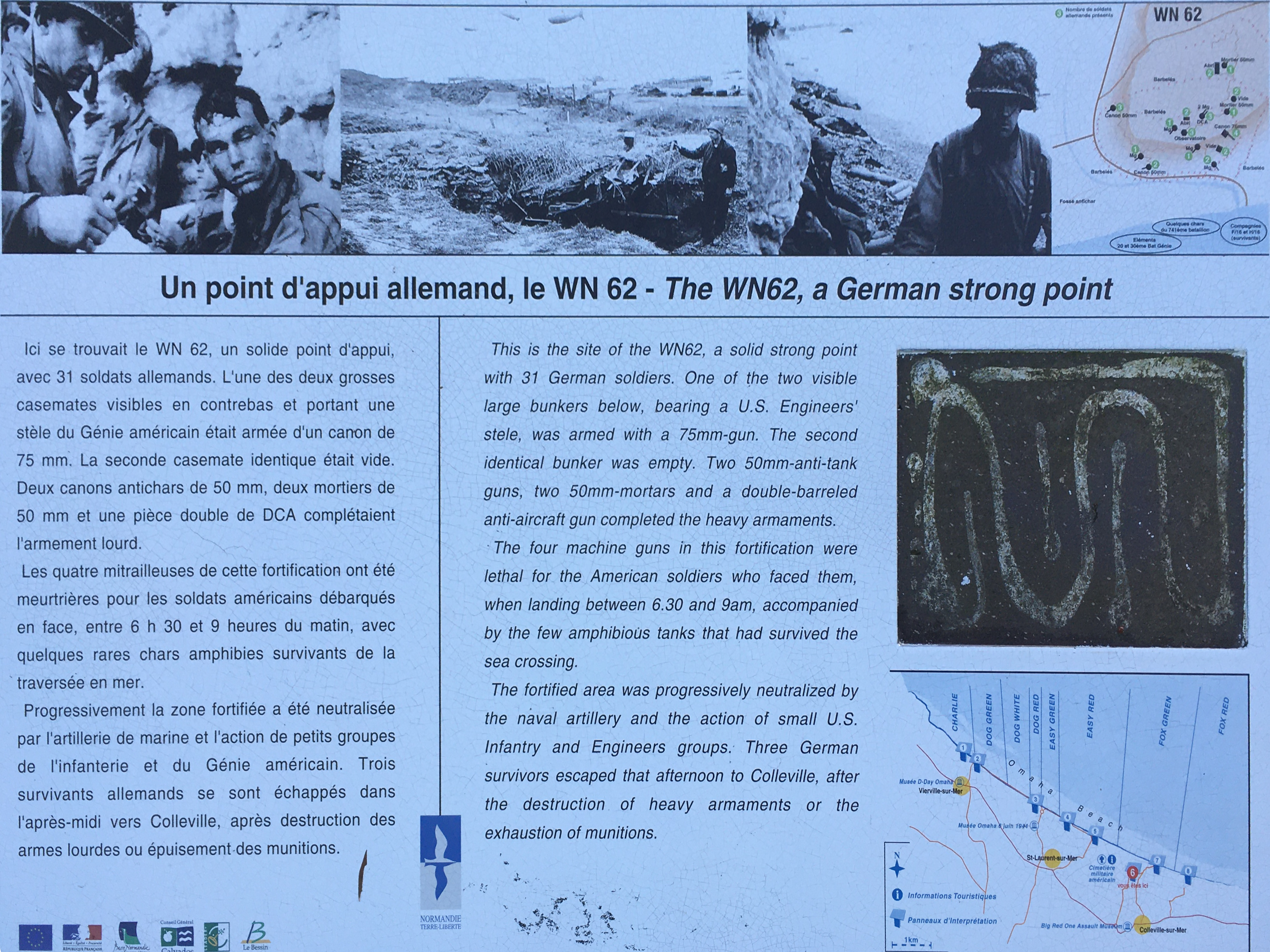
Wn62 Information Panel
Colleville-sur-Mer

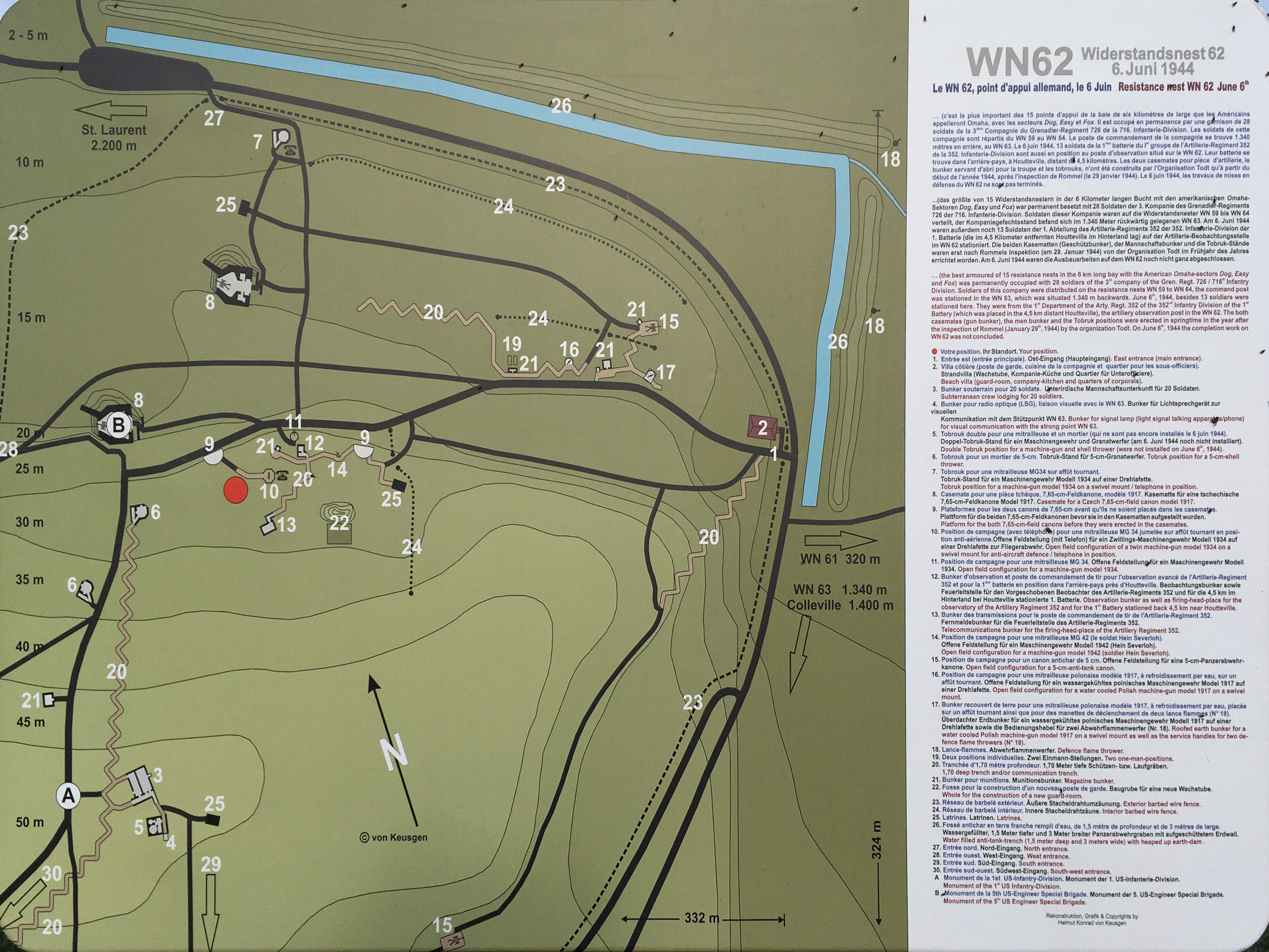
Wn62 Information Panel
Colleville-sur-Mer (alt)

== Bibliography ==
- Severloh, Heinrich (2006). WN 62: A German Soldier's Memories of the Defence of Omaha Beach, Normandy, June 6, 1944 (English Language). Hek Creativ Verlag. ISBN 978-3932922237.
- Severloh, Heinrich (2004). WN-62 – Erinnerungen an Omaha Beach Normandie, 6. Juni 1944 (German Language). Hek Creativ Verlag. ISBN 978-3-932922-11-4. OCLC 56831668.
- George Bernage: Omaha – 6. Juni 1944, Editions Heimdal, France (August 2002), ISBN 978-2-84048-154-6
