= Flotwedel =

- Samtgemeinde
- Location of Flotwedel within Celle district
- Interactive map of Flotwedel
- Location within Germany Location within Lower Saxony
- Coordinates: 52°35′N 10°11′E
- Country: Germany
- State: Lower Saxony
- District: Celle
- Seat: Wienhausen
- Subdivisions: 4 municipalities

Area
  - Total: 113.35 km^{2} (43.76 sq mi)

Population (2025-12-31)
  - Total: 11,267
  - Density: 99.400/km^{2} (257.45/sq mi)
- Time zone: UTC+01:00 (CET)
  - Summer (DST): UTC+02:00 (CEST)
- Website: www.flotwedel.de

Flotwedel is a Samtgemeinde ("collective municipality") in the district of Celle, in Lower Saxony, Germany. It is situated on the river Aller, approx. 10 km southeast of Celle. Its seat is in Wienhausen.

The Samtgemeinde Flotwedel consists of the following municipalities:

1. Bröckel
2. Eicklingen
3. Langlingen
4. Wienhausen
