= Thören =

- Ortschaft of Winsen (Aller)
- Interactive map of Thören
- Location within Germany Location within Lower Saxony
- Coordinates: 52°40′39″N 9°45′22″E
- Country: Germany
- State: Lower Saxony
- District: Celle
- Municipality: Winsen (Aller)
- Elevation: 30 m (98 ft)

Population
  - Total: 670
- Time zone: UTC+01:00 (CET)
  - Summer (DST): UTC+02:00 (CEST)
- Postal codes: 29308
- Dialling codes: 05146

Thören is a village on the southern edge of the Lüneburg Heath in the north German state of Lower Saxony. It is located in the Aller-Leine Valley and is an Ortschaft (municipal division) of the municipality of Winsen (Aller).

== History ==
In 1662 a school was established in Thören, In 1667, according to a preserved Amt register it had 4 farmsteads (Vollhöfe), 2 smallholdings (Halbhöfe), 7 farmers (Bauern), 2 cottagers (Kötner) and a tithe barn. In 1900 there were 161 inhabitants in the village and in 1921 Thören had 174. By 1946 the population had grown to 445 and today there are about 670. In 1966 the school was closed; after a time it was converted, together with the teacher's residence, into the Brase Inn, after the neighbouring inn of Voigt (formerly the post office) had been closed previously. In 1972 Thören was incorporated into Winsen (Aller).

== Clubs ==
Thören's Schützenverein was founded in 1909 and its volunteer fire service in 1934. In 1975 the local interest group was formed. There is also a football club, hunting fraternity, bowling club and a riding and driving club.
