= Eicklingen =

- Municipality
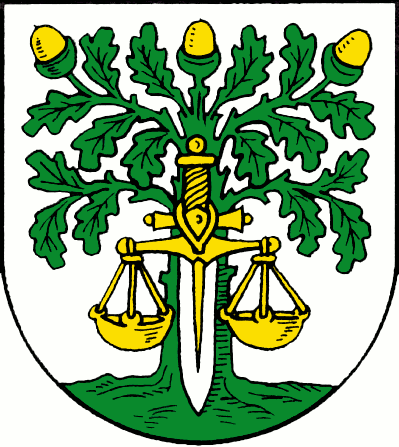
- Coat of arms

- Location of Eicklingen within Celle district
- Interactive map of Eicklingen
- Location within Germany Location within Lower Saxony
- Coordinates: 52°33′N 10°11′E
- Country: Germany
- State: Lower Saxony
- District: Celle
- Municipal assoc.: Flotwedel

Government
  - Mayor: Jörn Schepelmann (CDU)

Area
  - Total: 22.89 km^{2} (8.84 sq mi)
- Elevation: 43 m (141 ft)

Population (2025-12-31)
  - Total: 3,157
  - Density: 137.9/km^{2} (357.2/sq mi)
- Time zone: UTC+01:00 (CET)
  - Summer (DST): UTC+02:00 (CEST)
- Postal codes: 29358
- Dialling codes: 05144, 05149
- Vehicle registration: CE

Eicklingen (German pronunciation: [ˈaɪklɪŋən]) is a municipality in the district of Celle, in Lower Saxony, Germany.
