= Langlingen =

- Municipality
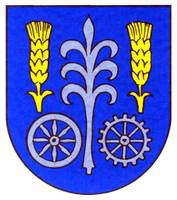
- Coat of arms

- Location of Langlingen within Celle district
- Interactive map of Langlingen
- Location within Germany Location within Lower Saxony
- Coordinates: 52°33′N 10°17′E
- Country: Germany
- State: Lower Saxony
- District: Celle
- Municipal assoc.: Flotwedel
- Subdivisions: 6 Ortsteile

Government
  - Mayor: Ernst Ingolf Angermann (CDU)

Area
  - Total: 33.57 km^{2} (12.96 sq mi)
- Elevation: 45 m (148 ft)

Population (2025-12-31)
  - Total: 2,145
  - Density: 63.90/km^{2} (165.5/sq mi)
- Time zone: UTC+01:00 (CET)
  - Summer (DST): UTC+02:00 (CEST)
- Postal codes: 29364
- Dialling codes: 05082
- Vehicle registration: CE
- Website: www.langlingen.de

Langlingen (German pronunciation: [ˈlaŋlɪŋən]; Low German: Langeln) is a municipality in the district of Celle, in Lower Saxony, Germany.
