= Jörn Schepelmann =

German politician (born 1986)

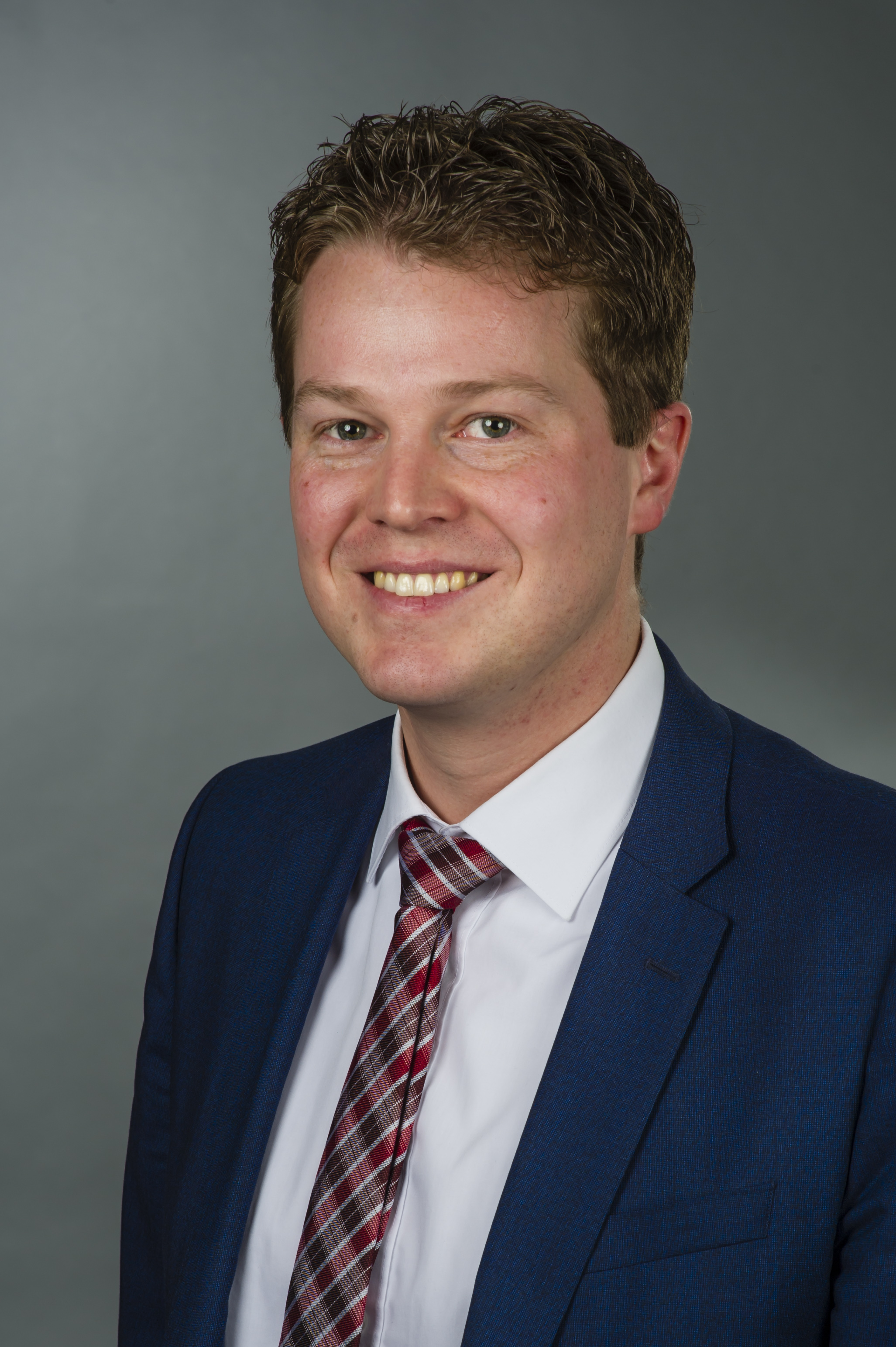
- Schepelmann in 2018

Member of the Landtag of Lower Saxony
- Incumbent
- Assumed office 14 November 2017
- Preceded by: Ernst-Ingolf Angermann
- Constituency: Bergen

Personal details
- Born: 7 April 1986 (age 40) Celle
- Party: Christian Democratic Union (since 2009)

Jörn Schepelmann (born 7 April 1986 in Celle) is a German politician serving as a member of the Landtag of Lower Saxony since 2017. He has served as mayor of Eicklingen since 2016.
