= Eldingen =

- Municipality
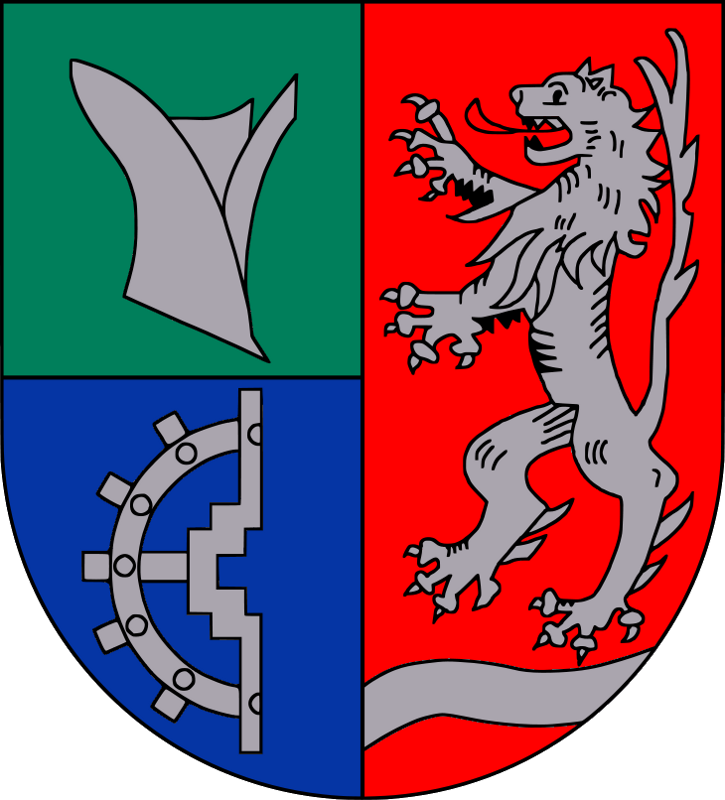
- Coat of arms

- Location of Eldingen within Celle district
- Interactive map of Eldingen
- Location within Germany Location within Lower Saxony
- Coordinates: 52°41′05″N 10°20′40″E
- Country: Germany
- State: Lower Saxony
- District: Celle
- Municipal assoc.: Lachendorf

Government
  - Mayor: Hans-Joachim Lübbe

Area
  - Total: 57.04 km^{2} (22.02 sq mi)
- Elevation: 71 m (233 ft)

Population (2025-12-31)
  - Total: 1,968
  - Density: 34.50/km^{2} (89.36/sq mi)
- Time zone: UTC+01:00 (CET)
  - Summer (DST): UTC+02:00 (CEST)
- Postal codes: 29351
- Dialling codes: 05148
- Vehicle registration: CE
- Website: www.lachendorf.de

Eldingen (German pronunciation: [ˈɛldɪŋən]) is a municipality in the district of Celle, in Lower Saxony, Germany.

== History ==
The first mention of Eldingen occurs in a document, affixed with seal, from the year 1231. It confirms the purchase of the Eldingen (Elthinge) church by a neighboring convent.

The village became Protestant in 1543. As the seat of the Herren von Elding—with several free manors and a church—it survived the 30 Years War.

== Notable people ==
- Heinrich Severloh (1923-2006) German machine gunner during WW2 in the 352nd Infantry Division, famed for being responsible for over 1,000 and possibly over 2,000 casualties to the American soldiers landing on Omaha Beach on D-Day.
