= Lachendorf (Samtgemeinde) =

- Samtgemeinde
- Location of Lachendorf within Celle district
- Interactive map of Lachendorf
- Location within Germany Location within Lower Saxony
- Coordinates: 52°37′N 10°15′E
- Country: Germany
- State: Lower Saxony
- District: Celle
- Seat: Lachendorf
- Subdivisions: 5 municipalities

Area
  - Total: 165.4 km^{2} (63.9 sq mi)

Population (2025-12-31)
  - Total: 12,226
  - Density: 73.92/km^{2} (191.4/sq mi)
- Time zone: UTC+01:00 (CET)
  - Summer (DST): UTC+02:00 (CEST)
- Website: www.lachendorf.de

Lachendorf is a Samtgemeinde ("collective municipality") in the district of Celle, in Lower Saxony, Germany. Its seat is in Lachendorf.

The Samtgemeinde Lachendorf consists of the following municipalities:

1. Ahnsbeck
2. Beedenbostel
3. Eldingen
4. Hohne
5. Lachendorf
