= Lachendorf =

- Municipality
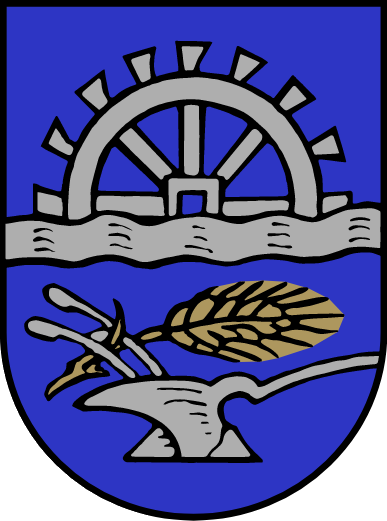
- Coat of arms

- Location of Lachendorf within Celle district
- Interactive map of Lachendorf
- Location within Germany Location within Lower Saxony
- Coordinates: 52°37′N 10°15′E
- Country: Germany
- State: Lower Saxony
- District: Celle
- Municipal assoc.: Lachendorf
- Subdivisions: 4 districts

Government
  - Mayor: Hartmut Ostermann (CDU)

Area
  - Total: 38.43 km^{2} (14.84 sq mi)
- Elevation: 49 m (161 ft)

Population (2025-12-31)
  - Total: 5,958
  - Density: 155.0/km^{2} (401.5/sq mi)
- Time zone: UTC+01:00 (CET)
  - Summer (DST): UTC+02:00 (CEST)
- Postal codes: 29331
- Dialling codes: 05145
- Vehicle registration: CE
- Website: www.lachendorf.de

Lachendorf (German pronunciation: [ˈlaxn̩dɔʁf]; West Low German: Lachendörp) is a municipality in the district of Celle, in Lower Saxony, Germany. It is situated approximately 10 km east of Celle.

Lachendorf is also the seat of the Samtgemeinde ("collective municipality") Lachendorf.

== History ==
In older records Lachendorf is mentioned under the name of Lachtendorp, meaning village at the river Lachte. In 1538 Ernest I, Duke of Brunswick-Lüneburg chose it as a proper place for a paper mill, which marks the beginning of settlement and commercial development. In 1845 the paper mill was extended to a factory, creating a remarkable amount of workspace in this agricultural region.

== Famous residents ==
- Wilhelm Trumann, great-great grandfather of the 33rd president of the USA Harry S. Truman
- Heinrich Severloh (1923–2006), platoon of the Wehrmacht and rifleman on Omaha Beach
- Konstantin Rausch (born 1990), football/soccer player for Hannover 96

== International relations ==
=== Twin towns – Sister cities ===
Lachendorf is twinned with:

- Bricquebec, Manche, Normandy, France
