= Theodor Lohmann =

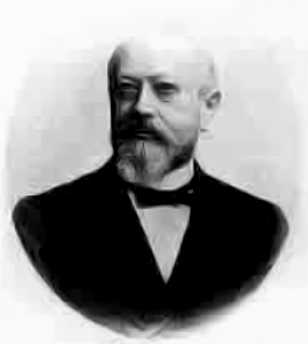
Theodor Christian Lohmann

Theodor Christian Lohmann (October 18, 1831 – August 31, 1905) was a 19th-century German administrative lawyer, civil servant and social reformer, second in importance only to Otto von Bismarck in the formation of the German social insurance system. He is considered one of the major forces advocating for legislation for occupational safety and health, as co-architect of Bismarck's social security and as a seminal figure in the relation of Diakonie and social politics.

== Private life, education, and early career ==
Theodor Lohmann was the seventh of eight children in a rural, patriarchal Lutheran household. From early on Lohmann had been influenced by the pious German Lutheran Great Awakening movement of Ludwig Harms, characterized by proselytism and sanctification. Lohmann's father, Ernst Heinrich Lohmann (1797–1856), was a merchant and owner of a brickyard. His mother, Johanna Juliana Lohmann (born Hardegen), died early. Theodor Lohmann attended the gymnasium in Celle.

From 1850 he studied jurisprudence and political science at the University of Göttingen, where he also engaged in the study of church theory and came in contact with the Inner Mission for the first time, which led him to write his first thesis Communismus, Socialismus, Christenthum. His thesis received a great deal of academic attention for its proposal of an extensive reform of society in the light of the newly emerging socialist theories. In 1851 he was one of the founders of the Burschenschaft Germania of Göttingen. Four years later Lohmann entered the civil service of the Kingdom of Hanover. In 1858 he passed the second Staatsexamen.

Subsequently, Lohmann was active in different roles for the royal administration of Hanover. In 1861 he was assigned to the administration's cultural department, and as general secretary in 1869 Lohmann participated in the first Evangelisch-Lutheran synod in Hanover. In the 1860s he had already engaged himself with the development of the Lutheran Inner Mission (Innere Mission), effectively reorganizing the constitution of the Hanover state church. Together with the theologian Gerhard Uhlhorn and others he played an important role in the establishment of the Evangelischer Verein ("Evangelisch Association") and the Stephansstift, a diaconal institution of Hanover created in 1869 for the promotion of religious freedom. He was also involved in the assistance of youth and old people as well as vocational training. In 1862 Theodor Lohmann had married Louise Sophie Elisabeth Wyneken (1839–1879). The couple had three children.

== Work as a social reformer ==
During the Austro-Prussian War the Kingdom of Hanover was occupied in 1866 by Prussian troops, and Hanover became a Prussian province. For the administrative lawyer Theodor Lohmann this presented a major fork in his career path: In 1871 Lohmann and his young family moved to Berlin and he assumed a position in the Prussian Ministry of Commerce, where he worked on matters concerning industrial workers. In this capacity he participated in the drafting of a number of bills, including the amendment of the German Trade, Commerce and Industry Regulation Act, which introduced factory inspection in Prussia, and formed the basis for the current-day Gewerbeaufsicht ("industrial, commercial and business inspectorate").

From 1866 to 1873 Hermann Wagener, journalist, Conservative, Prussian and Reichstag deputy, and friend of Bismarck was an official in the Prussian Ministry of State, and an important voice for reform. According to Hennock, Lohmann's role in the period after Wagener's departure is under reassessment by historians:

Wagener’s departure from the political scene in 1873 coincided with the arrival of Theodor Lohmann at the Prussian trade ministry as well as with the tensions caused by the Gründerkrise. Henceforth Lohmann was the most important innovator until in 1880 he was joined by (Chancellor Otto von Bismarck ) himself. That is well known. But the picture of Lohmann’s actions that emerges from (work published in the 1990s and subsequently) has led to a significant re-evaluation of (Lohmann's) role.

In 1880 Lohmann transferred to the Prussian Ministry of Interior. There he played a key staff role in support of Chancellor Otto von Bismarck during the passage of legislation that established the German social security system, the first system in the world based on principles of social insurance. Lohmann's objectives, however, were distinct from Bismarck's: Whereas the famous chancellor was interested in creating a social insurance that transformed the workers into dependent "state pensioners", or quiescent supporters of the Reich, Lohmann sought to broaden the workers' rights of self-determination and local self-governance. Bismarck's concept of state socialism built upon a close linkage of the workers to the state contradicted Lohmann's vision of the mündiger Arbeitnehmer ("mature and responsible worker"). While Bismarck sought to use the social insurance program to firm up the old order of the Prussian Junkers, Lohmann's German brand of Christian socialism sought the middle ground between the Junkers and the other defenders of the old order and the increasingly revolutionary ardor of the German workers.

Those on Bismarck's side were not notably long on ideas about how to deal with what was widely known at the time as the Social Problem. "Nothing illustrates the (Bismarck) government's lack of energy and imagination more strikingly than its approach to the working class," according to Gordon Craig. After the departure of his friend Wagener, the politically artful Bismarck seems to have turned to Lohmann and his associates in the bureaucracy for ideas.

In the Prussian Ministry of Commerce there was a dedicated group of civil servants, led by Freiherr Berlepsch and his chief assistant Theodor Lohmann, who were convinced that the time had come to advance beyond the limits of Bismarck's social welfare system, to provide the working class with a comprehensive code for the protection of the rights of labor, to encourage working class participation in communal activities, and, by doing so, to satisfy its justifiable desire for equality and recognition.

In the end, however, the hopes of the reformers were simply not tolerable to Bismarck and his allies. Craig also writes:

The prevailing philosophy was that preached most stridently by the industrialist Stumm-Halberg, who believed that any kind of working-class organization was a threat to the existing social and political system, and most apocalyptically by soldiers like Waldersee, who regarded military action as the best answer to the rise of socialism.

For the Emperor, the attempt to apply Bismarck's (and Stumm-Halberg's) approach to the social problem, resulted in movement away from initial sympathy for the reform position toward an escalating rhetoric of violence that alarmed many of his servants, who believed his comments were undermining the stability of government. In the end, this approach proved self-defeating and the Reichstag unwilling to be stampeded into adopting anti-socialist legislation. The "net effect was to embitter the working class and to deepen the gulf that existed between it and the rest of German society since 1878. This was unfortunate, since there were forces at work within the working class that might, if properly appreciated, have led to the kind of reconciliation that men like Naumann and Lohmann and Berlepsch were working for."

(Lohmann's) ideas, which were shared, with some modifications, by social reform groups within the Centre Party, by Friedrich Naumann's National-Social Association, by the Evangelical Workers' Union in Mönchengladbach, and by the so-called 'Socialists of the Chair' who belonged to the Social Policy Association found little sympathy at the center of government; and after the Emperor's brief flirtation with them in the first years of his reign, their proponents were gradually eased out of office.

Before he was finally forced out following a confrontation with Bismarck, Lohmann had at least partial success in designing the state's public health insurance: Workers were allowed to participate in the financing and self-government of the health insurance companies. Despite Bismarck's opposition the traditional role of German ancillary health insurance funds and companies in the program was considerably strengthened. In 1883 the sociopolitical differences brought about a major schism between Lohmann and Bismarck and ended Lohmann's role in reforming social insurance in Germany for seven years. The immediate cause of the rift was disagreement over provisions of accident insurance coverage. While Lohmann favored direct investment of the workers in the planned accident insurance program, Bismarck sought a compulsory insurance system in the form of mutual employer's liability insurance associations, which were to be subsidized by the state. For a while Lohmann tried to thwart Bismarck's plans. In September 1883 the issue came to a head in a confrontation between the two. As a result, Lohmann was removed from any further role in the formulation of this social legislation. Robert Bosse, the Director of the Ministry of the Interior at the time, noted in his memoirs:

In this conflict Lohmann risked his office and his future. Respect for him! It's another question whether he was factually right. I don’t believe so.

The success of the 1884 law on the new accident insurance and the even greater success of the employer's liability insurance associations confirmed this assumption by Bosse and disproved Lohmann's reservations at least partly. Lohmann himself said he was relieved that he no longer had to account for procedures, which he regarded "wrong" and "completely impracticable".

Lohmann left in 1883. Berlepsch held on, but eventually resigned in disgust in 1896. Others of their reform coalition faced similar fates.

As a result of his career in government, Daniel Rodgers, the Princeton historian whose Atlantic Crossings is a touchstone of transatlantic history puts Lohmann in the company of William Beveridge, the major intellectual architect of the postwar British welfare state, the Stockholm economists of the 1930s and Franklin D. Roosevelt's "brain trust" who shaped the New Deal. Rodgers terms Lohmann "framer of Bismarck's initial social insurance proposals."

== Role in church social action ==
After he left the Prussian administration Theodor Lohmann immersed himself in supporting the Inner Mission and traditional missionary work, among other things in the Gesellschaft zur Beförderung des Christentums unter den Juden ("Society for the Advancement of Christianity among the Jews"). He served as the society's president from 1876 to 1898. Lohmann also worked for the Gesellschaft zur Beförderung der evangelischen Missionen unter den Heiden ("Society for the Advancement of the Evangelisch Missions among Unbelievers"). In 1880 Lohmann had become a member of the Central-Ausschuß für die innere Mission der deutschen evangelischen Kirche ("Central Committee for the Inner Mission of the German Evangelisch Church"). He remained its member until his death in 1905.

In 1885 Lohmann wrote the report of the General Committee of the Inner Mission entitled Die Aufgabe der Kirche und inrer inneren Mission gegenüber den wirtschaftlichen und gesellschaftlichen Kämpfen der Gegenwart (The Function of the Church and its Internal Mission in relation to the Present Economic and Social Conflicts). According to Gordon Craig, this volume "anticipated much that was to be said six years later in (Pope) Leo XIII's Rerum novarum, and the outstanding Christian Social reformer of the next generation, Friedrich Naumann.

After Bismarck's departure from his position as German chancellor in 1890 Lohmann was reassigned by the new Minister of Trade, Hans Hermann of Berlepsch, to further extend the German worker legislation. One of his responsibilities during his first year was the planning and execution of the International Conference on Protection of Workers held in Berlin. He was subsequently involved in a further amendment of the German Trade, Commerce and Industry Regulation Act, which brought new improvements for the workers, e.g. the prohibition of nightwork for women and young people. After several promotions Lohmann was appointed director of the trade department in the Ministry of Trade in 1900. In 1904, on the occasion of his fiftieth anniversary of administrative service, he was presented with the Wilhelmsorden, an award for special sociopolitical contributions.

Theodor Lohmann died on August 31, 1905, at the age of seventy-three in Tabartz, Thuringia. Despite his substantial contributions to the German social security system and the protection of German workers, Lohmann and his social reforms remain to this day in the shadow of Bismarck and his politics.
