= Wienhausen =

- Municipality
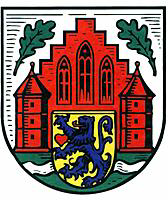
- Coat of arms

- Location of Wienhausen within Celle district
- Interactive map of Wienhausen
- Location within Germany Location within Lower Saxony
- Coordinates: 52°35′N 10°11′E
- Country: Germany
- State: Lower Saxony
- District: Celle
- Municipal assoc.: Flotwedel
- Subdivisions: 4 Ortsteile

Government
  - Mayor: Karl-Heinz Pickel (CDU)

Area
  - Total: 40.55 km^{2} (15.66 sq mi)
- Elevation: 42 m (138 ft)

Population (2025-12-31)
  - Total: 3,956
  - Density: 97.56/km^{2} (252.7/sq mi)
- Time zone: UTC+01:00 (CET)
  - Summer (DST): UTC+02:00 (CEST)
- Postal codes: 29342
- Dialling codes: 05149
- Vehicle registration: CE
- Website: www.wienhausen.de

Wienhausen (German pronunciation: [viːnˈhaʊzn̩]) is a municipality in the district of Celle, in Lower Saxony, Germany. It is known for Wienhausen Abbey, referenced in the municipal coat of arms.
