= Celle (district) =

District in Lower Saxony, Germany

- District
- Flag Coat of arms
- Coordinates: 52°35′N 10°05′E
- Country: Germany
- State: Lower Saxony
- Capital: Celle

Government
  - District admin.: Axel Flader (CDU)

Area
  - Total: 1,554 km^{2} (600 sq mi)

Population (31 December 2022)
  - Total: 181,994
  - Density: 120/km^{2} (300/sq mi)
- Time zone: UTC+01:00 (CET)
  - Summer (DST): UTC+02:00 (CEST)
- Vehicle registration: CE
- Website: landkreis-celle.de

Celle (German pronunciation: [ˈtsɛlə]) is a district (Landkreis) in Lower Saxony, Germany. It is bounded by (from the north and clockwise) the districts of Uelzen, Gifhorn, Hanover and Heidekreis.

== Geography ==
The district is located in the southernmost parts of the Lüneburg Heath (Lüneburger Heide). The Aller River enters the district in the east, runs through the town of Celle and leaves the district in the northwest. It is joined by many tributaries coming from the south.

== Lüneburg Regional Association ==
To look after cultural matters the Lüneburg Regional Association (Lüneburgischer Landschaftsverband) was founded as a registered association (eingetragener Verein).

== Coat of arms ==
The lion and the heart were part of the arms of the Lüneburg, a subdivision of the Duchy of Brunswick-Lüneburg. The Principality was occasionally (but incorrectly) also known as Brunswick-Celle, since Celle was its capital for some time. The only difference is the number of hearts (the original coat of arms included more than one heart).

== Towns and municipalities ==
Clickable map of municipalities in the district

Towns	Collective municipalities (Samtgemeinden)
1. Bergen; 2. Celle; Free municipalities: 1. Eschede; 2. Faßberg; 3. Hambühren; 4. Südheide; 5. Wietze; 6. Winsen; Unincorporated area: 1. Lohheide	1. Flotwedel; 1. Bröckel; 2. Eicklingen; 3. Langlingen; 4. Wienhausen^{1}	2. Lachendorf; 1. Ahnsbeck; 2. Beedenbostel; 3. Eldingen; 4. Hohne; 5. Lachendorf^{1}; 3. Wathlingen; 1. Adelheidsdorf; 2. Nienhagen; 3. Wathlingen^{1}
	^{1}seat of the Samtgemeinde

== Miscellaneous ==
- The town of Bergen is known for its southern quarter of Belsen, where the Nazi concentration camp of Bergen-Belsen was.
- The village of Eschede north of Celle was the site of the Eschede train disaster on June 3, 1998, when an ICE high-speed train derailed and 101 people died.

== See also ==
- Metropolitan region Hannover-Braunschweig-Göttingen-Wolfsburg
