= Oldendorf (Celle district) =

- Ortschaft of Südheide
- Interactive map of Oldendorf
- Location within Germany Location within Lower Saxony
- Coordinates: 52°47′51″N 10°5′17″E
- Country: Germany
- State: Lower Saxony
- District: Celle
- Municipality: Südheide
- Elevation: 52 m (171 ft)

Population
  - Total: 640
- Time zone: UTC+01:00 (CET)
  - Summer (DST): UTC+02:00 (CEST)
- Postal codes: 29320
- Dialling codes: 05052

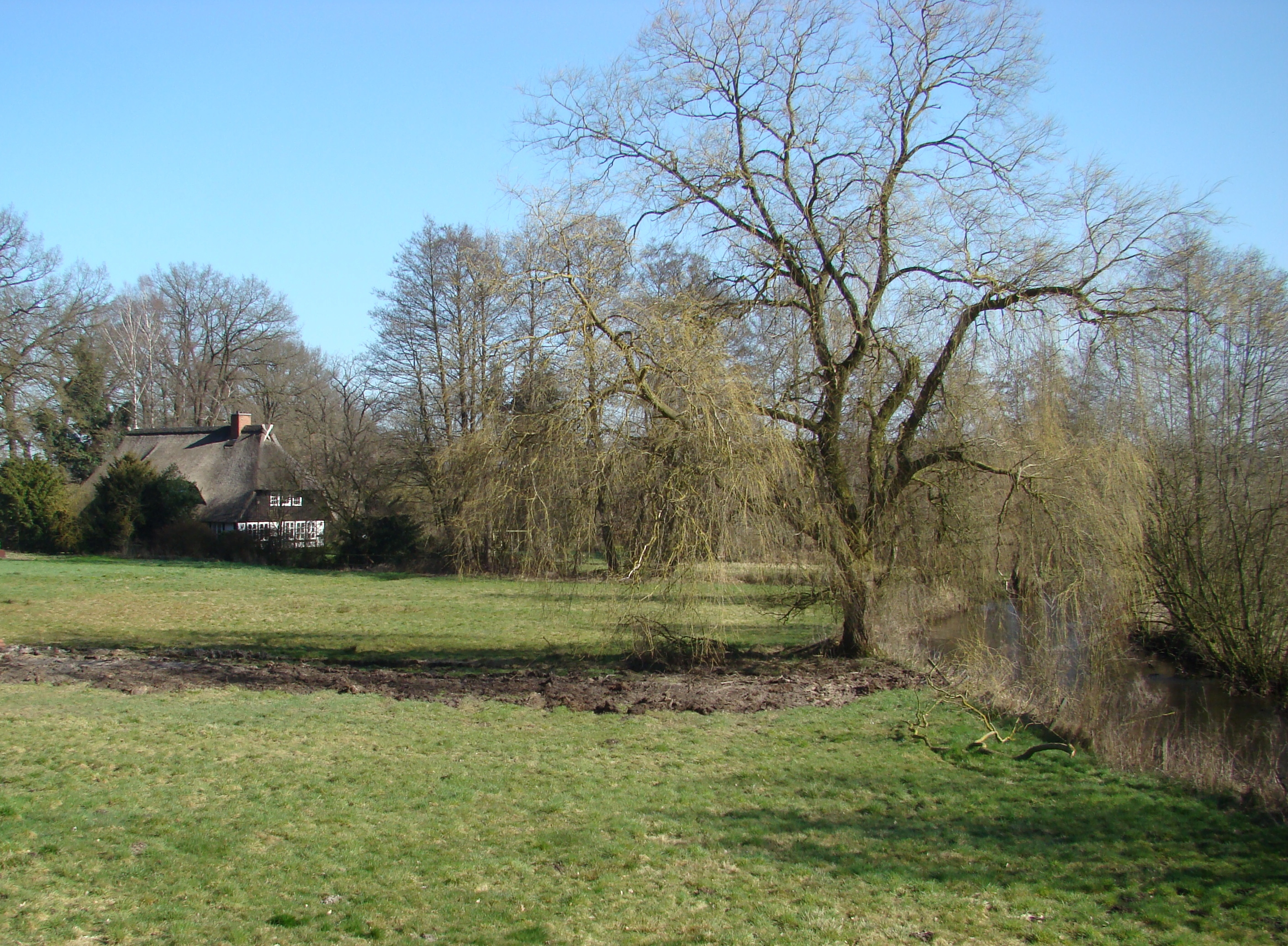
Thatched house on the Örtze in Oldendorf

Oldendorf (German pronunciation: [ˈɔldn̩dɔʁf], meaning: "old village") is a village and Ortschaft in the municipality of Südheide in the northern part of Celle district in Lower Saxony, Germany. It lies on the western edge of the Southern Heath Nature Park, on the Lüneburg Heath, about 2 km south of the main village of Hermannsburg and currently has about 640 inhabitants. In 1973 Oldendorf was incorporated into Hermannsburg as part of the Lower Saxony regional and administrative reforms.

== History ==
From the knapped flints that have been unearthed here, it can be concluded that the area around Oldendorf was settled as early as the Stone Age (8000 to 2000 BC). Oldendorf was first mentioned in the records in a document dating to AD 968 by the Saxon duke, Hermann Billung. At that time, a protective castle was built in Oldendorf, which was razed by the Wends in 959 and finally demolished in 1345.

In 1620 the first school was established in Oldendorf.

On 28 May 1785 a large fire broke out. As the houses of the time had thatched roofs and were built of wood, the fire spread very quickly. Within half an hour a total of 14 buildings fell victim to the blaze.

On 20 April 1820 a second major fire broke out in Oldendorf. Nine farms and all their outbuildings burned down. The character of the village changed significantly as a result.

On 10 August 1975 the largest forest fire in the Federal Republic of Germany broke out between Oldendorf and Eschede. Not until a whole week later, on 17 August 1975, was the fire extinguished.

The River Örtze flows through the town in a north-south direction. The original village lies on the west bank of river. This is where the first three free farms in Oldendorf are supposed to have been.

In the 1960s, a gravel works was built. First, only gravel from the old fish ponds on Schlüpker Weg was extracted, but later the operation was continually expanded towards Eschede. By autumn 2007, large-scale gravel extraction was under way. In 1986 a holiday home development of 32 small houses was established on the site of the first gravel pits to be exploited and subsequently abandoned. 400 houses had initially been planned, but were not approved. The gravel mines created large areas of water (the flooded gravel pits) which after a very short time provided a haven for many, sometimes rare, birds. The great crested grebe, coot and greylag goose breed here. Woodlark, goldeneye, little ringed plover, redwing, marsh harrier, reed bunting, reed warbler, teal, shoveler, pintail, wigeon and tufted duck can all be observed here; on rare occasions, osprey may be seen. Sand martins have created nesting holes in the banks.

Today Oldendorf is dominated by agriculture and tourism.

Places of interest in Oldendorf

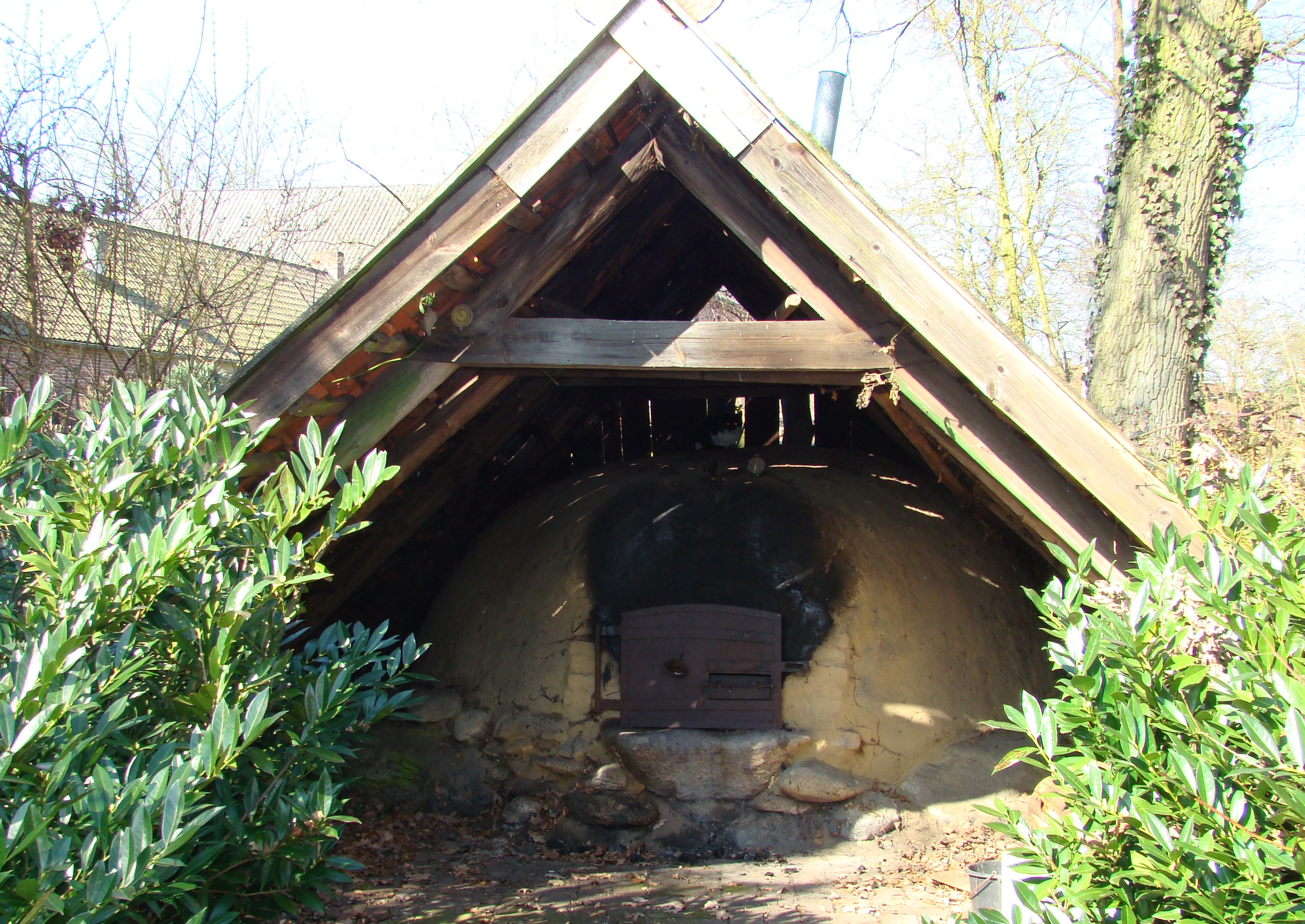
500-year-old baking oven, still in operation

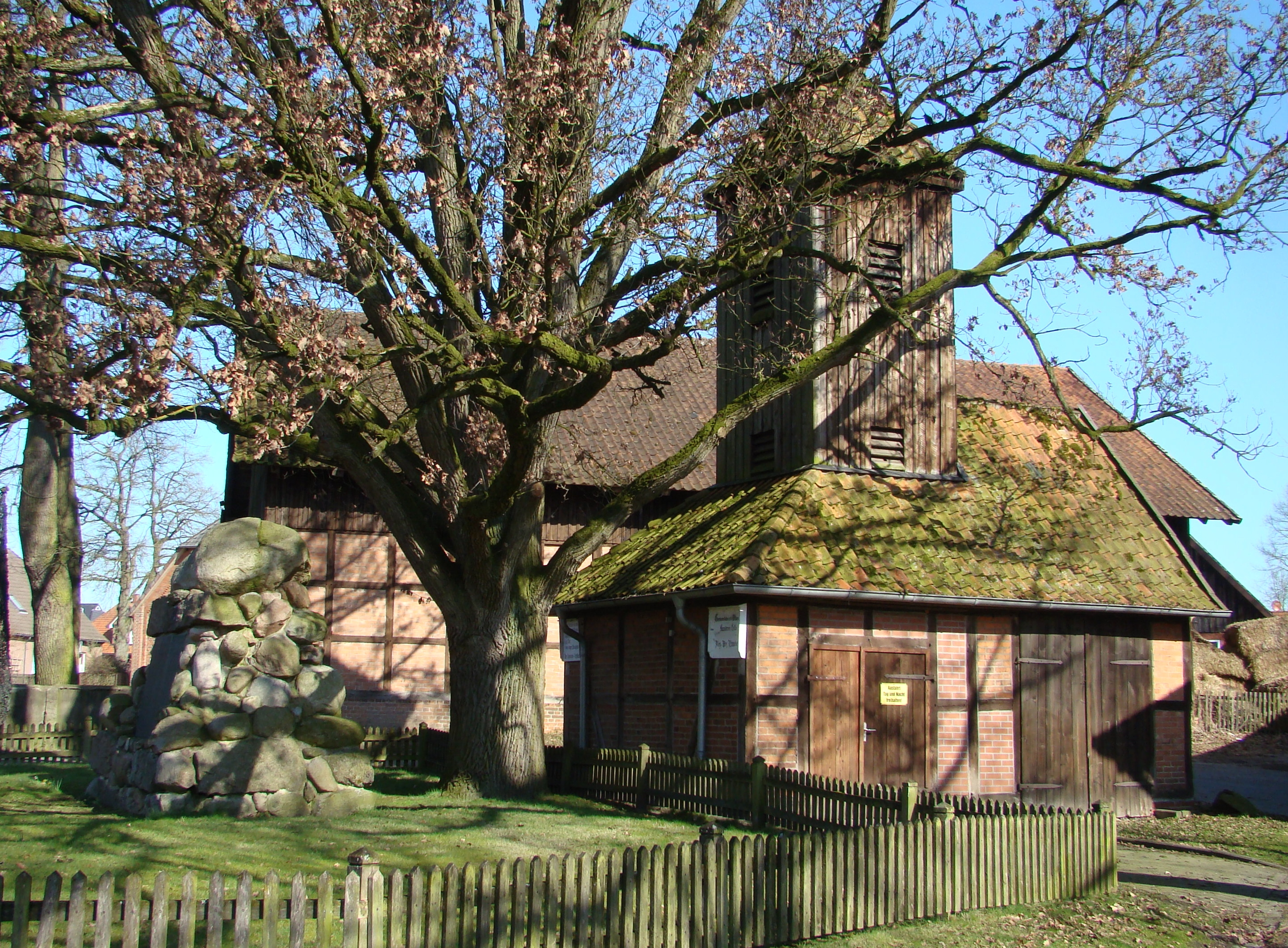
Old fire engine house and war memorial

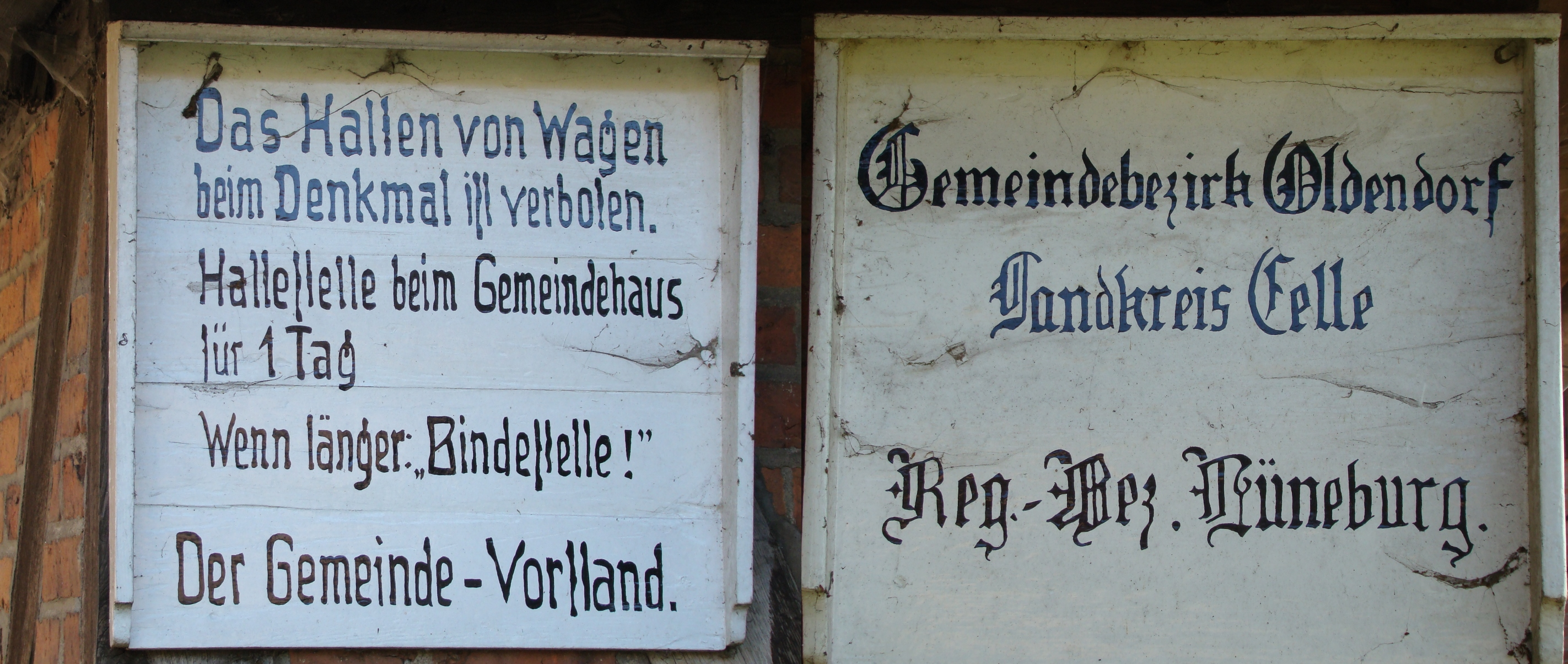
Historic plaques on the fire engine house (Spritzenhaus)

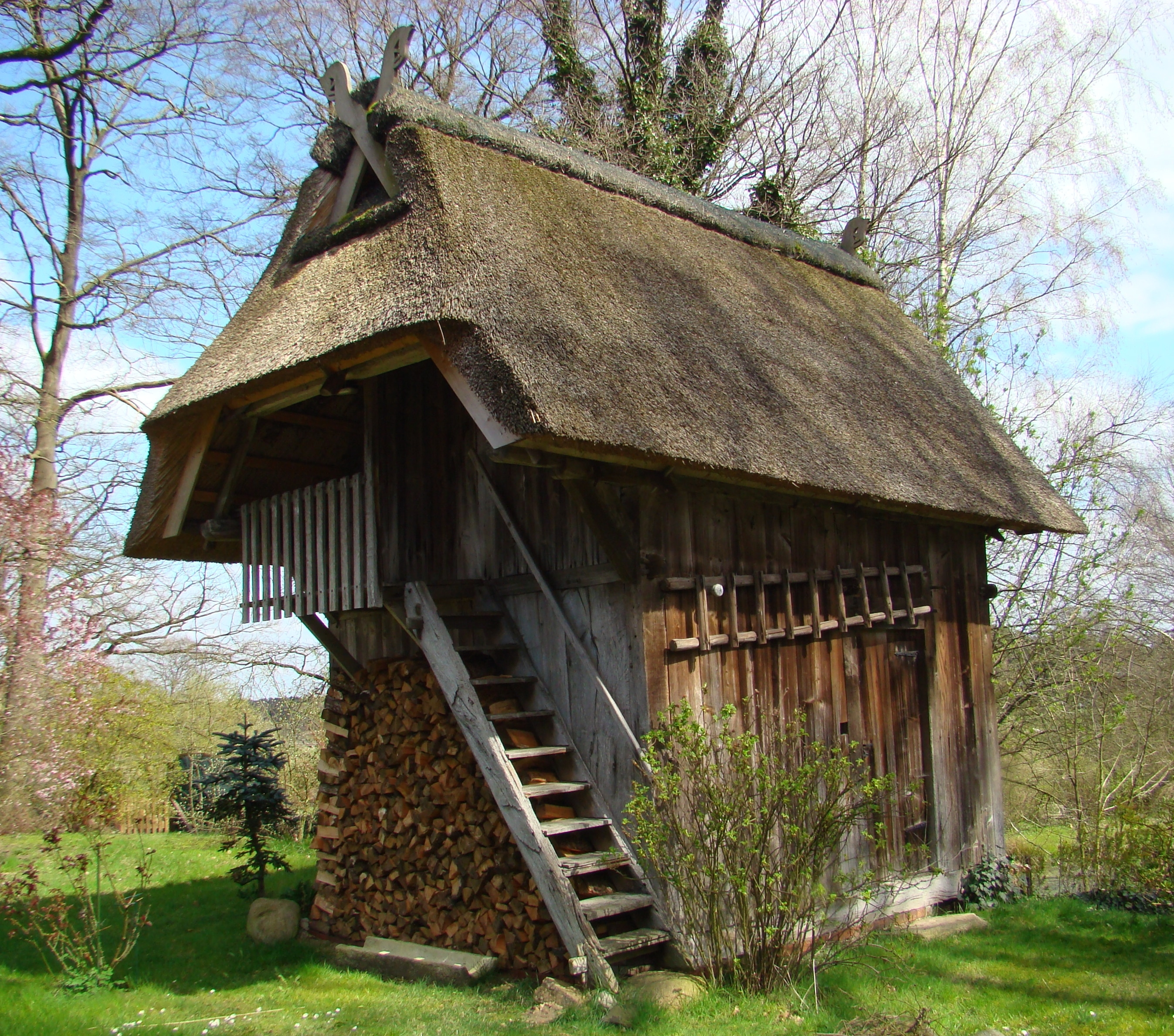
Renovated old Treppenspeicher storage barn

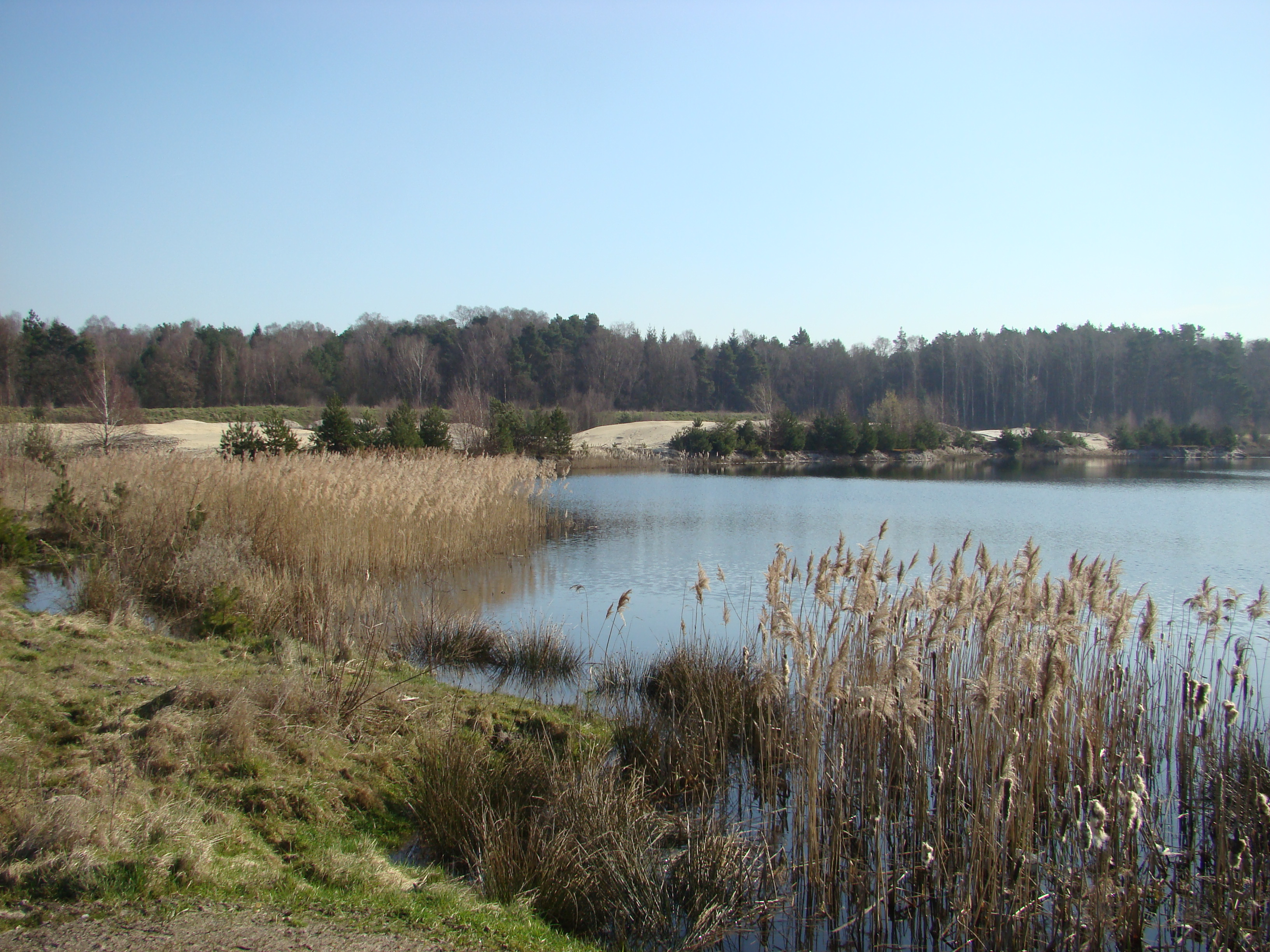
Abandoned gravel pond

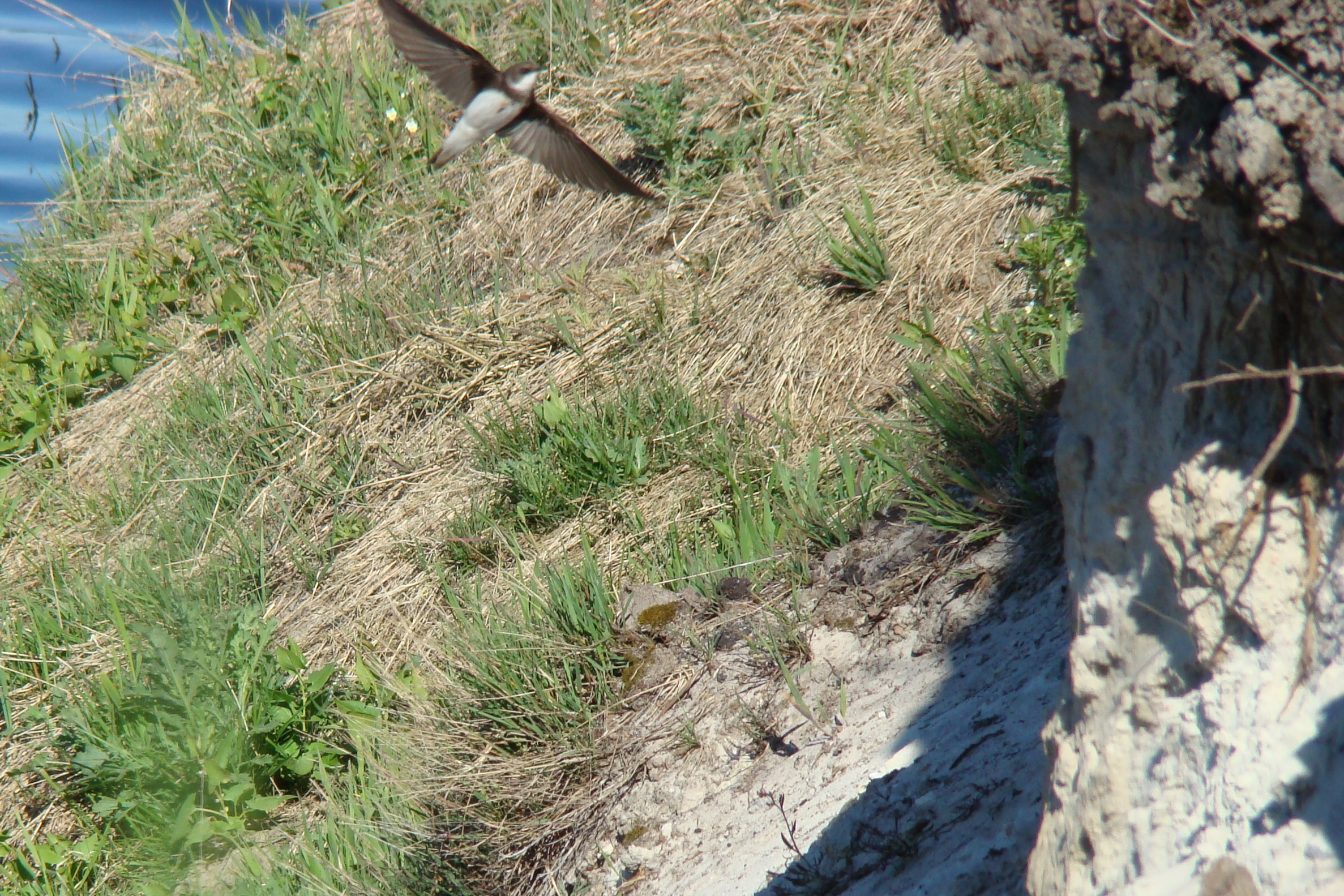
Sand martins in flight by their nest holes

== Oldendorf Manor (Rittergut Oldendorf) ==
400 m north of Oldendorf lies the Oldendorf manor. In 1788 Field Marshal Johann Wilhelm von Reden was given the fief of Hermannsburg-Oldendorf by George III, prince-elector of Hanover and King of England, for his service as a soldier. He secured the field marshal's services particularly during the Seven Years' War (1756 to 1763) during which he was promoted from lieutenant colonel to lieutenant general. Johann Wilhelm von Reden died childless. He had, however, willed the fief during his lifetime to his two nephews, Friedrich Otto and Franz. On 5 November 1840 his heirs divided the fiefdom of Hermannsburg and Oldendorf between them. Each property was then about 500 ha in size. The estate is still owned by the von Redens today.

== Beutzen Farm (Hof Beutzen) ==
The parish of Oldendorf also includes the farmstead of Beutz. It is 1.5 miles south and was once owned by Julius Kothe and his wife, née Hartung. This Kothe family also owned the corn mill in Scharnebeck, where they also lived. Scharnebeck Mill lies to the north halfway between Oldendorf and Hermannsburg, on the Örtze. When the son and heir Traugott Kothe fell in the First World War, his father sold Beutz Farm in 1917 for 440,000 marks to a judge, Wilhelm Meyer, from Hanover. Judge Meyer was head of the Ilsede Ironworks (Ilseder Hütte) and Peine Mills (Peiner Walzwerke). He designated his wife, Anna Meyer, née Glenck, an actress, as the owner. In 1926, a turbine house was built on her premises which produced electricity for her own use from a water-driven turbine until the 1950s. The mill, that had previously been working, was closed.

In 1933, Judge Meyer died and his wife sold the farm to Mr. Bertram, the Director of Hannover-Döhren Wool Washing, for 350,000 marks. In 1945 a children's home was established in the manor house of the farm by the Lobetal Institute, in which children, mainly orphans, of school and pre-school age, some seriously handicapped, were taught. In 1954 the orphanage closed in Beutz and moved to Stübeckshorn. On 1 October 2007 the St. Paul Academy (ASP) rented the former manor house. Chairman of the Beutz Farm board of trustees (Johanneshaus Beutzen) is Prof. Dr. Paul Imhoff, who is also director of the ASP. The academy has since given the building up and it is now a spa house (Kurhaus).

In the immediate vicinity of the farm is the Bornrieth Moor nature reserve. Part of this moor also belongs to the farm.

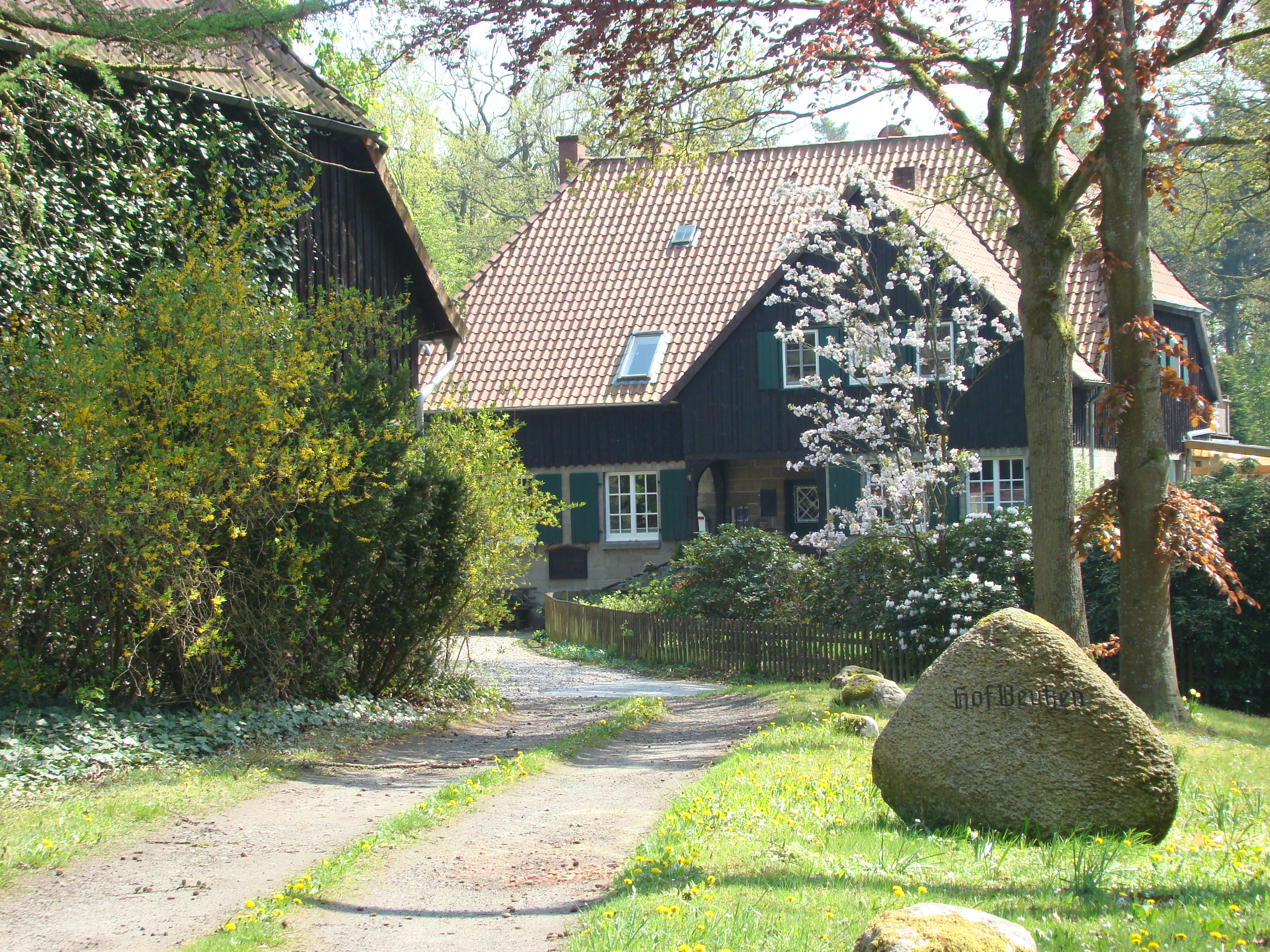
The old bailiff house (Verwalterhaus)

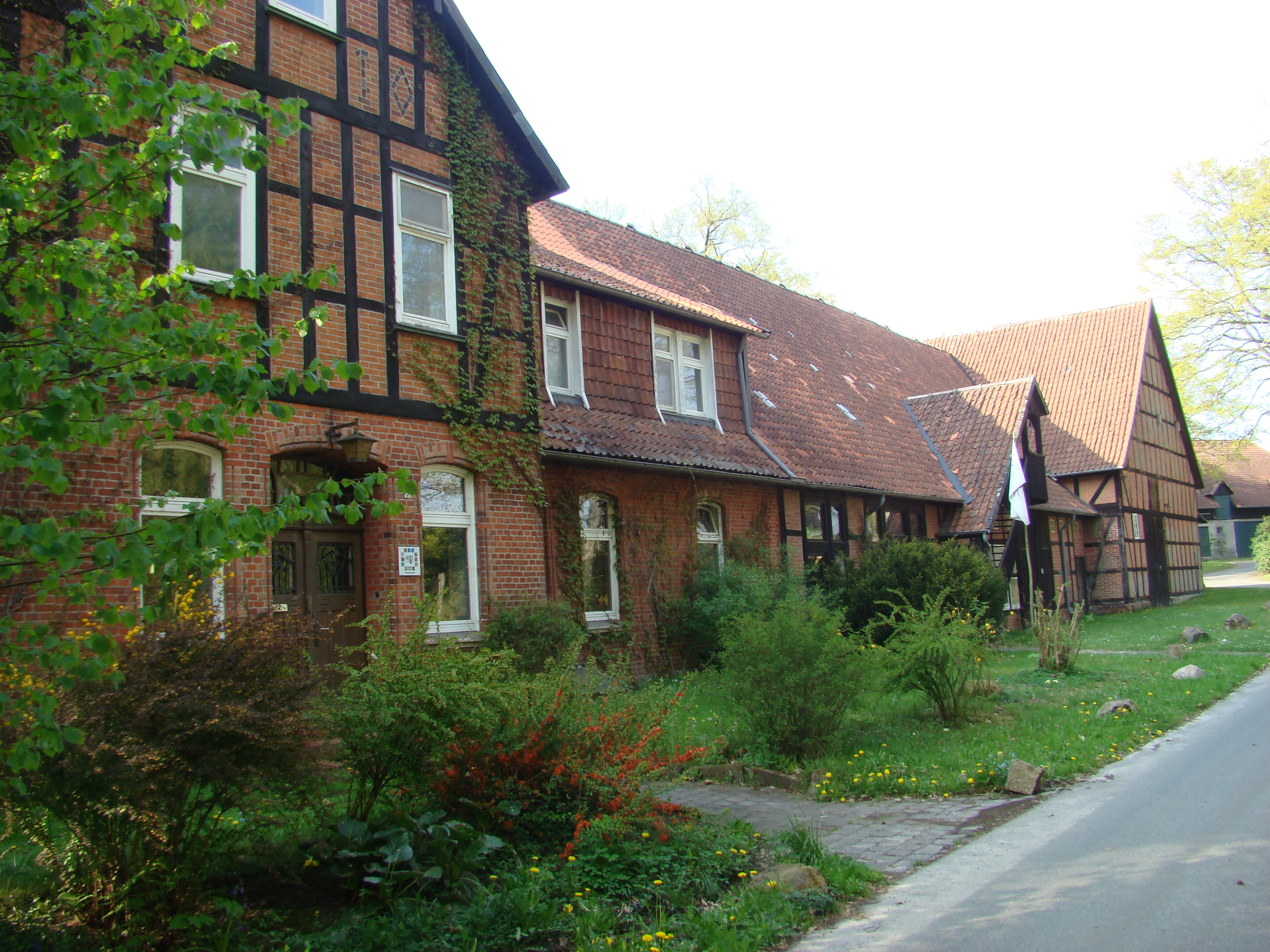
The manor house

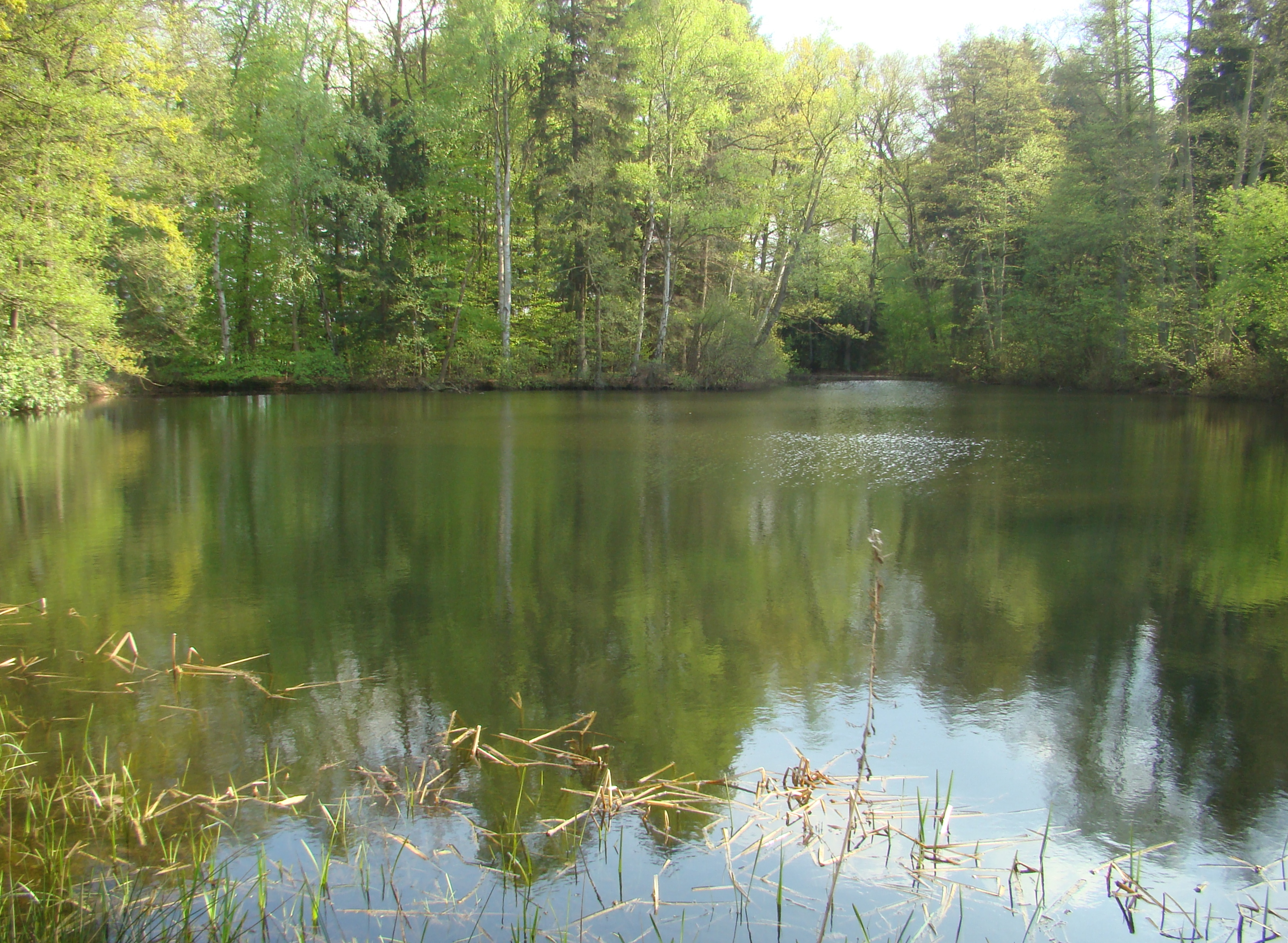
Pond by the turbine house

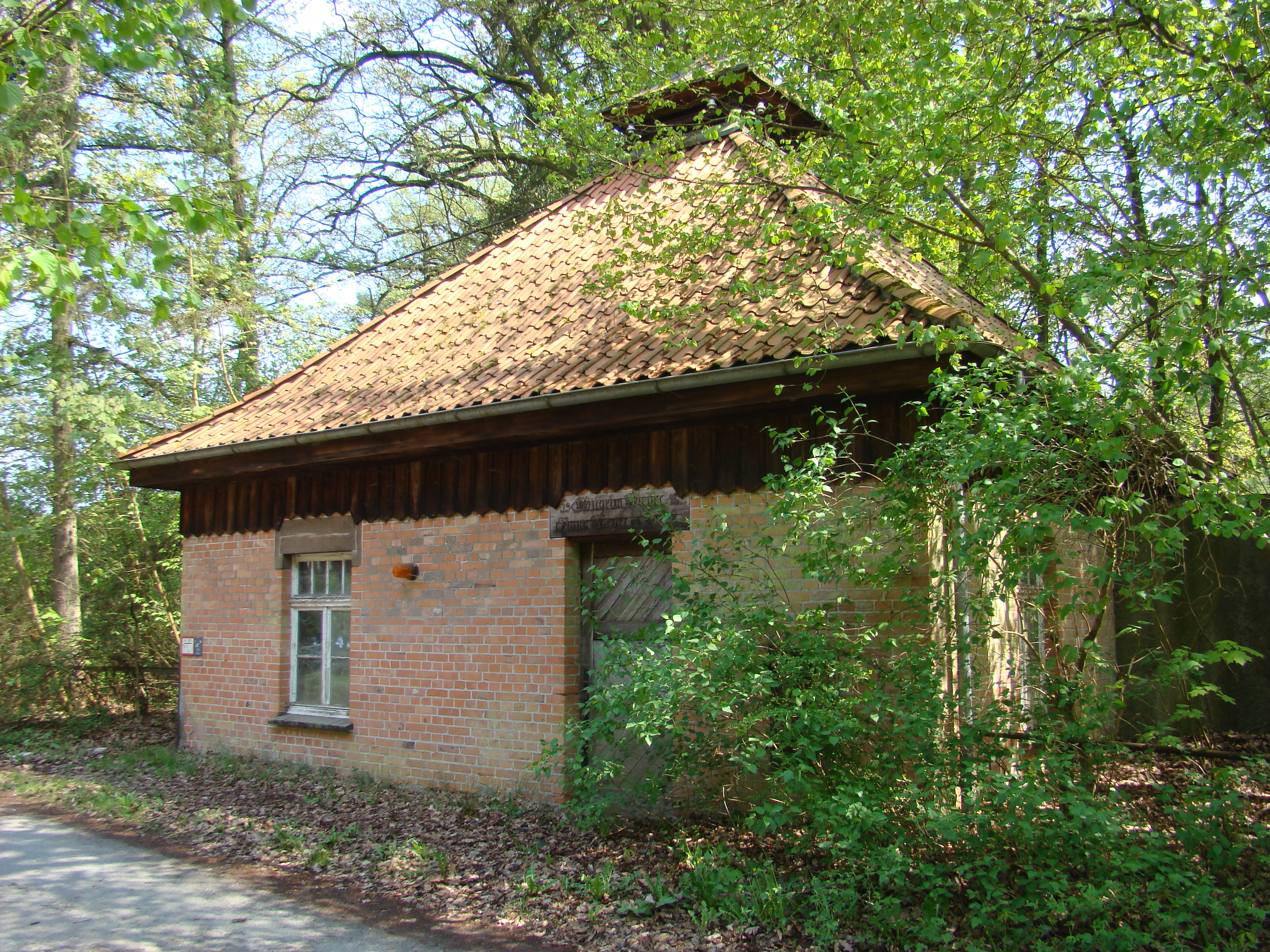
Turbine house for electricity generation

== Dehningshof ==
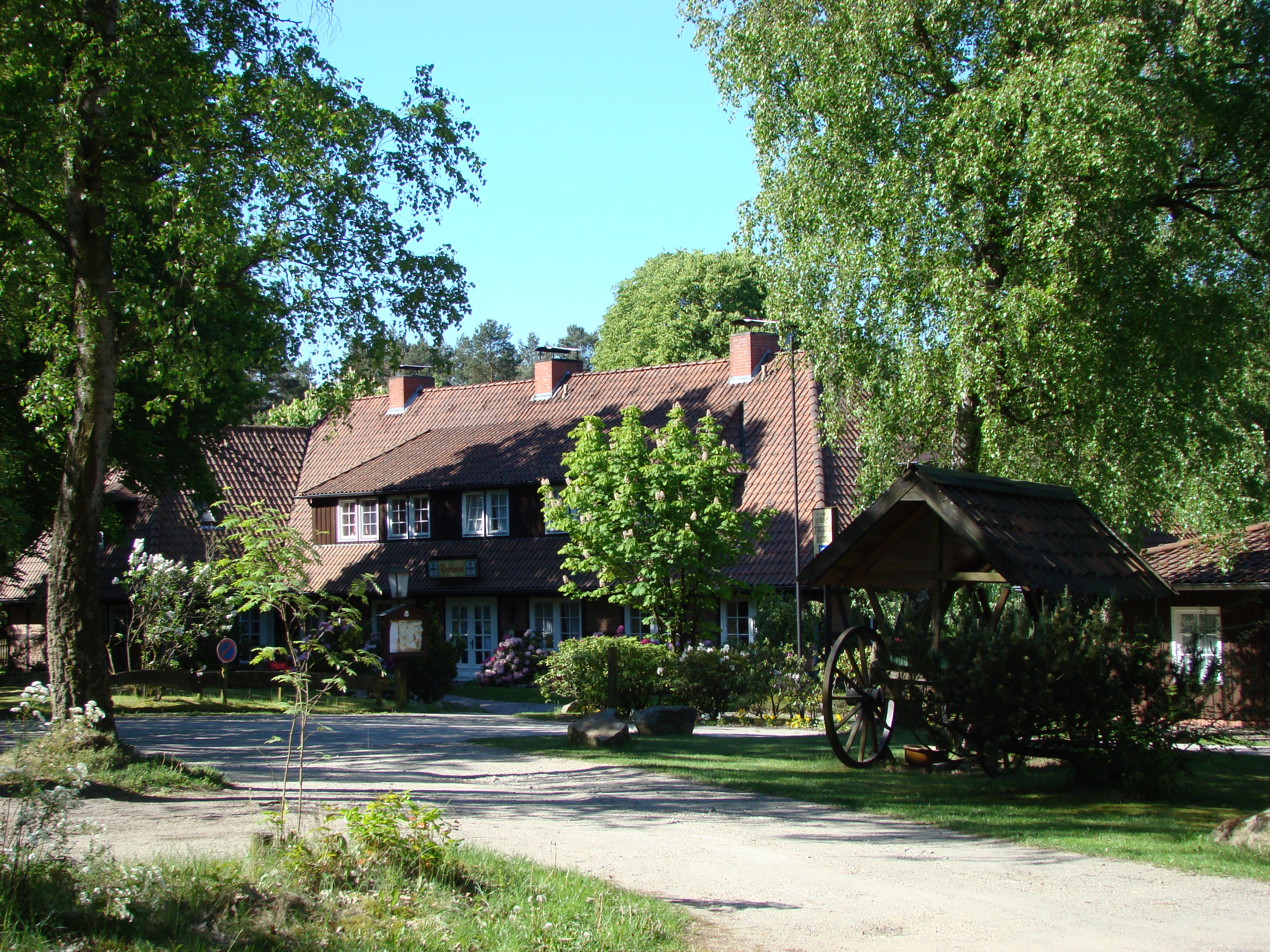
"Zur Alten Fuhrmannsschänke", Dehningshof

3.5 km southeast of Oldendorf lies Dehningshof farm. The name comes from Peter Heinrich Dehning (1781–1832), a carter (Fuhrmann) from Oldendorf, who had been looking for a place to set up a staging inn at this spot as early as 1804. After twice being rejected by the farmers from Oldendorf who had wood grazing rights there, he was granted a site, four morgens in area, on 11 May 1816, subject to various constraints. Dehning saw this place as suitable for a carter's tavern, because the Old Celle Military Road, from Hanover to Celle ran past here. They called the plot Sandschellen. This was a spot that was unsuitable for farming because it was covered with sandy soil. This name is still in common use by the villagers of Oldendorf today. Later, when new roads were built that no longer passed by here, the inn was closed. Around 1950 its then owner, Gustav Stucke, built another restaurant, which he called Zur Alten Fuhrmannsschänke ("The Old Carter's Tavern") The property was not connected to mains electricity. In the public rooms and guest rooms the tavern only had gas lights until the 1960s. Later, electricity was produced using a diesel generator set. In 1984 the tavern changed owners. Next a power cable was laid to the Dehningshof and a hotel with a guest house for riders was established. The tavern is still run in this form today, even though the owner has changed again. The E1 European long distance path runs right past the property.
