= Örtze =

River in Germany

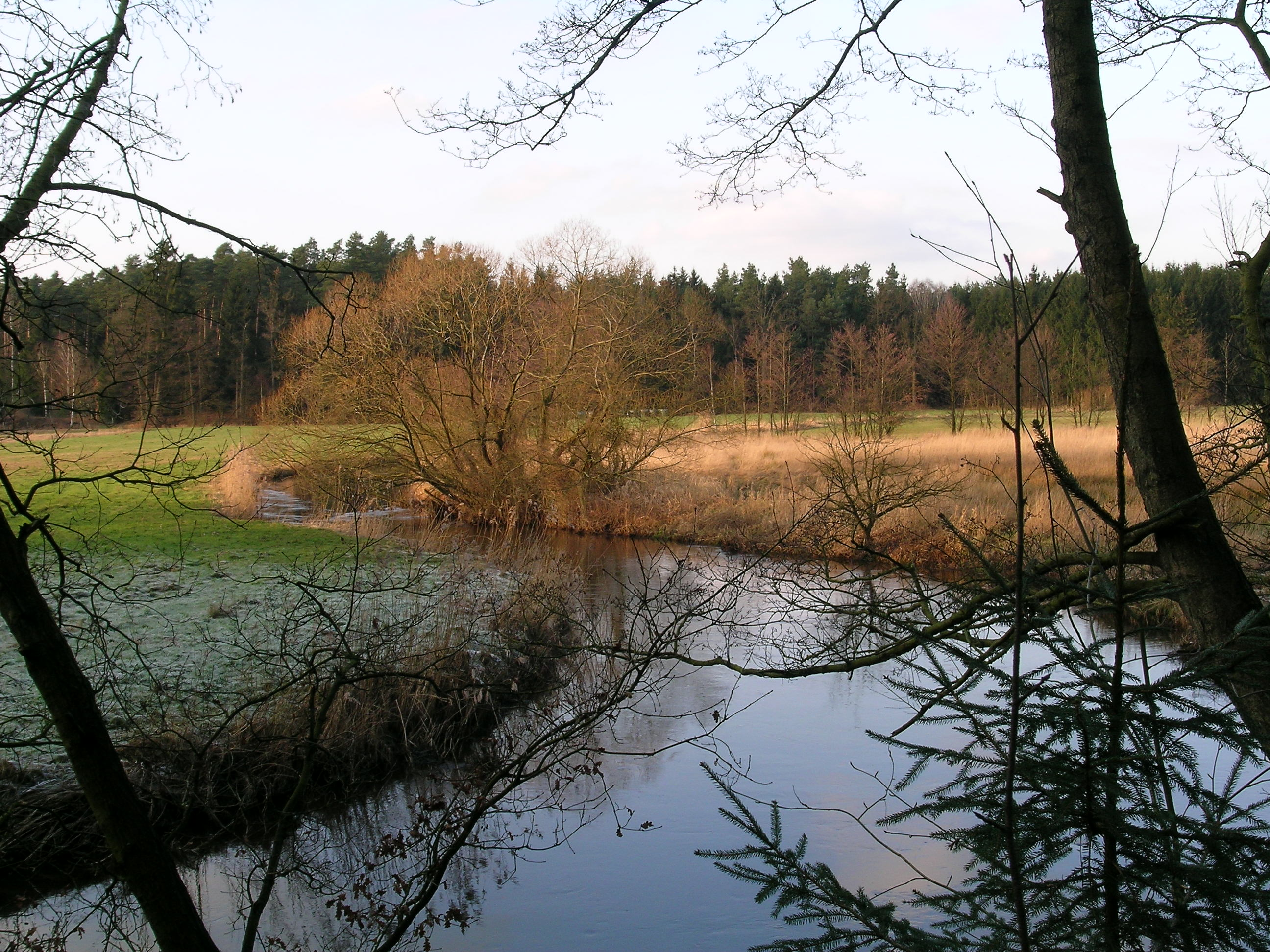
- The Örtze near Hermannsburg

Location
- Country: Germany
- State: Lower Saxony

Physical characteristics
- Source
  - location: north of Munster in the Große Heide (Bundesforst Raubkammer)
  - coordinates: 53°01′36″N 10°05′01″E
  - elevation: 86 m above sea level (NN)
- Mouth
  - location: into the Aller southeast of Winsen
  - coordinates: 52°40′17″N 9°55′54″E
  - elevation: 30 m above sea level (NN)
- Length: 62.3 km (38.7 mi) (with Aue and Wietze 70 km (43 mi))
- Basin size: 772 km^{2} (298 sq mi)

Basin features
- Progression: Aller→ Weser→ North Sea
- Landmarks: Small towns: Munster; Villages: Kreutzen, Poitzen, Müden, Hermannsburg, Oldendorf, Eversen and Wolthausen
- Tributaries
  - left: Kleine Örtze, Schmarbeck and Sothrieth (discharge as the Landwehrbach into the Örtze), Weesener Bach, Angelbach
  - right: Ilster, Wietze, Brunau, Brandenbach, Hasselbach, Mühlenbach

Örtze (German pronunciation: [ˈœʁtsə]) is a river of Lower Saxony, Germany. The Örtze rises north of Munster in the Große Heide (in the Raubkammer federal forest) and, after 62 kilometres (39 mi), joins the Aller southeast of Winsen.

== Source and course ==
The Örtze valley is an old glacial valley. It was formed during the Saale glaciation about 230,000 to 130,000 years ago by the drainage of meltwater from the ice sheet which cut 20 to 50 metres (65 to 165 ft) deep into the plateaus of the southern Lüneburg Heath. The upper Örtze has incised its own, much smaller valley into the sandur beds and the roughly 4 kilometres (2.5 mi) wide, flat glacial valley floor.

The source region of the Örtze and its several source bogs lie on the terrain of the Munster North Training Area. In order to remove suspended solids and sediments which are washed away during heavy rains from the tank training areas with their sparse covering of vegetation, four successive lakes – the so-called Munoseen – have been created on the Örtze, and, on the Ilster, the main headstream of the river, there is a further dam pond. The Örtze is the largest river on the Southern Heath or Südheide and drains its central area, between the rather longer Böhme to the west and the Ise to the east. It has a relatively steep incline. In the middle of the river in its lower course the stream flow is about 0.71 metres (2 ft 4 in) per second and the water depth varies from 0.5 to 2 metres (2 to 7 ft). It is classed as a so-called summer-cold heath stream (sommerkalter Heidebach).

The Örtze passes the towns and villages of Munster (an important military base in North Germany), Kreutzen, Poitzen, Müden, Hermannsburg (renowned because of the Hermannsburg Mission), Oldendorf, Eversen and Wolthausen.

The tributaries of the Örtze are the: Ilster, Kleine Örtze, Wietze, Schmarbeck and Sothrieth (which discharge together as the Landwehrbach into the Örtze), Brunau, Weesener Bach, Brandenbach, Hasselbach, Angelbach and Mühlenbach.

The main headstream of the Örtze is the Ilster. Its name recalls the largest village, which the Munster-North Training Area has to circumvent. Its largest tributary is the Wietze, which rises between Soltau and Munster and which, together with its tributary the Aue, is longer than the Örtze by a good 5 kilometres. It joins the Örtze near Müden and gave the heath village its name. The Kleine Örtze rises north of Oerrel (parish of Munster) and discharges into the Örtze near Kreutzen (parish of Faßberg). Before it was renaturalised its upper course acted as a drainage ditch for the former raised bog, now afforrested, in the narrow valley (nature reserve). On the headstreams of the Landwehrbach lies the Faßberg Air Base (north of Schmarbeck) and numerous old kieselgur pits (either side of the Sothrieth).

== Fauna and flora ==
Because Örtze has largely been spared from development, a near-natural habitat has been preserved. Its water quality is classed throughout as Class II: moderately polluted (saprobic system). Alders, pines and spruce along the river bank provide shade, keeping the water cool even in summer and the oxygen content high. The Örtze is relatively low in nutrients. Its course is meandering and structurally varied (strukturreich) in places and offers many places for fish to hide and spawn with its steep banks, hollows, gravel and sand banks.

The fish and animal species found in the river include: freshwater eels (Anguilla anguilla) and burbots (Lota lota), grayling (Thymallus thymallus), brown trout (Salmo trutta forma fario), bream (Abramis brama), minnow (Phoxinus phoxinus), perch (Perca fluviatilis), gudgeon (Gobio gobio), pike (Esox lucius), bullhead (Cottus gobio), roach (Leuciscus rutilus), rudd (Scardinius erytrophthalmus) and brook lamprey (Lampreta planeri). Even the endangered otter and kingfisher live here. Salmon fishing in the Örtze had been recorded since 1766, but the last salmon was caught in 1935. Since 1982 attempts have been made to re-introduce salmon by stocking the river. The weir at Wolthausen is, however, an obstacle to fish swimming upstream. From the 16th century until 1960 the Örtze drove the water wheel of a corn mill here. Today by contrast it powers a turbine next to the water wheel to generate electricity. A fish pass (a fish ladder with eight steps and suitable for invertebrates) is being planned.

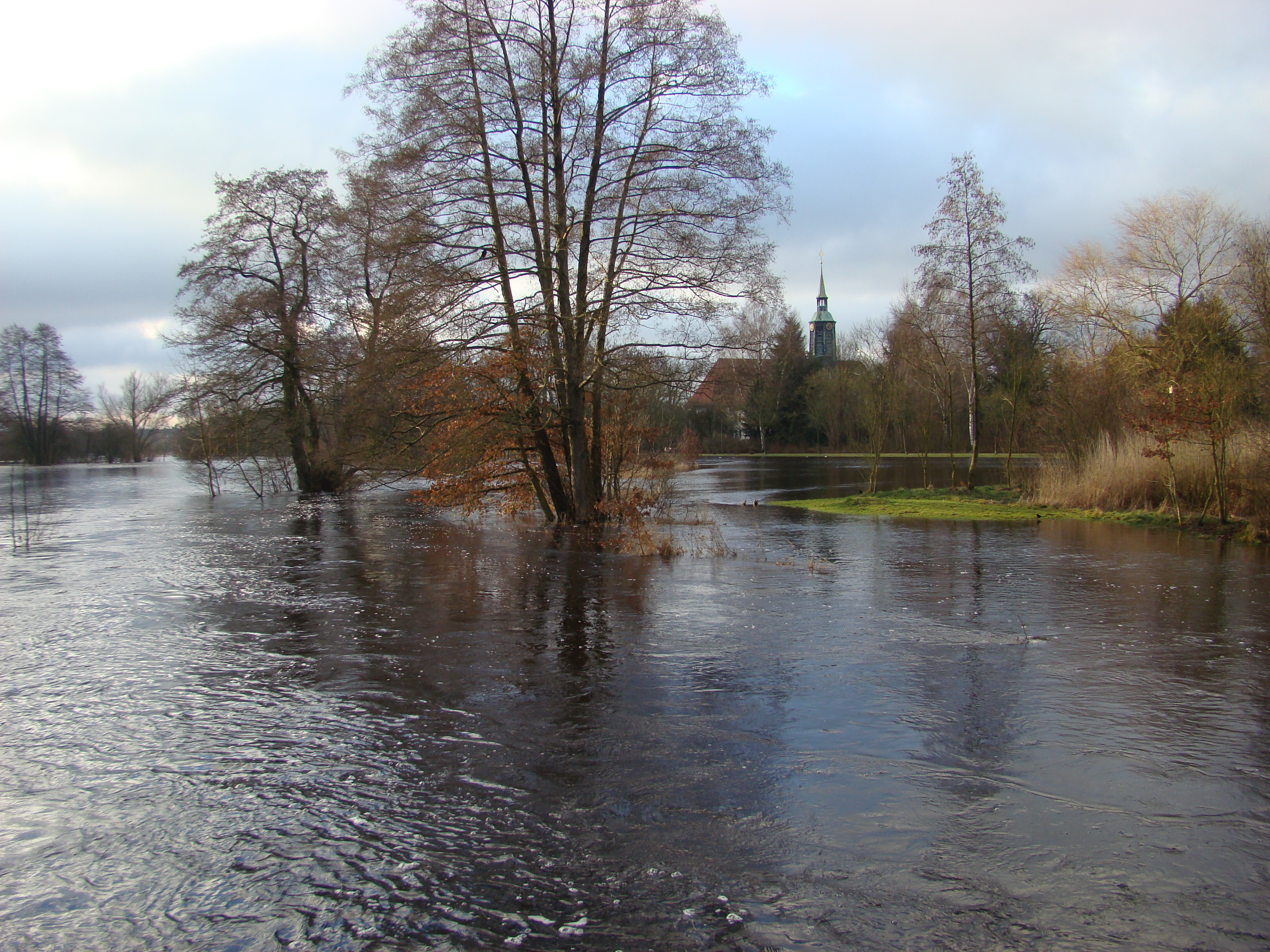
Örtze Park in Hermannsburg, in spring the Örtze regularly overspills its banks

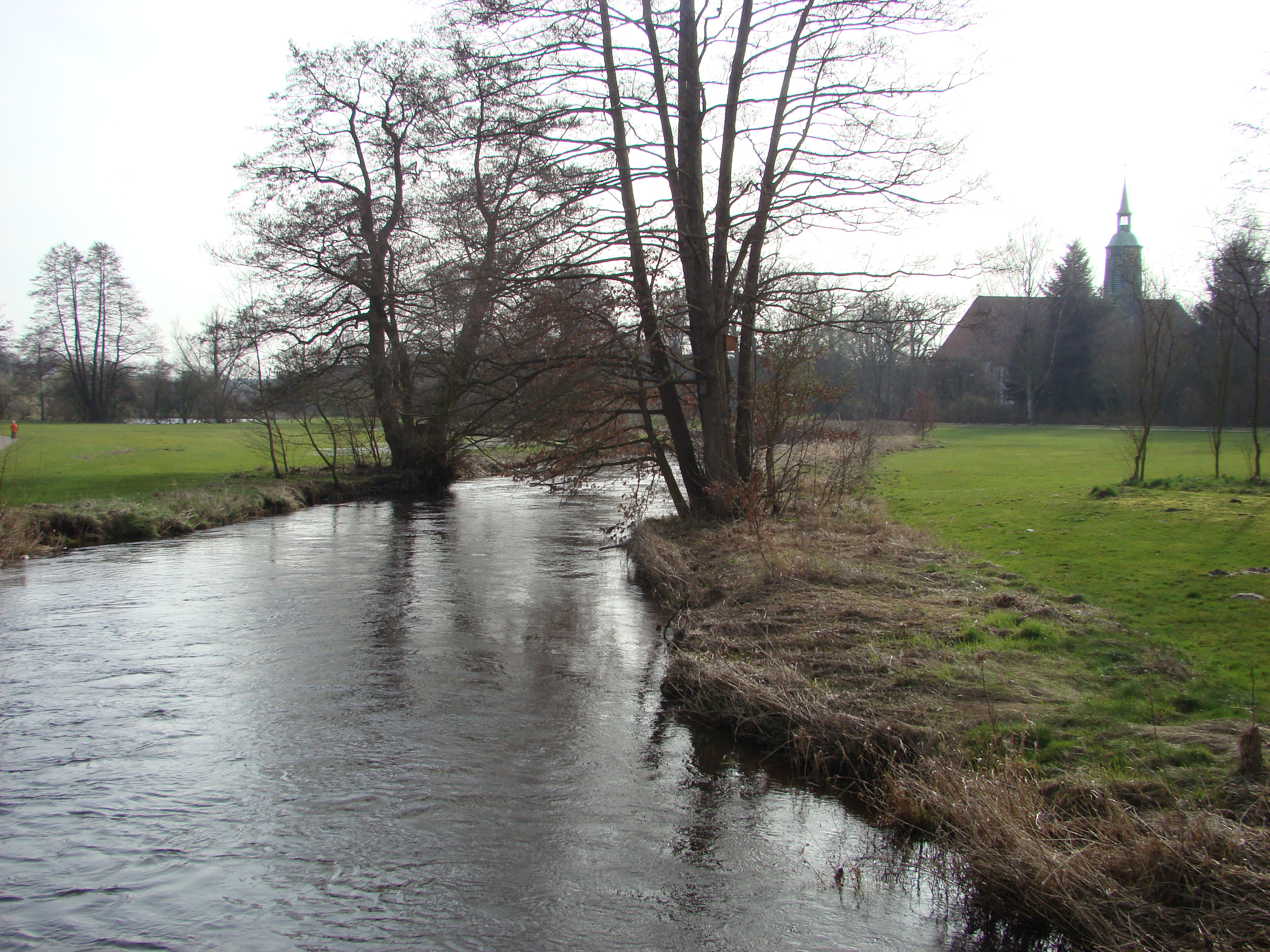
Örtze Park in Hermannsburg at normal water levels

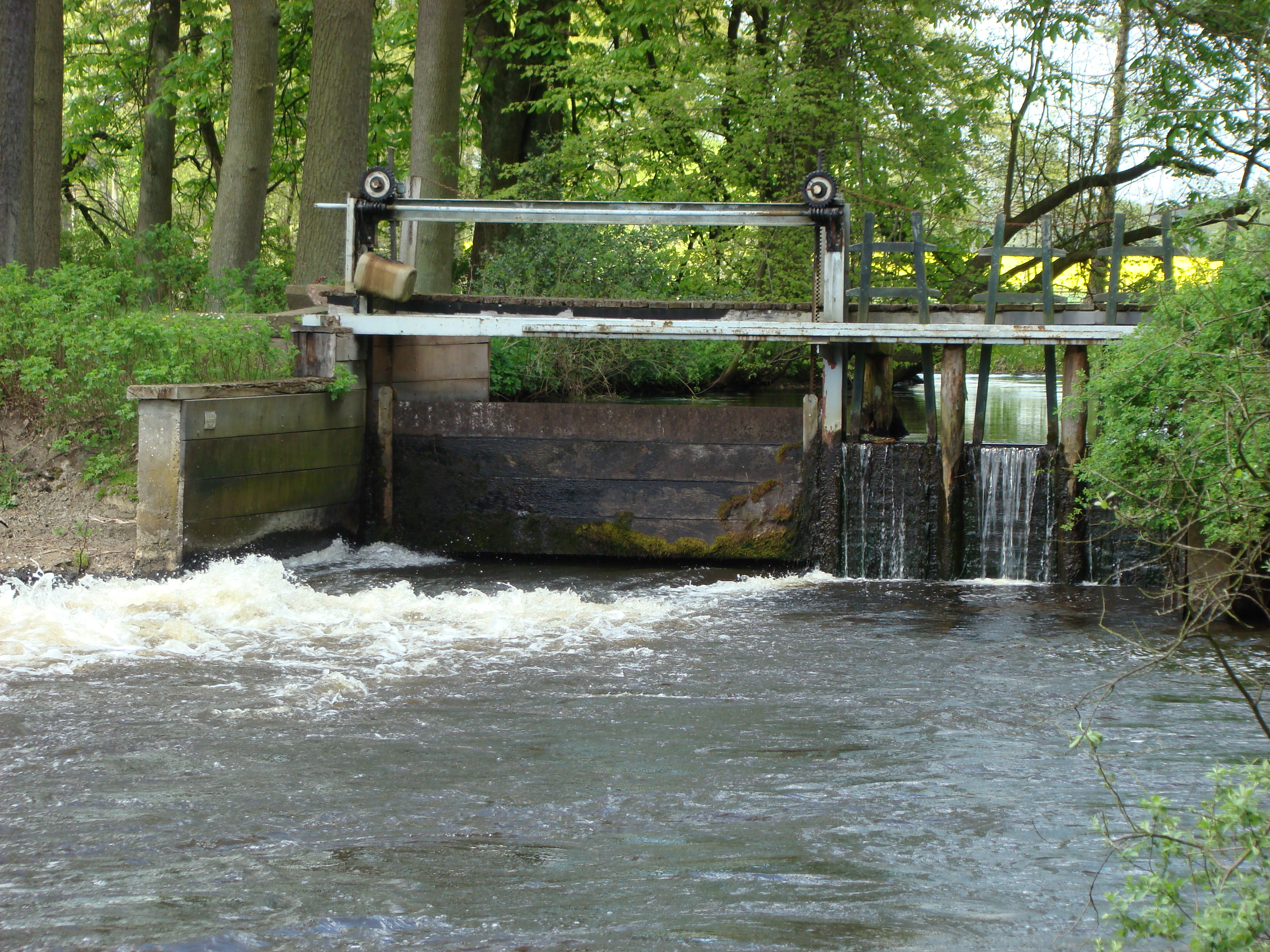
The weir in Wolthausen

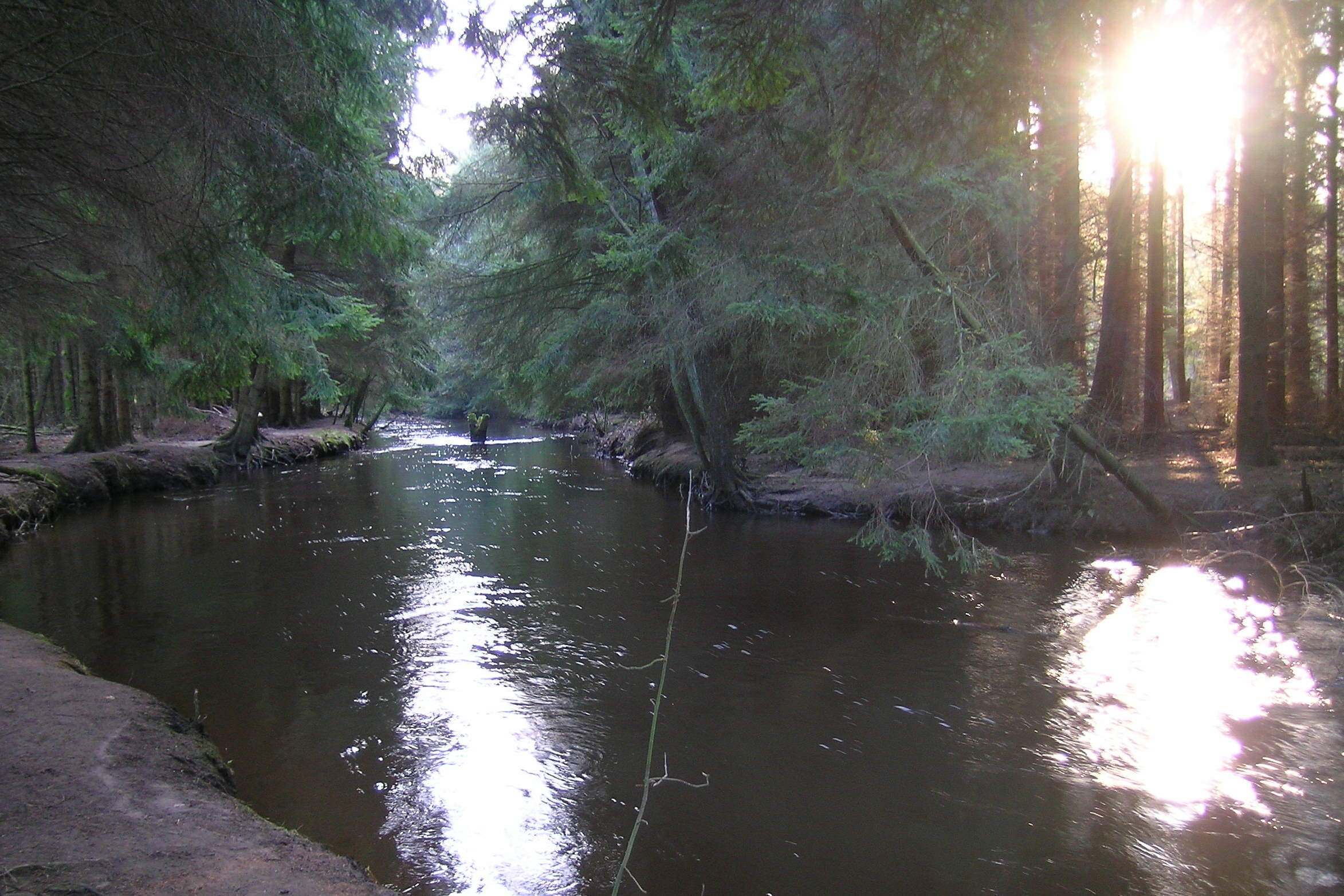
Örtze in the spruce woods near Hermannsburg

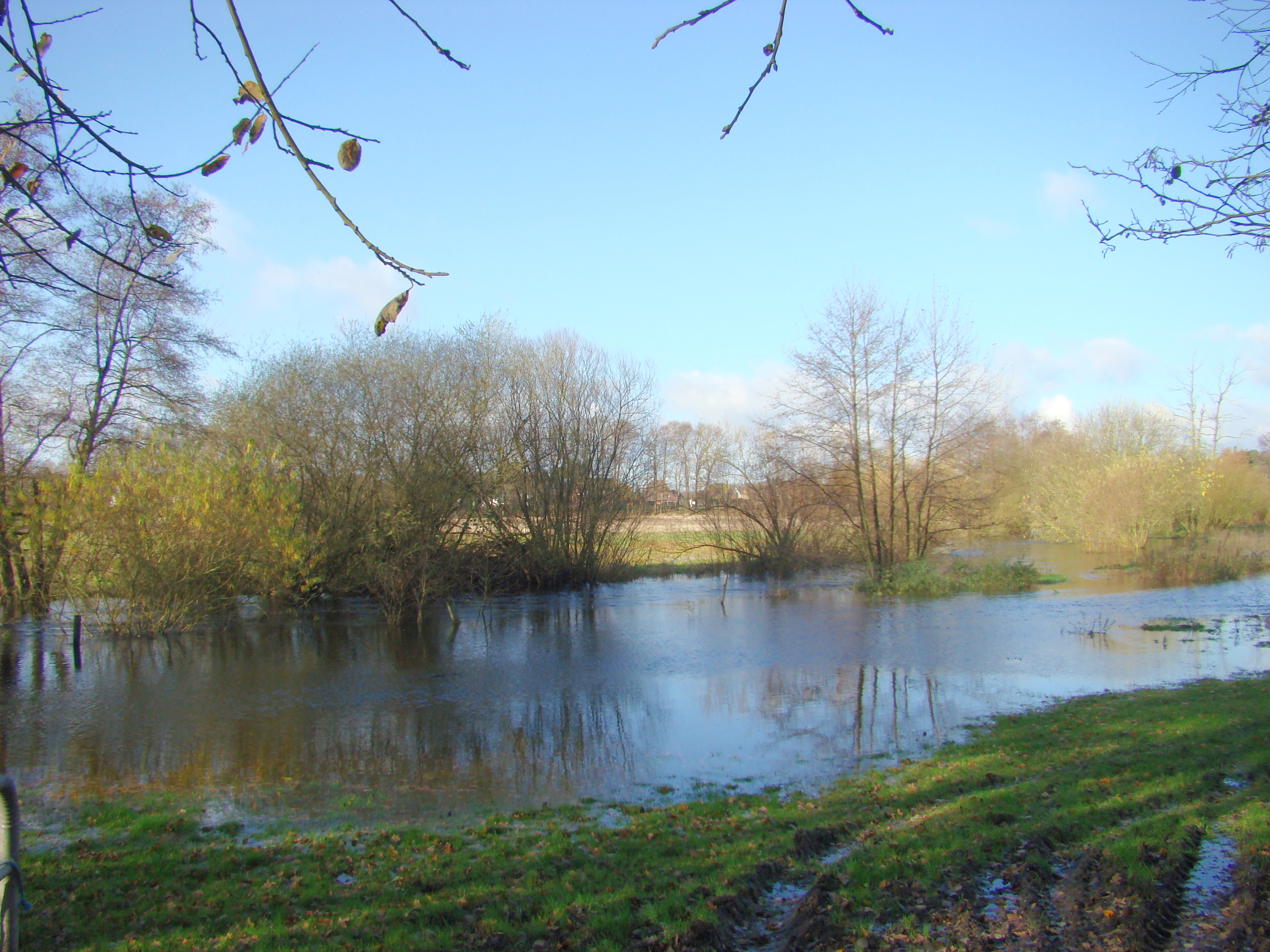
Flooded Örtze meadows

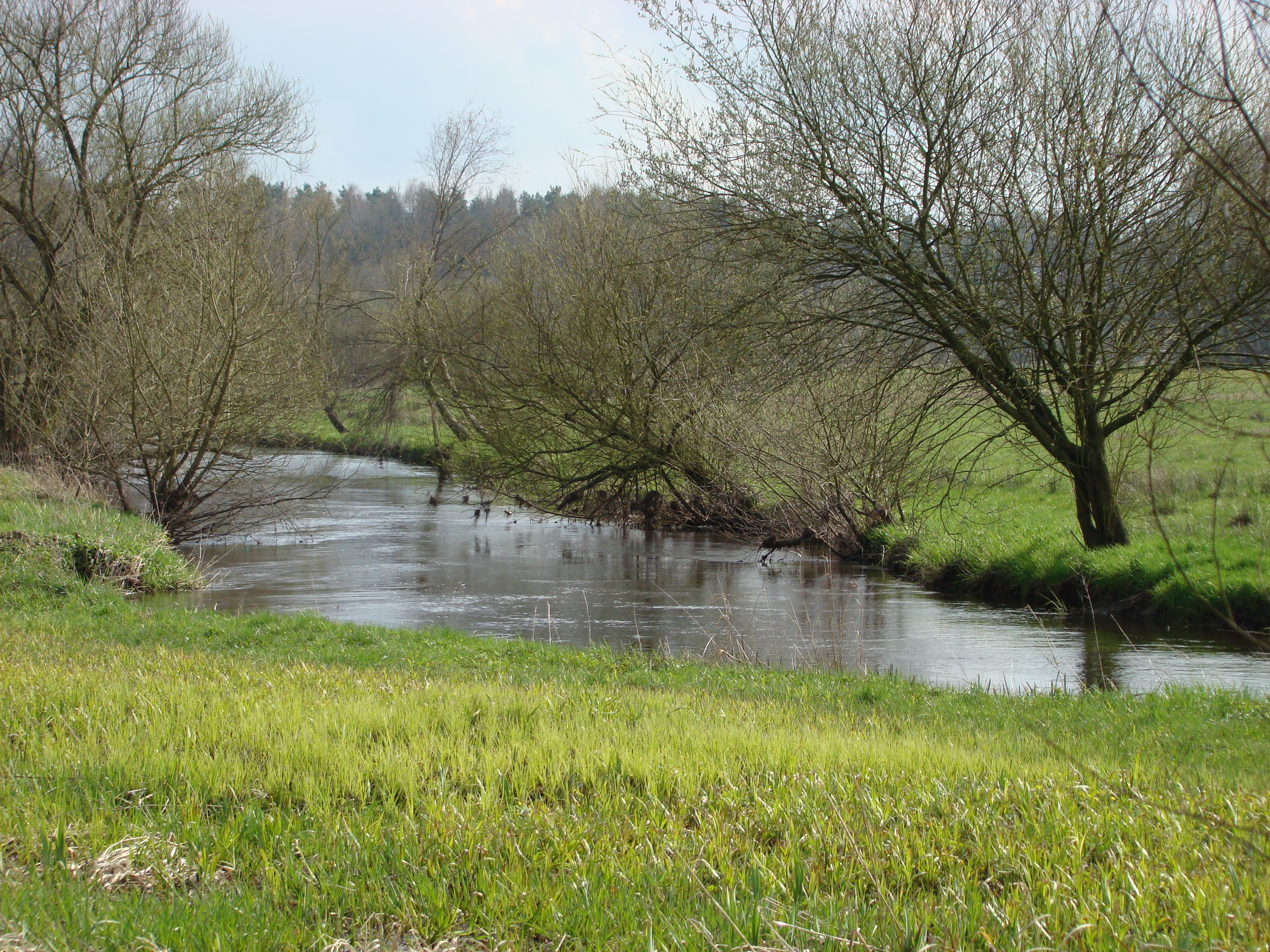
Örtze meadows near Oldendorf

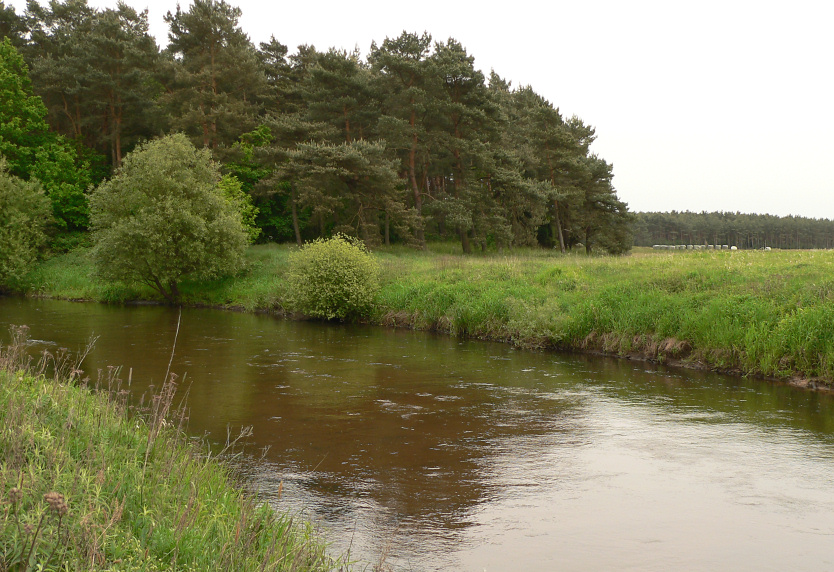
In the sandy and flat river bed just before it joins the Aller

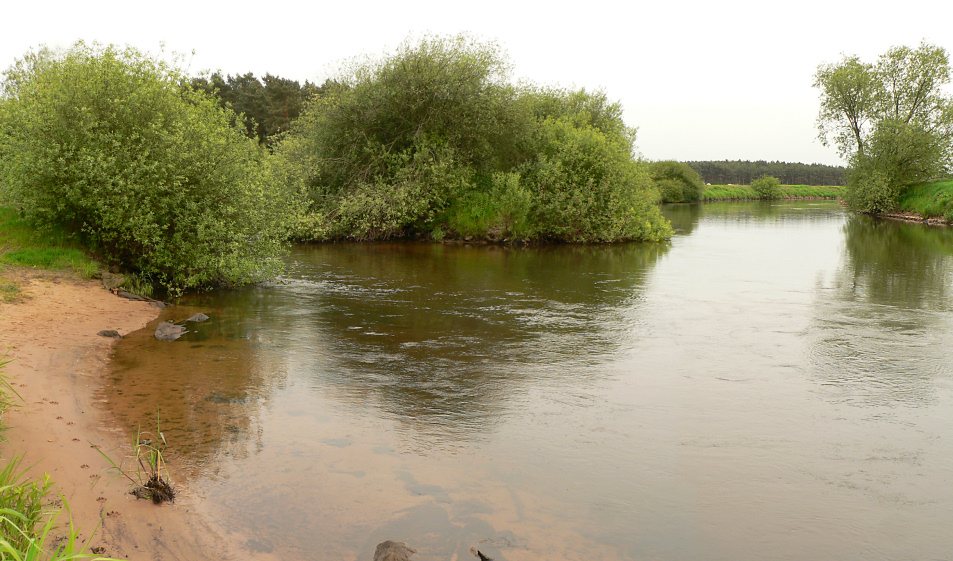
Mouth of the Örtze, from the left

== Boating on the Örtze ==
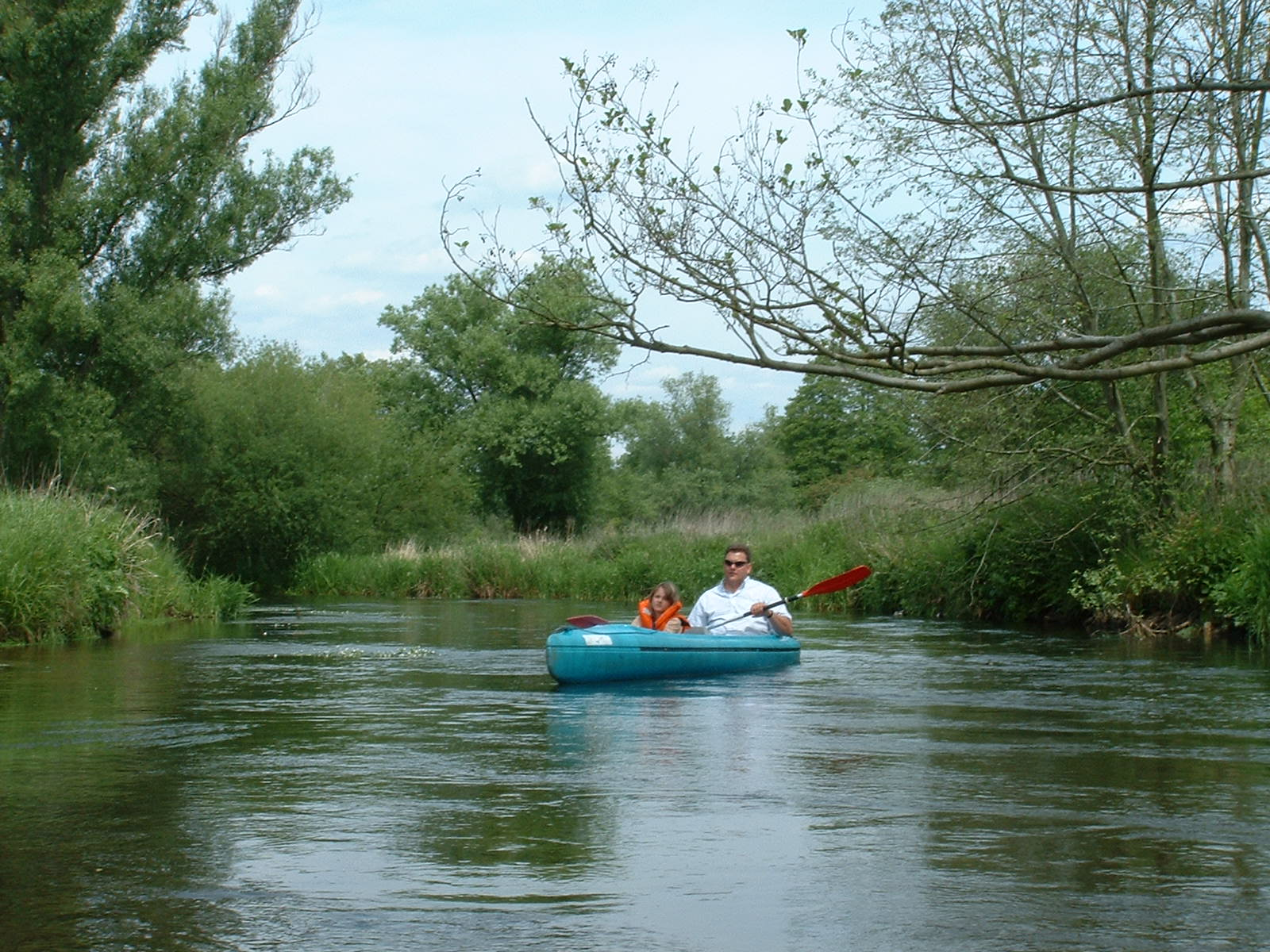
Two-man kayak on the Örtze

Boating is permitted on the Örtze during the summer months, from 16 May to 14 October, between 9 am and 6 pm, provided it does not harm the natural environment. The only types of craft allowed are rowing boats (e.g. kayaks or canoes). The Örtze may be used downstream of the mill in Müden. There are launching places in Müden, Baven, Hermannsburg, Oldendorf, Eversen, Wolthausen and Winsen.

== In literature ==
The regional writer Hermann Löns devoted a chapter to the Örtze with several pages. He wrote inter alia:

On the banks of the Örtze. Many rivers and streams has the Lüneburg Heath; but its truest heath river is the Örtze. As a heath maiden she has no desire for other lands; in the heath she is born and in the heath she wants to end. She is so modest, so wise and so still, like a real child of the heath; it would be an easy thing for her if she went her own way to the sea, because even in the driest summer she has enough water, the brooks and streams from the moors, the Schmarbeck and Sotriet, Lutter and Wittbeck, Wietze and Brunau, do not let her go thirsty. But there is nothing for her in the wider world.

— Hermann Löns, Mein braunes Buch – Heidbilder (1909)

== Meadow irrigation ==
Until the 1950s the meadows in the floodplain of the Örtze were irrigated, and fertilised by the minerals and organic substances in the river water, using a principle known as Lüneburger Rückenbau or Suderburger Rückenbau.

To irrigate the Baven meadows (Rieselwiesen) a canal was laid between 1831 and 1850 and opened in 1854. It began near Müden with a weir at the start of the diversion. Other weirs distributed the water from the canal into the meadows. Today the canal acts as a floodway.

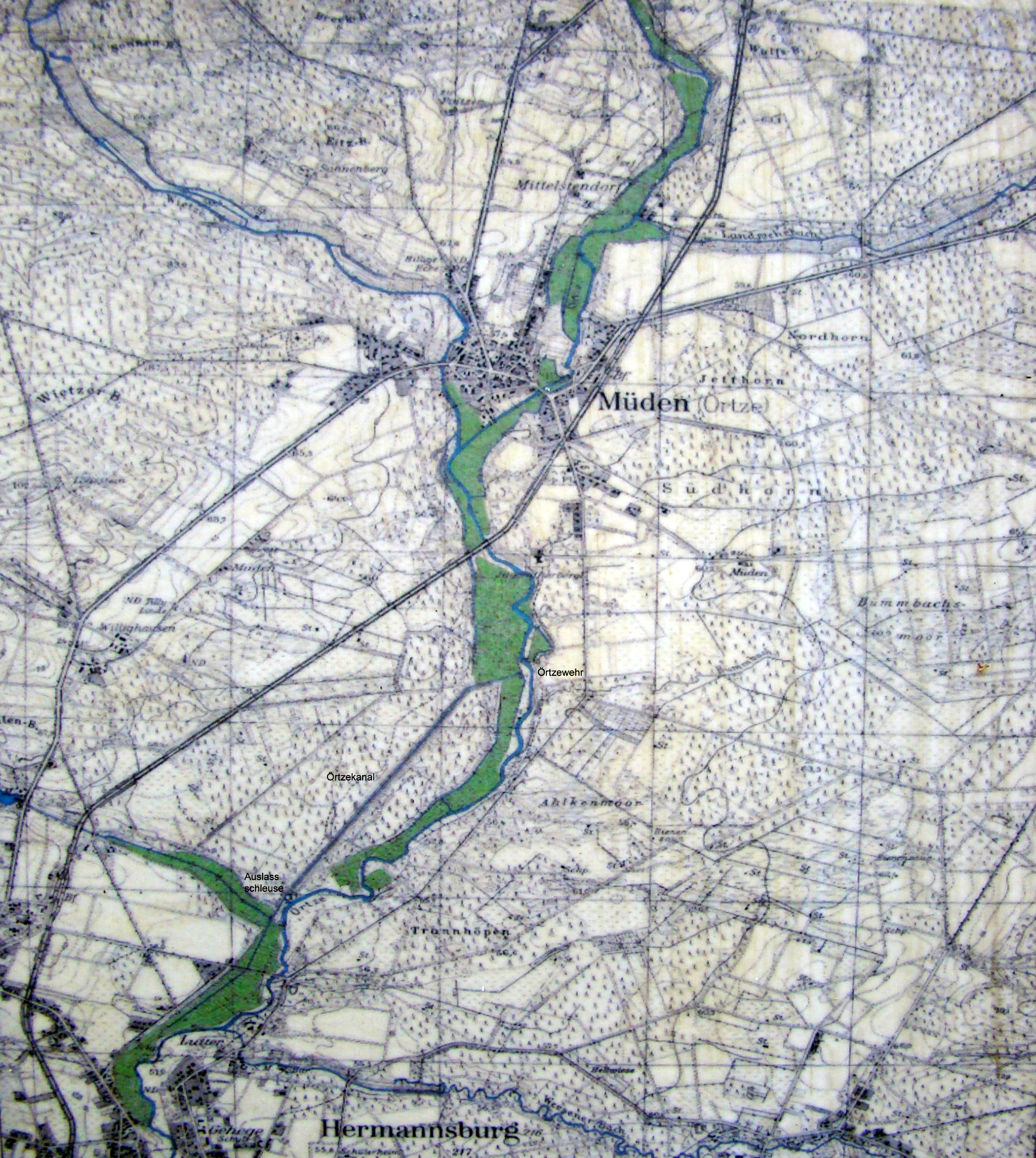
Overview map of the irrigated meadows between Müden and Hermannsburg

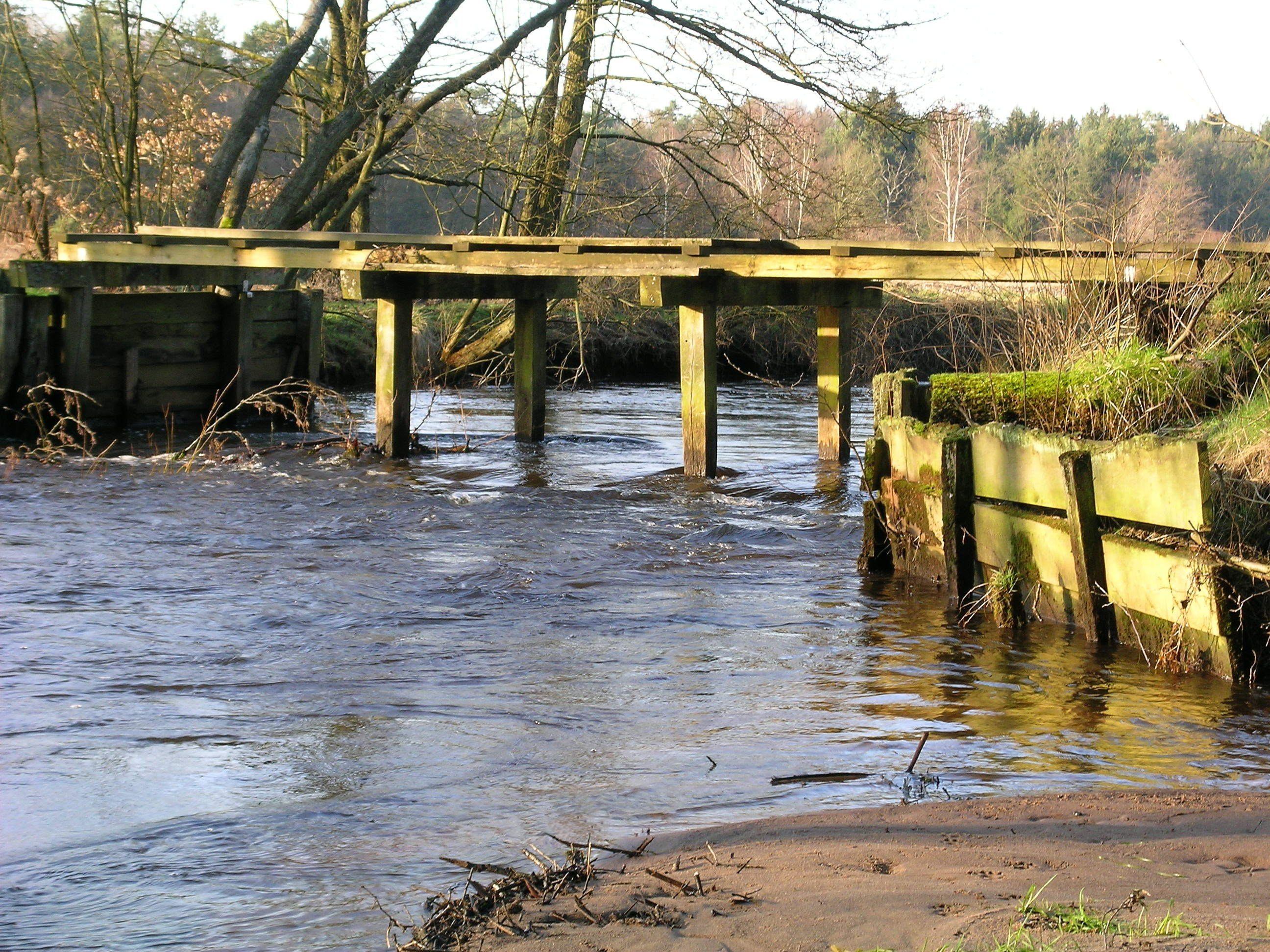
Old Örtze weir near Müden, at the start of the canal

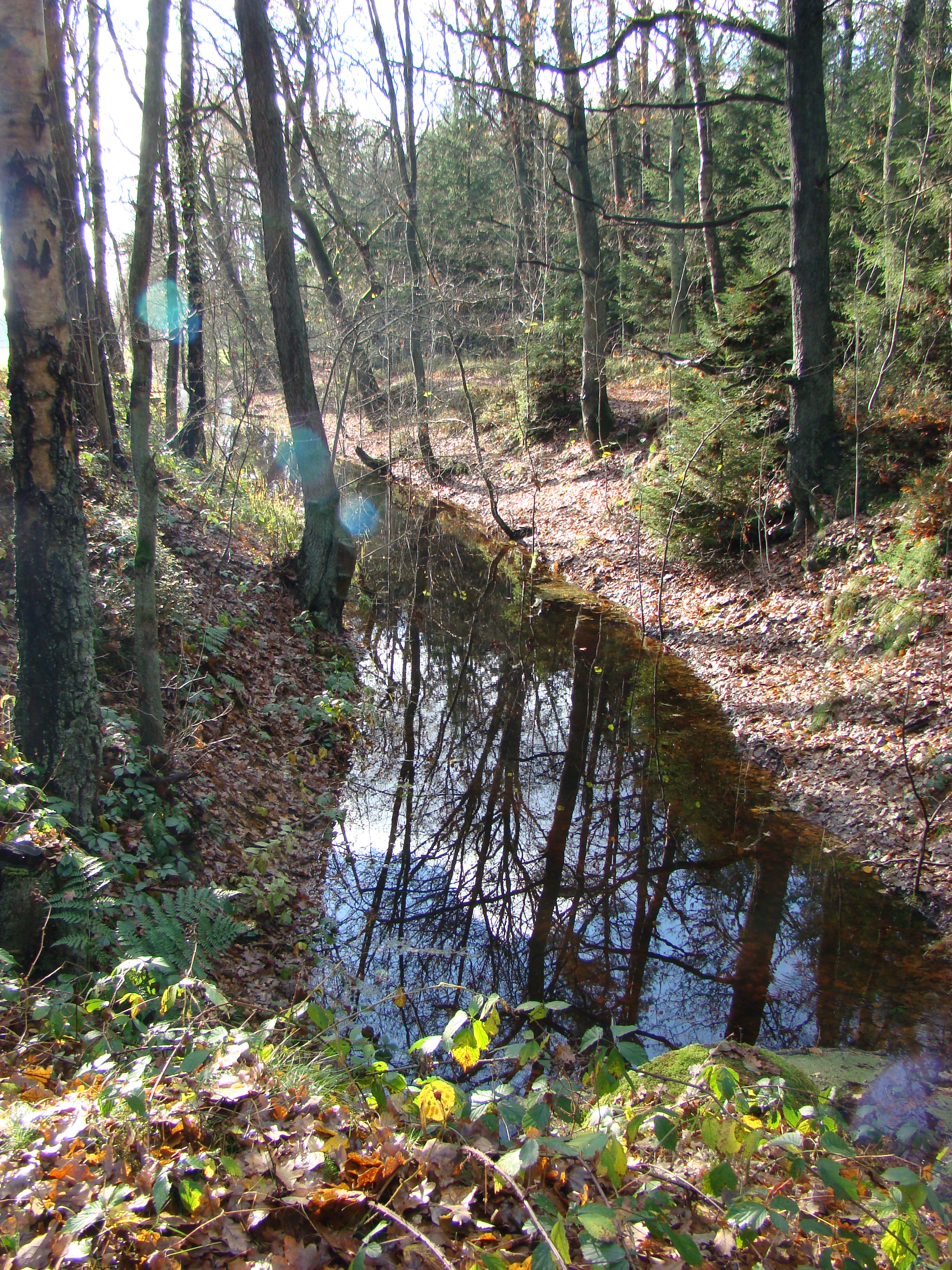
Overgrown Örtze canal between Müden and Hermannsburg

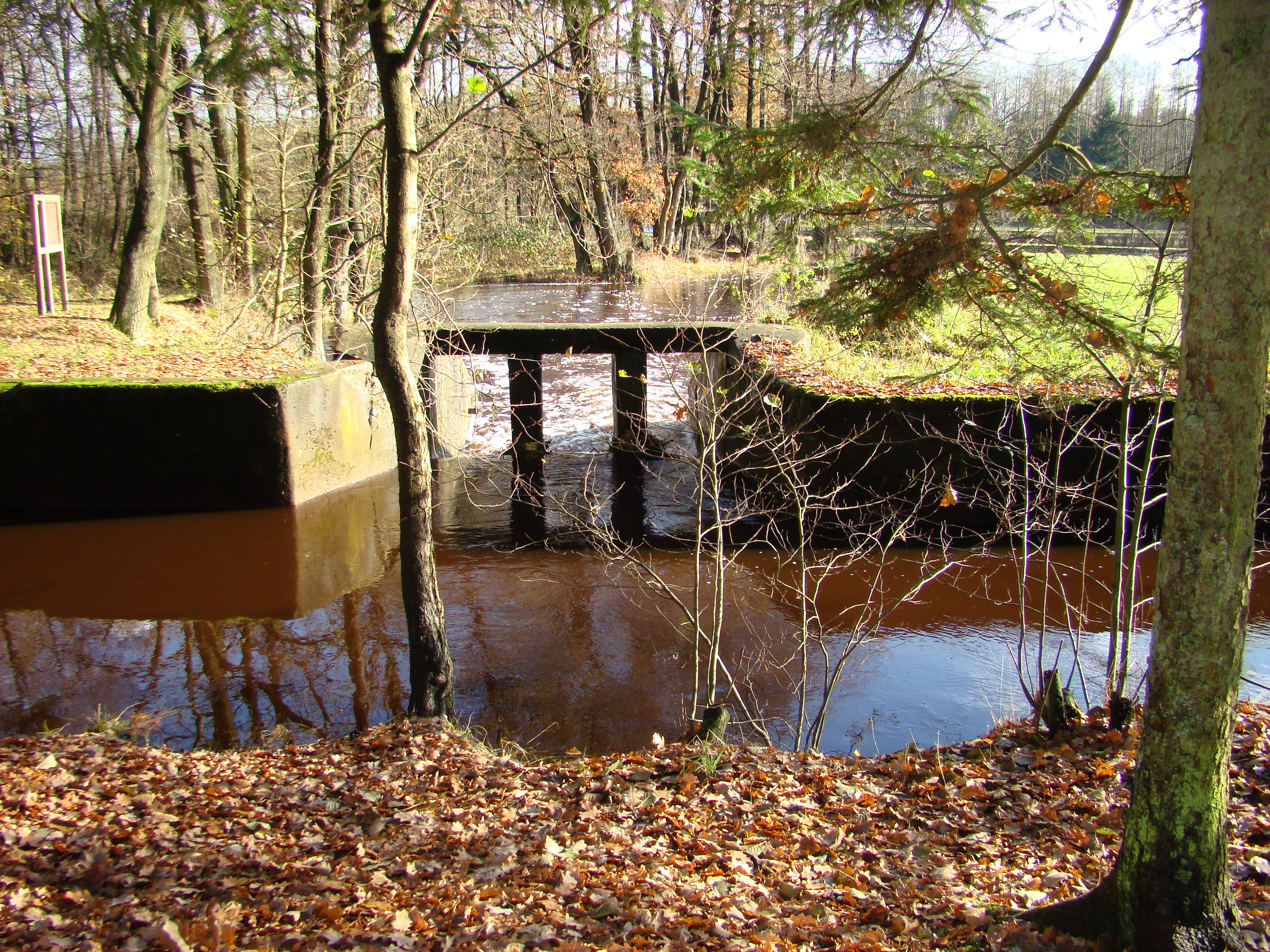
Old outlet lock near Hermannsburg/Baven

== Timber rafting ==
=== History ===
Timber rafting on the Örtze probably began in the 17th century. On 28 February 1677 the prince's master rafter (Floßmeister), Johann Bastian Erhardt, looked into the possibility of using the river to float timber downstream from forest in the areas of Hassel, Lüß and Kalbsloh. He gave the following report to the senior forester of Wahrenholz:

The Örtze is a good, fast waterway which, in many places, has high banks on both sides and is therefore suitable for rafting both long as well as short logs to Stedden, where the Örtze shoots into the Aller.

This expert opinion led to timber rafting being established on the Örtze.

In the 19th century, timber rafting on the Örtze assumed great importance for the region. The number of rafts increased from around 600 per year in 1868 to 1,946 in 1874, which reflected the economic boom of the so-called Gründerzeit years. Demand was generated by the construction of buildings and ships at Bremen, Bremerhaven and in the district of Wesermarsch. Its supply, by contrast, was from private landowners and local communities (Realgemeinden) to whom large areas of old forest had been transferred following the division of common land in the mid-19th century. From 1877 the number of rafts on the Örtze fell rapidly, especially when its lower reaches silted up and became too shallow. From 1912 timber rafting came to a standstill. Competition came from the Celle-Soltau, Celle-Munster Light Railway built in 1910 and the metalled roads and new sawmills in the immediate vicinity.

Number of rafts from 1869 to 1910 (from the files of the district committee for rafting on the Oertze)

Year	No. of rafts	Year	No. of rafts	Year	No. of rafts	Year	No. of rafts
1869	1592						
1870	1262	1880	546	1890	182	1900	160
1871	1446	1881	522	1891	220	1901	135
1872	1733	1882	371	1892	n.E.	1902	134
1873	1788	1883	350	1893	148	1903	123
1874	1946	1884	286	1894	139	1904	51
1875	1476	1885	211	1895	145	1905	70
1876	1130	1886	257	1896	206	1906	61
1877	695	1887	207	1897	216	1907	17
1878	583	1888	255	1898	186	1908	31
1879	611	1889	232	1899	201	1909	22
						1910	14

=== Technology ===
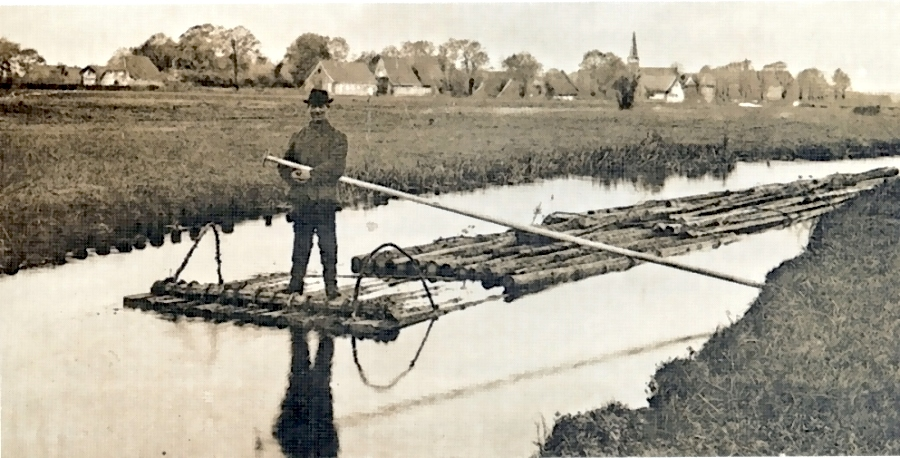
Wilhelm Witte, one of the last rafters on the Örtze, around 1910

The Örtze was navigable by timber rafts all year round from its confluence with the Wietze near Müden to the Aller thanks to its water-retentive, sandy river bed. A timber raft could travel these 36 river kilometres (22 mi) in a day. In the second half of the 19th century there were also 11 raft-building points from Müden to Oldendorf where the logs hauled to the river by horse and cart were tied together to form a raft. On the Aller the logs were bound together to form even larger rafts and floated down to their offloading point in Bremen. From there the wood was shipped to England, the Netherlands, France or Spain.

The rafts were 23 metres (75 ft) long and 3 metres (10 ft) wide. One feature were the rounded willow hoops at the front, the so-called hand rails (Handregels), which the rafter could grab in an emergency. The rafter carried a pole (Schufstaken or Schufboom) for manoeuvering the raft which he pressed against the left shoulder with a T handle. It was fitted with an iron spike and hook at the end.

== See also ==
- List of rivers of Lower Saxony

== Sources ==
- Jürgen Delfs: Die Flößerei auf Ise, Aller und Örtze, Gifhorn 1995, ISBN 3-929632-24-1
