= Wolthausen =

- Ortsteil of Winsen (Aller)
- Interactive map of Wolthausen
- Location within Germany Location within Lower Saxony
- Coordinates: 52°41′39″N 9°58′48″E
- Country: Germany
- State: Lower Saxony
- District: Celle
- Municipality: Winsen (Aller)
- Elevation: 39 m (128 ft)
- Time zone: UTC+01:00 (CET)
  - Summer (DST): UTC+02:00 (CEST)
- Postal codes: 29308
- Dialling codes: 05143

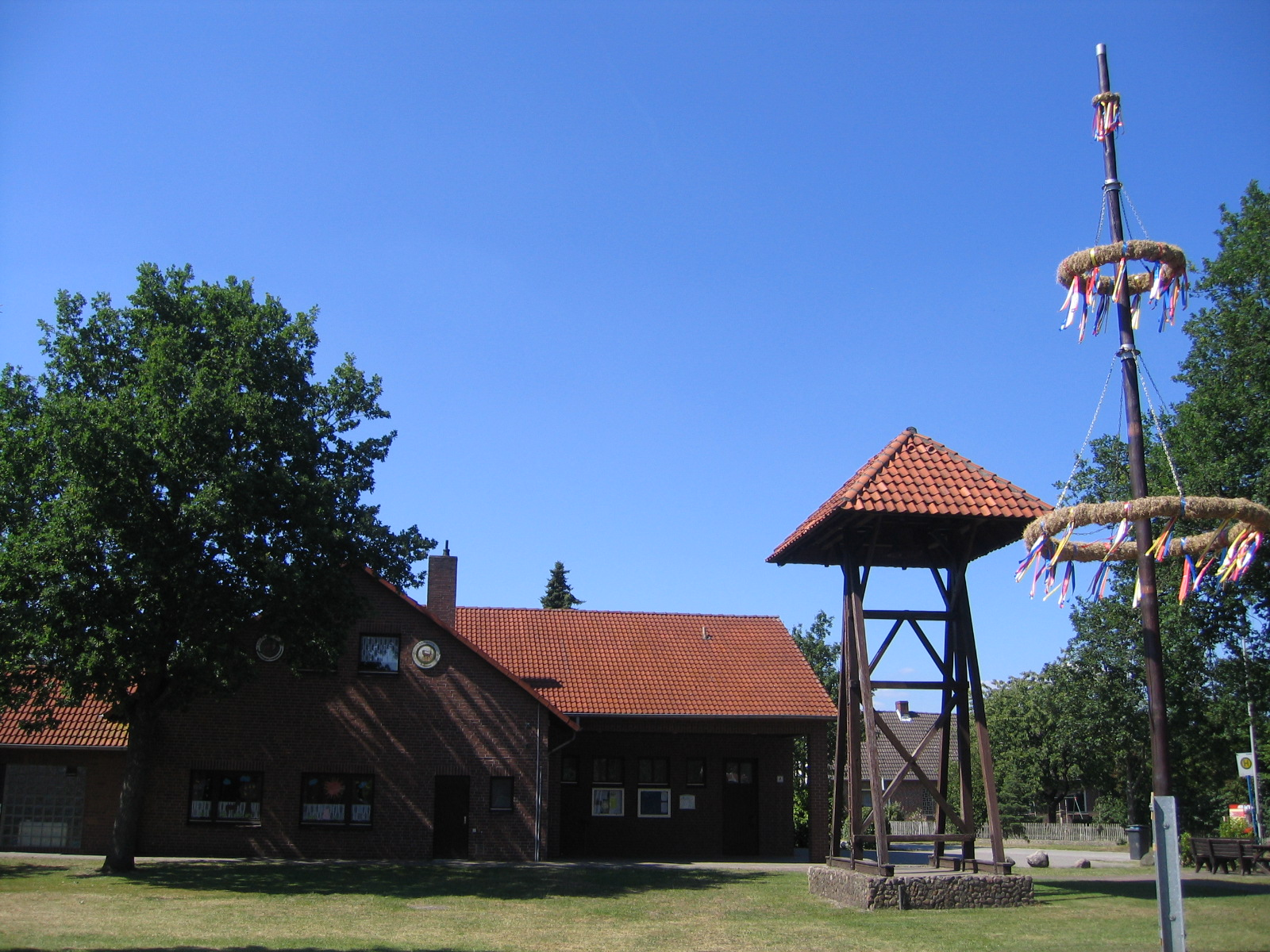
Wolthausen village hall

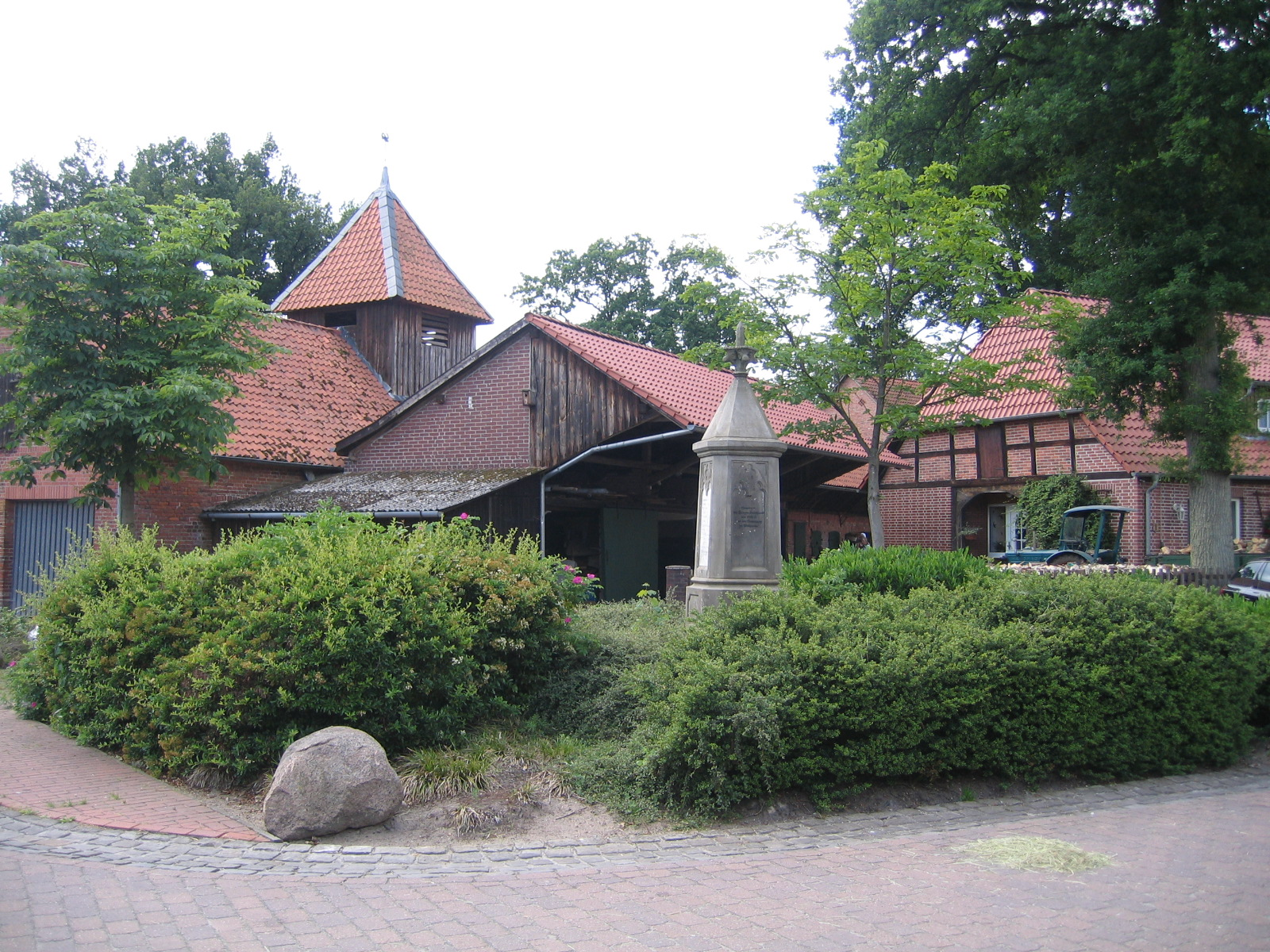
Wolthausen war memorial commemorating the fallen of the Franco-Prussian, 1st and 2nd World Wars

Wolthausen is a village (Ortsteil) in the municipality of Winsen (Aller) in the district of Celle in the north German state of Lower Saxony. It lies on the River Örtze in the Aller valley and on the B 3 federal road.

== Politics ==
Wolthausen has a joint council with the neighbouring village of Stedden.

The council chair is Christian Peters (CDU).
