= Ilster =

River in Germany

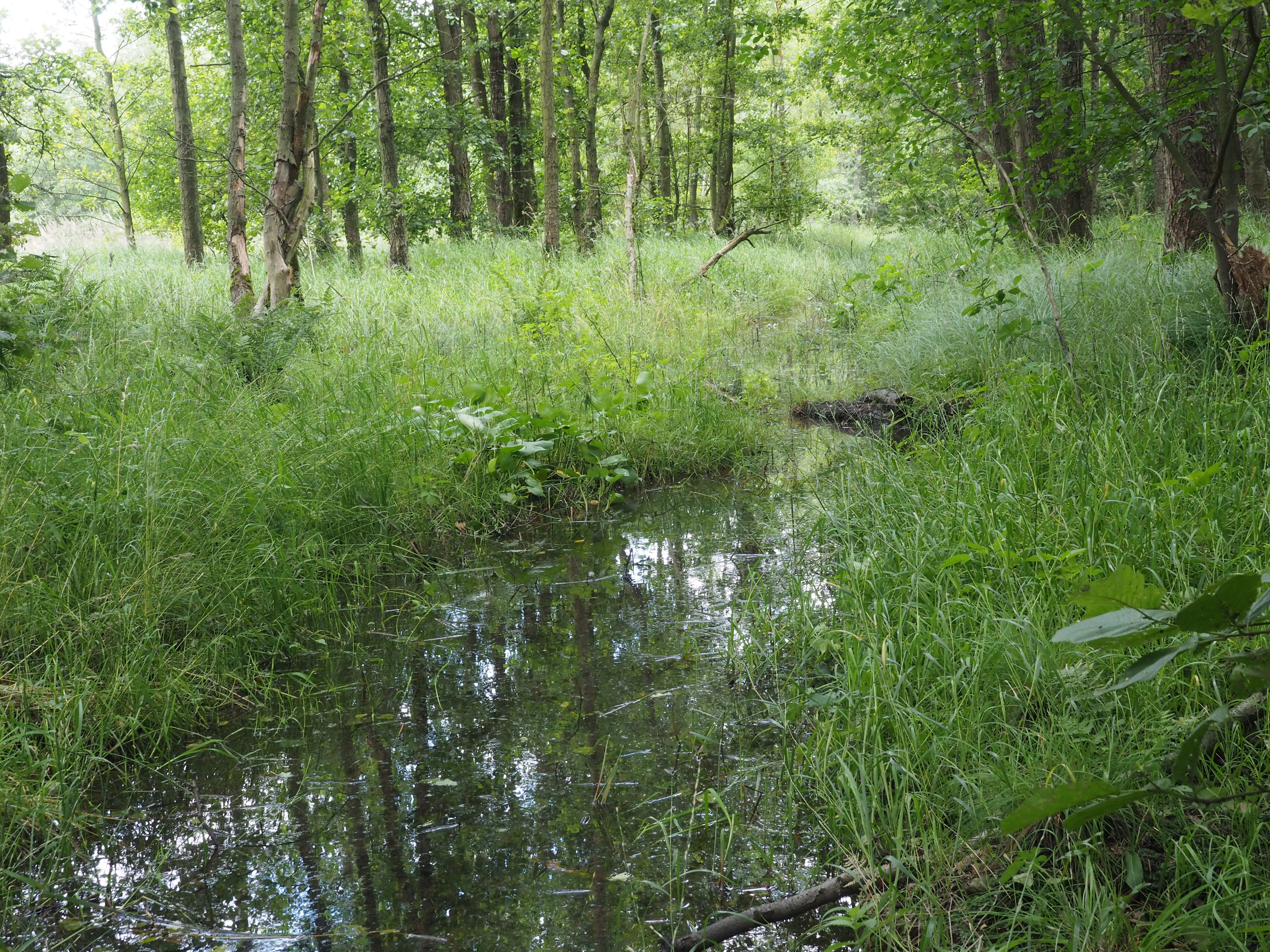

Location
- Country: Germany
- States: Lower Saxony

Physical characteristics
- Mouth
  - location: Örtze
  - coordinates: 53.0247°N 10.0851°E

Basin features
- Progression: Örtze→ Aller→ Weser→ North Sea

Ilster is a small river of Lower Saxony, Germany. It flows into the Örtze north of Munster.

== Naming history ==
The river was first mentioned in 1360 as ylstere . The name probably originally came from the root word -aha meaning 'flowing water' and the Germanic determining word *elistr- meaning 'pasture'.

== Water course ==
The Ilster River rises east of Töpingen (a district of Munster ) and then flows north past "Haus Ilster" (part of the formerly independent municipality of Ilster , now also a district of Munster). It crosses County Road 49 and is captured in a reservoir. Shortly thereafter, it flows into the Örtze River on the Munster-Nord military training area, north of Breloh (a district of Munster). The Ilster reaches a maximum width of two meters over its approximately five-kilometer length.

== Condition ==
The Ilster River is moderately polluted along its entire length (water quality class II).

== See also ==
- List of rivers of Lower Saxony
