= Kleine Örtze =

River in Germany

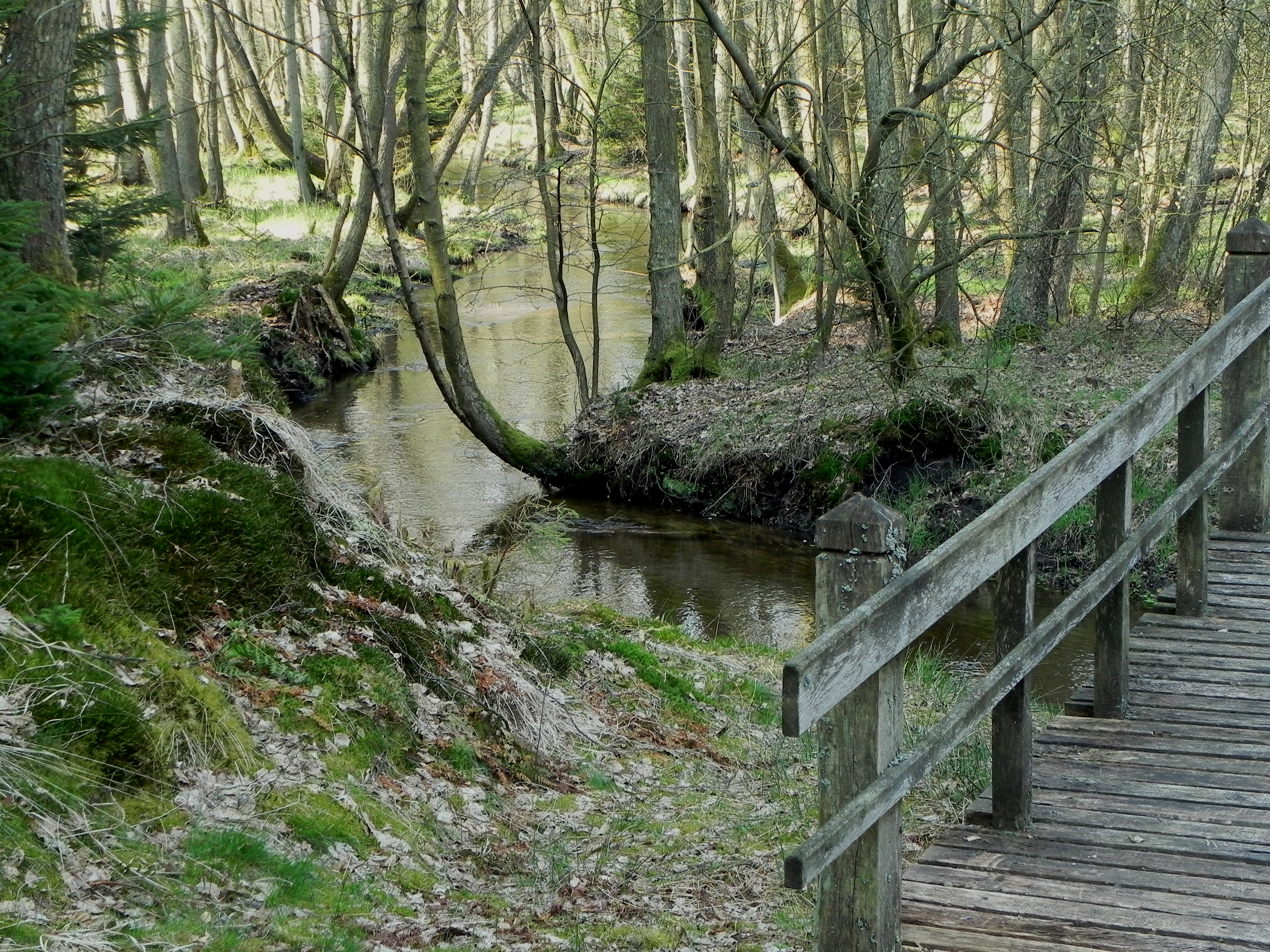

Location
- Country: Germany
- State: Lower Saxony

Physical characteristics
- Mouth
  - location: Örtze
  - coordinates: 52.9139°N 10.1236°E
- Length: 13.0 km (8.1 mi)

Basin features
- Progression: Örtze→ Aller→ Weser→ North Sea

Kleine Örtze is a river of Lower Saxony, Germany. It flows into the Örtze near Faßberg.

== See also ==
- List of rivers of Lower Saxony
