= Fassberg =

Fassberg or Faßberg may refer to

- Faßberg – a municipality in the district of Celle, in Lower Saxony, Germany
- RAF Fassberg – a Royal Air Force air base between 1945 and 1957 in the vicinity of Faßberg
- Faßberg Air Base – a German Army air base, successor to RAF Fassberg
