= Wietze (Örtze) =

River in Lower Saxony, Germany

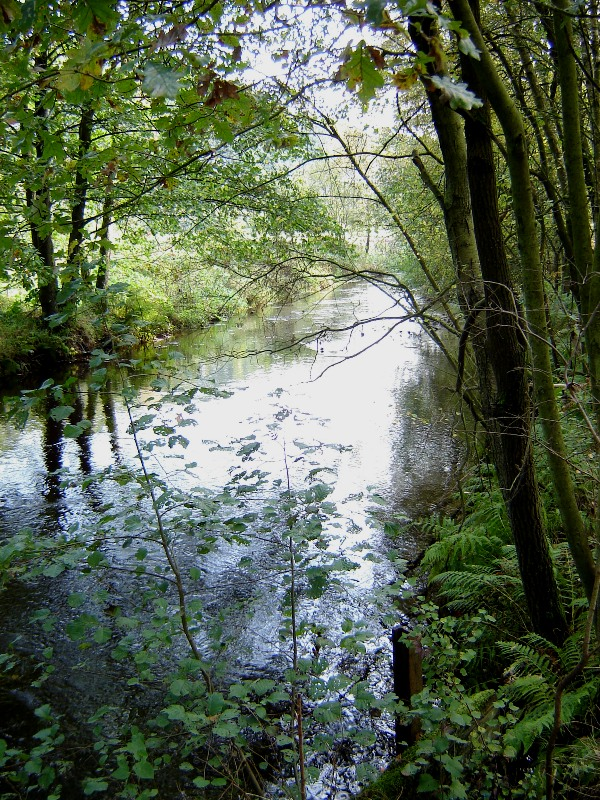
- The Wietze north of Müden

Location
- Country: Germany
- State: Lower Saxony

Physical characteristics
- Source
  - location: East of Moide (a district of Soltau), on the Mathberg (87.5 m or 287 ft)
  - coordinates: 52°59′28″N 9°57′33″E
  - elevation: 83 m (272 ft)
- Mouth
  - location: in Müden into the Örtze
  - coordinates: 52°52′21.8″N 10°6′49.5″E
  - elevation: 56 m (184 ft)
- Length: 25.5 km (15.8 mi)

Basin features
- Progression: Örtze→ Aller→ Weser→ North Sea
- Tributaries
  - left: Aue, Reininger Moorgraben
- Towns and villages: Wietzendorf, Reddingen, Müden

Wietze (German pronunciation: [ˈviːtsə]) is a river in the South Lüneburg Heath, in Lower Saxony, Germany, 25 kilometres (16 mi) long, a tributary of the Örtze.

The Wietze rises east of the Soltau suburb of Moide and flows from there in a southerly direction to Wietzendorf. Here it is joined by its largest tributary, the Aue. The Aue has two source streams: the Hötzinger Aue, which rises north of Stübeckshorn (a district of Soltau), 98 m above sea level and the Alvernsche Aue, that has its source northwest of Alvern (a district of Munster), 86 m above sea level. Beyond Wietzendorf the Wietze swings east, passes the village of Reddingen and flows through its attached hamlets of Halmern and Reiningen and past the Winterhoff farm. It then turns again towards the south and discharges into the Örtze at Müden.

The Wietze is a very clean river. It is water quality class II through (moderately polluted, betamesosaprob) Between Wietzendorf and Velligsen the river can be used by canoes. It is looked after by the Unterhaltungsverband Örtze which is based Faßberg.

== See also ==
- List of rivers of Lower Saxony
