= Wietze (disambiguation) =

Wietze is a municipality in Lower Saxony, Germany.

Wietze may also refer to:

- Wietze (Aller), a river of Lower Saxony, Germany, tributary of the Aller
- Wietze (Örtze), a river of Lower Saxony, Germany, tributary of the Örtze
