= Reddingen =

- Ortsteil of Wietzendorf
- Interactive map of Reddingen
- Location within Germany Location within Lower Saxony
- Coordinates: 52°54′41.29″N 10°00′52.46″E
- Country: Germany
- State: Lower Saxony
- District: Soltau-Fallingbostel
- Municipality: Wietzendorf
- Elevation: 72 m (236 ft)

Population (2021)
  - Total: 101
- Time zone: UTC+01:00 (CET)
  - Summer (DST): UTC+02:00 (CEST)
- Postal codes: 29649
- Dialling codes: 05196

Reddingen (German pronunciation: [ˈʁɛdɪŋən]) is a village in the municipality of Wietzendorf in Soltau-Fallingbostel district, Lower Saxony, Germany. The village, even with its associated hamlets of Reiningen and Halmern, only has 100 inhabitants. Formerly an independent municipality, it is part of Wietzendorf since 1974.

== Location ==
Reddingen lies on the Lüneburg Heath. The Wietze river flows through the settlement of Reiningen. The Munster South Training Area begins immediately north of the three villages and is closed to the public.

== Transport ==
The K 11 and K 38 district roads meet in the village. The VNN's bus line no. 352 runs through the villages.

By the Wietze in Reiningen is a water gauge and a hydrometric gauging station belonging to the NLWKN for gathering environmental data.

In Halmern, Reddingen and Reiningen there are no road names, just house numbers which the residents, postal staff, local suppliers and visitors have to get to know.

== Politics ==
The chair of the parish council (Ortsvorsteher) is Wilhelm Grünhagen.

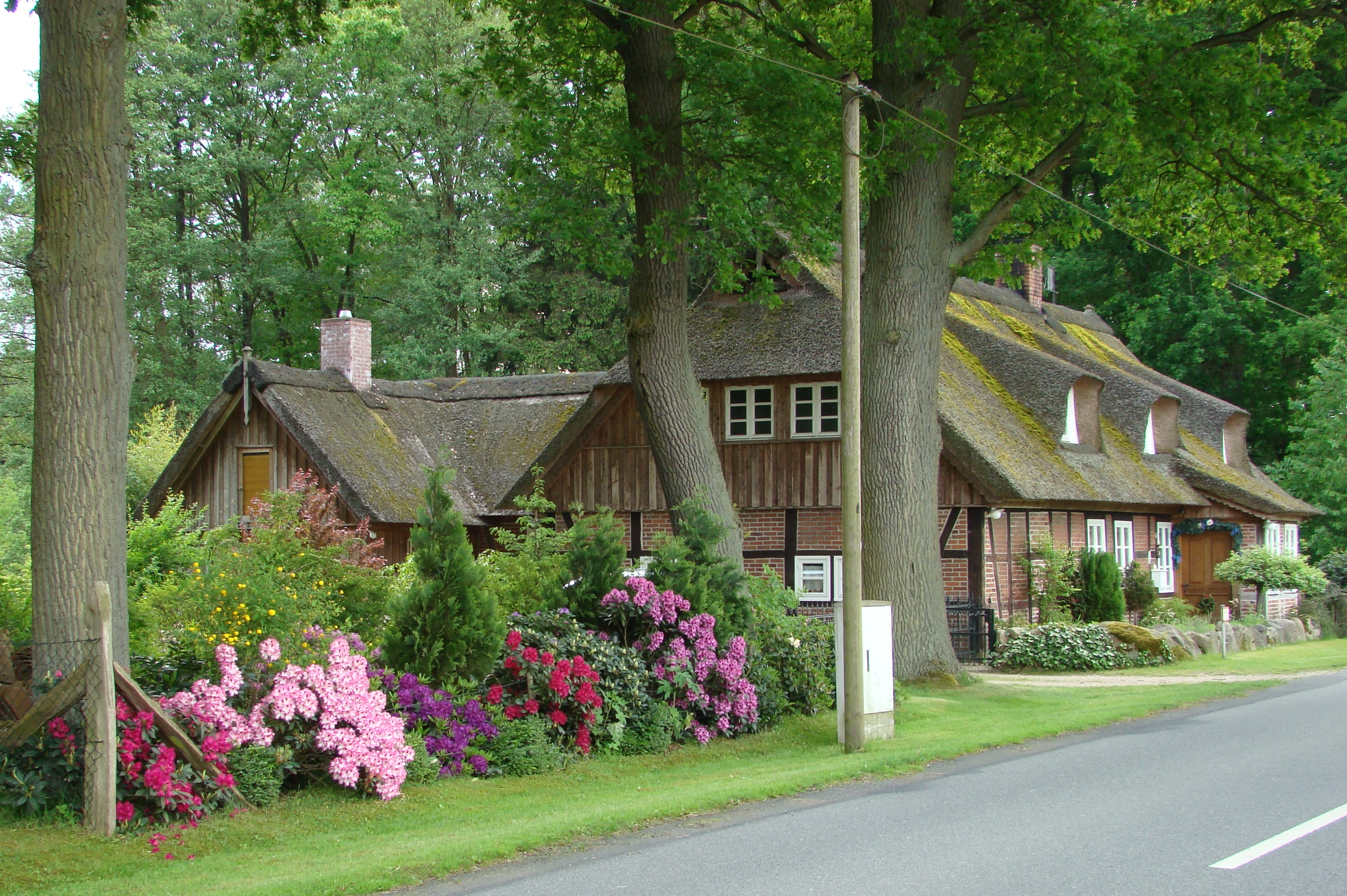
Reed-covered house in Reiningen, workshop for hand-made dolls

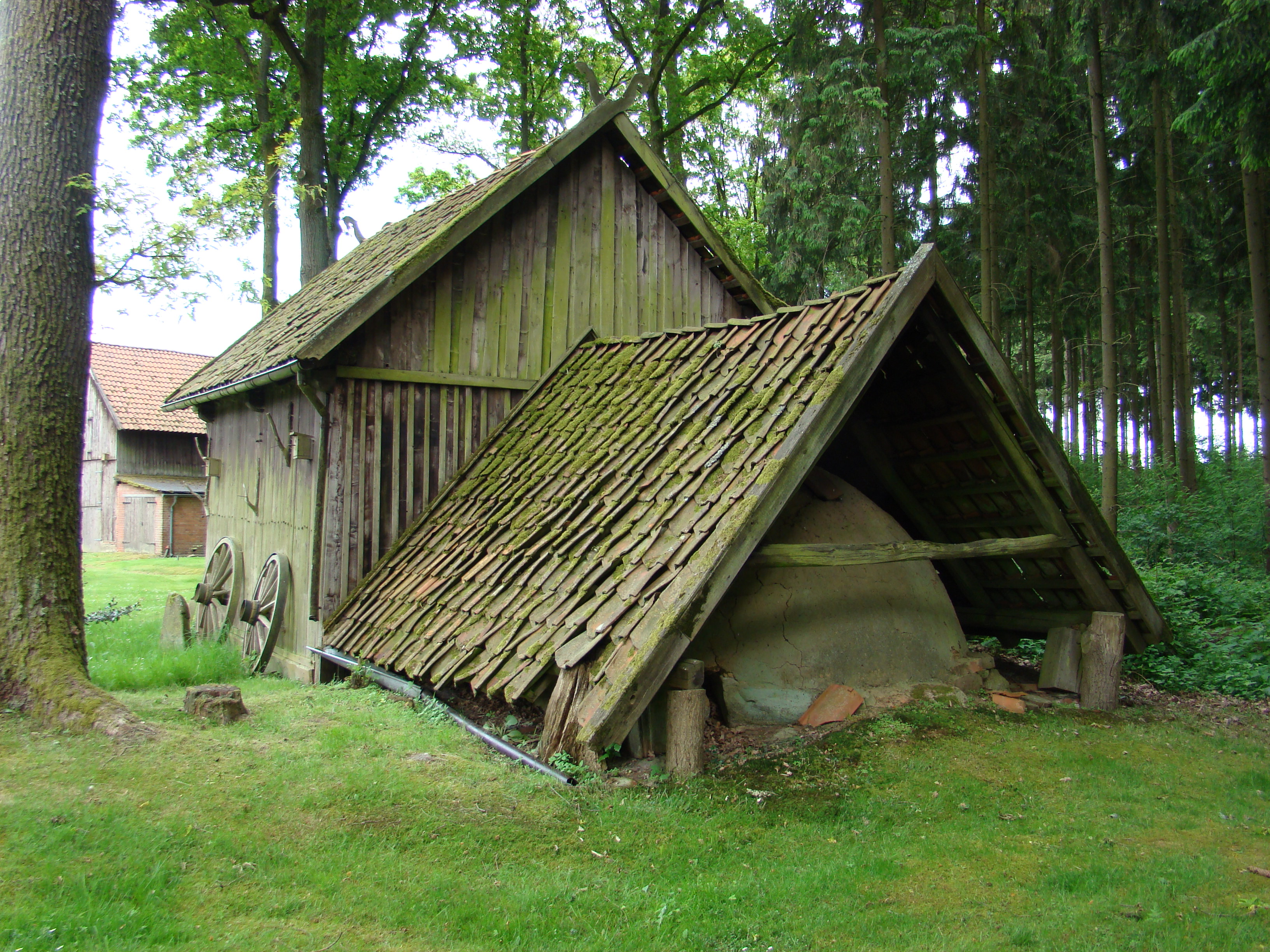
Historic clay oven in Reiningen

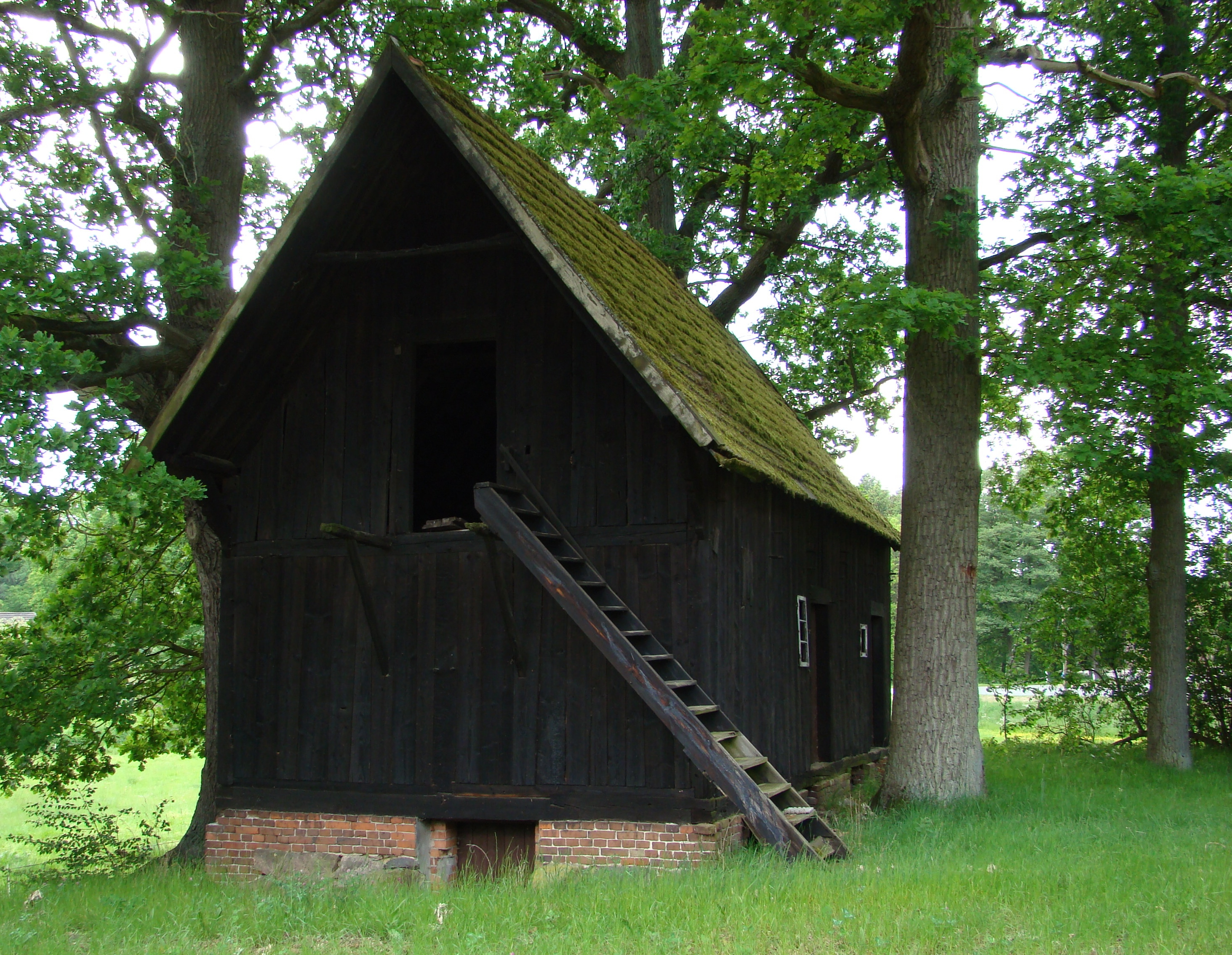
Old Treppenspeicher in Reiningen

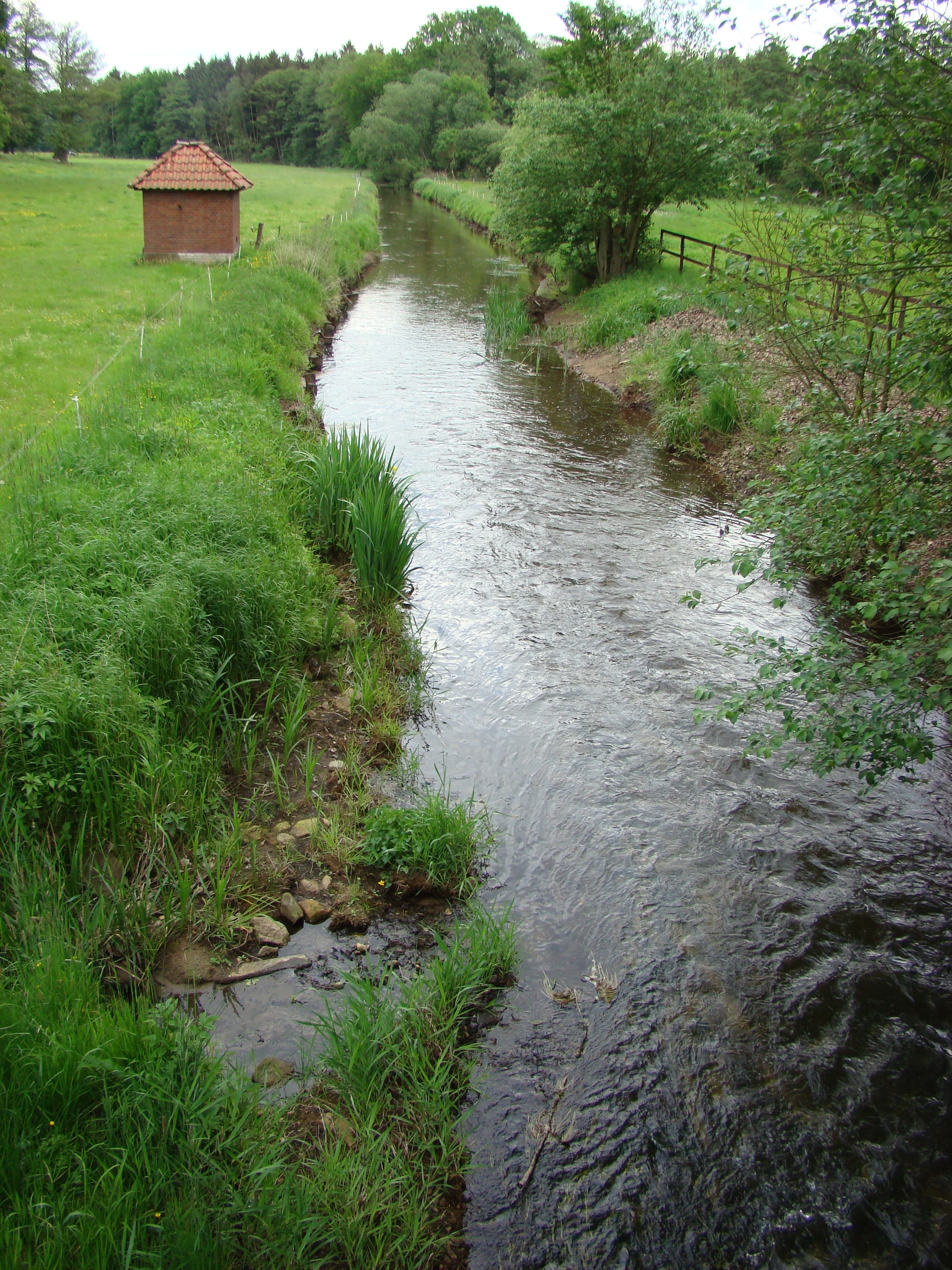
The Wietze in Reiningen
