= Faßberg =

- Municipality
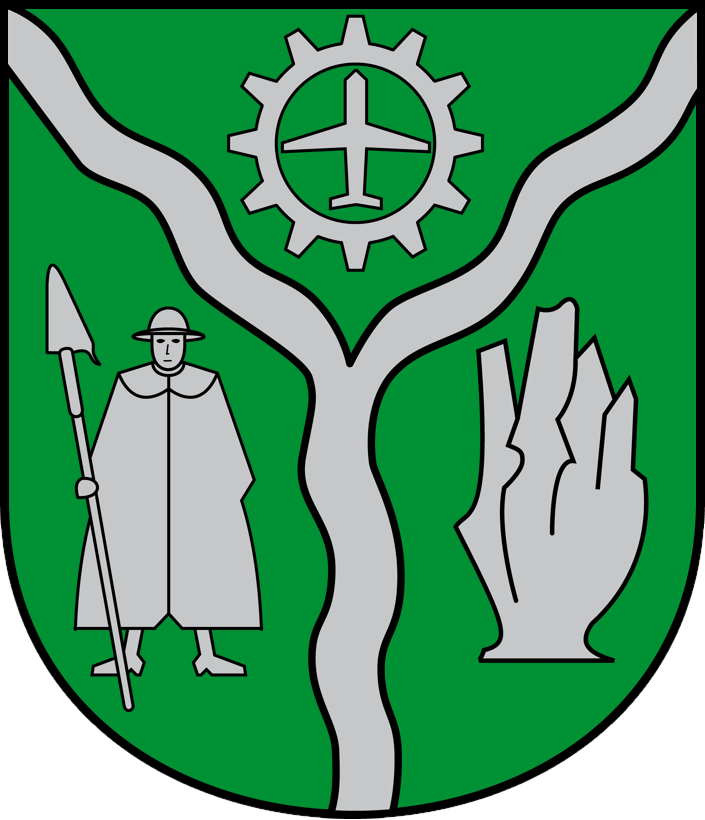
- Coat of arms

- Location of Faßberg within Celle district
- Interactive map of Faßberg
- Location within Germany Location within Lower Saxony
- Coordinates: 52°53′N 10°10′E
- Country: Germany
- State: Lower Saxony
- District: Celle
- Subdivisions: 4 districts

Government
  - Mayor (2021–26): Kerstin Speder

Area
  - Total: 102 km^{2} (39 sq mi)
- Elevation: 66 m (217 ft)

Population (2025-12-31)
  - Total: 5,889
  - Density: 57.7/km^{2} (150/sq mi)
- Time zone: UTC+01:00 (CET)
  - Summer (DST): UTC+02:00 (CEST)
- Postal codes: 29328
- Dialling codes: 05055
- Vehicle registration: CE
- Website: www.fassberg.de

Faßberg (ang. Fassberg) is a municipality in the district of Celle, in Lower Saxony, Germany. It is situated approximately 35 km north of Celle, and 30 km west of Uelzen.

== History ==
The pre-war history of Fassberg air base includes a number of interesting details and well-known names. From the spring of 1933, not only airfields and planes were built for the German Air Force, numerous training centres were also created, and in the first years, because of the Versailles Treaty, they were called by names that veiled their real purpose.

== Climate ==
Faßberg has an oceanic climate (Köppen: Cfb; Trewartha: Dobk).

Climate data for Faßberg, 1991–2020 normals
Month	Jan	Feb	Mar	Apr	May	Jun	Jul	Aug	Sep	Oct	Nov	Dec	Year
Daily mean °C (°F)	1.2 (34.2)	1.6 (34.9)	4.2 (39.6)	8.7 (47.7)	12.9 (55.2)	16.4 (61.5)	18.1 (64.6)	17.8 (64.0)	13.6 (56.5)	9.5 (49.1)	5.3 (41.5)	2.5 (36.5)	9.3 (48.7)
Average precipitation mm (inches)	62.0 (2.44)	49.9 (1.96)	51.1 (2.01)	39.5 (1.56)	55.8 (2.20)	66.6 (2.62)	77.4 (3.05)	62.7 (2.47)	61.0 (2.40)	63.4 (2.50)	56.7 (2.23)	58.7 (2.31)	704.8 (27.75)
Average extreme snow depth cm (inches)	7.6 (3.0)	6.2 (2.4)	3.4 (1.3)	0.4 (0.2)	0 (0)	0 (0)	0 (0)	0 (0)	0 (0)	0 (0)	1.4 (0.6)	4.9 (1.9)	10.6 (4.2)
Average precipitation days (≥ 0.1 mm)	17.7	15.1	14.2	12.6	13.1	13.4	16.1	13.9	13.6	16.5	17.6	17.9	181.5
Average relative humidity (%)	88.3	82.8	77.0	68.7	69.3	69.0	71.0	72.3	78.5	84.5	88.8	89.0	78.3
Mean monthly sunshine hours	26.8	58.9	95.7	148.1	160.7	156.5	182.2	163.3	128.9	60.2	37.2	21.1	1,239.4
Source: Deutscher Wetterdienst/SKlima.de

== Places of interest ==
- Historic village centre of Müden (Örtze)
- Berlin Airlift memorial
- St. Laurentius church
- Treppenspeicher barns from the 18th and 19th centuries
- Old village square with its old smithy with Sod and Wippe
- Old cemetery with the graves of poet Felicitas Rose and artist Fritz Flebbe
- Former residence of the heath poet Felicitas Rose
- Hermann Löns memorial plaque on house at Salzmoor 2a
- Heath farmsteads with Treppenspeicher barns in Schmarbeck and Oberohe
- Löns Stone with area of heathland on the Wietzer Berg (towards Hermannsburg on the L214 state road)
- Haußelberg with large areas of heath near Gerdehus
- Juniper wood and shattered glacial erratic boulders in the heathland of Schmarbeck
- Kiehnmoor nature reserve near Schmarbeck
- Historic water mill in Müden (now a tourist office, bookshop and marriage office)
- Deer park and adventurous climbing park in Heuweg in Müden (Örtze)
- German Aerospace Center Trauen Institute of Propulsion Technology, Engine / Fire Safety (Abt. Triebwerk, Gruppe Brandschutz)
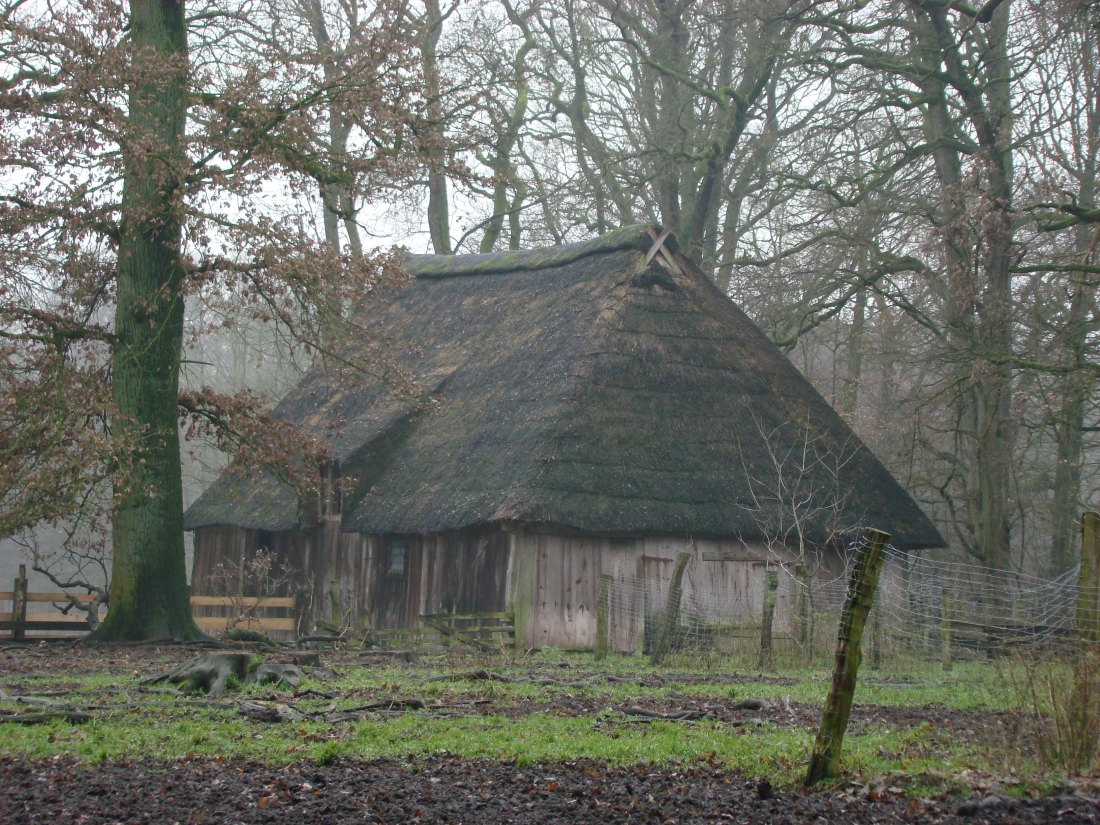
Heidschnucke sheep shed in Niederohe

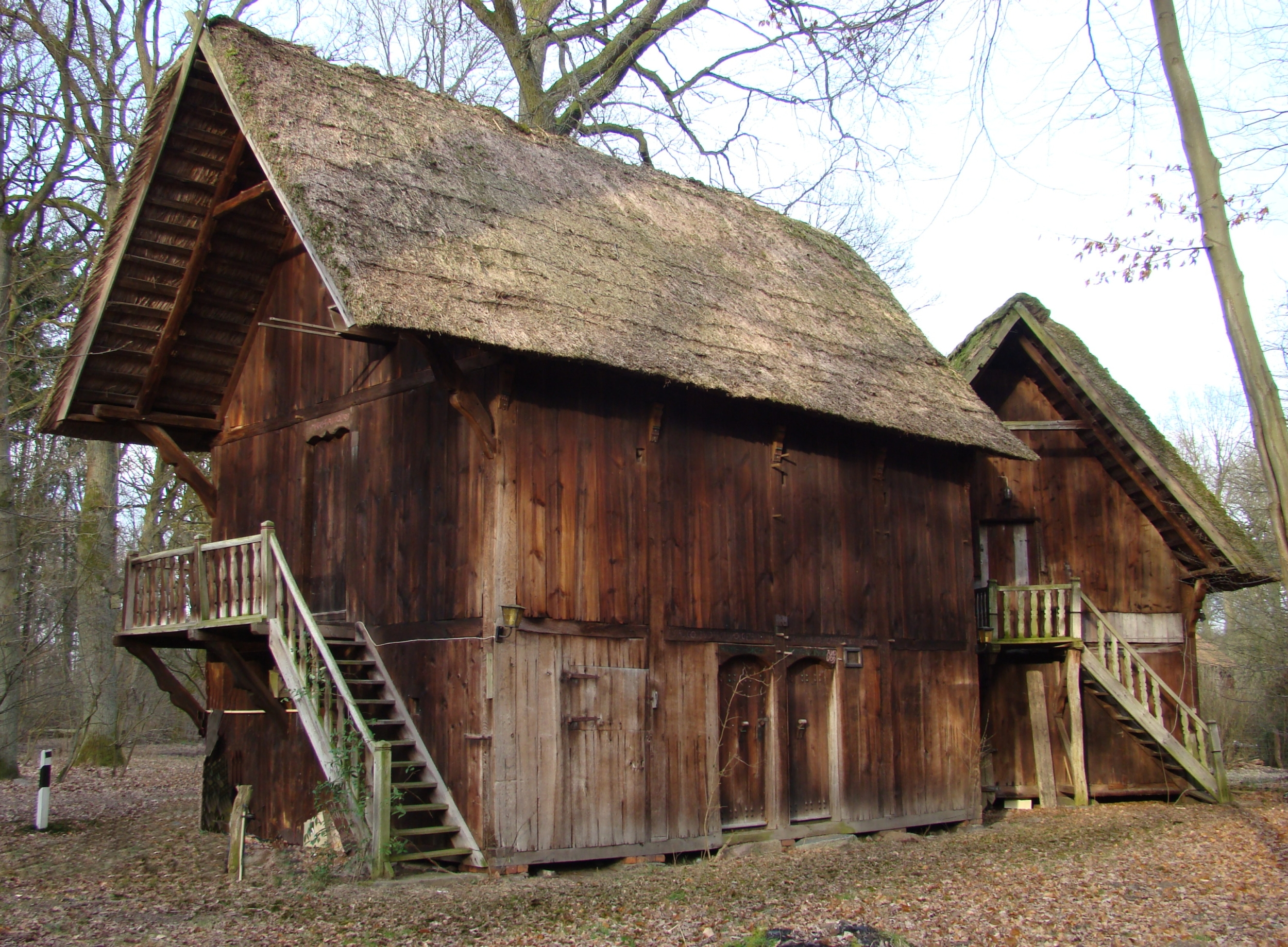
Treppenspeicher barn on the Hof v. d. Ohe farm at Oberohe

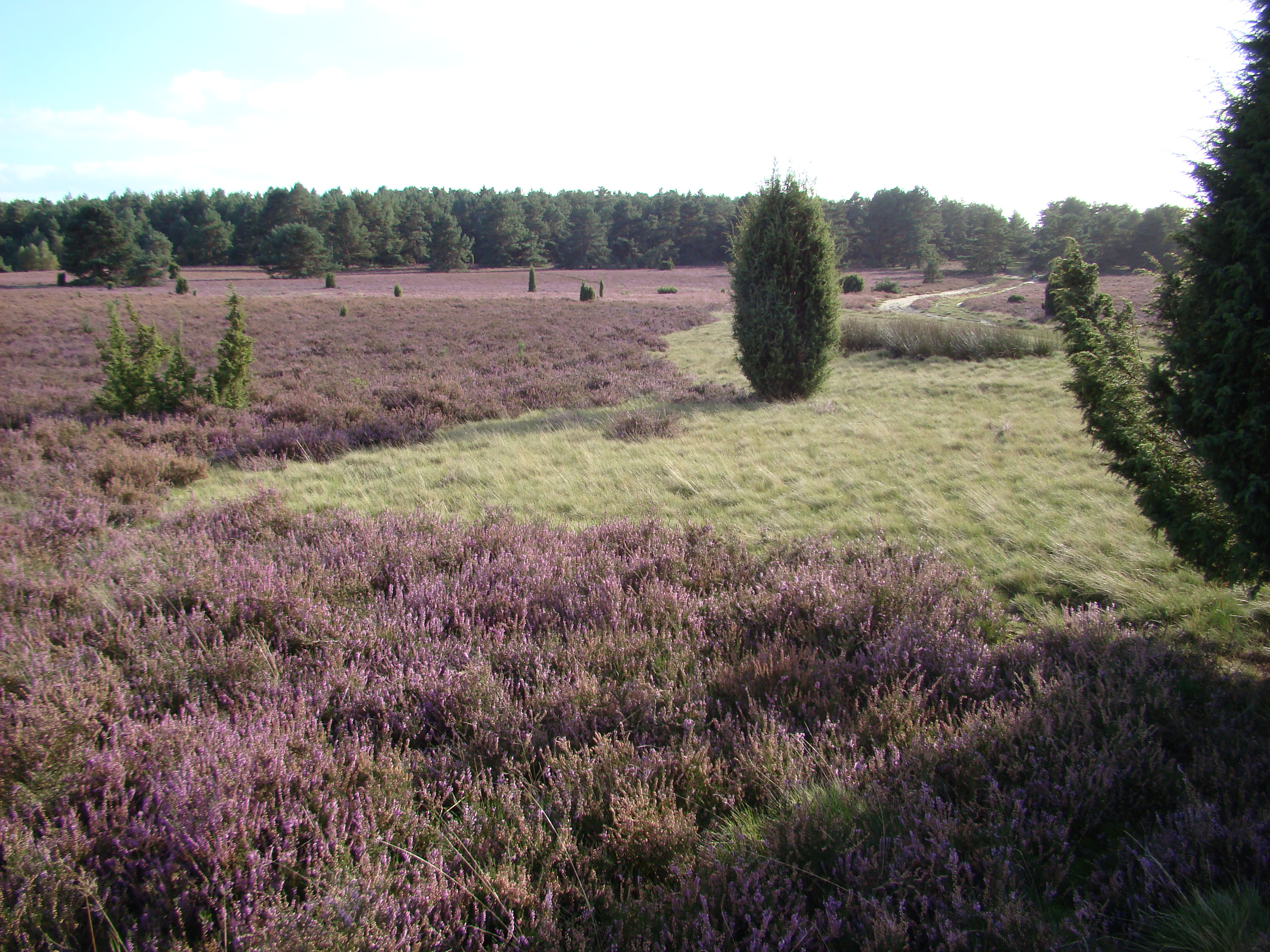
Heathland near Haußelberg

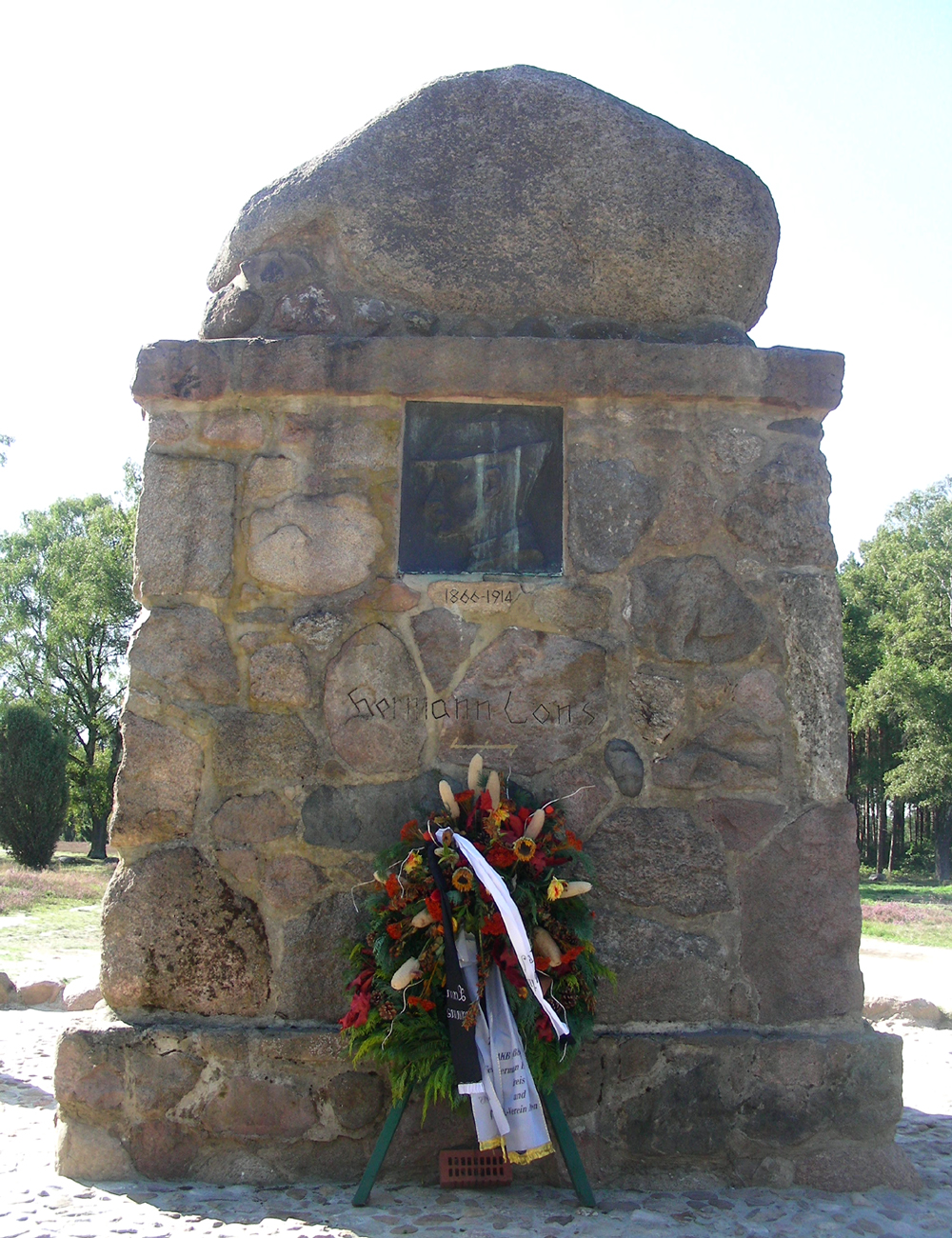
The Löns Stone on the Wietzer Berg

== Bibliography ==
- Matthias Blazek: Die geheime Großbaustelle in der Heide – Faßberg und sein Fliegerhorst 1933–2013. Ibidem, Stuttgart 2013, ISBN 978-3-95538-017-5.
- Michael Ende, Peter Müller, Urs Müller: Celle – Stadt und Landkreis. Medien-Verlag Schubert, Hamburg 2007, ISBN 978-3-937843-11-7.
- Christoph M. Glombek: Chronik der Gemeinde Faßberg mit den Ortschaften Müden/Örtze, Poitzen und Schmarbeck. Faßberg 2002.
- Hans Stärk: Geschichte von Faßberg. Faßberg 1971.
- Faßberg – Luft- und Raumfahrt in der Heide. Magazine for the AeroSpaceDay Faßberg, edited by the municipality of Faßberg, Faßberg 2013, ISBN 978-3-00-042877-7.
