= Wietzer Berg =

Hill on the Lüneburg Heath in Germany

Coordinates: 52°52′N 10°05′E

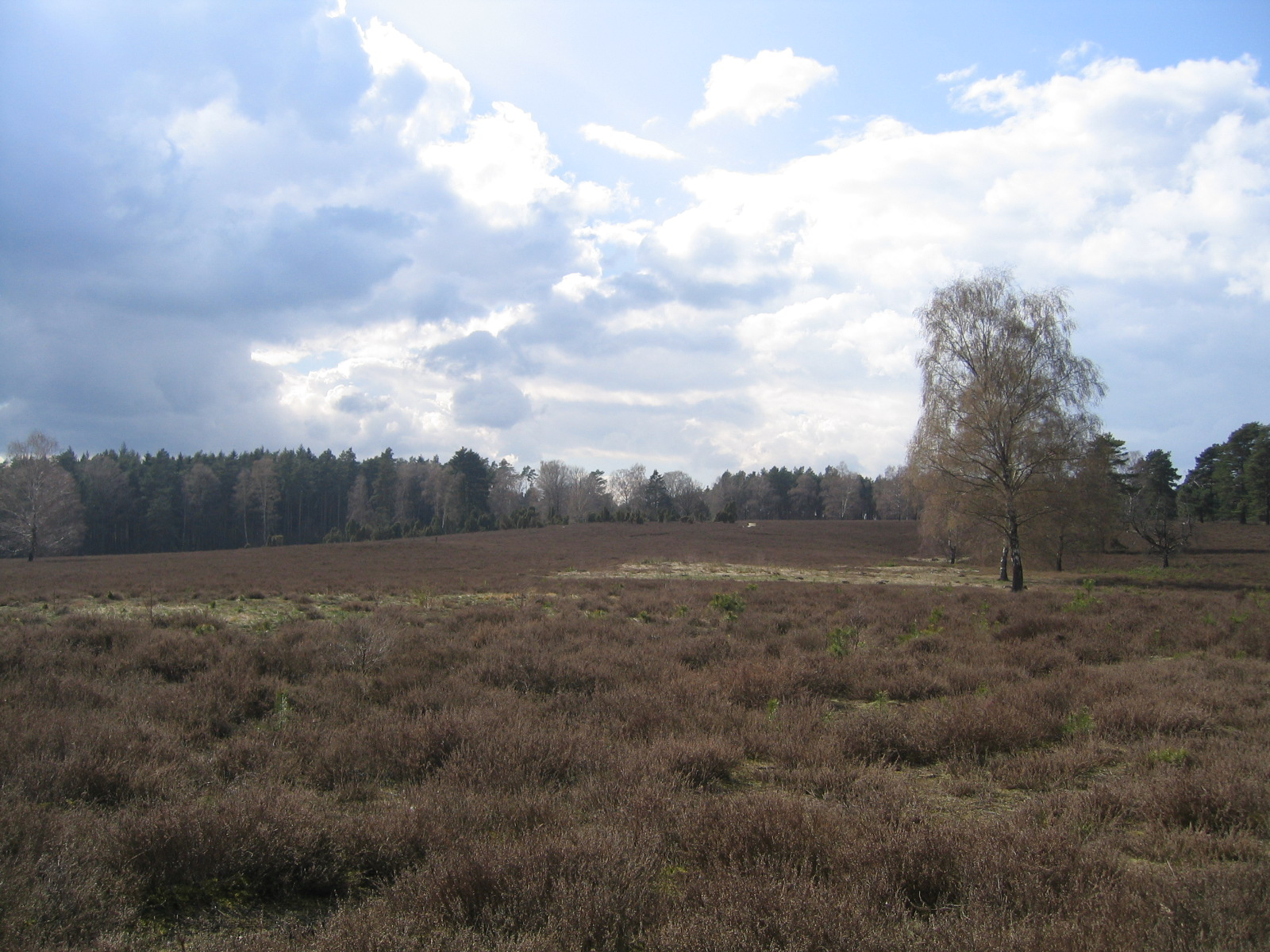
The Wietzer Berg

The Wietzer Berg is a low hill, 102 metres above sea level, on the Lüneburg Heath in the north German district of Celle. It lies about 2 kilometres west-southwest of the tourist village of Müden (Örtze) and is a popular destination in the generally flat landscape of the Südheide Nature Park. On its summit in an area of heathland is the Lönsstein monument, which commemorates the heath poet, Hermann Löns. There is a car park and information board on the nearby district road (Landstraße) about 600m from the summit. A flock of some 30 moorland sheep, or Heidschnucken, symbolic of the heath, is kept in an enclosure near the hilltop as a tourist attraction.
