= Müden (Örtze) =

Müden/Örtze
- Ortsteil of Faßberg
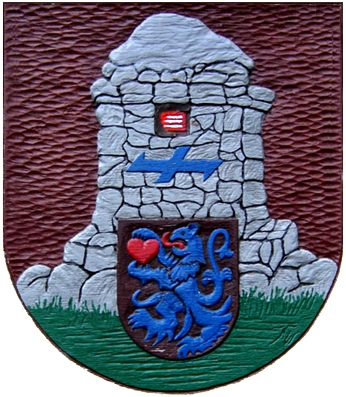
- Coat of arms
- Interactive map of Müden/Örtze
- Location within Germany Location within Lower Saxony
- Coordinates: 52°52′36″N 10°07′10″E
- Country: Germany
- State: Lower Saxony
- District: Celle
- Municipality: Faßberg
- Elevation: 55–65 m (180–213 ft)

Population
  - Total: 2,200
- Time zone: UTC+01:00 (CET)
  - Summer (DST): UTC+02:00 (CEST)
- Postal codes: 29328
- Dialling codes: 05053

Müden (German pronunciation: [ˈmyːdn̩]) is a village in the municipality of Faßberg in the southern part of the Lüneburg Heath in the German state of Lower Saxony.

The village, which is situated in the district of Celle has around 2220 inhabitants and is a very popular tourist centre, whose catchment area includes Hamburg, Bremen and Hanover. It is surrounded by large tracts of forest and heathland. The nearest big towns are Lüneburg (60 km north), Soltau (30 km west), Uelzen (45 km east) and Celle (32 km south). The two rivers, the Wietze and the Örtze merge in Müden.

== History ==
=== Middle Ages ===
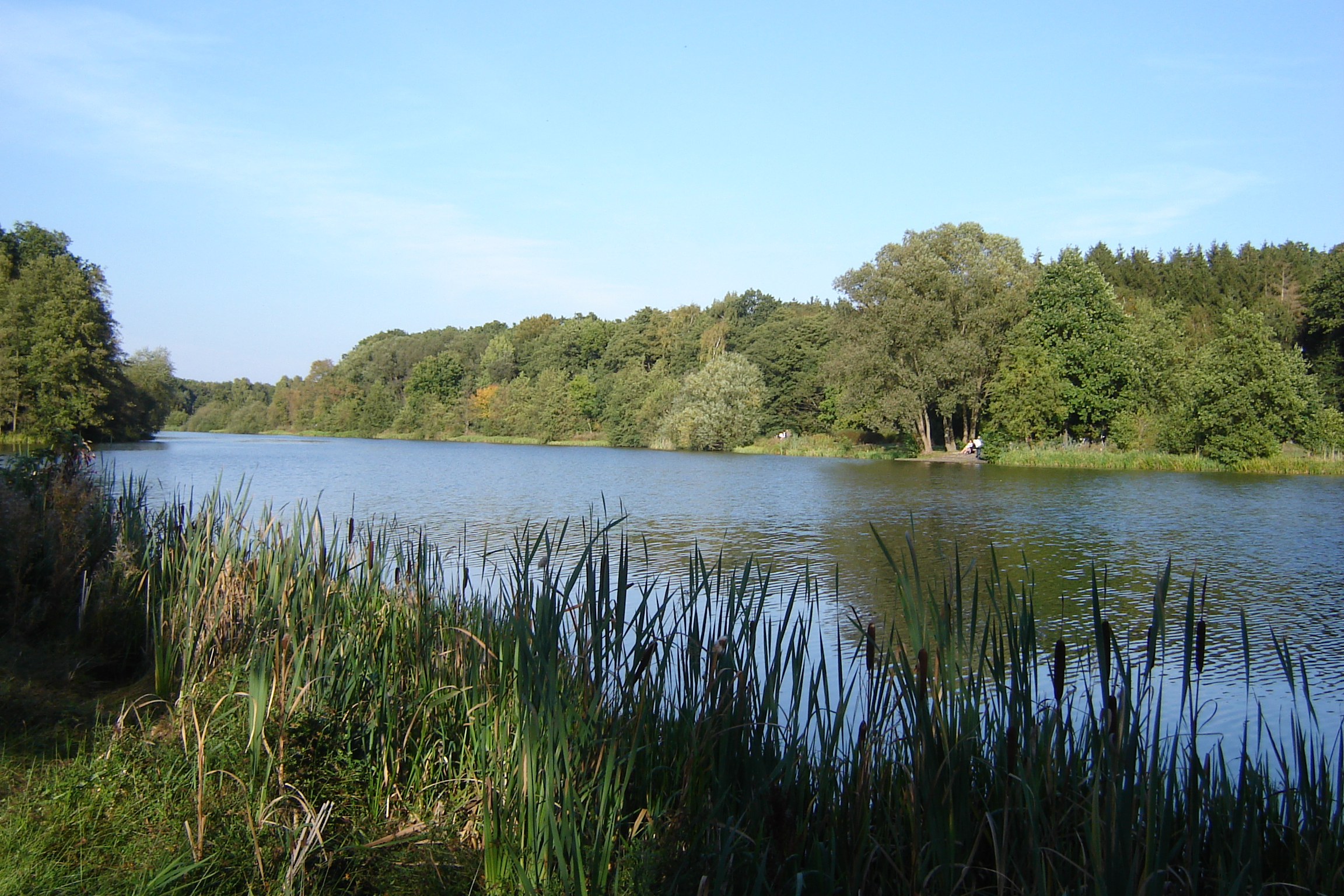
The Heidesee lake. View of the eastern shore

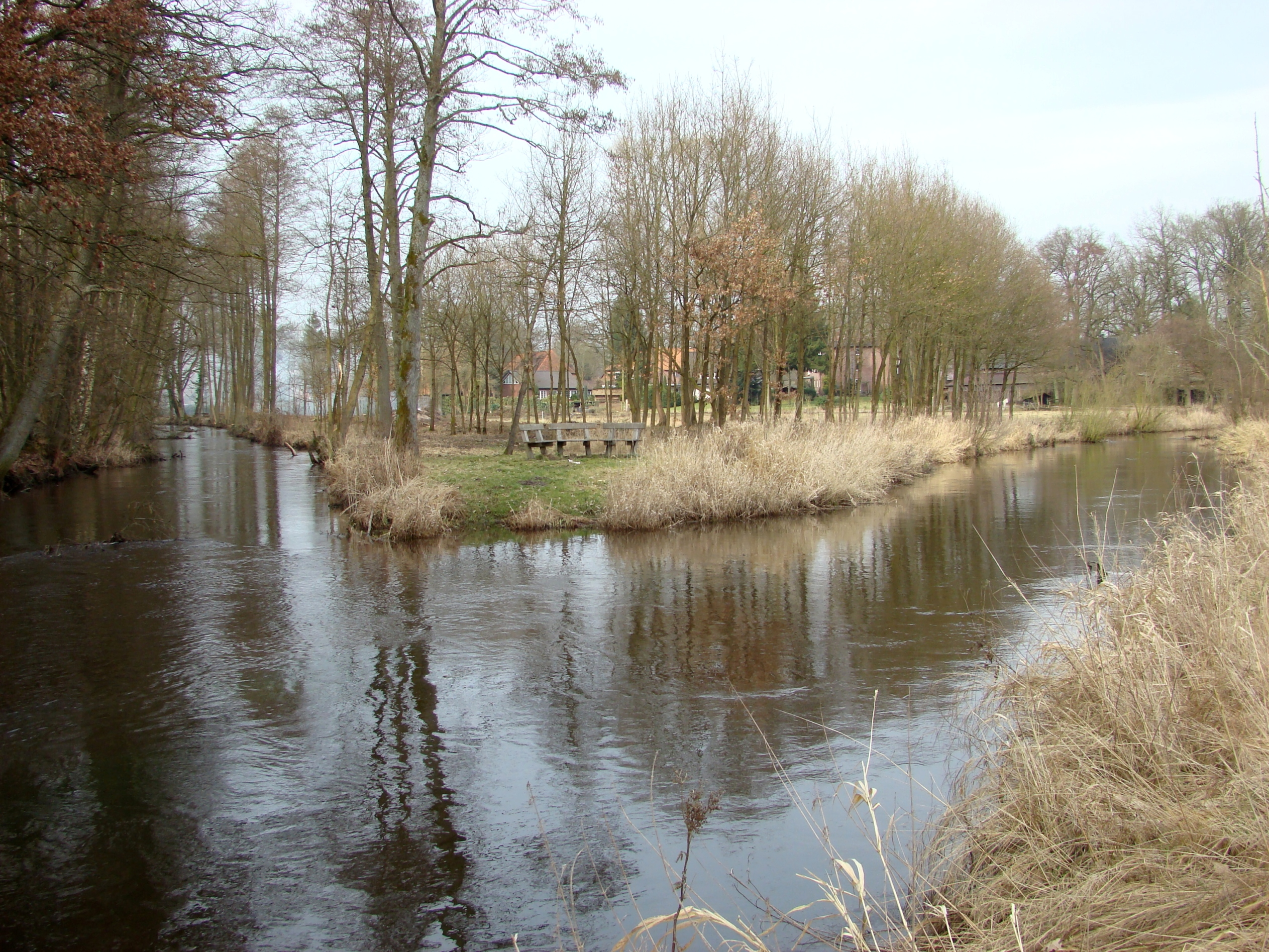
Confluence of the Wietze (left) and Örtze

The great Hermannsburg pastor, revivalist and local historian, Ludwig Harms, believed there to be a shrine to the god, Thor at the confluence of the Wietze and Örtze rivers that, according to Müden historian Ernst Schütze, still existed around AD 800. In any case the Christianity had reached the area by the end of the 8th century and, according to Harms, there was already a wooden church in Müden in 866. The earliest written record of the village goes back to the year 1022. In the deed of gift by the Bishop of Hildesheim, Bernward, dated 1 November 1022 for the abbey of St. Michael in Hildesheim is the following statement: item Mutha in pago Muthiwide ("likewise Müden in the sub-district (Untergau) of Mündungswald"). Muthiwide, the Latinized form of the Old Saxon term Muthiwiddi (Muth = mouth) refers to the name of a sub-district in the Loingau. Gaus were established during the reign of Charlemagne around 793 as regional administrative units. The settlement of Müden was located on the border of the Loingau, which stretched from the area around the lower Leine river to the Sothriet, Rodau and Örtze, and had a northern border with the Bardengau. Until the middle of the 15th century the history of Müden was linked to the neighbouring village of Hermannsburg, with which it formed a common parish until 1440. The region was ruled by the House of Billung until the line died out, it then went over to the Guelphs and until 1866 belonged to the House of Hanover. The Reformation was introduced into Müden in 1530 by order of Ernest the Confessor. The population at that time was 119.

=== Early modern period ===
Little is known about the damage caused in Müden by the Thirty Years War. From parish bills during the years 1638 to 1650 it can however be deduced that there was destruction and plundering, because damage to the church had to be repaired and new communion items procured. In addition, the largest church bell was cracked and had to be recast.

In 1839, on the introduction of land reforms in the Kingdom of Hanover, it became possible for the Müden farmers to release themselves from their manorial duties. To do that they had to pay twenty-five times the annual tax as a release fee. Only the Müllerhof and the Martenshof were able to raise this themselves, the other farms had to continue to pay manorial dues for a long time thereafter. However this did not affect the expansion of the village. The number of inhabitants grew steadily: in 1821 there were 333, in 1890, 580. In 1852 the cemetery around the church, where there were already up to five graves layered one above the other, was closed and a new one laid out north of the village.

The Kingdom of Hanover had become a Prussian province in 1866, and Müden became part of the district of Celle following the district reforms of 1885. At the same time there began a gradual change in emphasis away from a pure farming village into a summer retreat. Tourism was promoted by the narratives of the writer Hermann Löns and Richard Linde, who also drew other authors like Felicitas Rose and Diedrich Speckmann as well as the painter Fritz Flebbe to Müden. Rose and Flebbe are buried in Müden. In 1889 the Gasthof zur Post inn was opened, which grew into a busy hotel in the years that followed (today's Posthotel). Another boost for tourism was the opening of the Kleinbahn railway from Celle to Munster on 23 April 1910, with a station at Müden, together with the junction to Hanover. In 1913 the electrification of the village began.

=== Later modern period ===
For Müden the First World War saw the arrival of refugees from East Prussia, the billeting of the 78th Infantry Regiment and the quartering of French and Belgian prisoners-of-war. At the end of the war, Müden itself had lost 22 soldiers. In the interwar years, tourism again became important. The number of inhabitants continued to grow and reached 822 in 1928. In 1938 the registered population was 1,162. In 1931 a youth hostel was opened; whose original Bauhaus style was heavily contested. From 1940 the youth hostel had to act as a military hospital.

From 1944 the Müden population endured frequent air raid alarms, in response to British bombers attacking the nearby airfield at Faßberg. On 14 April 1945 British troops advanced towards the bridges over the Örtze. When a German detachment blew up the bridge over the Wietze in front of them, British tanks that were already in the area opened fire on the village, setting alight and destroying several houses. Not until 1949 was the last damage repaired. As a result of accepting refugees from Germany's eastern territories the number of villagers had grown by 1946 to 1,746. In 1949 new streets were laid out for Müden's new citizens. In 1954, a larger cemetery was laid out on the eastern edge of the village. In 1965 the corn mill and sawmill were closed and, in 1993, the buildings were turned into a tourist and cultural centre. In order to improve the attraction of Müden, a deer park was established in 1971 and, in 1976, the Örtze was partially diverted to create an artificial lake, the Heidesee (Heath Lake). It covers an area of 6.5 hectares (16 acres) and is used for sailing, angling and walking. With its concentration on tourism, the character of the village had completely changed inside 60 years: in 1995 there were only four agricultural concerns left in the village. Today the place advertises itself as the "Pearl of the Südheide".

In 1973 Müden was absorbed into the collective municipality of Faßberg and, on 1 January 1977 became fully incorporated into the new Faßberg municipality. The last Bürgermeister of Müden was Günther H. Wilmsen, who held office from 1973 to 1976.

=== Economy ===
==== Farming ====
At the beginning of the 11th century the first agricultural farmsteads appeared at the confluence of the Wietze and Örtze, such as the Müllerhof, the Martenshof and the Renkenhof, which still exist today near the church, albeit fulfilling different roles (inter alia the Hotel Bauernwald). Müden had its first chapel in 1185, although it belonged to Hermannsburg. Construction on the Church of St. Lawrence started in 1189 and it was completed in 1217. Not until 1444 was the parish finally separated from Hermannsburg and the village was given its own priest.

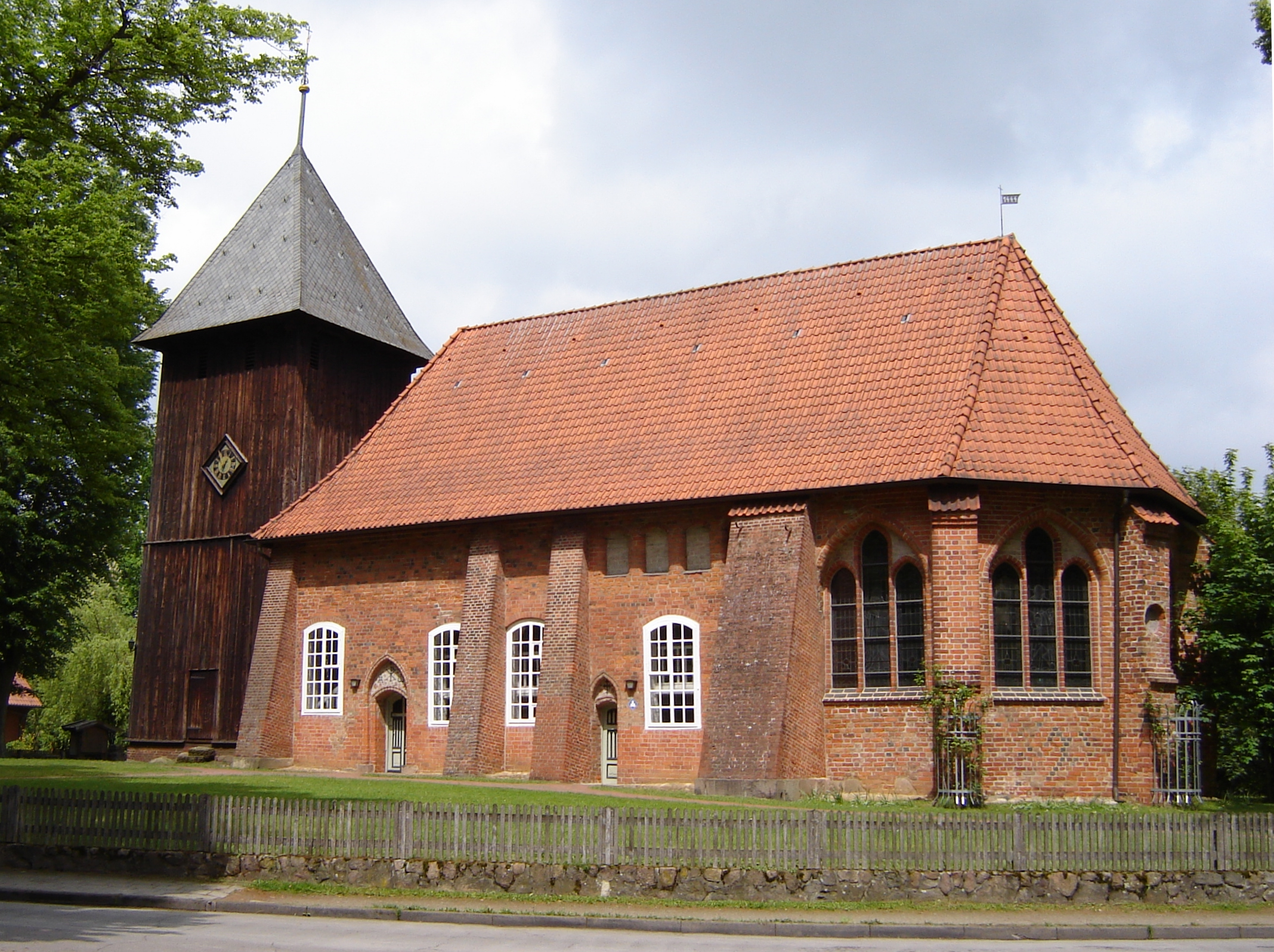
St. Lawrence Church

For the year 1589 we have the first reliable report about the farmsteads in Müden thanks to a tax list, the so-called Schatzregister (treasury register). This recorded that, at that time, there were six full and two half farmsteads and five so-called Kotenhöfe or cottages. Their owners had 483 sheep, 254 cattle, 92 pigs and 24 horses between them. Almost every farm also had one or more beehives. But the tax record of 1589 says nothing about the farmers' land; the first information about that appears in 1770. By then, there were twelve farms with a total of 151 hectares (370 acres) of land, the Müllerhof with 22 hectares (54 acres) owning the largest acreage. The keeping of moorland sheep (Heidschnucken), typical of the region, had expanded in almost 200 years to 1,040 animals. In the years that followed, agriculture continued to be important. In 1867 there were 28 farms, but numbers reached a zenith in 1936 with 98 farms.

==== Log rafting ====
In addition to agriculture, log rafting was also carried out on the River Örtze until 1912. Trees were felled in the nearby forests; the logs were tied together into rafts and transported downriver via the Aller to Bremen. At its peak in the last quarter of the 19th century almost 2,000 timber rafts were floated downriver each year.

==== Mills ====
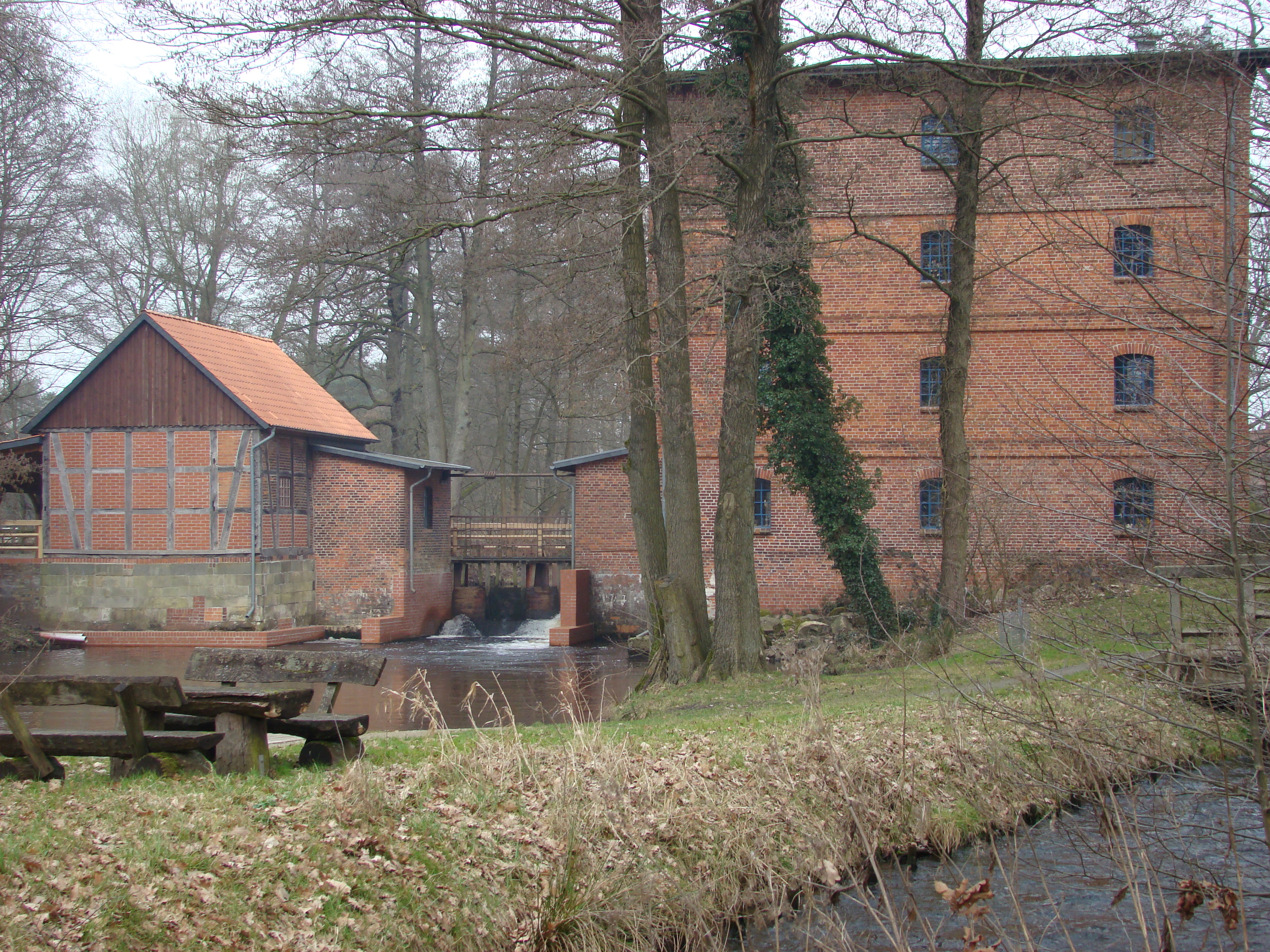
Former mill in Müden, with a turbine house (left) and fish bypass (front)

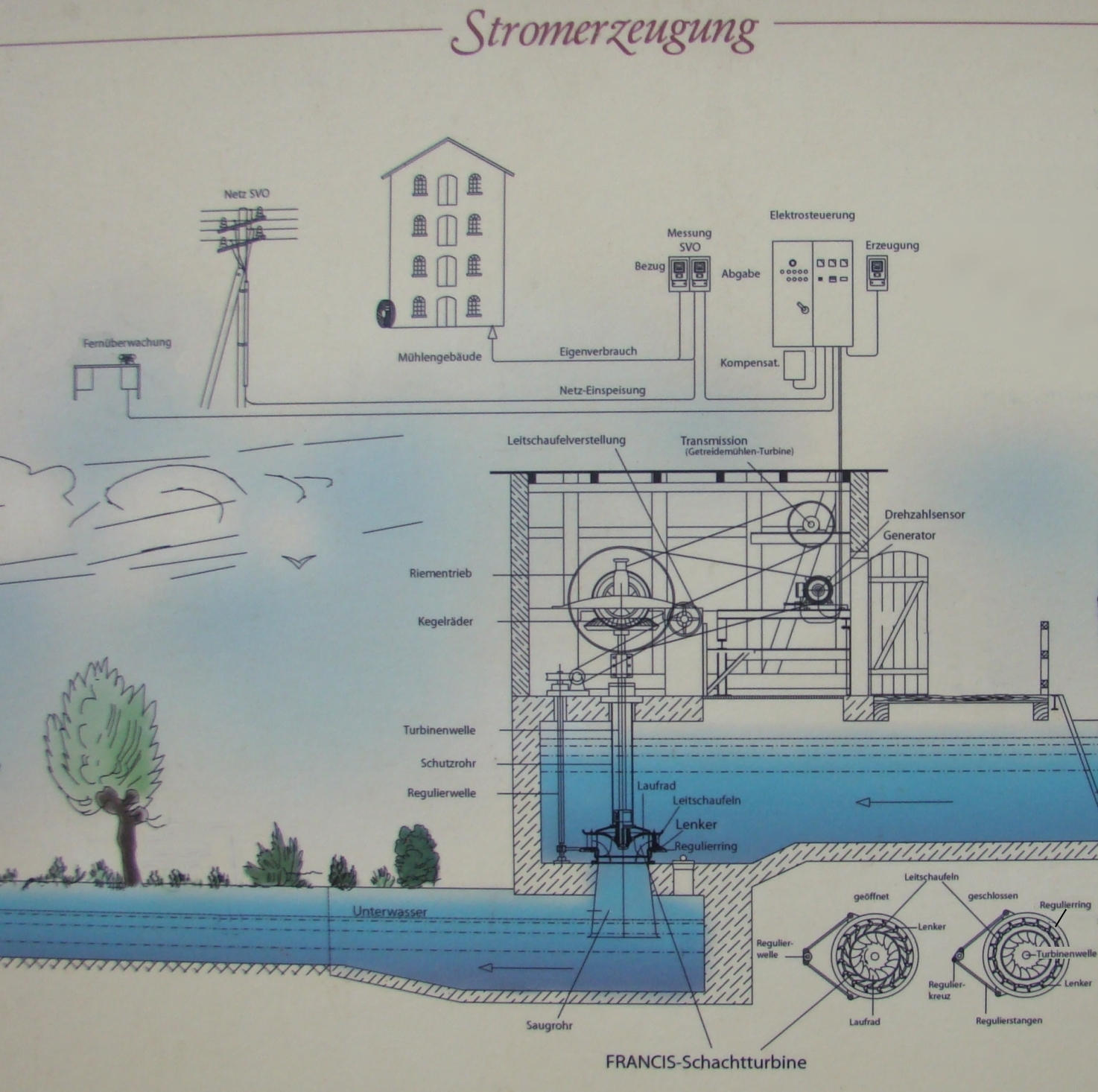
Display board on the working principle of electricity generation using a Francis shaft turbine

From the records it is known that there was already a corn mill on the Örtze in 1438, which was driven by water power. In 1465 Ole Müller, owner of the Müllerhof was awarded royal mill rights by the Duke of Brunswick-Lüneburg. Around 1621 a mill was built on the spot where today the mill building dating to 1913 now stands. The mill was in service until 1973. From 1993 to 1997 the building was renovated and, today, it houses the tourist information bureau, a bookshop, a wedding room and exhibition rooms.

In an outbuilding there are two Francis shaft turbines for the generation of electricity. One turbine is still in operation and has an output of 7 kW. Until 1959 electricity was generated to operate the grain mill. Today it is primarily used to supply the mill building. The superfluous electricity is fed into the public electricity network. A near-natural fishway has been laid to bypass the weir.

==== Other trades ====
From the middle of the 18th century the farms in the village employed many tradesmen, such as coopers, smiths, carpenters and shoemakers, in order to be able to use their services more cheaply than by using craftsmen from outside the village.

== Local politics ==
According to Lower Saxony's municipal regulations, villages that are part of another village's municipality must choose either to elect representatives (Ortsräte) on the municipal council or to nominate a local parish council leader (Ortsvorsteher) for the duration of the voting period. The parish of Faßberg has decided that the villages should elect their own parish council leaders. Since 1977 Müden has elected the following leaders:

- 1977–1989 Günther H. Wilmsen
- 1989–2006 master painter Otto Schaper
- November 2006 – present regular officer Volker Nickel

== Sights ==
Each year, on the second Thursday in July, the moorland sheep (Heidschnucke) auction takes place. The strongest young rams are presented to the breeders and spectators and the best animals win prizes. The Heidschnucke rams can be bid for at the accompanying auction.

On the second Sunday in September a mill festival (Mühlenfest) is held at the old mill.

North of the village there is a natural monument, an ancient oak, known as the Hillige Eeke (holy oak), which is over 600 years old. It was probably used as a Gerichtsbaum, a tree under which regular court sessions were held.

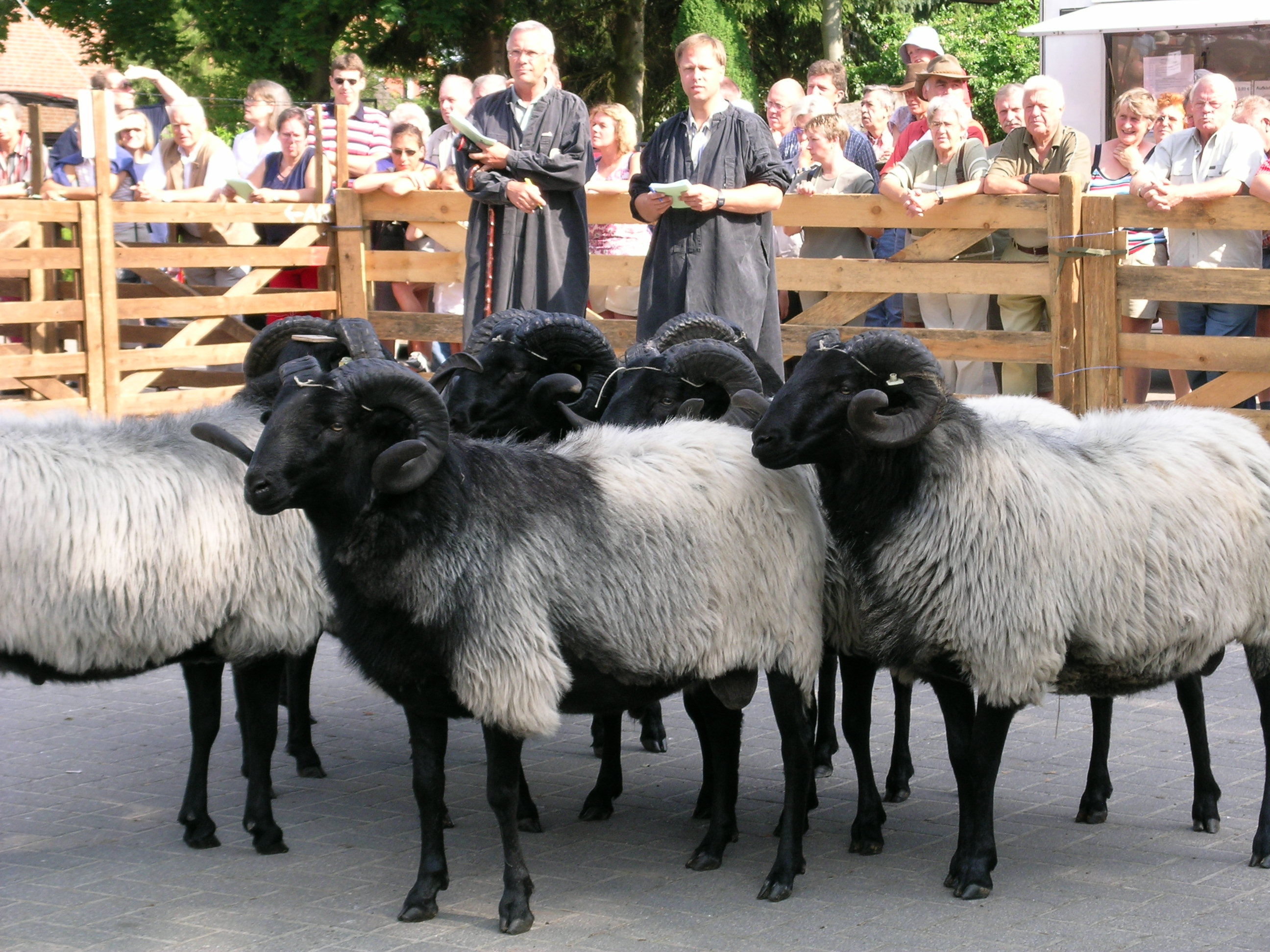
The Heidschucke rams are assessed

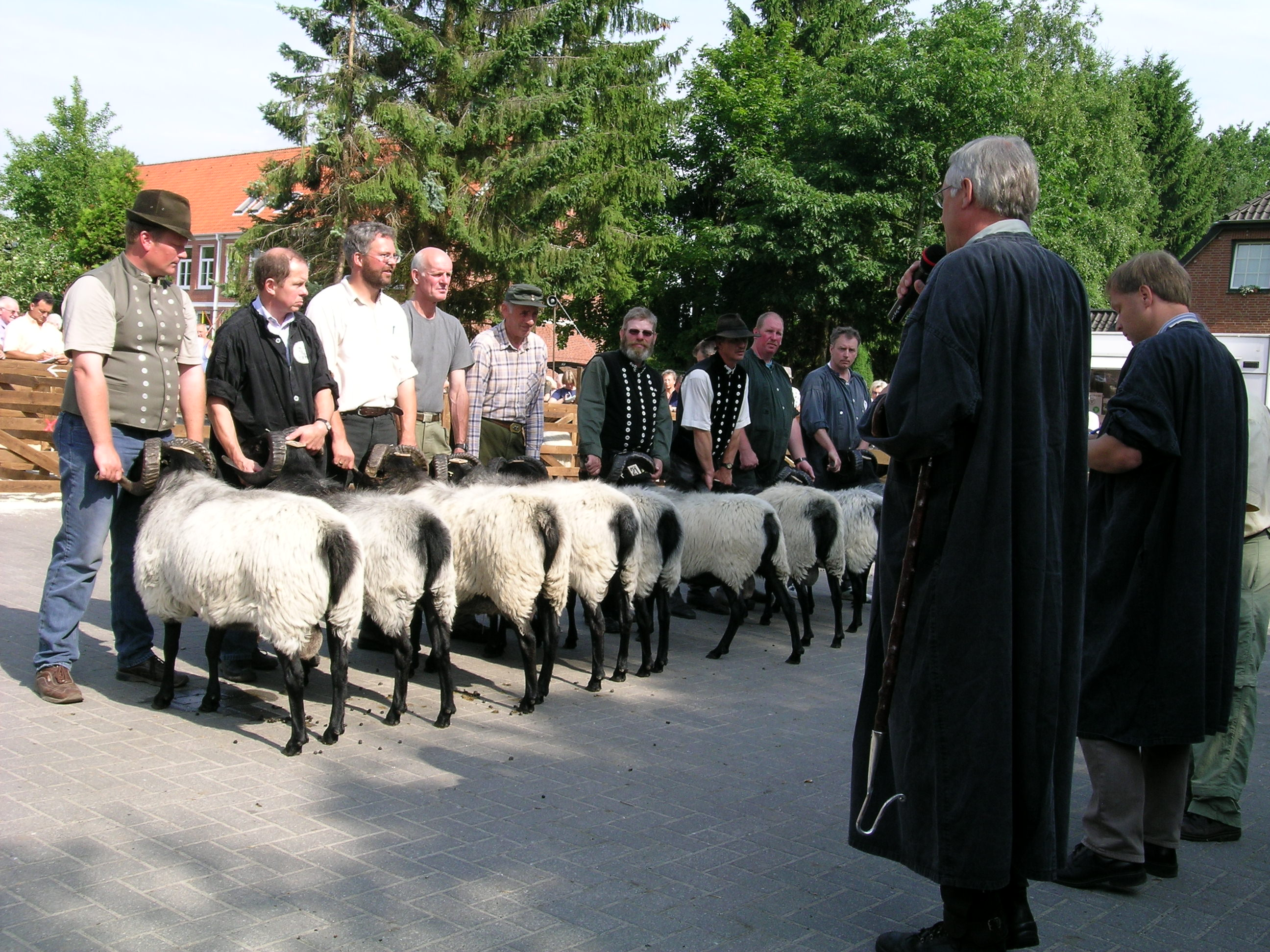
The young rams are awarded prizes

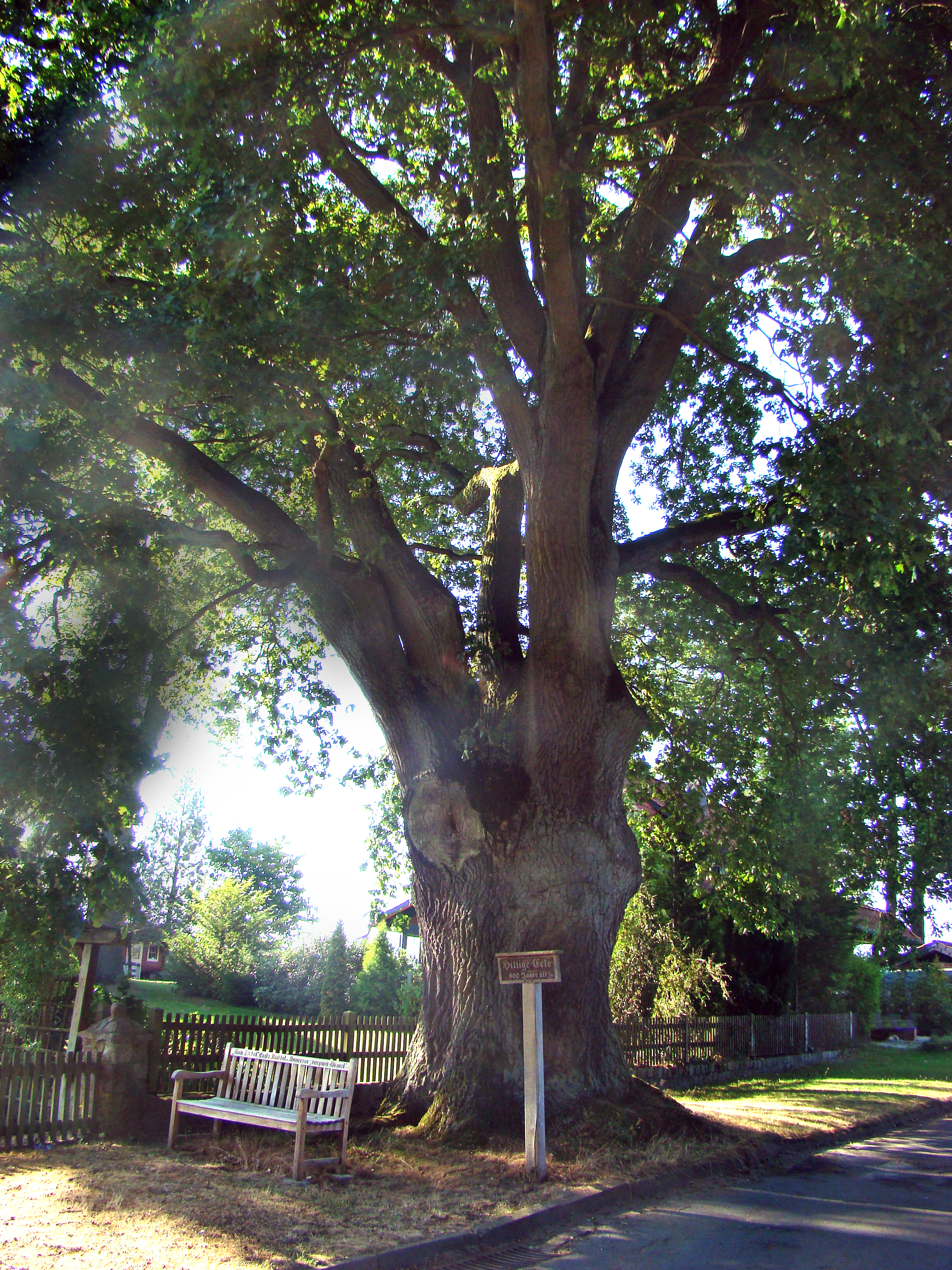
The Holy Oak (Hillige Eeke) near Müden/Örtze 52°52′54.98″N 10°06′47.31″E

== Sport ==
The local sports club, MTV Müden/Örtze, founded in 1913, runs a variety of sports including the triathlon, handball, endurance sports, cycling, gymnastics, leisure pursuits and swimming. The club has around 1,000 members.

== Daughters and sons ==
- Harald Küppers (b 1928), German researcher
- Felicitas Rose (b 31 July 1862 in Arnsberg; d 18 June 1938 in Müden (Örtze), real name Rosa Caroline Mathilde Emma Schliewen), German author
