= Kiehnmoor =

Coordinates: 52°55′53″N 10°14′45″E

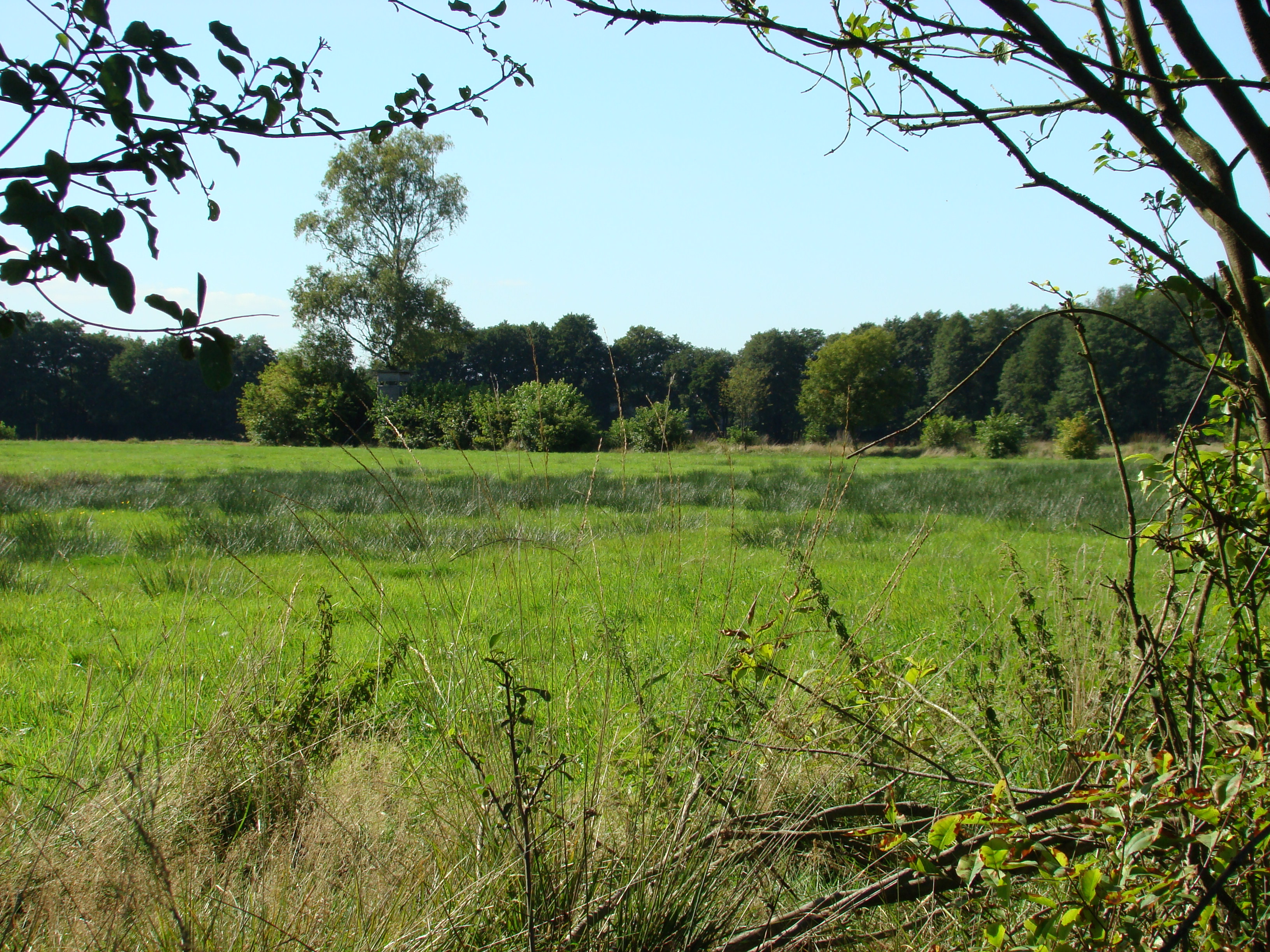
Wet meadow in the Kiehnmoor

The Kiehnmoor is a nature reserve in Germany. It was designated as a nature reserve in 1992. It has an area of 440 hectares (1,100 acres) of which 100 hectares (250 acres) lie in Celle district and 340 hectares (840 acres) in Uelzen district. The nature conservation authorities of these districts are responsible for the reserve. A large part of the area is wet meadow, that in places is intensively farmed. However the majority of the area has been left in its natural state. A small sand heath forms part of the reserve. Its southern perimeter borders immediately on the larger heathland area of the Südheide Nature Park. The Heidschnucken, moorland sheep characteristic of the region, are reared here. North of the Kiehnmoor and immediately adjacent to it is the valley of a partially dammed stream, the Gerdau, and the Brambosteler Moor nature reserve. To the southeast the reserve borders on the Unterlüß Firing Range (Schießplatz Unterlüß), belonging to the firm of Rheinmetall, and the Große Heide ("Large Heath") near Unterlüß, that is closed to the public. Kiehnmoor, too, is totally out-of-bounds. This whole area is very secluded. Rare birds have settled here including the crane and the black stork. Even the otter may be found here.

Due to its seclusion, the good supply of nutrients and the space, the relatively natural stands of wood (partly alder and birch fen woods) create an important habitat for black grouse, a species which is very susceptible to disturbance and is threatened by extinction. Together with neighbouring and the largely contiguous areas of the Munster and Bergen-Hohne Training Areas, the Großes Moor bei Becklingen, the marshes near Sittensen, the Ostenholz Moor and the Meißendorf Lakes, this part of the Lüneburg Heath is home to the largest single colony of black grouse on the North German Plain.

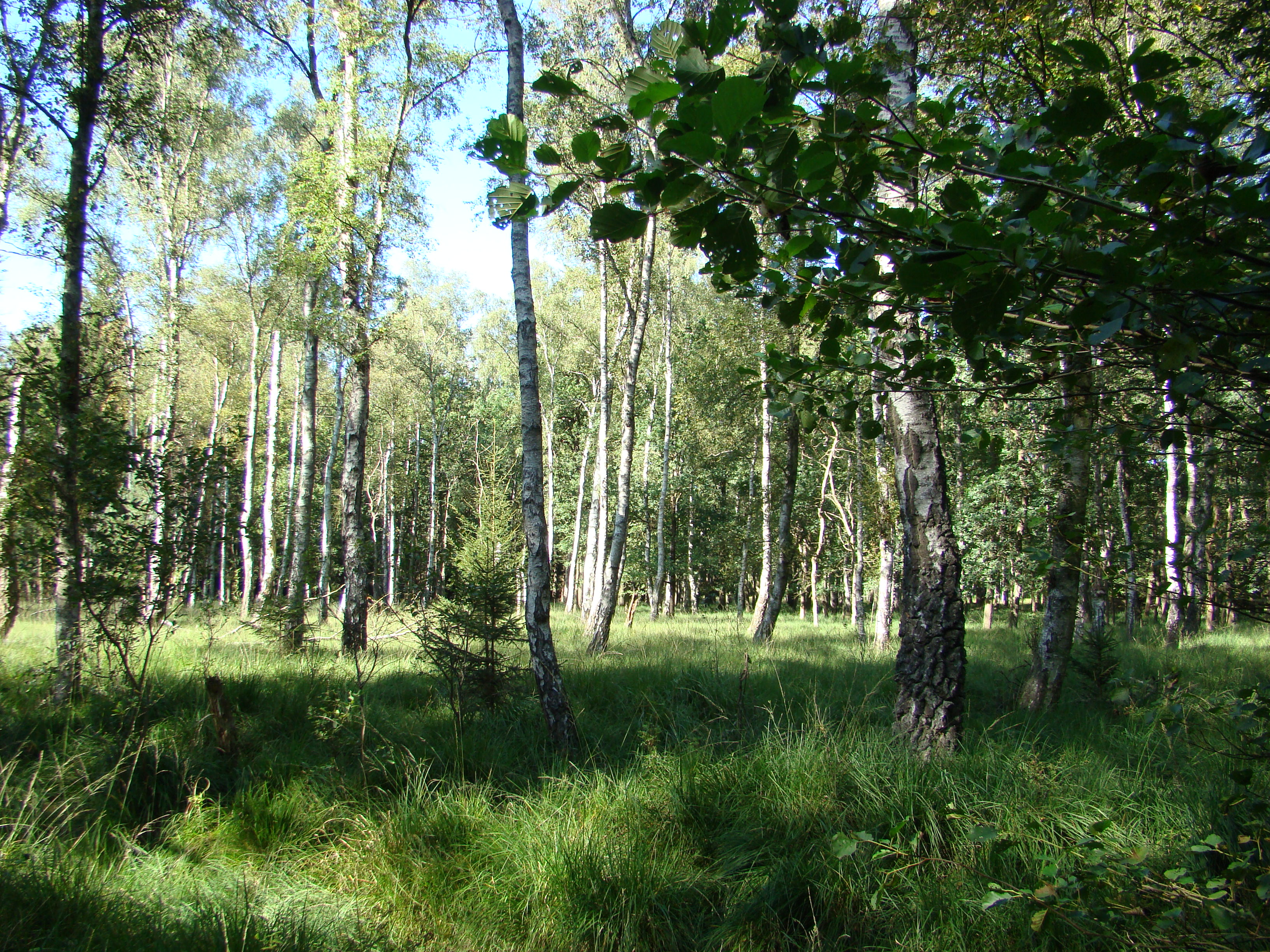
Birch fen wood, Kiehnmoor and Brambosteler Moor

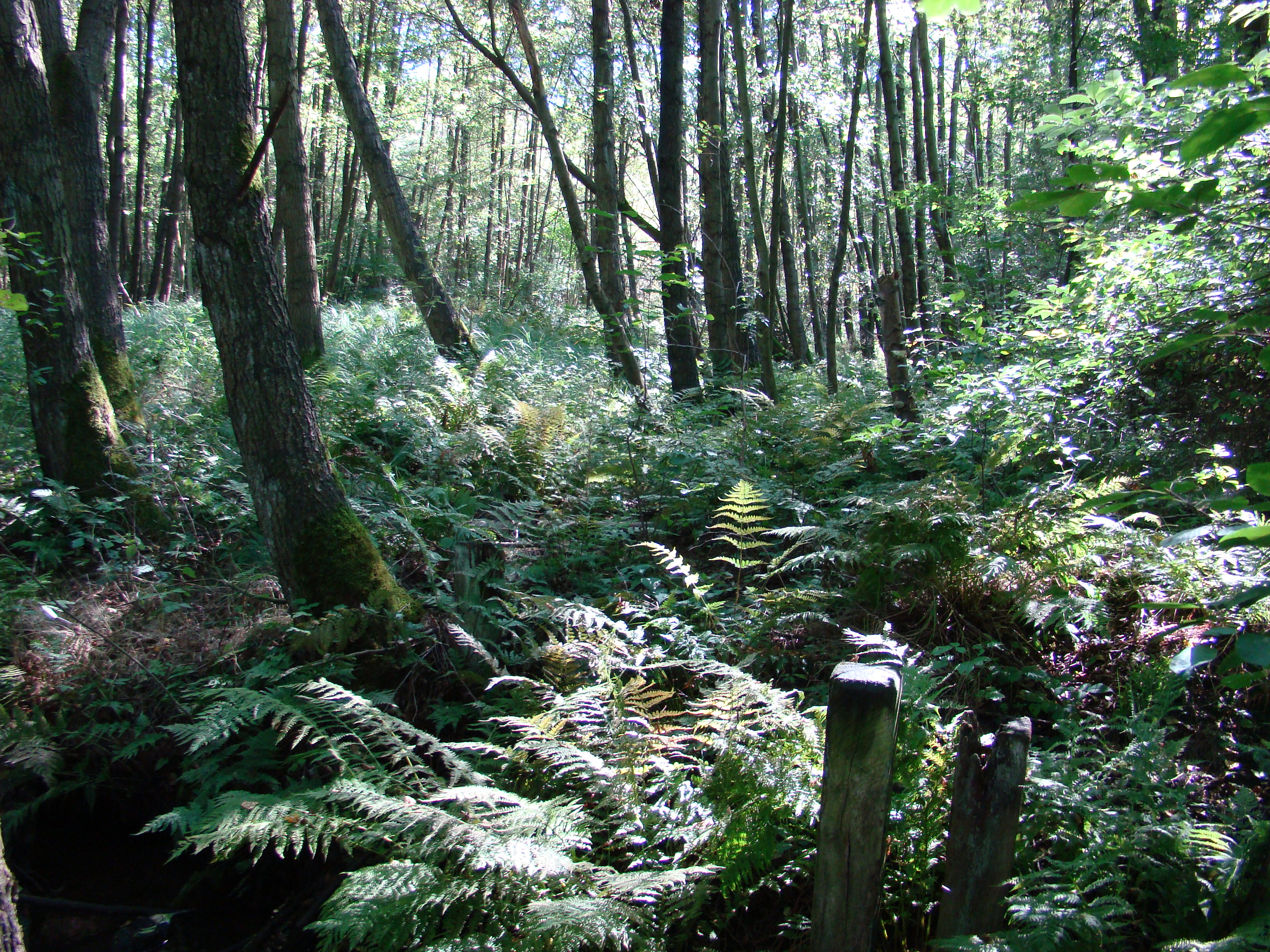
Alder fen wood, Kiehnmoor and Brambosteler Moor
