= Wietzendorf =

- Municipality
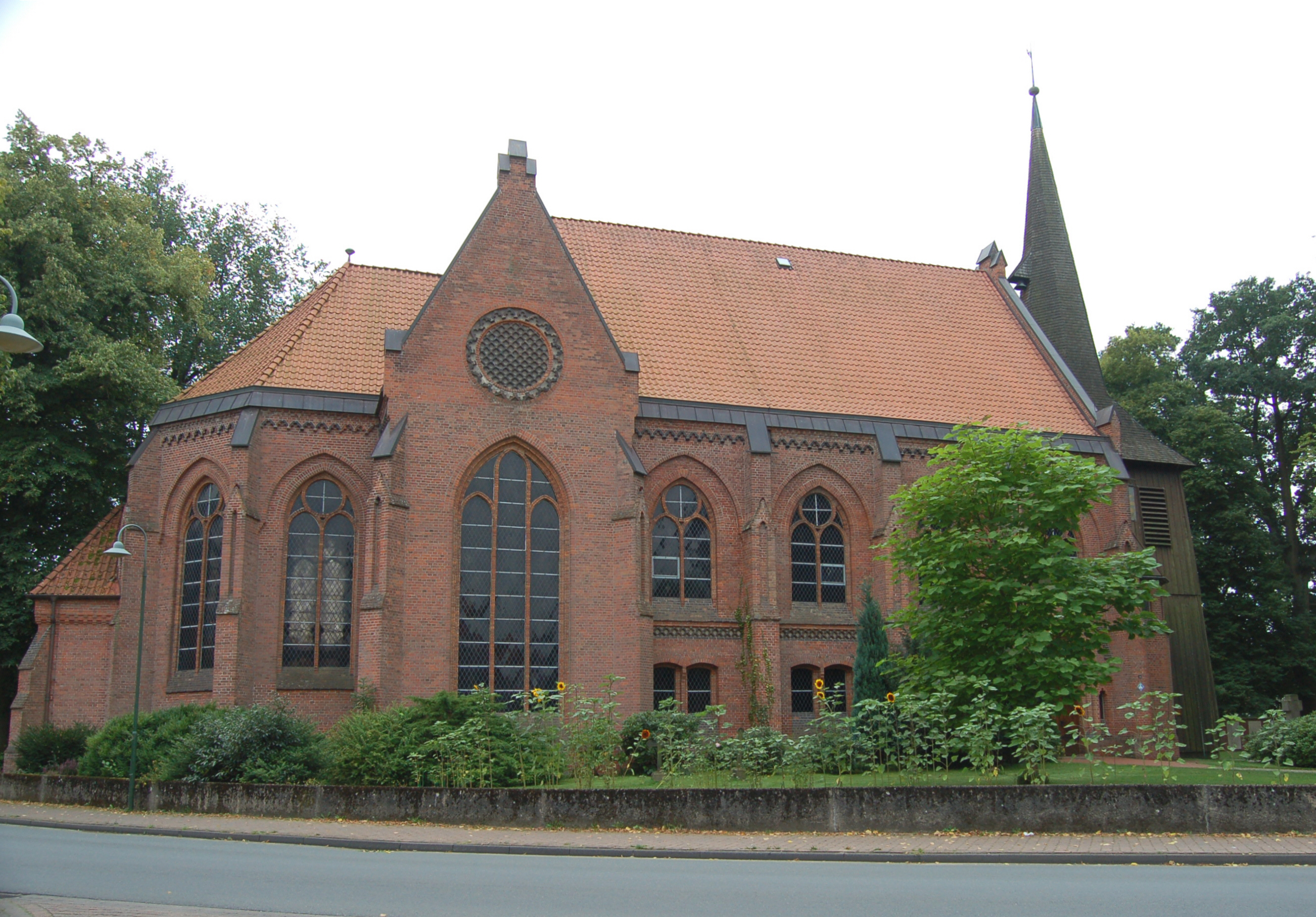
- Saint James' church

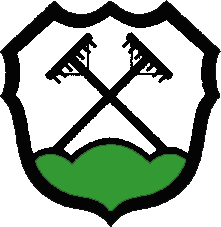
- Flag Coat of arms

- Location of Wietzendorf within Heidekreis district
- Interactive map of Wietzendorf
- Location within Germany Location within Lower Saxony
- Coordinates: 52°55′07″N 9°58′37″E
- Country: Germany
- State: Lower Saxony
- District: Heidekreis

Government
  - Mayor (2019–24): Jörg Peters

Area
  - Total: 107.58 km^{2} (41.54 sq mi)
- Elevation: 66 m (217 ft)

Population (2025-12-31)
  - Total: 4,168
  - Density: 38.74/km^{2} (100.3/sq mi)
- Time zone: UTC+01:00 (CET)
  - Summer (DST): UTC+02:00 (CEST)
- Postal codes: 29649
- Dialling codes: 05196
- Vehicle registration: HK
- Website: www.wietzendorf.de

Wietzendorf (German pronunciation: [ˈviːtsn̩dɔʁf]; Eastphalian: Witzendörp) is a municipality in the district of Heidekreis, in Lower Saxony, in northern Germany. It is situated approximately 14 km southeast of Soltau, and 50 km southwest of Lüneburg. The population as of 31 December 2012 is 4,071 people.

== World War II ==
During World War II, a camp for prisoners of war (Kriegsgefangenenlager), including a section for officers (Oflag 83), was located near Wietzendorf. The camp was initially used for Soviet prisoners from the Eastern Front; later it was partially evacuated because of the poor sanitary conditions and used to house other prisoners, including many Italian Military Internees which Nazi Germany considered to have lost their military status, as they had declined to follow Mussolini's orders after the armistice between Italy and the Allies. Among the Italian prisoners was Giovannino Guareschi, who would later become world-renowned as the author of Don Camillo and Alessandro Natta, later General Secretary of the PCI. The present day district of Lührsbockel was the location of a forced labour subcamp of the prison in Celle.

In 1968 also Polish POWs from World War II were buried there.

== Gallery ==
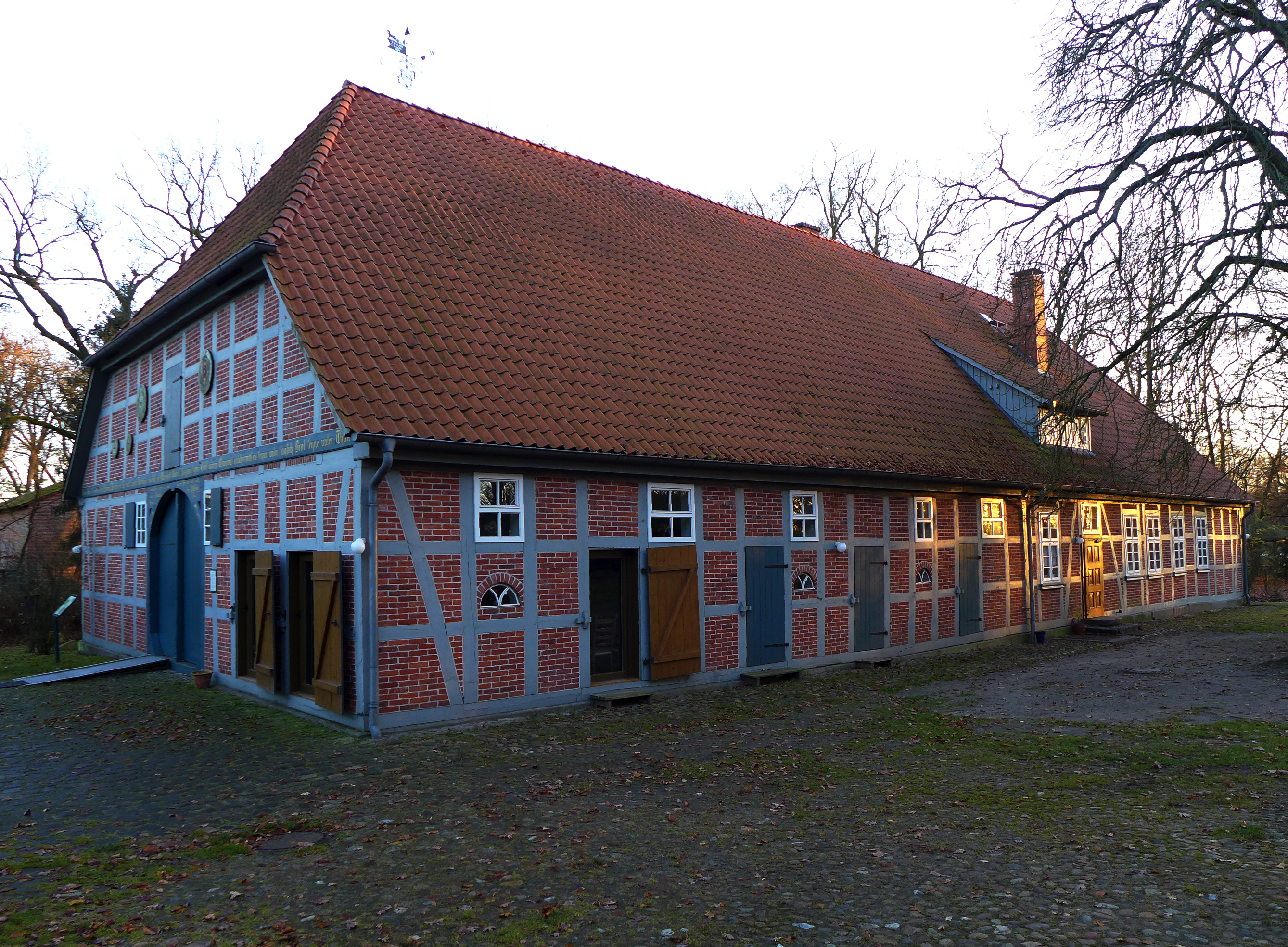
Local museum

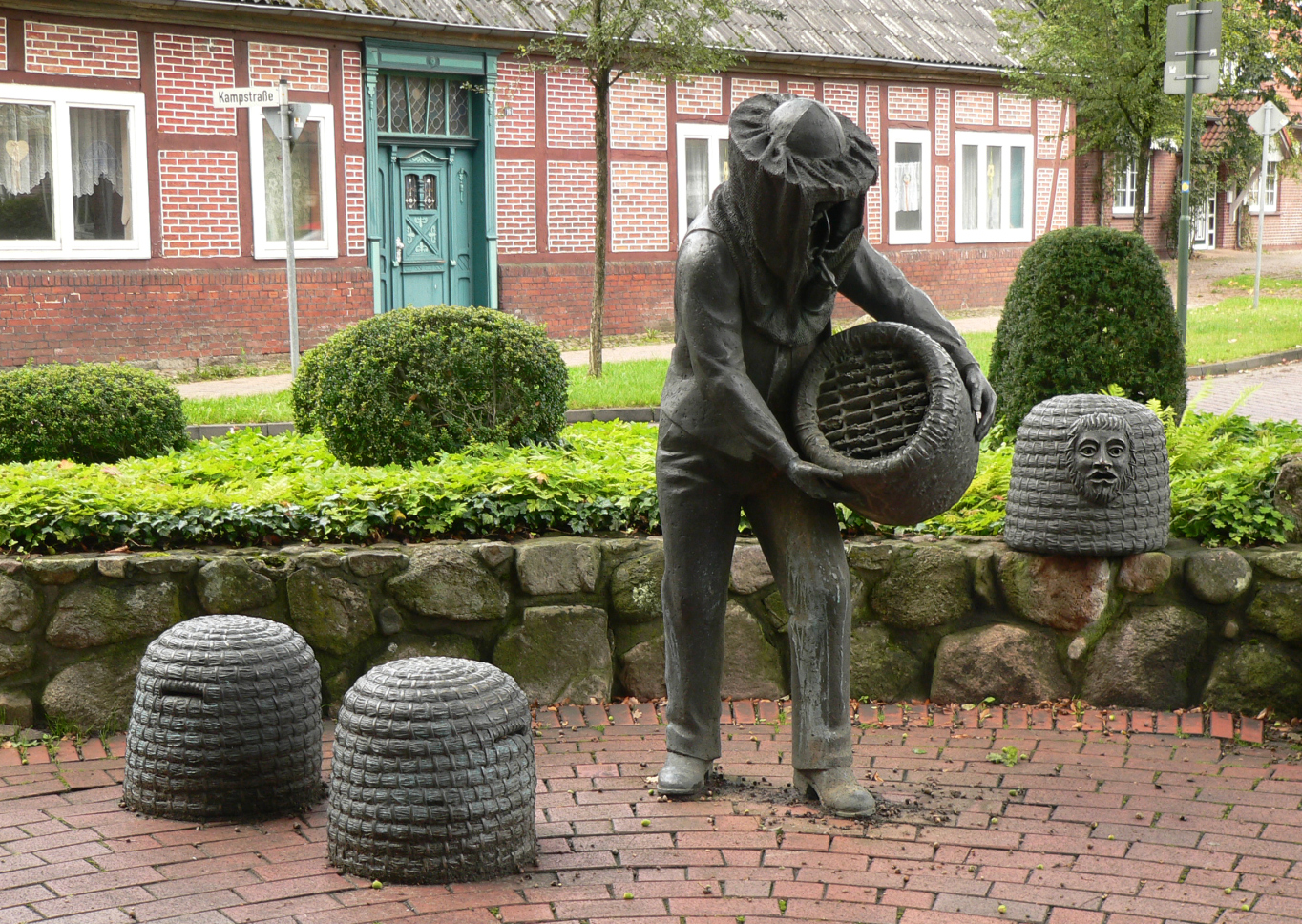

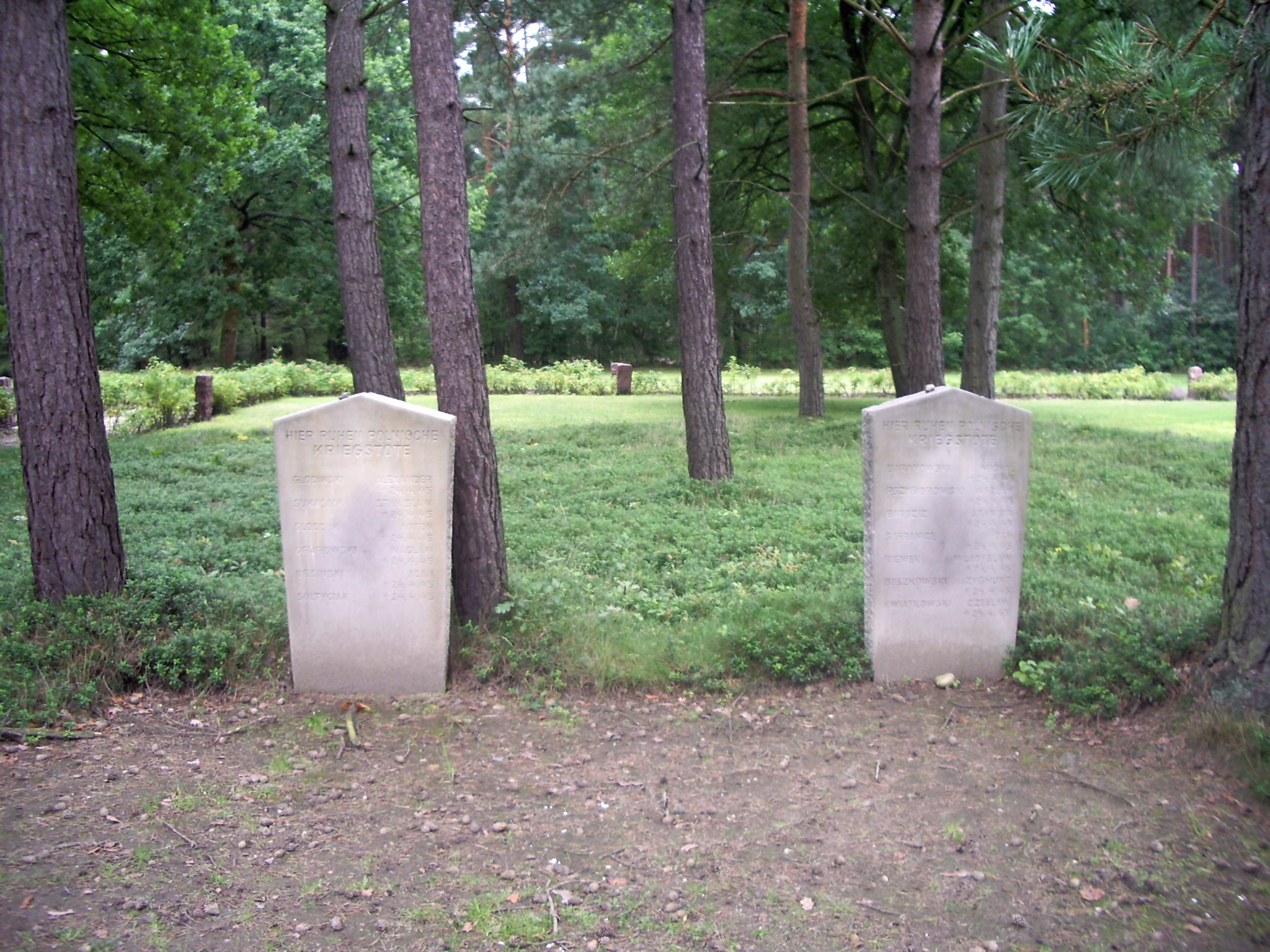
Graves of Polish POWs

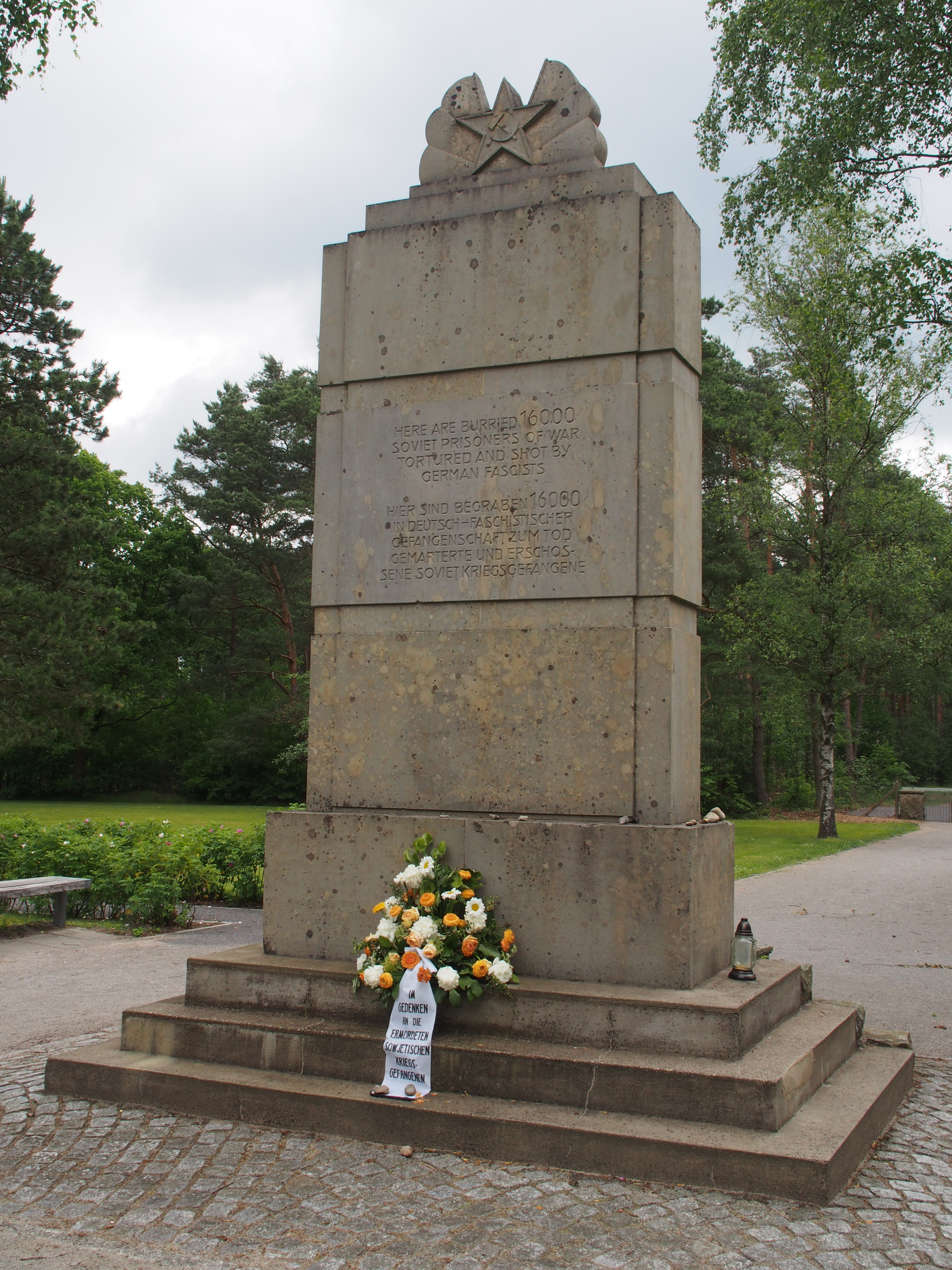
Memorial to Soviet POWs
